= Belgium in the Eurovision Song Contest =

- Eurovision Song Contest
- Participating broadcaster: Radio-télévision belge de la Communauté française (RTBF; 1978–present) Formerly: Institut national de radiodiffusion (INR; 1956–1960) (Note: Nationaal Instituut voor de Radio-omroep (NIR) and Institut national de radiodiffusion (INR) were the two official names of the single National Broadcasting Institute (NIR/INR).); Radiodiffusion-télévision belge (RTB; 1961–1977); Vlaamse Radio- en Televisieomroeporganisatie (VRT; 1998–present) Formerly: Nationaal Instituut voor de Radio-omroep (NIR; 1956–1960); Belgische Radio- en Televisieomroep (BRT; 1961–1990); Belgische Radio- en Televisieomroep Nederlandstalige Uitzendingen (BRTN; 1991–1997)

Participation summary
- Appearances: 67 (55 finals)
- First appearance: 1956
- Highest placement: 1st: 1986
- Host: 1987
- Participation history: 1956; 1957; 1958; 1959; 1960; 1961; 1962; 1963; 1964; 1965; 1966; 1967; 1968; 1969; 1970; 1971; 1972; 1973; 1974; 1975; 1976; 1977; 1978; 1979; 1980; 1981; 1982; 1983; 1984; 1985; 1986; 1987; 1988; 1989; 1990; 1991; 1992; 1993; 1994; 1995; 1996; 1997; 1998; 1999; 2000; 2001; 2002; 2003; 2004; 2005; 2006; 2007; 2008; 2009; 2010; 2011; 2012; 2013; 2014; 2015; 2016; 2017; 2018; 2019; ~~2020~~; 2021; 2022; 2023; 2024; 2025; 2026

External links
- RTBF page; VRT page
- Belgium's page at Eurovision.com
- For the most recent participation see Belgium in the Eurovision Song Contest 2026

Belgium has been represented at the Eurovision Song Contest 67 times since making its debut as one of seven countries at the first contest in 1956. The only countries with more appearances are Germany (69), France (68) and the United Kingdom (68). Belgium has been absent only three times in total, in 1994, 1997, and 2001, due to low scores in the previous contests that relegated them from the contest. Belgium has won the contest once, in 1986.

In the first 20 years of the contest, Belgium's best result was a fourth place with "Un peu de poivre, un peu de sel" performed by Tonia in 1966. In 1978, "L'amour ça fait chanter la vie" by Jean Vallée achieved Belgium's first top three placement, when it was second. "J'aime la vie" became the first and to date only win for Belgium in 1986, performed by a 13-year-old Sandra Kim. Belgium's only other top three result came in 2003, when "Sanomi" by Urban Trad finished second, losing out by only two points. Belgium has finished last in the contest eight times, most recently in 2000, and has twice received nul points, in 1962 and 1965.

After the introduction of the semi-finals in 2004, Belgium failed to reach the final for five consecutive years (2005–2009). Since 2010, Belgium has qualified for the final in eight out of fifteen contests and placing in the top ten five times, with "Me and My Guitar" by Tom Dice (sixth in 2010), "Rhythm Inside" by Loïc Nottet (fourth in 2015), "What's the Pressure" by Laura Tesoro (tenth in 2016), "City Lights" by Blanche (fourth in 2017), and "Because of You" by Gustaph (seventh in 2023).

== Participation ==
Belgium is a federal country divided into two major linguistic regions: Dutch-speaking Flanders in the north and French-speaking Wallonia in the south, each region having its own broadcaster: Vlaamse Radio- en Televisieomroeporganisatie (VRT) (Note: Since 1998. Previously: Nationaal Instituut voor de Radio-omroep (NIR; 1956–1960), Belgische Radio- en Televisieomroep (BRT; 1961–1990), and Belgische Radio- en Televisieomroep Nederlandstalige Uitzendingen (BRTN; 1991–1997).) in Flanders and Radio-télévision belge de la Communauté française (RTBF) (Note: Since 1978. Previously: Institut national de radiodiffusion (INR; 1956–1960), and Radiodiffusion-télévision belge (RTB; 1961–1977).) in Wallonia. Both broadcasters are full members of the European Broadcasting Union (EBU), thus eligible to participate in the Eurovision Song Contest. As only one entrant per country is allowed in the contest in any given year, they take turns in representing Belgium. As of 2021, VRT is in charge on odd years while RTBF is in charge on even years, with both broadcasters sharing the broadcasting rights.

== Contest history ==
Belgium has participated in Eurovision since the very first contest in 1956, however Tonia's fourth place at the 1966 contest remained the country's most notable achievement until Jean Vallée placed second in 1978. In the 80s, following good results for Stella (fourth in 1982) and Jacques Zegers (fifth in 1984), Belgium finished last for the sixth time in 1985. This was followed by Belgium's first and (as of 2025) only Eurovision victory in 1986, when Sandra Kim won with her song "J'aime la vie". Although the lyrics claimed she was 15 years old, she was actually only 13 which prompted runner-up Switzerland to petition for her disqualification, to no avail. (Note: Since the 1990 contest, the minimum age for participation is 16, meaning that Kim shall remain the youngest winner unless the age limit is waivered.) By winning in 1986, Belgium became the last of the seven Eurovision founding countries to win the contest, as Switzerland, the Netherlands, France, Luxembourg, Italy and Germany all had won at least once before. Belgium scored an absolute record at the time, with Kim earning a never-seen-before number of 176 points (that record remained until 1993, with Ireland scoring 187 points). With an average of 9.26 points per voting nation and 77.2% of the maximum possible score, as of 2022, Kim's record still ranks eighth among all Eurovision winners.

Belgium finished last for the seventh time at the 1993 contest, before achieving its only top ten result of the 90s decade at the 1998 contest, where Mélanie Cohl finished sixth. In the 2000s, Belgium experienced mixed fortunes: the country started the decade by finishing last for the eighth and (as of 2022) final time at the 2000 contest in Stockholm, before achieving its best result of the 21st century in 2003 when Urban Trad sang in an imaginary language and earned second place with 165 points, losing out to Turkey's Sertab Erener by just two points. The country then failed to qualify from the semi-finals for 5 consecutive contests from 2005 to 2009.

The 2010 entry for Belgium was Tom Dice, runner-up of the Belgian Flemish version of The X Factor in 2008. Dice finished first in his semi-final, allowing Belgium to participate in the final for the first time since 2004 and eventually finishing sixth overall, Belgium's best result since 2003 and the best result ever for a Flemish entrant (tied with 1959). Belgium then experienced a mix of ups and downs for the remainder of the 2010s: while the country failed to qualify for the final on five occasions (in 2011, 2012, 2014, 2018 and 2019), Belgium qualified in 2013 (with Roberto Bellarosa placing 12th) before scoring a three-year streak in the top ten, thanks to Loïc Nottet (fourth in 2015), Laura Tesoro (tenth in 2016) and Blanche (fourth in 2017). Following two non-qualifications in 2018 and 2019, Belgium recorded three consecutive qualifications with Hooverphonic (2021), Jérémie Makiese (2022) and Gustaph (2023), the latter finishing in seventh place overall. Two more non-qualifications followed in 2024 and 2025, before Essyla again brought Belgium back to the final in 2026.

=== Disparity between broadcasters ===
There has been a significant difference in the results achieved by the Belgian participating broadcasters. The Walloon broadcasters recorded Belgium's only win in 1986, all of Belgium's ten top-five placements, and 18 out of Belgium's 26 top ten placements. On the other hand, the Flemish broadcasters have placed in the top ten eight times, while scoring six out of Belgium's eight last-place finishes. In the 1990s, the relegation rule was introduced, where the lowest-placing countries would not be allowed to compete the following year, to accommodate for the growing number of participating countries. Belgium was relegated three times, in 1994, 1997, and 2001; twice following a poor placing by a Flemish BRTN act the previous year, and once after Walloon RTBF act, "Envie de vivre" by Nathalie Sorce, placed last in 2000.

Since the introduction of semi-finals in 2004, the broadcasters have scored similarly in terms of qualification: as of 2025, RTBF and VRT each qualified four times out of ten semi-finals.

=== Songs by language ===
1. English (35.6%)
2. French (34.8%)
3. Dutch (26.7%)

Songs	Language	Years
25	English	1975, 1977, 1999, 2002, 2004, 2006, 2007, 2009, 2010, 2011, 2012, 2013, 2014, 2015, 2016, 2017, 2018, 2019, ~~2020~~, 2021, 2022, 2023, 2024, 2025, 2026
24	French	1956, (Note: Each country sent two songs to the 1956 contest; both of Belgium's were in French.) 1958, 1960, 1962, 1964, 1966, 1968, 1970, 1972, 1974, 1976, 1978, 1980, 1982, 1984, 1986, 1988, 1990, 1992, 1995, 1998, 2000, 2005
19	Dutch	1957, 1959, 1961, 1963, 1965, 1967, 1969, 1971, 1973, 1975, 1979, 1981, 1983, 1985, 1987, 1989, 1991, 1993, 1996
2	Imaginary	2003, 2008

== Participation overview ==
Table key
1	First place
2	Second place
3	Third place
◁	Last place
◇	Entry selected but did not compete

Year	Artist	Song	Language	Final	Points	Semi	Points
1956	Fud Leclerc	"Messieurs les noyés de la Seine"	French	—N/a (Note: The 1956 contest had secret voting and, apart from the winner, no results were released.)	—N/a	No semi-finals	
1956	Mony Marc	"Le Plus Beau Jour de ma vie"	French	—N/a	—N/a	No semi-finals	
1957	Bobbejaan Schoepen	"Straatdeuntje"	Dutch	8	5	No semi-finals	
1958	Fud Leclerc	"Ma petite chatte"	French	5	8	No semi-finals	
1959	Bob Benny	"Hou toch van mij"	Dutch	6	9	No semi-finals	
1960	Fud Leclerc	"Mon amour pour toi"	French	6	9	No semi-finals	
1961	Bob Benny	"September, gouden roos"	Dutch	15 ◁	1	No semi-finals	
1962	Fud Leclerc	"Ton nom"	French	13 ◁	0	No semi-finals	
1963	Jacques Raymond	"Waarom?"	Dutch	10	4	No semi-finals	
1964	Robert Cogoi	"Près de ma rivière"	French	10	2	No semi-finals	
1965	Lize Marke	"Als het weer lente is"	Dutch	15 ◁	0	No semi-finals	
1966	Tonia	"Un peu de poivre, un peu de sel"	French	4	14	No semi-finals	
1967	Louis Neefs	"Ik heb zorgen"	Dutch	7	8	No semi-finals	
1968	Claude Lombard	"Quand tu reviendras"	French	7	8	No semi-finals	
1969	Louis Neefs	"Jennifer Jennings"	Dutch	7	10	No semi-finals	
1970	Jean Vallée	"Viens l'oublier"	French	8	5	No semi-finals	
1971	Jacques Raymond and Lily Castel	"Goeie morgen, morgen"	Dutch	14	68	No semi-finals	
1972	Serge and Christine Ghisoland	"À la folie ou pas du tout"	French	17	55	No semi-finals	
1973	Nicole and Hugo	"Baby Baby"	Dutch	17 ◁	58	No semi-finals	
1974	Jacques Hustin	"Fleur de liberté"	French	9	10	No semi-finals	
1975	Ann Christy	"Gelukkig zijn"	Dutch, English	15	17	No semi-finals	
1976	Pierre Rapsat	"Judy et Cie"	French	8	68	No semi-finals	
1977	Dream Express	"A Million in One, Two, Three"	English	7	69	No semi-finals	
1978	Jean Vallée	"L'amour ça fait chanter la vie"	French	2	125	No semi-finals	
1979	Micha Marah	"Hey Nana"	Dutch	18 ◁	5	No semi-finals	
1980	Telex	"Euro-Vision"	French	17	14	No semi-finals	
1981	Emly Starr	"Samson"	Dutch	13	40	No semi-finals	
1982	Stella	"Si tu aimes ma musique"	French	4	96	No semi-finals	
1983	Pas de Deux	"Rendez-vous"	Dutch	18	13	No semi-finals	
1984	Jacques Zegers	"Avanti la vie"	French	5	70	No semi-finals	
1985	Linda Lepomme	"Laat me nu gaan"	Dutch	19 ◁	7	No semi-finals	
1986	Sandra Kim	"J'aime la vie"	French	1	176	No semi-finals	
1987	Liliane Saint-Pierre	"Soldiers of Love"	Dutch	11	56	No semi-finals	
1988	Reynaert	"Laissez briller le soleil"	French	18	5	No semi-finals	
1989	Ingeborg	"Door de wind"	Dutch	19	13	No semi-finals	
1990	Philippe Lafontaine	"Macédomienne"	French	12	46	No semi-finals	
1991	Clouseau	"Geef het op"	Dutch	16	23	No semi-finals	
1992	Morgane	"Nous on veut des violons"	French	20	11	No semi-finals	
1993	Barbara	"Iemand als jij"	Dutch	25 ◁	3	Kvalifikacija za Millstreet	
1995	Frédéric Etherlinck	"La voix est libre"	French	20	8	No semi-finals	
1996	Lisa del Bo	"Liefde is een kaartspel"	Dutch	16	22	12	45
1998	Mélanie Cohl	"Dis oui"	French	6	122	No semi-finals	
1999	Vanessa Chinitor	"Like the Wind"	English	12	38	No semi-finals	
2000	Nathalie Sorce	"Envie de vivre"	French	24 ◁	2	No semi-finals	
2002	Sergio and the Ladies	"Sister"	English	13	33	No semi-finals	
2003	Urban Trad	"Sanomi"	Imaginary	2	165	No semi-finals	
2004	Xandee	"1 Life"	English	22	7	Top 11 in 2003 contest (Note: According to the then-Eurovision rules, the top ten non-Big Four countries from the previous year along with the Big Four automatically qualified for the Grand Final without having to compete in semi-finals. For example, if Germany and France placed inside the top ten, the 11th and 12th spots were advanced to next year's Grand Final along with all countries ranked in the top ten.)	
2005	Nuno Resende	"Le Grand Soir"	French	Failed to qualify		22	29
2006	Kate Ryan	"Je t'adore"	English	Failed to qualify		12	69
2007	The KMG's	"Love Power"	English	Failed to qualify		26	14
2008	Ishtar	"O Julissi"	Imaginary	Failed to qualify		17	16
2009	Copycat	"Copycat"	English	Failed to qualify		17	1
2010	Tom Dice	"Me and My Guitar"	English	6	143	1	167
2011	Witloof Bay	"With Love Baby"	English	Failed to qualify		11	53
2012	Iris	"Would You?"	English	Failed to qualify		17	16
2013	Roberto Bellarosa	"Love Kills"	English	12	71	5	75
2014	Axel Hirsoux	"Mother"	English	Failed to qualify		14	28
2015	Loïc Nottet	"Rhythm Inside"	English	4	217	2	149
2016	Laura Tesoro	"What's the Pressure"	English	10	181	3	274
2017	Blanche	"City Lights"	English	4	363	4	165
2018	Sennek	"A Matter of Time"	English	Failed to qualify		12	91
2019	Eliot	"Wake Up"	English	Failed to qualify		13	70
2020	Hooverphonic ◇	"Release Me" ◇	English ◇	Contest cancelled (Note: The 2020 contest was cancelled due to the COVID-19 pandemic.)			
2021	Hooverphonic	"The Wrong Place"	English	19	74	9	117
2022	Jérémie Makiese	"Miss You"	English	19	64	8	151
2023	Gustaph	"Because of You"	English	7	182	8	90
2024	Mustii	"Before the Party's Over"	English	Failed to qualify		13	18
2025	Red Sebastian	"Strobe Lights"	English	Failed to qualify		14	23
2026	Essyla	"Dancing on the Ice"	English	21	36	10	91
2027	Confirmed intention to participate †						

== Hostings ==
Year	Location	Venue	Presenter
1987	Brussels	Centenary Palace	Viktor Lazlo

== Awards ==
=== Barbara Dex Award ===
Year	Performer	Host city	Ref.
2000	Nathalie Sorce	(Sweden) Stockholm	

== Related involvement ==
=== Conductors ===
Year	Conductor (Note: All conductors are of Belgian nationality unless otherwise noted.)	Notes	Ref.
1956	Léo Souris		
1957	(Germany) Willy Berking	Host conductor	
1958	(Netherlands) Dolf van der Linden	Host conductor	
1959	Francis Bay		
1960	Henri Segers		
1961	Francis Bay		
1962	Henri Segers		
1963	Francis Bay		
1964	Henri Segers		
1965	Gaston Nuyts		
1966	(Luxembourg) Jean Roderes	Host conductor	
1967	Francis Bay		
1968	Henri Segers		
1969	Francis Bay		
1970	Jack Say		
1971	Francis Bay		
1972	Henri Segers		
1973	Francis Bay		
1974	(France) Pierre Chiffre		
1975	Francis Bay		
1976	(France) Michel Bernholc		
1977	(United Kingdom) Alyn Ainsworth		
1978	(France) Jean Musy		
1979	Francis Bay		
1980	No conductor		
1981	Giuseppe Marchese		
1982	Jack Say		
1983	Freddy Sunder		
1984	Jo Carlier		
1985	(Sweden) Curt-Eric Holmquist	Host conductor	
1986	Jo Carlier		
1987	Freddy Sunder	(Note: The contest was organized by RTBF, but the Belgian entry was from BRT, hence Walloon Jo Carlier serving as musical director (and conducting for Cyprus) while a Flemish conductor led the Belgian entry.)	
1988	Daniel Willem		
1989	Freddy Sunder		
1990	Rony Brack		
1991	Roland Verlooven		
1992	Frank Fievez		
1993	Bert Candries		
1995	Alec Mansion		
1996	Bob Porter		
1998	No conductor		

=== Commentators and spokespersons ===
Over the years, commentary for the contest on VRT and RTBF has been provided by several experienced radio and television presenters, including Jacques Mercier, Luc Appermont and Paule Herreman. From 1991, André Vermeulen provided the Dutch-language commentary every year except 1996. Jean-Pierre Hautier provided French-language commentary from 1994 to 2012, later dying shortly after the 2012 contest. In 1962, BRT retransmitted the commentary feed from the Dutch broadcaster NTS, possibly for financial reasons.

VRT supplied an additional commentator to join André Vermeulen starting in 1998; between 1999 and 2010, dual commentary was provided by either Bart Peeters or Anja Daems. Peeters provided the commentary during the years when VRT selected the entries, whilst Daems commentated the years in which RTBF selected the entries. Sven Pichal replaced Daems in 2011, whilst Peter Van de Veire replaced Peeters. In 2007, Jean-Louis Lahaye joined Jean-Pierre Hautier as a supplementary commentator for RTBF. After Hautier's death in 2012, Lahaye was joined by Maureen Louys in 2013.

Television and radio broadcasts, commentators and spokespersons
Year	Flemish Community (VRT)				French Community (RTBF)				Spokesperson	Ref.
Year	Television		Radio		Television		Radio		Spokesperson	Ref.
Year	Channel	Commentator(s)	Channel	Commentator(s)	Channel	Commentator(s)	Channel	Commentator(s)	Spokesperson	Ref.
1956	NIR	Piet te Nuyl Jr. (Note: Commentary provided by the Netherlands NTS)	No radio broadcast		INR	Raymond Colbert (Note: Commentary provided by Switzerland's TSR)	No radio broadcast		No spokesperson	
1957	NIR	Unknown	Brussel Vlaams	Unknown	INR	Robert Beauvais (Note: Commentary provided by France's RTF)	No radio broadcast		Unknown	
1958	NIR	Unknown	No radio broadcast		INR	Unknown	Bruxelles I	Unknown	Unknown	
1959	NIR	Paula Sémer	No radio broadcast		INR	Paule Herreman	No radio broadcast		Unknown	
1960	NIR	Nic Bal	No radio broadcast		INR	Pierre Tchernia	No radio broadcast		Unknown	
1961	BRT	Nic Bal	No radio broadcast		RTB	Robert Beauvais	No radio broadcast		Unknown	
1962	BRT	Willem Duys	No radio broadcast		RTB	Unknown	No radio broadcast		Unknown	
1963	BRT	Bob Boon and Denise Maes	No radio broadcast		RTB	Pierre Delhasse	No radio broadcast		Unknown	
1964	BRT	Unknown	No radio broadcast		RTB	Unknown	No radio broadcast		Unknown	
1965	BRT	Unknown	No radio broadcast		RTB	Unknown	Premier Programme	Unknown	Unknown	
1966	BRT	Unknown	No radio broadcast		RTB	Unknown	Premier Programme	Unknown	Unknown	
1967	BRT	Herman Verelst	No radio broadcast		RTB	Paule Herreman	RTB 3	Unknown	Unknown	
1968	BRT	Herman Verelst	No radio broadcast		RTB	Paule Herreman	RTB 1	Unknown	Unknown	
1969	BRT	Jan Theys	No radio broadcast		RTB	Paule Herreman	RTB 1	Unknown	Eugène Senelle	
1970	BRT	Jan Theys	BRT 2 Omroep Brabant	Rudi Sinia	RTB	Unknown	RTB 1	Unknown	Unknown	
1971	BRT	Anton Peters	BRT 2 Omroep Brabant	Fred Braeckman	RTB	Paule Herreman	RTB 1	Unknown	No spokesperson	
1972	BRT	Unknown	No radio broadcast		RTB	Paule Herreman	RTB 1	Unknown	No spokesperson	
1973	BRT	Unknown	BRT 1	Unknown	RTB	Paule Herreman	RTB 1	Unknown	No spokesperson	
1974	BRT	Herman Verelst	BRT 1	Herman Verelst	RTB	Paule Herreman	RTB 1	Unknown	Unknown	
1975	BRT	Jan Geysen and Robrecht Willaert	BRT 1	Jan Geysen and Robrecht Willaert	RTB	Paule Herreman	RTB 2	Unknown	Unknown	
1976	BRT	Luc Appermont	BRT 1	Luc Appermont	RTB	Paule Herreman	RTB 2	Unknown	André Hagon	
1977	TV1	Luc Appermont	BRT 1	Unknown	RTB1	Patrick Duhamel	RTB 2	Unknown	Unknown	
1978	TV1	Luc Appermont	BRT 1	Jan Schoukens	RTBF1	Paule Herreman	RTBF 2	Unknown	Unknown	
1979	TV1	Luc Appermont	BRT 2 Omroep Brabant	Unknown	RTBF1	Paule Herreman	RTBF 1, RTBF 2	Unknown	Unknown	
1980	TV1	Luc Appermont	No radio broadcast		RTBF1	Jacques Mercier	RTBF 1	Unknown	Unknown	
1981	TV1	Luc Appermont	No radio broadcast		RTBF1	Unknown	RTBF 1	Unknown	Unknown	
1982	TV1	Luc Appermont	BRT 2 Omroep Brabant	Unknown	RTBF1	Jacques Mercier	RTBF 1, Bruxelles 21	Unknown	Unknown	
1983	TV1	Luc Appermont	BRT 2 Omroep Brabant	Luk de Laat	Télé 2	Jacques Mercier	RTBF 1	Unknown	Unknown	
1984	TV1	Luc Appermont	BRT 2	Unknown	RTBF1, Télé 2	Jacques Mercier	Unknown		Unknown	
1985	TV1	Luc Appermont	BRT 2	Luc Appermont	RTBF1	Jacques Mercier	Unknown		Unknown	
1986	TV1	Luc Appermont	BRT 2	Unknown	RTBF1, Télé 2	Patrick Duhamel	Unknown		Unknown	
1987	TV1	Luc Appermont	BRT 2	Unknown	RTBF1	Claude Delacroix	Radio Deux	Unknown	An Ploegaerts	
1988	TV1	Luc Appermont	BRT 2	Erik Bayens	RTBF1	Pierre Collard-Bovy	Unknown		Unknown	
1989	TV1	Luc Appermont	BRT 2	Ann Lepère	RTBF1	Jacques Mercier	Unknown		Unknown	
1990	TV2	Luc Appermont	BRT 2	Unknown	RTBF1	Claude Delacroix	Unknown		Unknown	
1991	TV1, TV2	André Vermeulen	Radio 2	Unknown	RTBF1	Claude Delacroix	Unknown		Unknown	
1992	TV1, TV2	André Vermeulen	Radio 2	Marc Brillouet and Julien Put	RTBF1	Claude Delacroix	Unknown		Unknown	
1993	TV1	André Vermeulen	No radio broadcast		RTBF1, Télé 21	Claude Delacroix	Unknown		Unknown	
1994	TV2	André Vermeulen	Radio 2	Marc Brillouet and Julien Put	RTBF1	Jean-Pierre Hautier	Unknown		Did not participate	
1995	TV1	André Vermeulen	Unknown		RTBF1	Jean-Pierre Hautier	Unknown		Marie-Françoise Renson	
1996	TV1	Michel Follet and Johan Verstreken	Radio 2	Guy De Pré and Bart Pieters	RTBF1	Jean-Pierre Hautier and Sandra Kim	Unknown		An Ploegaerts	
1997	TV1	André Vermeulen	No radio broadcast		RTBF La 1	Jean-Pierre Hautier	Unknown		Did not participate	
1998	TV1	André Vermeulen and Andrea Croonenberghs	Radio 2	André Vermeulen and Andrea Croonenberghs	RTBF La 1	Jean-Pierre Hautier	Unknown		Marie-Hélène Vanderborght	
1999	TV1	André Vermeulen and Bart Peeters	No radio broadcast		RTBF La 1	Jean-Pierre Hautier	Unknown		Sabine De Vos	
2000	TV1	André Vermeulen and Anja Daems	No radio broadcast		La Une	Jean-Pierre Hautier	No radio broadcast		Thomas Van Hamme	
2001	TV1	André Vermeulen and Anja Daems	No radio broadcast		La Une	Jean-Pierre Hautier	No radio broadcast		Did not participate	
2002	TV1	André Vermeulen and Bart Peeters	Radio 2	Filip Pletinckx and Katrien Palmers	La Une	Jean-Pierre Hautier	No radio broadcast		Geena Lisa Peeters	
2002	TV1	André Vermeulen and Bart Peeters	Radio Donna	Jan Bosman	La Une	Jean-Pierre Hautier	No radio broadcast		Geena Lisa Peeters	
2003	TV1	André Vermeulen and Anja Daems	No radio broadcast		La Une, RTBF Sat	Jean-Pierre Hautier	No radio broadcast		Corinne Boulangier	
2004	TV1	Unknown	No radio broadcast		La Une (Final)	Jean-Pierre Hautier	La Première (Final)	Unknown	Martine Prenen	
2005	Eén	André Vermeulen and Anja Daems	No radio broadcast		La Une, RTBF Sat	Jean-Louis Lahaye (Semi-final); Jean-Pierre Hautier (Final)	No radio broadcast		Armelle Gysen	
2006	Eén	André Vermeulen and Bart Peeters	Radio 2	Unknown	La Une, RTBF Sat	Jean-Pierre Hautier	No radio broadcast		Yasmine	
2007	Eén	André Vermeulen and Anja Daems	No radio broadcast		La Une, RTBF Sat	Jean-Louis Lahaye and Jean-Pierre Hautier	La Première	Unknown	Maureen Louys	
2008	Eén (SF1/Final); Eén+ (SF2)	André Vermeulen and Bart Peeters	No radio broadcast		La Une (SF1/Final)	Jean-Louis Lahaye and Jean-Pierre Hautier	No radio broadcast		Sandrine Van Handenhoven	
2009	Eén	André Vermeulen and Anja Daems	No radio broadcast		La Une, RTBF Sat	Jean-Louis Lahaye and Jean-Pierre Hautier	No radio broadcast		Maureen Louys	
2010	Eén	André Vermeulen and Bart Peeters	No radio broadcast		La Une	Jean-Louis Lahaye and Jean-Pierre Hautier	No radio broadcast		Katja Retsin	
2011	Eén	André Vermeulen and Sven Pichal	Radio 2	André Vermeulen and Sven Pichal	La Une	Jean-Louis Lahaye and Jean-Pierre Hautier	No radio broadcast		Maureen Louys	
2012	één	André Vermeulen and Peter Van de Veire	Radio 2	André Vermeulen and Peter Van de Veire	La Une	Jean-Louis Lahaye and Jean-Pierre Hautier	No radio broadcast		Peter Van de Veire	
2013	één	André Vermeulen and Tom De Cock	Radio 2	André Vermeulen and Tom De Cock	La Une	Jean-Louis Lahaye and Maureen Louys	No radio broadcast		Barbara Louys	
2014	één	Peter Van de Veire and Eva Daeleman	Radio 2	Peter Van de Veire and Eva Daeleman	La Une	Jean-Louis Lahaye and Maureen Louys	VivaCité (Final)	Olivier Gilain	Angelique Vlieghe	
2015	één	Peter Van de Veire and Eva Daeleman	Radio 2	Peter Van de Veire and Eva Daeleman	La Une	Jean-Louis Lahaye and Maureen Louys	VivaCité (Final)	Olivier Gilain	Walid	
2016	één	Peter Van de Veire	No radio broadcast		La Une	Jean-Louis Lahaye and Maureen Louys	No radio broadcast		Umesh Vangaver	
2017	één	Peter Van de Veire	Radio 2	Peter Van de Veire	La Une	Jean-Louis Lahaye and Maureen Louys	VivaCité (SF1/Final)	Olivier Gilain	Fanny Gillard	
2018	één	Peter Van de Veire	No radio broadcast		La Une	Jean-Louis Lahaye and Maureen Louys	No radio broadcast		Danira Boukhriss	
2019	één (SF1/Final); Ketnet (SF2)	Peter Van de Veire	No radio broadcast		La Une	Jean-Louis Lahaye and Maureen Louys	No radio broadcast		David Jeanmotte	
~~2020~~	Not announced before cancellation									N/A
2021	één	Peter Van de Veire	Radio 2 (Final)	Anja Daems and Showbizz Bart	La Une, RTBF Auvio	Jean-Louis Lahaye and Fanny Jandrain (Note: Jandrain was a late replacement for Maureen Louys, who was absent due to testing positive for COVID-19.)	VivaCité	Jean-Louis Lahaye and Fanny Jandrain	Danira Boukhriss	
2021	Ketnet	Dutch audio description	Radio 2 (Final)	Anja Daems and Showbizz Bart	La Une, RTBF Auvio	Jean-Louis Lahaye and Fanny Jandrain	VivaCité	Jean-Louis Lahaye and Fanny Jandrain	Danira Boukhriss	
2022	één	Peter Van de Veire	No radio broadcast		La Une	Jean-Louis Lahaye and Maureen Louys	VivaCité	Jean-Louis Lahaye and Maureen Louys	David Jeanmotte	
2023	VRT 1	Peter Van de Veire	Radio 2	Peter Van de Veire	Tipik (SF1); La Une (SF2/Final)	Jean-Louis Lahaye and Maureen Louys	VivaCité	Jean-Louis Lahaye and Maureen Louys	Bart Cannaerts	
2024	VRT 1	Peter Van de Veire	Radio 2 (Final)	Peter Van de Veire	Tipik (SF1); La Une (SF2/Final)	Jean-Louis Lahaye and Maureen Louys	VivaCité (Final)	Jean-Louis Lahaye and Maureen Louys	Livia Dushkoff	
2025	VRT 1	Peter Van de Veire	Radio 2 (Final)	Peter Van de Veire	La Une (SF1/Final); Tipik (SF2)	Jean-Louis Lahaye and Joëlle Scoriels	No radio broadcast		Manu Van Acker	
2026	VRT 1	Peter Van de Veire	No radio broadcast		La Une (SF1/Final); Tipik (SF2)	Jean-Louis Lahaye and Fanny Jandrain	No radio broadcast		Sandra Kim	

== Photo gallery ==
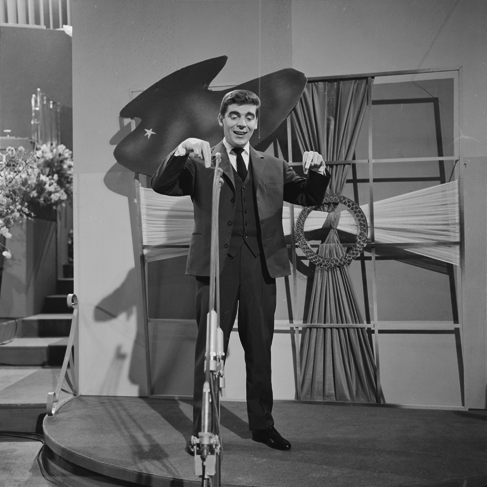
Fud Leclerc performing "Ma petite chatte" in Hilversum (1958)

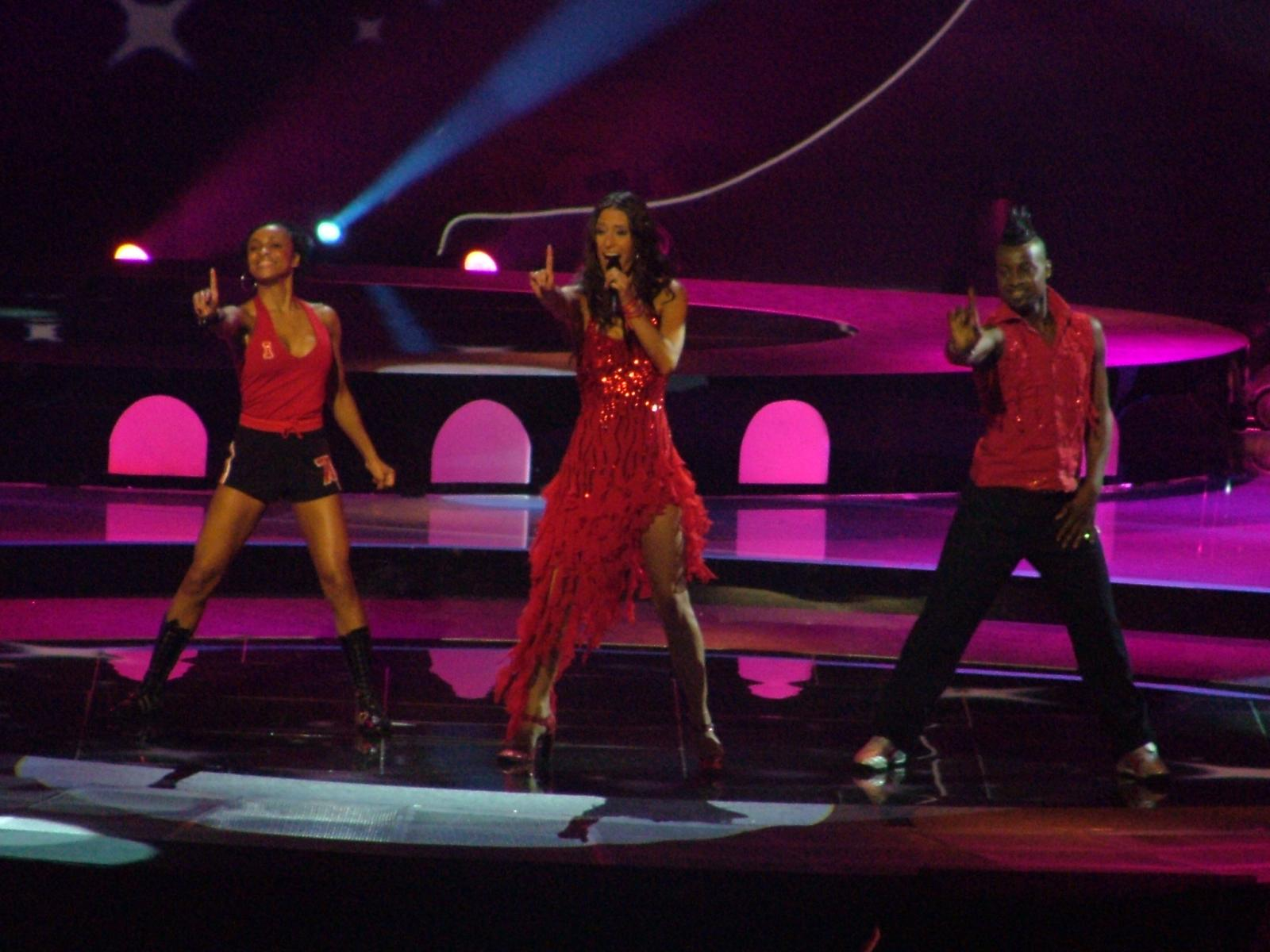
Xandee performing "1 Life" in Istanbul (2004)

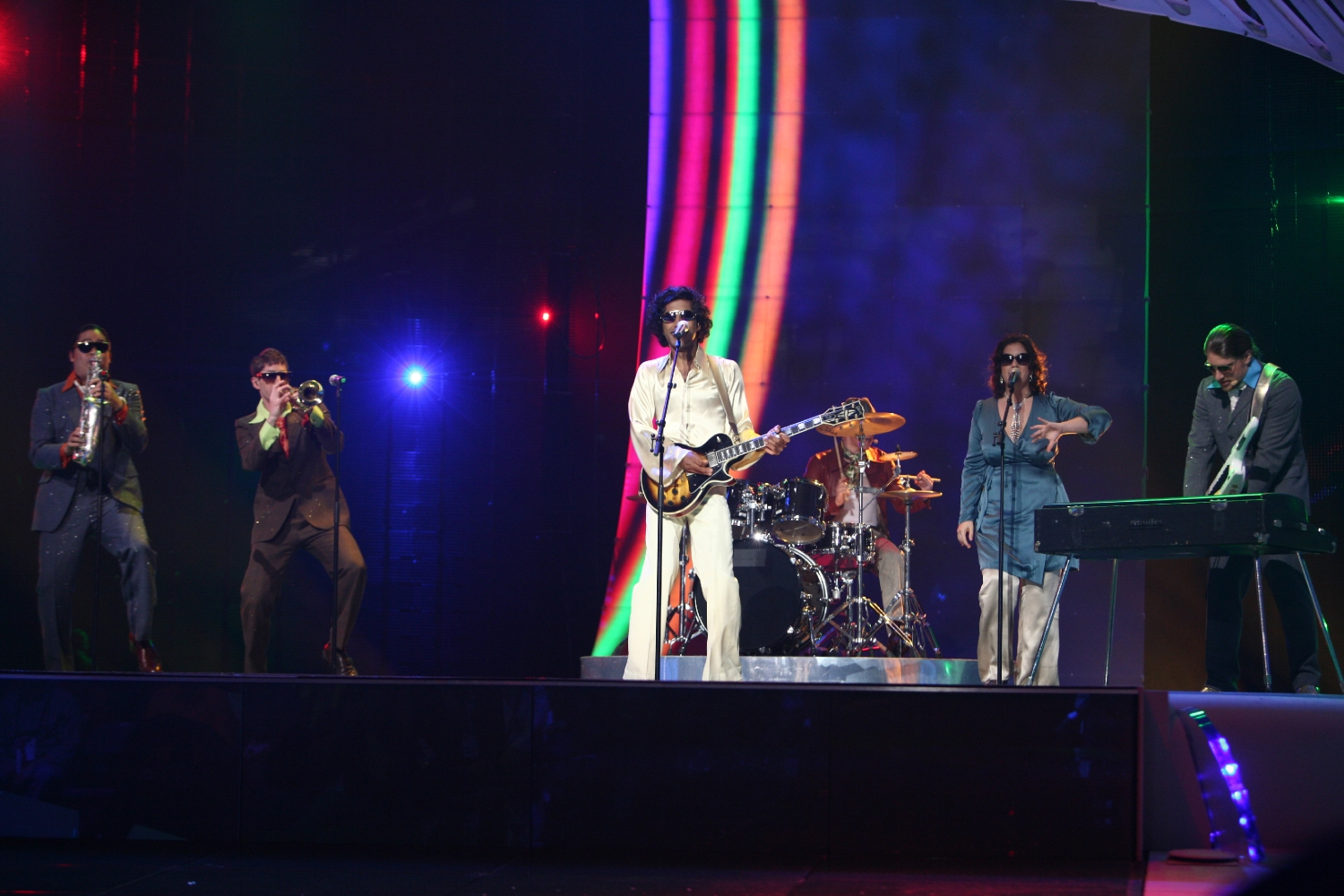
The KMG's performing "Love Power" in Helsinki (2007)

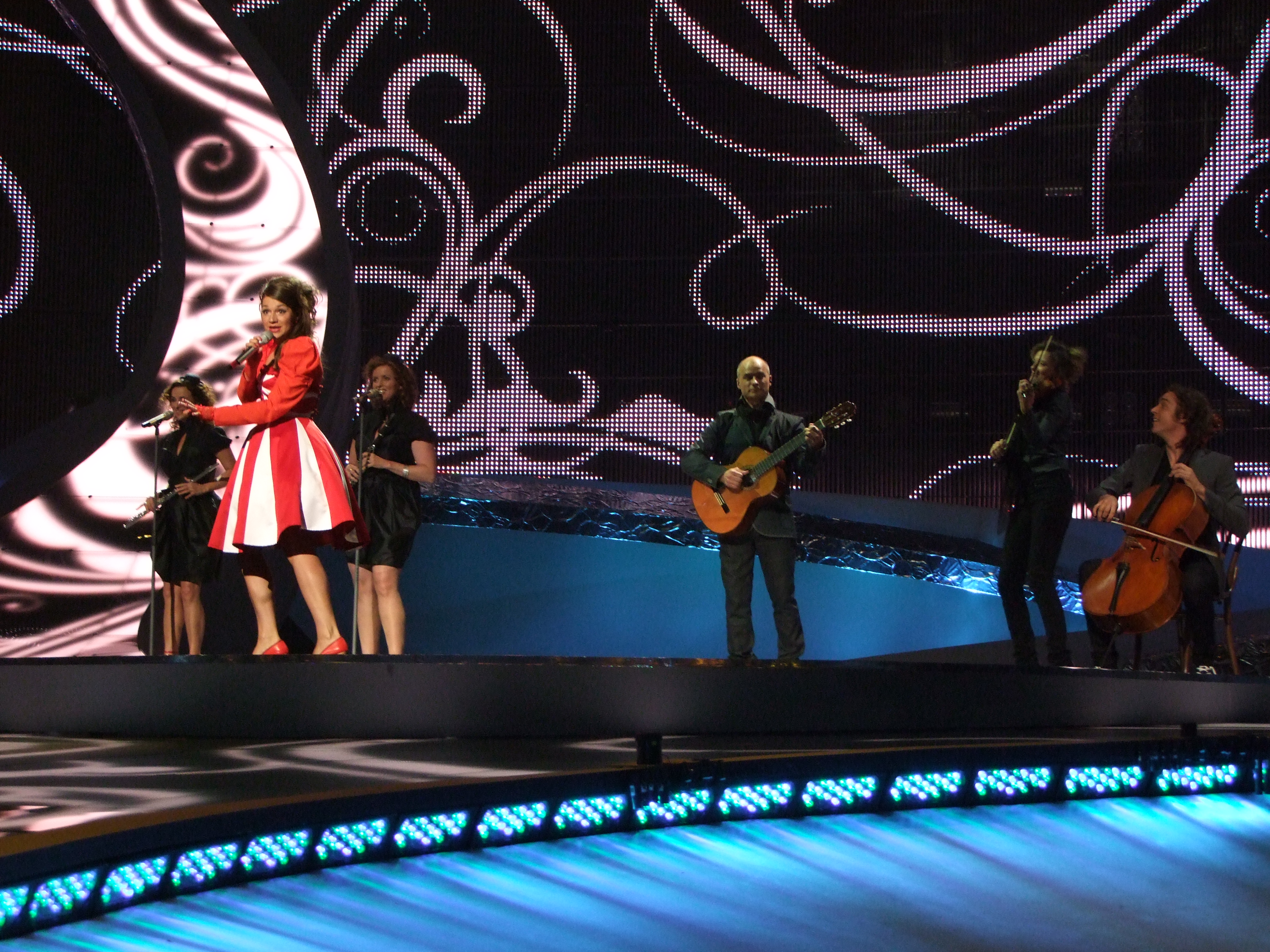
Ishtar performing "O Julissi" in Belgrade (2008)

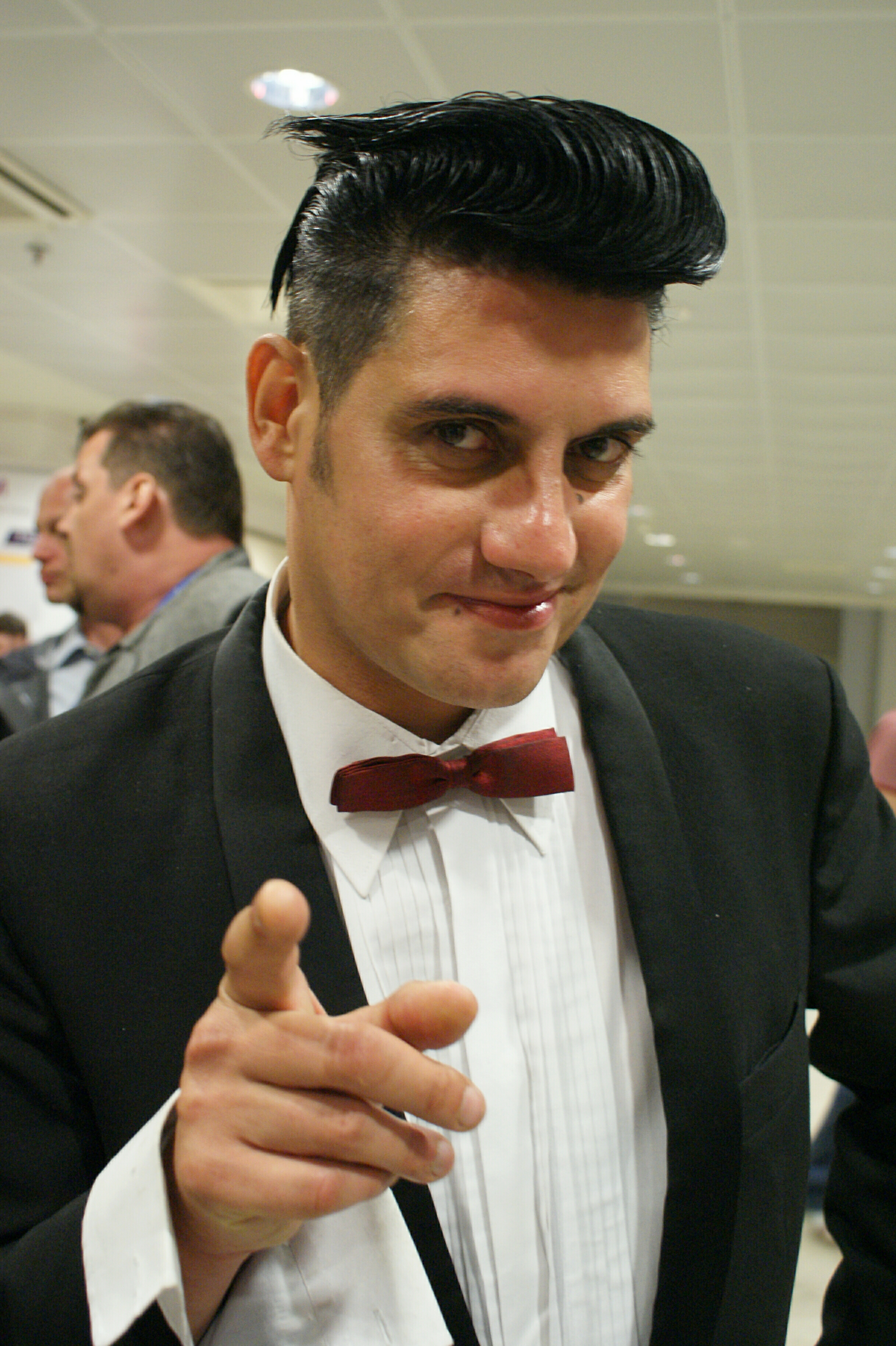
Copycat in Moscow (2009)

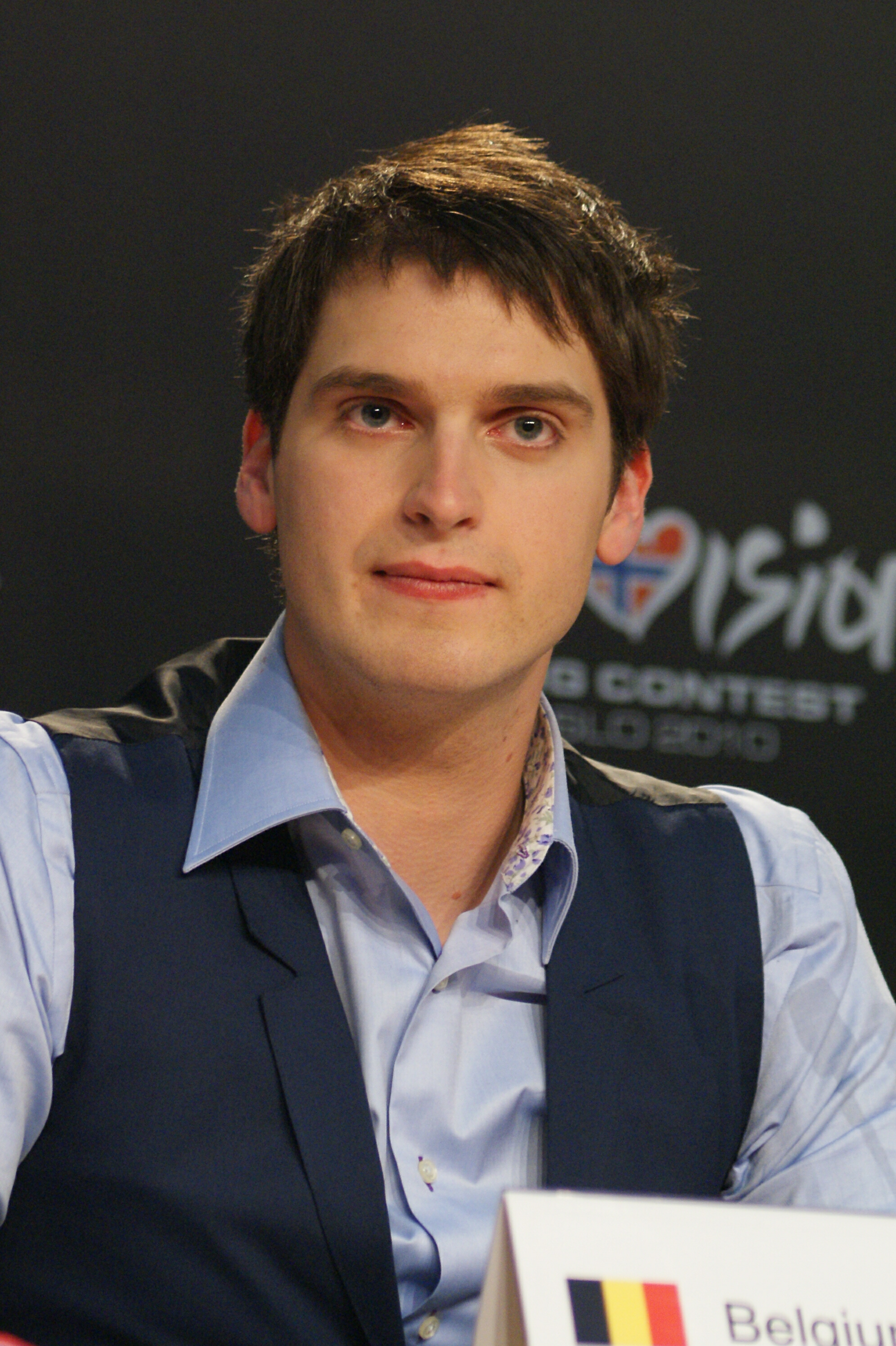
Tom Dice in Oslo (2010)

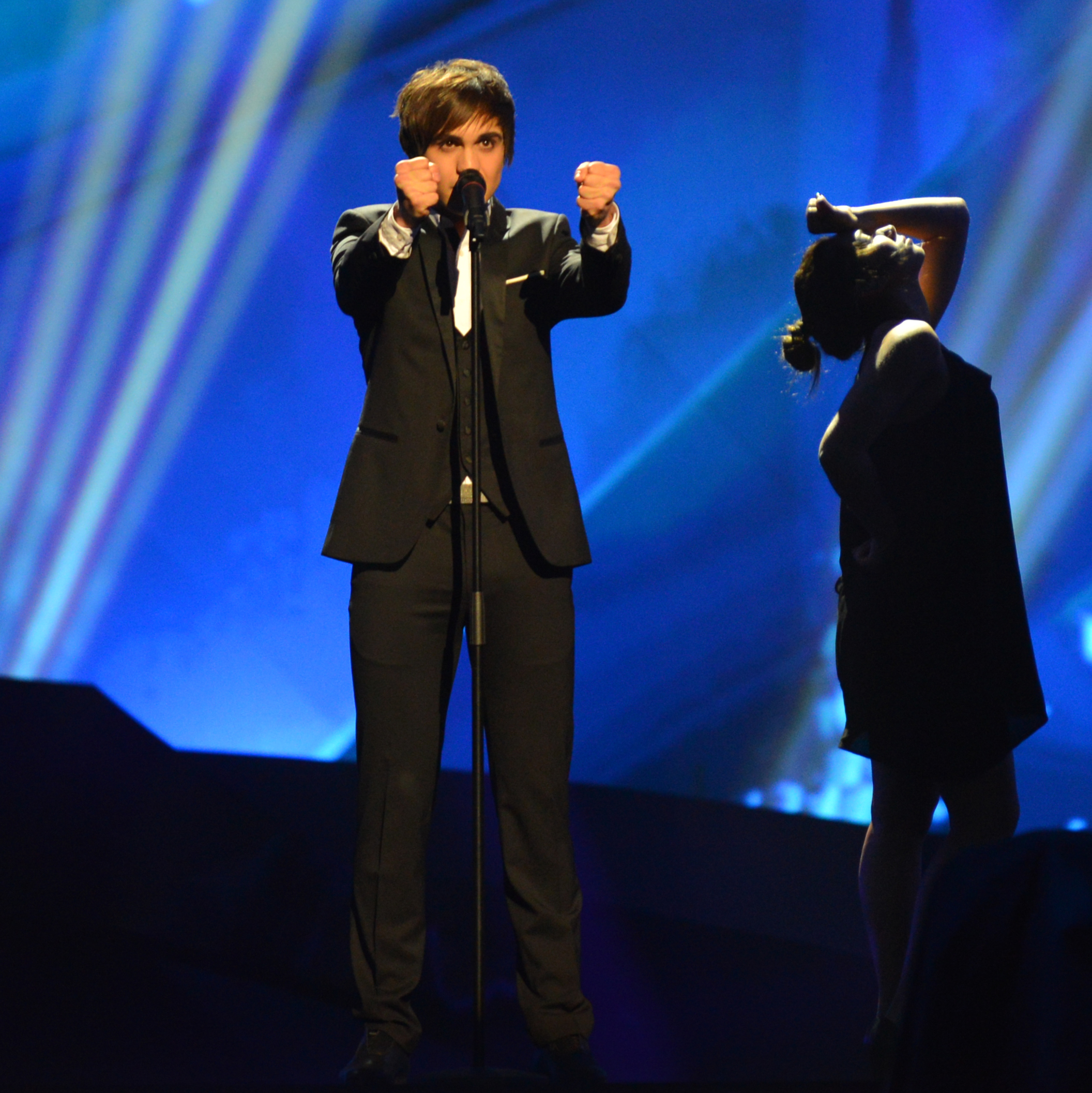
Roberto Bellarosa performing "Love Kills" in Malmö (2013)

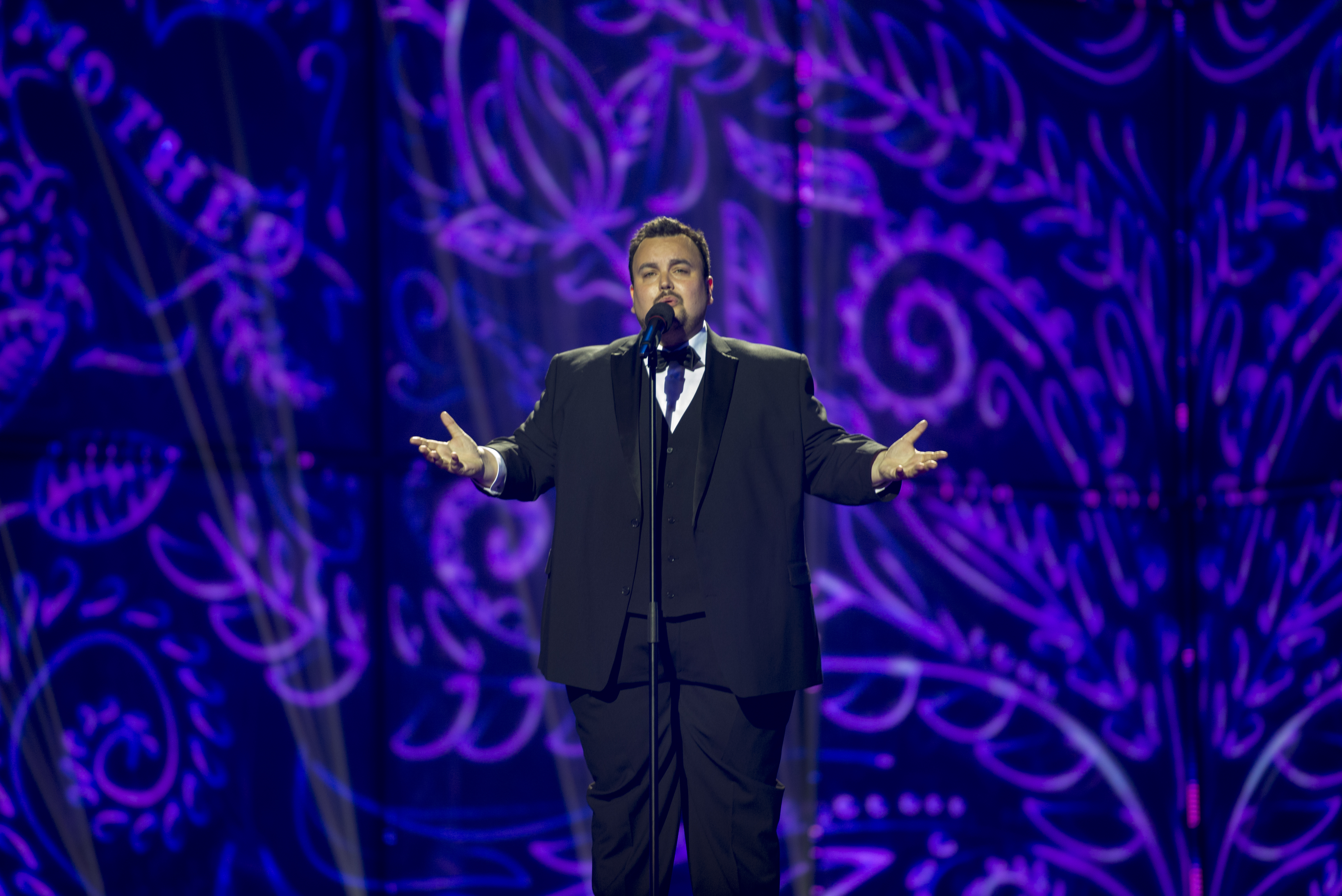
Axel Hirsoux performing "Mother" in Copenhagen (2014)

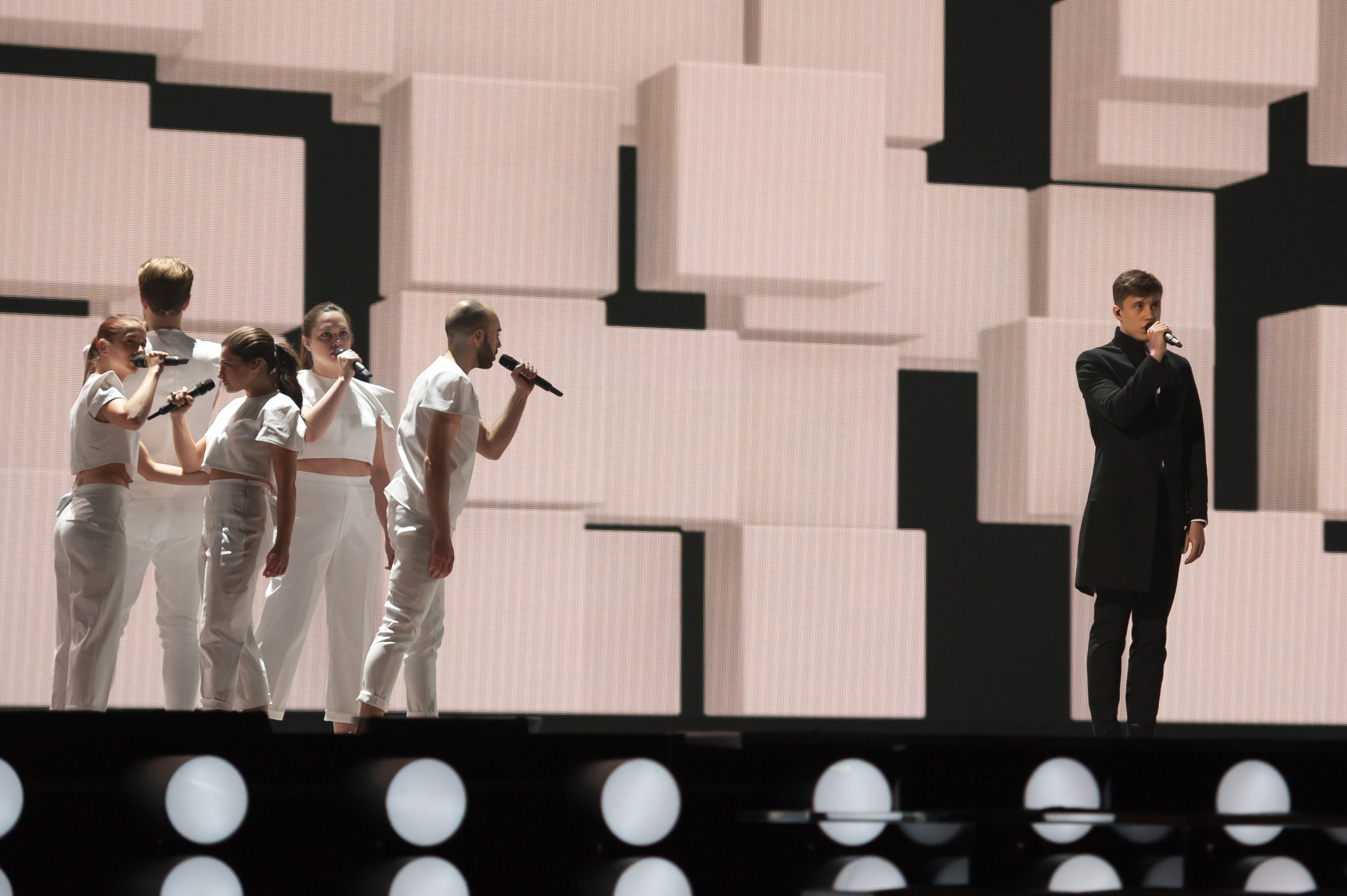
Loïc Nottet performing "Rhythm Inside" in Vienna (2015)

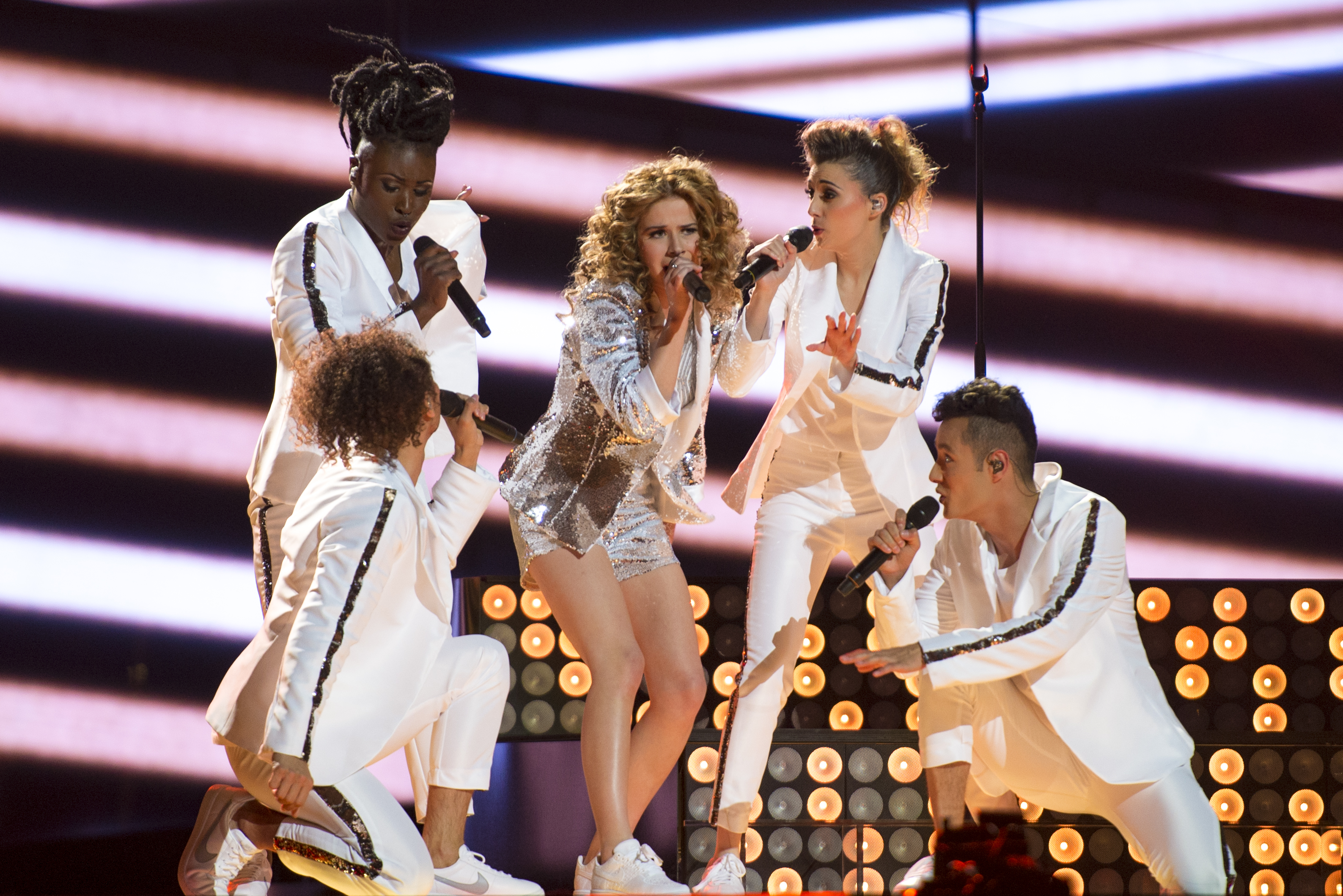
Laura Tesoro performing "What's the Pressure" in Stockholm (2016)

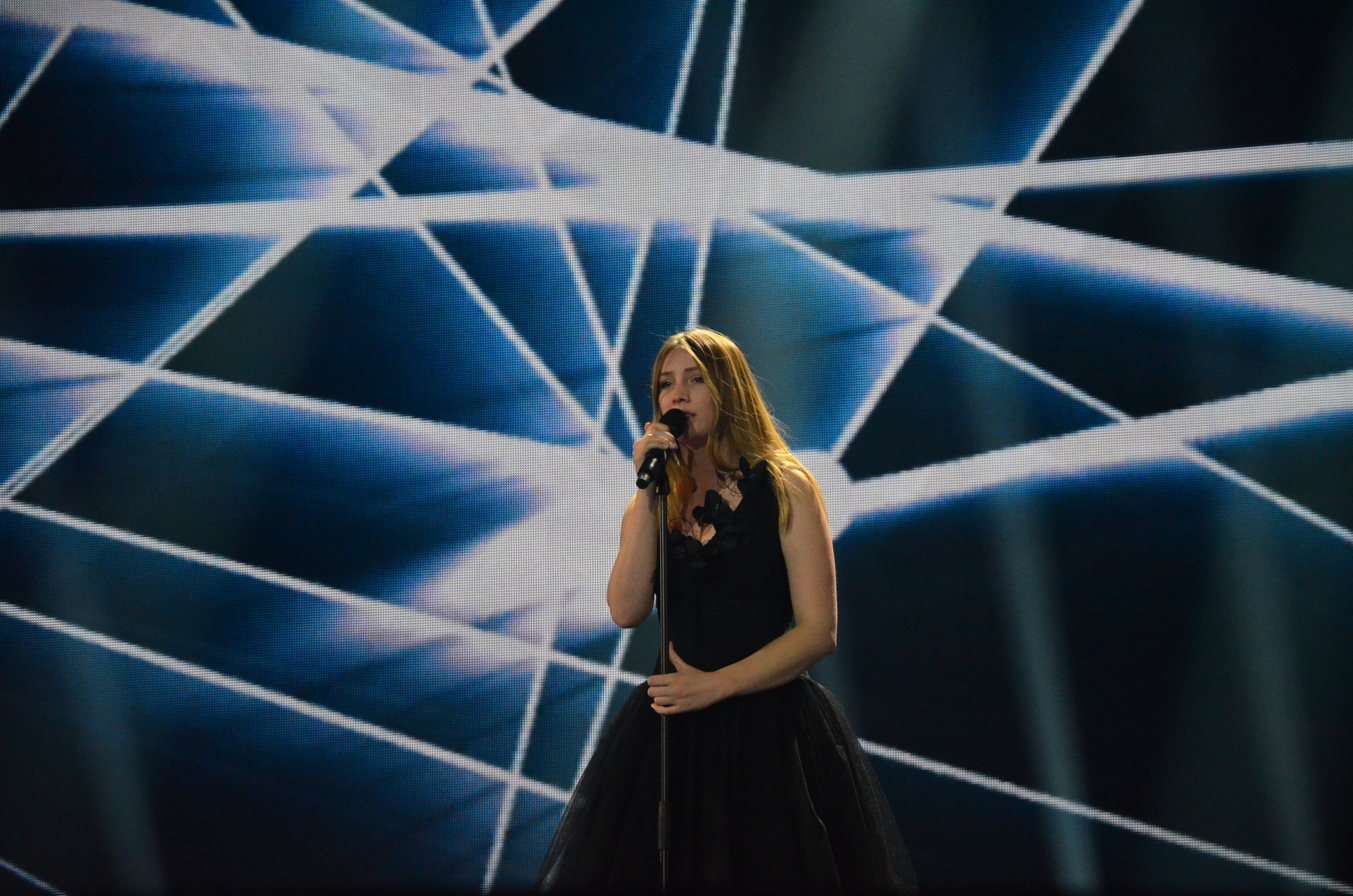
Blanche performing "City Lights" in Kyiv (2017)

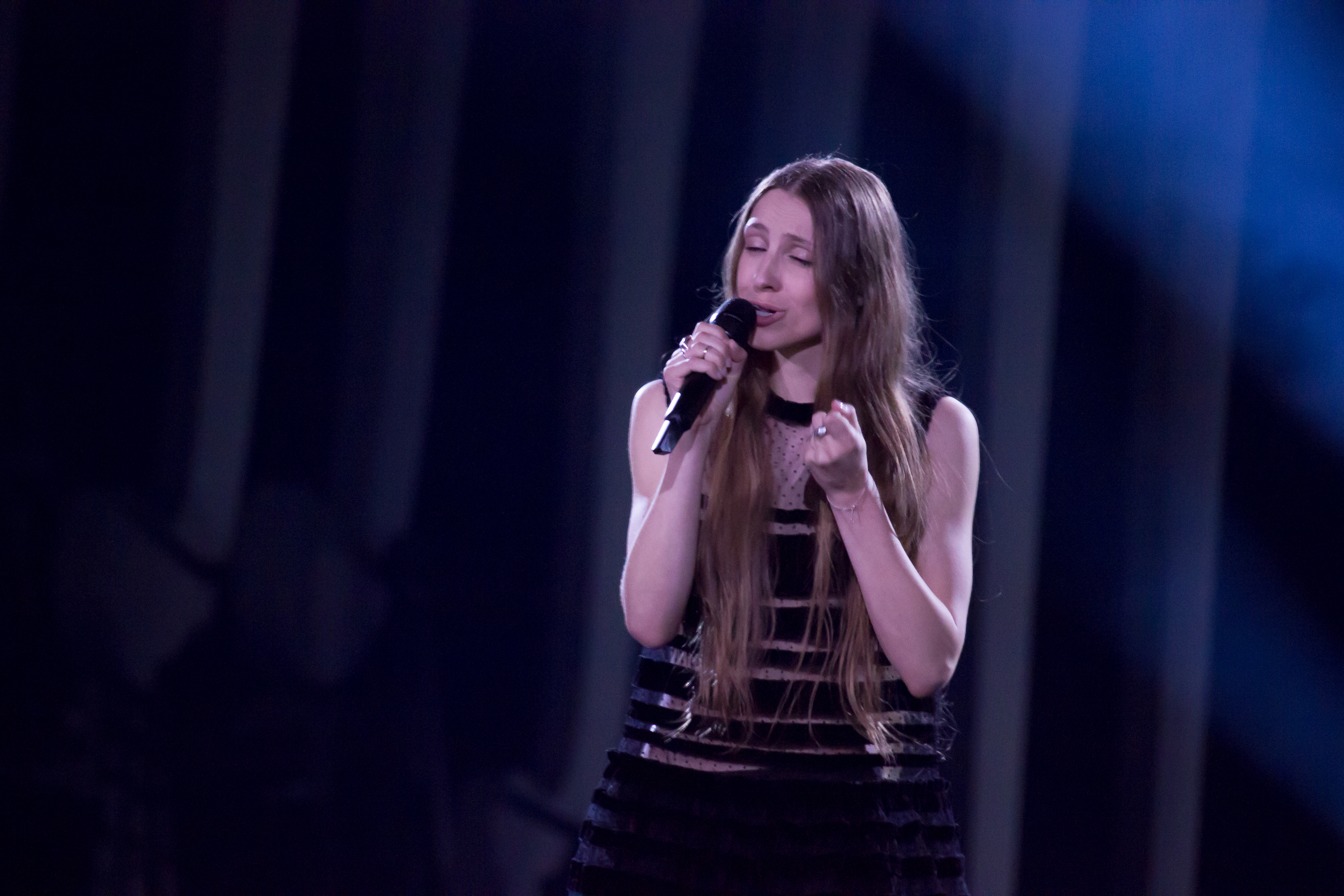
Sennek performing "A Matter of Time" in Lisbon (2018)

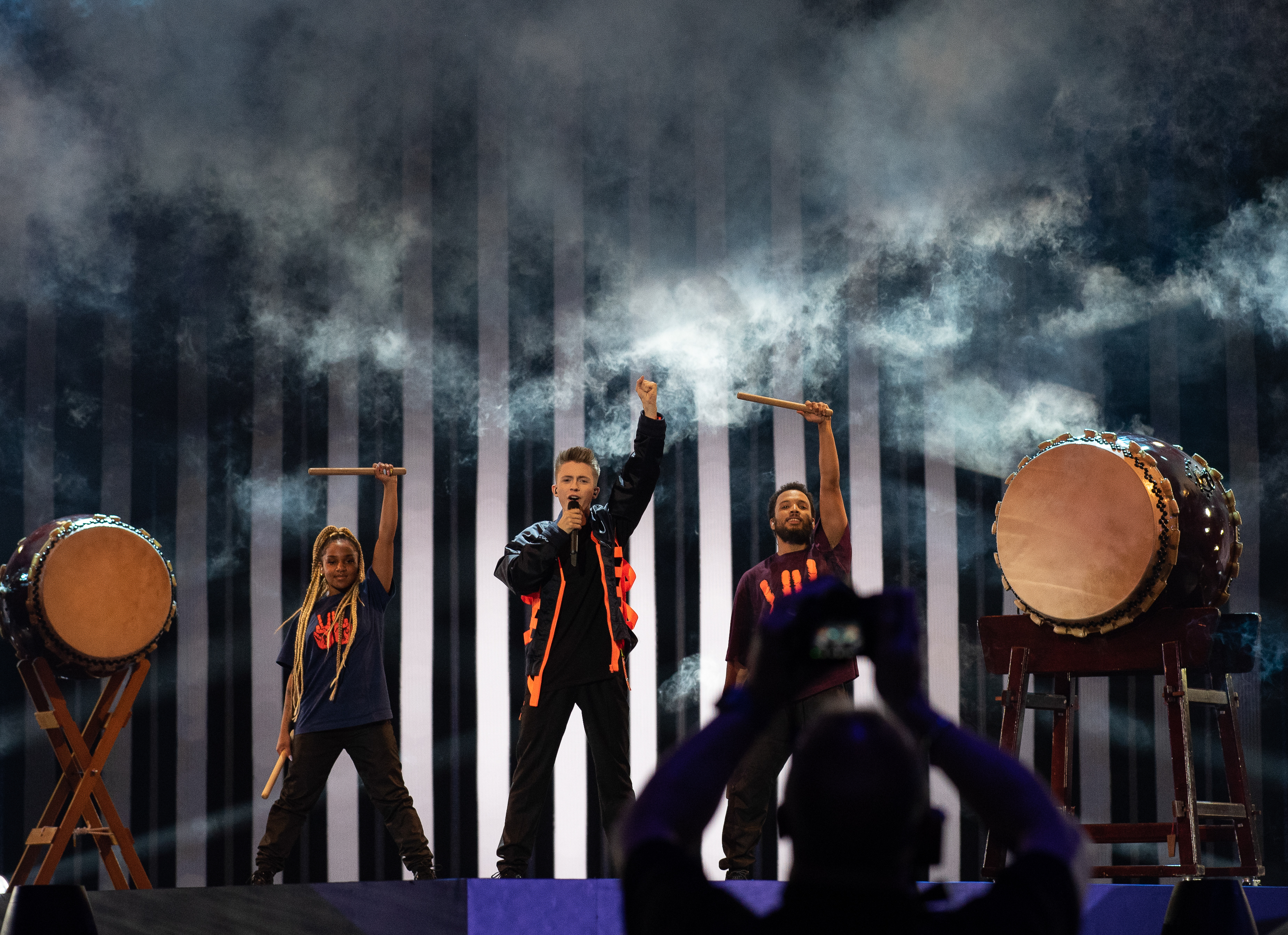
Eliot performing "Wake Up" in Tel Aviv (2019)

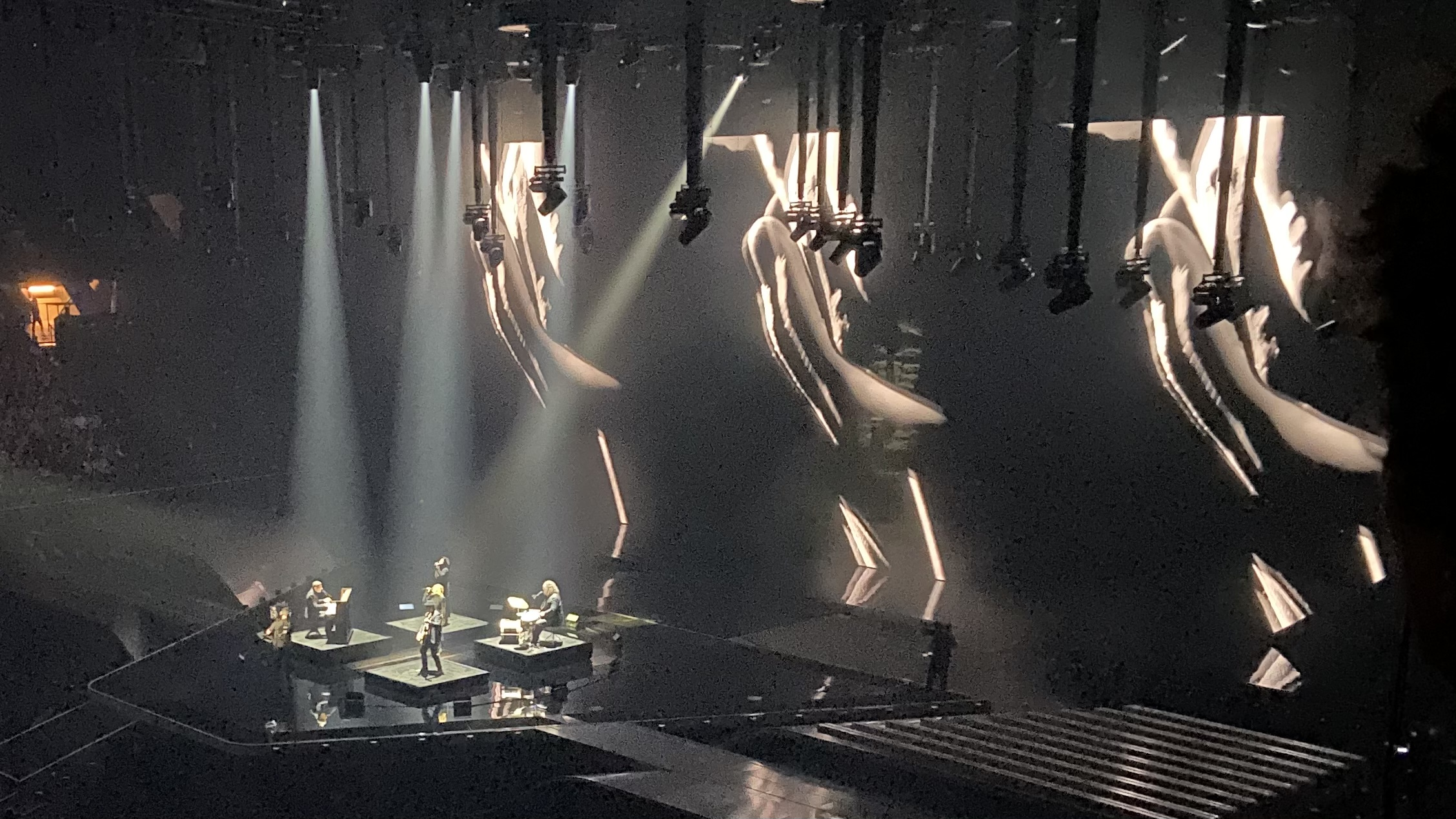
Hooverphonic performing "The Wrong Place" in Rotterdam (2021)

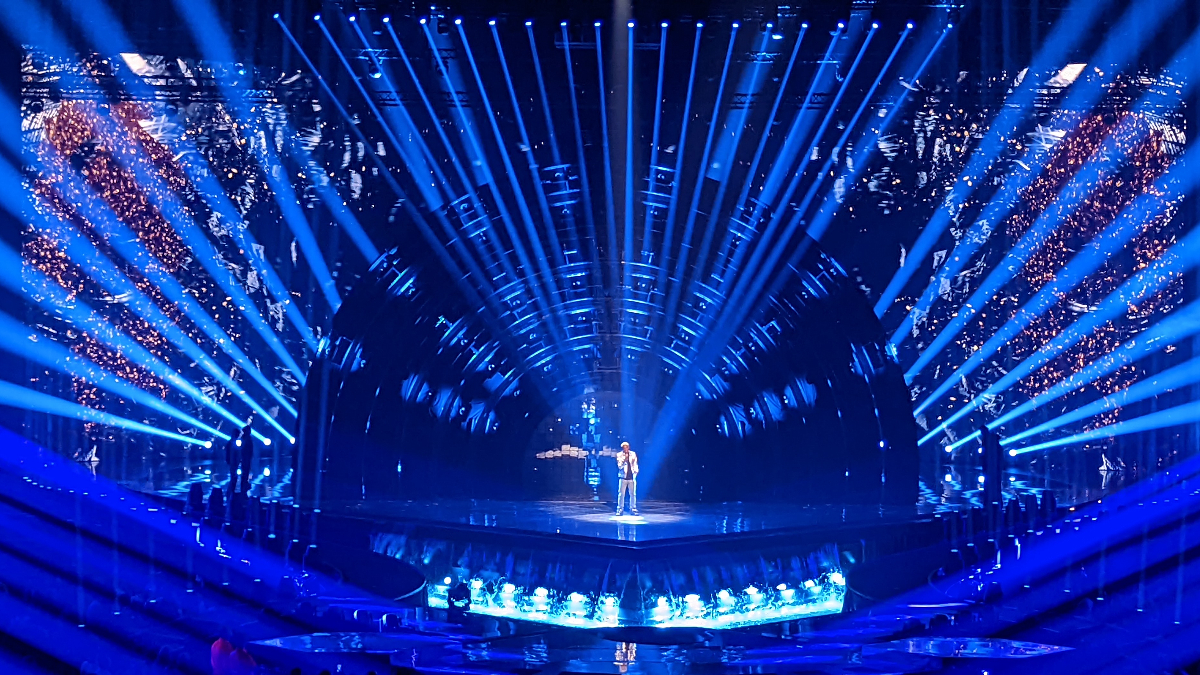
Jérémie Makiese performing "Miss You" in Turin (2022)

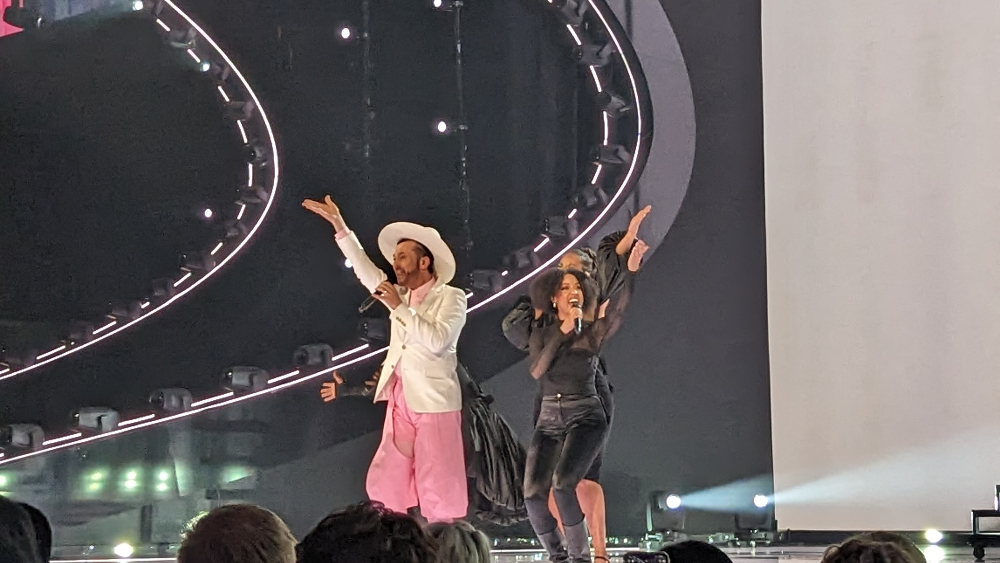
Gustaph performing "Because of You" in Liverpool (2023)

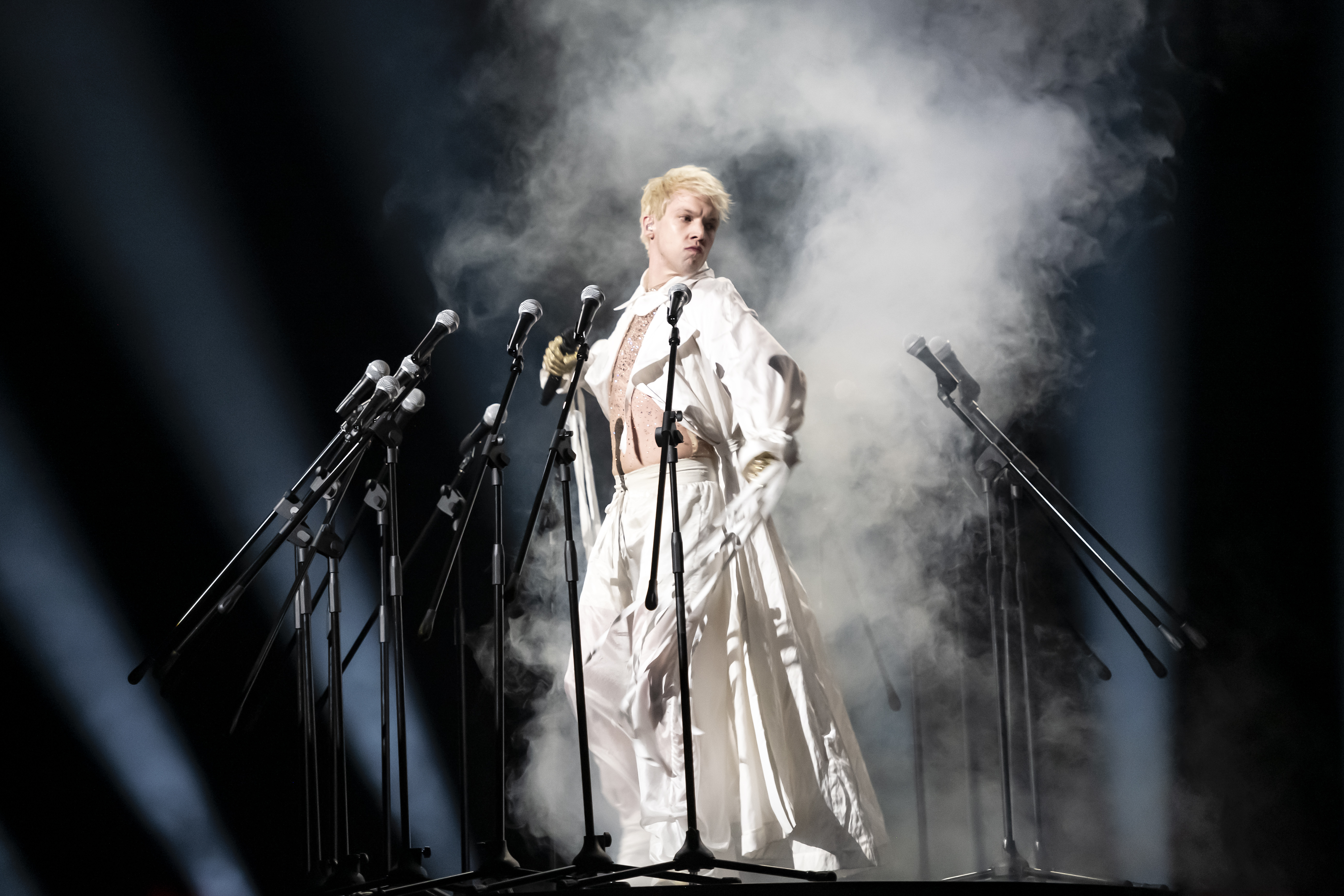
Mustii performing "Before the Party's Over" in Malmö (2024)

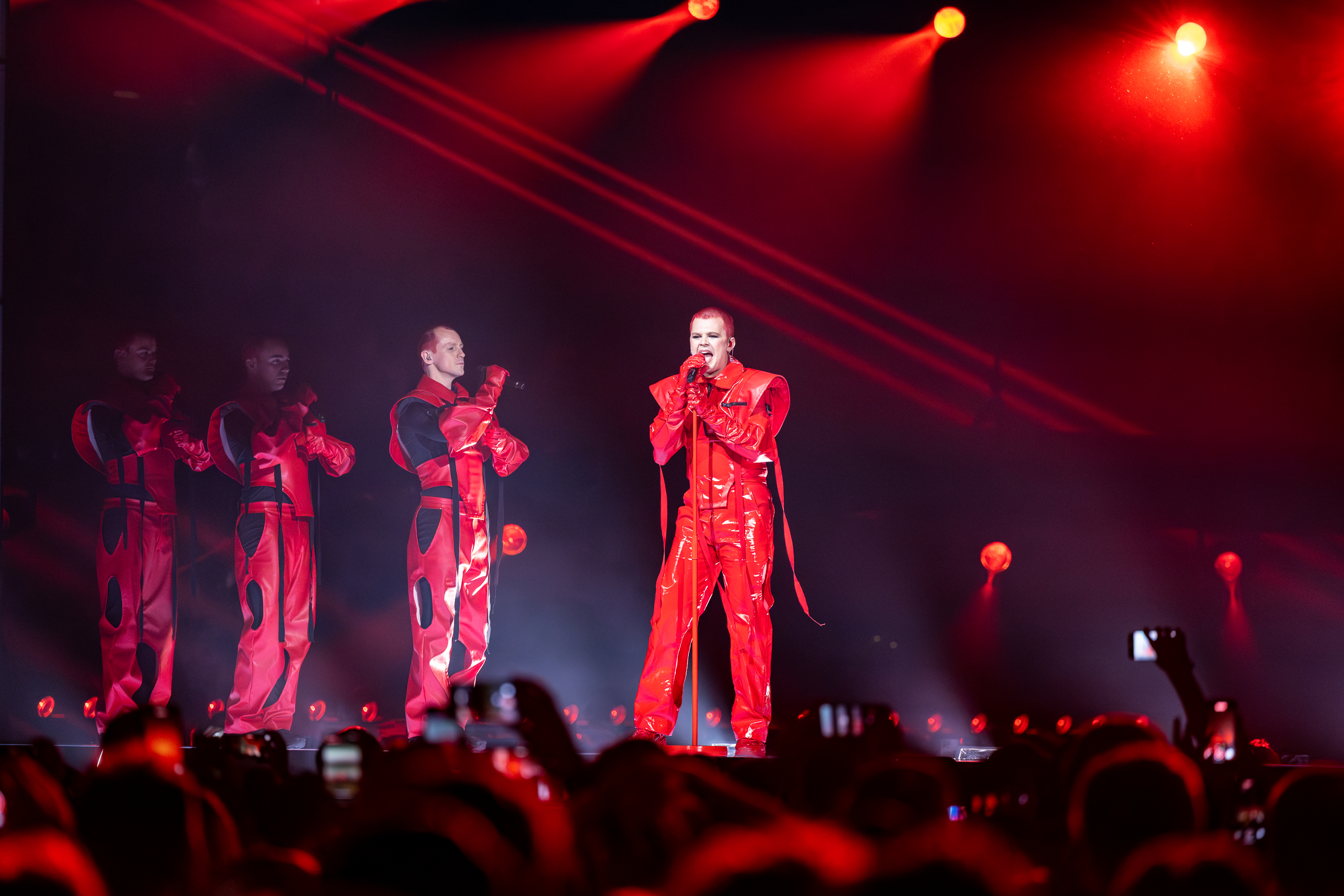
Red Sebastian performing "Strobe Lights" in Basel (2025)

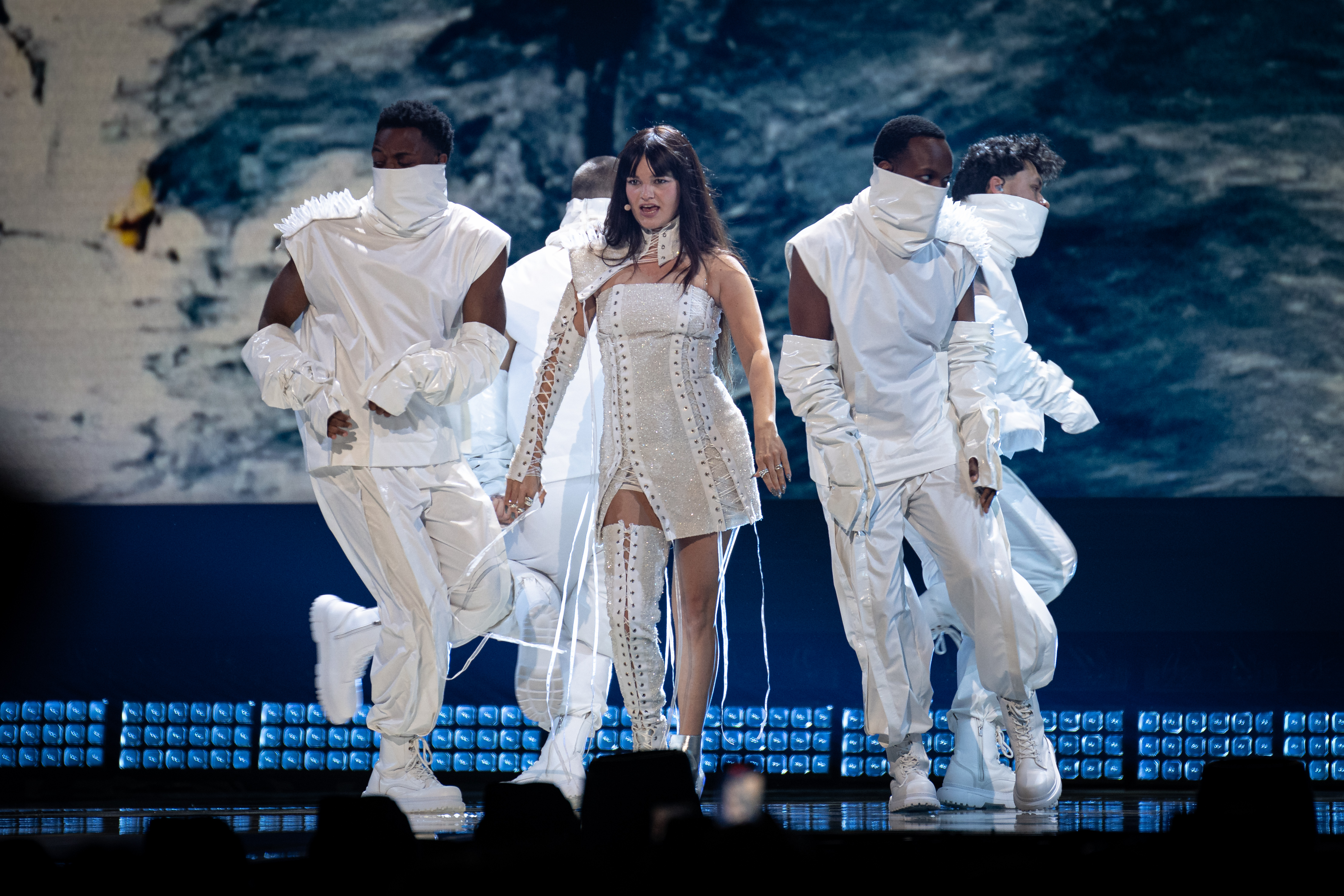
Essyla performing "Dancing on the Ice" in Vienna (2026)

== See also ==
- Belgium in the Junior Eurovision Song Contest – Junior version of the Eurovision Song Contest.
