= Belgium in the Eurovision Song Contest 2007 =

- Eurovision Song Contest 2007
- Participating broadcaster: Radio-télévision belge de la Communauté française (RTBF)
- Country: Belgium
- Selection process: Internal selection
- Announcement date: Artist: 20 February 2007; Song: 23 February 2007

Competing entry
- Song: "Love Power"
- Artist: The KMG's
- Songwriters: Paul Curtiz; Wakas Ashiq

Placement
- Semi-final result: Failed to qualify (26th)

Participation chronology

Belgium was represented at the Eurovision Song Contest 2007 with the song "Love Power", written by Paul Curtiz and Wakas Ashiq, and performed by the band The KMG's. The Belgian participating broadcaster, Walloon Radio-télévision belge de la Communauté française (RTBF), internally selected its entry for the contest. The song, "Love Power", was released on 23 February 2007 and officially presented to the public on 26 February 2007. This was the first time that a Walloon entry was performed in English at the Eurovision Song Contest.

Belgium competed in the semi-final of the Eurovision Song Contest which took place on 10 May 2007. Performing during the show in position 24, "Love Power" was not announced among the top 10 entries of the semi-final and therefore did not qualify to compete in the final. It was later revealed that Belgium placed twenty-sixth out of the 28 participating countries in the semi-final with 14 points.

== Background ==
Prior to the 2007 contest, Belgium had participated in the Eurovision Song Contest forty-eight times since its debut as one of seven countries to take part in 1956. Since then, the country has won the contest on one occasion in 1986 with the song "J'aime la vie" performed by Sandra Kim. Following the introduction of semi-finals for the 2004 contest, Belgium had been featured in only one final. In 2006, the song "Je t'adore" performed by Kate Ryan, placed twelfth in the semi-final failing to advance to the final.

The Belgian participation in the contest alternates between two broadcasters: Flemish Vlaamse Radio- en Televisieomroeporganisatie (VRT) and Walloon Radio-télévision belge de la Communauté française (RTBF) at the time, with both broadcasters sharing the broadcasting rights. Both broadcasters –and their predecessors– had selected the Belgian entry using national finals and internal selections in the past. In 2005 and 2006, both RTBF and VRT organised a national final in order to select the Belgian entry. On 5 December 2006, RTBF confirmed its participation in the 2007 contest and internally selected both the artist and song.

== Before Eurovision ==
=== Internal selection ===
The Belgian entry for the Eurovision Song Contest 2007 was selected via an internal selection by RTBF. On 20 February 2007, the broadcaster announced during the La Une programme Bonnie & Clyde, hosted by Jacques Mercier and Armelle Gysen, that they had selected the band The KMG's to represent Belgium. Among artists that were previously rumoured to be selected for the competition included the bands Été 67 and Saule et les Pleureurs. The song the KMG's would perform at the contest, "Love Power", was released online by Flemish broadcaster VRT on 23 February 2007 and officially presented to the public the following day during the VivaCité radio programme Tip Top. The song was written by member of the band Wakas Ashiq along with Paul Curtiz, and was the first Walloon entry performed in English. The first live televised performance of the song occurred 26 February 2007 during Bonnie & Clyde.

== At Eurovision ==
According to Eurovision rules, all nations with the exceptions of the host country, the "Big Four" (France, Germany, Spain and the United Kingdom) and the ten highest placed finishers in the 2006 contest are required to qualify from the semi-final on 10 May 2007 in order to compete for the final on 12 May 2007. On 12 March 2007, a special allocation draw was held which determined the running order for the semi-final and Belgium was set to perform in position 24, following the entry from Estonia and before the entry from Slovenia.

The semi-final and the final was broadcast in Belgium by both the Flemish and Walloon broadcasters. VRT broadcast the shows on één with commentary in Dutch by Bart Peeters and André Vermeulen. RTBF televised the shows on La Une with commentary in French by Jean-Pierre Hautier and Jean-Louis Lahaye. All shows were also broadcast by RTBF on La Première with commentary in French by Patrick Duhamel and Corinne Boulangier, and by VRT on Radio 2 with commentary in Dutch by Michel Follet and Sven Pichal. RTBF appointed Maureen Louys as its spokesperson to announced the Belgian votes during the final.

=== Semi-final ===
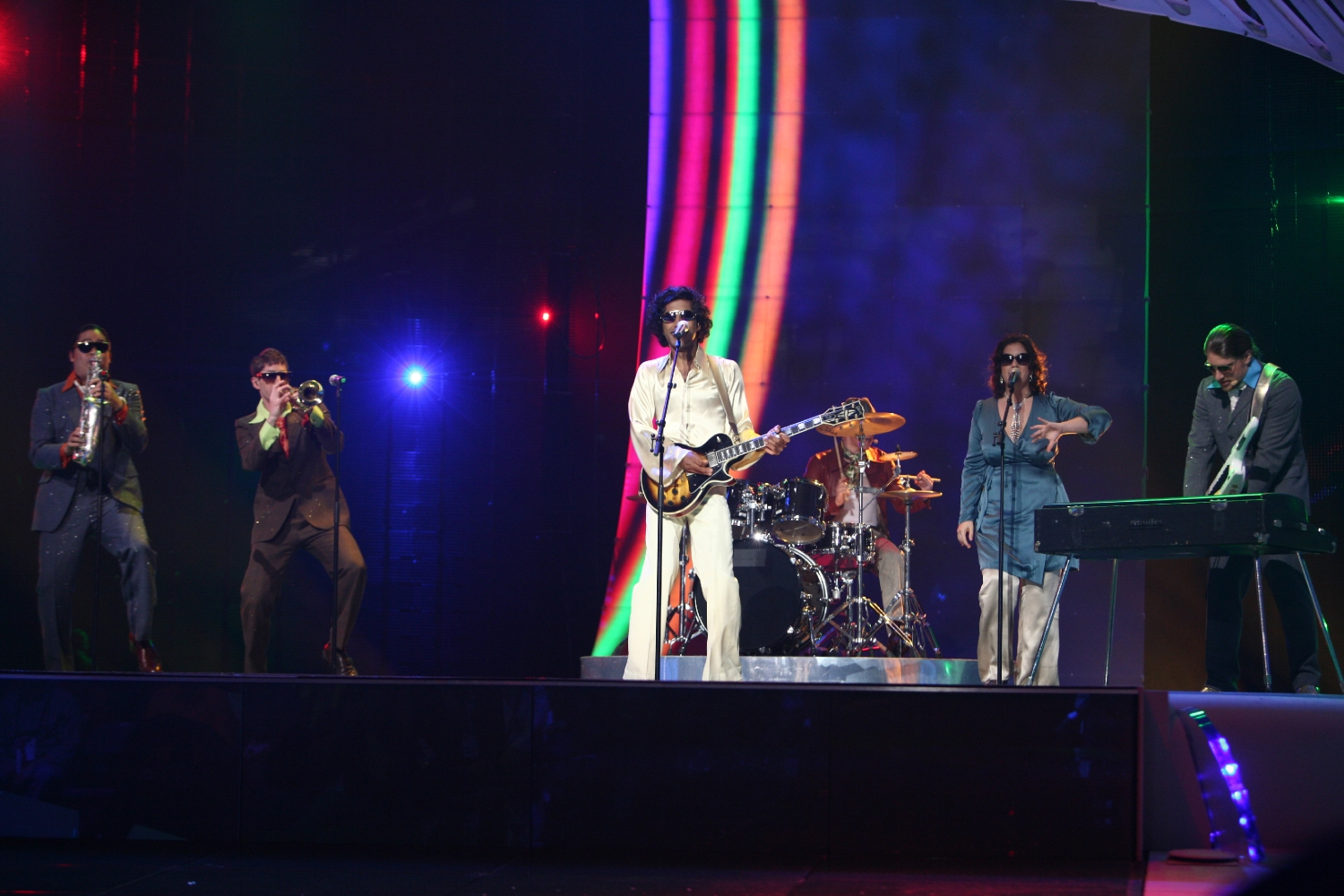
The KMG's during a rehearsal before the semi-final

The KMG's took part in technical rehearsals on 4 and 6 May, followed by dress rehearsals on 9 and 10 May. The Belgian performance featured the members of the KMG's performing on stage in a band set-up and dressed in 70s outfits. Due to the band originally consisting of nine members, three of them were not featured during the performance. The stage colours were red, orange, green and purple and the LED screens displayed neon rainbows and swirling bands on a black background as well as purple fireworks.

At the end of the show, Belgium was not announced among the top 10 entries in the semi-final and therefore failed to qualify to compete in the final. It was later revealed that Belgium placed twenty-sixth in the semi-final, receiving a total of 14 points.

=== Voting ===
Below is a breakdown of points awarded to Belgium and awarded by Belgium in the semi-final and grand final of the contest. The nation awarded its 12 points to Turkey in the semi-final and the final of the contest.

==== Points awarded to Belgium ====
Points awarded to Belgium (Semi-final)
Score	Country
12 points	Georgia
10 points	
8 points	
7 points	
6 points	
5 points	
4 points	
3 points	
2 points	Netherlands
1 point	

==== Points awarded by Belgium ====
Points awarded by Belgium (Semi-final)
Score	Country
12 points	Turkey
10 points	Netherlands
8 points	Latvia
7 points	Hungary
6 points	Slovenia
5 points	Cyprus
4 points	Serbia
3 points	Portugal
2 points	Bulgaria
1 point	Georgia

Points awarded by Belgium (Final)
Score	Country
12 points	Turkey
10 points	Armenia
8 points	Greece
7 points	Serbia
6 points	Georgia
5 points	Hungary
4 points	Bulgaria
3 points	Spain
2 points	Slovenia
1 point	Ukraine
