= Belgium in the Eurovision Song Contest 2009 =

- Eurovision Song Contest 2009
- Participating broadcaster: Radio-télévision belge de la Communauté française (RTBF)
- Country: Belgium
- Selection process: Internal selection
- Announcement date: Artist: 17 February 2009; Song: 10 March 2009

Competing entry
- Song: "Copycat"
- Artist: Copycat
- Songwriters: Benjamin Schoos; Jacques Duvall

Placement
- Semi-final result: Failed to qualify (17th)

Participation chronology

Belgium was represented at the Eurovision Song Contest 2009 with the song "Copycat", written by Benjamin Schoos and Jacques Duvall, and performed by the group Copycat. The Belgian participating broadcaster, Walloon Radio-télévision belge de la Communauté française (RTBF), internally selected its entry for the contest. The performers were announced on 17 February, and the song was presented to the public on 10 March 2009.

Belgium was drawn to compete in the first semi-final of the Eurovision Song Contest which took place on 12 May 2009. Performing during the show in position 3, "Copycat" was not announced among the 10 qualifying entries of the first semi-final and therefore did not qualify to compete in the final. It was later revealed that Belgium placed seventeenth out of the 18 participating countries in the semi-final with 1 point.

== Background ==
Prior to the 2009 contest, Belgium had participated in the Eurovision Song Contest fifty times since its debut as one of seven countries to take part in 1956. Since then, the country has won the contest on one occasion in 1986 with the song "J'aime la vie" performed by Sandra Kim. Following the introduction of semi-finals for the 2004 contest, Belgium had been featured in only one final. In 2008, "O Julissi" by Ishtar placed seventeenth in the first semi-final and failed to advance to the final.

The Belgian participation in the contest alternates between two broadcasters: Flemish Vlaamse Radio- en Televisieomroeporganisatie (VRT) and Walloon Radio-télévision belge de la Communauté française (RTBF) at the time, with both broadcasters sharing the broadcasting rights. Both broadcasters –and their predecessors– have selected the Belgian entry using national finals and internal selections in the past. In 2007, RTBF internally selected both the artist and song, while in 2008, VRT organised the national final Eurosong in order to select the entry. On 28 July 2008, RTBF confirmed its participation in the 2009 contest and continued its internal selection procedure.

== Before Eurovision ==
=== Internal selection ===
The Belgian entry for the 2009 Eurovision Song Contest was selected via an internal selection by RTBF. On 17 February 2009, the broadcaster announced that they had selected Patrick Ouchène to represent Belgium in Moscow, performing the song "Copycat" at the contest. The song was written by Benjamin Schoos and Eric Verwilghen under the pseudonymn Jacques Duvall, and was selected in late 2008 from 10 entries shortlisted among proposals submitted by record companies. Among artists that were previously rumoured to be selected for the competition included Elvis Junior (Franz Goovaerts) following a teaser released by RTBF in early February 2009. Ouchène would ultimately perform as the lead singer of the group Copycat, specifically created for the Eurovision Song Contest with the remaining members being backing vocalists Miss T Blue (Marie-Ange Tchai) and Miss D Lite (Desta Hailé), bassist Benjamin Schoos and cellist Lenn Dauphin.

On 10 March 2009, RTBF held a press conference at the Mirano Continental hotel in Brussels where "Copycat" was presented to the public. The music video for the song, which featured an animation sequence by Philippe Geluck, was released on the same day of the presentation. In regards to the song, Patrick Ouchène stated: "Many people will think it's kitsch and ridiculous, but I think that this is a big opportunity to give media exposure to the music style I'm bringing. When we recorded the song we made it very much 'pop' and 'Eurovision' but you recognize the rockabilly I represent. For me it's a way to put this music style that is popular from Russia over Turkey to Spain and Italy in the spotlight. I'll have two missions: represent Belgium and defend this music style."

=== Controversy ===
Following the release of "Copycat", the Belgian and Dutch fan club of Elvis Presley, ElvisMatters, complained that the song was offensive to the singer and called on the European Broadcasting Union (EBU) to disqualify the Belgian entry as it violated the Eurovision Song Contest rules which prohibit unacceptable language. The song was ultimately deemed eligible for the contest by the Eurovision Song Contest Reference Group.

=== Promotion ===
Copycat specifically promoted "Copycat" as the Belgian Eurovision entry on 18 April 2009 by performing during the Eurovision Promo Concert, which was held at the Amsterdam Marcanti venue in Amsterdam, Netherlands and hosted by Marga Bult and Maggie MacNeal. In addition to his international appearance, Copycat took part in promotional activities in Brussels and performed during an event held at the Place Sainte-Catherine/Sint-Katelijneplein on 18 and 19 April.

== At Eurovision ==
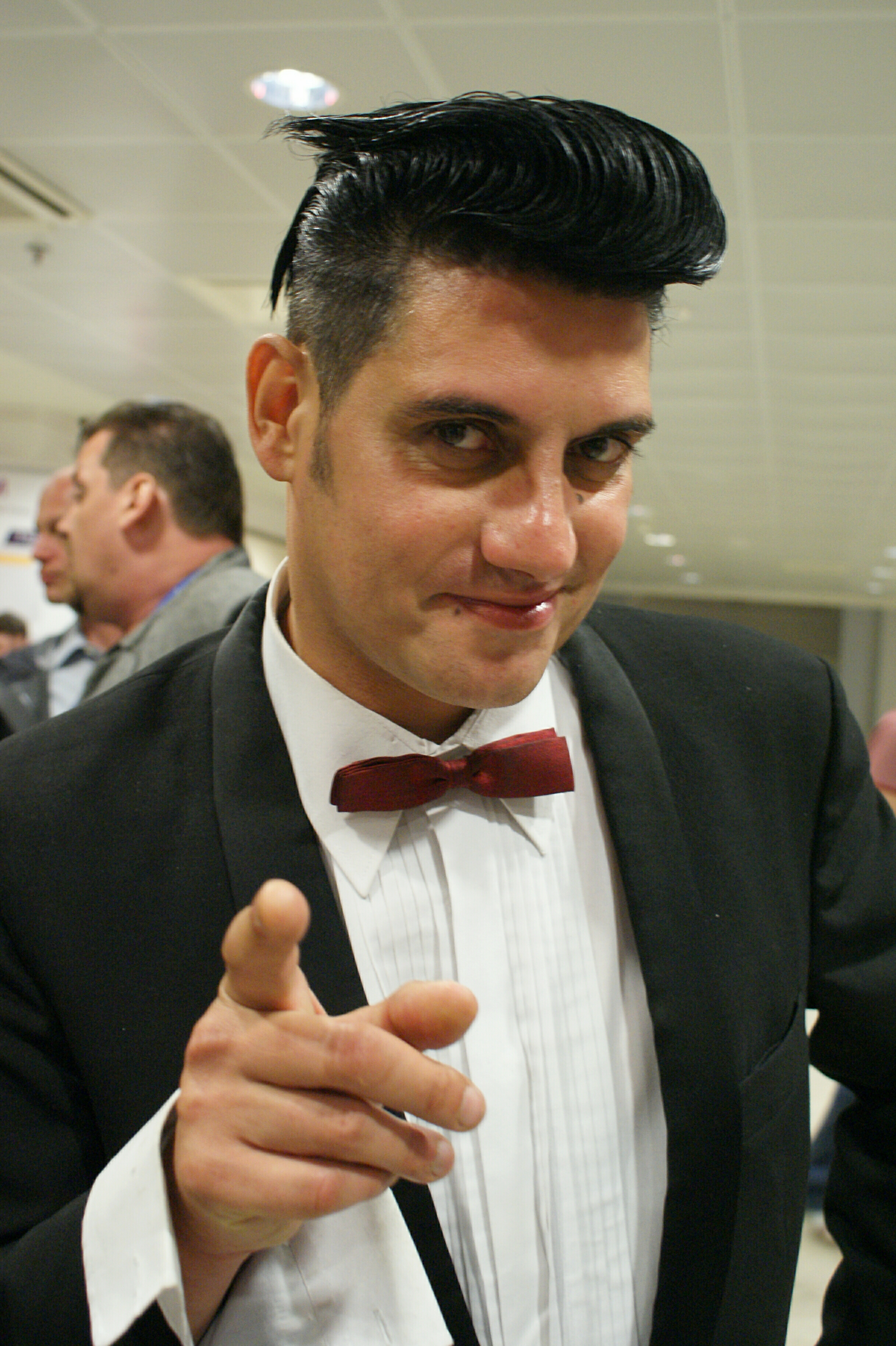
Patrick Ouchène at the Eurovision Song Contest 2009

According to Eurovision rules, all nations with the exceptions of the host country and the "Big Four" (France, Germany, Spain and the United Kingdom) are required to qualify from one of two semi-finals in order to compete for the final; the top nine songs from each semi-final as determined by televoting progress to the final, and a tenth was determined by back-up juries. The European Broadcasting Union (EBU) split up the competing countries into six different pots based on voting patterns from previous contests, with countries with favourable voting histories put into the same pot. On 30 January 2009, a special allocation draw was held which placed each country into one of the two semi-finals. Belgium was placed into the first semi-final, to be held on 12 May 2009. The running order for the semi-finals was decided through another draw on 16 March 2009 and Belgium was set to perform in position 3, following the entry from the Czech Republic and before the entry from Belarus.

The two semi-finals and the final was broadcast in Belgium by both the Flemish and Walloon broadcasters. VRT broadcast the shows on één and Radio 2 with commentary in Dutch by Anja Daems and André Vermeulen. RTBF televised the shows on La Une with commentary in French by Jean-Pierre Hautier and Jean-Louis Lahaye. All shows were also broadcast by RTBF on La Première with commentary in French by Patrick Duhamel and Corinne Boulangier. The Belgian spokesperson, who announced the Belgian votes during the final, was Maureen Louys.

=== Semi-final ===
Copycat took part in technical rehearsals on 3 and 7 May, followed by dress rehearsals on 11 and 12 May. The Belgian performance featured the members of Copycat performing on stage, with the group's lead singer Patrick Ouchène dressed in a glittery jacket and black trousers and the backing vocalists in shiny long dresses and wigs. The stage colours transitioned from black and white to red and back, and the LED screens and stage floor displayed the name of the group as well as animations of a cartoon cat that was taken from the music video of the song.

At the end of the show, Belgium was not announced among the top 10 entries in the first semi-final and therefore failed to qualify to compete in the final. It was later revealed that Belgium placed seventeenth in the semi-final, receiving a total of 1 point.

=== Voting ===
The voting system for 2009 involved each country awarding points from 1–8, 10 and 12, with the points in the final being decided by a combination of 50% national jury and 50% televoting. Each nation's jury consisted of five music industry professionals who are citizens of the country they represent. This jury judged each entry based on: vocal capacity; the stage performance; the song's composition and originality; and the overall impression by the act. In addition, no member of a national jury was permitted to be related in any way to any of the competing acts in such a way that they cannot vote impartially and independently.

Below is a breakdown of points awarded to Belgium and awarded by Belgium in the first semi-final and grand final of the contest. The nation awarded its 12 points to Turkey in the semi-final and the final of the contest.

==== Points awarded to Belgium ====
Points awarded to Belgium (Semi-final 1)
Score	Country
12 points	
10 points	
8 points	
7 points	
6 points	
5 points	
4 points	
3 points	
2 points	
1 point	Armenia

==== Points awarded by Belgium ====
Points awarded by Belgium (Semi-final 1)
Score	Country
12 points	Turkey
10 points	Armenia
8 points	Malta
7 points	Iceland
6 points	Portugal
5 points	Bosnia and Herzegovina
4 points	Sweden
3 points	Israel
2 points	Romania
1 point	Finland

Points awarded by Belgium (Final)
Score	Country
12 points	Turkey
10 points	Norway
8 points	Israel
7 points	Armenia
6 points	Portugal
5 points	Greece
4 points	Moldova
3 points	Azerbaijan
2 points	Germany
1 point	France

==== Detailed voting results ====
The following members comprised the Belgian jury:

- Marie-Paule Lemmens
- Pierre Guyaut
- Manu Champagne
- Corrado Falciglia
- Isabelle Monnart

Detailed voting results from Belgium (Final)
R/O	Country	Results			Points
R/O	Country	Jury	Televoting	Combined	Points
01	Lithuania	4		4	
02	Israel	12		12	8
03	France		5	5	1
04	Sweden				
05	Croatia				
06	Portugal	10		10	6
07	Iceland		2	2	
08	Greece		8	8	5
09	Armenia		10	10	7
10	Russia	3		3	
11	Azerbaijan	1	6	7	3
12	Bosnia and Herzegovina				
13	Moldova	8		8	4
14	Malta		4	4	
15	Estonia	2		2	
16	Denmark				
17	Germany	6		6	2
18	Turkey	5	12	17	12
19	Albania		1	1	
20	Norway	7	7	14	10
21	Ukraine				
22	Romania				
23	United Kingdom		3	3	
24	Finland				
25	Spain				
