= Belgium in the Eurovision Song Contest 2005 =

- Eurovision Song Contest 2005
- Participating broadcaster: Radio-télévision belge de la Communauté française (RTBF)
- Country: Belgium
- Selection process: Finale Nationale Concours Eurovision de la Chanson 2005
- Selection date: 20 March 2005

Competing entry
- Song: "Le Grand Soir"
- Artist: Nuno Resende
- Songwriters: Alec Mansion; Frédéric Zeitoun

Placement
- Semi-final result: Failed to qualify (22nd)

Participation chronology

Belgium was represented at the Eurovision Song Contest 2005 with the song "Le Grand Soir", written by Alec Mansion and Frédéric Zeitoun, and performed by Nuno Resende. The Belgian participating broadcaster, Walloon Radio-télévision belge de la Communauté française (RTBF), selected its entry through the national final Finale Nationale Concours Eurovision de la Chanson 2005. In the final on 20 March 2005 which featured two competing entries, "Le Grand Soir" performed by Nuno Resende was selected as the winner after gaining 50.2% of the public televote.

Belgium competed in the semi-final of the Eurovision Song Contest which took place on 19 May 2005. Performing during the show in position 11, "Le Grand Soir" was not announced among the top 10 entries of the semi-final and therefore did not qualify to compete in the final. It was later revealed that Belgium placed twenty-second out of the 25 participating countries in the semi-final with 29 points.

== Background ==
Prior to the 2005 contest, Belgium had participated in the Eurovision Song Contest forty-six times since its debut as one of seven countries to take part in 1956. Since then, the country has won the contest on one occasion in 1986 with the song "J'aime la vie" performed by Sandra Kim. In 2004, "1 Life" performed by Xandee placed twenty-second in the final.

The Belgian participation in the contest alternates between two broadcasters: Flemish Vlaamse Radio- en Televisieomroeporganisatie (VRT) and Walloon Radio-télévision belge de la Communauté française (RTBF) at the time, with both broadcasters sharing the broadcasting rights. Both broadcasters –and their predecessors– had selected the Belgian entry using national finals and internal selections in the past. In 2003, RTBF internally selected both the artist and song, while in 2004, VRT organised the national final Eurosong in order to select the entry. On 20 October 2004, RTBF –who had the turn– confirmed its participation in the 2005 contest and held a national final to select its entry.

== Before Eurovision ==
=== Finale Nationale Concours Eurovision de la Chanson 2005 ===
Finale Nationale Concours Eurovision de la Chanson 2005 was the national final organised by RTBF to select its entry in the Eurovision Song Contest 2005. A submission period was opened for record companies and members of SABAM between 20 October 2004 and 3 January 2005. Songs were required to be performed mainly in French. Following a live audition of five entries shortlisted from 170 received during the submission period, two acts were selected by an eight-member committee for the competition and announced on 10 March 2005. RTBF held the final on 20 March 2005 at its Studio 6 in Brussels, hosted by Jean-Pierre Hautier and Jean-Louis Lahaye and broadcast on La Une as well as via radio on VivaCité. The show simultaneously celebrated the 50th anniversary of the Eurovision Song Contest. The winner, "Le Grand Soir" performed by Nuno Resende, was selected solely by public televoting.

Final – 20 March 2005
R/O	Artist	Song	Songwriter(s)	Televote	Place
1	Nuno Resende	"Le Grand Soir"	Alec Mansion, Frédéric Zeitoun	50.2%	1
2	Tiffany Ciely	"Lost Paradise"	Tiffany Baworowski	49.8%	2

== At Eurovision ==
According to Eurovision rules, all nations with the exceptions of the host country, the "Big Four" (France, Germany, Spain and the United Kingdom) and the ten highest placed finishers in the 2004 contest are required to qualify from the semi-final on 19 May 2005 in order to compete for the final on 21 May 2005; the top ten countries from the semi-final progress to the final. On 22 March 2005, a special allocation draw was held which determined the running order for the semi-final and Belgium was set to perform in position 11, following the entry from Iceland and before the entry from Estonia. At the end of the semi-final, Belgium was not announced among the top 10 entries and therefore failed to qualify to compete in the final. It was later revealed that Belgium placed twenty-second in the semi-final, receiving a total of 29 points.

The semi-final and the final were broadcast in Belgium by both the Flemish and Walloon broadcasters. VRT broadcast the shows on één with commentary in Dutch by André Vermeulen and Anja Daems. RTBF televised the shows on La Une with commentary in French by Jean-Pierre Hautier and Jean-Louis Lahaye. All shows were also broadcast by RTBF on La Première with commentary in French by Patrick Duhamel and Carlo de Pascale, and by VRT on Radio 2 with commentary in Dutch by Julien Put and Michel Follet. RTBF appointed Armelle Gysen as its spokesperson to announce the Belgian votes during the final.

=== Voting ===
Below is a breakdown of points awarded to Belgium and awarded by Belgium in the semi-final and grand final of the contest. The nation awarded its 12 points to the Netherlands in the semi-final and to Greece in the final of the contest.

==== Points awarded to Belgium ====
Points awarded to Belgium (Semi-final)
Score	Country
12 points	Portugal
10 points	
8 points	
7 points	France
6 points	Netherlands
5 points	
4 points	
3 points	Moldova
2 points	
1 point	Albania

==== Points awarded by Belgium ====
Points awarded by Belgium (Semi-final)
Score	Country
12 points	Netherlands
10 points	Portugal
8 points	Romania
7 points	Denmark
6 points	Hungary
5 points	Poland
4 points	Moldova
3 points	Israel
2 points	Norway
1 point	Croatia

Points awarded by Belgium (Final)
Score	Country
12 points	Greece
10 points	Turkey
8 points	Malta
7 points	Romania
6 points	Israel
5 points	Latvia
4 points	Denmark
3 points	Norway
2 points	Hungary
1 point	Moldova
