= Georgia in the Eurovision Song Contest 2007 =

- Eurovision Song Contest 2007
- Participating broadcaster: Georgian Public Broadcaster (GPB)
- Country: Georgia
- Selection process: Artist: Internal selection Song: National final
- Selection date: Artist: 12 December 2006; Song: 3 March 2007

Competing entry
- Song: "Visionary Dream"
- Artist: Sopho
- Songwriters: Beka Japaridze; Bibi Kvachadze

Placement
- Semi-final result: Qualified (8th, 123 points)
- Final result: 12th, 97 points

Participation chronology

Georgia was represented at the Eurovision Song Contest 2007 with the song "Visionary Dream", composed by Beka Jafaridze, with lyrics by Bibi Kvachadze, and performed by Sopho. The Georgian participating broadcaster, the Georgian Public Broadcaster (GPB), selected its entry through a national final, after having previously selected the performer internally. This was the first-ever entry from Georgia in the Eurovision Song Contest.

GPB held an open call for song submissions which resulted in the shortlisting of five entries that were presented to the public during a televised production on 3 March 2007. The results of a public televote exclusively resulted in the selection of "My Story" as the Georgian entry, having received 51% of the votes. The song was later retitled for the Eurovision Song Contest and was titled "Visionary Dream".

Georgia competed in the semi-final of the Eurovision Song Contest which took place on 10 May 2007. Performing during the show in position 6, "Visionary Dream" was announced among the top 10 entries of the semi-final and therefore qualified to compete in the final on 12 May. It was later revealed that Georgia placed eighth out of the 28 participating countries in the semi-final with 123 points. In the final, Georgia performed in position 11 and placed twelfth out of the 24 participating countries, scoring 97 points.

== Background ==
On 27 October 2006, the Georgian national broadcaster, the Georgian Public Broadcaster (GPB), confirmed its intentions to debut at the Eurovision Song Contest in its 2007 edition. GPB would also broadcast the event within Georgia and organise the selection process for its entry. For its 2007 participation, GPB internally selected the artist, while the song was selected through a national final.

== Before Eurovision ==
=== Artist selection ===
On 12 December 2006, GPB held a press conference and announced that it had internally selected Sopho Khalvashi to represent Georgia in Helsinki. The selection of Khalvashi as the Georgian entrant was based on a public poll featuring 20 artists, of which she received 63% of the votes. During the press conference, the broadcaster announced that a national final would be held to select her song.

=== National final ===
GPB opened a public song submission from 12 December 2006 until 25 December 2006. The broadcaster sought songs in the pop-folk genre that were in both English and Georgian. An expert commission selected the top five songs from the received submissions, which were announced and presented to the public on 26 January 2007. The five songs were performed by Sopho Khalvashi via a special programme on 3 March 2007 at the Philharmonic Hall in Tbilisi, hosted by Neli Agirba and Duta Skhirtladze and broadcast on the GPB First Channel as well as online at the broadcaster's website 1tv.ge. The winning song, "My Story", was determined exclusively by a public televote.

Final – 3 March 2007
R/O	Song	Songwriter(s)	Televote	Place
1	"Tell Me Why"	Otar Tatishvili	36%	2
2	"Freedom"	Mikheil Mdinaradze, Tornike Turmanidze	4%	5
3	"My Story"	Beka Jafaridze, Bibi Kvachadze	51%	1
4	"On Adjarian Motives"	Liliko Nemsadze, Gia Jokhadze	5%	3
5	"Fantasy Land"	Zurab Makhniashvili, Giorgi Gogolashvili	4%	4

=== Preparation ===
Sopho recorded the final version of "My Story" at the Livingston Studios in London following the national final. In March 2007, the final version of the song, retitled as "Visionary Dream" and produced by Beka Japaridze and Achiko Guledani, premiered together with the music video which was directed by Kal Karman.

== At Eurovision ==
According to Eurovision rules, all nations with the exceptions of the host country, the "Big Four" (France, Germany, Spain and the United Kingdom) and the ten highest placed finishers in the 2006 contest are required to qualify from the semi-final on 10 May 2007 in order to compete for the final on 12 May 2007. On 12 March 2007, a special allocation draw was held which determined the running order for the semi-final. Georgia was drawn to perform in position 6, following the entry from Iceland and before the entry from Montenegro.

The semi-final and the final were broadcast in Georgia on GBP First Channel with commentary by Sandro Gabisonia and Sopho Altunashvili. GPB appointed Neli Agirba as its spokesperson to announce the Georgian votes during the final.

=== Semi-final ===
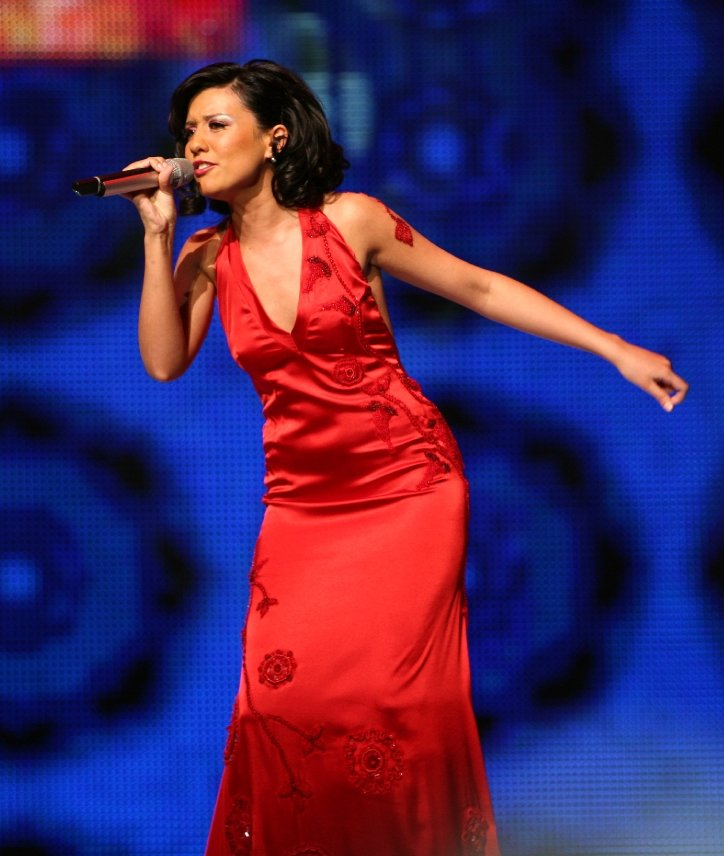
Sopho performing at the Eurovision Song Contest

Sopho took part in technical rehearsals on 3 and 5 May, followed by dress rehearsals on 9 and 10 May. The Georgian performance featured Sopho in a red dress with red symbols on her arm and back. Sopho was joined on stage by four dancers which also performed sword fighting. The stage colours were red and white with the LED screens projecting a myriad of faces and kaleidoscopic images. The performance also featured pyrotechnic effects.

At the end of the show, Georgia was announced as having finished in the top 10 and subsequently qualifying for the grand final. It was later revealed that Georgia placed eighth in the semi-final, receiving a total of 123 points.

=== Final ===
The draw for the running order for the final was done by the presenters during the announcement of the ten qualifying countries during the semi-final and Georgia was drawn to perform in position 11, following the entry from Greece and before the entry from Sweden. Sopho once again took part in dress rehearsals on 11 and 12 May before the final, and performed a repeat of her semi-final performance during the final on 12 May. Georgia placed twelfth in the final, scoring 97 points.

=== Voting ===
Below is a breakdown of points awarded to Georgia and awarded by Georgia in the semi-final and grand final of the contest. The nation awarded its 12 points to Belgium in the semi-final and to Armenia in the final of the contest.

==== Points awarded to Georgia ====
Points awarded to Georgia (Semi-final)
Score	Country
12 points	
10 points	Estonia; Russia; Turkey; Ukraine
8 points	Armenia; Belarus; Israel; Lithuania; Moldova
7 points	Cyprus; Latvia
6 points	Greece
5 points	Netherlands
4 points	Finland; France
3 points	Bulgaria; Poland; Spain
2 points	
1 point	Belgium

Points awarded to Georgia (Final)
Score	Country
12 points	Lithuania
10 points	
8 points	Ukraine
7 points	Finland; Russia
6 points	Belarus; Belgium; Israel; Latvia
5 points	Armenia; Estonia; Poland; Turkey
4 points	Moldova
3 points	Greece
2 points	Croatia; Hungary; Netherlands; Slovenia
1 point	Bosnia and Herzegovina; Cyprus; Czech Republic; Ireland

==== Points awarded by Georgia ====
Points awarded by Georgia (Semi-final)
Score	Country
12 points	Belgium
10 points	Hungary
8 points	Serbia
7 points	Moldova
6 points	Poland
5 points	Latvia
4 points	Belarus
3 points	Bulgaria
2 points	Estonia
1 point	Iceland

Points awarded by Georgia (Final)
Score	Country
12 points	Armenia
10 points	Ukraine
8 points	Belarus
7 points	Russia
6 points	Serbia
5 points	Hungary
4 points	Greece
3 points	Moldova
2 points	Turkey
1 point	Macedonia
