= Sorce =

Sorce is a surname. Notable people with the surname include:

- Freda Wright-Sorce (1955–2005), wife of Don Geronimo
- Nathalie Sorce (born 1979), Belgian singer
