= Jacques Mercier =

Belgian writer and television and radio presenter

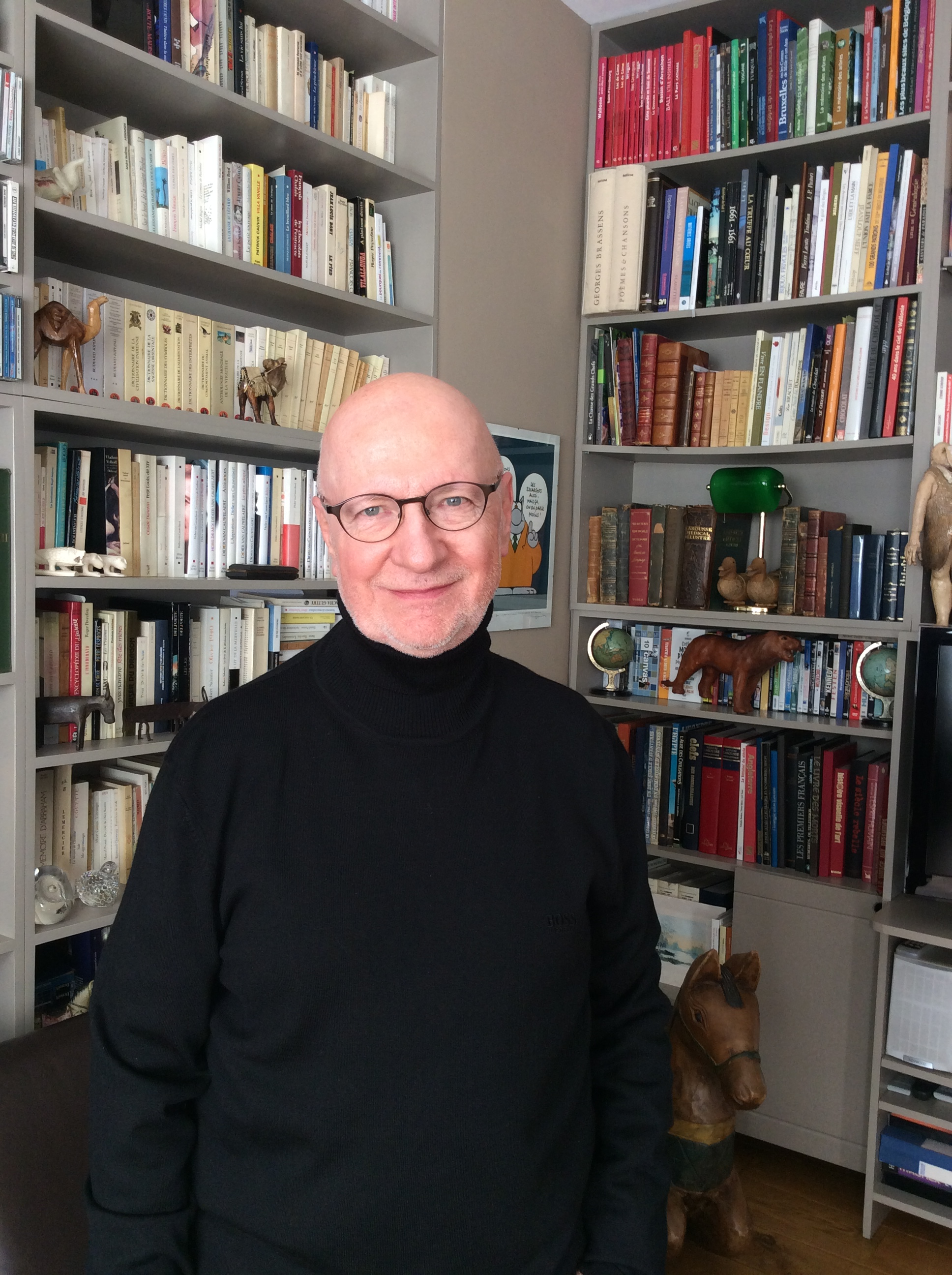
- Born: 17 October 1943 (age 82); Mouscron, Belgium
- Occupations: Writer, television presenter
- Years active: 1963–present

Jacques Mercier (born 17 October 1943 in Mouscron) is a Belgian writer and television and radio presenter.

The third eldest son of René and Denise Mercier, Jacques Mercier was educated at St. Joseph's College. Mercier joined RTBF in September 1963 and started his career by hosting radio shows such as Dimanche musique (with Stéphane Steeman) and Musique au petit déjeuner. He also hosted programmes such as Le Jeu des dictionnaires and La Semaine infernale, and on television, between 1980 until 1986 and again in 1989 he provided the French language commentary for RTBF viewers at the Eurovision Song Contest.

In November 2008, Mercier left the RTBF after 45 years of work.
