= Sven Pichal =

Flemish radio and television producer

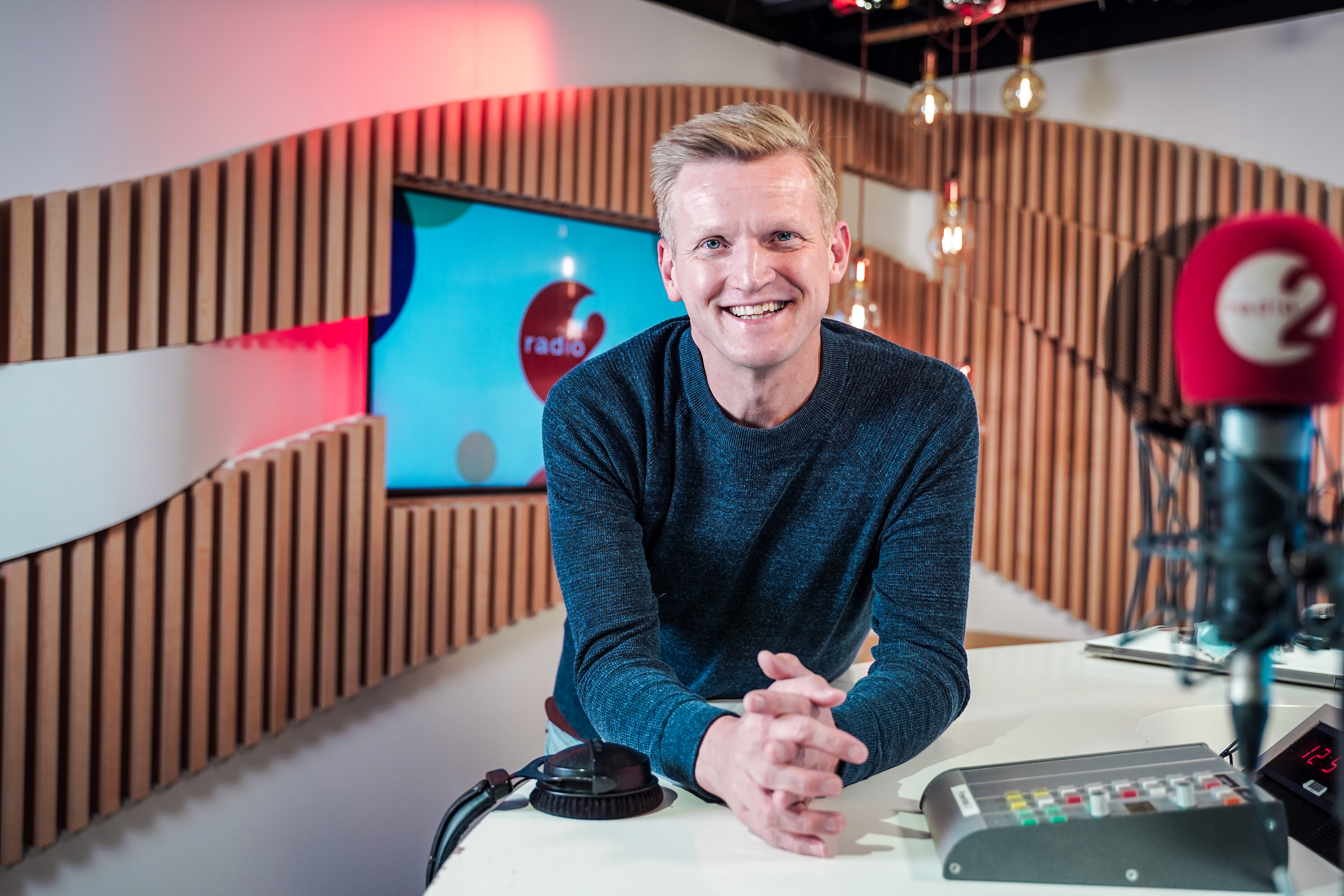
- Sven Pichal, former presenter at Radio 2
- Born: 18 March 1979 (age 47); Wilrijk, Belgium
- Presenting career
- Country: Belgium

Sven Pichal (born 18 March 1979) is a Flemish former radio and television producer for the VRT and convicted pedophile. He presented radio programmes on Radio 1 and Radio 2, and was also a reporter for the television programmes Het Journaal and Volt. In 2023, he left the VRT after an investigation was opened against him for possession and distribution of child pornography.

== Career ==
In 2000, Sven Pichal joined the Flemish Radio and Television Broadcasting Company (VRT), first as editor and reporter for Levende Lijven, De Nieuwe Wereld, Camping Casablanca, Wilde Geruchten, Fris en Co and Naast De Kwestie on Radio 1. He worked with Annemie Peeters for the first time when she presented De Nieuwe Wereld and has considered her his teacher ever since. Pichal presented the Radio 1 programme Peeters & Pichal with Peeters since September 2007. At the end of June 2012, the programme stopped and Pichal went to work behind the scenes at the VRT news service, where, among other things, he helped with TV programmes around the local elections. At the news service, he also became a reporter for Het Journaal and Volt. From September 2014 until 2023, Pichal presented the consumer programme De inspecteur on Radio 2, succeeding Hein Decaluwé, which he combined with reporter work for Volt. From September 2018, he was a presenter of De Markt.

On 26 August 2023, Pichal resigned from VRT for "personal reasons" with immediate effect, having been arrested two days earlier for sex offences. The contested radio maker's programme The Inspector was dropped on Radio 2 and replaced in 2024 by the new consumer programme WinWin fronted by Xavier Taveirne.

In 2026, Pichal appeared in the TV program "Het Bestaat" where he testified about his drug addiction and how he failed to seek help for his pedophile feelings.

== Child sex offences investigation ==
On 24 August 2023 — two days before he resigned from VRT with immediate effect — Pichal and two other men were arrested following a judicial investigation into child sex offences and eventually placed in pre-trial detention. On 22 November, Pichal was placed under house arrest with an ankle bracelet on. From 4 January 2024, he no longer had to wear it with conditions, including attending a treatment programme and a ban on contact with minors. He was also banned from restaurants and the internet and banned from using drugs or alcohol. All three arrested are suspected of possessing and distributing images of child abuse via WhatsApp messages. One of the other two suspects — who the Antwerp prosecutor's office says is the pivotal figure in the vice investigation — is also further prosecuted for sexual assault and rape of minors. On 16 December 2024, the Antwerp Correctional Court sentenced Pichal to a three-year suspended prison term and fined him €8,000.

An investigation was also launched into drug offences, as a small quantity of cocaine was found among Pichal's personal belongings during the vice investigation and he was found to be ordering designer drugs at his work address at VRT. These charges were suspended by the chambers.

== Presented programmes ==
- Naast De Kwestie (2006)
- Dienst Amusement (2007)
- Fris en Co (2007)
- Peeters & Pichal (2007–2012)
- De inspecteur (2014–2023)
