= Anja Daems =

Belgian radio presenter and television host

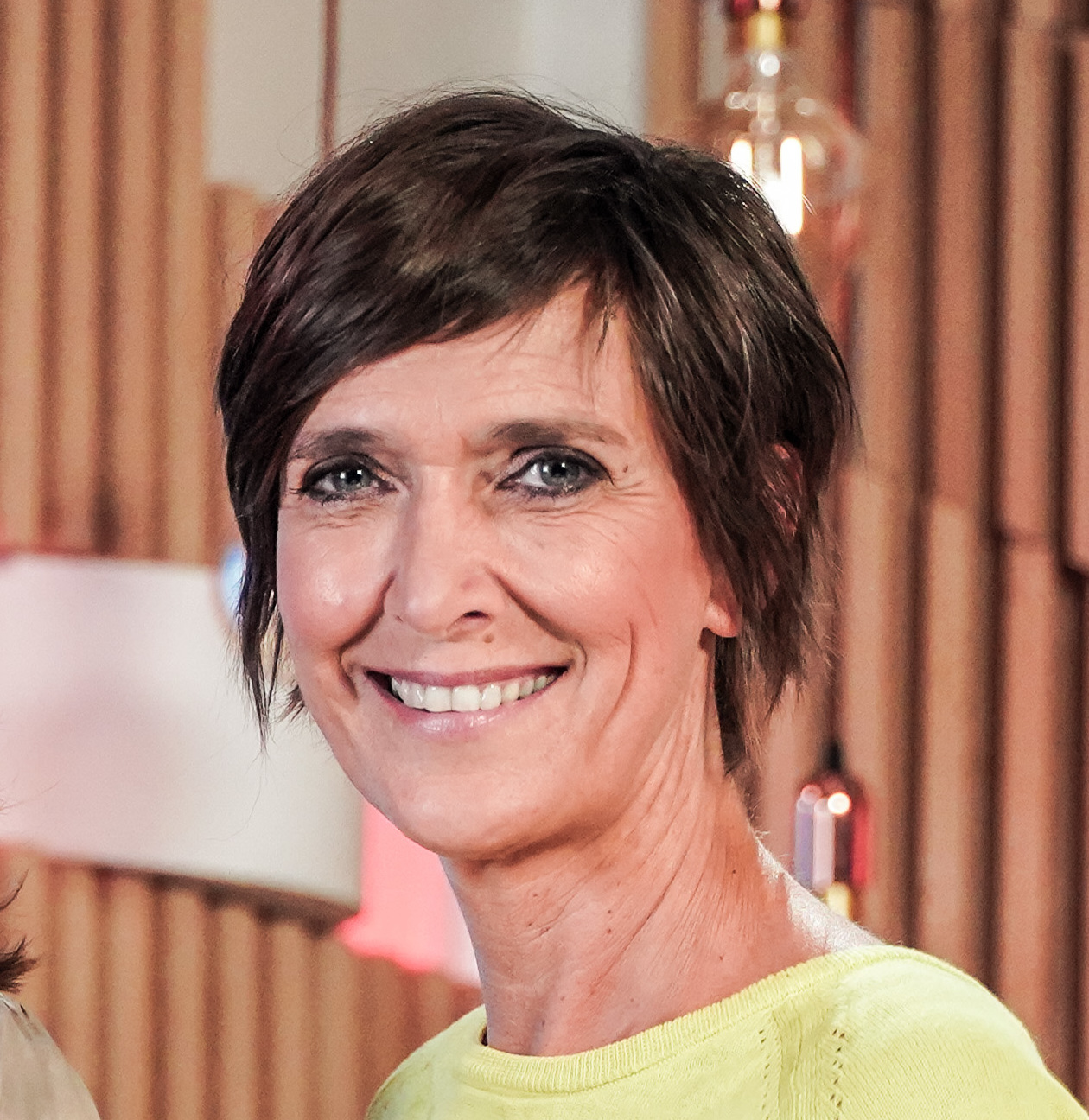
- Born: 26 May 1968 (age 58); Geel, Belgium
- Presenting career
- Show: De Madammen
- Station: Radio 2

Anja Daems (born 26 May 1968) is a Belgian radio presenter and television host.

== Biography ==
Daems spent her childhood in Geel. She studied at the Conservatory in Antwerp. During her last year of study she started working as a reporter at Radio 2. Later she presented on Radio 2, among others, Schijfje citroen and Soes. For several years she was the presenter at the television channel Eén of, among others, programs Open op zondag, Herexamen and De Notenclub. In 1999 she briefly said goodbye to radio. Since 2007 she has been presenting De Madammen on Radio 2 with Cathérine Vandoorne and Siska Schoeters (formerly Britt Van Marsenille, Leki and Ilse Van Hoecke), which also airs on Eén. After the outbreak of the COVID-19 pandemic she presented Beste beuren, reporting stories of solidarity from allover the country during the difficult times of the pandemic.

Daems developed a strong friendship with Catherine Vandoorne, her close friend since the 1980s, with whom she also worked at De Madammen. In November 2008 she gave birth to a daughter, Anna Julia.
