= Jean-Pierre Hautier =

Belgian television presenter and broadcaster

- Born: 18 October 1955; Brussels, Belgium
- Died: 12 October 2012 (aged 56); Brussels, Belgium
- Occupations: broadcaster, television presenter
- Spouse: Fabienne Vande Meersche
- Children: 2 daughters

Jean-Pierre Hautier (18 October 1955 – 12 October 2012) was a Belgian television presenter and broadcaster for RTBF.

Hautier was known for his long-time commentary for RTBF viewers on the Eurovision Song Contest which he had done since the 1994 Contest after the regular commentator Claude Delacroix got promoted to the head of Belgian radio. In addition Hautier had co-commentated the event with Sandra Kim at the 1996 Contest and was until his death hosting the contest with Jean-Louis Lahaye which he had done since the 2007 Contest.

He was the president of La Première Radio.
