= André Vermeulen =

- Born: André Leopold Adiel Vermeulen; 25 October 1955 (age 70); Bruges, Belgium
- Occupations: Journalist, television presenter
- Years active: 1984–present

André Leopold Adiel Vermeulen (born 25 October 1955 in Bruges) is a Belgian-Flemish journalist and television personality for VRT.

Between 1991 and 2013, Vermeulen following Luc Appermont had been the Flemish commentator for the Eurovision Song Contest. Due to unknown reasons in 1996, Vermeulen was unable to commentate on the 1996 Contest with Michel Follet and Johan Verstreken filling in, however returning to commentate on the 1997 Contest, since the 1998 Contest Vermeulen has co-commentated the event with other television presenters including Bart Peeters and Tom De Cock. Vermeulen had also commentated for VRT viewers at the 2005 Junior Eurovision Song Contest.

Vermeulen commentated for the final time at the 2013 Contest, he did not return to commentate in 2014 with MNM presenters Peter Van de Veire and Eva Daeleman taking over. However he continues to cover the contest for Het Journaal and the EurosongBe, The Belgian Eurovision website.

Currently he is a reporter on Het Journaal in which he reports on current affairs, show business and monarchy. He speaks Dutch, French, English, Spanish and Italian.
