= Macedonia in the Eurovision Song Contest 2007 =

- Eurovision Song Contest 2007
- Participating broadcaster: Macedonian Radio Television (MRT)
- Country: Macedonia
- Selection process: Pesna za Evrovizija 2007
- Selection date: 24 February 2007

Competing entry
- Song: "Mojot svet"
- Artist: Karolina Gočeva
- Songwriters: Grigor Koprov; Ognen Nedelkovski

Placement
- Semi-final result: Qualified (9th, 97 points)
- Final result: 14th, 73 points

Participation chronology

Macedonia (Note: Officially under the provisional appellation "former Yugoslav Republic of Macedonia", abbreviated "FYR Macedonia".) was represented at the Eurovision Song Contest 2007 with the song "Mojot svet" (Мојот свет), written by Grigor Koprov and Ognen Nedelkovski, and performed by Karolina Gočeva. The Macedonian participating broadcaster, Macedonian Radio Television (MRT), organised the national final Pesna za Evrovizija 2007 in order to select its entry for the contest. Fifteen entries competed in the national selection on 24 February 2007 where "Mojot svet" performed by Karolina Gočeva was selected by a regional televote. Gočeva had previously represented Macedonia in 2002 with the song "Od nas zavisi", placing nineteenth.

Macedonia competed in the semi-final of the Eurovision Song Contest which took place on 10 May 2007. Performing during the show in position 18, "Mojot svet" was announced among the top 10 entries of the semi-final and therefore qualified to compete in the final on 12 May. It was later revealed that Macedonia placed ninth out of the 28 participating countries in the semi-final with 97 points. In the final, Macedonia performed in position 6 and placed fourteenth out of the 24 participating countries, scoring 73 points.

== Background ==
Prior to the 2007 contest, Macedonian Radio Television (MRT) had participated in the Eurovision Song Contest representing Macedonia six times since its first entry in 1998. Its best result in the contest to this point was twelfth, achieved in 2006 with the song "Ninanajna" performed by Elena Risteska. Following the introduction of semi-finals for the 2004, Macedonia had featured in every final.

As part of its duties as participating broadcaster, MRT organises the selection of its entry in the Eurovision Song Contest and broadcasts the event in the country. The broadcaster had previously selected its entry for the contest through both national finals and internal selections. MRT confirmed its intentions to participate at the 2007 contest on 9 November 2006. Since 1996, MRT selected its entries using a national final, a procedure that continued for its 2007 entry.

== Before Eurovision ==
=== Pesna za Evrovizija 2007 ===
Pesna za Evrovizija 2007 was the national final organised by MRT that selected its entry for the Eurovision Song Contest 2007. Fifteen entries participated in the competition which took place on 24 February 2007 at the Universal Hall in Skopje, hosted by Milanka Rašić, Živkica Gjurčinovska and Igor Džambazov and was broadcast on MTV 1 and MTV Sat.

==== Competing entries ====
A submission period was opened for interested artists and composers to submit their songs between 20 November 2006 and 20 December 2006. MRT received 150 submissions at the closing of the deadline. Twelve entries were selected from the open submissions, while an additional three entries were wildcards submitted by well-known artists directly invited by MRT for the competition. The twelve selected songs from the open submissions were announced on 6 January 2007, while their artists were announced on 24 January 2007 along with the three wildcard entries. Among the competing artists was Karolina Gočeva who represented Macedonia in 2002. Among the competing composers, Elena Risteska represented Macedonia in 2006.

Artist	Song	Songwriter(s)
Andrijana Janevska	"Epizoda" (Епизода)	Aleksandar Stefanovski-Jablan
Biba Dodeva	"Čuvaj me" (Чувај ме)	Vladimir Dojčinovski, Biba Dodeva
Deana Nikolovska	"Nebo" (Небо)	Vladimir Dojčinovski, Risto Samardžiev
Elena Petreska	"Peam" (Пеам)	Grigor Koprov, Vesna Malinova
Gjorgji Krstevski	"Letni doždovi" (Летни дождови)	Gjorgji Krstevski
Ivana Andonova	"Odi si" (Оди си)	Ivana Andonovska, Vesna Malinova
Karolina Gočeva	"Mojot svet" (Мојот свет)	Grigor Koprov, Ognen Nedelkovski
Lambe Alabakoski	"Belo e se" (Бело е се)	Robert Bilbilov, Elena Risteska
Maja Grozdanovska Pančeva	"Kavijar i svila" (Кавијар и свила)	Blaže Temelkov
Maja Sazdanovska and Jovan Jovanov	"1, 2, 3"	Jovan Jovanov, Maja Sazdanovska, Elvir Mekić
Marijan Stojanovski	"Ako te rasplačat" (Ако те расплачат)	Vančo Dimitrov
Sanja Lefkova	"Otrov i lek" (Отров и лек)	Jovan Jovanov, Elvir Mekić
Super Nova	"Potseti me" (Потсети ми)	Damjan Lazarov, Elvir Mekić
Tamara Todevska	"Kaži koj si ti" (Кажи кој си ти)	Aleksandar Masevski
Vasil Garvanliev	"Pomogni mi" (Помогни ми)	Vasil Garvanliev

==== Final ====
The final took place on 24 February 2007. All fifteen competing entries were accompanied by the MRT orchestra, conducted by Kire Kostov, and regional televoting selected "Mojot svet" performed by Karolina Gočeva as the winner. In addition to the performances of the competing entries, the competition featured guest performances by Boris Novković (who represented Croatia in 2005), Elena Risteska (who represented Macedonia in 2006), and Dmitry Koldun (who would represent Belarus in 2007).

Final – 24 February 2007
R/O	Artist	Song	Points	Place
1	Maja Sazdanovska and Jovan Jovanov	"1, 2, 3"	71	4
2	Elena Petreska	"Peam"	67	5
3	Maja Grozdanovska Pančeva	"Kavijar i svila"	6	15
4	Marijan Stojanovski	"Ako te rasplačat"	20	10
5	Deana Nikolovska	"Nebo"	11	14
6	Andrijana Janevska	"Epizoda"	19	11
7	Vasil Garvanliev	"Pomogni mi"	15	13
8	Gjorgji Krstevski	"Letni doždovi"	30	7
9	Lambe Alabakoski	"Belo e se"	101	3
10	Biba Dodeva	"Čuvaj me"	21	9
11	Ivana Andonova	"Odi si"	16	12
12	Karolina Gočeva	"Mojot svet"	144	1
13	Super Nova	"Potseti me"	30	7
14	Tamara Todevska	"Kaži koj si ti"	105	2
15	Sanja Lefkova	"Otrov i lek"	40	6

Detailed Regional Televoting Results
R/O	Song	Bitola	Veles	Gostivar	Kočani	Kičevo	Kumanovo	Ohrid	Prilep	Skopje	Strumica	Tetovo	Štip	Total
1	"1, 2, 3"	7	6	7	6	6	5	5	5	7	6	5	6	71
2	"Peam"	6	7	4	5	7	3	7	8	5	3	7	5	67
3	"Kavijar i svila"									6				6
4	"Ako te rasplačat"	5	2		3	3	1		6					20
5	"Nebo"				1	1	6			2			1	11
6	"Epizoda"		3	3				1	1		1	6	4	19
7	"Pomogni mi"	3									10	2		15
8	"Letni doždovi"	2	4	5	4	5		3		1		3	3	30
9	"Belo e se"	10	10	8	8	8	8	8	7	8	8	10	8	101
10	"Čuvaj me"		1	1	2		4		2	4	5		2	21
11	"Odi si"	1					10	4				1		16
12	"Mojot svet"	12	12	12	12	12	12	12	12	12	12	12	12	144
13	"Potseti me"	4		6		2		6	3	3	2	4		30
14	"Kaži koj si ti"	8	8	10	7	10	7	10	10	10	7	8	10	105
15	"Otrov i lek"		5	2	10	4	2	2	4		4		7	40

=== Preparation ===
On 25 March, Karolina filmed the official music video for "Mojot svet". The music video, directed by the production company Tomato Production, was released on 3 April along with the English version of the song. MRT originally intended for "Mojot svet" to be performed solely in Macedonian at the Eurovision Song Contest, but it was later decided together with Karolina that the song would be performed in a mixture of English and Macedonian at the contest.

=== Promotion ===
Karolina made several appearances across Europe to specifically promote "Mojot svet" as the Macedonian Eurovision entry. On 5 March, Karolina performed "Mojot svet" during the presentation show of the Bosnian-Herzegovinian entry, BH Eurosong Show 2007. Karolina also performed the song during the final of the Serbian national final, Beovizija 2007, on 8 March. In addition to her international appearances, on 26 April, Karolina held a pre-contest concert at the Metropolis Arena in Skopje.

== At Eurovision ==
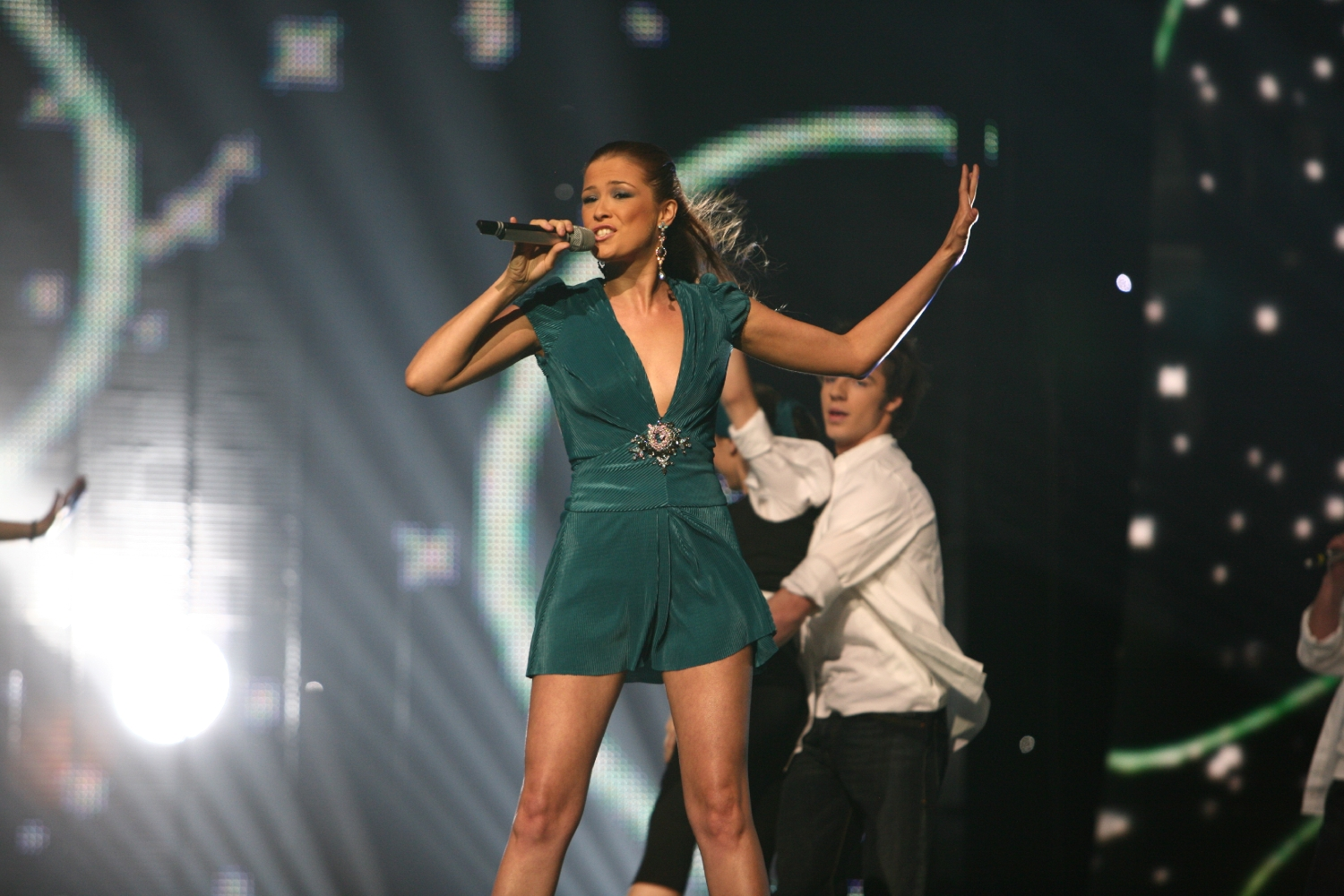
Karolina performing at the Eurovision Song Contest

According to Eurovision rules, all nations with the exceptions of the host country, the "Big Four" (France, Germany, Spain and the United Kingdom) and the ten highest placed finishers in the 2006 contest are required to qualify from the semi-final on 10 May 2007 in order to compete for the final on 12 May 2007. On 12 March 2007, a special allocation draw was held which determined the running order for the semi-final and Macedonia was set to perform in position 18, following the entry from Portugal and before the entry from Norway.

The semi-final and final were broadcast in Macedonia on MTV 1 and MTV Sat with commentary by Milanka Rašić. MRT appointed Elena Risteska, who represented Macedonia in 2006, as its spokesperson to announce the Macedonian votes during the final.

=== Semi-final ===
Karolina took part in technical rehearsals on 4 and 6 May, followed by dress rehearsals on 9 and 10 May. The Macedonian performance featured Karolina performing in a short green dress together with a ballerina, a dancer and three backing vocalists which began the song seated on chairs. The background LED screens displayed a starry sky and the performance also featured the use of a wind machine and pyrotechnics. The five backing performers that joined Karolina on stage were Ana Kostova Kostadinovska, Andrijana Janevska, Boban Kovačevski, Sara Projkovska Nikolovska and Stevo Cjepinovski.

At the end of the show, Macedonia was announced as having finished in the top ten and subsequently qualifying for the grand final. It was later revealed that Macedonia placed ninth in the semi-final, receiving a total of 97 points.

=== Final ===
The draw for the running order for the final was done by the presenters during the announcement of the ten qualifying countries during the semi-final and Macedonia was drawn to perform in position 6, following the entry from Finland and before the entry from Slovenia. Karolina once again took part in dress rehearsals on 11 and 12 May before the final and performed a repeat of her semi-final performance during the final on 12 May. Macedonia placed fourteenth in the final, scoring 73 points.

=== Voting ===
Below is a breakdown of points awarded to Macedonia and awarded by Macedonia in the semi-final and grand final of the contest. The nation awarded its 12 points to Serbia in the semi-final and the final of the contest.

==== Points awarded to Macedonia ====
Points awarded to Macedonia (Semi-final)
Score	Country
12 points	Bulgaria
10 points	Albania; Montenegro; Serbia; Slovenia
8 points	Croatia
7 points	Bosnia and Herzegovina
6 points	Czech Republic; Switzerland; Turkey
5 points	Austria; Sweden
4 points	
3 points	
2 points	Romania
1 point	

Points awarded to Macedonia (Final)
Score	Country
12 points	
10 points	Bulgaria; Montenegro; Serbia; Slovenia
8 points	Bosnia and Herzegovina; Croatia
7 points	
6 points	Switzerland
5 points	Czech Republic
4 points	
3 points	Albania
2 points	
1 point	Austria; Georgia; Turkey

==== Points awarded by Macedonia ====
Points awarded by Macedonia (Semi-final)
Score	Country
12 points	Serbia
10 points	Albania
8 points	Turkey
7 points	Bulgaria
6 points	Croatia
5 points	Slovenia
4 points	Belarus
3 points	Montenegro
2 points	Poland
1 point	Andorra

Points awarded by Macedonia (Final)
Score	Country
12 points	Serbia
10 points	Turkey
8 points	Bulgaria
7 points	Belarus
6 points	Slovenia
5 points	Russia
4 points	Bosnia and Herzegovina
3 points	Greece
2 points	Ukraine
1 point	Moldova
