= Hungary in the Eurovision Song Contest 2007 =

- Eurovision Song Contest 2007
- Participating broadcaster: Magyar Televízió (MTV)
- Country: Hungary
- Selection process: Artist: Fonogram Hungarian Music Awards 2007; Song: Internal selection
- Selection date: Artist: 24 February 2007; Song: 12 March 2007

Competing entry
- Song: "Unsubstantial Blues"
- Artist: Magdi Rúzsa
- Songwriters: Magdi Rúzsa; Imre Mózsik

Placement
- Semi-final result: Qualified (2nd, 224 points)
- Final result: 9th, 128 points

Participation chronology

Hungary was represented at the Eurovision Song Contest 2007 with the song "Unsubstantial Blues", composed by Magdi Rúzsa, with lyrics by Imre Mózsik, and performed by Rúzsa herself. The Hungarian participating broadcaster, Magyar Televízió (MTV), internally selected its entry, after having previously selected the performer through the "Discovery of the Year" category of the Fonogram Hungarian Music Awards 2007. In December 2006, MTV announced that it would be returning to the contest after a one-year absence following its withdrawal in 2006 due to financial reasons. Six artists competed in the "Discovery of the Year" category of the awards and Magdi Rúzsa was selected as the winner based entirely on a public televote. MTV internally selected the song, "Unsubstantial Blues", that was presented on 12 March 2007.

Hungary competed in the semi-final of the Eurovision Song Contest which took place on 10 May 2007. Performing during the show in position 22, "Unsubstantial Blues" was announced among the top 10 entries of the semi-final and therefore qualified to compete in the final on 12 May. It was later revealed that Hungary placed second out of the 28 participating countries in the semi-final with 224 points. In the final, Hungary performed in position 8 and placed ninth out of the 24 participating countries, scoring 128 points.

== Background ==
Prior to the 2007 contest, Magyar Televízió (MTV) had participated in the Eurovision Song Contest representing Hungary five times since its first entry in 1994. Its best placing in the contest was fourth, achieved with its début entry in 1994 with the song "Kinek mondjam el vétkeimet?" performed by Friderika Bayer. MTV had attempted to participate in the contest in 1993, however, its entry was eliminated in the preselection show Kvalifikacija za Millstreet. The broadcaster withdrew from the contest for six years between 1999 and 2004 and also missed the 2006 contest. In 2005, the song "Forogj, világ!" performed by Nox placed twelfth.

As part of its duties as participating broadcaster, MTV organises the selection of its entry in the Eurovision Song Contest and broadcasts the event in the country. The broadcaster confirmed its intentions to participate at the 2007 contest on 15 December 2006. MTV has organised both internal selections and national selection shows to select its entries. For 2007, the broadcaster opted to utilize the Fonogram Hungarian Music Awards to select the artist and organize an internal selection to select the song.

== Before Eurovision ==
=== Fonogram Hungarian Music Awards 2007 ===
MTV selected the Hungarian entrant for the Eurovision Song Contest 2007 through the "Discovery of the Year" category of the 2007 Fonogram Hungarian Music Awards (Hungarian: Fonogram – Magyar Zenei Díj). A 209-member preselection jury nominated six artists for the category based on their record sales in 2006 and the public was able to vote for their favourite artist by submitting an SMS between 10 and 24 February 2007. The winner, Magdi Rúzsa, was selected via the public vote and announced during the awards show which took place on 24 February at the Jövő Háza Theater in Budapest and broadcast on m1 as well as online at mtv.hu. Guest performers of the show were Back II Black, Magna Cum Laude, Quimby, Adrien Szekeres and Laci Gáspár, Moby Dick, Sugarloaf, Erős and Spigiboy, Desperado, Ghymes, Tamás Mester, Cotton Club Singers, Tankcsapda and Charlie (who represented Hungary in 1998).

Magdi Rúzsa's win caused controversy in Hungary, as the singer was born and raised in the Serbian province of Vojvodina, leading people to question why a "Serb" was representing the country rather than a Hungarian and speculation that the reason Rúzsa was crying upon receiving her award was due to the crowd heckling her beforehand.

Discovery of the Year category results – 24 February 2007
Artist	Label	Televote	Place
Angéla Póka	Sony BMG	—	—
Eszter Bartók	Tom-Tom Records	—	—
Eszter Szabó	EMI	—	—
Magdi Rúzsa	Universal Music/CLS Records	31,075	1
Wendigo	Nail/Hammer	31,057	2
Wisdom	Nail/Hammer	—	—

=== Song selection ===
On 12 March, it was announced that Magdi Rúzsa would perform the song "Unsubstantial Blues" at the Eurovision Song Contest. "Unsubstantial Blues" was written by Rúzsa herself and Imre Mózsik, and appeared on her debut album Ördögi angyal released in November 2006 under its Hungarian version titled "Aprócska blues". Controversy later arose that Rúzsa had sung a verse of "Aprócska blues" as part of her audition for the reality television singing competition Megasztár in February 2006, thus violating the Eurovision Song Contest rules stating that "the entries (lyrics and music) must not have been commercially released and/or publicly performed before 1 October 2006". In the end the song was allowed to remain in the competition.

== At Eurovision ==
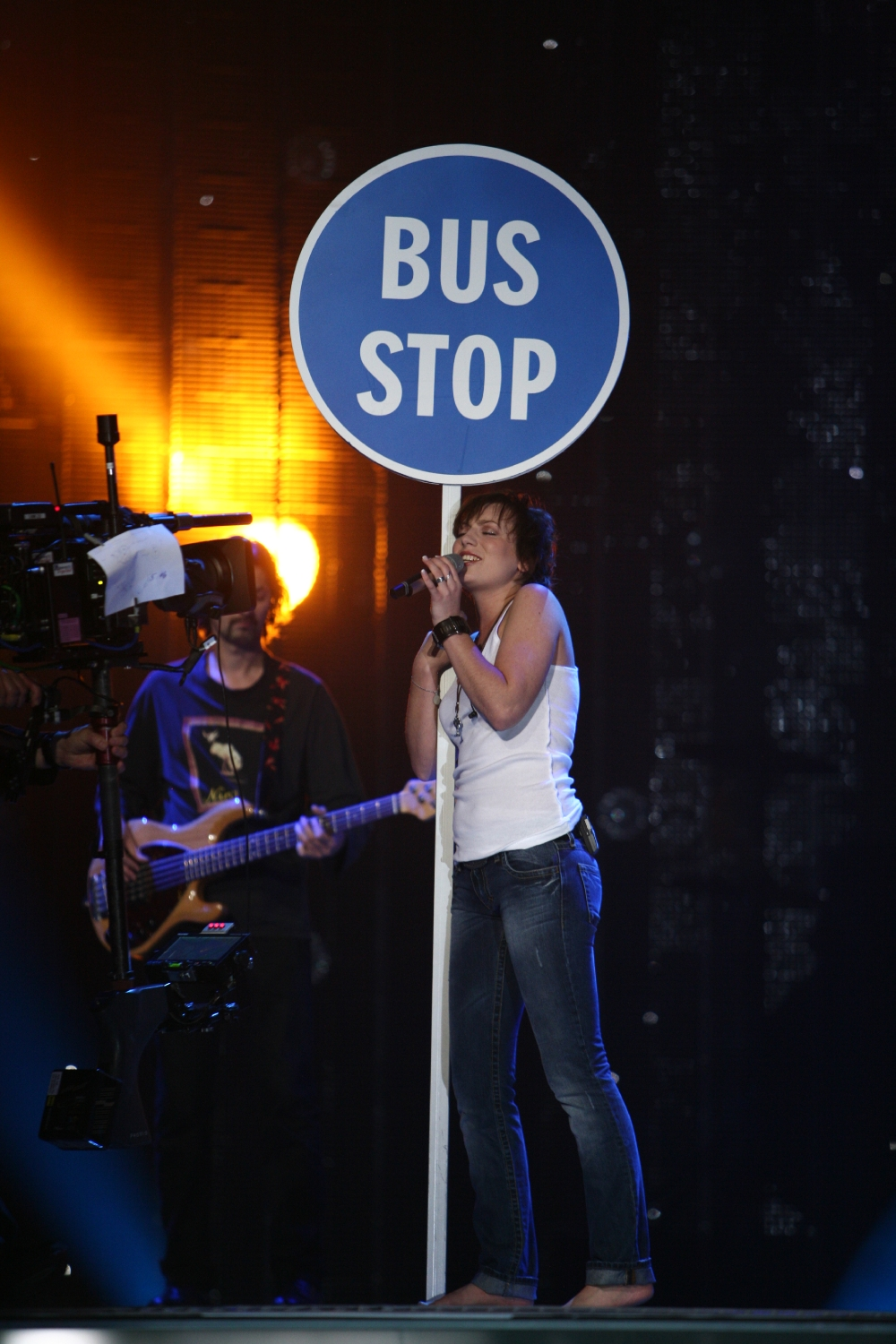
Magdi Rúzsa performing at Eurovision

According to Eurovision rules, all nations with the exceptions of the host country, the "Big Four" (France, Germany, Spain and the United Kingdom) and the ten highest placed finishers in the 2006 contest are required to qualify from the semi-final on 10 May 2007 in order to compete for the final on 12 May 2007. On 12 March 2007, an allocation draw was held which determined the running order for the semi-final and Hungary was set to perform in position 22, following the entry from Andorra and before the entry from Estonia.

The semi-final and the final were broadcast in Hungary on m1 with commentary by Gábor Gundel Takács. MTV appointed Éva Novodomszky as its spokesperson to announce Hungarian votes during the final.

=== Semi-final ===
Magdi Rúzsa took part in technical rehearsals on 4 and 6 May, followed by dress rehearsals on 9 and 10 May. The Hungarian performance featured Magdi Rúzsa dressed in a white tank top and blue jeans with the stage displaying a bus stop sign where she stood with a suitcase and the LED screens projecting orange designs. On stage, Magdi Rúzsa was joined by two guitarists, a drummer and a pianist: Péter Hoffer, Barnabás Kovács, Gábor Madarász and Gábor Závodi.

At the end of the show, Hungary was announced as having finished in the top ten and subsequently qualifying for the grand final. It was later revealed that the Hungary placed second in the semi-final, receiving a total of 224 points.

=== Final ===
The draw for the running order for the final was done by the presenters during the announcement of the ten qualifying countries during the semi-final and Hungary was drawn to perform in position 8, following the entry from Slovenia and before the entry from Lithuania. Magdi Rúzsa once again took part in dress rehearsals on 11 and 12 May before the final and performed a repeat of her semi-final performance during the final on 12 May. Hungary placed ninth in the final, scoring 128 points.

=== Voting ===
Below is a breakdown of points awarded to Hungary and awarded by Hungary in the semi-final and grand final of the contest. The nation awarded its 12 points to Serbia in the semi-final and the final of the contest.

==== Points awarded to Hungary ====
Points awarded to Hungary (Semi-final)
Score	Country
12 points	Denmark; Iceland; Serbia
10 points	Finland; Georgia; Norway; Portugal; Romania
8 points	Austria; Czech Republic; Estonia; Latvia; Netherlands; Poland; Sweden
7 points	Belgium; Croatia; Ireland; Lithuania
6 points	Germany; Slovenia
5 points	Albania
4 points	Andorra; Bulgaria; Cyprus; Malta; Switzerland; Ukraine; United Kingdom
3 points	Russia
2 points	France
1 point	Belarus; Bosnia and Herzegovina; Spain; Turkey

Points awarded to Hungary (Final)
Score	Country
12 points	Serbia
10 points	Finland
8 points	Denmark; Iceland; Norway; Romania; Sweden
7 points	Germany
6 points	Andorra
5 points	Belgium; Georgia; Ireland; Latvia; Slovenia
4 points	Croatia; Estonia; Lithuania; Netherlands
3 points	Switzerland
2 points	Austria; Poland; Portugal; United Kingdom
1 point	Malta

==== Points awarded by Hungary ====
Points awarded by Hungary (Semi-final)
Score	Country
12 points	Serbia
10 points	Iceland
8 points	Bulgaria
7 points	Slovenia
6 points	Turkey
5 points	Netherlands
4 points	Latvia
3 points	Poland
2 points	Belarus
1 point	Norway

Points awarded by Hungary (Final)
Score	Country
12 points	Serbia
10 points	Bulgaria
8 points	Romania
7 points	Greece
6 points	Russia
5 points	Moldova
4 points	Belarus
3 points	Ukraine
2 points	Georgia
1 point	Turkey
