= Slovenia in the Eurovision Song Contest 2007 =

- Eurovision Song Contest 2007
- Participating broadcaster: Radiotelevizija Slovenija (RTVSLO)
- Country: Slovenia
- Selection process: Evrovizijska Melodija 2007
- Selection date: 3 February 2007

Competing entry
- Song: "Cvet z juga"
- Artist: Alenka Gotar
- Songwriters: Andrej Babić

Placement
- Semi-final result: Qualified (7th, 140 points)
- Final result: 15th, 66 points

Participation chronology

Slovenia was represented at the Eurovision Song Contest 2007 with the song "Cvet z juga", written by Andrej Babić, and performed by Alenka Gotar. The Slovene participating broadcaster, Radiotelevizija Slovenija (RTVSLO), organised the national final Evrovizijska Melodija 2007 (EMA 2007) in order to select its entry for the contest. 24 entries competed in the national final which consisted of three shows: two semi-finals and a final. The top seven entries were selected to advance from each semi-final based on a public televote. Fourteen entries qualified to compete in the final where the winner was selected over two rounds of public televoting. In the first round, the top two entries were selected. In the second round, "Cvet z juga" performed by Alenka Gotar was selected as the winner entirely by a public televote.

Slovenia competed in the semi-final of the Eurovision Song Contest which took place on 10 May 2007. Performing during the show in position 25, "Cvet z juga" was announced among the top 10 entries of the semi-final and therefore qualified to compete in the final on 12 May. This marked the first time that Slovenia qualified to the final of the Eurovision Song Contest from a semi-final since the introduction of semi-finals in 2004. It was later revealed that Slovenia placed seventh out of the 28 participating countries in the semi-final with 140 points. In the final, Slovenia performed in position 7 and placed fifteenth out of the 24 participating countries, scoring 66 points.

== Background ==
Prior to the 2007 contest, Radiotelevizija Slovenija (RTVSLO) had participated in the Eurovision Song Contest representing Slovenia twelve times since its first entry in 1993. Its highest placing in the contest, to this point, has been seventh place, achieved on two occasions: in 1995 with the song "Prisluhni mi" performed by Darja Švajger, and in 2001 with the song "Energy" performed by Nuša Derenda. Its only other top ten result was achieved in 1997 when "Zbudi se" by Tanja Ribič placed tenth. Since the introduction of semi-finals to the format of the contest in 2004, Slovenia had yet to manage to qualify to the final on one occasion. In 2006, "Mr Nobody" performed by Anžej Dežan failed to qualify to the final.

As part of its duties as participating broadcaster, RTVSLO organises the selection of its entry in the Eurovision Song Contest and broadcasts the event in the country. The broadcaster confirmed its participation in the 2007 contest on 27 October 2006. The broadcaster has traditionally selected its entry through a national final entitled Evrovizijska Melodija (EMA), which has been produced with variable formats. For 2007, the broadcaster opted to organise EMA 2007 to select its entry.

== Before Eurovision ==
=== EMA 2007 ===
EMA 2007 was the 12th edition of the Slovenian national final format Evrovizijska Melodija (EMA). The competition was used by RTVSLO to select its entry for the Eurovision Song Contest 2007, and consisted of three shows that commenced on 1 February 2007 and concluded on 3 February 2007. All shows in the competition took place at the Gospodarsko razstavišče in Ljubljana and were broadcast on TV SLO 1 and online via the broadcaster's website rtvslo.si. The final was also broadcast on Radio Val 202.

==== Format ====
The format of the competition consisted of three televised shows: two semi-finals held on 1 and 2 February 2007 and a final held on 3 February 2007. Twelve songs competed in each semi-final and public televoting exclusively determined seven finalists to proceed to the final. Fourteen songs competed in the final where the winner was selected over two rounds of public televoting. In the first round, two songs were selected out of the sixteen competing songs to proceed to a superfinal, during which the winner was determined.

==== Competing entries ====
Artists and composers were able to submit their entries to the broadcaster between 27 October 2006 and 3 December 2006. 90 entries were received by the broadcaster during the submission period. An expert committee consisting of Miša Čermak (lyricist), Alenka Godec (singer), Vojko Sfiligoj (musician and composer) and Patrik Greblo (conductor and composer) selected twenty-three artists and songs for the competition from the received submissions, while an additional entry was provided by Eva Černe who won the third season of the talent show Bitka Talentov. The competing artists were announced on 12 December 2006.

Artist	Song	Songwriter(s)
Alenka Gotar	"Cvet z juga"	Andrej Babić
Alya	"Vizija"	Žare Pak, Peter Dekleva, Flex, Cvetka Omladič
Bojana Glatz	"Vse se isto zdi"	Bojana Glatz, Aleš Čadež
Brigitt Rose and Wladimir	"Prižgi vecni plamen / Light Eternal Flame"	Brigita Lupša
Dean Vivod and Tonus Kitaris	"Hitmejker"	Franci Zabukovec, Dean Vivod
Denis	"Nor sem nate"	Zvone Tomac, Denis Vučak
Diona Dimm	"Oče"	Bojan Simončič, Ana Soklič, Gašper Kačar
Don Corleone	"Bella mia"	Egon Herman, Jernej Dirnbek
Eva Černe	"Čudeži smehljaja"	Boštjan Grabnar, Damjana Kenda-Hussu
Eva Moškon and Črnobelo	"Ljubim se"	Klemen Teran
Folklora	"19XX"	Samo Javornik
Jernej Dermota	"Moj planet"	Frenk Nova, Urša Mravlje Fajon
Lunapark	"Slike"	Mark Lemer, Apolonija Šterk
Martin Perović	"Zadeni me"	Simon Gomilšek, Diana Lečnik
Nude	"Element ^{104}L_{(258)}"	Teodor Amanovič, Gaber Marolt
Panda	"Nemirna leta"	Andrej Pompe
Rok Kosmač	"Ko še spiš"	Rok Kosmač
Sebastian	"Naj svet zakriči!"	Boštjan Grabnar, Sebastijan Podgornik
Steffy and Donald Trumpet	"Zadel si me v živo"	Marino Legovič, Damjana Kenda-Hussu
Tadeja Fatur	"Drugačna (pesem)"	Bor Zuljan, Leon Oblak
Teja Haver	"Virtual Girl"	Aleš Čadež, Teja Haver
Zablujena generacija	"Kdo hoče plesati z menoj?"	Matjaž Alič, Dare Kaurič
Žana	"Druga violina"	Josip Miani-Pipi, Igor Amon Mazul
Zlati muzikanti	"Pepelka"	Marko Pezdric, Slavko Božic

==== Semi-finals ====
The two semi-finals of EMA 2007 took place on 1 and 2 February 2007. The first semi-final was hosted by Peter Poles and Bernarda Žarn, while the second semi-final was hosted by Mojca Mavec and Gorazd Dominko. In addition to the performances of the competing entries, Eroica, Nuša Derenda (who represented Slovenia in 2001) and Anžej Dežan (who represented Slovenia in 2006) performed as guests during the first semi-final, while Saša Lendero and Pepel in kri performed as guests during the second semi-final. A public televote selected seven entries to proceed to the final from each semi-final.

Semi-final 1 – 1 February 2007
R/O	Artist	Song	Televote	Place
1	Panda	"Nemirna leta"	460	12
2	Lunapark	"Slike"	689	10
3	Eva Moškon and Črnobelo	"Ljubim se"	1,429	8
4	Alenka Gotar	"Cvet z juga"	2,908	4
5	Zablujena generacija	"Kdo hoče plesati z menoj?"	4,003	3
6	Jernej Dermota	"Moj planet"	1,083	9
7	Martin Perović	"Zadeni me"	2,291	6
8	Sebastian	"Naj svet zakriči!"	2,439	5
9	Alya	"Vizija"	1,944	7
10	Diona Dimm	"Oče"	672	11
11	Dean Vivod and Tonus Kitaris	"Hitmejker"	4,217	2
12	Don Corleone	"Bella mia"	5,081	1

Semi-final 2 – 2 February 2007
R/O	Artist	Song	Televote	Place
1	Eva Černe	"Čudeži smehljaja"	5,144	1
2	Bojana Glatz	"Vse se isto zdi"	454	12
3	Brigitt Rose and Wladimir	"Prižgi vecni plamen / Light Eternal Flame"	871	11
4	Folklora	"19XX"	1,409	8
5	Rok Kosmač	"Ko še spiš"	1,279	9
6	Teja Haver	"Virtual Girl"	1,004	10
7	Nude	"Element ^{104}L_{(258)}"	4,362	2
8	Žana	"Druga violina"	2,396	6
9	Zlati muzikanti	"Pepelka"	3,143	3
10	Tadeja Fatur	"Drugačna (pesem)"	1,690	7
11	Steffy and Donald Trumpet	"Zadel si me v živo"	3,107	4
12	Denis	"Nor sem nate"	2,875	5

==== Final ====
The final of EMA 2007 took place on 3 February 2007 and was hosted by Helena Blagne Zaman and Mario Galunič. In addition to the performances of the competing entries, Jan Plestenjak, Jure Godler, Rožmarinke, Katrina Leskanich (who won Eurovision for the United Kingdom in 1997) and Hari Mata Hari (who represented Bosnia and Herzegovina in 2006) performed as guests. The winner was selected over two rounds of public televoting. In the first round, two entries were selected to proceed to the second round. In the second round, "Cvet z juga" performed by Alenka Gotar was selected as the winner.

Final – 3 February 2007
R/O	Artist	Song	Televote	Place
1	Alya	"Vizija"	3,971	12
2	Zlati muzikanti	"Pepelka"	6,141	8
3	Dean Vivod and Tonus Kitaris	"Hitmejker"	6,500	7
4	Nude	"Element ^{104}L_{(258)}"	9,136	5
5	Sebastian	"Naj svet zakrici!"	5,567	9
6	Denis	"Nor sem nate"	3,806	13
7	Don Corleone	"Bella mia"	10,596	3
8	Tadeja Fatur	"Drugacna (pesem)"	1,791	14
9	Zablujena generacija	"Kdo hoce plesati z menoj?"	9,953	4
10	Žana	"Druga violina"	7,804	6
11	Alenka Gotar	"Cvet z juga"	20,123	2
12	Steffy and Donald Trumpet	"Zadel si me v živo"	5,193	10
13	Martin Perović	"Zadeni me"	4,467	11
14	Eva Černe	"Čudeži smehljaja"	20,509	1

Superfinal – 3 February 2007
R/O	Artist	Song	Televote	Place
1	Alenka Gotar	"Cvet z juga"	44,636	1
2	Eva Černe	"Čudeži smehljaja"	31,324	2

=== Promotion ===
Alenka Gotar made several appearances across Europe to specifically promote "Cvet z juga" as the Slovenian Eurovision entry. On 24 and 25 February, Alenka Gotar performed during the final of the Spanish Eurovision national final Misión Eurovisión 2007. The following day, she performed during the Montenegrin Eurovision national final MontenegroSong 2007. On 1 March, Gotar performed during the Bosnian song presentation show BH Eurosong 2007. On 7 March, Gotar performed during the semi-final of the Serbian Eurovision national final Beovizija 2007. Between 3 and 7 April, Gotar completed promotional activities in Croatia and Macedonia where she made appearances on television programmes and talk shows.

== At Eurovision ==
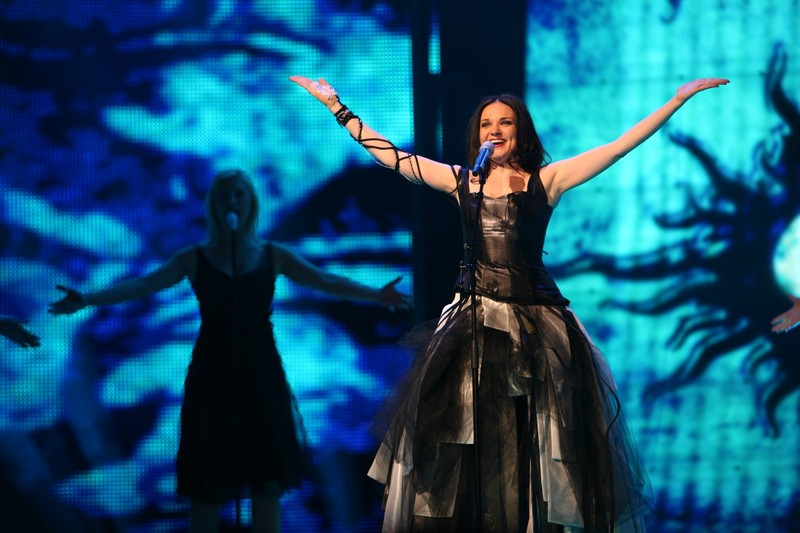
Alenka Gotar performing at the Eurovision Song Contest

According to Eurovision rules, all nations with the exceptions of the host country, the "Big Four" (France, Germany, Spain, and the United Kingdom) and the ten highest placed finishers in the 2006 contest are required to qualify from the semi-final on 10 May 2007 in order to compete for the final on 12 May 2007. On 12 March 2007, a special allocation draw was held which determined the running order for the semi-final. As one of the five wildcard countries, Slovenia chose to perform in position 25, following the entry from Belgium and before the entry from Turkey.

In Slovenia, the semi-final was televised on TV SLO 2 and the final was televised on TV SLO 1. Both shows featured commentary by Mojca Mavec. RTVSLO appointed Peter Poles as its spokesperson to announce the Slovenian votes during the final.

=== Semi-final ===
Alenka Gotar took part in technical rehearsals on 4 and 6 May, followed by dress rehearsals on 9 and 10 May. The Slovenian performance featured Alenka Gotar performing in a black and white shredded gown, joined by five backing vocalists on stage. Gotar also held white LED lights in her hands, representing the white flower of the south, of which she shone on her face during the performance. The stage colours were neon blue and the LED screens displayed a classical background superimposed by large sun symbols. The five backing vocalists that joined Alenka Gotar were: Amira Hidić, the co-composer of "Cvet z juga" Andrej Babić, Martina Majerle, Polona Furlan and Rudi Bučar.

At the end of the show, Slovenia was announced as having finished in the top ten and subsequently qualifying for the grand final. This marked the first time that Slovenia qualified to the final of the Eurovision Song Contest from a semi-final since the introduction of semi-finals in 2004. It was later revealed that the Slovenia placed seventh in the semi-final, receiving a total of 140 points.

=== Final ===
The draw for the running order for the final was done by the presenters during the announcement of the ten qualifying countries during the semi-final and Slovenia was drawn to perform in position 7, following the entry from Macedonia and before the entry from Hungary. Alenka Gotar once again took part in dress rehearsals on 11 and 12 May before the final and Gotar performed a repeat of her semi-final performance during the final on 12 May. Slovenia placed fifteenth in the final, scoring 66 points.

=== Voting ===
Below is a breakdown of points awarded to Slovenia and awarded by Slovenia in the semi-final and grand final of the contest. The nation awarded its 12 points to Serbia in the semi-final and the final of the contest.

==== Points awarded to Slovenia ====
Points awarded to Slovenia (Semi-final)
Score	Country
12 points	
10 points	Croatia
8 points	Andorra; Montenegro
7 points	Hungary; Poland; Portugal; Serbia; Spain; Ukraine
6 points	Belarus; Belgium; Bosnia and Herzegovina; Netherlands
5 points	Bulgaria; Latvia; Macedonia; Malta; Norway; Russia
4 points	Czech Republic; Romania
3 points	Moldova; Turkey
2 points	Austria
1 point	France; Ireland

Points awarded to Slovenia (Final)
Score	Country
12 points	
10 points	
8 points	Montenegro
7 points	Bosnia and Herzegovina; Croatia
6 points	Macedonia
5 points	Malta; Serbia
4 points	Belarus; Latvia; Poland; Ukraine
3 points	Portugal; Russia; Spain
2 points	Belgium
1 point	Lithuania

==== Points awarded by Slovenia ====
Points awarded by Slovenia (Semi-final)
Score	Country
12 points	Serbia
10 points	Macedonia
8 points	Croatia
7 points	Latvia
6 points	Hungary
5 points	Montenegro
4 points	Andorra
3 points	Bulgaria
2 points	Switzerland
1 point	Portugal

Points awarded by Slovenia (Final)
Score	Country
12 points	Serbia
10 points	Macedonia
8 points	Bosnia and Herzegovina
7 points	Bulgaria
6 points	Latvia
5 points	Hungary
4 points	Ukraine
3 points	Russia
2 points	Georgia
1 point	Moldova
