= Giuliano Đanić =

Croatian musician

- Also known as: Giuliano
- Born: Giuliano Đanić; 14 May 1973 (age 53); Split, SR Croatia, SFR Yugoslavia (today Croatia)
- Genres: Pop
- Occupation: Singer
- Instrument: Vocals
- Years active: 1988–present
- Label: Croatia Records

Giuliano Đanić (born 14 May 1973), known professionally as Giuliano, is a Croatian pop singer.

== Music career ==
In mid 1988, Giuliano, along with Siniša Vuco, formed the rock band Kleopatra. The band released three singles "Odlazim", "Hladna noć", and "Svi u jedan glas". The band broke up in late 1989. After the break up of Kleopatra, Đanić, along with Zlatko Brodarić, formed the band Apokalipsa. The band's debut album Ljubav za ljubav, bol za bol was released in 1991.

Giuliano has participated seven times in HRT Dora, Croatia's annual music competition and national selection for the Eurovision Song Contest. He made his debut in 1996 performing "Sjaj u očima otkriva te", which finished fifth with 104 points. He returned to the contest again in 1999 with "Dobro mi došla ljubavi" finishing sixth. A year later in 2000, Đanić participated with the song "Srna i vuk" and finished third in the final with a total of 160 points. Đanić participated in Dora 2003, performing "Moja lipa", written and composed by Tomislav Mrduljaš. He reached the final from the second semifinal on 8 March 2003 and finished seventh in the final with 60 points. After taking a four-year break from the contest, Đanić returned to the 2007 edition with the song "Pismom te ljubi milijun mandolina" and placed fifth. A year later, in 2008, he finished eleventh with the song "Plava vještica" written by Miro Buljan and Nenad Ninčević. The 2010 edition of the contest was the last one with Đanić as a participant. With the song "Moja draga" he qualified from the semi-final on 5 March 2010 to the final the next day, where he placed eighth with 18 points.

His best-known songs include "Lipoto moja", "Ćutin se lipo", "Gori more", "Zovem prijatelje moje", "Veći od ljubavi" and the Porin-winning hit "Jugo", all renowned for their emotional intensity and firm tenor delivery.

In 2022 he collaborated with ZETZ, Pero Galić, Mario Roth, Ivan Penezić and Igor Delač on a number-one charting single "Idemo Hrvatska" which spent 4 weeks at a number-one position of the official Croatian airplay chart HR Top 40.

== Politics ==
Giuliano has repeatedly sung at Croatian Party of Rights's pre-election rallies. During the 2005 Croatian presidential election he sang at Jadranka Kosor's rallies. During the 2011 Croatian parliamentary election he was a candidate of the Croatian Party of Rights in the third district but failed to be elected into the Croatian Parliament.

== Discography ==
- Giuliano (1995)
- Boje ljubavi (1998)
- Giuliano u Lisinskom (1999)
- Svijet tvoje čarolije (2001)
- Ugasi žeđ (2003)
- Moje 80e (2007)
- Sada imam sve (2012)
