= Turkey in the Eurovision Song Contest 2007 =

- Eurovision Song Contest 2007
- Participating broadcaster: Türkiye Radyo ve Televizyon Kurumu (TRT)
- Country: Turkey
- Selection process: Internal selection
- Announcement date: Artist: 19 December 2006; Song: 9 March 2007

Competing entry
- Song: "Shake It Up Şekerim"
- Artist: Kenan Doğulu
- Songwriters: Kenan Doğulu

Placement
- Semi-final result: Qualified (3rd, 198 points)
- Final result: 4th, 163 points

Participation chronology

Turkey was represented at the Eurovision Song Contest 2007 with the song "Shake It Up Şekerim", written and performed by Kenan Doğulu. The Turkish participating broadcaster, Türkiye Radyo ve Televizyon Kurumu (TRT), internally selected its entry for the contest. The announcement of Kenan Doğulu occurred on 19 December 2006, while "Shake It Up Şekerim" was presented to the public on 9 March 2007.

Turkey competed in the semi-final of the Eurovision Song Contest which took place on 10 May 2007. Performing during the show in position 26, "Shake It Up Şekerim" was announced among the top 10 entries of the semi-final and therefore qualified to compete in the final on 12 May. It was later revealed that Turkey placed third out of the 28 participating countries in the semi-final with 198 points. In the final, Turkey performed in position 22 and placed fourth out of the 24 participating countries, scoring 163 points.

== Background ==
Prior to the 2007 contest, Türkiye Radyo ve Televizyon Kurumu (TRT) had participated in the Eurovision Song Contest representing Turkey 28 times since its first entry in 1975. It missed the 1979 contest because Arab countries pressured the Turkish government to withdraw from the contest because of the dispute over the Status of Jerusalem, and the 1994 contest due to a poor average score from the preceding contests, which ultimately led to relegation. It had won the contest once: in 2003 with the song "Everyway That I Can" performed by Sertab Erener. Its least successful result was in 1987 when it placed 22nd (last) with the song "Şarkım Sevgi Üstüne" by Seyyal Taner and Lokomotif, receiving 0 points in total.

As part of its duties as participating broadcaster, TRT organises the selection of its entry in the Eurovision Song Contest and broadcasts the event in the country. The broadcaster confirmed its participation in the 2007 contest on 24 November 2006. TRT has used various methods to select its entry in the past, such as internal selections and televised national finals to choose the performer and song to compete at Eurovision. In order to select the Turkish representative at the 2003 contest, TRT opted to internally select both the artist and song.

== Before Eurovision ==
=== Internal selection ===
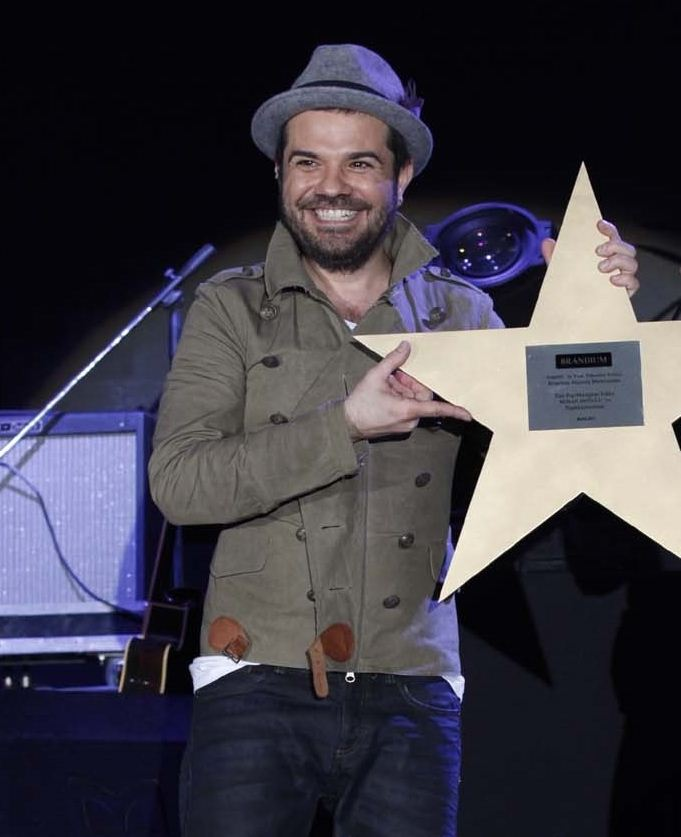
Kenan Doğulu was internally selected to represent Turkey in Eurovision

On 19 December 2006, TRT announced that it had internally selected Kenan Doğulu to represent Turkey in the Eurovision Song Contest 2007. Other artists rumoured in Turkish media prior to the artist announcement included singers Murat Boz, Nil Karaibrahimgli, Şebnem Ferah and Zerrin Özer as well as the bands maNga, Mor ve Ötesi and Yüksek Sadakat. In February 2007, Doğulu submitted three songs, which he selected from an initial nine songs he wrote himself, to TRT for consideration and a five-member selection committee selected his contest entry. The committee consisted of Ali Güney (TRT General Manager), Muhsin Mete (TRT Deputy General Manager), Deniz Çakmakoğlu (TRT Deputy Head of Music), Muhsin Yıldırım (Ankara Television director) and Kenan Doğulu.

The song Kenan Doğulu would perform at the contest, "Shake It Up Şekerim", was announced on 9 February 2007 and presented to the public on 9 March 2007 during a press conference that took place at the TRT Tepebaşı Studios in Istanbul and televised on TRT 1 and TRT Int as well as streamed online via the TRT's official website trt.net.tr. In regards to the song selection, Doğulu stated: "It was very difficult to shorten the list to three songs. We have chosen a cheerful up-tempo song. May it bring us luck".

=== Promotion ===
Kenan Doğulu made several appearances across Europe to specifically promote "Shake It Up Şekerim" as the Turkish Eurovision entry. On 31 March, Doğulu performed at a concert which was held at the Sand Entertainment Park in Amsterdam, Netherlands. On 14 April, Doğulu performed at a Eurovision party which was organised by eurosong.be and held at the D-Club in Antwerp, Belgium. On 20 April, Doğulu took part in promotional activities in Athens, Greece, which included a performance at the Mega TV morning show Omorfo Kosmos. Other countries that Kenan Doğulu appeared in as part of his promotional tour included Georgia, Germany, Romania, Spain, Switzerland, Ukraine and the United Kingdom.

== At Eurovision ==
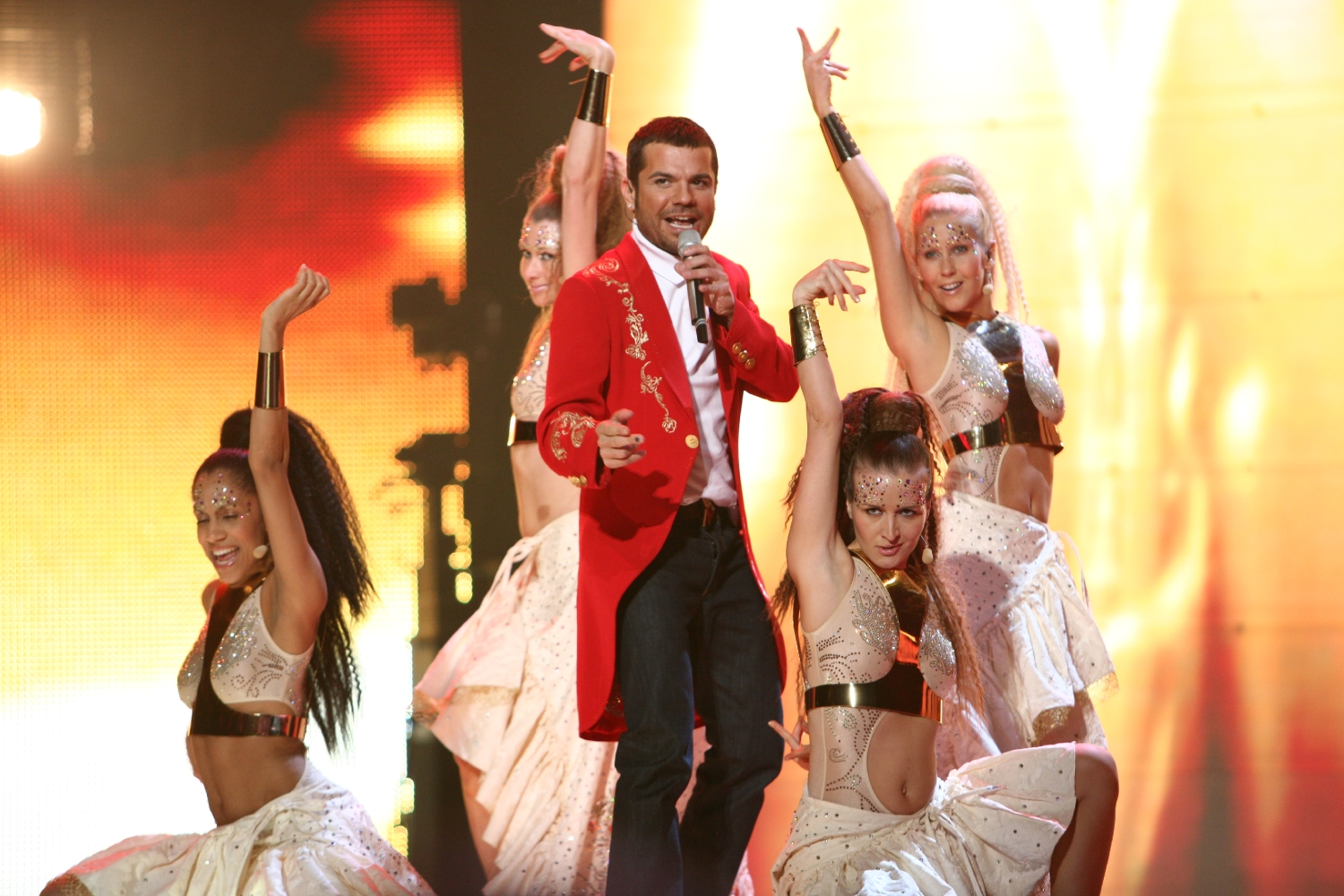
Kenan Doğulu performing at the Eurovision Song Contest

According to Eurovision rules, all nations with the exceptions of the host country, the "Big Four" (France, Germany, Spain and the United Kingdom) and the ten highest placed finishers in the 2006 contest are required to qualify from the semi-final on 10 May 2007 in order to compete for the final on 12 May 2007. On 12 March 2007, an allocation draw was held which determined the running order for the semi-final. As one of the five wildcard countries, Turkey chose to perform in position 26, following the entry from Slovenia and before the entry from Austria.

Both the semi-final and the final were broadcast in Turkey on TRT 1 and TRT Int with commentary by Hakan Urgancı. TRT appointed Meltem Ersan Yazgan as its spokesperson to announce the top 12-point score awarded by the Turkish televote.

=== Semi-final ===
Kenan Doğulu took part in technical rehearsals on 4 and 6 May, followed by dress rehearsals on 9 and 10 May. The Turkish performance featured Kenan Doğulu on stage in jeans, a white T-shirt and a red and gold jacket with 1,450 Swarovski crystals, designed by Turkish fashion designer Ceyda Balaban, and performing a choreographed dance routine with four dancers. The performance began with Doğulu appearing hidden in a golden cloth held by his dancers with the LED screens displaying the words "Shake It" against a predominantly gold background. The four dancers that joined Kenan Doğulu were: Charlie Mayhew, Dominique Tipper, Jessica Forsman and Sarah Merry. A backing vocalist, Murat Çekem, also joined the performers on stage.

At the end of the show, Turkey was announced as having finished in the top 10 and subsequently qualifying for the grand final. It was later revealed that Georgia placed third in the semi-final, receiving a total of 198 points.

=== Final ===
The draw for the running order for the final was done by the presenters during the announcement of the ten qualifying countries during the semi-final and Turkey was drawn to perform in position 22, following the entry from Bulgaria and before the entry from Armenia. Kenan Doğulu once again took part in dress rehearsals on 11 and 12 May before the final and performed a repeat of his semi-final performance during the final on 12 May. Turkey placed fourth in the final, scoring 163 points.

=== Voting ===
Below is a breakdown of points awarded to Turkey and awarded by Turkey in the semi-final and grand final of the contest. The nation awarded its 12 points to Bulgaria in the semi-final and to Armenia in the final of the contest.

==== Points awarded to Turkey ====
Points awarded to Turkey (Semi-final)
| Score | Country |
|---|---|
| 12 points | Albania; Belgium; France; Germany; Netherlands; United Kingdom |
| 10 points | Austria; Bulgaria; Moldova; Switzerland |
| 8 points | Bosnia and Herzegovina; Denmark; Macedonia; Romania |
| 7 points | Andorra; Finland; Russia; Sweden |
| 6 points | Hungary; Norway |
| 5 points | |
| 4 points | |
| 3 points | Iceland; Montenegro |
| 2 points | Armenia; Spain |
| 1 point | Czech Republic; Poland; Ukraine |

Points awarded to Turkey (Final)
| Score | Country |
|---|---|
| 12 points | Belgium; France; Germany; Netherlands; United Kingdom |
| 10 points | Albania; Austria; Bosnia and Herzegovina; Denmark; Macedonia; Switzerland |
| 8 points | |
| 7 points | Bulgaria; Norway; Romania; Sweden |
| 6 points | |
| 5 points | |
| 4 points | Finland |
| 3 points | Iceland |
| 2 points | Georgia; Russia |
| 1 point | Hungary; Moldova; Montenegro; Ukraine |

==== Points awarded by Turkey ====
Points awarded by Turkey (Semi-final)
| Score | Country |
|---|---|
| 12 points | Bulgaria |
| 10 points | Georgia |
| 8 points | Moldova |
| 7 points | Malta |
| 6 points | Macedonia |
| 5 points | Belarus |
| 4 points | Albania |
| 3 points | Slovenia |
| 2 points | Andorra |
| 1 point | Hungary |

Points awarded by Turkey (Final)
| Score | Country |
|---|---|
| 12 points | Armenia |
| 10 points | Bosnia and Herzegovina |
| 8 points | Russia |
| 7 points | Moldova |
| 6 points | Bulgaria |
| 5 points | Georgia |
| 4 points | Greece |
| 3 points | Ukraine |
| 2 points | Romania |
| 1 point | Macedonia |
