= Croatia in the Eurovision Song Contest 2007 =

- Eurovision Song Contest 2007
- Participating broadcaster: Hrvatska radiotelevizija (HRT)
- Country: Croatia
- Selection process: Dora 2007
- Selection date: 3 March 2007

Competing entry
- Song: "Vjerujem u ljubav"
- Artist: Dragonfly feat. Dado Topić
- Songwriters: Dado Topić

Placement
- Semi-final result: Failed to qualify (16th)

Participation chronology

Croatia was represented at the Eurovision Song Contest 2007 with the song "Vjerujem u ljubav", written by Dado Topić, and performed by the band Dragonfly featuring Dado Topić. The Croatian participating broadcaster, Hrvatska radiotelevizija (HRT), organised the national final Dora 2007 to select its entry for the contest. Thirty-two entries competed in the national final which consisted of three shows: two semi-finals and a final. Eight entries qualified from each semi-final on 1 and 2 March 2007 to compete in the final on 3 March 2007. In the final, "Vjerujem u ljubav" performed by Dragonfly featuring Dado Topić was selected as the winner following the combination of votes from a five-member jury panel and a public televote.

Croatia competed in the semi-final of the Eurovision Song Contest which took place on 10 May 2007. Performing during the show in position 13, "Vjerujem u ljubav" was not announced among the top 10 entries of the semi-final and therefore did not qualify to compete in the final. This marked the first time that Croatia failed to qualify to the final of the Eurovision Song Contest from a semi-final since the introduction of semi-finals in 2004. It was later revealed that Croatia placed sixteenth out of the 28 participating countries in the semi-final with 54 points.

== Background ==
Prior to the 2007 contest, Hrvatska radiotelevizija (HRT) had participated in the Eurovision Song Contest representing Croatia fourteen times since its first entry in 1993. Its best result in the contest was fourth, achieved on two occasions: in 1996 with the song "Sveta ljubav" performed by Maja Blagdan and in 1999 with the song "Marija Magdalena" performed by Doris Dragović. Following the introduction of semi-finals for the 2004, it had featured in every final they participated in thus far. In 2006, Croatia was an automatic finalist with "Moja štikla" by Severina.

As part of its duties as participating broadcaster, HRT organises the selection of its entry in the Eurovision Song Contest and broadcasts the event in the country. The broadcaster confirmed its participation in the 2007 contest on 31 October 2006. Since 1993, HRT organised the national final Dora in order to select its entry for the Eurovision Song Contest, a method that was continued for its 2007 participation.

== Before Eurovision ==
=== Dora 2007 ===
Dora 2007 was the fifteenth edition of the national selection Dora organised by HRT to select its entry for the Eurovision Song Contest 2007. The competition consisted of two semi-finals on 1 and 2 March 2007 and a final on 3 March 2007, all taking place at the Hotel Kvarner in Opatija and broadcast on HTV 1.

==== Format ====
Thirty-two songs competed in Dora 2007 which consisted of three shows: two semi-finals and a final. Sixteen songs competed in each semi-final with the top eight proceeding to complete the sixteen-song lineup in the final. The results of all shows were determined by public televoting and the votes from a jury panel. The ranking developed by both streams of voting was converted to points from 1 (lowest) to 16 (highest) and assigned to the competing songs. Ties were decided in favour of the entry that received the most points from the jury.

The jury that voted in all three shows consisted of:

- Silvije Glojnarić – HRT
- Željen Klašterka – HTV
- Aleksandar Kostadinov – HTV
- Ljiljana Vinković – HTV
- Robert Urlić – HR

==== Competing entries ====
On 30 November 2006, HRT opened a submission period where artists and composers were able to submit their interest in participating in the competition by 8 December 2006 and submit their entries to the broadcaster with the deadline on 8 January 2007. 100 entries were received by the broadcaster during the submission period. A five-member expert committee consisting of Silvije Glojnarić (HRT), Robert Urlić (HR), Ljiljana Vinković (HTV), Željen Klašterka (HTV) and Aleksandar Kostadinov (HTV) reviewed the received submissions and selected thirty-two artists and songs for the competition. HRT announced the competing entries on 23 January 2007 and among the artists were Goran Karan (who represented Croatia in 2000), Claudia Beni (who represented Croatia in 2003), and Feminnem (who represented Bosnia and Herzegovina in 2005). On 27 January 2007, Barbara Munjas replaced Claudia Beni as the performer of the song "Ti si tu". On 29 January 2007, Giuliano replaced Goran Karan as the performer of the song "Pismom te ljubi milijun mandolina". On 10, 17 and 24 February 2007, the competing artists performed their entries live during the preview programme Ususret dori broadcast on HRT 1.

Artist	Song	Songwriter(s)
Alen Vitasović	"Sve bi za nju da"	Rudolf Dvorski
Angels	"Male vještice"	Marko Tomasović, Mario Šimunović
Anja Šovagović and Galiano Pahor	"Teatar"	Ines Prajo, Arijana Kunštek
Antonija Šola	"Neka bude zauvijek"	Petra Crnetić, Antonija Šola
Ayra	"Još sam uvijek tvoj"	Ivan Bajsar, Naim Ayra
Barbara Munjas	"Ti si tu"	Dean Bakić
Brentini	"Što je to ljudima"	Denis Kraljević, Alen Brentini
Danijela Pintarić	"Moj svijet"	Andrej Baša, Robert Pilepić
Dragonfly feat. Dado Topić	"Vjerujem u ljubav"	Dado Topić
Esmeralda Kresina	"Malo za zauvijek"	Ines Prajo, Arijana Kunštek
Feminnem	"Navika"	Miroslav Lesić, Fayo
Giuliano	"Pismom te ljubi milijun mandolina"	Miro Buljan, Nenad Ninčević
Ibrica Jusić	"Nikada zaboravljena"	Branimir Mihaljević, Fayo
Ivana Radovniković	"Samo probaj"	Marko Tomasović, Dario Brzoja, Đuro Zifra
Jelena Rozga	"Nemam"	Tonči Huljić, Vjekoslava Huljić
Kemal Monteno	"Poljubi me"	Franjo Valentić, Fayo
Klapa Maslina	"Gitara i čaša vina"	Dušan Šarac, Krste Juras
Kraljevi ulice and Sandra Bagarić	"Pjesma za novčić"	Miran Hadži Veljković
Lana Klingor	"Gravitacija"	Bruno Kovačić, Ivana Plechinger
Livio Morosin and Miroslav Evačić	"Volim ja"	Miroslav Evačić
Luka Nižetić	"Pusti me u san"	Milana Vlaović
Marko Tolja	"Deja vu"	Andrej Baša
Milan Terze	"Ljubavnica"	Bruno Kovačić, Ivana Plechinger
Ness	"Ti si moj"	Emir Bešić, Anita Kolovrat Dzuzel
Raspashow	"Bio bih samo njen"	Ivan Škunca
Sabrina Hebiri	"Tražit ću te"	Marko Tomasović, Mario Šimunović, Krešimir Vrpka
The Sick Swing Orchestra	"Šlager pjevač"	Ante Žužul, Josip Tocilj, Krešimir Tomić
Tina Vukov	"Tata"	Robert Funčić
Trio Fantasticus	"Nema šanse šećeru"	Mladen Burnać, Fayo
Valentina Bralo	"Ljubavna priča"	Valentina Bralo
Vivien Galletta and Voljen Grbac	"Riječi dvije"	Ivan Brdar
Žanamari Lalić	"Jedino moje"	Silvio Pasarić, Žanamari Lalić

==== Semi-finals ====
The two semi-finals took place on 1 and 2 March 2007. The first semi-final was hosted by Duško Ćurlić, Mirko Fodor and Iva Šulentić, while the second semi-final was hosted by Duško Ćurlić, Mirko Fodor and Barbara Štrbac; Nikolina Pišek hosted segments from the green room in the first semi-final, while Iva Jerković hosted segments from the green room in the second semi-final. The eight qualifiers for the final from each semi-final were determined by a 50/50 combination of votes from a five-member jury panel and a public televote.

In addition to the performances of the competing entries, Boris Novković (who represented Croatia in 2005) performed as the interval act during the first semi-final, while Vanna (who represented Croatia in 2001) performed as the interval act during the second semi-final.

Semi-final 1 – 1 March 2007
R/O	Artist	Song	Jury	Televote		Total	Place
R/O	Artist	Song	Jury	Votes	Points	Total	Place
1	Angels	"Male vještice"	3	1,270	9	12	11
2	Alen Vitasović	"Sve bi za nju da"	6	1,203	7	13	10
3	Ivana Radovniković	"Samo probaj"	5	778	4	9	14
4	Ibrica Jusić	"Nikada zaboravljena"	11	272	2	13	9
5	Ayra	"Još sam uvijek tvoj"	4	216	1	5	16
6	Luka Nižetić	"Pusti me u san"	10	1,951	12	22	5
7	Klapa Maslina	"Gitara i čaša vina"	8	2,496	13	21	7
8	Marko Tolja	"Deja vu"	10	1,597	11	21	6
9	Feminnem	"Navika"	13	1,306	10	23	4
10	Esmeralda Kresina	"Malo za zauvijek"	3	1,248	8	11	12
11	Lana Klingor	"Gravitacija"	12	843	5	17	8
12	Kraljevi ulice and Sandra Bagarić	"Pjesma za novčić"	16	4,939	15	31	2
13	Milan Terze	"Ljubavnica"	1	957	6	7	15
14	Dragonfly feat. Dado Topić	"Vjerujem u ljubav"	16	5,149	16	32	1
15	Vivien Galletta and Voljen Grbac	"Riječi dvije"	7	606	3	10	13
16	Giuliano	"Pismom te ljubi milijun mandolina"	14	3,801	14	28	3

Detailed Jury Votes
R/O	Song	Jurors					Total	Points
R/O	Song	1	2	3	4	5	Total	Points
1	"Male vještice"	5	6	5	5	5	26	3
2	"Sve bi za nju da"	5	7	5	7	6	30	6
3	"Samo probaj"	6	6	5	6	6	29	5
4	"Nikada zaboravljena"	7	7	7	7	7	35	11
5	"Još sam uvijek tvoj"	6	6	5	5	5	27	4
6	"Pusti me u san"	6	7	7	7	7	34	10
7	"Gitara i čaša vina"	5	6	7	8	7	33	8
8	"Deja vu"	7	8	6	7	6	34	10
9	"Navika"	7	8	8	8	8	39	13
10	"Malo za zauvijek"	5	5	5	5	6	26	3
11	"Gravitacija"	8	7	7	8	8	38	12
12	"Pjesma za novčić"	9	9	10	10	9	47	16
13	"Ljubavnica"	5	5	5	5	5	25	1
14	"Vjerujem u ljubav"	9	9	10	10	9	47	16
15	"Riječi dvije"	7	6	6	7	6	32	7
16	"Pismom te ljubi milijun mandolina"	8	7	9	10	8	42	14

Semi-final 2 – 2 March 2007
R/O	Artist	Song	Jury	Televote		Total	Place
R/O	Artist	Song	Jury	Votes	Points	Total	Place
1	Barbara Munjas	"Ti si tu"	2	1,460	9	11	12
2	Raspashow	"Bio bih samo njen"	6	661	3	9	14
3	Žanamari Lalić	"Jedino moje"	5	1,067	6	11	11
4	Kemal Monteno	"Poljubi me"	11	1,562	10	21	7
5	Livio Morosin and Miroslav Evačić	"Volim ja"	16	1,216	7	23	5
6	Antonija Šola	"Neka bude zauvijek"	5	2,087	12	17	9
7	Ness	"Ti si moj"	5	600	2	7	15
8	Trio Fantasticus	"Nema šanse šećeru"	8	3,445	15	23	6
9	Valentina Bralo	"Ljubavna priča"	2	822	4	6	16
10	Danijela Pintarić	"Moj svijet"	13	3,482	16	29	1
11	Sabrina Hebiri	"Tražit ću te"	9	532	1	10	13
12	Jelena Rozga	"Nemam"	14	2,123	13	27	3
13	Brentini	"Što je to ljudima"	8	990	5	13	10
14	Tina Vukov	"Tata"	15	2,485	14	29	1
15	The Sick Swing Orchestra	"Šlager pjevač"	13	1,670	11	24	4
16	Anja Šovagović and Galiano Pahor	"Teatar"	11	1,256	8	19	8

Detailed Jury Votes
R/O	Song	Jurors					Total	Points
R/O	Song	1	2	3	4	5	Total	Points
1	"Ti si tu"	5	5	5	5	5	25	2
2	"Bio bih samo njen"	5	6	6	6	6	29	6
3	"Jedino moje"	6	6	6	5	5	28	5
4	"Poljubi me"	7	6	6	8	7	34	11
5	"Volim ja"	8	9	10	9	10	46	16
6	"Neka bude zauvijek"	6	6	5	6	5	28	5
7	"Ti si moj"	7	5	6	5	5	28	5
8	"Nema šanse šećeru"	7	6	7	5	5	30	8
9	"Ljubavna priča"	5	5	5	5	5	25	2
10	"Moj svijet"	7	7	6	8	7	35	13
11	"Tražit ću te"	7	6	7	6	6	32	9
12	"Nemam"	8	7	8	7	7	37	14
13	"Što je to ljudima"	7	5	6	6	6	30	8
14	"Tata"	9	9	8	9	8	43	15
15	"Šlager pjevač"	7	7	7	7	7	35	13
16	"Teatar"	6	7	7	7	7	34	11

==== Final ====
The final took place on 3 March 2007, hosted by Duško Ćurlić, Mirko Fodor, Iva Šulentić and Barbara Štrbac with Nikolina Pišek and Iva Jerković hosting segments from the green room. The winner, "Vjerujem u ljubav" performed by Dragonfly featuring Dado Topić, was determined by a 50/50 combination of votes from a five-member jury panel and a public televote. In addition to the performances of the competing entries, the show was opened by 2006 Croatian Eurovision entrant Severina, while 1987 Yugoslav Eurovision entrant Novi fosili performed as the interval act.

Final – 3 March 2007
R/O	Artist	Song	Jury	Televote		Total	Place
R/O	Artist	Song	Jury	Votes	Points	Total	Place
1	Lana Klingor	"Gravitacija"	8	2,038	3	11	13
2	Marko Tolja	"Deja vu"	8	2,388	4	12	12
3	The Sick Swing Orchestra	"Šlager pjevač"	3	1,351	2	5	16
4	Kemal Monteno	"Poljubi me"	3	2,579	5	8	15
5	Feminnem	"Navika"	9	3,628	7	16	9
6	Giuliano	"Pismom te ljubi milijun mandolina"	12	6,142	11	23	5
7	Livio Morosin and Miroslav Evačić	"Volim ja"	15	2,820	6	21	6
8	Anja Šovagović and Galiano Pahor	"Teatar"	8	772	1	9	14
9	Luka Nižetić	"Pusti me u san"	5	4,925	8	13	11
10	Tina Vukov	"Tata"	14	5,928	10	24	4
11	Jelena Rozga	"Nemam"	12	5,351	9	21	7
12	Trio Fantasticus	"Nema šanse šećeru"	3	7,566	12	15	10
13	Kraljevi ulice and Sandra Bagarić	"Pjesma za novčić"	14	16,172	16	30	2
14	Dragonfly feat. Dado Topić	"Vjerujem u ljubav"	16	15,958	15	31	1
15	Danijela Pintarić	"Moj svijet"	12	12,161	14	26	3
16	Klapa Maslina	"Gitara i čaša vina"	4	9,552	13	17	8

Detailed Jury Votes
R/O	Song	Jurors					Total	Points
R/O	Song	1	2	3	4	5	Total	Points
1	"Gravitacija"	7	7	7	7	7	35	8
2	"Deja vu"	7	8	7	7	6	35	8
3	"Šlager pjevač"	6	6	7	6	7	32	3
4	"Poljubi me"	6	6	6	7	7	32	3
5	"Navika"	7	8	7	7	7	36	9
6	"Pismom te ljubi milijun mandolina"	7	7	8	8	7	37	12
7	"Volim ja"	9	9	10	9	10	47	15
8	"Teatar"	6	8	7	7	7	35	8
9	"Pusti me u san"	6	7	7	7	7	34	5
10	"Tata"	9	10	9	9	9	46	14
11	"Nemam"	8	7	8	7	7	37	12
12	"Nema šanse šećeru"	7	7	6	6	6	32	3
13	"Pjesma za novčić"	9	9	10	9	9	46	14
14	"Vjerujem u ljubav"	9	9	10	10	10	48	16
15	"Moj svijet"	8	7	7	8	7	37	12
16	"Gitara i čaša vina"	6	6	7	7	7	33	4

=== Promotion ===
Dragonfly and Dado Topić specifically promoted "Vjerujem u ljubav" as the Croatian Eurovision entry on 8 March 2007 by performing during the final of the Serbian Eurovision national final Beovizija 2007. The artists also took part in promotional activities in Bosnia and Herzegovina, Macedonia, and Slovenia.

== At Eurovision ==
According to Eurovision rules, all nations with the exceptions of the host country, the "Big Four" (France, Germany, Spain, and the United Kingdom) and the ten highest placed finishers in the 2006 contest are required to qualify from the semi-final on 10 May 2007 in order to compete for the final on 12 May 2007. On 12 March 2007, a special allocation draw was held which determined the running order for the semi-final and Croatia was set to perform in position 13, following the entry from Denmark and before the entry from Poland.

Both the semi-final and the final were broadcast in Croatia on HTV 1 with commentary by Duško Ćurlić. HRT appointed Barbara Kolar as its spokesperson to announce the Croatian votes during the final.

=== Semi-final ===
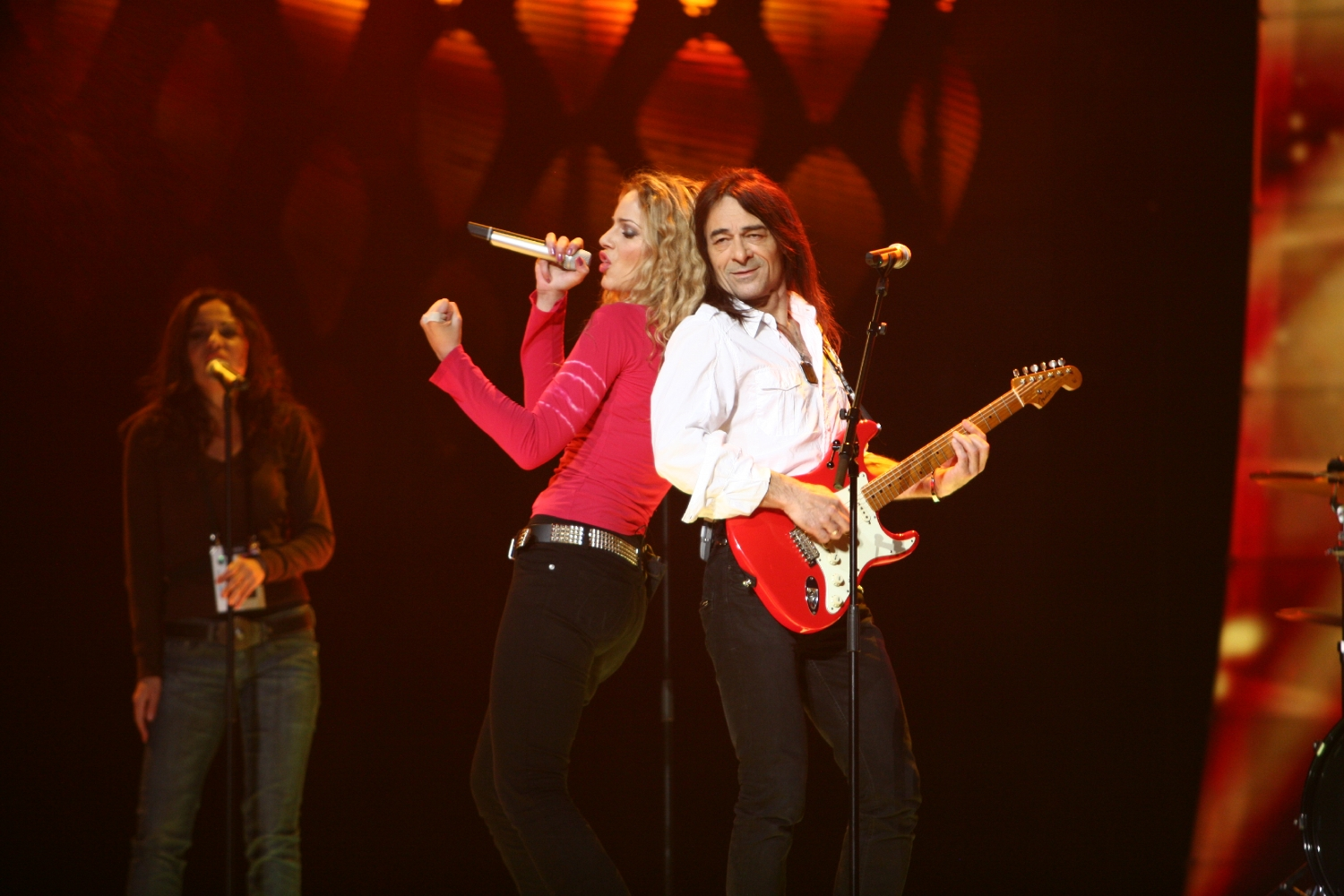
Dragonfly and Dado Topić during a rehearsal before the semi-final

Dragonfly and Dado Topić took part in technical rehearsals on 3 and 5 May, followed by dress rehearsals on 11 and 12 May. The Croatian performance featured the members of Dragonfly and Dado Topić dressed in black. The stage lighting was dark with the LED screens displaying amber and red colours against a black background. Dragonfly and Topić were joined on stage by a backing vocalist: Anita Mlinarić.

At the end of the show, Croatia was not announced among the top 10 entries in the semi-final and therefore failed to qualify to compete in the final. This marked the first time that Croatia failed to qualify to the final of the Eurovision Song Contest from a semi-final since the introduction of semi-finals in 2004. It was later revealed that Croatia placed sixteenth in the semi-final, receiving a total of 54 points.

=== Voting ===
Below is a breakdown of points awarded to Croatia and awarded by Croatia in the semi-final and grand final of the contest. The nation awarded its 12 points to Serbia in the semi-final and the final of the contest.

==== Points awarded to Croatia ====
Points awarded to Croatia (Semi-final)
Score	Country
12 points	
10 points	Bosnia and Herzegovina
8 points	Slovenia
7 points	Austria; Montenegro
6 points	Macedonia; Serbia
5 points	Switzerland
4 points	
3 points	Albania
2 points	Germany
1 point	

==== Points awarded by Croatia ====
Points awarded by Croatia (Semi-final)
Score	Country
12 points	Serbia
10 points	Slovenia
8 points	Macedonia
7 points	Hungary
6 points	Bulgaria
5 points	Montenegro
4 points	Latvia
3 points	Albania
2 points	Andorra
1 point	Switzerland

Points awarded by Croatia (Final)
Score	Country
12 points	Serbia
10 points	Bosnia and Herzegovina
8 points	Macedonia
7 points	Slovenia
6 points	Bulgaria
5 points	Ukraine
4 points	Hungary
3 points	Russia
2 points	Georgia
1 point	Latvia
