= Moldova in the Eurovision Song Contest 2007 =

- Eurovision Song Contest 2007
- Participating broadcaster: TeleRadio-Moldova (TRM)
- Country: Moldova
- Selection process: Pentru Eurovision 2007
- Selection date: 14 December 2006

Competing entry
- Song: "Fight"
- Artist: Natalia Barbu
- Songwriters: Alexandru Brașoveanu; Elena Buga

Placement
- Semi-final result: Qualified (10th, 91 points)
- Final result: 10th, 109 points

Participation chronology

Moldova was represented at the Eurovision Song Contest 2007 with the song "Fight", written by Alexandru Brașoveanu and Elena Buga, and performed by Natalia Barbu. The Moldovan participating broadcaster, TeleRadio-Moldova (TRM), internally selected its entry for the contest though a process entitled Pentru Eurovision 2007. 34 entries competed to represent Moldova, with three being shortlisted to participate in a live audition on 14 December 2006 where "Fight" performed by Natalia Barbu was selected by an expert jury.

Moldova competed in the semi-final of the Eurovision Song Contest which took place on 10 May 2007. Performing during the show in position 9, "Fight" was announced among the top 10 entries of the semi-final and therefore qualified to compete in the final on 12 May. It was later revealed that Moldova placed tenth out of the 28 participating countries in the semi-final with 91 points. In the final, Moldova was the closing performance of the show in position 24, placing tenth out of the 24 participating countries with 109 points.

== Background ==
Prior to the 2007 Contest, TeleRadio-Moldova (TRM) had participated in the Eurovision Song Contest representing Moldova two times since its first entry in 2005. Its best placing in the contest was sixth, achieved in 2005 with the song "Boonika bate doba" performed by Zdob și Zdub. In 2006, "Loca" performed by Arsenium featuring Natalia Gordienko and Connect-R placed twentieth in the final.

As part of its duties as participating broadcaster, TRM organises the selection of its entry in the Eurovision Song Contest and broadcasts the event in the country. The broadcaster confirmed its intentions to participate at the 2007 contest on 15 November 2006 despite having considered to withdraw due to lack of funds for participation. TRM opted to select its entry in 2007 via an internal selection, marking the first time that a Moldovan entry was internally selected; the broadcaster has selected its entry via a national selection show in 2005 and 2006.

== Before Eurovision ==
=== Pentru Eurovision 2007 ===
Artists and composers had the opportunity to submit their entries between 26 November 2006 and 10 December 2006. Both artists and songwriters were required to be of Moldovan nationality and could each submit more than one song. Artists were also required to fund their own potential participation at the Eurovision Song Contest with TRM only covering the expense of the entrance fee, but in the event of a top ten placing at the final of the contest all expenses would be covered by TRM instead. At the conclusion of the submission deadline, 34 valid entries out of 35 were received by the broadcaster; "Can You" performed by 3 BUCKS was disqualified. Among the artists that submitted a song was Zdob și Zdub (who represented Moldova in 2005).

The selection of the Moldovan entry for the Eurovision Song Contest 2007, entitled Pentru Eurovision 2007, took place over two rounds. The first round occurred on 13 December 2006 where a jury consisting of Valentin Dânga (composer), Ghenadie Ciobanu (composer), Oleg Baraliuc (composer), Inesa Stratulat (singer), Vlad Costandoi (producer), Natalia Brasnuev (President of OGAE Moldova), Rodica Ciorănică (journalist and editor at VIP Magazine) and Diana Stratulat (general producer of NIT TV) was to select seven to ten entries out of the 34 received to proceed to the second round. However, only three were ultimately shortlisted due to the large margin of votes received between the third and fourth ranked entries. The second round was a live audition of the three entries in front of the jury panel that took place on 14 December 2006, where "Fight" performed by Natalia Barbu was selected to represent Moldova.

First Round – 13 December 2006
R/O	Artist	Song	Songwriter(s)	Result
1	R.A.S.A.	"Universal Cow"	Bulat V.	—N/a
2	DJ Orion	"Desperado"	DJ Orion	—N/a
3	Sasha Bognibov	"I Don't Know Why"	Alexandru Bognibov	—N/a
4	Artur Osipean	"Moye serdtse" (Moe ceрдце)	Artur Osipean	—N/a
5	Pavel Parfeni	"Steaua mea"	Pavel Parfeni	—N/a
6	Mircea	"Vreau să-ți spun"	Mircea Boian	—N/a
7	R. Atamaniuc	"Black and White"	Rodion Atamaniuc	—N/a
8	Corbus Albus	"Trap"	Denis Andreev, Anna Constantinova	—N/a
9	DOLL	"Muzica mă face tânăr"	Cristian Zavadschi, Mihai Eminescu	—N/a
10	Future Positive	"High Like the Angels"	Gladchii	—N/a
11	ADAM	"Crazy World"	Adam Hrupalo, Anatol Neagu	—N/a
12	Adam and Irina Vasilicova	"Forever These Nights"	Adam Hrupalo	—N/a
13	Ala and Andries	"A Butt of Love"	Tachii	—N/a
14	Ion Velcing	"Crede-mă"	Ion Velcing	—N/a
15	Pro Bachus	"Dac-aș fi zeu"	Sandu Gorgos, Ady Carp	—N/a
16	Thales	"Hora de sărbătoare"	Cebotari	—N/a
17	Cezara	"I'm Not Your Slave"	Tamaz Djgarcova	—N/a
18	Natalia Barbu	"Fight"	Alexandru Brașoveanu, Elena Buga	Advanced
19	Moldstar	"Honey Love"	Marian Stîrcea, Radmila Popovici-Paraschiv	—N/a
20	Olia Tira	"Your Place or Mine?"	Ruslan Țăranu	Advanced
21	Scroom	"Stop"	Scroom	—N/a
22	Lou	"Miss Mistery"	Vadim Luchin	—N/a
23	Georgeta Daraban	"Dincolo de cer"	Alexandru Cosovan, Traian Vasilcău	—N/a
24	Aylin	"Dragostea"	Alexandru Cosovan, Traian Vasilcău	—N/a
25	Perla	"I Do Believe"	Perla	—N/a
26	Olesea Ceaicovschi	"Where the Shadows Fall"	Olesea Ceaicovschi	—N/a
27	Acord	"Maria"	Maria Stoianov	—N/a
28	Anghelina	"I Would Fly"	Anghelina Serebreacova	—N/a
29	Catrina Paslaru	"Birth of a Clown"	Catrina Paslaru	—N/a
30	Prinzip	"Lenuta"	Bordea	—N/a
31	Marcella	"My World - My Home"	Leo, Spita	—N/a
32	Aliona	"I Love You"	Curlichin, Curlichina	—N/a
33	Zdob şi Zdub	"Space Cowboys"	Mihai Gîncu, Roman Iagupov, Jaro	Advanced
34	Liusia Znamensky	"We're Here"	Safrin	—N/a

Second Round – 14 December 2006
R/O	Artist	Song	Points	Place
1	Natalia Barbu	"Fight"	94	1
2	Olia Tira	"Your Place or Mine?"	70	3
3	Zdob şi Zdub	"Space Cowboys"	76	2

=== Promotion ===
Natalia Barbu specifically promoted "Fight" as the Moldovan Eurovision entry on 6 March by performing the song as a guest during the sixth show of the Spanish Eurovision national final.

== At Eurovision ==
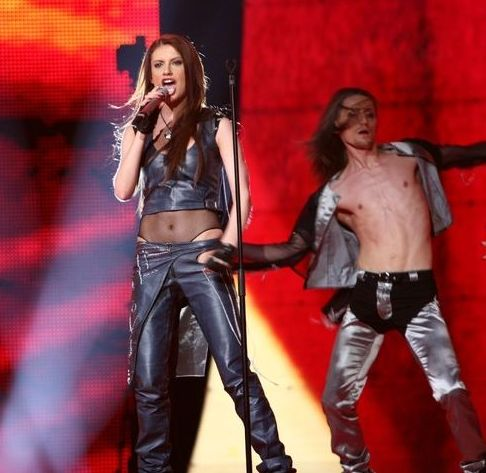
Natalia Barbu performing at the Eurovision Song Contest

According to Eurovision rules, all nations with the exceptions of the host country, the "Big Four" (France, Germany, Spain, and the United Kingdom) and the ten highest placed finishers in the 2006 contest are required to qualify from the semi-final on 10 May 2007 in order to compete for the final on 12 May 2007; the top ten countries from the semi-final progress to the final. On 12 March 2007, a special allocation draw was held which determined the running order for the semi-final and Moldova was set to perform in position 9, following the entry from Switzerland and before the entry from the Netherlands.

The two shows were televised in Moldova on Moldova 1 and broadcast via radio on Radio Moldova. All broadcasts featured commentary by Vitalie Rotaru. TRM appointed Andrei Porubin as its spokesperson to announce the Moldovan votes during the final.

=== Semi-final ===
Natalia Barbu took part in technical rehearsals on 3 and 5 May, followed by dress rehearsals on 9 and 10 May. The Moldovan performance featured Natalia Barbu dressed in a leather top with leather trousers and performing on stage with three dancers and two backing vocalists. The performance began with Barbu appearing silhouetted against the stage, and a violin solo was later performed by the singer with the dancers performing a routine that included flying red scarves as well as raising and twirling a large silver silken banner. The stage featured LED screen projections that transition from neon lines to burning sparks and streams of metal. The backing vocalists that joined Natalia Barbu on stage are Liusia Znamensky and Rodica Aculova.

At the end of the show, Moldova was announced as having finished in the top ten and subsequently qualifying for the grand final. It was later revealed that Moldova placed tenth in the semi-final, receiving a total of 91 points.

=== Final ===
The draw for the running order for the final was done by the presenters during the announcement of the ten qualifying countries during the semi-final and Moldova was drawn to perform last in position 24, following the entry from Armenia. Natalia Barbu once again took part in dress rehearsals on 11 and 12 May before the final and performed a repeat of her semi-final performance during the final on 12 May. Moldova placed tenth in the final, scoring 109 points.

=== Voting ===
Below is a breakdown of points awarded to Moldova and awarded by Moldova in the semi-final and grand final of the contest. The nation awarded its 12 points to Belarus in the semi-final and to Romania in the final of the contest.

==== Points awarded to Moldova ====
Points awarded to Moldova (Semi-final)
Score	Country
12 points	Belarus; Portugal; Romania
10 points	
8 points	Turkey
7 points	Armenia; Georgia
6 points	Cyprus; Russia; Spain; Ukraine
5 points	
4 points	
3 points	Greece; Israel
2 points	Ireland
1 point	Bulgaria

Points awarded to Moldova (Final)
Score	Country
12 points	Romania
10 points	Greece; Portugal
8 points	Belarus
7 points	Ukraine; Turkey
6 points	Poland; Russia; Spain
5 points	Hungary
4 points	Andorra; Bulgaria; Israel
3 points	Armenia; Georgia
2 points	Cyprus; Finland; Ireland; Lithuania; Sweden
1 point	Macedonia; Norway; Serbia; Slovenia

==== Points awarded by Moldova ====
Points awarded by Moldova (Semi-final)
Score	Country
12 points	Belarus
10 points	Turkey
8 points	Georgia
7 points	Portugal
6 points	Serbia
5 points	Bulgaria
4 points	Estonia
3 points	Slovenia
2 points	Latvia
1 point	Norway

Points awarded by Moldova (Final)
Score	Country
12 points	Romania
10 points	Belarus
8 points	Russia
7 points	Ukraine
6 points	Greece
5 points	Serbia
4 points	Georgia
3 points	Bulgaria
2 points	Armenia
1 point	Turkey
