= Latvia in the Eurovision Song Contest 2007 =

- Eurovision Song Contest 2007
- Participating broadcaster: Latvijas Televīzija (LTV)
- Country: Latvia
- Selection process: Eirodziesma 2007
- Selection date: 24 February 2007

Competing entry
- Song: "Questa notte"
- Artist: Bonaparti.lv
- Songwriters: Kjell Jennstig; Torbjörn Wassenius; Francesca Russo

Placement
- Semi-final result: Qualified (5th, 168 points)
- Final result: 16th, 54 points

Participation chronology

Latvia was represented at the Eurovision Song Contest 2007 with the song "Questa notte" written by Kjell Jennstig, Torbjörn Wassenius, and Francesca Russo, and performed by the group Bonaparti.lv. The Latvian participating broadcaster, Latvijas Televīzija (LTV), organised the national final Eirodziesma 2007 in order to select its entry for the contest. Twenty songs were selected to compete in the national final, which consisted of three shows: two semi-finals and a final. In the semi-finals on 27 January and 3 February 2007, five entries were selected to advance from each show: three entries selected based on a public televote and two entries selected by a seven-member jury panel. Ten songs ultimately qualified to compete in the final on 1 March 2008 where two rounds of public voting selected "Questa notte" performed by Bonaparti.lv as the winner.

Latvia competed in the semi-final of the Eurovision Song Contest which took place on 10 May 2007. Performing as the closing entry during the show in position 28, "Questa notte" was announced among the top 10 entries of the semi-final and therefore qualified to compete in the final on 12 May. It was later revealed that Latvia placed fifth out of the 28 participating countries in the semi-final with 168 points. In the final, Latvia performed in position 14 and placed sixteenth out of the 24 participating countries, scoring 54 points.

== Background ==
Prior to the 2007 contest, Latvijas Televīzija (LTV) had participated in the Eurovision Song Contest representing Latvia seven times since its first entry in 2000. It won the contest once in 2002 with the song "I Wanna" performed by Marie N. Following the introduction of semi-finals for the 2004, Latvia was able to qualify to compete in the final in 2005 with "The War Is Not Over" performed by Walters and Kazha and in 2006 with "I Hear Your Heart" performed by the vocal group Cosmos.

As part of its duties as participating broadcaster, LTV organises the selection of its entry in the Eurovision Song Contest and broadcasts the event in the country. The broadcaster confirmed its intentions to participate at the 2007 contest on 15 September 2006. LTV has selected its entries for the Eurovision Song Contest through a national final. Since their debut in 2000, it had organised the selection show Eirodziesma. Along with its participation confirmation, the broadcaster announced that they would organise Eirodziesma 2007 in order to select its entry for the 2007 contest.

== Before Eurovision ==
=== Eirodziesma 2007 ===
Eirodziesma 2007 was the eighth edition of Eirodziesma, the music competition organised by LTV to select its entries for the Eurovision Song Contest. The competition commenced on 27 January 2007 and concluded with a final on 24 February 2007. All shows in the competition were hosted by Uģis Joksts, Kristīne Virsnīte and Kārlis Streips, and broadcast on LTV1.

==== Format ====
The format of the competition consisted of three shows: two semi-finals and a final. The two semi-finals, held on 27 January and 3 February 2007, each featured ten competing entries from which five advanced to the final from each show. The final, held on 24 February 2007, selected the Latvian entry for Helsinki from the remaining ten entries over two rounds of voting: the first round selected the top three songs and the second round (superfinal) selected the winner. Results during the semi-final shows were determined by a jury panel and votes from the public. The songs first faced a public vote where the top three entries qualified. The jury then selected an additional two qualifiers from the remaining entries to proceed in the competition. In the final, a public vote exclusively determined which entry would be the winner. Viewers were able to vote via telephone or SMS.

==== Competing entries ====
Artists and songwriters were able to submit their entries to the broadcaster between 4 October 2006 and 20 November 2006. A record 106 entries were submitted at the conclusion of the submission period, including songs in Latvian, Russian, Swedish, English, Spanish, and Finnish. A jury panel appointed by LTV evaluated the submitted songs and selected twenty entries for the competition. The jury panel consisted of Wig Wam (who represented Norway in 2005), Zdob și Zdub (who represented Moldova in 2005), Andrius Mamontovas (who represented Lithuania in 2006 as part of LT United), Mario Galunič (Slovenian television presenter), Cosmos (who represented Latvia in 2006), Guna Zučika (representative of MTV Baltic) and Sandris Vanzovičs (music journalist). The twenty competing artists and songs were announced during a press conference on 11 December 2006.

Artist	Song	Songwriter(s)
Aisha	"Close Your Eyes"	Valters Frīdenbergs
Beate	"I Will"	Artūrs Palkēvičs, Iveta Priede
Bonaparti.lv	"Questa notte"	Kjell Jennstig, Torbjörn Wassenius, Francesca Russo
Elli U	"Always and Forever"	Artūrs Palkēvičs, Roberto Meloni
Elli U	"Trans-European Express"	Virginia Barrett
Ēnas	"Always"	Lauris Valters
Gunārs Kalniņš and Jolanda Suvorova	"What a Love Can Do to Me"	Gunārs Kalniņš
H2O	"Boys Never Tell They're Sorry"	Mārtiņš Freimanis
Igete Gaiķe	"Dundari Dandari"	Igete Gaiķe
Intars Busulis	"Gonki" (Гонки)	Intars Busulis, Kārlis Lācis, Sergejs Timofejevs
Iveta Baumane	"In Our Life"	Iveta Baumane, Ingars Viļums
Johnny Salamander, Meldra and The Rockettes	"The Legends of Rock'n Roll"	Robert Wells
Kesija	"You Are Losing Me"	Marcos Ubeda, Terry Cox
Klaidonis and Linita	"My Vow to You"	Māris Sloka, Earl J. Dawson
Lenii	"Take Off Your Mask"	Lauris Reiniks
Morning After	"Bye My Baby, Bye"	Mārtiņš Freimanis
Red Bee	"Can't Buy Good Lovin'"	Indra Klimoviča, Ieva Rudzīte, Antra Lante, Nelli Bubujanca
Re:Public	"Home"	Re:Public, Jānis Rībens
Stacey	"Feels Like Heaven"	Anastasija Polipina, Roberto Meloni
VIA Meitenes	"Little Bit of This"	Rūta Reinika

==== Semi-finals ====
The two semi-finals took place on 27 January and 3 February 2007. The live portion of the show was held at the LTV studios in Riga where the artists awaited the results while their performances, which were filmed earlier at the Riga Film Studio in Riga on 18 and 20 January 2007, were screened. In each semi-final ten acts competed and five entries qualified to the final. The competing entries first faced a public vote where the top three songs advanced; an additional two qualifiers were then selected from the remaining seven entries by the jury. The jury panel that voted in the semi-finals consisted of Mirdza Zīvere (singer and director), Elita Patmalniece (costume designer), Baiba Šmite (director of LTV1), Uldis Rudaks (music journalist), Juris Kulakovs (musician), Kārlis Auzāns (producer and composer) and Mārcis Gulbis (producer).

Public vote qualifier Jury qualifier

Semi-final 1 – 27 January 2007
R/O	Artist	Song	Jury	Televote		Result
R/O	Artist	Song	Jury	Votes	Rank	Result
1	Beate	"I Will"	9	1,019	10	—N/a
2	Elli U	"Trans-European Express"	10	1,070	9	—N/a
3	Red Bee	"Can't Buy Good Lovin'"	2	2,465	4	Qualified
4	Re:Public	"Home"	5	2,485	3	Qualified
5	Ēnas	"Always"	6	2,071	7	—N/a
6	Iveta Baumane	"In Our Life"	7	1,175	8	—N/a
7	Gunārs Kalniņš and Jolanda Suvorova	"What a Love Can Do to Me"	1	5,840	2	Qualified
8	Igete Gaiķe	"Dundari Dandari"	3	2,366	5	Qualified
9	H2O	"Boys Never Tell They're Sorry"	4	2,128	6	—N/a
10	Lenii	"Take Off Your Mask"	8	7,537	1	Qualified

Semi-final 2 – 3 February 2007
R/O	Artist	Song	Jury	Televote		Result
R/O	Artist	Song	Jury	Votes	Rank	Result
1	Intars Busulis	"Gonki"	1	4,856	4	Qualified
2	VIA Meitenes	"Little Bit of This"	4	3,977	5	—N/a
3	Johnny Salamander, Meldra and The Rockettes	"The Legends of Rock'n Roll"	3	2,855	8	Qualified
4	Morning After	"Bye My Baby, Bye"	6	1,252	9	—N/a
5	Bonaparti.lv	"Questa notte"	2	9,909	1	Qualified
6	Aisha	"Close Your Eyes"	5	3,042	6	—N/a
7	Kesija	"You Are Losing Me"	9	5,620	3	Qualified
8	Stacey	"Feels Like Heaven"	8	583	10	—N/a
9	Klaidonis and Linita	"My Vow to You"	10	7,004	2	Qualified
10	Elli U	"Always and Forever"	7	3,040	7	—N/a

==== Final ====
The final took place at the Olympic Center in Ventspils on 24 February 2007. The ten entries that qualified from the preceding two semi-finals competed and the winner was selected over two rounds of public televoting. In the first round, the top three songs advanced to the second round, the superfinal. In the superfinal, "Questa notte" performed by Bonaparti.lv was declared the winner. In addition to the performances of the competing entries, guest performers included singer Jenny May together with the group Double Faced Eels, singer Ella together with the dance group Dzirnas, the group Labvēlīgais tips, Cosmos (who represented Latvia in 2006) and The Jet Set (who represented Poland in 2007).

Final – 24 February 2007
R/O	Artist	Song	Televote	Place
1	Intars Busulis	"Gonki"	13,219	2
2	Johnny Salamander, Meldra and The Rockettes	"The Legends of Rock'n Roll"	3,728	7
3	Red Bee	"Can't Buy Good Lovin'"	2,002	10
4	Lenii	"Take Off Your Mask"	10,477	4
5	Gunārs Kalniņš and Jolanda Suvorova	"What a Love Can Do to Me"	12,776	3
6	Re:public	"Home"	5,945	6
7	Ksenija	"You Are Losing Me"	2,635	9
8	Bonaparti.lv	"Questa notte"	32,900	1
9	Klaidonis and Linita	"My Vow to You"	6,702	5
10	Igeta and Project Bradans	"Dundari Dandari"	3,329	8

Superfinal – 24 February 2007
R/O	Artist	Song	Televote	Place
1	Intars Busulis	"Gonki"	16,676	2
2	Gunārs Kalniņš and Jolanda Suvorova	"What a Love Can Do to Me"	13,838	3
3	Bonaparti.lv	"Questa notte"	49,422	1

==== Ratings ====
Viewing figures by show
Show	Air date	Viewing figures		Ref.
Show	Air date	Nominal	Share	Ref.
Final	24 February 2007	350,000	15.8%	

== At Eurovision ==
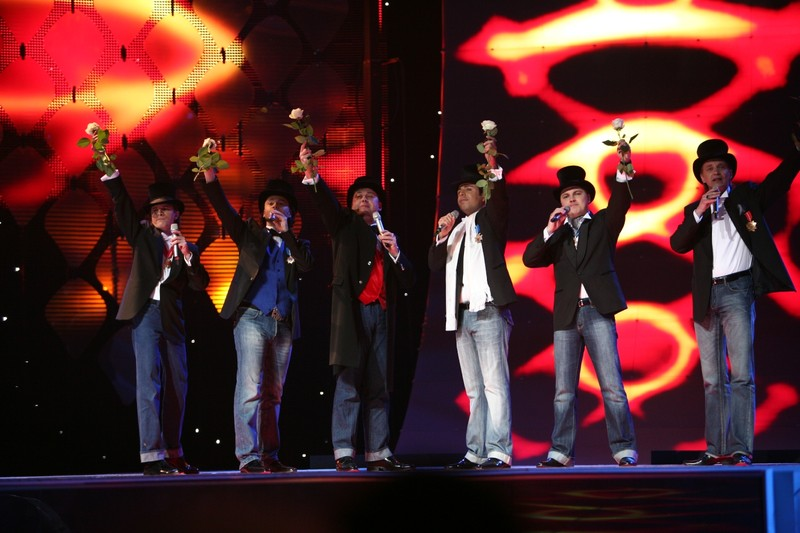
Bonaparti.lv performing at the Eurovision Song Contest

According to Eurovision rules, all nations with the exceptions of the host country, the "Big Four" (France, Germany, Spain and the United Kingdom) and the ten highest placed finishers in the 2006 contest are required to qualify from the semi-final on 10 May 2007 in order to compete for the final on 12 May 2007. On 12 March 2007, a special allocation draw was held which determined the running order for the semi-final. As one of the five wildcard countries, Latvia chose to perform last in position 28, following the entry from Austria.

The semi-final and the final were broadcast in Latvia on LTV1 with all shows featuring commentary by Kārlis Streips. LTV appointed Jānis Šipkevics as its spokesperson to announce the Latvian votes during the final.

=== Semi-final ===
Bonaparti.lv took part in technical rehearsals on 4 and 6 May, followed by dress rehearsals on 9 and 10 May. The Latvian performance featured the members of Bonaparti.lv wearing suits with a top hat and appearing on stage one by one carrying white roses. The stage colours were in white and gold with the LED screens displaying a set of golden rings with hints of red accompanied by bright beams of light shooting from the roof to the stage and the surrounding areas of the arena.

At the end of the show, Latvia was announced as having finished in the top 10 and subsequently qualifying for the grand final. It was later revealed that Latvia placed fifth in the semi-final, receiving a total of 188 points.

=== Final ===
The draw for the running order for the final was done by the presenters during the announcement of the ten qualifying countries during the semi-final and Latvia was drawn to perform in position 14, following the entry from France and before the entry from Russia. Bonaparti.lv once again took part in dress rehearsals on 11 and 12 May before the final and performed a repeat of their semi-final performance during the final on 12 May. Latvia placed sixteenth in the final, scoring 54 points.

=== Voting ===
Below is a breakdown of points awarded to Latvia and awarded by Latvia in the semi-final and grand final of the contest. The nation awarded its 12 points to Estonia in the semi-final and to Ukraine in the final of the contest.

==== Points awarded to Latvia ====
Points awarded to Latvia (Semi-final)
Score	Country
12 points	Estonia; Ireland; Lithuania; Malta; Poland
10 points	Israel
8 points	Belgium; Portugal; United Kingdom
7 points	Netherlands; Norway; Slovenia
6 points	
5 points	Cyprus; Denmark; Georgia; Iceland; Romania
4 points	Croatia; Hungary
3 points	Czech Republic; Finland; Ukraine
2 points	Belarus; Moldova; Russia; Switzerland
1 point	Austria; Greece; Sweden

Points awarded to Latvia (Final)
Score	Country
12 points	
10 points	Estonia; Ireland; Lithuania
8 points	
7 points	
6 points	Slovenia
5 points	
4 points	Malta; United Kingdom
3 points	Netherlands; Norway
2 points	Romania
1 point	Croatia; Poland

==== Points awarded by Latvia ====
Points awarded by Latvia (Semi-final)
Score	Country
12 points	Estonia
10 points	Belarus
8 points	Hungary
7 points	Georgia
6 points	Iceland
5 points	Slovenia
4 points	Switzerland
3 points	Portugal
2 points	Serbia
1 point	Poland

Points awarded by Latvia (Final)
Score	Country
12 points	Ukraine
10 points	Lithuania
8 points	Belarus
7 points	Russia
6 points	Georgia
5 points	Hungary
4 points	Slovenia
3 points	Serbia
2 points	Bulgaria
1 point	Romania
