= Bulgaria in the Eurovision Song Contest 2007 =

- Eurovision Song Contest 2007
- Participating broadcaster: Bulgarian National Television (BNT)
- Country: Bulgaria
- Selection process: Bŭlgarskata pesen v „Evroviziya 2007”
- Selection date: 24 February 2007

Competing entry
- Song: "Water"
- Artist: Elitsa Todorova and Stoyan Yankoulov
- Songwriters: Elitsa Todorova; Stoyan Yankoulov

Placement
- Semi-final result: Qualified (6th, 146 points)
- Final result: 5th, 157 points

Participation chronology

Bulgaria was represented at the Eurovision Song Contest 2007 with the song "Water", written and performed by Elitsa Todorova and Stoyan Yankoulov. The Bulgarian participating broadcaster, Bulgarian National Television (BNT), organised the national final Bŭlgarskata pesen v „Evroviziya 2007” in order to select its entry for the contest. This was the first-ever entry performed in Bulgarian in the Eurovision Song Contest.

A total of 21 entries were selected to participate in the national final which consisted of two shows: a semi-final and a final, held on 3 February 2007 and 24 February 2007, respectively. Eighteen entries competed in the semi-final and the top nine songs as determined by a twelve-member jury panel qualified to the final alongside three pre-qualified songs. In the final, public televoting exclusively selected "Voda" (Вода) performed by Elitsa Todorova and Stoyan Yankoulov as the winning entry with 31,376 votes. The song was later retitled for Eurovision as "Water".

Bulgaria competed in the semi-final of the Eurovision Song Contest which took place on 10 May 2007. Performing as the opening entry for the show in position 1, "Water" was announced among the top 10 entries of the semi-final and therefore qualified to compete in the final on 12 May. This marked the first qualification to the final for Bulgaria since they debuted in the contest in 2005. It was later revealed that Bulgaria placed sixth out of the 28 participating countries in the semi-final with 146 points. In the final, Bulgaria performed in position 21 and placed fifth out of the 24 participating countries, scoring 157 points.

== Background ==
Prior to the 2007 contest, Bulgarian National Television (BNT) had participated in the Eurovision Song Contest representing Bulgaria two times since its first entry in 2005. To this point, it had yet to qualify for the final. In 2006, Mariana Popova and her song "Let Me Cry" failed to qualify for the final, making it the second consecutive failure to qualify for the country.

As part of its duties as participating broadcaster, BNT organises the selection of its entry in the Eurovision Song Contest and broadcasts the event in the country. The broadcaster confirmed its participation in the 2007 contest on 24 October 2006. Since 2005, BNT had organised a national final in order to select its entry for the competition, a selection procedure that continued for its 2007 entry.

== Before Eurovision ==
=== Bŭlgarskata pesen v „Evroviziya 2007” ===
Bŭlgarskata pesen v „Evroviziya 2007” (The Bulgarian song in Eurovision 2007) was the national final format developed by BNT which determined the artist and song that would represent Bulgaria at the Eurovision Song Contest 2007. The competition consisted of a semi-final on 3 February 2007 and a final on 24 February 2007, held at the National Palace of Culture in Sofia. Both shows were hosted by Dragomir Simeonov and Iva Doichinova and broadcast on Channel 1.

==== Competing entries ====
On 24 October 2006, BNT opened a submission period for artists and songwriters to submit their entries until 12 January 2007. Songs were required to contain partial Bulgarian involvement. By the end of the deadline, the broadcaster received 32 entries. On 14 January 2007, the eighteen artists and songs selected for the semi-final of the competition by a twelve-member committee were announced. The committee consisted of Vili Kazasyan (conductor and composer), Toncho Rusev (composer), Alexander Petrov (poet), Ana-Maria Tonkova (music journalist), Jivko Petrov (musician), Vasil Stefanov (director), Maga (composer), Slavcho Nikolov (musician and composer), Georgi Kushvaliev (music journalist), Angel Zaberski-son (musician and composer), Misho Shishkov (musician and composer) and Mariana Popova (singer). An additional three entries were produced by BNT and automatically qualified for the final of the competition.

On 16 January 2007, "Az moga!!!" performed by Pippo and Sasheto was disqualified from the competition due to plagiarism while Una Healy withdrew her song "Too Late for Heartache" due to prior engagements. They were replaced with the songs "Only Way Back Home" performed by Dimitar Atanasov and "V ochakvane" performed by Galin Raichev. On 19 January 2006, "Tova e lyubovta" performed by Orlin Goranov was withdrawn from the competition and replaced with the song "Say You Would" performed by Toni Dimitrova and Goresch Pyasak.

Artist	Song	Songwriter(s)	Selection
Aksiniya	"Az znam" (Аз знам)	Dani Milev, Vanya Schereva	Open submission
Bella	"Falling Angel"	Yasen Kozev, Krum Georgiev	Open submission
Dilyana Tsenova	"Confession"	Nivelin Mirkov, Dilyana Tsenova	Open submission
Dimitar Atanasov	"Only Way Back Home"	Dimitar Atanasov, Scherion Urumov	Open submission
Elitsa Todorova and Stoyan Yankoulov	"Voda" (Вода)	Elitsa Todorova, Stoyan Yankoulov	Produced by BNT
Galin Raichev	"V ochakvane" (В очакване)	Petr Pesev, Galin Raichev	Open submission
Grupata	"Back in Your Heart"	Johan Stentorp, Søren Bregendal, Jascha Richter	Open submission
Kalki	"Freedom and Love"	Kostadin Georgiev	Produced by BNT
KariZma	"Fool for You"	Galina Kurdova, Miroslav Kostadinov	Produced by BNT
Krum	"Dokoga" (Докога)	Miro Gechev, Krum Sirakov	Open submission
Margarita Hranova	"Moya lyubov" (Моя любов)	Alexandr Miladinov	Open submission
Mastilo	"Gettin' Crazy"	Desislav Danchev, Spas Dimitrov	Open submission
Natasha and Charlene	"Open Your Eyes"	Jonas Gladnikoff, Niall Mooney, Brendan McCarthy, Galya Marinova	Open submission
Pantommind	"Days of Old"	Petr Mihailov, Toni Ivanov	Open submission
Petia	"Runaway"	Petya Pavlova, Peter Godwin	Open submission
S-lavina	"Higher (Balkan Heart)"	Thomas Thörnholm, Michael Clauss, Danne Attlerud, Petr Panov	Open submission
Sofi Marinova and Ustata	"Ya tvoya" (Я твоя)	Ivan Georgiev-Ustata, Daniela Stoichkova	Open submission
Svetla Ivanova	"No No"	Yasen Kozev, Krum Georgiev	Open submission
Svetozar Hristov and Lora Vladova	"If You Come Baby"	Svetozar Hristov, Lora Vladova	Open submission
Tedi Katsarova	"Super Fire"	Peter Gorski, Tedi Katsarova	Open submission
Toni Dimitrova and Goresht Pyasak	"Say You Would"	Stefan Diomov, Plamen Stavrev	Open submission

==== Semi-final ====
The semi-final took place on 3 February 2007. Nine entries qualified to the final based on the votes of a jury panel. The twelve-person jury consisted of Vili Kazasyan, Toncho Rusev, Alexander Petrov, Ana-Maria Tonkova, Jivko Petrov, Vasil Stefanov, Magomed Aliyev-Maga, Slavcho Nikolov, Georgi Kushvaliev, Angel Zaberski, Misho Shishkov and Mariana Popova. In addition to the performances of the competing entries, guest performers were Vakali, Veda Junior and the three pre-qualified artists: Elitsa Todorova and Stoyan Yankoulov, Kalki and KariZma.

Semi-final – 3 February 2007
R/O	Artist	Song	Result
1	Svetozar Hristov and Lora Vladova	"If You Come Baby"	—N/a
2	Toni Dimitrova and Goresht Pyasak	"Say You Would"	Qualified
3	Petia	"Runaway"	—N/a
4	Grupata	"Back In Your Heart"	Qualified
5	Tedi Katsarova	"Super Fire"	Qualified
6	Pantommind	"Days of Old"	—N/a
7	Sofi Marinova and Ustata	"Ya tvoya"	Qualified
8	Svetla Ivanova	"No No"	—N/a
9	Mastilo	"Gettin' Crazy"	Qualified
10	Dilyana Tsenova	"Confession"	—N/a
11	Bella	"Falling Angel"	—N/a
12	Aksiniya	"Az znam"	Qualified
13	S-lavina	"Higher (Balkan Heart)"	Qualified
14	Margarita Hranova	"Moya lyubov"	Qualified
15	Natasha and Charlene	"Open Your Eyes"	—N/a
16	Dimitar Atanasov	"Only Way Back Home"	Qualified
17	Krum	"Dokoga"	—N/a
18	Galin Raichev	"V ochakvane"	—N/a

==== Final ====
The final took place on 24 February 2007. The nine semi-final qualifiers along alongside the three automatic qualifiers competed and "Voda" performed by Elitsa Todorova and Stoyan Yankoulov was selected as the winner exclusively by public televoting. In addition to the performances of the competing entries, guest performers were Vasil Naydenov and Bulgarian Eurovision Song Contest 2006 entrant Mariana Popova.

Final – 24 February 2007
R/O	Artist	Song	Televote	Place
1	Mastilo	"Gettin' Crazy"	1,772	8
2	Toni Dimitrova and Goresch Pyasak	"Say You Would"	1,703	9
3	Aksiniya	"Az znam"	562	12
4	Sofi Marinova and Ustata	"Ya tvoya"	4,345	3
5	Kalki	"Freedom and Love"	3,253	4
6	Margarita Hranova	"Moya lyubov"	629	11
7	Elitsa Todorova and Stoyan Yankoulov	"Voda"	31,376	1
8	S-lavina	"Higher (Balkan Heart)"	1,256	10
9	KariZma	"Fool for You"	5,232	2
10	Tedi Katsarova	"Super Fire"	2,174	7
11	Grupata	"Back In Your Heart"	2,574	5
12	Dimitar Atanasov	"Only Way Back Home"	2,386	6

=== Promotion ===
Elitsa Todorova and Stoyan Yankoulov made several appearances across Europe to specifically promote "Water" as the Bulgarian Eurovision entry. On 15 March, Elitsa and Stoyan performed "Water" during the Greek Eurovision national final Feel the Party. Between 21 and 24 March, Elitsa and Stoyan took part in promotional activities in Croatia and Serbia where they made radio and television appearances, including a performance during the Francophonie Night event which was held at the Sava Centar in Belgrade. On 25 March, the duo performed during the Stars of Europe concert which was held at the Colosseum in Rome, Italy. Elitsa and Stoyan also took part in a month-long cruise trip through Slovakia, Austria and Germany.

== At Eurovision ==
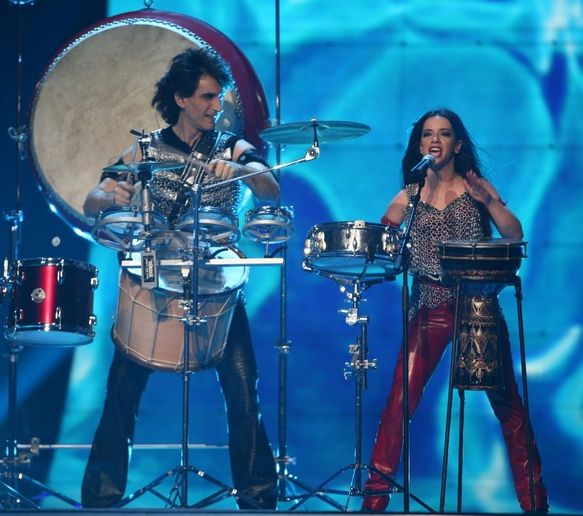
Elitsa Todorova and Stoyan Yankoulov performing at the Eurovision Song Contest

According to Eurovision rules, all nations with the exceptions of the host country, the "Big Four" (France, Germany, Spain and the United Kingdom) and the ten highest placed finishers in the 2006 contest are required to qualify from the semi-final on 10 May 2007 in order to compete for the final on 12 May 2007; the top ten countries from the semi-final progress to the final. On 12 March 2007, a special allocation draw was held which determined the running order for the semi-final and Bulgaria was set to open the show and perform in position 1, before the entry from Israel.

The semi-final and the final were broadcast in Bulgaria on Channel 1 with commentary by Elena Rosberg and Georgi Kushvaliev. BNT appointed Mira Dobreva as its spokesperson to announce the Bulgarian votes during the final.

=== Semi-final ===
Elitsa Todorova and Stoyan Yankoulov took part in technical rehearsals on 3 and 5 May, followed by dress rehearsals on 9 and 10 May. The Bulgarian performance featured Elitsa Todorova and Stoyan Yankoulov performing a drum routine. The stage colours transitioned from blue to red during the instrumental part of the song and the LED screens displayed clouds and lightning as well as water imagery. The performance also featured the use of a wind machine.

At the end of the show, Bulgaria was announced as having finished in the top 10 and subsequently qualifying for the grand final. This marked the first qualification to the final for Bulgaria since they debuted in the contest in 2005. It was later revealed that Bulgaria placed sixth in the semi-final, receiving a total of 146 points.

=== Final ===
The draw for the running order for the final was done by the presenters during the announcement of the ten qualifying countries during the semi-final and Bulgaria was drawn to perform in position 21, following the entry from Romania and before the entry from Turkey. Elitsa Todorova and Stoyan Yankoulov once again took part in dress rehearsals on 11 and 12 May before the final and performed a repeat of their semi-final performance during the final on 12 May. Bulgaria placed fifth in the final, scoring 157 points.

=== Voting ===
Below is a breakdown of points awarded to Bulgaria and awarded by Bulgaria in the semi-final and grand final of the contest. The nation awarded its 12 points to Macedonia in the semi-final and to Greece in the final of the contest.

==== Points awarded to Bulgaria ====
Points awarded to Bulgaria (Semi-final)
Score	Country
12 points	Cyprus; Turkey
10 points	Czech Republic; Greece; Spain
8 points	France; Hungary
7 points	Macedonia
6 points	Austria; Croatia; Israel; United Kingdom
5 points	Moldova; Montenegro; Portugal; Serbia
4 points	Germany
3 points	Bosnia and Herzegovina; Georgia; Malta; Slovenia
2 points	Belgium; Finland; Ukraine
1 point	Albania; Armenia; Romania

Points awarded to Bulgaria (Final)
Score	Country
12 points	Greece
10 points	Cyprus; Hungary; Spain
8 points	Macedonia
7 points	Czech Republic; Malta; Slovenia
6 points	Austria; Bosnia and Herzegovina; Croatia; Portugal; Serbia; Turkey
5 points	Finland; France; Montenegro; Romania; United Kingdom
4 points	Armenia; Belgium; Germany; Russia
3 points	Moldova; Ukraine
2 points	Latvia
1 point	Estonia

==== Points awarded by Bulgaria ====
Points awarded by Bulgaria (Semi-final)
Score	Country
12 points	Macedonia
10 points	Turkey
8 points	Serbia
7 points	Cyprus
6 points	Belarus
5 points	Slovenia
4 points	Hungary
3 points	Georgia
2 points	Albania
1 point	Moldova

Points awarded by Bulgaria (Final)
Score	Country
12 points	Greece
10 points	Macedonia
8 points	Armenia
7 points	Turkey
6 points	Serbia
5 points	Russia
4 points	Moldova
3 points	Ukraine
2 points	Romania
1 point	Belarus
