= Switzerland in the Eurovision Song Contest 2007 =

- Eurovision Song Contest 2007
- Participating broadcaster: Swiss Broadcasting Corporation (SRG SSR)
- Country: Switzerland
- Selection process: Internal selection
- Announcement date: Artist: 14 December 2006; Song: 21 February 2007

Competing entry
- Song: "Vampires Are Alive"
- Artist: DJ BoBo
- Songwriters: René Baumann; Axel Breitung

Placement
- Semi-final result: Failed to qualify (20th)

Participation chronology

Switzerland was represented at the Eurovision Song Contest 2007 with the song "Vampires Are Alive", written by René Baumann and Axel Breitung, and performed by Baumann himself under his stage name DJ BoBo. The Swiss participating broadcaster, the Swiss Broadcasting Corporation (SRG SSR), internally selected its entry for the contest. DJ BoBo was announced in December 2006, and the song was presented to the public on 21 February 2007.

Switzerland competed in the semi-final of the Eurovision Song Contest which took place on 10 May 2007. Performing during the show in position 8, "Vampires Are Alive" was not announced among the top 10 entries of the semi-final and therefore did not qualify to compete in the final. It was later revealed that Switzerland placed twentieth out of the 28 participating countries in the semi-final with 40 points.

== Background ==
Prior to the 2007 contest, the Swiss Broadcasting Corporation (SRG SSR) had participated in the Eurovision Song Contest representing Switzerland forty-seven times since its first entry in 1956. It won that first edition of the contest with the song "Refrain" performed by Lys Assia. Its second victory was achieved in 1988 with the song "Ne partez pas sans moi" performed by Canadian singer Céline Dion. Following the introduction of semi-finals for the 2004, Switzerland had managed to participate in the final two times up to this point. In 2005, the internal selection of the song "Cool Vibes" performed by Estonian girl band Vanilla Ninja, qualified Switzerland to the final where they placed 8th. Due to their successful result in 2005, Switzerland was pre-qualified to compete directly in the final in 2006 when "If We All Give a Little" by six4one placed 16th.

As part of its duties as participating broadcaster, SRG SSR organises the selection of its entry in the Eurovision Song Contest and broadcasts the event in the country. The broadcaster confirmed its intentions to participate at the 2007 contest on 11 July 2006. Along with its participation confirmation, SRG SSR also announced that it would internally select its entry for the 2007 contest. The broadcaster has selected its entry for the Eurovision Song Contest through both national finals and internal selections in the past. Since 2005, it had internally selected its entry for the competition.

== Before Eurovision ==
=== Internal selection ===
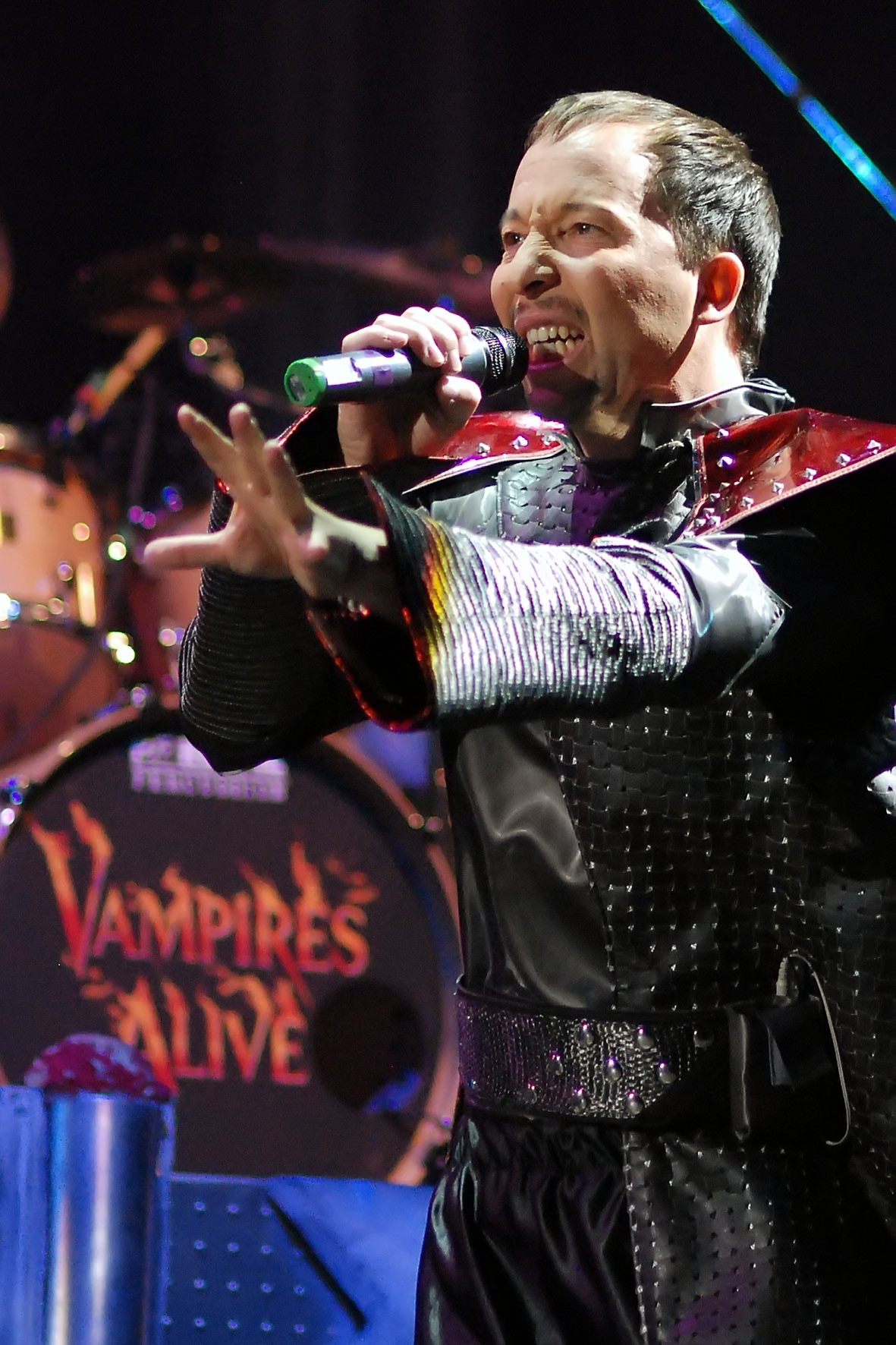
DJ BoBo was internally selected to represent Switzerland in the Eurovision Song Contest 2007

On 11 July 2006, SRG SSR opened a submission period for interested artists and composers to submit their entries until 30 November 2006. Eligible artists were those that have had television and stage experience (live performances), have made at least one video and have released at least one CD which placed among the top 50 in an official chart. In addition to the public submission, the broadcaster was also in contact with individual composers and lyricists as well as the music industry to be involved in the selection process.

On 14 December 2006, SRG SSR announced that it had selected DJ BoBo to represent Switzerland at the Eurovision Song Contest 2007. "Vampires Are Alive" was presented to the public as the song on 21 February 2007 via the release of the official music video. Both the artist and song were selected from over 60 entry submissions by a jury panel consisting of representatives of the three broadcasters in Switzerland: the Swiss-German broadcaster Schweizer Fernsehen (SF), the Swiss-French broadcaster Télévision Suisse Romande (TSR) and the Swiss-Italian broadcaster Televisione svizzera di lingua italiana (TSI), as well as the music channel VIVA Switzerland. "Vampires Are Alive" was written by René Baumann (DJ BoBo) together with Axel Breitung, and features uncredited vocals by Kimia Scarlett.

=== Controversy ===
"Vampires Are Alive" was met with concern from Christian parties in Switzerland due to the song lyrics which may encourage satanism and suicidal tendencies. SRG SSR later issued a statement assuring that they will not be recommending DJ BoBo to change the song as young people will not misunderstand the lyrics.

=== Promotion ===
DJ BoBo specifically promoted "Vampires Are Alive" as the Swiss Eurovision entry on 28 February 2007 by performing the song during the Greek Eurovision national final. In addition to the international appearance, DJ BoBo also performed the song during the SF1 show Benissimo on 10 March.

== At Eurovision ==
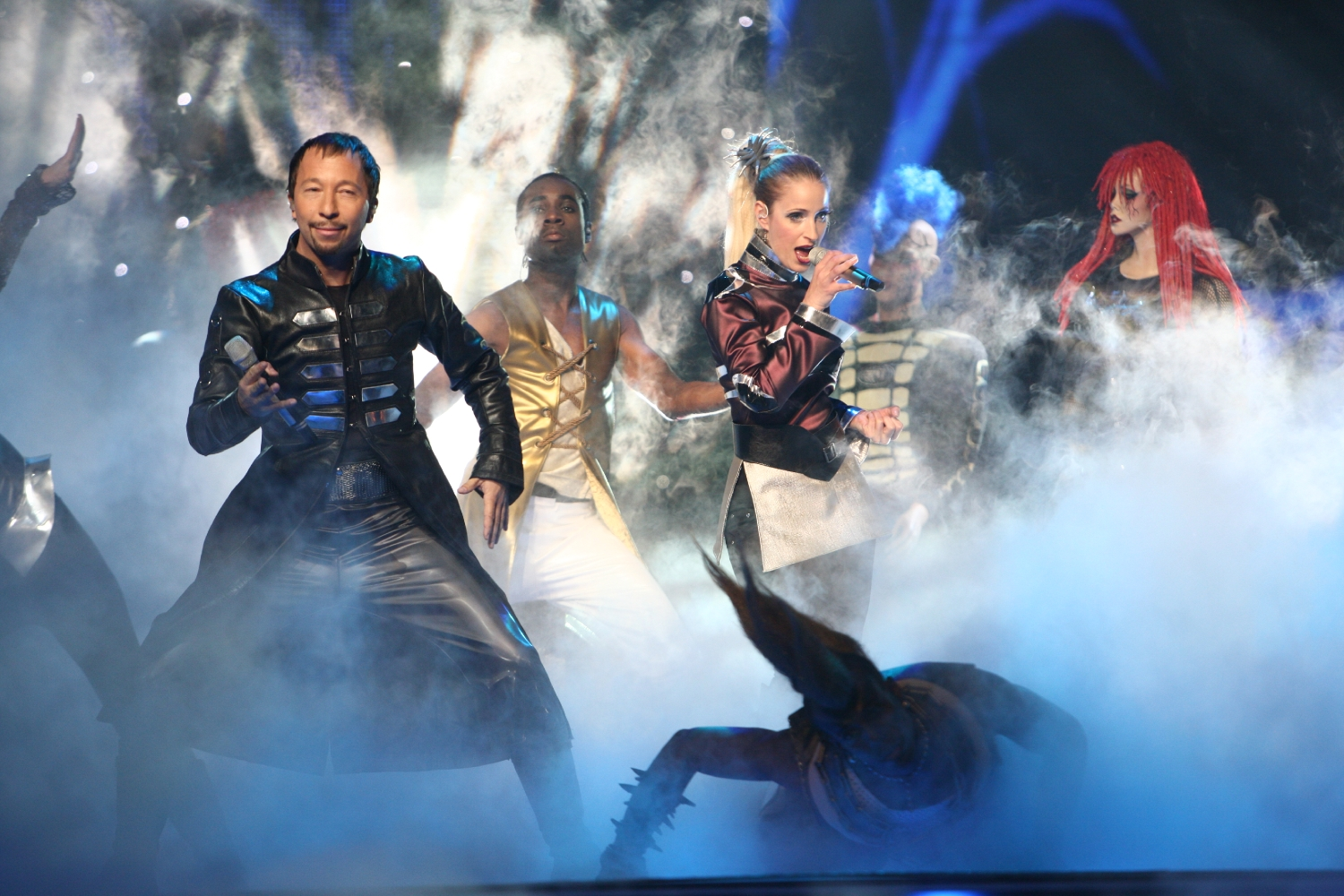
DJ BoBo performing at the Eurovision Song Contest

According to Eurovision rules, all nations with the exceptions of the host country, the "Big Four" (France, Germany, Spain, and the United Kingdom) and the ten highest placed finishers in the 2006 contest are required to qualify from the semi-final on 10 May 2007 in order to compete for the final on 12 May 2007. On 12 March 2007, a special allocation draw was held which determined the running order for the semi-final and Switzerland was set to perform in position 8, following the entry from Montenegro and before the entry from Moldova.

In Switzerland, three broadcasters that form SRG SSR aired the contest. Bernard Thurnheer provided German commentary both shows airing on SF zwei. Jean-Marc Richard provided French commentary on TSR 2 together with Nicolas Tanner for the semi-final and Henri Dès for the final. Sandy Altermatt and Claudio Lazzarino provided Italian commentary for the semi-final on TSI 2 and the final on TSI 1. SRG SSR appointed Sven Epiney as its spokesperson to announce the Swiss votes during the final.

=== Semi-final ===
DJ BoBo took part in technical rehearsals on 4 and 6 May, followed by dress rehearsals on 9 and 10 May. The Swiss performance featured DJ BoBo performing on stage in a black leather outfit together with vocalist Kimia Scarlett and four dancers. The stage featured several human models and LED screens displayed flying bats and lightning. The performance also featured several effects including smoke and fireworks. The dancers that joined DJ BoBo were: Anthony Moriah, Kurt Burger, Nicole Ganzhorn and Renick Bernadina.

At the end of the show, Switzerland was not announced among the top 10 entries in the semi-final and therefore failed to qualify to compete in the final. It was later revealed that Switzerland placed twentieth in the semi-final, receiving a total of 40 points.

=== Voting ===
Below is a breakdown of points awarded to Switzerland and awarded by Switzerland in the semi-final and grand final of the contest. The nation awarded its 12 points to Serbia in the semi-final and the final of the contest.

==== Points awarded to Switzerland ====
Points awarded to Switzerland (Semi-final)
Score	Country
12 points	
10 points	Malta
8 points	Germany
7 points	
6 points	Andorra
5 points	
4 points	Latvia
3 points	Denmark
2 points	Cyprus; Estonia; Greece; Slovenia
1 point	Croatia

==== Points awarded by Switzerland ====
Points awarded by Switzerland (Semi-final)
Score	Country
12 points	Serbia
10 points	Turkey
8 points	Portugal
7 points	Albania
6 points	Macedonia
5 points	Croatia
4 points	Hungary
3 points	Austria
2 points	Latvia
1 point	Netherlands

Points awarded by Switzerland (Final)
Score	Country
12 points	Serbia
10 points	Turkey
8 points	Bosnia and Herzegovina
7 points	Germany
6 points	Macedonia
5 points	Spain
4 points	Greece
3 points	Hungary
2 points	Ukraine
1 point	Finland
