= Bosnia and Herzegovina in the Eurovision Song Contest 2007 =

- Eurovision Song Contest 2007
- Participating broadcaster: Radio and Television of Bosnia and Herzegovina (BHRT)
- Country: Bosnia and Herzegovina
- Selection process: Internal selection
- Announcement date: Artist: 16 January 2007; Song: 4 March 2007

Competing entry
- Song: "Rijeka bez imena"
- Artist: Marija Šestić
- Songwriters: Aleksandra Milutinović; Goran Kovačić

Placement
- Final result: 11th, 106 points

Participation chronology

Bosnia and Herzegovina was represented at the Eurovision Song Contest 2007 with the song "Rijeka bez imena", written by Aleksandra Milutinović and Goran Kovačić, and performed by Marija Šestić. The Bosnian-Herzegovinian participating broadcaster, Radio and Television of Bosnia and Herzegovina (BHRT), internally selected its entry for the contest. On 16 January 2007, BHRT revealed that it had internally selected Marija Šestić to compete at the 2007 contest. Her song, "Rijeka bez imena", was presented to the public during a show entitled BH Eurosong 2007 on 4 March 2007.

As one of the ten highest placed finishers in 2006, Bosnia and Herzegovina automatically qualified to compete in the final of the Eurovision Song Contest. Performing as the opening entry for the show in position 1, Bosnia and Herzegovina placed eleventh out of the 24 participating countries with 106 points.

== Background ==
Prior to the 2007 contest, Radio and Television of Bosnia and Herzegovina (BHRT) and its predecessor national broadcasters, had participated in the Eurovision Song Contest representing Bosnia and Herzegovina twelve times since RTVBiH's first entry in 1993. Their best placing in the contest was third, achieved in 2006 with the song "Lejla" performed by Hari Mata Hari. Following the introduction of semi-finals for the 2004 contest, Bosnia and Herzegovina has, up to this year, managed to qualify on each occasion the nation has participated and compete in the final. Their least successful result has been 22nd place, which they have achieved in 1996.

As part of its duties as participating broadcaster, BHRT organises the selection of its entry in the Eurovision Song Contest and broadcasts the event in the country. The broadcaster confirmed its intentions to participate at the 2007 contest on 2 November 2006. In 2005, BHRT had set up a national final to choose both the artist and song to represent the nation, while it internally selected its entry in 2006. The internal selection procedure was continued for its 2007 entry.

== Before Eurovision ==
=== Internal selection ===
BHRT directly invited composers to submit songs in one of the official languages of Bosnia and Herzegovina up until 29 December 2006. Approximately 30 submissions were received at the closing of the deadline and on 16 January 2007, BHRT announced during a press conference that they had internally selected Marija Šestić to represent Bosnia and Herzegovina in Helsinki. Šestić previously attempted to represent Bosnia and Herzegovina in 2005, placing fourth in the national final with the song "In This World". The seven-member selection committee that determined Šestić and the song to be performed at the contest, which was written by Aleksandra Milutinović and Goran Kovačić, consisted of members of the Bosnian-Herzegovinian Delegation for the Eurovision Song Contest: Dejan Kukrić, Ivan Stojanović, Ninoslav Verber, Maja Čengić, Nermin Durmo, Milkica Grubor and Slaviša Mašić.

The song, "Rijeka bez imena", was presented during a television special entitled BH Eurosong Show 2007 on 4 March 2007, which was held at the Sarajevo National Theatre and hosted by Dejan Kukrić and Maja Čengić. The show was broadcast on BHT 1. In addition to the presentation of the song, the show featured guest performances by Croatian singer Petar Grašo, Danijela Martinović (who represented Croatia in 1998), Dmitry Koldun (who would represent Belarus in 2007), Karolina Gočeva (who represented Macedonia in 2002 and would represent Macedonia in 2007), and Alenka Gotar (who would represent Slovenia in 2007). An English language version, Russian language version, and Serbian language version of the song were prepared, with the song being performed in Serbian at the Eurovision Song Contest. "Rijeka bez imena" was the first song performed entirely in Serbian that was selected to represent Bosnia and Herzegovina at the Eurovision Song Contest.

=== Promotion ===
Marija Šestić made several appearances across Europe to specifically promote "Rijeka bez imena" as the Bosnian-Herzegovinian Eurovision entry. Marija Šestić took part in promotional activities in Serbia where she performed "Rijeka bez imena" during the final of the Serbian national final, Beovizija 2007, on 8 March and appeared in the RTV Pink programme Da predjemo na ti on 26 March. On 1 April, Šestić appeared in and performed during the TVS 1 programme Spet doma in Slovenia. Between 13 and 15 April, Šestić performed during the Songfestivalparty event which was held in Belgium at the D-Club and Popi Café venue in Antwerp and at the Le You venue in Brussels, as well as appearing during the RTL 4 programme Life & Cooking in the Netherlands. She also completed promotional activities in Croatia, Finland, Macedonia and Russia which included several television and radio appearances.

== At Eurovision ==
According to Eurovision rules, all nations with the exceptions of the host country, the "Big Four" (France, Germany, Spain, and the United Kingdom) and the ten highest placed finishers in the 2006 contest are required to qualify from the semi-final in order to compete for the final; the top ten countries from the semi-final progress to the final. As one of the ten highest placed finishers in the 2006 contest, Bosnia and Herzegovina automatically qualified to compete in the final on 12 May 2007. In addition to their participation in the final, Bosnia and Herzegovina is also required to broadcast and vote in the semi-final on 10 May 2007.

The semi-final and the final were broadcast in Bosnia and Herzegovina on BHT 1 with commentary by Dejan Kukrić. BHRT appointed Vesna Andree-Zaimović as its spokesperson to announce the Bosnian-Herzegovinian votes during the final.

=== Final ===
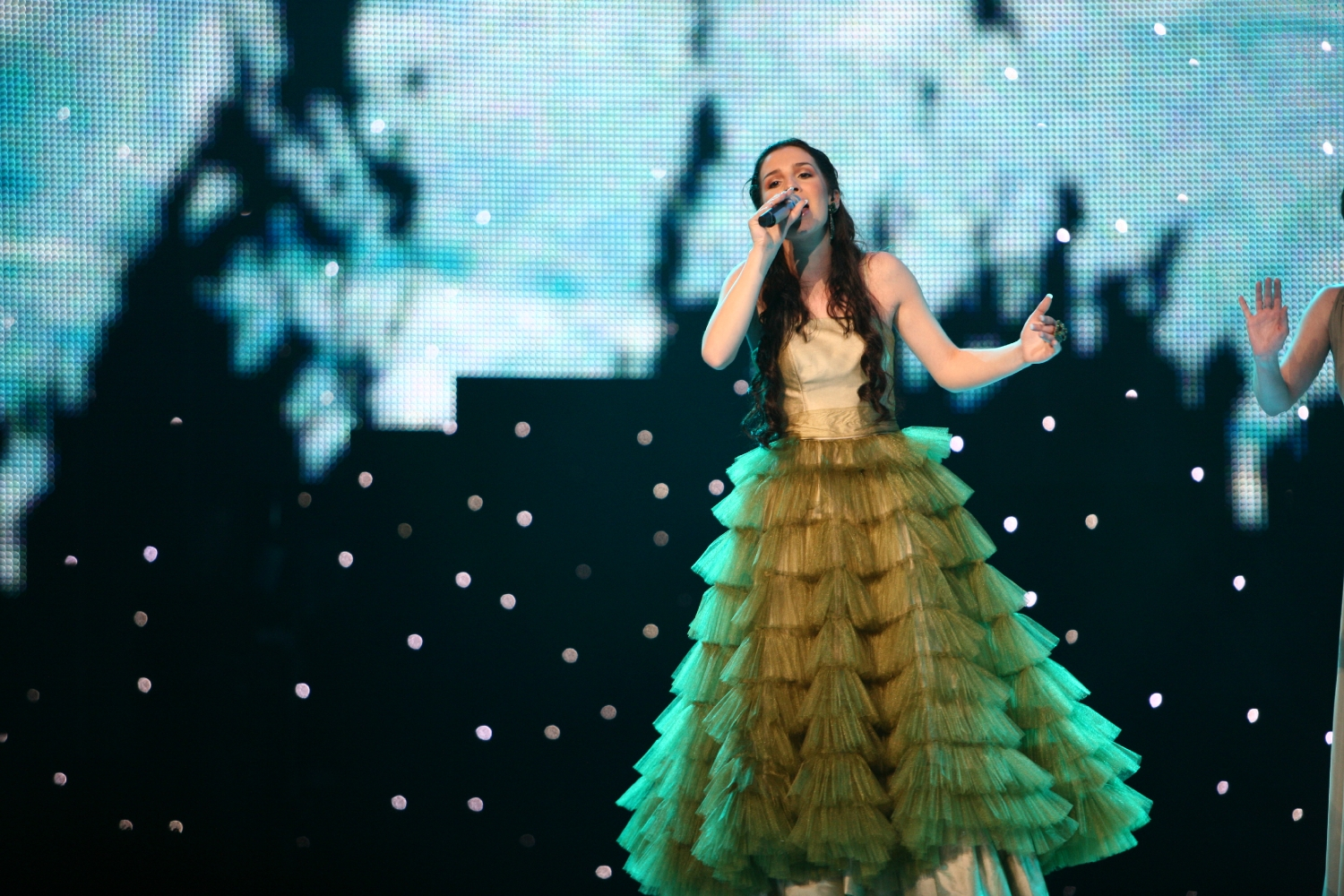
Marija Šestić performing during the final

Marija Šestić took part in technical rehearsals on 7 and 8 May, followed by dress rehearsals on 11 and 12 May. During the running order draw for the semi-final and final on 12 March 2007, Bosnia and Herzegovina was placed to perform in position 1 in the final, before the entry from Spain.

The Bosnian-Herzegovinian performance featured Marija Šestić joined on stage by a male tambura player and four female backing vocalists. As the performance progressed, the tambura player came forward from the back of the stage to kneel before Šestić, the latter who fell into his arms. The stage lighting displayed electric blue colours which transitioned to red, while the LED screens displayed stars which transitioned to faded aqua clouds and ultimately an orange lava river. The mustard dress for Marija Šestić was designed by Verica Rakočević. The tambura player that joined Marija Šestić was Aleksandar Sedlar Bogoev, while the four backing vocalists were: Danijela Večerinović, Dunja Galineo Kajević, Jelena Majić and Marina Đurović. Bosnia and Herzegovina placed eleventh in the final, scoring 106 points.

=== Voting ===
Below is a breakdown of points awarded to Bosnia and Herzegovina and awarded by Bosnia and Herzegovina in the semi-final and grand final of the contest. Both in the semi-final and the final of the contest, Bosnia and Herzegovina awarded its 12 points to fellow Balkan nation and contest winner Serbia.

==== Points awarded to Bosnia and Herzegovina ====
Points awarded to Bosnia and Herzegovina (Final)
Score	Country
12 points	
10 points	Croatia; Turkey
8 points	Albania; Austria; Serbia; Slovenia; Switzerland
7 points	Denmark; Montenegro; Netherlands
6 points	Norway; Sweden
5 points	
4 points	Czech Republic; Macedonia
3 points	Germany
2 points	
1 point	Armenia; France

==== Points awarded by Bosnia and Herzegovina ====
Points awarded by Bosnia and Herzegovina (Semi-final)
Score	Country
12 points	Serbia
10 points	Croatia
8 points	Turkey
7 points	Macedonia
6 points	Slovenia
5 points	Montenegro
4 points	Albania
3 points	Bulgaria
2 points	Belarus
1 point	Hungary

Points awarded by Bosnia and Herzegovina (Final)
Score	Country
12 points	Serbia
10 points	Turkey
8 points	Macedonia
7 points	Slovenia
6 points	Bulgaria
5 points	Ukraine
4 points	Belarus
3 points	Greece
2 points	Russia
1 point	Georgia

=== Viewing figures ===
The Eurovision Song Contest 2007 was the most watched television broadcast of 2007 in Bosnia and Herzegovina, with 46,4% share.
