= Ukraine in the Eurovision Song Contest 2007 =

- Eurovision Song Contest 2007
- Participating broadcaster: National Television Company of Ukraine (NTU)
- Country: Ukraine
- Selection process: Yevrobachennia 2007 – Natsionalnyi vidbir
- Selection date: 9 March 2007

Competing entry
- Song: "Dancing Lasha Tumbai"
- Artist: Verka Serduchka
- Songwriters: Andriy Danylko

Placement
- Final result: 2nd, 235 points

Participation chronology

Ukraine was represented at the Eurovision Song Contest 2007 with the song "Dancing Lasha Tumbai", written and performed by Andriy Danylko under the drag stage persona Verka Serduchka. The Ukrainian participating broadcaster, the National Television Company of Ukraine (NTU), organised a national final in order to select its entry for the contest. Seven entries competed in the national selection held on 9 March 2007 and "Danzing" performed by Verka Serduchka was selected as the winner following the combination of votes from a five-member jury panel and a public televote. The song was later retitled as "Dancing Lasha Tumbai". The Ukrainian entry caused controversy due to Serduchka being a drag performer as well as alleged political references in the song.

As one of the ten highest placed finishers in 2006, Ukraine automatically qualified to compete in the final of the Eurovision Song Contest. Performing during the show in position 18, Ukraine placed second out of the 24 participating countries with 235 points.

== Background ==
Prior to the 2007 contest, the National Television Company of Ukraine (NTU) had participated in the Eurovision Song Contest representing Ukraine four times since its first entry in 2003, winning the contest in 2004 with the song "Wild Dances" performed by Ruslana. Following the introduction of semi-finals for the 2004 contest, Ukraine had managed to qualify to final in every contest they participated in thus far. Its least successful result had been 19th place, achieved in 2005, with the song "Razom nas bahato" performed by GreenJolly.

As part of its duties as participating broadcaster, NTU organises the selection of its entry in the Eurovision Song Contest and broadcasts the event in the country. The broadcaster confirmed its intentions to participate at the 2007 contest on 19 January 2006. In the past, NTU had alternated between both internal selections and national finals in order to select the Ukrainian entry. In 2005 and 2006, NTU had set up national finals with several artists to choose both the song and performer, with both the public and a panel of jury members involved in the selection. Despite NTU initially announced that it would internally select its entry, it ultimately organised a national final.

== Before Eurovision ==
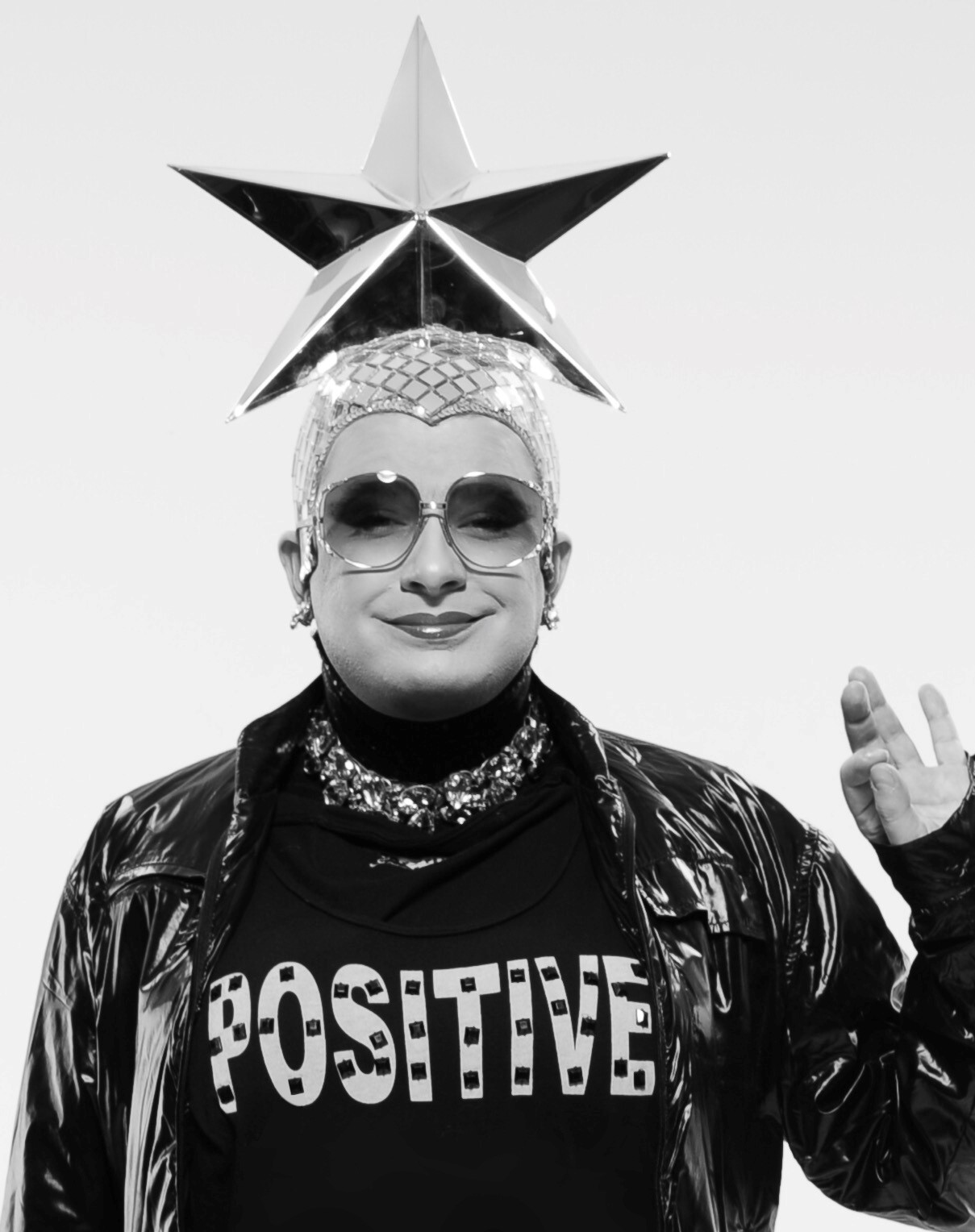
Verka Serduchka was selected to represent Ukraine in the Eurovision Song Contest 2007

=== Yevrobachennia 2007 – Natsionalnyi vidbir ===
The Ukrainian national final took place on 9 March 2007 at the NTU Studios in Kyiv. The show was hosted by Maria Orlova and Timur Miroshnychenko and broadcast on Pershyi Natsionalnyi.

==== Format ====
The selection of the competing entries for the national final and ultimately the Ukrainian Eurovision entry took place over two stages. In the first stage, artists and songwriters had the opportunity to apply for the competition through an online submission form. Eight acts were selected and announced on 13 February 2007, one of them which was later withdrawn. The second stage was the televised final, which took place on 9 March 2007 and featured the remaining seven acts vying to represent Ukraine in Helsinki. The winner was selected via the 50/50 combination of votes from a public televote and an expert jury. Both the public televote and the expert jury assigned scores ranging from 1 (lowest) to 7 (highest) and the entry that had the highest number of points following the combination of these scores was declared the winner. Viewers participating in the public televote during the show had the opportunity to submit their votes for the participating entries via telephone or SMS. In the event of a tie, the tie was decided in favour of the entry that received the highest score from the jury.

==== Competing entries ====
Artists and composers had the opportunity to submit their entries via an online submission form which accepted entries between 24 January 2007 and 10 February 2007. A five-member selection panel consisting of Volodymyr Hryshko (opera singer), Svyatoslav Vlokh (President of the World Dance Sport Federation), Oksana Novytska (Vice President of the Confederation of Designers and Stylists of Ukraine), Olena Mozgova (director of music and entertainment at NTU) and Vitaliy Dokalenko (general director of NTU) reviewed the 18 received submissions and shortlisted eight entries to compete in the national final. On 13 February 2007, the eight selected competing acts were announced. On 22 February 2007, Vitaliy Kozlovskiy withdrew from the national final due to disagreements with the format of the competition.

Artist	Song	Songwriter(s)
Aviator	"Angely" (Ангелы)	Andriy Storozh, Dmytro Todoriuk, Ihor Voevutskyi
Evgenia Vlasova	"I Will Be (Ya budu)" (Я буду)	Maxim Fadeev
Godo	"Stolen Rain"	Serhiy Bilousov, Viktor Kozyryev, Ihor Syrovatchenko
neAngely	"Ya znayu, eto ty" (Я знаю, это ты)	Toria Tal, Diana Golde
Olena Hrebenyuk	"Zla bol'she net" (Зла больше нет)	Olena Hrebenyuk
Vasil Bondarchuk	"Serebrom" (Серебром)	Gennady Krupnik, Diana Golde
Verka Serduchka	"Danzing"	Andriy Danylko

==== Final ====
The final took place on 9 March 2007. Seven entries competed and the winner, "Danzing" performed by Verka Serduchka, was selected through the combination of votes from a public televote and an expert jury. The jury panel consisted of Yan Tabachnyk (composer), Svyatoslav Vlokh (President of the World Dance Sport Federation), Oksana Novytska (Vice President of the Confederation of Designers and Stylists of Ukraine), Olena Mozgova (director of music and entertainment at NTU) and Vitaliy Dokalenko (general director of NTU). 17,597 votes were registered by the televote during the show. In addition to the performances of the competing entries, Irina Bilyk, Natalia Mohylevska, Oleksandr Ponomaryov (who represented Ukraine in 2003), Tina Karol (who represented Ukraine in 2006), Dmitry Koldun (who would represent Belarus in 2007), Olivia Lewis (who would represent Malta in 2007), The Jet Set (who would represent Poland in 2007), and Todomondo (who would represent Romania in 2007), performed as guests.

Final – 9 March 2007
R/O	Artist	Song	Jury	Televote				Total	Place
R/O	Artist	Song	Jury	Phone	SMS	Total	Points	Total	Place
1	Godo	"Stolen Rain"	1	142	779	921	2	3	7
2	Evgenia Vlasova	"I Will Be (Ya budu)"	6	499	4,069	4,568	6	12	2
3	Olena Hrebenyuk	"Zla bol'she net"	2	391	2,035	2,426	5	7	4
4	Verka Serduchka	"Danzing"	7	734	5,123	5,857	7	14	1
5	neAngely	"Ya znayu, eto ty"	4	47	536	683	1	5	6
6	Vasil Bondarchuk	"Serebrom"	5	176	1,997	2,173	4	9	3
7	Aviator	"Angely"	3	95	874	969	3	6	5

=== Controversy ===
The choice of Verka Serduchka, a drag performer, as the Ukrainian Eurovision representative was fiercely criticized by several media and politicians of different parties. Taras Chornovil of the Party of Regions stated: "I guess some of our esteemed experts saw those 'hot Finnish guys' dressed as monsters but didn't quite understand that there is subculture and there is pseudoculture. Those monsters are part of their subculture, which has the right to exist. But all these hermaphrodites have never been accepted anywhere. Therefore I think that this will be a serious embarrassment factor and the world will see us as complete idiots".

In addition, "Danzing" caused controversy due to the lyrics "Lasha Tumbai" being phonetically similar to "Russia goodbye", allegedly a reference to the Orange Revolution in Ukraine in 2004 and 2005. Serduchka claimed that "Lasha Tumbai" is a Mongolian phrase for "whipped cream", "milkshake" or "churned butter", although it was subsequently confirmed that there are no such words in Mongolian and that the catchphrase bears no meaning at all. Serduchka would later clarify that "Lasha Tumbai" was in fact meaningless and only chosen because she needed a rhyme for the song. "Danzing" was retitled as "Dancing Lasha Tumbai" for the Eurovision Song Contest.

== At Eurovision ==
According to Eurovision rules, all nations except the "Big Four" (France, Germany, Spain, and the United Kingdom), the host country, and the ten highest placed finishers in the 2006 contest are required to qualify from the semi-final in order to compete for the final; the top ten countries from the semi-final progress to the final. As one of the ten highest placed finishers in the 2006 contest, Ukraine automatically qualified to compete in the final on 12 May 2007. In addition to their participation in the final, Ukraine is also required to broadcast and vote in the semi-final on 10 May 2007. On 12 March 2007, a special allocation draw was held which determined the running order. As one of the three wildcard countries, Ukraine chose to perform in position 18 during the final, following the entry from Serbia and before the entry from the United Kingdom.

In Ukraine, both the semi-final and the final were broadcast on Pershyi Natsionalnyi with commentary by Timur Miroshnychenko. NTU appointed Kateryna Osadcha as its spokesperson to announce the Ukrainian votes during the final.

=== Final ===
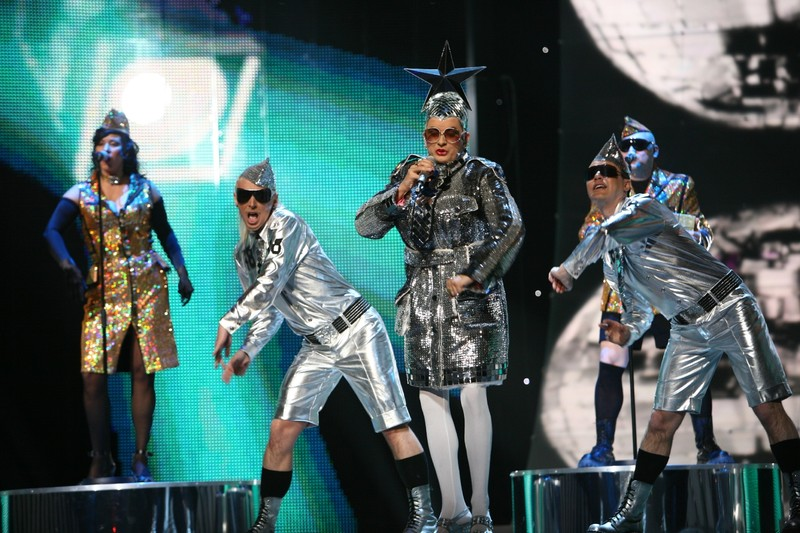
Verka Serduchka during a rehearsal before the final

Verka Serduchka took part in technical rehearsals on 7 and 8 May, followed by dress rehearsals on 11 and 12 May. The Ukrainian performance featured Verka Serduchka performing on stage in a silver costume as well as sunglasses and a silver star hat designed by Anzhela Lysytsia, together with two dancers dressed in silver with military boots and tie and three backing vocalists, one of them which also played the accordion, dressed in gold and standing on raised platforms. The performers did a dance routine on a stage with flashing lights while disco balls and light projectors appeared on the LED screens. The two dancers that joined Verka Serduchka on stage were Sergey Ogurtsov and Tudor Zberea, while the three backing vocalists were Elena Romanovskaya, Natalia Gura-Golubovskaya and Vasily Goldakovskiy. Ukraine placed second in the final, scoring 235 points.

=== Voting ===
Below is a breakdown of points awarded to Ukraine and awarded by Ukraine in the semi-final and grand final of the contest. The nation awarded its 12 points to Belarus in the semi-final and the final of the contest.

==== Points awarded to Ukraine ====
Points awarded to Ukraine (Final)
Score	Country
12 points	Andorra; Czech Republic; Latvia; Poland; Portugal
10 points	Belarus; Georgia; Israel
8 points	Estonia; Ireland; Lithuania; Russia; United Kingdom
7 points	Greece; Moldova; Spain
6 points	Armenia; Finland; Iceland
5 points	Bosnia and Herzegovina; Croatia; Germany
4 points	Austria; Cyprus; France; Romania; Slovenia
3 points	Bulgaria; Denmark; Hungary; Malta; Serbia; Sweden; Turkey
2 points	Macedonia; Montenegro; Norway; Switzerland
1 point	Belgium; Netherlands

==== Points awarded by Ukraine ====
Points awarded by Ukraine (Semi-final)
Score	Country
12 points	Belarus
10 points	Georgia
8 points	Serbia
7 points	Slovenia
6 points	Moldova
5 points	Poland
4 points	Hungary
3 points	Latvia
2 points	Bulgaria
1 point	Turkey

Points awarded by Ukraine (Final)
Score	Country
12 points	Belarus
10 points	Russia
8 points	Georgia
7 points	Moldova
6 points	Serbia
5 points	Armenia
4 points	Slovenia
3 points	Bulgaria
2 points	Romania
1 point	Turkey
