= Kamara Ghedi =

Romanian singer

Kamara
- Born: Kamara Ghedi; February 19, 1976 (age 50)
- Origin: Bucharest, Romania
- Genres: Pop
- Occupation: Singer
- Instrument: Vocals

Kamara Ghedi (born February 19, 1976), known by his stage name Kamara, is a Romanian singer.

== Life ==
Born in Bucharest, Romania to a French Guinean father, Kamara is the member of the pop group Alb Negru. He is also of Greek descent. His grandfather was a Minister in French Guinea.

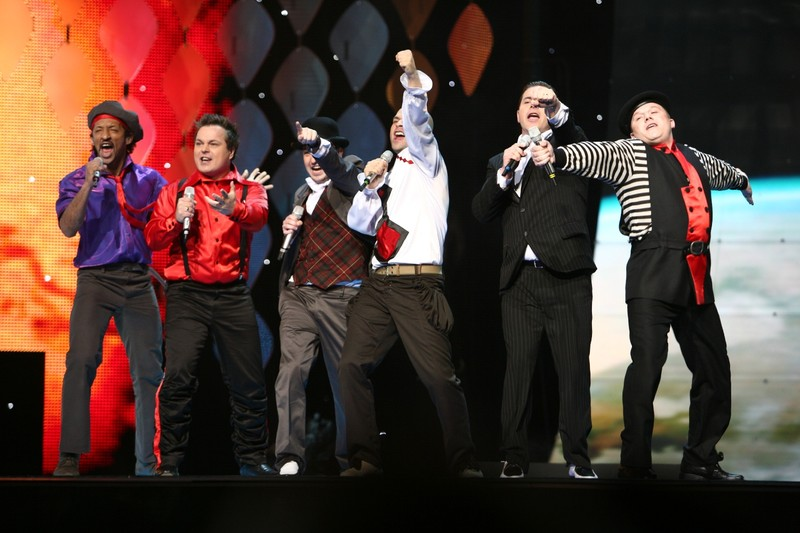
Kamara (left) with Todomondo at Eurovision Song Contest 2007 in Helsinki.

== Career ==
With Todomondo, he and Andrei Ștefănescu (Alb Negru band) represented Romania in the Eurovision Song Contest 2007 and placed 13th with the song "Liubi, Liubi, I Love You" which included lyrics in six different languages.

He played soccer in college for Universitatea Cluj-Napoca.

== Songs ==
- Noi doi – 2004
- Fără sens – 2005
- Lasă-te iubită – 2006
- Hello – 2006
- Fierbinte – 2007 (feat Andra)
- Kalimba – 2008
- Amintiri – 2009
- Charisma – 2010
- Magical – 2010
- Spotlight – 2011
- Mi-e sete de tine – 2012 (feat Ralflo & Rareș)
- Zile – 2012 (feat Ralflo & Rareș)
- Colegi de cameră – 2013
- Dubii – 2014
- Ia-ma asa – 2018
- Ela – 2018 (feat Ralflo & Rareș)
- Luna – 2019
- Pierzatori – 2020 (feat Ralflo & Rareș)
- Amandoi – 2020 (feat Ralflo & Rareș)
- Vremuri noi – 2020 (feat Ralflo & Rareș)
