= Tornerò =

Tornerò may refer to:

- "Tornerò" (Mihai Trăistariu song), 2006
- "Tornerò" (I Santo California song), 1974
