= Lora (singer) =

Laura Petrescu
- Also known as: Lora
- Born: Laura Petrescu; 23 July 1982 (age 43); Vaslui, Romania
- Genres: Pop, fusion
- Occupations: Singer, judge, model, celebrity
- Years active: 2006 – 2009 (in Wassabi); 2010 – present (solo)
- Labels: Media Pro Music

Laura Petrescu, better known as Lora (born in Vaslui, Romania on 23 July 1982) is a Romanian pop singer, model, judge on The Next Star show, and TV personality. Before her solo career, she was part of the Romanian band Wassabi.

== Beginnings ==
Lora graduated from Sfânta Maria high school in Galați and applied for Prima TV's Star Factory in 2004, she studied sociology at college but her music career didn't allow her to finish it.

In 2006, she became a founding member of Wassabi with a launching song named "Have Some Fun with Radio 21" becoming the signature tune of Radio 21 that year and taking part in the Selecţia Naţională Eurovision 2007 to represent Romania in the Eurovision Song Contest. The songs were "Do the Tango with Me" and "Crazy", the latter with band Morandi.

== Solo career ==
On 1 April 2009, Lora withdraws from the band for a solo career. After 8 months, Lora tried her hand at qualifying for Eurovision but now as a duo with Sonny Flame in the song "Come Along", coming 7th overall despite the popularity of the song.

Lora has collaborated with many acts including Sensor in the open concert of Faithless in Bucharest. with Phelipe in "Hot Spot" and in 2010 with Adrian Sîna of the band Akcent in "My Passion" with great success in Romania and internationally. The music video featured models Ana Stefanescu and Silviu Tolu. Lora released the song "No More Tears" with the help of Adrian Sîna also with an accompanying music video in 2011. Her song "Fall in Love Tonight" has also found international success.

In 2014 Lora receive an important offer from Media Pro Distribution, the singer provides the Romanian dub of Dorothy in Legends of Oz: Dorothy's Return.

== Singles / Videography ==
as part of Wassabi

- "Have Some Fun with Radio 21"
- "Și m-am îndragostit de tine"
- "Lonely Girl"
- "Don't Go Baby"

Solo album
"A voastră, Lora" (2017)

- "Asha"
- "Ne împotrivim"
- "Singuri in doi (Peter Pop feat. Lora)"
- "Floare la ureche"
- "Capu’ sus"
- "Lasă-mă așa (Akcent feat. Lora)"
- "Draga"
- "Puișor"
- "Bine mersi (Doddy feat. Lora)"
- "Rugă"
- "Sub stele (R.A.C.L.A. feat. Lora)"
- "Arde"
- "Fără el"
- "Puncte, puncte (Cortes feat. Lora)"
- "No More Tears"
- "Prin mulţime (Flavius feat. Lora)"
- "Sad Eyes"
- "Un vis"
- "Rebeli și nebuni"
- "C'est la vie (TWO feat. Lora)"

New single of Lora in collaboration with Doddy "Dor sa te ador" hits over 40 million views on YouTube in 2 months, a record of views in Romania and the incontestable SUMMER HIT OF 2018.

New singles from the announced second album "Despre Demoni Si Iertare" (About Demons and Forgiveness)

- "I know"
- "Lume"
- "Valul"
- "Ramas bun"
- "Cinci"
- "Pana In Rai"

== Filmography ==
Lora film appearances
Year	Title	Role	Credit	Ref.
2021	Pup-o, mă! 2: Mireasa nebună	Velvet	Actress	
