= Mihai Trăistariu =

Romanian singer

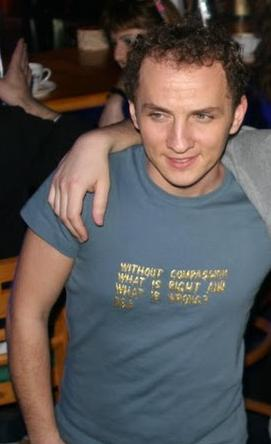
- Trăistariu in 2016

Background information
- Also known as: Mihai
- Born: 16 December 1976 (age 49); Piatra Neamț, Romania
- Genre: Dance-pop
- Occupations: Singer; songwriter
- Instruments: Vocals; piano
- Years active: 1998–present
- Labels: Warner; Roton Music
- Website: Official website

Mihai Trăistariu (Romanian pronunciation: [miˈhaj trəjstaˈri.u]; born on 16 December 1976 in Piatra Neamț, Romania), also known as simply Mihai (stylized as M I H A I or MIHAI), is a Romanian singer and songwriter. He is best known for representing Romania at the Eurovision Song Contest 2006 held in Athens, Greece, where he placed 4th with his song, "Tornerò". The track gained commercial success, selling over one million units worldwide and influencing the trajectory of Trăistariu's career.

== Career ==
Trăistariu comes from an artistic family. His father, Gheorghe Trăistariu, was a well-known painter of Piatra Neamț, while his mother, Natalia Trăistariu, studied medicine and sang in her youth. Trăistariu has three siblings: Geanina, Constantin and Vasile Trăistariu. All four play a musical instrument, with Mihai playing the piano. Trăistariu studied piano for 10 years with a private teacher and graduated from the Alexandru Ioan Cuza University in Iași with a double major in mathematics and informatics, as well as from the Theatre University in Constanța and the National College Petru Rareș in Piatra Neamț, but chose to pursue a music career. When he was 16 years old, Trăistariu began to take lessons in acting and directing with Romanian actor Corneliu Dan Borcia, the manager of Teatrul Tineretului, the Youth Theater in Piatra Neamț. He joined the jazz courses of the Student House in Iaşi, led by Romanian composer and teacher Romeo Cozma.

In 2006, Trăistariu was chosen to represent Romania in the Eurovision Song Contest 2006 with his song "Tornerò", placing fourth in the Grand Final.

=== Selecția Națională participations ===
Trăistariu has competed nine times in the Selecția Națională, a pre-selection show to select Romania's entrant for the Eurovision Song Contest. He won the competition in 2006, while placing second in 2017 and in 2000 with his then-band Valahia.

Year	Title	Place
2000	"Why" (as part of Valahia)	2nd
2002	"Mother" (as part of Valahia)	4th
2003	"Friends are Friends" (as part of Valahia)	3rd
2005	"All the Time" (with Nico)	3rd
2006	"Tornerò"	1st
2016	"Paradisio"	5th
2017	"I Won't Surrender"	2nd
2018	"Heaven"	7th
2019	"Baya"	Withdrew

== Discography ==
=== Studio albums ===
List of studio albums, with sales
Title	Album details	Sales
Altceva	Released: 2005; Format: CD	
Tornerò	Released: 2006; Format: CD	EUR: 250,000
Love	Released: 2009; Format: CD	
Lie, ciocârlie	Released: 2010; Format: CD	
Balade	Released: 2012; Format: CD	

=== Singles ===
==== As lead artist ====
List of singles as lead artist, with selected chart positions and sales
Title	Year	Peak chart positions				Sales	Album
Title	Year	ROM	FIN	GRE	SWE	Sales	Album
"Niciodată" (featuring LA)	1999	—	—	—	—		
"Cât de frumoasă eşti"	2004	96	—	—	—		Altceva
"Iţi dau"	2005	—	—	—	—		Altceva
"All the Time" (with Nico)	2005	—	—	—	—		
"Baby" (featuring Tiger One and Alin)	2005	—	—	—	—		
"Tornerò"	2006	38	8	4	21	WW: 1,000,000	
"Dimmi Si o No"	2007	—	—	—	—		Love
"Your Love Is High"	2008	—	—	—	—		Love
"Puerto Rico"	2009	—	—	—	—		Love
"Je t'aime"	2010	—	—	—	—		
"Lie, ciocârlie"	2010	—	—	—	—		
"Nu mai vreau iubire"	2012	—	—	—	—		
"It's Another Day"	2013	—	—	—	—		
"Only You" (featuring Costi Ioniță)	2013	—	—	—	—		
"Paradisio"	2016	—	—	—	—		
"Zombie Love"	2016	—	—	—	—		
"Iau vara la mișto"	2016	—	—	—	—		
"I Won't Surrender"	2017	—	—	—	—		
"Heaven"	2018	—	—	—	—		
"Baya"	2018	—	—	—	—		
"—" denotes a title that did not chart, or was not released in that territory.							

==== As featured artist ====
List of singles as featured artist
Title	Year
"Chop Chop" (En3rgy MC featuring Mihai Trăistariu)	2017
"Portobella" (En3rgy MC featuring Mihai Trăistariu)	2017

Awards and achievements
Preceded by Luminița Anghel and Sistem with "Let Me Try"	Romania in the Eurovision Song Contest; 2006	Succeeded by Todomondo with "Liubi, Liubi, I Love You"
