= Veronika (Romanian singer) =

Romanian singer (born 1984)

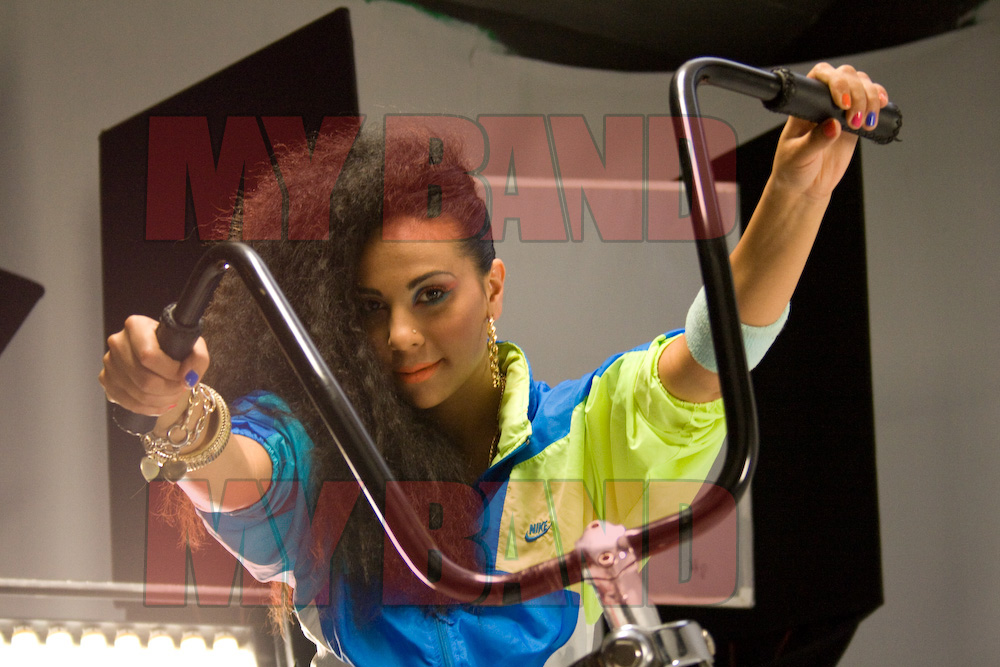

Background information
- Born: Veronica Alexandra Tecaru; January 14, 1984 (age 42); Galați, Romania
- Genres: R&B; soul; dance; club; hip hop
- Occupation: Singer
- Instrument: Vocals
- Years active: 2006–present
- Labels: Roton, Media Pro Music

Veronica Alexandra Tecaru (born January 14, 1984), known by her stage name Veronika, is a Romanian singer. Born in Galați, Tecaru turned to singing after giving up a career as a basketball player. She began her music career in Bucharest as a member of Wassabi in 2006. Following the disbandment of Wassabi in 2009, Tecaru pursued a solo career under the name Veronika. Associated acts include Brad Vee Johnson (national tour) and Julian M (2011-2012).
