= Eurovision Song Contest 2007 =

International song competition

Coordinates: 60°10′N 24°56′E

- True Fantasy

Dates and venue
- Semi-final: 10 May 2007
- Final: 12 May 2007
- Venue: Hartwall Areena; Helsinki, Finland

Organisation
- Organiser: European Broadcasting Union (EBU)
- Executive supervisor: Svante Stockselius

Production
- Host broadcaster: Yleisradio (YLE)
- Director: Timo Suomi
- Executive producer: Heikki Seppälä
- Presenters: Jaana Pelkonen; Mikko Leppilampi

Participants
- Number of entries: 42
- Number of finalists: 24
- Debuting countries: Czech Republic; Georgia; Montenegro; Serbia
- Returning countries: Austria; Hungary
- Non-returning countries: Monaco
- Participation map: Finalist countries Countries eliminated in the semi-final Countries that participated in the past but not in 2007

Vote
- Voting system: Each country awarded 12, 10, 8–1 point(s) to their 10 favourite songs.
- Winning song: Serbia; "Molitva"

The Eurovision Song Contest 2007 was the 52nd edition of the Eurovision Song Contest. It consisted of a semi-final on 10 May and a final on 12 May 2007, held at the Hartwall Areena in Helsinki, Finland, and presented by Jaana Pelkonen and Mikko Leppilampi. It was organised by the European Broadcasting Union (EBU) and host broadcaster Yleisradio (YLE), who staged the event after winning the 2006 contest for Finland with the song "Hard Rock Hallelujah" by Lordi. In addition, Krisse Salminen acted as guest presenter in the green room and reported from the crowds at the Senate Square.

Broadcasters from forty-two countries participated in the contest—three more than the previous record of thirty-nine that took part in 2005. The EBU decided to put aside its limit of 40 countries, which would have meant excluding some countries using a ranking order scheme. The Czech Republic and Georgia participated for the first time this year, with Montenegro and Serbia taking part as independent nations for the first time. Austria and Hungary both returned after their absence from the previous edition. Meanwhile, Monaco decided not to participate, despite initially confirming participation, and are yet to make a return to the contest.

The winner was Serbia with the song "Molitva", performed by Marija Šerifović and written by Vladimir Graić and Saša Milošević Mare. This was Serbia's first victory in the contest, coincidently the first year it competed as an independent nation, and the only instance of a country winning on debut, not counting the first contest. It was also the first winning song entirely performed in a country's native language since "Diva" for Israel in 1998. Ukraine, Russia, Turkey, and Bulgaria rounded out the top five. Further down the table, Belarus achieved their best placing to date, finishing sixth. Meanwhile, Ireland achieved its worst placing in the contest up until that point, finishing twenty-fourth (last place) in the final. Of the "Big Four" countries, Germany placed the highest, finishing nineteenth.

== Location ==
Locations of the candidate cities: the chosen host city is marked in blue, while the eliminated cities are marked in red.

Helsinki, the Finnish capital, was chosen as the host city, although other cities were in the running; the second-largest city of Espoo, the third-largest city of Tampere, and the city of Turku all submitted bids to host the contest alongside Kittilä, Lahti, and Rovaniemi. The choice of Helsinki was justified, among other things, by the requirements of the number of people and technology, as well as its superior flight and transport connections and accommodation capacity.

=== Venue ===
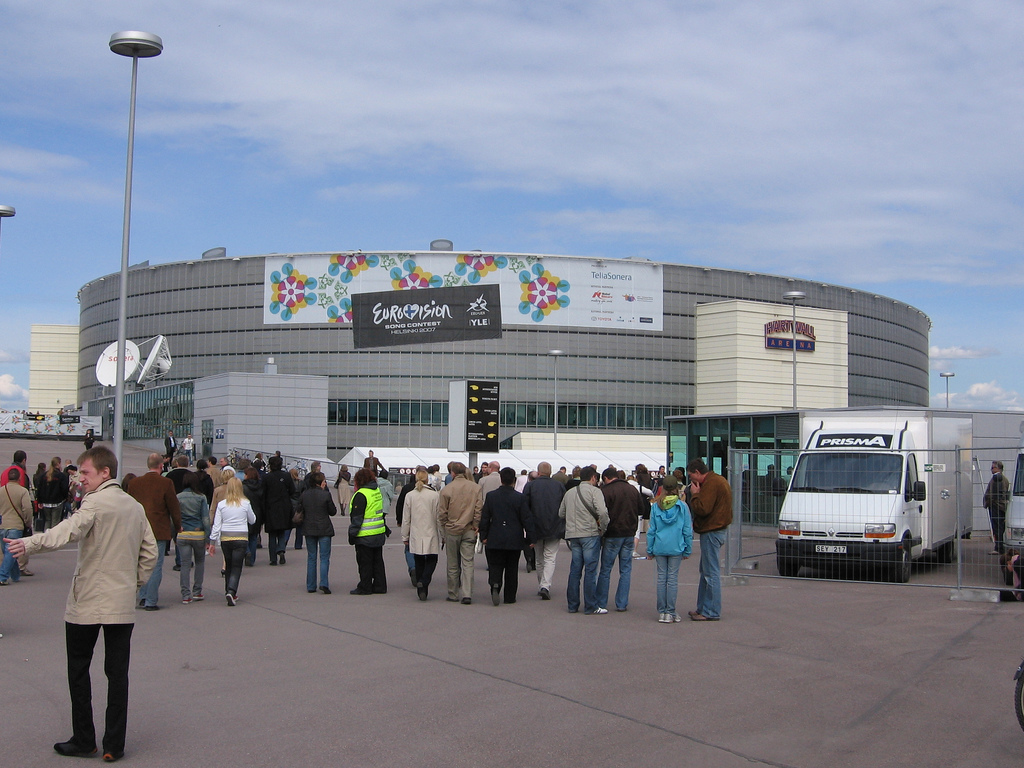
Hartwall Areena, Helsinki – host venue of the 2007 contest.

A total of 11 venues in seven locations applied for hosting rights. The known possible venues for the contest included LänsiAuto Areena in Espoo, Helsinki Ice Hall, Helsinki Fair Center, industrial workshop buildings at Pasilan konepaja in Helsinki, Lahden suurhalli in Lahti, Rovaniemi Lapland Arena, Pirkkahalli (main hall of Tampere Exhibition and Sports Centre), Tampere Ice Stadium and Turkuhalli.

In the end, Helsinki was chosen, with the host venue being the Hartwall Areena. The venue is a large multi-functional indoor arena, which opened in 1997, and can take some 12,000–15,000 spectators for concerts. Its name comes from its largest sponsor, the beverage company Hartwall, also based in Helsinki. For the contest, the arena was referred to as the Helsinki Arena.

== Format ==
On 12 March 2007, the draws for the running order for the semi-final, final and voting procedure took place. A new feature allowed five wild-card countries from the semi-final and three countries from the final to choose their starting position. The heads of delegation went on stage and chose the number they would take. In the semi-final, Austria, Andorra, Turkey, Slovenia, and Latvia were able to choose their positions. In the final, Armenia, Ukraine, and Germany were able to exercise this privilege. All countries opted for spots in the second half of both evenings. Shortly after the draw, the entries were approved by the European Broadcasting Union (EBU). The United Kingdom chose its entry after the deadline because they were granted special dispensation from the EBU.

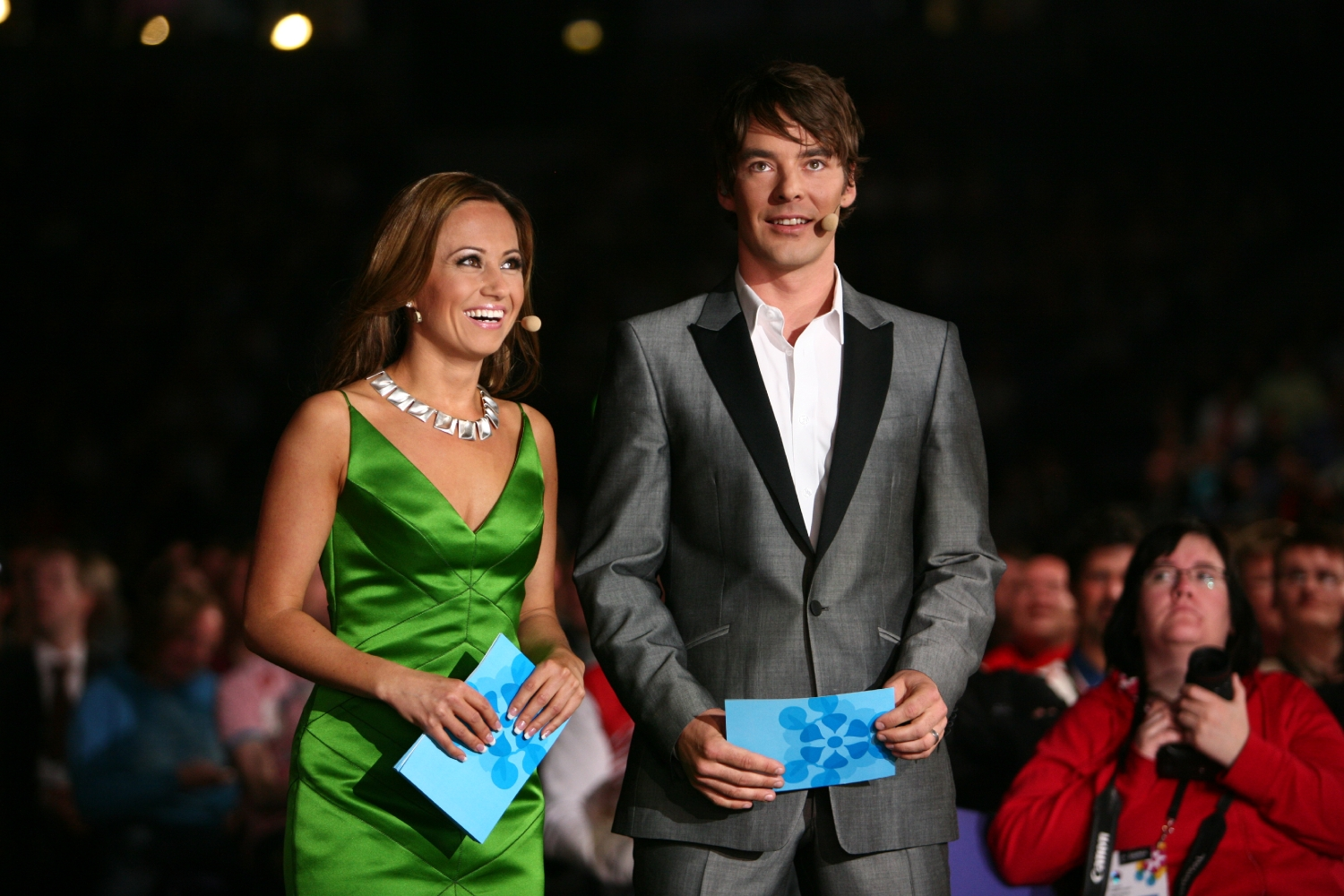
The hosts Jaana Pelkonen and Mikko Leppilampi

The contest saw some minor changes to the voting time-frame. The recap, a compilation summary video of all entries including phone numbers, was shown twice. The voting process was the same as 2006 except there was fifteen minutes to vote, an increase of five minutes on the 2006 contest. In the final, the results from each country were once again shown from one to seven points automatically on screen and only eight, ten and twelve were read by the spokespeople. For the first time, the winner was awarded a promotion tour around Europe, visiting Denmark, Spain, Sweden, the Netherlands, Greece, and Germany. The tour was held between 16 May and 21 May. The event was sponsored by Nordic communications group TeliaSonera, and — as with several previous contests — Nobel Biocare. Apocalyptica were the interval act, and played a medley of songs: Worlds Collide, Faraway and finally Life Burns!, but without the usual lyrics.

=== Visual design ===
The official logo of the contest remained the same as 2006; the flag in the centre of the heart was changed to the Finnish flag. The EBU and Yle announced that the theme for the 2007 contest would be "True Fantasy", which embraced Finland and "Finnishness" in terms of the polarities associated with the country. The design agency Dog Design was responsible for the design of the visual theme of the contest which incorporated vibrant kaleidoscopic patterns formed from various symbols including exclamation marks and the letter F. The stage was in the shape of a kantele, a traditional Finnish instrument. On 20 February 2007 a reworked official website for the contest was launched marking the first public exhibition of this year's theme.

The shows were produced and broadcast in high-definition for the first time, following tests at the previous edition.

An official CD and DVD as well as an official fan book were released. The themes of the postcards (short videos between the acts) were short stories occurring in different Finnish landmarks.

== Participants ==
Eurovision Song Contest 2007 – Participation summaries by country
- Albania; Andorra; Armenia; Austria; Belarus; Belgium; Bosnia and Herzegovina; Bulgaria; Croatia; Cyprus; Czech Republic; Denmark; Estonia; Finland; France; Georgia; Germany; Greece; Hungary; Iceland; Ireland; Israel; Latvia; Lithuania; Macedonia; Malta; Moldova; Montenegro; Netherlands; Norway; Poland; Portugal; Romania; Russia; Serbia; Slovenia; Spain; Sweden; Switzerland; Turkey; Ukraine; United Kingdom

Participating broadcasters in a Eurovision Song Contest must be active members of the EBU. The broadcasters from 42 countries submitted preliminary applications. Although in previous years the maximum number of participating countries was 40, the EBU allowed all 42 to participate in 2007. The Czech Republic, Serbia, Montenegro, and Georgia all entered the contest for the first time in 2007. Monaco announced its non-participation on 12 December 2006, and the EBU announced the final lineup of 42 countries on 15 December 2006.

Several of the performing artists had previously represented the same country in past editions: Evridiki had represented Cyprus in 1992 and in 1994, and provided backing vocals in 1983 and in 1987; Karolina had represented Macedonia in 2002; and Edsilia Rombley had represented the Netherlands in 1998. In addition Eiríkur Hauksson representing Iceland, had represented Iceland in 1986 as member of ICY and Norway in 1991 as part of Just 4 Fun.

Eurovision Song Contest 2007 participants
Country	Broadcaster	Artist	Song	Language	Songwriter(s)
Albania	RTSH	Frederik Ndoci	"Hear My Plea"	English, Albanian	Adrian Hila; Pandi Laço
Andorra	RTVA	Anonymous	"Salvem el món"	Catalan, English	Niki Francesca; Guillem Gallego; Alejandro Martínez
Armenia	AMPTV	Hayko	"Anytime You Need"	English, Armenian	Hayk Hakobyan; Karen Kavaleryan
Austria	ORF	Eric Papilaya	"Get a Life – Get Alive"	English	Austin Howard; Greg Usek
Belarus	BTRC	Koldun	"Work Your Magic"	English	Karen Kavaleryan; Philipp Kirkorov
Belgium	RTBF	The KMG's	"LovePower"	English	Wakas Ashiq; Paul Curtiz
Bosnia and Herzegovina	BHRT	Marija Šestić	"Rijeka bez imena" (Ријека без имена)	Serbian	Goran Kovačić; Aleksandra Milutinović
Bulgaria	BNT	Elitsa Todorova & Stoyan Yankoulov	"Water"	Bulgarian	Elitsa Todorova; Stoyan Yankoulov
Croatia	HRT	Dragonfly feat. Dado Topić	"Vjerujem u ljubav"	Croatian, English	Dado Topić
Cyprus	CyBC	Evridiki	"Comme ci, comme ça"	French	Dimitris Korgialas; Poseidonas Yiannopoulos
Czech Republic	ČT	Kabát	"Malá dáma"	Czech	Radek Hurčík; Tomáš Krulich; Milan Špalek; Ota Váňa; Josef Vojtek
Denmark	DR	DQ	"Drama Queen"	English	Peter Andersen; Claus Christensen; Simon Munk
Estonia	ETV	Gerli Padar	"Partners in Crime"	English	Hendrik Sal-Saller; Berit Vaher
Finland	Yle	Hanna Pakarinen	"Leave Me Alone"	English	Miikka Huttunen; Hanna Pakarinen; Martti Vuorinen
France	France Télévisions	Les Fatals Picards	"L'Amour à la française"	French, English ("Franglais")	Ivan Callot; Yves Giraud; Laurent Honel; Paul Léger; Jean-Marc Sauvagnargues
Georgia	GPB	Sopho	"Visionary Dream"	English	Beqa Japaridze; Bibi Kvachadze
Germany	NDR (Note: On behalf of the German public broadcasting consortium ARD)	Roger Cicero	"Frauen regier'n die Welt"	German, English	Matthias Haß; Frank Ramond
Greece	ERT	Sarbel	"Yassou Maria" (Γειά σου Μαρία)	English	Marcus Englöf; Alex Papaconstantinou; Markus Sepehrmanesh
Hungary	MTV	Magdi Rúzsa	"Unsubstantial Blues"	English	Imre Mózsik; Magdolna Rúzsa
Iceland	RÚV	Eiríkur Hauksson	"Valentine Lost"	English	Peter Fenner; Sveinn Rúnar Sigurðsson
Ireland	RTÉ	Dervish	"They Can't Stop the Spring"	English	Tommy Moran; John Waters
Israel	IBA	Teapacks	"Push the Button"	English, French, Hebrew	Kobi Oz
Latvia	LTV	Bonaparti.lv	"Questa notte"	Italian	Kjell Jennstig; Francesca Russo; Torbjörn Wassenius
Lithuania	LRT	4Fun	"Love or Leave"	English	Julija Ritčik
Macedonia	MRT	Karolina	"Mojot svet" (Мојот свет)	Macedonian, English	Grigor Koprov; Ognen Nedelkovski
Malta	PBS	Olivia Lewis	"Vertigo"	English	Gerard James Borg; Philip Vella
Moldova	TRM	Natalia Barbu	"Fight"	English	Alexandru Brașoveanu; Elena Buga
Montenegro	RTCG	Stevan Faddy	"'Ajde, kroči" ('Ајде, крочи)	Montenegrin	Slaven Knezović; Milan Perić
Netherlands	NOS	Edsilia Rombley	"On Top of the World"	English	Martin Gijzemijter; Maarten ten Hove; Tjeerd Oosterhuis
Norway	NRK	Guri Schanke	"Ven a bailar conmigo"	English	Thomas G:son
Poland	TVP	The Jet Set	"Time to Party"	English	Mateusz Krezan; David Junior Serame; Kamil Varen
Portugal	RTP	Sabrina	"Dança comigo"	Portuguese	Emanuel; Tó Maria Vinhas
Romania	TVR	Todomondo	"Liubi, Liubi, I Love You" (Люби, Люби, I Love You)	English, Italian, Spanish, Russian, French, Romanian	Vlad Crețu; Kamara Ghedi; Ciro de Luca; Valeriu Răileanu; Andrei Ștefănescu; Bogdan Tașcău
Russia	C1R	Serebro	"Song #1"	English	Daniil Babichev; Maxim Fadeev
Serbia	RTS	Marija Šerifović	"Molitva" (Молитва)	Serbian	Vladimir Graić; Saša Milošević Mare
Slovenia	RTVSLO	Alenka Gotar	"Cvet z juga"	Slovene	Andrej Babić
Spain	RTVE	D'Nash	"I Love You Mi Vida"	Spanish, English	Thomas G:son; Rebeca Pous del Toro; Andreas Rickstrand; Tony Sánchez-Ohlsson
Sweden	SVT	The Ark	"The Worrying Kind"	English	Ola Salo
Switzerland	SRG SSR	DJ BoBo	"Vampires Are Alive"	English	René Baumann; Axel Breitung
Turkey	TRT	Kenan Doğulu	"Shake It Up Şekerim"	English	Kenan Doğulu
Ukraine	NTU	Verka Serduchka	"Dancing Lasha Tumbai"	German, English, Surzhyk	Andriy Danylko
United Kingdom	BBC	Scooch	"Flying the Flag (For You)"	English	Andrew Hill; Morten Schjolin; Russ Spencer; Paul Tarry

== Contest overview ==
=== Semi-final ===
Countries participating in the semi-final The top ten of the 2006 contest, who automatically qualify. The "Big Four" countries, who automatically qualify.

The semi-final was held on 10 May 2007 at 22:00 EEST (21:00 CEST). 28 countries performed and all 42 participants voted. The highlighted countries qualified for the final.

Qualifiers

Results of the semi-final of the Eurovision Song Contest 2007
R/O	Country	Artist	Song	Points	Place
1	Bulgaria	Elitsa Todorova and Stoyan Yankoulov	"Water"	146	6
2	Israel	Teapacks	"Push the Button"	17	24
3	Cyprus	Evridiki	"Comme ci, comme ça"	65	15
4	Belarus	Koldun	"Work Your Magic"	176	4
5	Iceland	Eiríkur Hauksson	"Valentine Lost"	77	13
6	Georgia	Sopho	"Visionary Dream"	123	8
7	Montenegro	Stevan Faddy	"'Ajde, kroči"	33	22
8	Switzerland	DJ BoBo	"Vampires Are Alive"	40	20
9	Moldova	Natalia Barbu	"Fight"	91	10
10	Netherlands	Edsilia Rombley	"On Top of the World"	38	21
11	Albania	Frederik Ndoci	"Hear My Plea"	49	17
12	Denmark	DQ	"Drama Queen"	45	19
13	Croatia	Dragonfly feat. Dado Topić	"Vjerujem u ljubav"	54	16
14	Poland	The Jet Set	"Time to Party"	75	14
15	Serbia	Marija Šerifović	"Molitva"	298	1
16	Czech Republic	Kabát	"Malá dáma"	1	28
17	Portugal	Sabrina	"Dança comigo"	88	11
18	Macedonia	Karolina	"Mojot svet"	97	9
19	Norway	Guri Schanke	"Ven a bailar conmigo"	48	18
20	Malta	Olivia Lewis	"Vertigo"	15	25
21	Andorra	Anonymous	"Salvem el món"	80	12
22	Hungary	Magdi Rúzsa	"Unsubstantial Blues"	224	2
23	Estonia	Gerli Padar	"Partners in Crime"	33	22
24	Belgium	The KMG's	"LovePower"	14	26
25	Slovenia	Alenka Gotar	"Cvet z juga"	140	7
26	Turkey	Kenan Doğulu	"Shake It Up Şekerim"	197	3
27	Austria	Eric Papilaya	"Get a Life – Get Alive"	4	27
28	Latvia	Bonaparti.lv	"Questa notte"	168	5

=== Final ===
The finalists were:

- the four automatic qualifiers France, Germany, Spain, and the United Kingdom;
- the top 10 countries from the 2006 final (other than the automatic qualifiers);
- the top 10 countries from the 2007 semi-final.

The final was held on 12 May 2007 at 22:00 EEST (21:00 CEST). and was won by Serbia. 24 countries performed and all 42 participants voted.

Serbia won with 268 points. Ukraine came second with 235 points, with Russia, Turkey, Bulgaria, Belarus, Greece, Armenia, Hungary and Moldova completing the top ten. Spain, Lithuania, France, United Kingdom and Ireland occupied the bottom five positions.

Winner

Results of the final of the Eurovision Song Contest 2007
R/O	Country	Artist	Song	Points	Place
1	Bosnia and Herzegovina	Marija Šestić	"Rijeka bez imena"	106	11
2	Spain	D'Nash	"I Love You Mi Vida"	43	20
3	Belarus	Koldun	"Work Your Magic"	145	6
4	Ireland	Dervish	"They Can't Stop the Spring"	5	24
5	Finland	Hanna Pakarinen	"Leave Me Alone"	53	17
6	Macedonia	Karolina	"Mojot svet"	73	14
7	Slovenia	Alenka Gotar	"Cvet z juga"	66	15
8	Hungary	Magdi Rúzsa	"Unsubstantial Blues"	128	9
9	Lithuania	4Fun	"Love or Leave"	28	21
10	Greece	Sarbel	"Yassou Maria"	139	7
11	Georgia	Sopho	"Visionary Dream"	97	12
12	Sweden	The Ark	"The Worrying Kind"	51	18
13	France	Les Fatals Picards	"L'Amour à la française"	19	22
14	Latvia	Bonaparti.lv	"Questa notte"	54	16
15	Russia	Serebro	"Song #1"	207	3
16	Germany	Roger Cicero	"Frauen regier'n die Welt"	49	19
17	Serbia	Marija Šerifović	"Molitva"	268	1
18	Ukraine	Verka Serduchka	"Dancing Lasha Tumbai"	235	2
19	United Kingdom	Scooch	"Flying the Flag (For You)"	19	22
20	Romania	Todomondo	"Liubi, Liubi, I Love You"	84	13
21	Bulgaria	Elitsa Todorova and Stoyan Yankoulov	"Water"	157	5
22	Turkey	Kenan Doğulu	"Shake It Up Şekerim"	163	4
23	Armenia	Hayko	"Anytime You Need"	138	8
24	Moldova	Natalia Barbu	"Fight"	109	10

==== Spokespersons ====
Each participating broadcaster appointed a spokesperson responsible for announcing the votes for its respective country. The order in which they announced their votes was determined in a draw during the heads of delegation meeting. The spokespersons appeared in the final in the following order:

1. Montenegro – Vidak Latković
2. Belarus – Juliana
3. Armenia – Sirusho
4. Andorra – Marian van de Wal
5. Austria – Eva Pölzl
6. France – Vanessa Dolmen
7. Denmark – Susanne Georgi
8. Greece – Alexis Kostalas
9. Spain – Ainhoa Arbizu
10. Serbia – Maja Nikolić
11. Finland – Laura Voutilainen
12. Turkey – Meltem Ersan Yazgan
13. Bosnia and Herzegovina – Vesna Andree Zaimović
14. Belgium – Maureen Louys
15. Portugal – Francisco Mendes
16. Albania – Leon Menkshi
17. Romania – Andreea Marin Bănică
18. Cyprus – Giannis Haralambous
19. Croatia – Barbara Kolar
20. Slovenia – Peter Poles
21. Israel – Jason Danino-Holt
22. Germany – Thomas Hermanns
23. Lithuania – Lavija Šurnaitė
24. Norway – Synnøve Svabø
25. Switzerland – Sven Epiney
26. Czech Republic – Andrea Savane
27. Netherlands – Paul de Leeuw and Edsilia Rombley
28. Ireland – Linda Martin
29. Malta – Mireille Bonello
30. Estonia – Laura Põldvere
31. Georgia – Neli Agirba
32. Bulgaria – Mira Dobreva
33. Sweden – André Pops
34. Ukraine – Kateryna Osadcha
35. Russia – Yana Churikova
36. Latvia – Jānis Šipkevics
37. Iceland – Ragnhildur Steinunn Jónsdóttir
38. Poland – Maciej Orłoś
39. Moldova – Andrei Porubin
40. United Kingdom – Fearne Cotton
41. Macedonia – Elena Risteska
42. Hungary – Éva Novodomszky

== Detailed voting results ==
All countries participating in the contest were required to use televoting and/or SMS voting during both evenings of the contest. In the event of technical difficulties, or if the votes of the country did not meet the EBU threshold, a back-up jury's results were to be used. Albania and Andorra were the only countries that used their juries.

=== Semi-final ===
Detailed voting results of the semi-final
Voting procedure used: 100% televoting 100% jury vote		Total score	Montenegro	Belarus	Armenia	Andorra	Austria	France	Denmark	Greece	Spain	Serbia	Finland	Turkey	Bosnia and Herzegovina	Belgium	Portugal	Albania	Romania	Cyprus	Croatia	Slovenia	Israel	Germany	Lithuania	Norway	Switzerland	Czech Republic	Netherlands	Ireland	Malta	Estonia	Georgia	Bulgaria	Sweden	Ukraine	Russia	Latvia	Iceland	Poland	Moldova	United Kingdom	Macedonia	Hungary
Contestants	Bulgaria	146	5		1		6	8		10	10	5	2	12	3	2	5	1	1	12	6	3	6	4				10			3		3			2					5	6	7	8
Contestants	Israel	17						6																	4			2				3					1		1					
Contestants	Cyprus	65			4			5		12						5		8	7				4	3										7								10		
Contestants	Belarus	176	4		12				1	7		4		5	2		1	4	3	10			12		10	3		5		6	7	7	4	6	3	12	12	10	4	4	12		4	2
Contestants	Iceland	77		3					10				12												5	12						6	1		12			6						10
Contestants	Georgia	123		8	8			4		6	3		4	10		1				7			8		8				5			10		3		10	10	7		3	8			
Contestants	Montenegro	33										8			5			7			5	5																					3	
Contestants	Switzerland	40				6			3	2										2	1	2		8							10	2						4						
Contestants	Moldova	91		12	7					3	6			8			12		12	6			3							2			7	1		6	6							
Contestants	Netherlands	38				5			4							10	3						1			1	1				8													5
Contestants	Albania	49	6				3			8				4	4						3			1			7							2								1	10	
Contestants	Denmark	45				2						3											5			4			1	5	6				4				8			7		
Contestants	Croatia	54	7				7					6			10			3				8		2			5																6	
Contestants	Poland	75	1	5	5	10	4	3	2			2								3				5	3					10			6			5		1	2			3	2	3
Contestants	Serbia	298	12	10	10		12	7	6	5	5		8		12	4	4	2	6	8	12	12	7	10	1	8	12	12	10	8	1		8	8	10	8	8	2	10	5	6	5	12	12
Contestants	Czech Republic	1																														1												
Contestants	Portugal	88		7	6	12		10			8	1				3				1		1		7			8		4									3		10	7			
Contestants	Macedonia	97	10				5					10		6	7			10	2		8	10					6	6						12	5									
Contestants	Norway	48	2		3	3			7		4		1				2												3		2	4			6				7	2	1			1
Contestants	Malta	15												7				6																								2		
Contestants	Andorra	80		4						4	12		5	2			6				2	4	2		2	2		7		4		5			2		4		6	6			1	
Contestants	Hungary	224		1		4	8	2	12		1	12	10	1	1	7	10	5	10	4	7	6		6	7	10	4	8	8	7	4	8	10	4	8	4	3	8	12	8		4		
Contestants	Estonia	33											6												6					3			2					12			4			
Contestants	Belgium	14																											2				12											
Contestants	Slovenia	140	8	6		8	2	1			7	7		3	6	6	7		4		10					5		4	6	1	5			5		7	5	5		7	3		5	7
Contestants	Turkey	197	3		2	7	10	12	8		2		7		8	12		12	8					12		6	10	1	12					10	7	1	7		3	1	10	12	8	6
Contestants	Austria	4				1																					3																	
Contestants	Latvia	168		2			1		5	1			3			8	8		5	5	4	7	10		12	7	2	3	7	12	12	12	5		1	3	2		5	12	2	8		4

==== 12 points ====
Below is a summary of all 12 points in the semi-final:

N.	Contestant	Nation(s) giving 12 points
9	Serbia	Austria, Bosnia and Herzegovina, Croatia, Czech Republic, Hungary, Macedonia, Montenegro, Slovenia, Switzerland
6	Turkey	Albania, Belgium, France, Germany, Netherlands, United Kingdom
5	Belarus	Armenia, Israel, Moldova, Russia, Ukraine
5	Latvia	Estonia, Ireland, Lithuania, Malta, Poland
3	Hungary	Denmark, Iceland, Serbia
3	Iceland	Finland, Norway, Sweden
3	Moldova	Belarus, Portugal, Romania
2	Bulgaria	Cyprus, Turkey
1	Andorra	Spain
1	Belgium	Georgia
1	Cyprus	Greece
1	Estonia	Latvia
1	Macedonia	Bulgaria
1	Portugal	Andorra

=== Final ===
Detailed voting results of the final
Voting procedure used: 100% televoting 100% jury vote		Total score	Montenegro	Belarus	Armenia	Andorra	Austria	France	Denmark	Greece	Spain	Serbia	Finland	Turkey	Bosnia and Herzegovina	Belgium	Portugal	Albania	Romania	Cyprus	Croatia	Slovenia	Israel	Germany	Lithuania	Norway	Switzerland	Czech Republic	Netherlands	Ireland	Malta	Estonia	Georgia	Bulgaria	Sweden	Ukraine	Russia	Latvia	Iceland	Poland	Moldova	United Kingdom	Macedonia	Hungary
Contestants	Bosnia and Herzegovina	106	7		1		8	1	7			8		10				8			10	8		3		6	8	4	7						6								4	
Contestants	Spain	43	4					6		1						3	8	12					2				5				2													
Contestants	Belarus	145	3		10					5		2			4		1	2	1	6			12		7			2			10	7	8	1		12	12	8	4	7	10		7	4
Contestants	Ireland	5																5																										
Contestants	Finland	53		1		7			4															1	5	4	1					6			12				12					
Contestants	Macedonia	73	10				1					10		1	8			3			8	10					6	5					1	10										
Contestants	Slovenia	66	8	4							3	5			7	2	3				7				1						5					4	3	4		4			6	
Contestants	Hungary	128				6	2		8			12	10			5	2		8		4	5		7	4	8	3		4	5	1	4	5		8			5	8	2		2		
Contestants	Lithuania	28		2		1																								12								10				3		
Contestants	Greece	139		3	8			3	1		2	4		4	3	8		7	10	12			1	10			4	3	5				4	12	4				5		6	10	3	7
Contestants	Georgia	97		6	5					3			7	5	1	6				1	2	2	6		12			1	2	1		5				8	7	6		5	4			2
Contestants	Sweden	51				2			12				8													12													10			7		
Contestants	France	19			2	8												4							3							2												
Contestants	Latvia	54																	2		1	6			10	3			3	10	4	10								1		4		
Contestants	Russia	207	6	12	12	3		2	2	8	4	7	3	8	2		4		3	7	3	3	8	6	6	5		6		6	6	12	7	5	5	10		7	1	3	8	6	5	6
Contestants	Germany	49				5	7		5		5		1					6									7		6			3			1				2			1		
Contestants	Serbia	268	12	7	7		12	8	6	4	1		12		12	7	5	1	6	3	12	12	3	8		10	12	8	8	4	8		6	6	10	6	5	3	7	8	5		12	12
Contestants	Ukraine	235	2	10	6	12	4	4	3	7	7	3	6	3	5	1	12		4	4	5	4	10	5	8	2	2	12	1	8	3	8	10	3	3		8	12	6	12	7	8	2	3
Contestants	United Kingdom	19																												7	12													
Contestants	Romania	84				10	3	7		2	12			2			7			5			7							3				2		2	1	1			12			8
Contestants	Bulgaria	157	5		4		6	5		12	10	6	5	6	6	4	6		5	10	6	7		4				7			7	1				3	4	2			3	5	8	10
Contestants	Turkey	163	1				10	12	10				4		10	12		10	7					12		7	10		12				2	7	7	1	2		3		1	12	10	1
Contestants	Armenia	138		5			5	10		6	8			12		10				8			5	2				10	10				12	8		5	10			10	2			
Contestants	Moldova	109		8	3	4				10	6	1	2	7			10		12	2		1	4		2	1				2			3	4	2	7	6			6			1	5

==== 12 points ====
Below is a summary of all 12 points in the final:

N.	Contestant	Nation(s) giving 12 points
9	Serbia	Austria, Bosnia and Herzegovina, Croatia, Finland, Hungary, Macedonia, Montenegro, Slovenia, Switzerland
5	Ukraine	Andorra, Czech Republic, Latvia, Poland, Portugal
5	Turkey	Belgium, France, Germany, Netherlands, United Kingdom
3	Russia	Armenia, Belarus, Estonia
3	Belarus	Israel, Russia, Ukraine
2	Armenia	Georgia, Turkey
2	Finland	Iceland, Sweden
2	Greece	Bulgaria, Cyprus
2	Sweden	Denmark, Norway
2	Romania	Moldova, Spain
1	Bulgaria	Greece
1	Georgia	Lithuania
1	Hungary	Serbia
1	Lithuania	Ireland
1	Moldova	Romania
1	Spain	Albania
1	United Kingdom	Malta

== Broadcasts ==
The official Eurovision Song Contest website also provided a live stream without commentary, using the peer-to-peer transport Octoshape.

Broadcasters and commentators in participating countries
Country	Broadcaster	Channel(s)	Show(s)	Commentator(s)	Ref(s)
Andorra	RTVA	ATV	All shows	Meri Picart and Josep Lluís Trabal	
Austria	ORF	ORF 1	All shows	Andi Knoll	
Belarus	BTRC		All shows	Denis Kurian and Alexander Tikhanovich	
Belgium	RTBF	La Une, RTBF Sat	All shows	Jean-Pierre Hautier and Jean-Louis Lahaye	
Belgium	RTBF	La Première	All shows		
Belgium	VRT	Eén	All shows	André Vermeulen and Anja Daems	
Bosnia and Herzegovina	BHRT	BHT 1	All shows	Dejan Kukrić	
Croatia	HRT	HRT 1	All shows	Duško Ćurlić	
Czech Republic	ČT	ČT1	All shows	Kateřina Kristelová	
Czech Republic	ČT	ČT1	Final	Josef Vojtek	
Denmark	DR	DR1	All shows	Søren Nystrøm Rasted and Adam Duvå Hall	
Estonia	ETV		All shows	Marko Reikop	
Finland	Yle	Yle TV2	All shows	Heikki Paasonen, Ellen Jokikunnas and Asko Murtomäki	
Finland	Yle	Yle FST5	All shows	Thomas Lundin	
Finland	Yle	YLE Radio Suomi	All shows	Sanna Kojo and Jorma Hietamäki	
Finland	Yle	Yle Radio Vega	All shows		
France	France Télévisions	France 4	Semi-final	Peggy Olmi and Yann Renoard	
France	France Télévisions	France 3	Final	Julien Lepers and Tex	
Germany	ARD	NDR Fernsehen	Semi-final	Peter Urban	
Germany	ARD	Das Erste	Final	Peter Urban	
Greece	ERT	NET, Deftero Programma	All shows	Fotis Sergoulopoulos and Maria Bakodimou	
Greece	ERT	NET 105.8	Final	Fotis Sergoulopoulos and Maria Bakodimou	
Hungary	MTV	m1	All shows	Gábor Gundel Takács	
Iceland	RÚV	Sjónvarpið	All shows	Sigmar Guðmundsson	
Iceland	RÚV	Rás 2	Semi-final		
Ireland	RTÉ	RTÉ Two	Semi-final	Marty Whelan	
Ireland	RTÉ	RTÉ One	Final	Marty Whelan	
Ireland	RTÉ	RTÉ Radio 1	Final	Larry Gogan	
Latvia	LTV	LTV1	All shows	Kārlis Streips	
Lithuania	LRT		All shows	Darius Užkuraitis	
Macedonia	MRT	MRT 1	All shows	Milanka Rašić	
Malta	PBS	TVM	All shows		
Moldova	TRM	Moldova 1	All shows		
Moldova	TRM	Radio Moldova	All shows		
Montenegro	RTCG	TVCG 1	Semi-final	Dražen Bauković and Tamara Ivanković	
Netherlands	NOS	Nederland 1	Semi-final	Cornald Maas	
Netherlands	NOS	Nederland 1	Final	Cornald Maas and Paul de Leeuw	
Norway	NRK	NRK1	All shows	Per Sundnes	
Norway	NRK	NRK P1	Final		
Poland	TVP	TVP1	All shows	Artur Orzech	
Portugal	RTP	RTP1, RTP Internacional	All shows	Isabel Angelino and Jorge Gabriel	
Portugal	RTP	RTP África	Final	Isabel Angelino and Jorge Gabriel	
Romania	TVR	TVR1	All shows		
Russia	Channel One (Note: Also broadcast deferred via the Orbita satellite broadcasting system in the Russian Far East)		All shows	Yuriy Aksyuta and Yelena Batinova	
Serbia	RTS	RTS1, RTS Sat	All shows	Duška Vučinić-Lučić	
Slovenia	RTVSLO	TV SLO 2	Semi-final	Mojca Mavec	
Slovenia	RTVSLO	TV SLO 1	Final	Mojca Mavec	
Slovenia	RTVSLO	Radio Val 202	All shows	Jernej Vene and Aida Kurtović	
Spain	RTVE	La 2	Semi-final	Beatriz Pécker (Note: The Spanish commentary in the semi-final featured guest appearances from David Civera, José María Íñigo, Karina, Rosario Mohedano, Mariano Mariano, Teté Delgado, Gisela and Alfredo Amestoy.)	
Spain	RTVE	La Primera, TVE Internacional	Final	Beatriz Pécker	
Sweden	SVT	SVT1, SVT HD	All shows	Kristian Luuk and Josef Sterzenbach	
Sweden	SR			Carolina Norén	
Switzerland	SRG SSR	SF 2	Semi-final		
Switzerland	SRG SSR	SF 1	Final	Bernard Thurnheer	
Switzerland	SRG SSR	TSR 2	Semi-final	Jean-Marc Richard and Nicolas Tanner	
Switzerland	SRG SSR	TSR 2	Final	Jean-Marc Richard and Henri Dès	
Switzerland	SRG SSR	TSI 2	Semi-final		
Switzerland	SRG SSR	TSI 1	Final		
Turkey	TRT	TRT 1	Semi-final		
Turkey	TRT	TRT 1	Final	Hakan Urgancı	
Ukraine	NTU	Pershyi Natsionalnyi	All shows		
United Kingdom	BBC	BBC Three	Semi-final	Paddy O'Connell and Sarah Cawood	
United Kingdom	BBC	BBC One, BBC HD	Final	Sir Terry Wogan	
United Kingdom	BBC	BBC Radio 2	Final	Ken Bruce	

Broadcasters and commentators in non-participating countries
Country	Broadcaster	Channel(s)	Show(s)	Commentator(s)	Ref(s)
Australia	SBS	SBS TV (Note: Deferred broadcast of the semi-final on 12 May at 20:30 AEST (10:30 UTC) and the final on 13 May at 19:30 AEST (09:30 UTC))	Semi-final	Paddy O'Connell and Sarah Cawood	
Australia	SBS	SBS TV	Final	Terry Wogan	
Azerbaijan	İTV				
Gibraltar	GBC	GBC TV	Final		

=== International broadcasts ===
- Australia – Although Australia was not itself eligible to enter, the semi-final and final were broadcast on SBS and, as per previous years, featured commentary relayed from the BBC. As was the case each year, they were not broadcast live due to the difference in Australian time zones. The final rated an estimated 436,000 viewers, and was ranked number 20 on the broadcasters top rating programs of the 2006/2007 financial year.
- Azerbaijan – AzTV had announced its interest in entering the contest; however, after it was denied active EBU membership on 18 June 2007, it was left unable to participate. Another Azerbaijani broadcaster, İctimai Television, broadcast the contest. It was a preliminary EBU member at the time, and had broadcast it for the previous two years. It was the only non-participating broadcaster this year to send its own commentators to the contest.

=== High-definition broadcast ===
Yle produced the event in 1080i HD and 5.1 surround sound. This was the first year that the event was broadcast live in HD. The British broadcaster BBC broadcast the final in high definition on BBC HD. Swedish broadcaster SVT broadcast both the semi-final and the final on SVT HD. However, the event was available on DVD in standard-definition only, with no DVD or Blu-ray version available in high-definition.

== Other awards ==
In addition to the main winner's trophy, the Marcel Bezençon Awards and the Barbara Dex Award were contested during the 2007 Eurovision Song Contest. The OGAE, "General Organisation of Eurovision Fans" voting poll also took place before the contest.

=== Marcel Bezençon Awards ===
The Marcel Bezençon Awards, organised since 2002 by Sweden's then-Head of Delegation and 1992 representative Christer Björkman, and 1984 winner Richard Herrey, honours songs in the contest's final. The awards are divided into three categories: Artistic Award which was voted by previous winners of the contest, Composers Award, and Press Award.

Category	Country	Song	Artist	Songwriter(s)
Artistic Award	Serbia	"Molitva"	Marija Šerifović	Vladimir Graić; Saša Milošević Mare
Composers Award	Hungary	"Unsubstantial Blues"	Magdi Rúzsa	Magdolna Rúzsa; Imre Mózsik
Press Award	Ukraine	"Dancing Lasha Tumbai"	Verka Serduchka	Andriy Danylko

=== OGAE ===
OGAE, an organisation of over forty Eurovision Song Contest fan clubs across Europe and beyond, conducts an annual voting poll first held in 2002 as the Marcel Bezençon Fan Award. After all votes were cast, the top-ranked entry in the 2007 poll was also the winner of the contest, Serbia's "Molitva" performed by Marija Šerifović; the top five results are shown below. (Note: Table reflects the corrected result of Switzerland since the cited source had a calculation error.)

Country	Artist	Song	Points
Serbia	Marija Šerifović	"Molitva"	184
Belarus	Dmitry Koldun	"Work Your Magic"	159
Switzerland	DJ BoBo	"Vampires Are Alive"	156
Cyprus	Evridiki	"Comme ci, comme ça"	142
Greece	Sarbel	"Yassou Maria"	107

=== Barbara Dex Award ===
The Barbara Dex Award is a humorous fan award given to the worst dressed artist each year. Named after Barbara Dex who came last for Belgium in 1993, wearing her self-designed dress, the award was handed by the fansite House of Eurovision from 1997 to 2016 and is being carried out by the fansite songfestival.be since 2017.

Country	Artist
Ukraine	Verka Serduchka

== Official album ==
Cover art of the official album

Eurovision Song Contest: Helsinki 2007 was the official compilation album of the 2007 contest, put together by the European Broadcasting Union and released by CMC International on 20 April 2007. The album featured all 42 songs that entered in the 2007 contest, including the semi-finalists that failed to qualify into the grand final.

=== Charts ===
Chart (2007)	Peak position
German Compilation Albums (Offizielle Top 100)	3
