= Cyprus in the Eurovision Song Contest 2007 =

- Eurovision Song Contest 2007
- Participating broadcaster: Cyprus Broadcasting Corporation (CyBC)
- Country: Cyprus
- Selection process: Internal selection
- Announcement date: Artist: 26 January 2007; Song: 23 February 2007

Competing entry
- Song: "Comme ci, comme ça"
- Artist: Evridiki
- Songwriters: Dimitris Korgialas; Poseidonas Yiannopoulos

Placement
- Semi-final result: Failed to qualify (15th)

Participation chronology

Cyprus was represented at the Eurovision Song Contest 2007 with the song "Comme ci, comme ça", composed by Dimitris Korgialas, with lyrics by Poseidonas Yiannopoulos, and performed by Evridiki. The Cypriot participating broadcaster, the Cyprus Broadcasting Corporation (CyBC), internally selected its entry for the contest. Evridiki was announced on 26 January 2007. She had previously represented Cyprus in 1992 and in 1994 where she both placed 11th. The song, "Comme ci, comme ça", was presented to the public on 23 February 2007 during the special show Cyprus 12 Points - Chypre 12 Points. This was the first time that Cyprus was represented with a song performed entirely in the French language at the Eurovision Song Contest.

Following a promotional tour that brought Evridiki to Russia, Belgium, Belarus, and the UK, Cyprus competed in the semi-final of the Eurovision Song Contest on 10 May 2007. Performing during the show in position 3, "Comme ci, comme ça" was not announced among the top 10 entries of the semi-final and therefore did not qualify to compete in the final. It was later revealed that Cyprus placed 15th out of the 28 participating countries in the semi-final, with 65 points.

== Background ==
Prior to the 2007 contest, the Cyprus Broadcasting Corporation (CyBC) had participated in the Eurovision Song Contest representing Cyprus 24 times since its debut in 1981. Its best placing was fifth, which it achieved three times: in 1982 with the song "Mono i agapi" performed by Anna Vissi, in 1997 with "Mana mou" performed by Hara and Andreas Constantinou, and in 2004 with "Stronger Every Minute" performed by Lisa Andreas. Its least successful result was in 1986 when it placed last with the song "Tora zo" by Elpida, receiving only four points in total. Its worst finish in terms of points received, however, was in 1999 when it placed second to last with "Tha'nai erotas" by Marlain Angelidou, receiving only two points. At the previous contest in 2006, they failed to qualify for the final with the "Why Angels Cry" performed by Annet Artani.

As part of its duties as participating broadcaster, CyBC organises the selection of its entry in the Eurovision Song Contest and broadcasts the event in the country. CyBC had previously used various methods to select its entry, such as internal selections and televised national finals to choose the performer, song or both to compete at Eurovision. In the year prior, the broadcaster had organised a national final, but for 2007, CyBC's board opted to select the entry internally. Board Director Marios Mavrikios explained that the decision to select internally was in response to a controversy related to the previous year's process, which had used public voting.

== Before Eurovision ==
=== Internal selection ===
On 26 January 2007, CyBC announced that they had selected Evridiki to represent Cyprus at the Eurovision Song Contest 2007. She had previously represented the nation at the contest in 1992 (with "Teriazoume") and in 1994 (with "Eimai anthropos ki ego"), placing 11th on both occasions. Her song, "Comme ci, comme ça", was presented to the public on 23 February during the special show Cyprus 12 Points - Chypre 12 Points. The event took place at CyBC Studio 3 in Nicosia, was hosted by Marina Filippidou and Giannis Charalampous and was broadcast on RIK 1 and RIK Sat; it was also available online via the broadcaster's website cybc.cy. The song was written by Dimitris Korgialas and Poseidonas Yiannopoulos, and was the first Cypriot entry to be performed entirely in the French language. While speaking about the decision to write the song in French, Belgium-born Yiannopoulos stated "From the moment I heard the 'super beat' I started to think in my mother tongue, so in French". In addition to the song presentation, the reveal show featured guest performances by Dmitry Koldun (who would represent Belarus in 2007), Olivia Lewis (who would represent Malta in 2007), The Jet Set (who would represent Poland in 2007), and Todomondo (who would represent Romania in 2007).

=== Promotion ===
To promote the entry, a music video of "Comme ci, comme ça" was filmed at a warehouse in Athens. Directed by White Room, the video was presented during a newscast on RIK 1 and RIK SAT on 10 March 2007. The song was also included on Evridiki's studio album 13, which was released on 26 March.

Evridiki also made several appearances across Europe specifically to promote the Cypriot Eurovision entry. On 28 February, Evridiki performed "Comme ci, comme ça" during the Greek Eurovision national final, and on 20 and 21 March, she performed during the MITT International Tourism Exhibition which was held at the Expocentre Fairgrounds in Moscow, Russia, where she was joined by Greece's 2007 entrant Sarbel. The next day, Evridiki was in Belarus, where she appeared during the BTRC morning programme Dobrai Ranitsy, Belarus. On 20 April, she performed during the 12 Points Party DeLuxe event, which was held at the Noorderterras in Antwerp, Belgium. Her promotional activities concluded in the United Kingdom between 21 and 23 April, including a performance at the Club Palace in London on 22 April.

== At Eurovision ==
The Eurovision Song Contest 2007 took place at Hartwall Arena in Helsinki, Finland, and consisted of a semi-final on 10 May and the final on 12 May 2007. Both the semi-final and the final were broadcast in Cyprus with commentary by Vaso Komninou. In preparation for the contest, CyBC aired five preview shows between 8 and 22 April, which showcased the promotional videos of the 42 participating entries and allowed viewers to vote for their favourite and win tickets to Eurovision. CyBC also aired an hour-long show on 10 May, just before the semi-final, which was dedicated to the Cypriot entry.

All nations with the exceptions of the host country, the "Big Four" (France, Germany, Spain and the United Kingdom), and the ten highest placed finishers in the 2006 contest were required to qualify from the 10 May 2007 semi-final to compete in the final on 12 May 2007. On 12 March 2007, an allocation draw was held, which determined the running order for the 10 May semi-final. Cyprus was drawn to perform in position 3, following the entry from Israel and preceding the entry from Belarus.

=== Semi-final ===
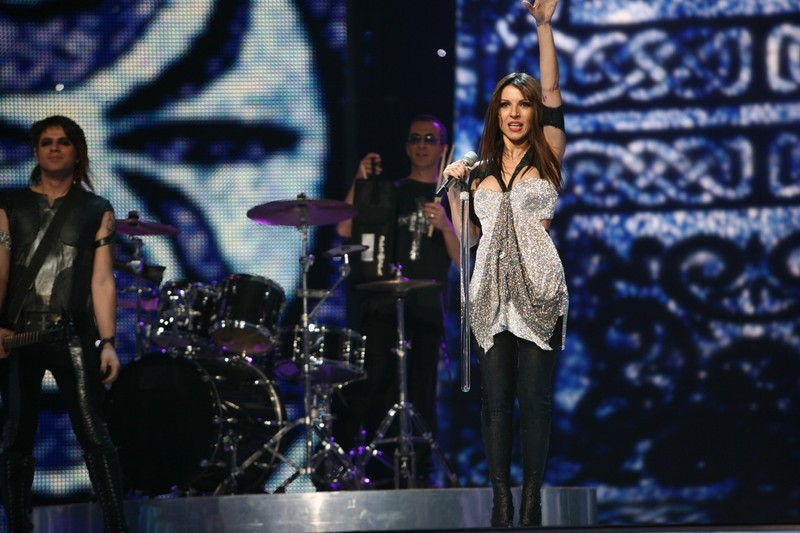
Evridiki during a rehearsal before the semi-final

Evridiki and her team arrived in Helsinki on 2 May, after rehearsing the song and preparing for the event in Nicosia. The team took part in technical rehearsals on 3 and 5 May, followed by dress rehearsals on 9 and 10 May. The Cypriot performance featured Evridiki dressed in a silver and black outfit, joined by two backing vocalists, a drummer, a keyboardist and a guitarist; her dress was designed by Greek designer Christoforos Kotentos. During the performance, Evridiki raised her microphone and performed robotic dance movements. The LED screens displayed white and blue patterns, while pyrotechnic effects were also featured for the performance. The backing vocalists that joined Evridiki on stage were Froso Stilianou and Marianna Gerasimidou, while the musicians were Korgialas, Dimitris Horianopoulos, and Giannis Skoutaris.

At the end of the show, Cyprus was not announced among the top 10 entries in the semi-final and therefore failed to qualify to compete in the final. It was later revealed that Cyprus placed 15th in the semi-final, receiving a total of 65 points.

=== Voting ===
Voting during the three shows involved each country awarding points from 1–8, 10, and 12 to the other competing countries; counties were not allowed to register votes for themselves. All countries participating in the contest were required to use televoting and/or SMS voting during both rounds of the contest. In the event of technical difficulties, or if the votes of the country did not meet the EBU threshold, then a back-up jury's results were to be used. Cyprus awarded its top 12 points from televoting to Bulgaria in the semi-final and to Greece in the final. The nation received 65 points in the semi-final, placing 15th. This result included the top 12 points from Greece. CyBC appointed Giannis Charalampous as its spokesperson to announce the Cypriot votes during the final. Below is a breakdown of points awarded to and by Cyprus in the semi-final and final.

==== Points awarded to Cyprus ====
Points awarded to Cyprus (Semi-final)
Score	Country
12 points	Greece
10 points	United Kingdom
8 points	Albania
7 points	Bulgaria; Romania
6 points	
5 points	Belgium; France
4 points	Armenia; Israel
3 points	Germany
2 points	
1 point	

==== Points awarded by Cyprus ====
Points awarded by Cyprus (Semi-final)
Score	Country
12 points	Bulgaria
10 points	Belarus
8 points	Serbia
7 points	Georgia
6 points	Moldova
5 points	Latvia
4 points	Hungary
3 points	Poland
2 points	Switzerland
1 point	Portugal

Points awarded by Cyprus (Final)
Score	Country
12 points	Greece
10 points	Bulgaria
8 points	Armenia
7 points	Russia
6 points	Belarus
5 points	Romania
4 points	Ukraine
3 points	Serbia
2 points	Moldova
1 point	Georgia

== After Eurovision ==
Following the contest, Evridiki and "Comme ci, comme ça" were nominated for several Aphrodite Awards at the 2007 Cyprus Music Awards in June, with the singer winning the award for "Best Female Artist of the Year 2007" and the song receiving the nominations for "Best Song of the Year 2007" and "Best Video Clip of the Year 2007". That month, she and Korgialas also appeared as a supporting act for Evanescence's concert in Athens on 23 June. From July through September, the two toured Greece and the islands, performing Evridiki's past Eurovision entries. In speaking about her experience at Eurovision in September 2007, Evridiki stated that she would not pursue future participations and "Had I not participated so many times, I would probably consider it again, but the circle has closed for me". It was also mentioned that her album 13 did not sell as well as expected and would therefore be re-released with two bonus tracks in October 2007.
