= Wassabi =

Romanian musical girl group

- Origin: Romania
- Genres: Pop
- Years active: 2006-2009
- Past members: Laura Petrescu; Veronica Tecaru; Ramona Sora; Luisa Luca

Wassabi were a Romanian musical girl group established in 2006 under the management of Marius Moga, who also wrote many of their songs. The band was made up of Laura Petrescu, Veronica Tecaru, Ramona Sora, and Luisa Luca.

== Career ==
The group launched its series of hits with the album Și m-am îndrăgostit de tine. The album contained "Have Some Fun with Radio 21" that was used as the signature song for the Romanian radio station Radio 21. The band also released the title song from the album "Și m-am îndrăgostit de tine" as well as "Lonely Girl". Their biggest hit was "Don't Go Baby" written by Marius Moga.

The band also took part in Selecţia Naţională Eurovision 2007 to represent Romania in the Eurovision Song Contest. The song was "Do the Tango with Me". Wassabi also presented another song "Crazy" in collaboration with band Morandi, but the song was withdrawn prior to the final to allow better chances for "Do the Tango with Me".

== After the split-up ==
The band continued until 2009 when Laura Petrescu announced she was leaving the band. The band disbanded soon after, although Lora came back to be reconciled with her bandmates in 2011.

=== Lora ===
Laura Petrescu known by her mononym Lora (born in Vaslui, Romania on 23 July 1982) became a very famous solo singer. She took part in 2010 in collaboration with Sonny Flame in Selecţia Naţională 2010 with the song "Come Along". The song came 7th overall despite its great popularity. Lora has collaborated with many acts including Sensor in the open concert in Bucharest. with Phelipe in "Hot Spot" and in 2010 with Adrian Sîna of the band Akcent in "My Passion" with great success in Romania and internationally. The music video featured models Ana Stefanescu and Silviu Tolu. Lora released the song "No More Tears" with the help of Adrian Sîna also with an accompanying music video in 2011. Her song "Fall in Love Tonight" has also found international success.

=== Minelli ===
Luisa Ionela Luca, known professionally as Minelli, is a Romanian singer, songwriter and lyricist. Minelli is appreciated in Romania as a composer and lyricist, but her international fame as a soloist was ensured by singles such as "Mariola" (2019) and "Rampampam" (2021). As a songwriter and lyricist, Minelli's repertoire contains hit songs such as "Inimi de ceară" (2017) performed by Andra, "Touch Me" (2019) performed by Antonia or "Flashbacks" (2021) performed by Inna.

== Discography ==
=== Albums ===
- Și m-am îndrăgostit de tine

=== Singles ===
(For solo singles releases by Lora, see discography on Lora (singer) page)

- "Have Some Fun with Radio 21"
- "Și m-am îndrăgostit de tine"
- "Lonely Girl"
- "Don't Go Baby"
- "Do the Tango with Me" Selecţia Naţională Eurovision 2007
- "Crazy (Morandi and Wassabi) Selecţia Naţională Eurovision 2007 (withdrawn prior to final)
