= Morris (singer) =

- Born: Marius Iancu; September 9, 1976 (age 49); Roman, Romania
- Genres: Pop, electro, house
- Occupations: Dj, record producer
- Years active: 2008–present
- Label: Roton
- Website: www.morris.ro

Marius Iancu better known by his stage name Morris (born in Roman, Romania on 9 September 1976) is a Romanian singer and DJ specializing in pop music, house and electro sounds. He is signed to the Romanian Roton record label.

== Career ==
Marius Iancu picked the name Morris in school where there were "too many Mariuses". He started acting and taking drama studies at Facultatii de Teatru and continued into working in commercials, television series and films. His interest in music led him to appear as DJ and singer in various night venues in Bucharest and elsewhere, also taking part in music contests and music festivals.

In 2008, he started collaborating with the Romanian music producing trio Play & Win most notably with his big hit in Romania "Till the Morning Light" in 2008 and "Desire" in 2009 that became a hit not only in Romania, but also in Russia, Poland and Spain. He also collaborated with and gained further fame with his European hit "Havana Lover" featuring Sonny Flame in 2009 and with "Angel Eyes" with David Deejay in 2010.

== Awards and nominations ==
- In 2009, Morris was nominated for his song "Desire" at the Romanian Top Hits Awards for category "Best Hit – Male"
- In 2011, he won the 'Best DJ' category at the Romanian Top Hits Awards.

== Discography/videography ==
(Selective)

- 2008: Till The Morning Light
- 2009: Desire
- 2009: Havana Lover feat. Sonny Flame
- 2009: Destiny
- 2009: Lost
- 2010: Angel Eyes feat. David Deejay
- 2011: Because Of You
- 2012: Boca Linda feat. Reea & Tamy
- 2013: Awela
- 2013: Siente La Vibra feat. Tamy
- 2013: Reina feat. Alex Rubio
