= Romania in the Eurovision Song Contest 2007 =

- Eurovision Song Contest 2007
- Participating broadcaster: Televiziunea Română (TVR)
- Country: Romania
- Selection process: Selecția Națională 2007
- Selection date: 10 March 2007

Competing entry
- Song: "Liubi, Liubi, I Love You"
- Artist: Todomondo
- Songwriters: Vlad Crețu; Kamara Ghedi; Bogdan Tașcău

Placement
- Final result: 13th, 84 points

Participation chronology

Romania was represented at the Eurovision Song Contest 2007 with the song "Liubi, Liubi, I Love You", written by Vlad Crețu, Kamara Ghedi, and Bogdan Tașcău, and performed by the group Todomondo. The Romanian participating broadcaster, Televiziunea Română (TVR), held the national final Selecția Națională 2007 in order to select its entry for the contest. Controversy surrounded the event, as TVR disqualified several entries over the course of the competition.

Prior to Eurovision, "Liubi, Liubi, I Love You" was promoted by a music video and a promotional tour in Belarus. Todomondo ultimately achieved 13th place in the contest's Grand Final on 12 May 2007, scoring 84 points. Their performance saw the use of pyrotechnics.

== Background ==
Prior to the 2007 contest, Televiziunea Română (TVR) had participated in the Eurovision Song Contest representing Romania nine times since its first entry in 1994. Its highest placing in the contest had been third place, achieved in 2005 with "Let Me Try" performed by Luminița Anghel and Sistem. In 2006, "Tornerò" by Mihai Trăistariu finished in fourth place.

== Before Eurovision ==
=== Selecția Națională 2007 ===
==== Competing entries and shows ====
TVR organized Selecția Națională 2007, a competition to select their entrant for the Eurovision Song Contest 2007. In early January 2007, the broadcaster published a provisory list of 24 songs shortlisted to compete in the two semi-finals of Selecția Națională on 27 January and 3 February, and the final on 10 February. They were selected on 17 January, out of 259 entries submitted to TVR until 15 January, by a jury panel consisting of music and entertainment professionals Ionel Tudor, Cornel Fugaru, Adi Despot, Dan Teodorescu, Mihai Ogășanu, Șerban Huidu and Titus Andrei.

"Do the Tango with Me", "Liubi, Liubi, I Love You" and "Love Is All You Need" were appointed by TVR as replacement songs for the voluntarily withdrawn entries "Hungry for Love" and "Prinde-mă, aprinde-mă" by Andreea Bălan, as well as for "Gozalo" by Mandinga. The results in each show of Selecția Națională were determined by a 50/50 combination of votes from a jury panel—made up alternately of Andrei Partoş, Titus Munteanu, Gabriel Cotabiţă, Ogăşanu, Despot, Andrei Tudor, Teodorescu, Titus Andrei, Mirela Fugaru, Horia Moculescu, Cristian Faur, Mihai Georgescu, Sorin Vasile and Ionuț Radu—and a public televote. Cătălin Măruță and 3rei Sud Est were hired as hosts. Due to multiple requests from observers, TVR decided to establish a commission on 5 February to analyse several entries in regards to their compliance to the competition's regulations.

Artist	Song	Songwriter(s)
Ada	"You and Me"	Laurențiu Ponoiu
Celia	"Șoapte"	Costi Ioniță
Desperado and Tony Poptămaș	"European – a Beautiful Sin"	Kovács László
Desperado and Tony Poptămaș	"Where Were You"	Ovidiu Buhățel; Sandy Deac; Kovács László; Tony Poptămaș; Vlad Spătar
Gabi Huiban	"Rubber Girl"	Gabi Huiban
Indiggo	"Love Struck"	Thomas G:Son
Jasmine	"Music in My Soul"	Adrian Cristescu
Moni-K	"În lumea mea"	Adrian Cristescu; Moni-K
Morandi and Wassabi	"Crazy"	Marius Moga; Andrei Ropcea
Giulia Nahmany	"Make-It"	Papa Jr.
New Effect and Moni-K (Note: Sources credit "Sinada" differently, including to solely New Effect or to New Effect featuring Moni-K.)	"Sinada"	Ionuţ Calara; George Lazăr; Bodgan Raul Vasile
Nico	"Dulce-amăruie"	Costi Ioniță; Marcel Prodan; Constantin Neguțu
Nico	"Love Is All You Need"	Laurențiu Matei
Marcel Pavel	"No poder vivir"	Daniel Alexandrescu; Marcel Pavel; Daniel Velasquez
Daniela Răduică	"Nu insista"	Cristi Nistor; Daniela Răduică
Rednex featuring Ro-Mania	"Well-o-wee"	Daniel Alexandrescu; Radu Fornea; Annika Ljungberg; Anders Lundström; Mirea Presel; Jens Sylsjö
Tibi Scobiola	"Nu pot să uit"	Lazăr Cercel; Laurențiu Duță
Simplu and Andra	"Dracula, My Love"	Eduard Andreianu; Andrei Maria; Marius Moga
Spitalul de Urgență	"Stay United"	Dan Helciug
Todomondo (Note: "Liubi, Liubi, I Love You" was initially credited to Locomondo before issues with the Greek group of the same name resulted in the change to Todomondo.)	"Liubi, Liubi, I Love You"	Vlad Crețu; Kamara Ghedi; Bodgan Tașcău
Trupa Respect	"I Will Love You"	Sandy Deac; Kovacsz Laszlo
Trupa Veche	"Deci 20"	Trupa Veche
Ionuț Ungureanu	"Let the Music Play" (Note: Due to unknown reasons, the initially shortisted "Let the Music Play" by Ionuț Ungureanu was not performed at Selecția Națională. However, Ungureanu presented the entry "Time"—written by Eduard Cîrcotă and Cristian Hrişcu Badea—at the second semi-final and final of the competition as part of Romanian band Provincialii.)	Eduard Cîrcotă
Wassabi	"Do the Tango with Me"	Marius Moga

===== Semi-final 1 =====
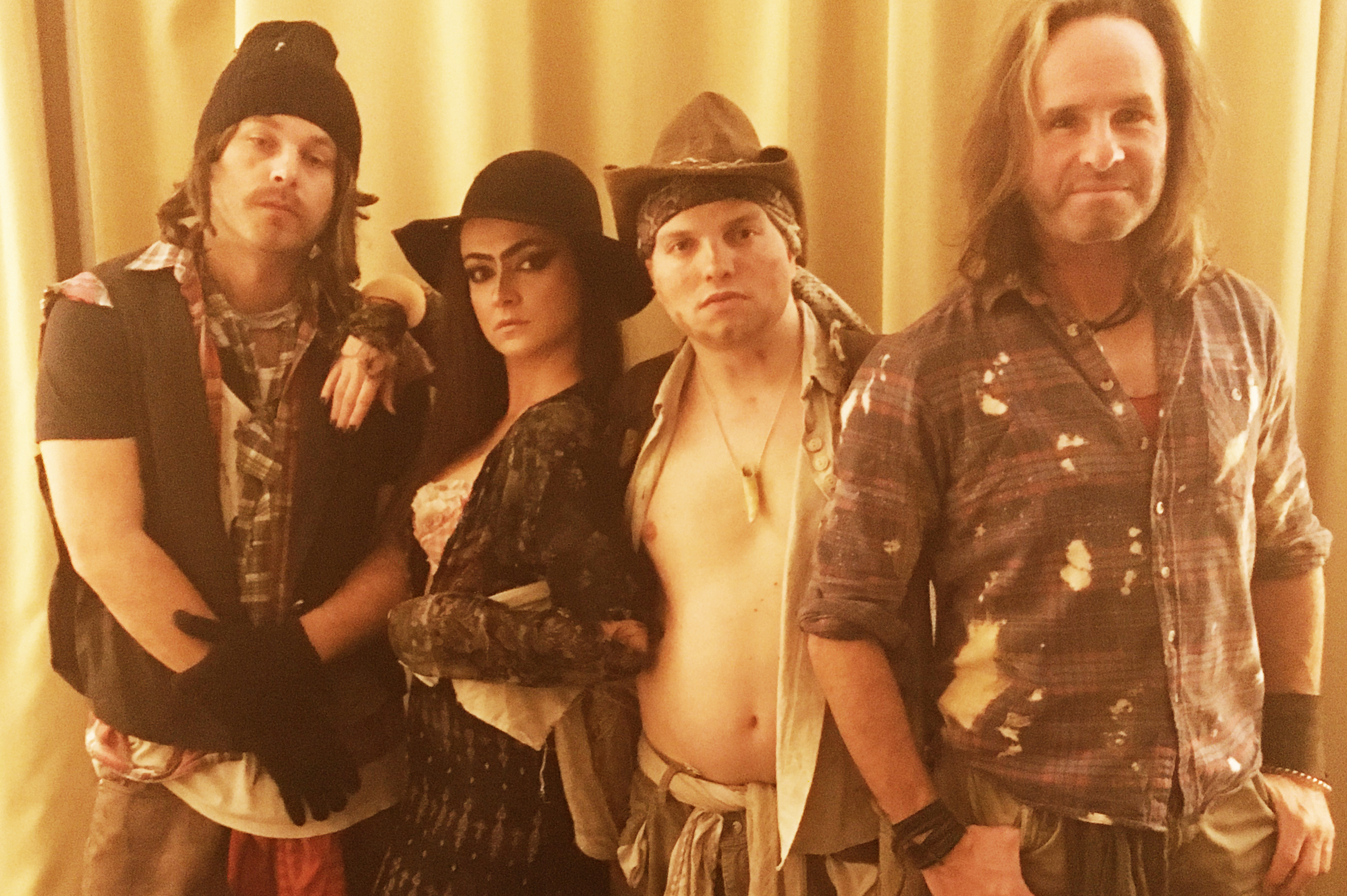
Swedish band Rednex (pictured in 2019) competed in the first semi-final with "Well-o-wee", finishing second with the televotes.

Interval acts for the first semi-final on 27 January included covers of the past Eurovision Song Contest entries "Volare" (Italy 1958), "Congratulations" (United Kingdom 1968), "What's Another Year" (Ireland 1980), "Diva" (Israel 1998) and "Everyway That I Can" (Turkey 2003) performed by Romanian artists such as Luminița Anghel and Taxi. Additionally, a boxing match between Anghel and native actress Luiza took place. Although scheduled to be performed in the fifth position at Selecția Națională, "Make-It" by Giulia Nahmany was disqualified due to accusations of plagiarising "Risin'" (2004) by Natalia. Todomondo, Rednex and Ro-Mania, and Morandi and Wassabi made up the top three of the televote. The results of the semi-final were:

Semi-final 1 – 27 January 2007
R/O	Artist	Song	Result
1	Morandi and Wassabi	"Crazy"	Advanced
2	Jasmine	"Music in My Soul"	—N/a
3	Spitalul de Urgență	"Stay United"	—N/a
4	Trupa Respect	"I Will Love You"	—N/a
5	Giulia Nahmany	"Make-It"	—
6	Daniela Răduică	"Nu insista"	—N/a
7	Desperado and Tony Poptămaș	"Where Were You"	Advanced
8	New Effect and Moni-K	"Sinada"	Advanced
9	Todomondo	"Liubi, Liubi, I Love You"	Advanced
10	Rednex featuring Ro-Mania	"Well-o-wee"	Advanced
11	Nico	"Dulce-amăruie"	Advanced
12	Gabi Huiban	"Rubber Girl"	—N/a

===== Semi-final 2 =====
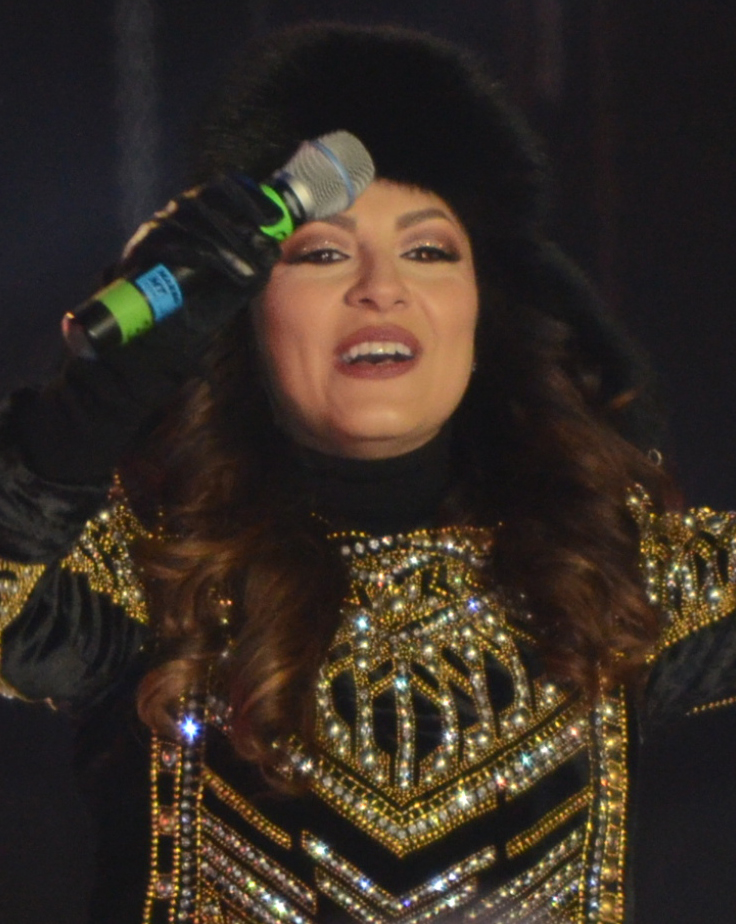
Romanian singer Andra competed in the second semi-final, being the most voted by the public with her entry "Dracula, My Love".

The second semi-final on 3 February had a television audience of 5,511,000 viewers and similarly had several covers of past Eurovision entries as interval acts, alongside another boxing match between two native celebrities. Although initially assigned to this semi-final, "Love Struck" by Indiggo was disqualified because the duo failed to attend rehearsals. Simplu and Andra were the televote's favorites, gathering more than 10,000 votes and around 8,000 more than the follow-up. The results of the event were:

Semi-final 2 – 3 February 2007
R/O	Artist	Song	Result
1	Moni-K	"În lumea mea"	—N/a
2	Simplu and Andra	"Dracula, My Love"	Advanced
3	Tibi Scobiola	"Nu pot să uit"	Advanced
4	Nico	"Love Is All You Need"	—N/a
5	Celia	"Șoapte"	—N/a
6	Ada	"You and Me"	—N/a
7	Wassabi	"Do the Tango with Me"	—N/a
8	Desperado and Tony Poptămaș	"European – a Beautiful Sin"	Advanced
9	Provincialii	"Time"	Advanced
10	Trupa Veche	"Deci 20"	Advanced
11	Marcel Pavel	"No poder vivir"	Advanced

===== Final =====
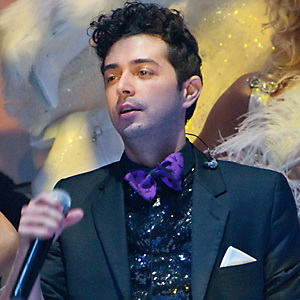
Multiple entries have been disqualified from the final of Selecția Națională, including two composed by Marius Moga (pictured in 2011).

Romanian group Sistem presented their single "Soare" as an interval act during the final of Selecția Națională on 10 February. "Dracula, My Love" by Simplu and Andra had been falsely suspected for plagiarising "When Religion Comes to Town" (1994) by E-Type, but was ultimately disqualified from the competition for having been partially performed by Simplu at the MTV Romania Music Awards 2006 prior to TVR's cutoff date of 1 October 2006. Similarly, New Effect and Moni-K's "Sinada" was disqualified for having received local radio airplay prior to the aforementioned date.

In addition, it was discovered that "Well-o-wee" by Rednex and Ro-Mania was a modified version of "Călușul", a song on the latter's 2001 album Lasă-mă să beau. This led to the entry's exclusion from Selecția Națională, alongside "Crazy" by Morandi and Wassabi, who failed to attend rehearsals. According to Marius Moga, the latter was a boycott due to the disqualification of "Dracula, My Love". The mass disqualification of songs generated controversy among observers. "Liubi, Liubi, I Love You" by Todomondo emerged as the winner, gathering the maximum 12 points from the public (11,243 televotes) and ten from the jury. The full results were as follows:

Final – 10 February 2007
R/O	Artist	Song	Jury	Televote	Total	Place
1	Nico	"Dulce-amăruie"	4	6	10	6
2	Trupa Veche	"Deci 20"	3	3	6	8
3	Morandi and Wassabi	"Crazy"	—	—	—	—
4	Marcel Pavel	"No poder vivir"	6	7	13	5
5	Desperado and Tony Poptămaș	"Where Were You"	12	5	17	2 (Note: Despite "Time" and "Where Were You" having reached the same total scores, the latter is ranked higher due to having been awarded more 12-point scores by the individual jury members.)
6	Tobi Scobiola	"Nu pot să uit"	5	4	9	7
7	Rednex featuring Ro-Mania	"Well-o-wee"	—	—	—	—
8	Simplu and Andra	"Dracula, My Love"	—	—	—	—
9	Todomondo	"Liubi, Liubi, I Love You"	10	12	22	1
10	Provincialii	"Time"	7	10	17	3
11	New Effect and Moni-K	"Sinada"	—	—	—	—
12	Desperado and Tony Poptămaș	"European – a Beautiful Sin"	8	8	16	4

== At Eurovision ==
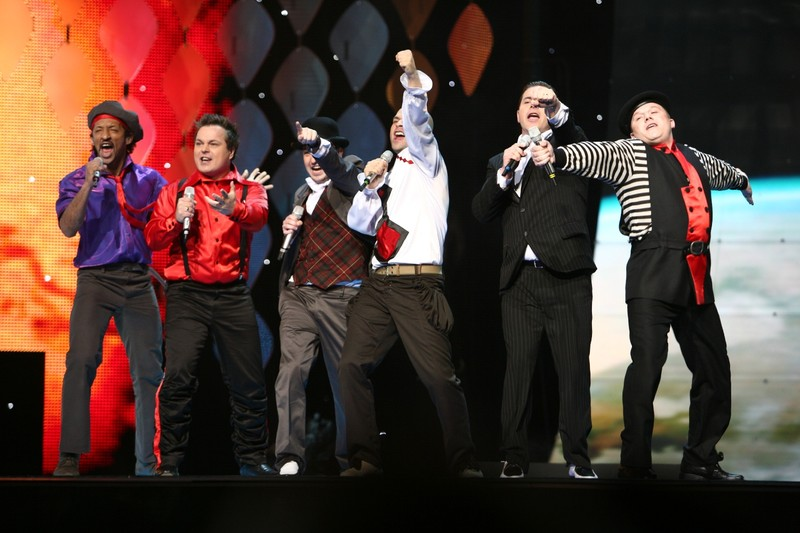
Todomondo performing at the final of the Eurovision Song Contest 2007.

To promote "Liubi, Liubi, I Love You" as Romania's Eurovision entry, a CD single was released in 2007 by TVR, followed by a promotional tour in Belarus. Additionally, Todomondo released a Dan Maoliu-directed music video and launched their own website in April 2007, in order to interact with fans and present them with news and biographical information. The Eurovision Song Contest 2007 took place at the Hartwall Arena in Helsinki, Finland and consisted of one semi-final on 10 May and the final on 12 May 2007. According to the then-Eurovision rules, selected countries, except the host nation and the "Big Four" (France, Germany, Spain and the United Kingdom), were required to qualify from the semi-final to compete for the final; the top ten countries from the semi-final progressed to the final.

In Romania, the show was broadcast on TVR, with Manoliu as the country's head of delegation. Todomondo were scheduled for technical rehearsals on 7 and 8 May, experiencing considerable malfunctions with the sound and graphics. Manoliu stated: "If the stage and the camera work will not fit our requirements, despite our efforts to help the team implement [them], we do not exclude the possibility of withdrawing from the competition". Automatically qualified for the final due to Romania's top ten placement the previous year, the group performed 20th on the occasion, preceded by the United Kingdom and followed by Bulgaria. Their show made use of pyrotechnics worth €5,000.

=== Voting ===
Below is a breakdown of points awarded to Romania in the Grand Final, as well as by the country in the semi-final and Grand Final of the contest. On the latter occasion, Romania finished in 13th position, being awarded a total of 84 points including 12 awarded by both Moldova and Spain, ten by Andorra, and eight by Hungary. The country awarded its 12 points to Moldova in the semi-final and Grand Final of the contest. For the announcement of the points, TVR appointed Andreea Marin Bănică as its spokesperson to announce the Romanian voting results.

==== Points awarded to Romania ====
Points awarded to Romania (Final)
Score	Country
12 points	Moldova; Spain
10 points	Andorra
8 points	Hungary
7 points	France; Israel; Portugal
6 points	
5 points	Cyprus
4 points	
3 points	Austria; Ireland
2 points	Bulgaria; Greece; Turkey; Ukraine
1 point	Latvia; Russia

==== Points awarded by Romania ====
Points awarded by Romania (Semi-final)
Score	Country
12 points	Moldova
10 points	Hungary
8 points	Turkey
7 points	Cyprus
6 points	Serbia
5 points	Latvia
4 points	Slovenia
3 points	Belarus
2 points	Macedonia
1 point	Bulgaria

Points awarded by Romania (Final)
Score	Country
12 points	Moldova
10 points	Greece
8 points	Hungary
7 points	Turkey
6 points	Serbia
5 points	Bulgaria
4 points	Ukraine
3 points	Russia
2 points	Latvia
1 point	Belarus
