= Aviator (Ukrainian band) =

Ukrainian band

AVIATOR
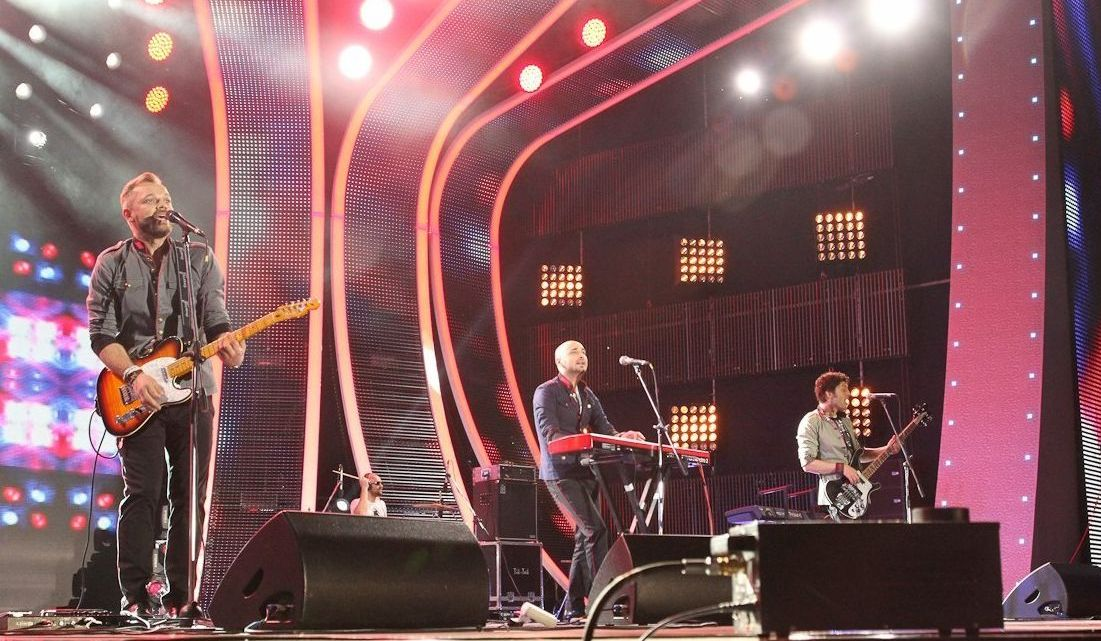
- Andriy Storozh, Dmytro Todoriuk

Background information
- Origin: Kyiv, Ukraine
- Genres: Pop
- Years active: 2005-present
- Labels: Mamamusic; Аstra Records; Aviator Music
- Members: Andriy Storozh; Dmytro Todoriuk
- Past members: Igor Voievutskyi
- Website: aviatorgroup.ua

AVIATOR (Ukrainian: Авіатор) is a Ukrainian band, which was formed in 2005 in Kyiv, Ukraine. From the beginning, the group occupied a niche of the romantic character of pop-music, and it still remains a leader of the field. The release of the debut album "V efire" ("On Air", Russian: "В эфире") made a splash on the national show-business market: for the first week, the band sold over 50,000 of copies, and, in total, the album has been sold in over 200,000 copies.

== History ==
=== Formation and First Years (since 2005) ===
The future members of the band Igor Voievutskyi and Dmytro Todoriuk got acquainted during the third season of "Shans" ("Chance", Ukrainian: "Шанс") TV-project in 2004. While on, the sound producer of the project was Yuriy Nikitin, a famous Ukrainian producer, and guys shared their idea to create a boys-band with him. To differ from another bands, it was decided to form a trio, so they invited Andriy Storozh to become the third member.

By the following members of the band – Igor Voievutskyi (guitar), Andriy Storozh (drums), Dmytro Todoriuk (keys) – on 29 May 2005 they played "Vozvraschaysia" ("Come Back", Russian: "Возвращайся") song for the very first time at the big open-air concert on European Square in Kyiv.

Later on, the band started to work with session musicians, so Andriy started to play keyboards, and Dmytro – bass guitar.

May, 29 is a date of the official formation of the AVIATOR band. At the same day, the band released their first "Vozvraschaysia" ("Come Back", Russian: "Возвращайся") video, which was on air of all Ukrainian musical channels.

The name "AVIATOR" was proposed by Storozh, because each member of the band, except music, has been interested in aviation: Igor collects children's models of airplanes, Dmytro has practiced skydiving, and Andriy is a fan of Martin Scorsese's movies, including The Aviator. Moreover, such a name conveyed the romantic direction of the band most accurately.

So, in 2005 the band started its activity under the guidance of the "Mamamusic" Production Center.

=== Albums and awards (2005–2009) ===
On 7 December 2005 the band released their first album V efire ("On Air", Russian: "В эфире""). The album had a great success: in the first 6 weeks, it was sold in more than 200,000 copies, and on 21 February 2006 the band was awarded with a Gold Album certificate for the large quantity of sales.

Three days after the award, the band started their first Ukrainian tour with such stars as Verka Serduchka, Iryna Bilyk and Mariia Burmaka. They visited 25 biggest cities of Ukraine.

In autumn 2006, the band received a "Showbiz AWARDS" in the "Best New Artist" category.

In summer 2007, their "Ryzhaya" ("Coppertop", Russian: "Рыжая") single entered the hit-parade of Russkoye Radio radio station and stayed there for 5 months in a row. At the same time, Aviator became a special guest of the Slavianski Bazaar in Vitebsk.

From 2005 to 2008 the group became a regular winner of the Song of the Year festival.

In general, the band released 3 albums and 2 re-issues: "V efire" ("On Air", Russian: "В эфире") (2005), "V efire. Zolotoy al’bom" ("On Air. Golden Album", Russian: "В эфире. Золотой альбом") (2006), "Maniia" ("Mania", Russian: "Мания") (2006), "GreenManiia" ("GreenMania", Russian: "GreenМания") (2007), "Solntce Arizony" ("The Sun of Arizona", Russian: "Солнце Аризоны") (2008).

AVIATOR has experiences in creating cover versions and remakes. The new version of the famous song "Trava u doma" ("Grass Near the Home", Russian: "Трава у дома"), made by the band, became an undisputed hit. In 2009, for their version of the song, guys were awarded with the "Golden Gramophone". In addition, during the concert program, listeners can hear remakes of such songs as "Pis’ma izdaleka" ("Letters From Far Away", Russian: "Письма издалека") and "You're in the Army Now".

=== New Achievements (2012 – 20 June 2018) ===
In 2012 AVIATOR and the executives of "Mamamusic" Production Center decided to part their ways. Even after that, the rights to use the name of the band and to perform the songs were left to the band (which is a phenomenon in Ukrainian show-business).

The head of the company, Yuriy Nikitin, commented on this situation:

AVIATOR is a great band, each member is a fully formed creative person, ready to work independently. There are no analogues of the band in Ukraine, and it confirms a genuine interest of their fans to all kinds of band's creative activity.

The band continues to tour, record new songs, and shoot video works under its own label "Aviator Music".

On 29 May 2018, on the 13th birthday of AVIATOR, one of the stars of the constellation "Gemini" received the name "Gurt AVIATOR".

AVIATOR became the first singers of the Ukrainian show-business, who performed a concert aboard a plane at an altitude of 10,000 meters. It took place in the framework of the press-flight "Kyiv-Lublin" by "Bravo Airways".

=== Newest History of AVIATOR (20 June 2018 – present) ===
In the summer of 2018, the frontline of AVIATOR stunned their fans with unexpected news: the composition of the group changed. From now on, two frontmen took control of the musical "airliner": Dmytro Todoriuk and Andriy Storozh. According to the participants themselves, even such a difficult stage of the band's development passed without a quarrel and a loud scandal:

Having talked frankly to the three, we decided that Igor would create his own story and we would continue to fly AVIATOR for two of us. Our friendship does not interfere with it at all. Life is an interesting thing: who knows what news we will surprise later? But we guarantee surely: the energy and emotions that AVIATOR always gives is inviolable!

The first concert performance in the band's new was held on 18 August 2018 at the Shyroke (Ukrainian: Широке, Russian: Широкое) Aerodrome in Zaporizhzhya within the framework of the "MUZYKA TA NEBO" ("MUSIC'N'SKY", Ukrainian: "МУЗИКА ТА НЕБО") Air Fest.

The official release of the "Nebo na dvoh" ("Heaven a Deux", Ukrainian: "Небо на двох") single was the starting point for a new creative career of the band. The author of the track is one of the soloists of AVIATOR Dmytro Todoriuk. Subsequently, along with the singer Bozhena Dar AVIATOR presented the anthem of the bridegroom "Narechena" ("Bride", Ukrainian: "Наречена").

== Members ==
=== Frontmen ===
- Andriy Storozh – lead vocal, keys
- Dmytro Todoriuk – lead vocal, acoustic guitar
- Igor Voievutskyi – lead vocal, guitar (until 20 June 2018)

=== Session musicians ===
- Anton Schelkonogov – drums (2005–2006)
- Denys Haritonov – drums (2006–2013)
- Iryna Kristinina – back-vocal (2007–2009)
- Eve Bushmina – back-vocal (2007–2008)
- Mariia Kulish – back-vocal (2008–2013)
- Sergiy Baginskiy – solo-guitar (2012–2014)
- Kyrylo Boldyriev – drums (2013–present)
- Evgen Naumov – solo-guitar (2014–2016)
- Sergiy Goray – bass-guitar (2014–2016)
- Viacheslav Tatar – solo-guitar (2016–present)
- Dmytro Bem – bass-guitar (2018–present)
- Oleksandra Vdovichenko – back-vocal (2018–present)

== Discography ==
- "V efire" ("On Air", Russian: "В эфире") (2005)
- "V efire. Zolotoy al’bom" ("On Air. Golden Album", Russian: "В эфире. Золотой альбом") (2006)
- "Maniia" ("Mania", Russian: "Мания") (2006)
- "GreenManiia" ("GreenMania", Russian: "GreenМания") (2007)
- "Solntce Arizony" ("The Sun of Arizona", Russian: "Солнце Аризоны") (2008)
- "Evolutsiia" ("Evolution", Ukrainian: "Еволюція") (2014)
- "EVO (ReMix)" (2015)

== Videos ==
#	Name	Year	Director	Album
1	Vozvraschaysia	2005	Igor and Oleksandr Stekolenko	On Air
2	Podarok	2005	Oleksandr Filatovych	On Air
3	Berega	2005	Oleksandr Filatovych	On Air
4	Mania	2006	Oleksandr Filatovych	Mania
5	Liven' navsegda	2006	Evgen Tymohin	Mania
6	Trava y doma	2007	Evgen Tymohin	The Sun of Arizona
7	Ryzhaya	2007	Viktor Skuratovskiy	The Sun of Arizona
8	Za vysokimi berezami	2008	Viktor Skuratovskiy	The Sun of Arizona
9	Den' rozhdeniia	2008	Viktor Skuratovskiy	The Sun of Arizona
10	Za toboy	2009	Oleksandr Filatovych	Single
11	Bez tebia	2010	Sergiy Tkachenko	Single
12	Vesna	2011	Sergiy Tkachenko	Single
13	Zvezda	2011	Sergiy Tkachenko	Single
14	Geroi	2012	Dmytro Todoriuk	Single
15	Vnov' k tebe	2012	Pavlo Kogut	Single
16	Ne uderzhat'	2013	Dmytro Peretrutov	Single
17	Zapreschaiu	2013	Oleksandr Ivanenko	Single
18	Devochka	2015	Dmytro Todoriuk	Single
19	V tvoih glazah	2016	Dmytro Todoriuk	Single
20	Ostanniy lyst	2016	Alina Dianova	Single
21	Ya znaiu	2017	Viktor Skuratovskiy	Single
22	Seti	2018	Viktor Skuratovskiy	Single
23	Narechena (feat. Bozhena Dar)	2018	Radislav Lukin	Single
24	Nebo na dvoh	2018	Radislav Lukin	Single

== Awards ==
- Song of the Year" (2005–2008)
- Gold Album" (2006)
- Showbiz AWARDS" "Best New Artist" (2006)
