= Liubi, Liubi, I Love You =

2007 song performed by Todomondo

Single by Todomondo
- Released: 2007
- Length: 3:02
- Label: TVR
- Songwriter(s): Bogdan Tașcău; Vlad Crețu; Kamara Ghedi
- Producer(s): Bogdan Tașcău

Eurovision Song Contest 2007 entry
- Country: Romania
- Artist(s): Andrei Ștefănescu; Ciro de Luca; Kamara Ghedi; Bogdan Tașcău; Valeriu Răileanu; Vlad Crețu
- As: Todomondo
- Languages: English; Romanian; Spanish; Italian; French; Russian
- Composer(s): Bogdan Tașcău
- Lyricist(s): Bogdan Tașcău; Kamara Ghedi; Valeriu Răileanu; Andrei Ștefănescu; Ciro de Luca; Vlad Crețu

Finals performance
- Final result: 13th
- Final points: 84

Entry chronology
- ◄ "Tornerò" (2006)
- "Pe-o margine de lume" (2008) ►

"Liubi, Liubi, I Love You" (English: "Love, Love, I Love You") is a song recorded by Romanian group Todomondo, consisting of Andrei Ștefănescu, Ciro de Luca, Kamara Ghedi, Bogdan Tașcău, Valeriu Răileanu and Vlad Crețu. It was released as a CD single in 2007 by the Romanian Television (TVR) in Romania. The track is multilingual and is performed in six languages: English, Romanian, Spanish, Italian, French and Russian. Tașcău produced the song and co-wrote it with Crețu and Ghedi. Its lyrics deal with the theme of love and European clichés.

"Liubi, Liubi, I Love You" represented Romania in the Eurovision Song Contest 2007, held in Helsinki, Finland after winning the pre-selection show Selecția Națională. In Helsinki, Romania automatically qualified to the final due to their top ten placement in the previous year and finished in 13th place with 84 points. "Liubi, Liubi, I Love You" was promoted through performances in Belarus and a music video shot in Romania by Dan Manoliu. It charted at number 82 on the Romanian Top 100.

== Background and release ==
Todomondo, initially named Locomondo, was a Romanian group consisting of Andrei Ștefănescu, Ciro de Luca, Kamara Ghedi, Bogdan Tașcău, Valeriu Răileanu and Vlad Crețu. The band was formed in 2007, with each of its members having had notable success in the Romanian music industry beforehand. Their song "Liubi, Liubi, I Love You" was written by Tașcău, Crețu and Ghedi, and was solely produced by Tașcău. It emerged from the idea of Răileanu, and was originally intended for Ștefănescu and Ghedi's band Alb Negru. The track was concepted in August 2007 and finalised months later in the span of two days. "Liubi, Liubi, I Love You" is a multilingual song performed in six languages: English, Romanian, Spanish, Italian, French and Russian. During an interview with website Eurovision Belarus, one member of Todomondo jokingly stated: "We wanted to add even more languages to the song: we wanted to sing in German, Japanese, Chinese, Hindi... But unfortunately, we couldn't put it in the three-minute limit allowed by Eurovision."

The lyrics of "Liubi, Liubi, I Love You" deal with the theme of love and discuss European clichés. Todomondo further elaborated on the track's message: "The feeling of love is the same in all countries, and it is not important what language you speak, what nationality you are, we all understand the same feeling under the word 'love'." During the song, each of the members represent one country and sing in one of the aforementioned languages: Tașcău stands for Spain, Crețu for the United Kingdom, Ghedi for France, Ștefănescu for Romania, de Luca for Italy and Răileanu for Russia. "Liubi, Liubi, I Love You" was released as a CD single in Romania in 2007 by the Romanian Television (TVR), followed by a promotional tour in Belarus. The CD's cover artwork was photographed by Zoltan Lorencz. Also aided by a music video shot in Romania by Dan Manoliu, "Liubi, Liubi, I Love You" charted at number 82 on the Romanian Top 100.

== At Eurovision ==
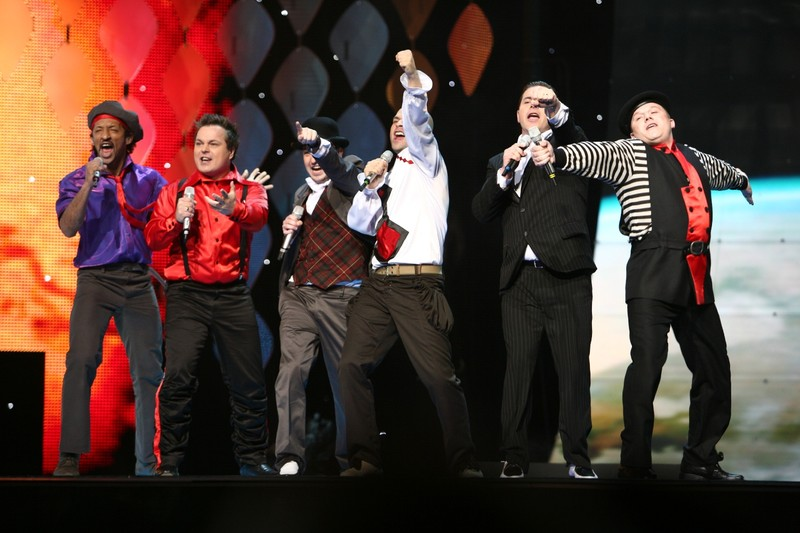
Todomondo performing at the Eurovision Song Contest 2007

The Selecția Națională was held in order to select the Romanian entrant for the Eurovision Song Contest 2007, consisting of two semi-finals on 27 January and 3 February, respectively, and the final on 10 February 2007. Todomondo qualified in first place from the first semi-final after the votes of an expert jury panel and the televoting were combined, resulting in 24 points. Subsequently, "Liubi, Liubi, I Love You" was chosen to represent in Romania in the contest by the same voting system, gathering 22 points in the final.

The Eurovision Song Contest 2007 took place at the Hartwall Arena in Helsinki, Finland and consisted of one semi-final on 10 May and the final on 12 May 2007. According to the then-Eurovision rules, selected countries, except the host country and the "Big Four" (France, Germany, Spain and the United Kingdom), were required to qualify from the semi-final to compete for the final; the top ten countries from the semi-final progressed to the final. Automatically qualified for the final due to Romania's top ten placement the previous year, Todomondo performed 20th on the occasion, preceded by the United Kingdom and followed by Bulgaria. Romania eventually came in 13th position with 84 points, consisting of 12 awarded by both Moldova and Spain, 10 by Andorra and eight by Hungary.

== Track listing ==
- Romanian CD single
1. "Liubi, Liubi, I Love You" – 3:02

== Credits and personnel ==
Credits adapted from the liner notes of the CD single.

- Vlad Crețu – lead vocals, songwriter
- Kamara Ghedi – lead vocals, songwriter
- Bogdan Tașcău – lead vocals, songwriter, producer
- Zoltan Lorencz – photography
- Ciro de Luca – lead vocals
- Valeriu Răileanu – lead vocals
- Andrei Ștefănescu – lead vocals

== Release history ==
| Country | Date | Format | Label |
|---|---|---|---|
| Romania | 2007 | CD single | TVR |
