= Sonny Flame =

- Born: Mihai Răzvan Preda; Ploiești, Romania
- Genres: Reggae, dance hall, R&B, Latin music
- Occupation: Singer
- Years active: 2006–present
- Labels: Independent
- Website: https://youtube.com/@sonnyflameofficial?si=JBTwyoq2dRdI1LD0

Mihai Răzvan Preda (Romanian pronunciation: [miˈhaj rəzˈvan ˈpreda]; better known by his stage name Sonny Flame, is a Romanian reggae, dance hall, and R&B singer. He is an independent artist.

== Career ==
In 2006 he finished his first album-length demo, together with producer F.Charm. He collaborated very early on with Romanian artist Wassabi in "Lonely Girl". He also collaborated with well-known names like Connect-R in "Summer Days", DJ Chris Mayer in "Confused" and Mossano in "Indianotech".

This culminated in signing with Red Clover, a young Romanian label where F.Charm is A&R Manager. His first official single on Red Clover was "Top of the World" with DJ Chris Mayer. It was licensed through ToCo International and released in France, Sweden, Denmark, Norwege, Netherlands, Russia as well. The single reached No. 3 on Romanian Vibe FM charts.

He was featured in Morris hit "Havana Lover". In 2011, he was the opening act for Ja Rule in his tour in Romania. In 2012 he had a hit with "Sole el sol" which enjoys huge popularity in night clubs and online. It is also Sonny Flame's first Spanish language hit.

== In popular culture ==
- In March 2010, he took in the Romanian National Selection contest in a bid to represent Romania in the Eurovision Song Contest with the song "Come Along" as a duo with Lora. The song was written by Lora and Sonny and music by F.Charm and Pol. The song came 6th in Romanian eliminations "Selecţia Naţională 2010" on TVR1.
- Sonny Flame became well known in the United States due to two of his songs. His song "Glamity" was featured on Akon's weekly radio show to battle with other entries and brought in a very high 82.8% on the DHS (Dynamic Hit Scoring) scale of Hitlab. The song was also featured in Toronto's Virgin 99.9 FM that broadcast the program "Akon's Hitlab" naming Sonny Flame as its "featured artist" for four days. "Jump Up" was also featured in Akon's Hitlab, and in its second week faced in an all-Romanian battle with another Romanian hit "Asesina" by F.Charm. "Jump Up" scored even a higher 93% on the DHS scale. He also submitted yet a third hit "I Gotta Find You" which scored 76.4%.
- In its September 2010 issue, the influential lifestyle magazine Revista COSMOPOLITAN Romania ran an exclusive interview with him calling him "Sonny Flame, noua senzatie din muzica romaneasca" (meaning "Sonny Flame, the new sensation of Romanian music" in English).
- In 2013, he took part in the Romanian version of the TV reality show Celebrity Splash! entitled Splash! Vedete la Apă and broadcast on Antena 1 reaching the final of the show in its first season.
- Also dubbed in Romanian Jim voice in the animated movie – Treasure Planet.

== Discography ==
=== Albums ===
Year	Album and details	Track listing
2012	Way of life: Date of release: 26 November 2012; Format: CD, downloads; Record label: Red Clover Media	1. "Sale el Sol" (3:20); 2. "Like a Breeze" (3:36); 3. "Liber" (3:09); 4. "It's My Life" (2:57); 5. "Woman" (3:18); 6. "Get in My Bed" (3:43); 7. "Another Day" (3:30); 8. "Jump Up" (feat. DJ Dark) (3:10); 9. "Lady" (3:09); 10. "Boom Boom Room" (feat. Kenno) (3:00); 11. "Vin" (3:24); 12. "Miami Day" (3:13); 13. "Get Your Clothes Off" (3:22); 14. "Sale el Sol" (Emil Lassaria remix) (6:08); 15. Digital Booklet "Way of Life"

=== Songs ===
- 2010: "Top of the World" (feat. Chris Mayer)
- 2010: "Come Along" (with Lora) (at Selecţia Naţională Eurovision 2010)
- 2010: "Glamity"
- 2010: "Jump Up" (feat. DJ Dark)
- 2011: "I Gotta Find You"
- 2011: "Summer Days" (with Connect-R)
- 2011: "Get Your Cloths Off"
- 2012: "African Sun"
- 2012: "Sale el sol"
- 2012: "Like a Breeze"
- 2012: "Boom Boom Room" (feat. Kenno)
- 2012: "Get in my Bed"
- 2012: "Another Day"
- 2012: "It's My Life"
- 2012: "Lady"
- 2012: "Woman"
- 2012: "Miami Day"
- 2013: "Vin"
- 2013: "Loca Pasion"
- 2014: "Colac de salvare"
- 2014: "Pune-mă-n cap"
- 2015: "Contigo"
- 2017: "Rumba"
- 2018: "Print si cersetor" (feat. Connect-R)
- 2019: "Da-le"

=== Featured in ===
- 2009: "Confused" (Chris Mayer) feat. Sonny Flame)
- 2009: "Havana Lover" (Morris feat. Sonny Flame)
- 2010: "Lonely Girl" (Wassabi feat. Sonny Flame)
- 2011: "Around the World" (Claudette feat. Sonny Flame)
- 2012: "Like That" (Style Da Kid feat. Mike Diamondz, Sonny Flame, Johnny King, OneShot, Violet & Anda D)
- 2013: "IUBI" (Andreea Balan feat. Sonny Flame)
- 2014: "POC" (Tara feat. Sonny Flame)
- 2015: "Alt Inceput" (Nico feat. Sonny Flame)
- 2016: "Booty Clap" (LLP feat. Sonny Flame)
- 2016: "Criminal" (Mario Morreti feat. Sonny Flame)
