= Tornerò (Mihai Trăistariu song) =

2006 song by Mihai Trăistariu

- Cover for Romanian and Greek CD single.

Single by Mihai Trăistariu

from the album Tornerò
- Language: English; Italian
- English title: "I Will Return"
- Released: 3 July 2006
- Recorded: January 2006
- Studio: Art Music (Bucharest, Romania)
- Genre: Disco; pop; dance; rave
- Length: 3:00
- Label: CMC
- Songwriters: Cristian Hriscu; Mihaela Deac; Eduard Cîrcotă
- Producer: Eduard Cîrcotă

Music video
- "Tornerò" on YouTube

Eurovision Song Contest 2006 entry
- Country: Romania
- Artist: Mihai Trăistariu

Finals performance
- Final result: 4th
- Final points: 172

Entry chronology
- ◄ "Let Me Try" (2005)
- "Liubi, Liubi, I Love You" (2007) ►

Official performance video
- "Tornerò" (Final) on YouTube

"Tornerò" (Italian: [torneˈrɔ]; "I Will Return") is a song by Romanian singer Mihai Trăistariu from his eighth studio album of the same name (2006). Released by CMC Entertainment on 3 July 2006, it was written by Cristian Hriscu, Mihaela Deac and its producer Eduard Cîrcotă. With English verses and a refrain in Italian, "Tornerò" is a disco, pop, dance and rave song featuring Trăistariu using his higher vocal range. The track won the Selecția Națională pre-selection show and represented Romania in the Eurovision Song Contest 2006, held in Athens, Greece. There, the singer was pre-qualified for the Grand Final, where he finished fourth with 172 points. On stage, three male and two female dancers from Romanian dance group Big Bounce accompanied Trăistariu, performing a mixture of ballet and contemporary dance.

Music critics gave generally positive reviews of the song, praising its catchiness and the singer's vocal delivery. "Tornerò" received airplay in various countries and chartwise peaked at number thirty-eight on the Romanian Top 100, and reached the top ten in Finland and Greece, as well as the top forty in Sweden. The song was also awarded a prize by Romanian magazine V.I.P and received nominations at the Greek MTV Music Awards, Romanian Top Hits Awards and Radio România Actualități Awards. The promotion of "Tornerò" consisted of various live performances and endeavours, as well as the release of an accompanying music video in 2006. Artists such as Greek singer Anna Vissi and Romanian recording artist Lora have covered the track.

== Background and release ==
A disco, pop, dance and rave song whose verses are in English and refrain in Italian, "Tornerò" was written by Cristian Hriscu, Mihaela Deac and Eduard Cîrcotă, and produced solely by Cîrcotă. It was recorded at Art Music Studio in Bucharest in January 2006. Throughout the song, Trăistariu uses his higher vocal range. Writing for National Post, Sean Carrie compared "Tornerò" to the works of American singer Ricky Martin and Trinidadian-German performer Haddaway. The track was released for digital download on 3 July 2006 by CMC Entertainment through the iTunes Store, lasting three minutes, and was later included on his eighth studio album Tornerò (2006).

== Critical reception and recognition ==
"Tornerò" song was one of the favourites to win the Eurovision Song Contest by both fans and Billboard's Fred Bronson, and ascended on betting odds. An editor of Antena 1 called the track a "phenomenon", while an editor of Libertatea wrote that "Tornerò" remains "the best-known song by a Romanian artist at Eurovision". An author of Tribune Business News considered it "probably has one of the most haunting refrains among all the Romanian [Eurovision entries]". Including the single at number four in their list of "Eurovision [2006]: Top 10 Tips", BBC praised Trăistariu's vocals as "soaring", as well as the song as "the most contemporary offering [in the contest]". The website further wrote: "Something about this makes it hard to forget – a very high scorer." Ioana Matfeev of Top Românesc slightly criticised Trăistariu's diction in the song. In a 2016 poll on Wiwibloggs called "What is your favourite Eurovision song from Romania?", it finished in fourth place with over 500 votes. According to Giannis Argyriou of EuroVisionary, "Tornerò" remained popular among Eurovision viewers, while fans of the song include Romanian singer Alexa and Romanian music critic Liviu Zamora; the latter praised Trăistariu's emotional delivery.

== Commercial performance and accolades ==
"Tornerò" received airplay in over thirty countries after its release, and attained commercial success in over 20, including multiple European territories such as Greece. The song was also well received by the gay community and was played in European gay clubs. It was also given notable airplay by a radio station in San Francisco, California. Chartwise, "Tornerò" peaked at number thirty-eight on the native Romanian Top 100, and at number four in Greece. It debuted and peaked at number eight on Finland's Suomen virallinen lista chart in the week ending 17 September 2006. The song also entered the Swedish Sverigetopplistan chart at number 49 on 21 September 2006, and rose to number 21 over the next two editions, lasting for a total of fourteen non-consecutive weeks. The commercial success of "Tornerò" positively influenced the trajectory of Trăistariu's career. The song sold several digital downloads in Greece and generated incomes of over €2.5 million along with other promotional endeavours. "Tornerò" received a prize from Romanian V.I.P magazine and was nominated for an award at the Greek MTV Music Awards in 2006. In the same year, the song received a nomination at the Romanian Top Hits Awards in the Boys – Best Hit category. Trăistariu also won Artist of the Year and received a nomination in the Best Dance-Pop Song category at the 2007 Radio România Actualități Awards.

== Promotion and other usage ==
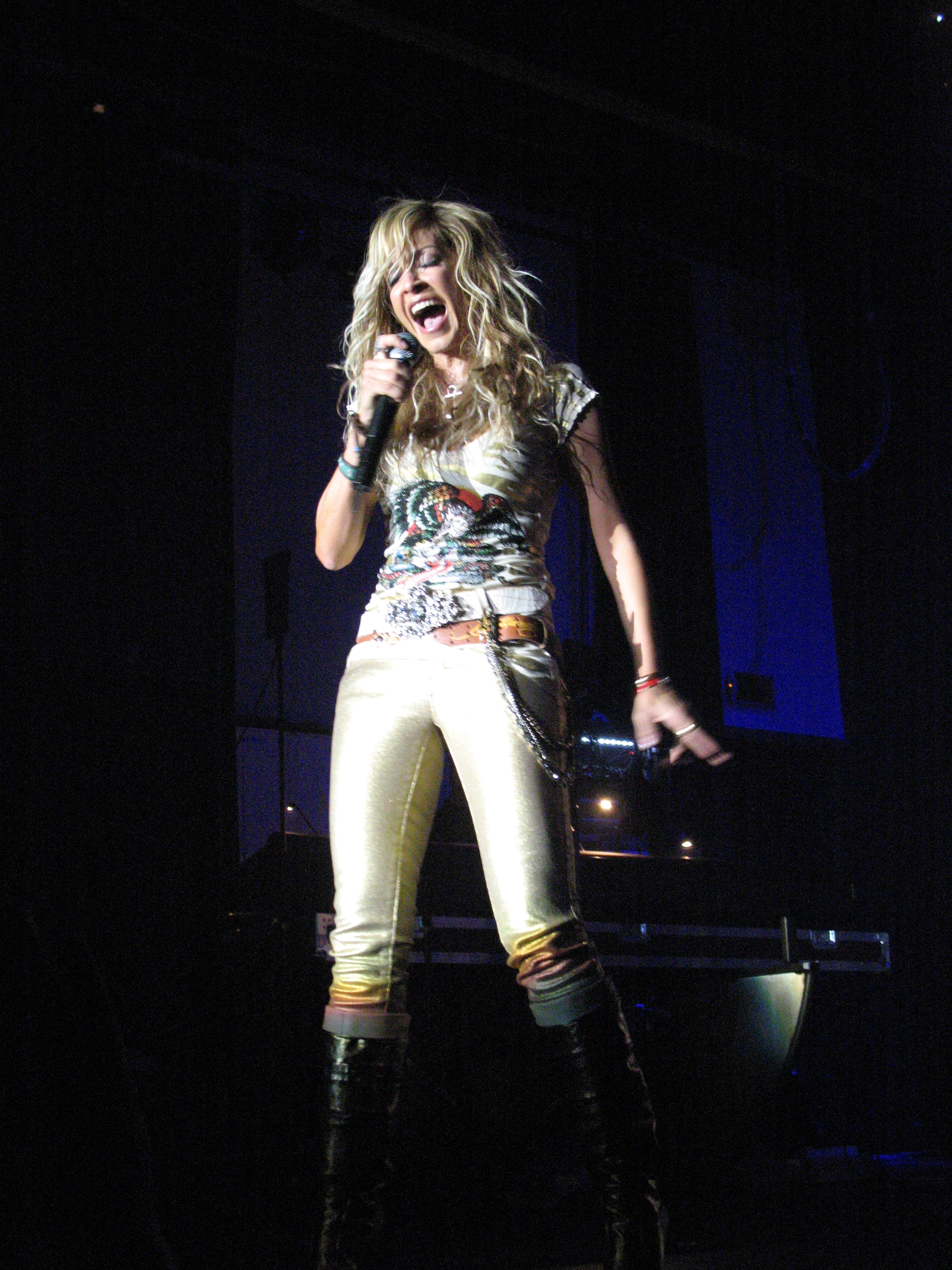
Greek singer Anna Vissi (pictured in 2007) recorded a cover version of "Tornerò".

Trăistariu made appearances to perform "Tornerò" on multiple occasions throughout the years, along with other endeavours. An accompanying music video for the song was also filmed sometime in 2006, with it being included on a CD release of the track in the same year. The visual portrays the singer lip synching to "Tornerò" while walking in a hallway with dancers and other people, occasionally interacting with them and joining their activities. Trăistariu recorded a duet version of the song with Greek singer Tamta titled "Tornerò, Tromero", while covers were done by artists including Greek recording artist Anna Vissi, and Romanian singer Lora during Romanian television show Te cunosc de undeva!.

== Eurovision ==
=== National selection ===
On 26 February, the Selecția Națională was organised by Romanian Television (TVR) to select its song and performer for the 51st edition of the Eurovision Song Contest. "Tornerò" was chosen after the votes of a professional jury panel (12) and public televoting (10) were combined, resulting in 22 points. Prior to being selected to represent his country at Eurovision, Trăistariu had participated in the Romanian national selection multiple times. Romanian-American singing-songwriting duo Indiggo, who placed seventh with their song "Be My Boyfriend", sparked controversy after demanding €100,000 from TVR for allegedly not being votable by fans due to continuously busy lines. Their allegation was turned down by TVR.

=== In Athens ===
The Eurovision Song Contest 2006 took place at the O.A.C.A. Olympic Indoor Hall in Athens, Greece and consisted of one semi-final on 18 May, and the final on 20 May 2006. According to the then-Eurovision rules, selected countries, except the host country and the "Big Four" (France, Germany, Spain and the United Kingdom), were required to qualify from the semi-final to compete for the final; the top ten countries from the semi-final progressed to the final. In 2006, Romania automatically qualified to the final due to the top 11 result last year, where Trăistariu performed in 12th place, preceded by Macedonia and followed by Bosnia and Herzegovina. At the close of the voting, it had received 172 points, finishing in fourth position and thus qualifying the country for the final in the next contest. "Tornerò" received points from 35 countries with Moldova and Spain awarding the maximum 12 points to the entry.

Onstage, Trăistariu was accompanied by three male and two female dancers from Romanian dance group Big Bounce, who performed choreography done by Romanian singer and choreographer CRBL. It contained elements from both ballet and contemporary dance, and was meant to "highlight [...] Trăistariu's song and voice." Over the course of the preparations, dancers were partially replaced. Romania's first rehearsal took place on 15 May 2006 to positive reactions from the audience. Various changes concerning the staging were also made on the same occasion. In a review of Trăistariu's show, Caroline Briggs of BBC compared his look to a "ginger" Justin Timberlake.

== Track listing ==
- Digital download
1. "Tornerò" – 3:00
- Greek CD single
1. "Tornerò" – 3:00
2. "Tornerò" (Cre8 Remix) – 4:02
3. "Tornerò" (Almud Tech Remix) – 4:45
4. "Tornerò" (Music Video) – 3:00
- Scandinavian/Romanian CD single
1. "Tornerò" – 3:00
2. "Tornerò" (Cre8 Remix) – 4:02
3. "Tornerò" (Almud Tech Remix) – 4:45

== Charts ==
=== Weekly charts ===
Chart (2006)	Peak position
Finland (Suomen virallinen lista)	8
Greece (IFPI Greece)	4
Romania (Romanian Top 100)	38
Sweden (Sverigetopplistan)	21

=== Year-end charts ===
Chart (2006)	Position
Sweden (Sverigetopplistan)	100

== Release history ==
Territory	Date	Format(s)	Label
United Kingdom	3 July 2006	Digital download	CMC
Scandinavia	N/A 2006	CD single	Warner
Greece	N/A 2006	Enhanced CD	Capitol/ Planetworks
Romania	N/A 2006	CD single	Chips
