= Tamta discography =

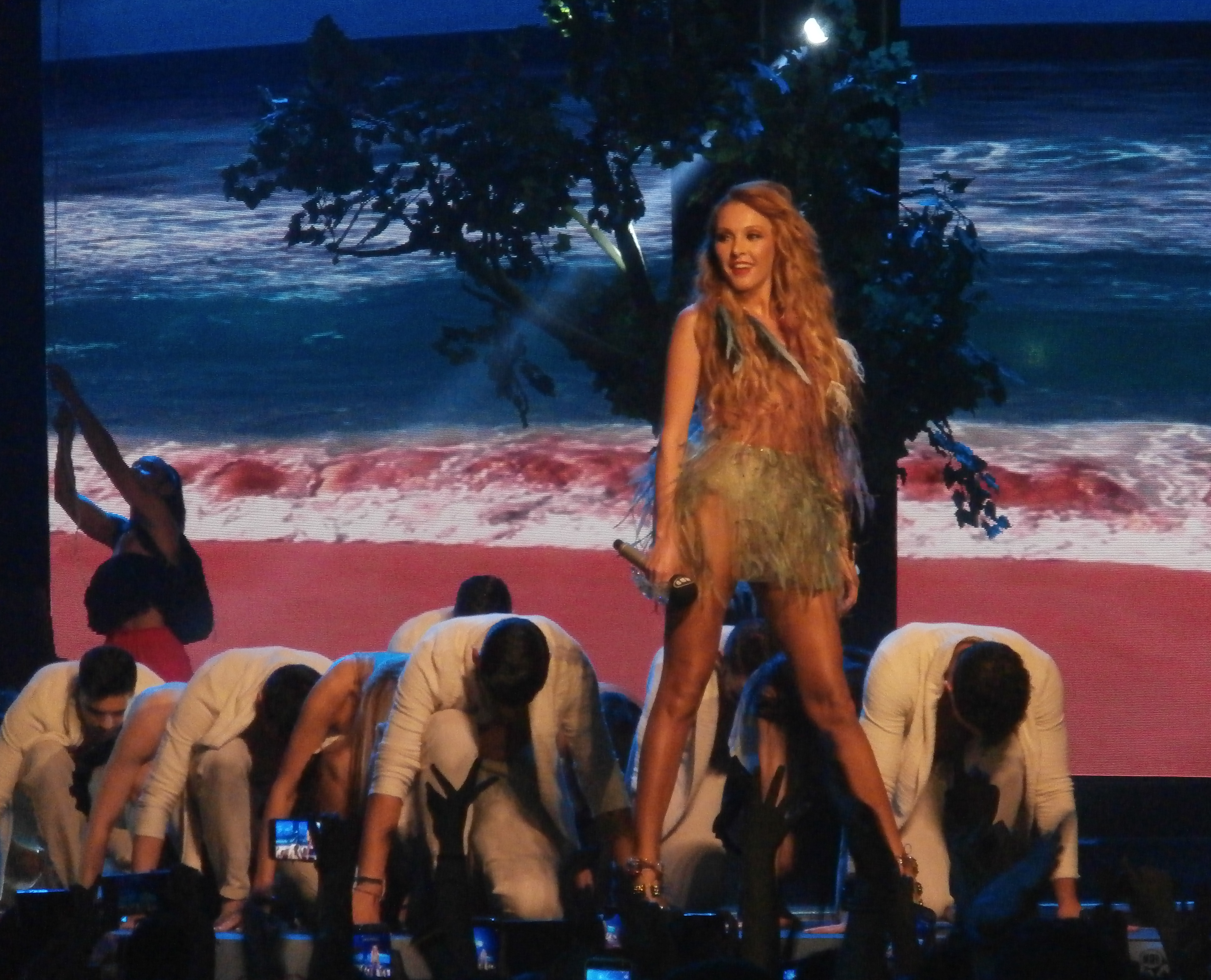
- Studio albums: 5
- Singles: 51
- Music videos: 44

The discography of Georgian-born Greek singer Tamta.

== Albums ==
=== Studio albums ===
Title	Details
Tamta	Released: 14 February 2006; Label: EMI; Format: Digital download, CD
Agapise Me	Released: 16 May 2007; Label: EMI; Format: Digital download, CD
Tharros I Alitheia	Released: 2010; Label: EMI; Format: Digital download, CD
Identity Crisis	Released: 2 June 2023; Label: EMI; Format: Digital download, CD
THE VILLAIN HEROINE	Released: 17 June 2025; Label: Kiki Music/EMI; Format: Digital download, CD

=== Compilation albums ===
Title	Details
Best of Tamta	Released: 2017; Label: EMI; Format: Digital download, CD

== Extended plays ==
=== Studio EPs ===
Title	Details
Awake	Released: 3 July 2020; Label: Minos EMI; Format: Digital download
THE VILLAIN	Released: November 2024; Label: Minos EMI; Format: Digital download
THE HEROINE	Released: April 2025; Label: Kiki Music/EMI; Format: Digital download

=== Live EPs ===
Title	Details
LIVE MUTATIONS with Contemporary Music Orchestra of ERT	Released: February 2026; Label: Kiki Music/EMI; Format: Digital Download

== Singles ==
=== As lead artist ===
Title	Year	Peak chart positions		Album
Title	Year	GRE	SWE	Album
"T' Allo Mou Miso" (with Stavros Konstantinou)	2004	—	—	Non-album single
"Ftais (Faraway)"	2006	18	—	Tamta
"Den Telionei Etsi I Agapi"	2006	8	—	Tamta
"Einai Krima" (with Grigoris Petrakos)	2006	—	—	Tamta
"With Love"	2007	2	—	Agapise Me
"Agapise Me"	2007	15	—	Agapise Me
"Relax, Take It Easy / Agapise Me (MAD Version)"	2007	—	—	Agapise Me
"Agapo (Wanna Play)" (featuring Akis Deiximos)	2007	—	—	Agapise Me
"Mia Stigmi Esi Ki Ego"	2007	27	—	Agapise Me
"Ela Sto Rhythmo"	2008	25	—	Agapise Me
"Koita Me"	2009	15	—	Tharros I Alitheia
"Tharros I Alitheia" (featuring Sakis Rouvas)	2009	—	—	Tharros I Alitheia
"Egoista" (featuring Isaias Matiaba)	2010	—	—	Tharros I Alitheia
"Fotia"	2010	—	—	Tharros I Alitheia
"Zise To Apistefto (Oblivion)"	2011	6	—	Best of Tamta
"Niose Tin Kardia"	2012	—	—	Best of Tamta
"Koda Sou"	2012	—	—	Non-album single
"Pare Me"	2013	8	—	Best of Tamta
"Gennithika Gia Sena" (featuring Xenia Ghali)	2014	5	—	Best of Tamta
"Always Broken" (featuring Xenia Ghali)	2014	—	—	Best of Tamta
"Gennithika Gia Sena (Unplugged)" (featuring Xenia Ghali)	2014	—	—	Non-album singles
"Den Ime O,ti Nomizis"	2015	—	—	Non-album singles
"Unloved"	2015	27	—	Best of Tamta
"To Kati Parapano"	2016	—	—	Best of Tamta
"Protimo"	2017	—	—	Best of Tamta
"Ilious Ke Thalasses"	2017	5	—	Best of Tamta
"More Than A Summer Love"	2017	—	—	Best of Tamta
"Pes mou an tolmas"	2018	—	—	Non-album singles
"Arhes Kalokairiou"	2018	6	—	Non-album singles
"Tag You In My Sky"	2018	—	—	Non-album singles
"Na Me Pareis Makria"	2018	12	—	Non-album singles
"Replay"	2019	2	72	Non-album singles
"Senorita" (with SNIK)	2019	1	—	Non-album singles
"Sex With Your Ex"	2019	15	—	Awake
"S' Agapo"	2020	4	—	Non-album single
"Yala" (with Stephane Legar)	2020	—	—	Awake
"Den Eisai Edo" (with Mente Fuerte)	2020	5	—	Non-album singles
"N.E.R.O" (with IAMSTRONG)	2021	—	—	Non-album singles
"Ekdromi (2022)" (with Michalis Hatzigiannis)	2022	2	—	Non-album singles
"Pandora"	2022	—	—	Non-album singles
"Freestyler" (with Kareem Kalokoh)	2022	—	—	Non-album singles
"Identity Crisis"	2023	—	—	Identity Crisis
"FLX"	2024	—	—	Non-album singles
"FLX (Remix)" (with MITCH T)	2024	—	—	Non-album singles
"Gazi"	2024	—	—	Non-album singles
"Chrome Hearts" (with Saske)	2025	—	—	THE VILLAIN HEROINE
"Fever Ride" (with VASSIŁINA)	2025	—	—	Non-album singles
"OOH AHH"	2025	—	—	Non-album singles
"SOMA DANEIKO"	2025	—	—	Non-album singles
"TOP" (featuring BARBZ)	2026	—	—	Non-album singles
"AUTOTAPINOSI"	2026	—	—	Non-album singles
"IN BERLIN" (with Ellize)	2026	—	—	Non-album singles
"—" denotes a recording that did not chart or was not released.

=== As featured artist ===
Title	Year	Album
"Tornero/Tromero (MAD Version)" (Mihai Traistariu featuring Tamta)	2006	Tamta
"S' Opoion Aresei (...Dan Sonra)" (Stereo Mike featuring Tamta)	2008	Tharros I Alitheia
"Tonight" (Playmen & Claydee Lupa featuring Tamta)	2011	Best of Tamta
"S' Agapao" (Midenistis featuring Tamta)	2013	Best of Tamta
"FACE" (Die Arkitekt featuring Tamta)	2021	Dark Colors
"sprite" (TEO.x3 featuring Tamta)	2025	iDidntMeanToGhostYouButMyWifiCrashedAgain

== Music videos ==
Title	Year
"T' Allo Mou Miso" (featuring Stavros Konstantinou)	2004
"Ftais (Faraway)"	2006
"Den Teleionei Etsi I Agapi"	2006
"Einai Krima" (featuring Grigoris Petrakos)	2006
"Agapise Me"	2007
"Agapo (Wanna Play)"	2007
"Mia Stigmi Esy Kai Ego"	2007
"Ela Sto Rythmo"	2008
"Koita Me"	2009
"Tharros I Alithia" (featuring Sakis Rouvas)	2010
"Fotia"	2010
"Tonight" (featuring Playmen)	2011
"Niose Tin Kardia"	2012
"Konta Sou"	2012
"Pare Me"	2013
"S' Agapao" (featuring Midenistis)	2013
"Gennithika Gia Sena" (featuring Xenia Ghali)	2014
"Den Ime O,ti Nomizis"	2015
"Unloved"	2015
"Ilious Kai Thalasses"	2017
"Pes Mou An Tolmas"	2018
"Arhes Kalokairiou"	2018
"Na Me Pareis Makria"	2018
"Replay"	2019
"Senorita" (with Snik)	2019
"Sex With Your Ex"	2019
"S' Agapo"	2020
"Yala" (with Stephane Legar)	2020
"Den Eisai Edo" (with Mente Fuerte)	2020
"N.E.R.O" (with IAMSTRONG)	2021
"FACE" (with Die Arkitekt)	2021
"Pandora"	2022
"Identity Crisis"	2023
"Azucar (Anexigito)"	2023
"Autaparti (High In The Afterparty)"	2023
"Allo Ti Leo"	2024
"GAZI"	2024
"ANAKATA"	2024
"KHORUMI"	2025
"CHROME HEARTS" (with Saske)	2025
"MONOTONIA" (with LILA)	2025
"TOKYO ATHINA"	2025
"HELLO KITTY"	2025
"AUTOTAPINOSI"	2026
