= Rock + Live =

Live album by Christos Dantis
- Released: 2007
- Recorded: 2007
- Genre: Rock, pop-rock, funk rock, soul
- Language: English, Greek
- Label: Sony BMG, Columbia
- Producer: Christos Dantis

Christos Dantis chronology
Min Peis Pote (2006)	Rock + Live (2007)	Ektos Trohias (2008)

Singles from Rock + Live
- 1. "To Teleftaio Potiraki (feat. Peggy Zina)" Released: 2007; 2. "Gia To Kalo Mou" Released: 2007

Rock + Live is the second live album by Christos Dantis and first from a solo concert, recorded from his MAD Secret Concert and released in 2007 in Greece and Cyprus by Sony BMG Greece. The album is composed mostly of covers of other artists, most of which is English-language material. The album also features guest appearances by Kostas Tournas, who Dantis previously collaborated on an album with, Peggy Zina, Tamta, and Kostas Martakis. The entire album possesses a rock theme. The concert was broadcast on ANT1 and its main supporters were Flocafé and Samsung Hellas.

== Track listing ==
Disc 1

1. "Somebody Told Me" (The Killers)
2. "Ruby" (Kaiser Chiefs)
3. "Instabile" (Nek)
4. "Un Film di Fantasia" (Tainia Fantasias) (Fili Gia Panda)
5. "Vithos" (Depth)
6. "Fly Away" (Lenny Kravitz)
7. "Dani California" (Red Hot Chili Peppers)
8. "Kommatia" (Pieces)
9. "Desire" (U2)
10. "No Madonna"
11. "Min tis to Peis" (Don't tell her) (with Kostas Tournas)
12. "Gia To Kalo Mou" (For my own good) (Giannis Miliokas)

Disc 2

1. "To Teleftaio Potiraki" (with Peggy Zina) (The last shot)
2. "Heaven" (Bryan Adams)
3. "Psycho Killer" (Talking Heads)
4. "One Way or Another" (Blondie
5. "Summertime Blues" (with Kostas Martakis) (Eddie Cochran)
6. "It's a Man's Man's Man's World" (James Brown)
7. "Superstition" (Stevie Wonder)
8. "Black Betty" (Iron Head)
9. "Hoochie Coochie Man" (Muddy Waters)
10. "Are You Gonna Go My Way" (with Tamta) (Lenny Kravitz)
11. "Boulevard of Broken Dreams" (Green Day)
12. "Alcoholic" (Starsailor)
13. "Bleeding" (Matono) (Peggy Zina)

== Single ==
To Teleftaio Potiraki

Dantis' collaboration with Zina was the first single from the album. The music video was created using footage from the live performance.

Gia To Kalo Mou

Dantis' cover of Giannis Miliokas' "Gia To Kalo Mou" was the second single from the album. A music video of the live performance was released.

== Promotion ==
Dantis performed James Brown's "It's a Man's Man's Man's World" onstage at the sixth Arion Music Awards on October 29, 2007.
