= Tharros I Alitheia =

Tharros I Alitheia may refer to:

== Music ==
- Tharros I Alitheia (Tamta album), an album by Greek singer Tamta
  - Tharros I Alitheia (song), the title track of the album
