= Super Idol =

Super Idol may refer to:

- Super Idol (Taiwanese TV series), Taiwanese music competition to find new singing talent
- "Super Idol 2004", 2004 single/EP by Stavros Konstantinou
