= Places (Xenia Ghali song) =

Single by Xenia Ghali
- Released: December 29, 2016
- Recorded: 2016
- Length: 3:07
- Label: Funky Sheep Records; Radial by the Chalkboard
- Songwriter(s): Xenia Ghali; Raquel Castro
- Producer(s): Xenia Ghali

Xenia Ghali singles chronology
"Under These Lights" (2016)	"Places" (2016)

"Places" is a song recorded, written, and produced by Greek DJ Xenia Ghali, featuring vocals by singer-songwriter Raquel Castro. The track became Ghali's second single to reach number one on the Billboard Dance Club Songs chart in its May 6, 2017 issue.

== Track listing ==
Single

1. "Places" (featuring Raquel Castro) [radio edit] – 3:07

Remix

1. "Places" (extended mix) – 4:31

Remixes Part 2

1. "Places" (X.G. Remix)
2. "Places" (Belocca's Space Remix)
3. "Places" (Gamechasers Remix)
4. "Places" (Chunks Remix)
5. "Places" (Casey Alva Remix)

== Charts ==
Chart (2017)	Peak position
US Dance Club Songs (Billboard)	1
