= Tharros I Alitheia (song) =

Single by Tamta featuring Sakis Rouvas

from the album Tharros I Alitheia
- Released: 9 December 2009
- Recorded: November 2009
- Genre: Electropop, house, ambient, dance-pop
- Length: 4:42
- Label: EMI/Minos
- Songwriters: Dimitris Kontopoulos, Viki Gerothodorou
- Producer: Dimitris Kontopoulos

Tamta singles chronology
"Kita Me" (2009)	"Tharros I Alitheia" (2009)	"Egoista" (2010)

Sakis Rouvas singles chronology
"Spase To Hrono" (2009)	"Tharros I Alithea" (2009)	"Emena Thes" (2010)

"Tharros I Alitheia" (Greek: "Θάρρος Ή Αλήθεια"; English: Courage or truth, or more loosely translated as truth or dare) is a song by Greek pop singer Tamta, featuring fellow Greek pop/rock singer Sakis Rouvas. The dance song was written by Dimitris Kontopoulos with lyrics by Viki Gerothodorou for her third studio album of the same name and was released on 9 December 2009 to radio stations in Greece and Cyprus by Minos EMI. This was Tamta and Rouvas' second collaboration after a duet recorded for the latter's 2006 album was never released. The song also served as promotion for the two artists' winter 2009–2010 concert series at The S Club.

The song reached high in airplay and became a major club hit. The well-received and sexualized music video earned nominations for Female Artist of the Year and Best Duet or Collaboration Video at the MAD Video Music Awards 2010.

== Background and recording ==
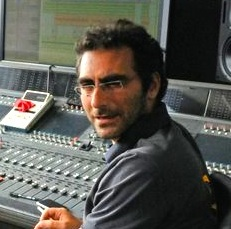
The electronic song was composed by Dimitris Kontopoulos.

"Tharros I Alitheia" contains music written by Dimitris Kontopoulos, who she had first collaborated with for her second album, while the lyrics were written by Viki Gerothodorou, who had previously collaborated with Tamta for her self-titled debut album. Kontopoulos and Gerothodorou had both previously collaborated with the featured artist, Sakis Rouvas as of To Hrono Stamatao (2003) and Iparhi Agapi Edo (2006), respectively, and in collaboration have created his hits "Ola Gyro Sou Gyrizoun", "Stous 31 Dromous", "+ Se Thelo", and "Pio Dinata". Tamta first got in touch with Rouvas during the recording of his 11th studio album, Iparhi Agapi Edo in late 2006. She performed as the opening act at his Sakis on the Waves beach concert and the two eventually recorded a duet together, also written by Dimitris Kontopoulos, with MAD TV adding that the song's theme would provoke reaction. It was widely reported that the duet would appear on his new studio album, however a little before the release of Iparhi Agapi Edo, MAD TV reported that the track had been cut from the album with no explanation why. While at first it was unknown whether this new duet was indeed that song, it became apparent that it was not as in the aforementioned track Rouvas was the lead artist, as well as that this new track was recorded in 2009. Since 2006, the two artists did not find any further opportunity to collaborate until 2009, when Rouvas chose Tamta as his main supporting act for his winter 2009–2010 season concert series, eventually revealed to be at the newly renovated The S Club, where Rouvas is the owner. Thus, "Tharros I Alitheia" was also recorded in promotion of their shows. Tamta expressed how much she really wanted to collaborate with Rouvas: "It was something that I wanted very much. Of course, many times not everything works out according to your own desires. Fortunately though this collaboration was materialized." Tamta revealed that "Tharros I Alitheia" was a song that she liked very much.

I believe that it is one of my strong collaborations. It already has me worried about the future. This is my best moment now, as far as the match I have musically with Sakis. Without wanting to put down all the people I have collaborated with —I adore them— like, ex, Giorgos Mazonakis. The people who go to see Sakis musically are very close to me, in relation to those who go to see a laïko artist.

The track was recorded sometime in late November at Kontopoulos' studio, coinciding with the artists' busy rehearsal schedule for The S Club. Before its release, Tamta had not heard the final result as Kontopoulos and Rouvas were in the studio up until the song's release working on the finishing touches.

== Composition and theme ==
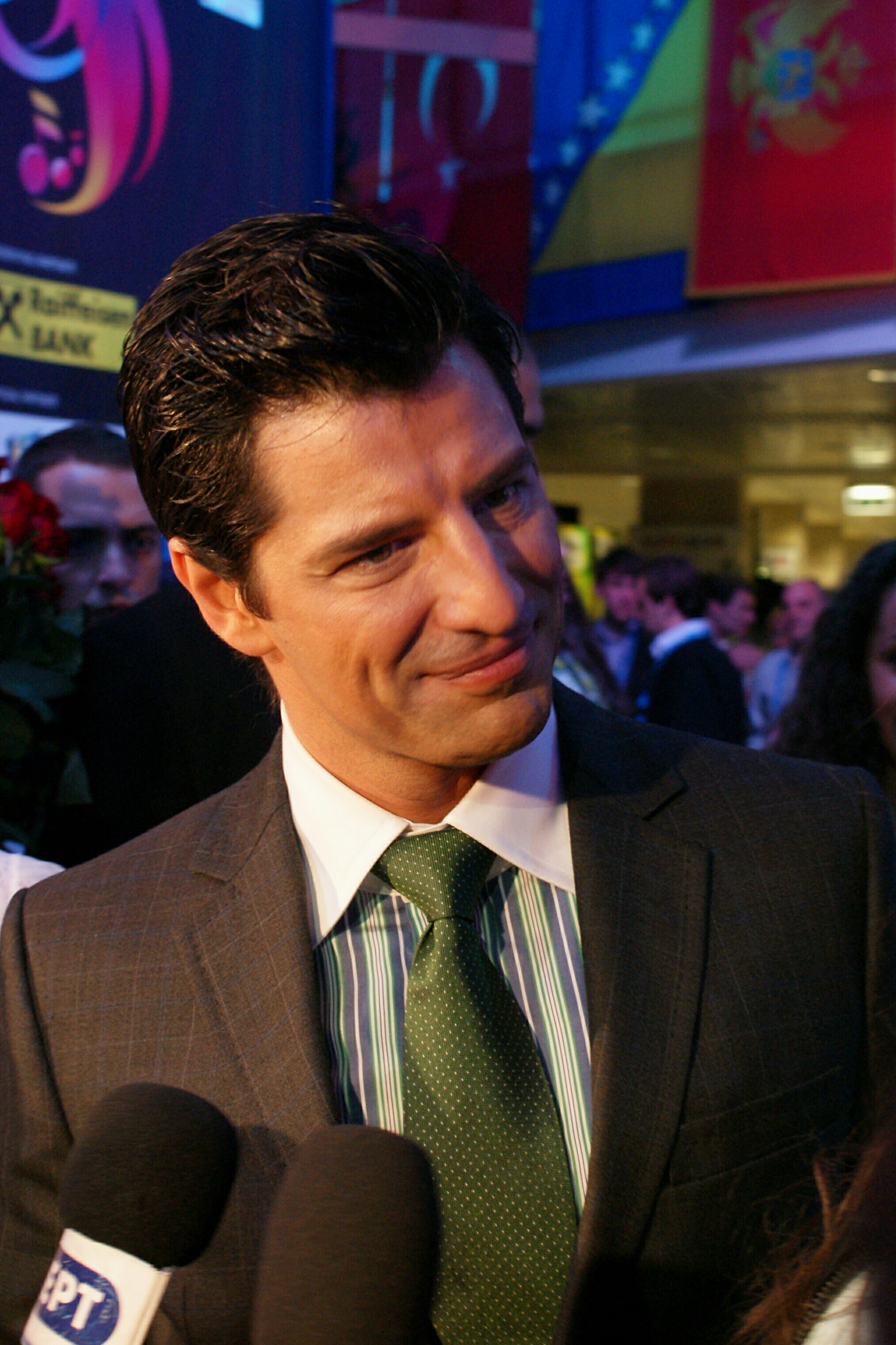
Rouvas served as the featured artist on "Tharros I Alitheia", providing a spoken verse.

"Tharros I Alitheia" is a dance song with heavy influences from varying electronic genres, including house and ambient. The song begins with Tamta faintly singing the chorus, proceeding into the traditional verse-chorus format, with Rouvas performing the verse. Tamta and Rouvas' vocal parts never overlap during the song; Rouvas is limited to the verses and Tamta to the chorus. Rouvas does not actually sing in the song, instead performing a spoken rap. The song's music and lyrics possess a sensual theme. Lyrically the verses have Rouvas telling Tamta different things that he wants from her, ending with a challenge: "Choose/Truth or dare". In the chorus Tamta responds by professing her love to him. In relation to the song's theme, Tamta said that she always prefers truth, mostly because she is very afraid of lies.

== Release ==
The song premiered on Greek and Cypriot radio stations on 9 December 2009, making it the third single from her third studio album following "S'Opion Aresei" (Dansonra) with Stereo Mike and "Kita Me". The artists involved tried to keep the song a surprise up until its release, although Kontopoulos had posted a video of the artists in the studio, sparking rumors of a collaboration. It was further released as a digital single on 11 January to online retailers such as the iTunes Store. This is the sixth duet single by Tamta, either as a lead or featured artist and fifth collaboration overall by Rouvas.

== Chart performance ==
"Tharros I Alitheia" became a hit on Greek airplay charts before the music video was even released. During this time, Rouvas' solo single "Spase To Hrono" was occupying the top positions of the charts. More directed towards the club market, it became a major hit there. It is Tamta's third consecutive hit from the album and is also Rouvas' fifth consecutive top ten hit following the number-one hits "+ Se Thelo", "Irthes", "This Is Our Night", and "Spase To Hrono".

== Music video ==
=== Concept and development ===
The music video was shot on 28 January 2010 by Kostas Kapetanidis, who Tamta had first collaborated with in 2005 for her debut video for "Ftais", and has since directed her videos "Den Teleionei Etsi I Agapi", "Agapise Me", and "Agapo", while he has also collaborated with Rouvas on multiple occasions since 1995, including on "Ela Mou", "Mia Fora", "Shake It", both versions of "S'eho Erotefthi", "1000 Milia", "Horis Kardia", and "Irthes". The video was shot at Studio Rapti in Melissia from noon and did not conclude until the next morning. MAD TV crews were on set during shooting and did a photo report that same day. The concept of the video plays on a yin yang-type theme, with the light and darkness, innocence and eroticism continuously altering, thus contrasting with the song's title. Tamta's multiple wardrobe changes, varying between "classy and trendy" were meant as a means of further highlight these contradictions. MAD TV claimed that the shooting of the video was "demanding". Tamta spoke about the emotions of the video and her image, saying:

I feel absolutely sexy and for that are not responsible only the clothes. I feel sexy even without needing to wear something provocative. However, I am sure, as my collaborators are that this video clip will be the sexiest thing that I have done up until now.

=== Synopsis ===
Based on the concept, for the majority Rouvas represents the dark and erotic side of the video, while Tamta the light and innocence. The video begins with the image of a man in shadows spinning on a chair and holding his head with his hand. It then forwards to a scene with Tamta, wearing leopard print lingerie, looking in a mirror and getting dressed, continuously alternating between these two scenes, while lights flash constantly. As the first verse begins, the shadowy figure is revealed to be Rouvas, with sweat dripping heavily down his face and an unidentified female hand touching him. A new scene is added with Tamta standing in front of a white background with the wind blowing, wearing various loose, flowy costumes, one of which is a Laskaris Haute Couture creation. The scenes constantly alternate between a single frame to a grid. Throughout the video Tamta wears five different costumes. It was also the first music video where Tamta can be seen with her new look.

=== Release and reception ===
The video was released over one month after its filming date on 8 March 2010 through MAD TV. MAD TV praised the video as a "sensual extreme" and also commented that Tamta was "more glowing and sylish than ever." The network concluded that "Impressive costumes, beautiful direction and two talented artists giving their best selves are the components of a successful music video." The video earned Tamta and Rouvas a MAD Video Music Awards 2010 nomination for Best Duet or Collaboration Video, while also earning Tamta a further award for Female Artist of the Year, based on overall contributions to the music video artform throughout the year.

== Live performances ==
Tamta premiered the song at The S Club concert series where she served as a supporting act for Rouvas, using the track as her opening number. Rouvas did not perform the song live with Tamta, as he did not appear on stage until after midnight. Instead, his vocal part was played through a recording, as Tamta lay in the centre of the stage with the lights dimmed, with minimal blue lighting in the backdrop. A smoke machine is also used. As Tamta's part begins a video in the background is played featuring geometric shapes rapidly changing colours. Tamta, wearing a purple leotard, proceeds to stand during the second chorus and four female backing dancers appear and perform a choreography. The show moved to Thessaloniki on 14 May at Politia: Live Clubbin, where a similar routine was performed. Tamta also performed the song as well as others from her album at a guest appearance at Stavro Tou Notou with Isaïas Matiamba.

== Track listing ==
1. "Tharros I Alitheia"

== Personnel ==
- Tamta – vocals
- Sakis Rouvas – vocals
- Dimitris Kontopoulos – arranger, producer, programmer, songwriter, synths
- Viki Gerothodorou – songwriter

== Release history ==
Region	Date	Label	Format
Greece	9 December 2009	Minos EMI	Radio single, promo single
Greece	11 January 2010	Minos EMI	Digital download
Cyprus	9 December 2009	Minos EMI	Radio single
