= Awake (Tamta EP) =

EP by Tamta
- Released: 3 July 2020
- Recorded: 2019
- Genre: Pop
- Length: 19:17
- Language: English
- Label: Minos EMI
- Producer: Roulsen; BoombaMontana; Ben Cassorla; Luminescence; Teo Pouzbouris

Tamta chronology
Best Of (2017)	Awake (2020)	Identity Crisis (2023)

Singles from Awake
- 1. "Sex with Your Ex" Released: 15 November 2019; 2. "My Zone" Released: 7 April 2020; 3. "Yala" Released: 28 July 2020; 4. "Hold On" Released: 27 October 2020; 5. "Awake" Released: 13 January 2021

Awake is the first extended play by Georgian-Greek singer Tamta. It was released for digital download on 3 July 2020, by Minos EMI.

== Singles ==
The album's lead single, "Sex with Your Ex", was written by Roel Rats, Marcia Sondeijker, Ben Cassorla, Alexandra Veltri, and produced by Ben Cassorla, Roulsen, and was released on 15 November 2019. The album's second single, "My Zone", was written and produced by Boombamontana, and was released on 7 April 2020. The album's third single, "Yala", was written by Stéphane Legar, Doli & Penn, Roel Rats, Marcia Sondeijker, Lonneke Eline Zijlstra, Tim Langley and produced by Roulsen, and was released on 28 July 2020. The album's fourth single, "Hold On", was written by Barrice, Sin Laurent, Daphne Lawrence and produced by BoombaMontana, and was released on 27 October 2020. The album's fifth single, "Awake", was written by Roel Rats, Marcia Sondeijker, Andrew Holyfield, Eric Lumiere, Ryuichi Flores and produced by Roulsen, and was released on 13 January 2021.

== Track listing ==
No.	Title	Writer(s)	Producer(s)	Length
1.	"Awake"	Roel Rats; Marcia Sondeijker; Eric Lumiere; Andrew Holyfield; Ryuichi Flores	Roulsen	2:39
2.	"Hold On"	Barrice; Sin Laurent; Daphne Lawrence	BoombaMontana	3:02
3.	"Yala" (feat Stéphane Legar)	Legar; Doli & Penn; Rats; Sondeijker; Lonneke Eline Zijlstra; Tim Langley	Roulsen	2:38
4.	"Sex with Your Ex"	Rats; Sondeijker; Ben Cassorla; Alexandra Veltri	Roulsen; Cassorla	2:10
5.	"On the Run"	Luminescence; Saske; Lawrence	Luminescence	2:54
6.	"My Zone"	BoombaMontana	BoombaMontana	2:47
7.	"Silence"	Bill Leeb; Rhys Fulber; Sarah McLachlan	Teo Pouzbouris	3:07
Total length:				19:17

== Personnel ==
- Roulsen – mixing (track 1), mastering (track 4)
- Ben Cassorla – mastering (track 4)
- Kyriakos Asteriou – mastering (track 7)
- Beyond – mixing, mastering (track 2, 6)
- Luminescence – mixing, mastering (track 5)
- Teo Pouzbouris – mixing (track 7)
- Davide Ruffini – mastering (track 1)
