= Gennithika Gia Sena/Always Broken =

"Gennithika Gia Sena/Always Broken (feat. Xenia Ghali)"

Single by Tamta featuring Xenia Ghali
- Released: January 1, 2014 (Tamta Versions); August 5, 2014 (Xenia Ghali Version Radio Edit); October 8, 2014 (Xenia Ghali Version Extended [Italy])
- Recorded: Greece (Tamta Versions); New York (Xenia Ghali Version)
- Genre: Pop; EDM; Greek pop
- Length: 3:40 (Greek & English version); 3:40 (Greek Music Video); 3:43 (Unplugged Greek Version); 3:53 (Xenia Ghali Version Radio Edit); 4:50 (Xenia Ghali Version Extended)
- Label: Minos EMI (Tamta Versions); Funky Sheep Records (Xenia Ghali Version); Mr. 305 (Xenia Ghali Version); DANCEANDLOVE SRL (Xenia Ghali Italian Version)
- Songwriters: Stan (Greek Version) Katrina Russ (English Version)
- Producer: Xenia Ghali (All Versions)

Tamta singles chronology
"S' Agapao" (2013)	"Gennithika Gia Sena/Always Broken (feat. Xenia Ghali)" (2014)	"Den Ime O,ti Nomizis" (2015)

English Version
- Always Broken (feat. Xenia Ghali)

Unplugged Version
- Gennithika Gia Sena (Unplugged Version) [feat. Xenia Ghali]

Xenia Ghali Version
- Broken (feat. Katt Rockell)

"Gennithika Gia Sena" ("Γεννήθηκα Για Σένα" or translated in English "I Was Born For You") and "Always Broken" is a song by Georgian-Greek pop singer Tamta featuring Greek-American DJ and producer Xenia Ghali and is the 23rd single in her entire singles discography. The Greek version was written by Stan and the English version which is her 6th English song and her 24th single in her singles discography, which was written by Katrina Russ. The song was digitally released via the iTunes Store by the Greek division of UMG Minos EMI on January 1, 2014. This song has four different versions which are a Greek Version, English Version, Unplugged Greek Version by Tamta and an EDM Version by Xenia Ghali (feat. Katt Rockell). Which by the way all four were composed and produced by Xenia Ghali.

"Gennithika Gia Sena" was the first single to be released in Greece which was a success. After its release "Always Broken" was then released as the English Version of 'Gennithika Gia Sena'. Then an Unplugged version which is the 25th single (more like an Acoustic) was released with less pop and electric instruments and more with Acoustic vocals and piano.

== Tamta version ==
All three versions of "Gennithika Gia Sena", "Always Broken", and the Unplugged version were released throughout Europe. The songs were never released in North America, Asia, Africa and only limited to Australia. A music video in Greek (Gennithika Gia Sena) was also released on June 25, 2014 on Tamta's Official VEVO account, it was directed by Yiannis Papadakos, the video is only available in Europe with the restrictions on countries/regions such as North America, Africa, and Asia.

Due to country restriction the songs (Greek, English & Unplugged) are not for sale in some parts of North America, Asia, and Africa. The songs are available on SoundCloud and or YouTube.

- Gennithika Gia Sena (feat. Xenia Ghali)
- Gennithika Gia Sena (Unplugged) [feat. Xenia Ghali]
- Always Broken (MADWalk 2014)
- Always Broken (Freaky Fortune Remix)

== Xenia Ghali version ==
The Xenia Ghali version is accompanied by EDM sounds by the DJ/Producer herself and with R&B vocals by Katt Rockell. The track is titled "Broken" instead of 'Always Broken' but has the same lyrics as the English version of Tamta. Xenia Ghali stated in an interview with 'PopWrapped' saying, ""Broken" was actually not recorded in Greek originally. The song was originally recorded in English with Katt Rockell (as released on Pitbull's label). Prior to having released the song with Katt Rockell in English, a Greek pop star (Tamta) heard it and was interested in recording it in Greek as well. The version in Greek is actually a little different too, with a more 'European' flare to it. The reason why it was released in Greek first was only due to the fact that it took longer to schedule the release date in the States."

Xenia Ghali's version is available throughout Europe and in the States and parts of North America. There has been two different versions of "Broken", a released Radio Edit which released internationally, and an Extended Version which only released in Italy.

== Track listing ==
Gennithika Gia Sena – Greek Version
No.	Title	Writer(s)	Producer(s)	Length
1.	"Gennithika Gia Sena (feat. Xenia Ghali)"	Stan	Xenia Ghali	3:40
Total length:				3:40

Always Broken – English Version
No.	Title	Writer(s)	Producer(s)	Length
1.	"Always Broken (feat. Xenia Ghali)"	Katrina Russ	Xenia Ghali	3:40
Total length:				3:40

Gennithika Gia Sen – Unplugged Version
No.	Title	Writer(s)	Producer(s)	Length
1.	"Gennithika Gia Sen (Unplugged Version) [feat. Xenia Ghali]"	Stan	Xenia Ghali	3:43
Total length:				3:43

Broken – Xenia Ghali Version (International)
No.	Title	Writer(s)	Producer(s)	Length
1.	"Broken (feat. Katt Rockell) [Radio Edit]"	Katrina Russ	Xenia Ghali	3:53
Total length:				3:53

Broken – Xenia Ghali Version (iTunes Italy)
No.	Title	Writer(s)	Length
1.	"Broken (feat. Katt Rockell) [Radio Edit]"	Katrina Russ	3:53
2.	"Broken (feat. Katt Rockell) [Extended Version]"	Katrina Russ	4:50
Total length:			8:43

== Charts ==
Chart (2014)	Peak position
Greece (IFPI)	5
