= No Madonna =

Single by Christos Dantis
- B-side: "Bleeding"
- Released: (Greece) June, 2007
- Recorded: 2007
- Genre: Rock, Pop
- Length: 2:59
- Label: Sony BMG Greece
- Songwriter(s): Christos Dantis, Natalia Germanou
- Producer(s): Christos Dantis

Christos Dantis singles chronology
| "Gia Senane Boro" (2006) | "No Madonna" (2007) |

"No Madonna" is a song by Greek singer Christos Dantis. The song was Dantis's entry in a three way race to be Greece's entry in the Eurovision Song Contest 2007. He battled both Tamta and Sarbel for the spot, and on February 28, 2007, Greece chose Sarbel's "Yassou Maria". The song came in second place.

The song was composed by Dantis himself and lyrics were by Natalia Germanou. Together in 2005, they also composed the winning Eurovision song My Number One for Elena Paparizou. The song is an upbeat rock influenced song with an ethnic Greek twist. Christos Dantis was accompanied by 5 female dancers with blond wigs made to resemble American singer Madonna. The stage show included a fog machine and the song's lyrics written on the video wall talking to the audience. He wore a black suite on stage, then later a shiny black jacket.

The song was later release as a CD-Single along with an English rock version of Peggy Zina's "Matono" called "Bleeding". The CD-Single also included an official remix of "No Madonna".

== Track listing ==
1. "No Madonna" - 2:59
2. "Bleeding" - 4:09
3. "No Madonna" (Official Remix) [By Master Tempo] - 3:41

== Charts ==
=== Weekly charts ===
| Chart (2007) | Peak position |
|---|---|
| Greece (IFPI Greece) | 3 |

=== Year-end charts ===
| Chart (2007) | Peak position |
|---|---|
| Greece (IFPI Greece) | 25 |

== See also ==
- Greece in the Eurovision Song Contest 2007
