= With Love (Tamta song) =

Single by Tamta

from the album Agapise Me
- Released: March 2007 (Greece)
- Genre: Pop
- Length: 3:05
- Label: EMI Greece
- Songwriters: Nikos Terzis; Posidonas Giannopoulos

Tamta singles chronology
"Einai Krima" (2006)	"With Love" (2007)	"Agapise Me" (2007)

"With Love" is a song by the Georgian-Greek singer Tamta. The song was Tamta's entry in a three-way race with Christos Dantis and Sarbel to be Greece's entry in the Eurovision Song Contest 2007. On February 28, 2007, Greece chose Sarbel's "Yassou Maria".

== National final ==
Tamta chose to sing the "With Love", a ballad composed by the Eurovision veteran Nikos Terzis. Lyrics were by Posidonas Giannopoulos. The ballad was of ethnic style containing Greek elements as well as others. A part of the song was in Greek. Tamta went on stage with two male dancers and had a stage act with pyrotechnics. She wore a white dress with while glove and a white hood. The background was orange-yellow. The male dancers used red ribbon-flags on stage. The video wall in the background showed the words "love" and "happiness" in different languages. The performance suffered a microphone glitch mid-way when one of the dancers stepped on a wire.

== Track listing ==
- CD promo
1. "With Love" (Demo Version)
- CD single
1. "With Love" – 3:00
2. "With Love" (Soul Spirit Mix) – 4:01

== Charts ==
Chart	Providers	Peak position	Weeks On Charts	Certification
Greek Singles Chart	IFPI	2	21	-

== See also ==
- Greece in the Eurovision Song Contest 2007
