= Christos Dantis =

Greek musician

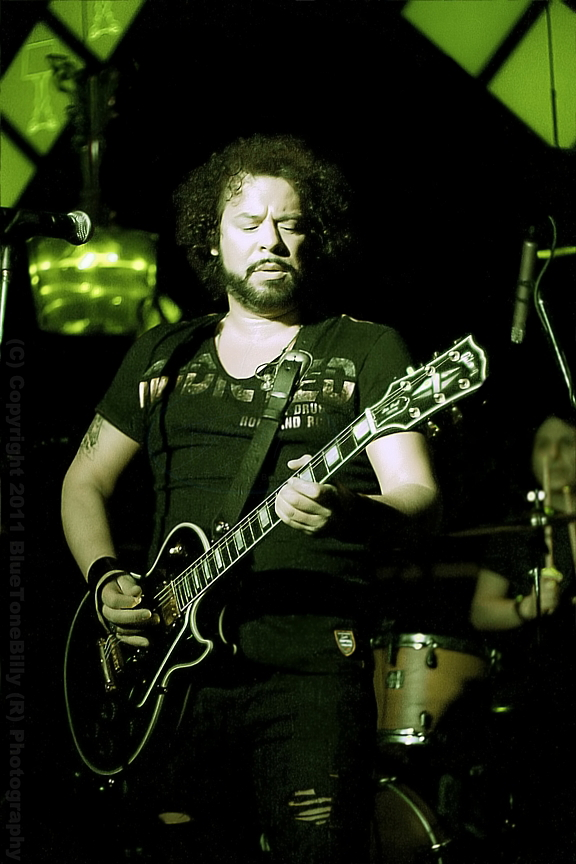
- Christos Dantis performing at a concert 2011

Background information
- Born: Christos Vlachakis; 26 September 1966 (age 60); Athens, Greece
- Origin: Kaisariani, Greece
- Genres: Contemporary laikó, rock
- Occupations: Musician; songwriter; producer
- Years active: 1986–present
- Labels: Ria Records; Sakkaris Records; BMG Greece; Nitro Music; Sony Music Greece
- Website: christosdantis.com

Christos Dantis (Greek: Χρήστος Δάντης; born Christos Vlachakis (Χρήστος Βλαχάκης); 26 September 1966), is a Greek multi-instrumentalist, singer, songwriter, lyricist, and record producer best known for his hits such as "To Palio Mou Palto" and "Ena Tragoudi Akoma" and later for co-writing the song "My Number One" for Elena Paparizou, winning the Eurovision Song Contest 2005 for Greece.

== Career ==
=== Early music career ===
Christos Dantis started playing music in front of an audience when in his early teens. He sang and played either guitar or bass guitar, while also experimenting with the drums, in various music genre bands such as rock, funk, soul, R&B, metal etc. It was in the 1986–87 period of the Music Stage Taboo in Athens, when during the auditions for new singers to complement the program of main singers Tania Tsanaklidou and Dimitra Galani, composer George Hatzinasios was the "godfather" of his name Dantis. During that period Christos sang on commercial advertising jingles while meeting with many influential producers like Akis Golfidis owner of R.I.A. Productions-Records back then, who produced most of his very first recordings in vinyl.

The first professionally produced song he sang was in 1986 titled "Tell me more" (T. Kallianiotis/T.Siganos) in a compilation named "Straight to the top" consisting of various Greek artists singing English lyrics songs. The compilation was made by R.I.A. Productions and distributed by Sony in 1991. In 1987, he sang in his first 45 rpm maxi single, again with R.I.A. Productions named "Christian Dante – Turn On" (C.Dantis/G.Shaggs) from Sakkaris Records (SR 8546). One year later he collaborated with the composer Yannis Karalis and made his first television appearance on the TV show of Lilanda Likiardopoulou "Prova" on Karalis song named "Eida tin morfi sou". Same year and his second LP single is out named "Belly Dance (Y.Karalis/T.Siganos). Performances start to multiply for Christos singing covers of domestic contemporary pop/folk hits and foreign covers of songs sung by James Brown and Terence Trent d'arby.

=== 1990–2000: Growing popularity ===
Dantis later released his first personal album called Dahtilika Apotypomata in 1990 with music and lyrics written by Giannis Karalis which became platinum.

In 1991, he released the golden album Aman which was also released in four European countries with remixes. At the same time the video clips from the album were played on MTV and MCM accompanied by a TV special offering live performances and an interview with Steve Blame the presenter of MTV.

The first experimentations Christos Dantis did with folk songs was in 1993 with the album Ala. One year later Dantis released his most familiar pop-rock album to date, titled 4. The album became gold and the song "Kapoios S’ Agapaei" appeared on MTV once more. Dantis released another album a year later in 1995 called Tama. The album became gold and following his gold success, Dantis decided to release another album in 1996 called Foni Voodos and another in 1997 titled Ta Giousoufakia.

Not wanting to disappoint his growing fan base, Dantis released a double album titled Tournas – Dantis Live or known by some as Krifo Sholeio. The live recordings were taken from his concerts that year with rock artist Kostas Tournas. Striving for the best, Dantis began work on his next album immediately. It took just 11 months of preparations in studio for his next album To Palio Mou Palto which was released in 1999. The album immediately became gold.

=== 2000–2004: Further success ===
A few months later, he redid the song "24.000 baci" by Adriano Celentano for the movie Safe Sex created by Repas and Papathanasiou which is included in the movie soundtrack. The song reached the top of the charts after just a couple of days of release. In 2001 he moved to the independent Greek record label Nitro Music and released the album To Domatio which soon became platinum and the songs "To Domatio", "Dos Mou Fotia" and his duet with Notis Sfakianakis "Himonas Einai" became hits.

After a two-year break, Dantis returned in May 2003 by signing with Sony Music Greece and with the album Ena Tragoudi Akoma composed entirely by Giorgos Theofanous. In 2004 he participated in the Greek talent show Fame Story as a member of the committee and in May, he released one of his most successful albums to date Maya Maya. Besides himself, music and lyrics were written by Vangelis Konstantinidis, Vassilis Giannopoulos, Sofie Pappa, Natalia Germanou, Manos Psaltakis, Christoforos Germenis, Konstantinos Pantzis, Giannis Liondos, and Antonis Skokos. In the winter of 2004–05 he appeared at club Fix with Christos Pazis.

In 2005, he co-wrote with Natalia Germanou the lyrics for the song "My Number One", composed by Manos Psaltakis. It was chosen as Greece's official participation in the Eurovision Song Contest in Kyiv, Ukraine and sung by Elena Paparizou on 21 May 2005. The song won the contest and Greece won the contest for the first time. The song became very popular with Elena Paparizou and Dantis reaching highs in their careers.

=== 2005–present ===
In May 2005, Christos Dantis wrote the album Eho Sta Matia Ourano for Katy Garbi along with the songs "Akouse Agori Mou", "To Narkotiko Mou", and his duet "Spaciba Baby". In June of the same year he signed the music of Flora Theodorou's first single titled "Giatre Mou!!!". The CD single includes 3 songs, music by Christos Dantis and lyrics by Vassilis Giannopoulos and Natalia Germanou. He cooperated with NOVA's satellite platform and wrote the song "Ola Super" with lyrics by Vangelis Konstantinidis which will be the musical pattern for 9 sports channels.

In September 2005, he went to Thessaloniki with Katy Garbi for a number of appearances. Following that, he released a CD single titled "Prodosia" in October 2005. The songs "Beautiful", "Ola another CD Single titled "Gia Senane Bora". It was accompanied by a full-length album in the fall of 2006 called "Min Peis Pote". In January 2007, ERT asked Dantis to take part in a National Selection as a singer to represent Greece in the Eurovision Song Contest 2007. His song "No Madonna" hit the charts but didn't make it to the competition.

In September 2007, after his collaboration with the Mad Music Channel under the "Mad Secret Concert" events, he released the album "DANTIS – ROCK AND LIVE" with many popular cover songs of artists such as The Killers, Kaiser Chiefs, Nek, and great other like James Brown and Stevie Wonder. In 2008 Dantis' released the album Ektos Trochias which featured a more urban sound. In April 2009 Christos Dantis participated in Takis Bougas' album "Apopse ola tha sta po" along with Dimitris Mitropanos, Eleni Dimou and others singing "Exomologisi", "Apopse ola tha sta po" and "Esi gimni".

In late 2009, Dantis released the single "Pame Gia Refrain". In February 2010, Dantis released his fifteenth studio album titled Skotono (I Kill). The title track was released as the second single when Dantis performed it live on The X Factor along with "Pame Gia Refrain" in December 2009.

In April 2011, he released his new album "Ta dika mas Tragoudia" with Dimitris Mitropanos and Paschalis Terzis featuring 2 tracks. Music belongs to him and lyrics to lawyer Vasilis Kapernaros. It is a soft – rock album dealing with social matters such as drug use and political corruption. It is considered to be one of his best albums. "Me pire i nichta angalia" is the first single, while "Ta dika mas tragoudia" follows.

== Personal life ==
Christos Dantis has a son with singer Katerina Topazi. On 17 January 2011, Dantis' fourth wife, Jenny Voutsinou, gave birth to a baby girl named Marizeta, and on 14 March 2014 a baby boy named Josef.

== Discography ==
=== Albums ===
- 1990: Δαχτυλικά Αποτυπώματα
- 1992: Αμάν
- 1993: Άλα
- 1994: 4
- 1995: Τάμα
- 1996: Φώνη Βοώντος
- 1997: Τα Γιουσουφάκια
- 1998: Tournas – Dantis Live (Krifo Sholeio)
- 1999: Το Παλιό Μου Παλτό
- 2001: To Domatio
- 2003: Ena Tragoudi Akoma
- 2004: Maya Maya
- 2005: Kata Vathos
- 2006: Min Peis Pote
- 2007: Rock + Live
- 2008: Ektos Trohias
- 2010: Skotono
- 2011: Ta dika mas tragoudia
- 2013: Dantis' Hits
- 2015: To Tsouvali

=== CD singles ===
- 1987: "Turn On – 45RPM Vinyl Maxi Single"
- 1988: "Belly Dance – Vinyl"
- 1999: "Kommatia – Limited Edition CD Extra Single"
- 1999: "To palio mou palto"
- 1999: "ZW"
- 2005: "Prodosia"
- 2006: "Gia Senane Boro"
- 2007: "No Madonna"
- 2012 : "Killer Bee"

=== Digital download singles ===
- 2008: "Ektos Trohias"
- 2014: Hamenos Doryforos
- 2016: Xyrafi
- 2017: Edo Pou Vrechi
- 2017: Ehis Emena
- 2018: Kargiola Se Miso / Gia Ola Se Miso
- 2018: Me Eho Ikano
- 2018: Christougena Gia Panta
- 2019: Ime Toso Kala
- 2019: Pros To Paron

=== Album collaborations ===
- 1986: "singer : Tell me more – LP: Straight to the top (P)1986-1991"
- 1987: "vocals : LP: Moro mou Faltso (Michalis Rakintzis)"
- 1987: "vocals : LP: Tropical Sunlight SR8547 (Sandy Politi)"
- 1988: "singer : Paradosou loipon – 3xLP: Parta Ola"
- 1988: "singer : Katerina Katerinaki −3xLP: Parta Ola"
- 1989: "composer: Stou feggariou tous dromous – LP: Antitheseis (Eleni Dimou)"
- 1989: "vocals : LP: O Tasos kai oi maseles tou (Tasos Vougiatzis)"
- 1989: "singer : Ti zitas (I'll be there) – LP: Deka dekaria n.2"
- 1989: "singer : Poios eimai egw (Logical song) – LP: Deka dekaria n.2"
- 1990: "singer : Push ups (duet) – LP: Kali epityxia (Polina)"
- 1991: "singer : Just hot -jingle (Some folks) – 2xLP: Just hot hits"
- 1992: "singer : Up down and sideways – OST LP: Panw katw kai plagiws"
- 1993: "singer : AMAN – LP: Electric Funky Afro Sound Records EFAS 3012 Netherlands"
- 1994: "singer : Tha se gelasw (duet) – CD: Tha se gelasw (Kaiti Grey)"
- 1994: "singer : Len (duet) – LP: Ntoueta (Kostas Tournas)"
- 1994: "singer : Anthrwpe agapa -LP: Ntoueta (Kostas Tournas)"
- 1994: "singer : Hlie mou (duet) – LP: Xwris Revma"
- 1994: "singer : And I love her- LP: Xwris Revma"
- 1994: "singer : Honky tonk women – LP: Xwris Revma"
- 1996: "singer : O mikros tympanistis – CD: Xristougenna me t'asteria"
- 1997: "singer : Astes na kymatizoyne – CD: Den leei (Kostas Tournas)"
- 1997: "com/lyri: Fila me – CD: Exw mono esena (Katerina Topazi)"
- 1997: "composer: Tha thela – CD: Exw mono esena (Katerina Topazi)"
- 1997: "composer: Exw mono esena – CD: Exw mono esena (Katerina Topazi)"
- 1997: "composer: Exw ena agori – CD: Exw mono esena (Katerina Topazi)"
- 1997: "composer: Dixws na ponaw – CD: Exw mono esena (Katerina Topazi)"
- 1998: "composer: Maxairia – CD: Maxairia (Katerina Topazi)"
- 1999: "singer : 24.000 baci (A.Celentano) – OST CD: Safe sex"
- 1999: "singer : O Filos-CD: Omega Vibes, Diaspora"
- 1999: "composer: Tragoydi melagxoliko – CD: Xwris Risko (Nektarios Sfyrakis)"
- 2000: "composer: Stou xronou ta paixnidia : – CD: Minima (Minima)"
- 2001: "singer : Xeimwniatika bar(Duet) – CD: Sto fws mias allis meras (Ekeinos+Ekeinos)"
- 2001: "composer: Dakry gyali – CD: Tania Nassibian"
- 2001: "composer: Dipsasmeno xwma – CD: Tania Nassibian"
- 2002: "composer: Ena oneiro teleionei – CD: To paradexomai (Petros Imbrios)
- 2002: "composer: Es tu cruel/Μοιάζει να ναι σινεμά, Eurovision (Katerina Topazi)"
- 2002: "composer: Mia kardia tin exw – CD: Mia kardia (Kaiti Garbi)"
- 2003: "composer: Fotia stis nyxtes – CD: Fotia stis nyxtes (Pashalis Terzis)"
- 2003: "singer : San ta karavia (duet) – CD: Den thelw allo paramythi (Stelios Rokkos)"
- 2003: "singer : Xoris esena (live) – CD:Tragoudi sta paidia live (G.Theophanous)"
- 2003: "singer : Zoe se kalosorizw (live) – CD:Tragoudi sta paidia live (G.Theophanous)"
- 2003: "singer : Ena tragoydi akoma (live) – CD:Tragoudi sta paidia live (G.Theophanous)"
- 2003: "singer : Den exei sidera i kardia soy (live) – CD:Tragoudi sta paidia live (G.Theophanous)"
- 2003: "composer: SMS – CD: Tainia Fantasias (Filoi gia panta)"
- 2003: "composer: Alimono mas – CD: Tha gyrisei (Katerina Topazi)"
- 2004: "composer: Anapantites kliseis – CD: Proteraiotita (Elena Paparizou)"
- 2004: "composer: I wanna be a star – CD: I wanna be a star (2Lips)"
- 2004: "com/sing: No problem – CD: Petagma apo pshla (Filoi gia panta)"
- 2004: "com/sing: Eimai OK – CD: Psyxi me psyxi (Christos Pazis)"
- 2004: "composer: Vythos – CD: Vythos (Georgios Papadopoulos)"
- 2004: "composer: Genithika aneksartitos – CD: Kathe ayrio (Petros Imvrios)"
- 2005: "composer: Giatre mou – CD: Giatre mou (Flora Theodorou)"
- 2005: "composer: Fili poy kaiei – CD: Giatre mou (Flora Theodorou)"
- 2005: "composer: Roda – CD: Giatre mou (Flora Theodorou)"
- 2005: "singer : To proto mas fili (duet) – CD: Gianna Terzi"
- 2005: "singer : Spashiba baby – CD: Exw sta matia oyrano (Kaiti Garmpi)"
- 2005: "com/lyri: Akouse agori mou – CD: Exw sta matia oyrano (Kaiti Garmpi)"
- 2005: "composer: Aporo poioi theoi – CD: Exw sta matia oyrano (Kairi Garmpi)"
- 2005: "composer: Vasanaki mou – CD: Exw sta matia oyrano (Kaiti Garmpi)"
- 2005: "singer : Ayta den itane filia – CD: 667"
- 2005: "singer : Exw thn dynami – CD: Exw thn dynami (S.Korkolis/E.Vrahali/R.Rousi)"
- 2006: "composer: Casablanca – CD: San karamela (Flwra Theodorou)"
- 2006: "composer: Sbhse to kinhto mou – CD: San karamela (Flwra Theodorou)"
- 2006: "composer: San Karamela – CD: San karamela (Flwra Theodorou)"
- 2006: "composer: Me sygxwreis – CD: San karamela (Flwra Theodorou)"
- 2006: "composer: Poios me pianei – CD: San karamela (Flwra Theodorou)"
- 2006: "composer: Se thymamai – CD: Taksidia filia (Giannis Kotsiras)"
- 2006: "composer: Akatallili h wra – CD: Einai kapoies agapes (Pashalis Terzis)"
- 2007: "com/sing: A re monaxia (duet) – CD: Oneira (Vasilis Karras)"
- 2007: "com/sing: Tosi agapi – CD: Ena asteri (ZHMIA)"
- 2007: "singer : Toute la musique que j’aime CD: RENDEZ-VOUS (Nikos Aliagas & Friends)"
- 2007: "singer : Apopse ola tha sta pw – CD: Apopse ola tha sta pw (Takis Bougas)"
- 2007: "singer : Esy gymnh – CD: Apopse ola tha sta pw (Takis Bougas)"
- 2007: "singer : Eksomologhsh – CD: Apopse ola sta sta pw (Takis Bougas)"
- 2007: "composer: Ase me ston kosmo mou – CD: Trekse (Pegy Zina)"
- 2008: "composer: Ksexase me – CD: Apisteyto (Gianna Terzi)"
- 2008: "composer: Apisteyto – CD: Apisteyto (Gianna Terzi)"
- 2008: "composer: Koubenta stin koubenta – CD: Perasame me kokkino (Paola)"
- 2008: "singer : Lene gia mena – CD: Doggy style (Master Tempo)"
- 2008: "singer : Moirasia (duet) – CD: Xaramata (George Sabanis)"
- 2008: "composer: Stin fwtia – CD: Alithies kai psemata (Antonis Remos)"
- 2008: "lyricist: My number one – Dream Evil (studio/unreleased)"
- 2010: "composer: Farmako – Paola"
- 2010: "singer : Stin agapi na ta dineis ola (duet) – CD: Mazi mou se thelw (G.Papadopoulos)"
- 2010: "singer : Ena asimenio lepi – Music Story CD: Rockabilly o zoumeros (A.Aggelopoulou)"
- 2010: "singer : Prwth fora (duet) – CD: Mia fora kai enan kairo (Stavento)"
- 2010: "singer : Reflect society OST (George Papatheodorou)"
- 2010: "composer: Aggeloi stin kolasi – CD: Aggeloi stin kolasi (Kelly Kelekidou)"
- 2010: "composer: Diaspasi toy atomou – CD: Edw agapane (Elena Mpasi)"
- 2010: "composer: Ti thes edw – CD: Edw agapane (Elena Mpasi)"
- 2010: "composer: Min rwtas gia mena – CD: Edw agapane (Elena Mpasi)"
- 2010: "composer: Daxtylidakia tou kapnou – CD: Edw agapane (Elena Mpasi)"
- 2010: "composer: Lista anamonis – CD: Edw agapane (Elena Mpasi)"
- 2010: "composer: Nyxta me pairneis – CD: Edw agapane (Elena Mpasi)"
- 2010: "composer: Sbhse to kinhto sou – CD: Edw agapane (Elena Mpasi)"
- 2010: "composer: Erwtas thanatos – CD: Edw agapane (Elena Mpasi)"
- 2010: "composer: Problima mou – CD: Edw agapane (Elena Mpasi)"
- 2010: "composer: Den to syzitaw – CD: Edw agapane (Elena Mpasi)"
- 2010: "lyricist: My number one – CD: Dr.Victor & Rasta Rebels Greatest hits"
- 2011: "composer: Tha eisai katadikasmeni : Stamatis Gonidis"
- 2011: "singer : Tis kardias mou i rota – CD: Misopelaga Kardias (Dionysis Kalafatis)"
- 2011: "singer : Einai o xwrismos mia nyxta – CD: Misopelaga Kardias (Dionysis Kalafatis)"
- 2011: "composer: Koubenta stin koubenta – CD: Min ksemakreneis oneiro (Giwrgos Xaireths)"
- 2011: "composer: Kane samata – CD: Dyo nyxtes mono (Pasxalis Terzis)"
- 2011: "composer: Parasyrthika – CD: Den to koveis (Charis Kostopoulos)"
- 2011: "singer : To flytzani to mwb – CD: Oi stixoi mou kai oi filoi mou (Charis Romas)"
- 2011: "composer: Den dikaiologeisai – CD: Olokainourios (Panos Kiamos)"
- 2011: "composer: Ante na min trelathw – CD: Olokainoyrios (Panos Kiamos)"
- 2011: "composer: Fyge an mporeis – CD: Fyge an mporeis (Maria Egglezou)
- 2012: "composer: Asto na teleiwsei – CD: To paidiko moy oneiro (Panos Galinos)"
- 2012: "singer : Gia tin Ellada oneirevomai (duet) – CD: Me geia to kourema (Giannis Zouganelis)"
- 2012: "singing : Ouranos – CD: Sti mesi toy xeimwna (Dimitris Zografakis)"
- 2012: "singing : Oceano d'amore – Giorgos Volikas project"
- 2012: "composer: Koita na deis – CD: Sou xrwstaw akoma ena klama (Pegy Zina)"
- 2012: "composer: Egw agapaw anarxika – CD: Leipei pali o theos (G.Mazwnakis)"
- 2012: "singing : Agapi Parakseni – CD: Klein Mein"
- 2013: "composer: Palioxaraktiras – CD: Palioxaraktiras (Petros Imvrios)"
- 2013: "composer: Pou tha mou paei – (Athina Velissari)"
- 2013: "composer: Den ypologises kala – CD: 16 Aytoteleis istories (Notis)"

Preceded by Ruslana Lyzhichko	Eurovision Song Contest winning composers 2005	Succeeded by Tomi Putaansu
