= Xenia Ghali =

- Born: Xenia Ghali; 14 August 1989 (age 37); Paris, France
- Genres: Dance; House music; tech house; Melodic House; progressive house; Indie Dance
- Occupations: Songwriter; producer; musician; DJ
- Instruments: Piano; flute; guitar; drums; turntables
- Years active: 2013–present
- Labels: Onyx 8 Records; Heaven Music; EMI Minos; Sirup Music; Mr. 305 Inc.
- Website: xeniaghali.com

Xenia Ghali (Greek: Ξένια Γκάλη; born 14 August 1989) is a Greek songwriter, record producer and disc jockey. She is the founder of Funky Sheep Records, and is known for her dance music singles and fashion oriented videos.

== Early life ==
Ghali was born in 1989 in Paris, France and was raised in Athens, Greece to a Greek mother and Egyptian father. She is the oldest of two sisters. Ghali has been classically trained on the piano and flute since the age of 5. At the age of 15 she taught herself the guitar and the drums after forming a high school band in which she played lead guitar. During her time in the band, Ghali began songwriting. In 2008 she moved to the UK and studied music at the University of Surrey, earning a bachelor's degree in Creative Music Technology. In 2012 she moved to New York where she earned a master's degree from NYU (New York University) in Film Scoring, Music Composition and Production.

== Career ==
Ghali began DJing with turntables and played at clubs in the UK, including Ministry of Sound. In 2009 she earned 4th place in the Pan-European AACTe Apple Creative Talent Competition organized by Apple.

After earning her bachelor's degree, Ghali enrolled in the Film Scoring, Music Composition and Production Master's program at New York University. While in New York, she competed in the 2013 iStandard Producer Showcase in New York City and was one of two winners. During the summer of 2013 she worked in her home country Greece, performing at live events including the 2013 MAD Video Music Awards Kick Off Party, the 2013 MAD Video Music Awards, and the 2013 Str8 Forward Festival.

Ghali founded Funky Sheep Records in 2013 and Onyx 8 Records in 2023.

In May 2014 Ghali co-wrote and produced Ben Moon's "Change", which was also remixed by José Nunez.

In August 2014 she signed with Pitbull's record label Mr 305 and released her debut single "Broken" with Katt Rockell; the track hit Top 30 on US Dance radio. The track was released with a fashion-oriented video. Ghali released a slightly different version of "Broken" in Greek with Tamta titled "Gennithika Gia Sena". It was released in 2014 by Minos EMI. "Gennithika Gia Sena" peaked at number 2 on Greek radio. She performed it at the 2014 MADwalk – Fashion Music Project.

In summer of 2014 she collaborated with Greek Pop star Sakis Rouvas and co-wrote and produced his single "Open Eyes" which he performed at the World Music Awards. "Open Eyes" was also released in Greek titled "Pio Psila". Ghali also remixed a number of tracks on Mr 305, such as Pitbull's "Fun", which featured Chris Brown and for Mr Vegas' "My Jam", which featured Pitbull.

Later in 2014 Ghali spent time working in the US and performed with Erick Morillo on Hollywood Hamilton's 'Remix Top 30'. Wyclef Jean made a guest appearance during her set and performed their single "Get Dirty". The two also performed "Get Dirty" at the 2015 SXSW in Austin, Texas; Ghali operated the turntables and played the piano. The track was released in 2015 on her label Funky Sheep Records.

Ghali presented an award to Hardwell at the 2015 Winter Music Conference IDMAs in Miami, Florida. In 2016, Ghali released "Under These Lights" with Ethan Thompson through her label Funky Sheep Records. On 18 June 2016, the single reached number 1 on the US Billboard Dance Club Songs chart. The chart position resulted in an interview with Billboard, as well as interviews with The Huffington Post and AOL.

Ghali also performed "Under These Lights" on Greece's X Factor and is a brand ambassador for G-Star Raw, Adidas and Eastpak in Greece. Ghali's single, "Places", was released at the end of 2016 and features vocals from singer-songwriter and actress Raquel Castro. The song also has a music video starring Teen Wolf star Ryan Kelley. "Places" earned Ghali her second number 1 Billboard Dance Club Song Chart position.

On January 26, 2018 Ghali released her single "Stick Around" with EDX's label Sirup Music. Regarding the story behind the release on Syrup Music, the female artist revealed the following: "EDX was actually one of the DJs who received the song. I found out he played it at one of his shows in San Francisco and I reached out to thank him for the support. Then to my surprise he told me that he was interested in releasing it under Sirup Music (his label) and of course I agreed!"

On September 27, 2019, Xenia Ghali's beat from "Black Betty's Worldwide" was used as a sample in "Get Ready" by Pitbull featuring Blake Shelton. The song released as a single on January 30, 2020, and the music video premiered on Pitbull's YouTube channel on February 10, 2020. Ghali received producer credit for her contribution of the instrumental to the song.

Ghali has DJed at clubs including the Ministry of Sound, Cavo Paradiso, Cielo and Nikki Beach and has played alongside DJs including Steve Aoki, Erick Morillo, Martin Solveig, Don Diablo, DubVision, Cedric Gervais and Jay Hardway. She has also headlined festivals including the Colour Day Festival, Lindos Summer Paradise and Angel's Cafe Summer Paradise.

== Fashion ==
Ghali discussed fashion in relation to DJs during the "From the Dance Floor to The Runway: Fashion & Music" panel at the 2015 Winter Music Conference. She also wrote the soundtrack for Michael Costello's 2015 fashion show video. Ghali has collaborated with brands and designers including Armani Exchange, Yves Saint Laurent, Calvin Klein, H&M and Folli Follie. She has been featured in magazines including Cosmopolitan Greece, Esquire Greece, Hello! Greece, InStyle Greece and Madame Figaro.

== Discography ==
=== Solo singles ===
2013

- Xenia Ghali featuring Jessica Sutta - "Out with a Bang" (Funky Sheep Records)

2014

- Xenia Ghali featuring Katt Rockell – "Broken" (Mr 305/Exit 8/Funky Sheep Records)
- Tamta featuring Xenia Ghali – "Gennithika Gia Sena" (Minos EMI/Universal)

2015

- Xenia Ghali featuring Wyclef Jean – "Get Dirty" (Mr 305/Exit 8/Funky Sheep Records)
- Xenia Ghali featuring Heymous Molly – "Black Betty's Worldwide" (Funky Sheep Records)

2016

- Xenia Ghali – "Under These Lights" (Funky Sheep Records)
- Xenia Ghali featuring Raquel Castro – "Places" (Funky Sheep Records)

2018

- Xenia Ghali – "Stick Around" (Sirup Music)
- Xenia Ghali – "Lay In Your Arms" (Sirup Music)
- Xenia Ghali & Luca Debonaire – "The Good Feelin'" (Rawtone)
- Xenia Ghali & Block & Crown – "Spectacular" (Black Lizard)
- Xenia Ghali & Luca Debonaire – "Coming Back" (Which Bottle?)
- Xenia Ghali & Popcorn Poppers – "About Your Love" (Which Bottle?)

2019

- Xenia Ghali – "Turn Off The Rain" (Sirup Music)

2020

- Xenia Ghali – "Rebel Soul" (Up All Night)
- Xenia Ghali – "Purgatory" (Pinkstar Black)

2022

- Xenia Ghali & Joanne – "Rapture" (Minos EMI/Universal)

2023

- Xenia Ghali – "I Miss You" (Onyx 8 Records)
- Xenia Ghali – "Undressed" (Onyx 8 Records)
- Xenia Ghali & Kid Moxie – "New God" (Minos EMI/Universal)

2024

- Xenia Ghali – "Closer" (City of Drums Black Label)
- Mert Harmankaya & Xenia Ghali – "Agathon" (Onyx 8 Records)
- Xenia Ghali – "Shudder" (Onyx 8 Records)

=== Songwriting and production credits ===
2013

- Xenia Ghali featuring Jessica Sutta – "Out with a Bang" (Funky Sheep Records)

2014

- Tamta featuring Xenia Ghali – "Gennithika Gia Sena" (Minos EMI/Universal)
- Xenia Ghali featuring Katt Rockell – "Broken" (Mr 305/Exit 8/Funky Sheep Records)
- Sakis Rouvas – "Open Eyes" (Minos EMI/Universal)
- Sakis Rouvas – "Pio Psila" (Minos EMI/Universal)
- Ben Moon – "Change" (Roklyfe)

2015

- Xenia Ghali featuring Wyclef Jean – "Get Dirty" (Mr 305/Exit 8/Funky Sheep Records)
- Pitbull featuring Chris Brown (Xenia Ghali Remix) -"Fun" (RCA Records)

2016

- Xenia Ghali – "Under These Lights" (Funky Sheep Records)
- Xenia Ghali featuring Raquel Castro – "Places" (Funky Sheep Records)

2018

- Xenia Ghali – "Stick Around" (Sirup Music)
- Xenia Ghali – "Lay In Your Arms" (Sirup Music)
- Xenia Ghali & Luca Debonaire – "The Good Feelin'" (Rawtone)
- Xenia Ghali & Block & Crown – "Spectacular" (Black Lizard)
- Xenia Ghali & Luca Debonaire – "Coming Back" (Which Bottle?)
- Xenia Ghali & Popcorn Poppers – "About Your Love" (Which Bottle?)

2019

- Xenia Ghali – "Turn Off The Rain" (Sirup Music)

2020

- Xenia Ghali – "Rebel Soul" (Up All Night)
- Pitbull featuring Blake Shelton – "Get Ready" (Mr. 305 Inc.)
- Xenia Ghali – "Purgatory" (Pinkstar Black)

2022

- Xenia Ghali & Joanne – "Rapture" (Minos EMI/Universal)

2023

- Xenia Ghali – "I Miss You" (Onyx 8 Records)
- Xenia Ghali – "Undressed" (Onyx 8 Records)
- Xenia Ghali & Kid Moxie – "New God" (Minos EMI/Universal)

2024

- Xenia Ghali – "Closer" (City of Drums Black Label)
- Mert Harmankaya & Xenia Ghali – "Agathon" (Onyx 8 Records)
- Xenia Ghali – "Shudder" (Onyx 8 Records)
