= Greece in the Eurovision Song Contest 2007 =

- Eurovision Song Contest 2007
- Participating broadcaster: Hellenic Broadcasting Corporation (ERT)
- Country: Greece
- Selection process: Eurovision 2007
- Selection date: 28 February 2007

Competing entry
- Song: "Yassou Maria"
- Artist: Sarbel
- Songwriters: Alex Papaconstantinou; Marcus Englöf; Markus Sepehrmanesh

Placement
- Final result: 7th, 139 points

Participation chronology

Greece was represented at the Eurovision Song Contest 2007 with the song "Yassou Maria", written by Alex Papaconstantinou, Marcus Englöf, and Markus Sepehrmanesh, and performed by Sarbel. The Greek participating broadcaster, the Hellenic Broadcasting Corporation (ERT), organised the national final Eurovision 2007 to select its entry for the contest. The event, which took place on 28 February 2007, saw three acts—Sarbel, Tamta, and Christos Dantis—compete to be the Greek representative.

Following the selection of "Yassou Maria", a music video for the song was released and Sarbel embarked on an international promotional tour for the entry to Russia, Bulgaria, Cyprus, Sweden and Romania. As Greece had placed highly at the previous year's contest, it automatically qualified for the final at this year's contest. Greece appeared tenth out of the 24 countries competing in the final and placed seventh with 139 points.

== Background ==
Prior to the 2007 contest, Greece had participated in the Eurovision Song Contest 27 times since its first entry in 1974. To this point, the nation won the contest once, in 2005 with the song "My Number One" performed by Helena Paparizou, and placed third twice: in 2001 with the song "Die for You" performed by the duo Antique and in 2004 with "Shake It" performed by Sakis Rouvas. Following the introduction of semi-finals for the 2004 contest, Greece qualified for the final each year. Its least successful result was in 1998, when the nation placed 20th with the song "Mia krifi evaisthisia" by Thalassa, receiving only 12 points in total, all from Cyprus.

As part of its duties as participating broadcaster, the Hellenic Broadcasting Corporation (ERT) organises the selection of its entry in the Eurovision Song Contest and broadcasts the event in the country. For the three contests preceding 2007 (2004, 2005, and 2006), ERT had selected high-profile artists internally and set up national finals to choose the song.

== Before Eurovision ==
=== Eurovision 2007 ===
Eurovision 2007 was the Greek national final developed by ERT to select its entry for the Eurovision Song Contest 2007. The competition took place on 28 February 2007 at the Athinon Arena Music Hall in Athens, hosted by Fotis Sergoulopoulos and Maria Bakodimou and televised on ERT, ERT SAT as well as online via the ERT website ert.gr. According to the rules of the event, the songs were to be performed in English and the winner selected by a 50/50 combination of public televoting/SMS and a jury assembled by ERT. The jury consisted of Mimis Plessas, Dimitris Kontopoulos, Giorgos Andrikaki, Petros Kostopoulos, Eleonora Meleti, Johnny Kalimeris, Konstantis Spyropoulos, Rea Toutounzi, Barry Viniker and Antonis Karatzikos. ERT set aside a budget of €700,000 to pay for the participation, including the national final, a promotional tour and travel related to the contest.

==== Competing entries ====
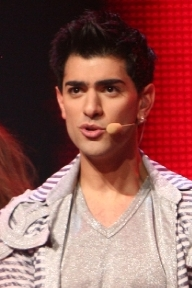
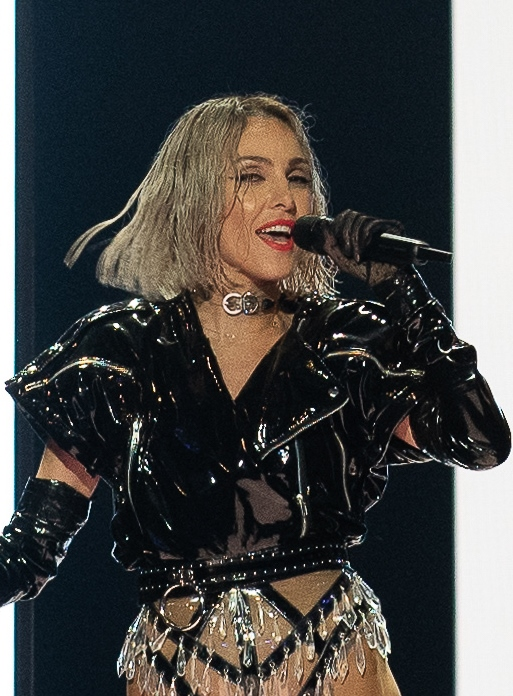
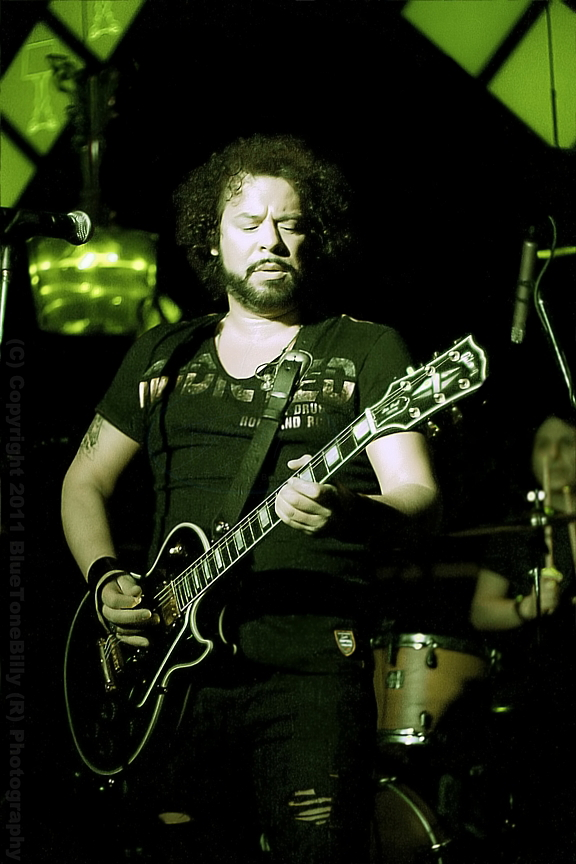
Sarbel, Tamta and Christos Dantis took part in the national final to be the Greek representative for the Eurovision Song Contest 2007.

Sarbel, Tamta, and Christos Dantis were the three acts announced by ERT on 16 February 2007 as the participants in the national final. The announcement was made during a press conference held at the Central Athens Hotel. C:Real and Michalis Hatzigiannis were also mentioned as entrants who were considered, however, they were unable to meet the participation deadline, bringing the total number of participants to three.

The competing songs were revealed on 7 February 2007 during a press conference held at the Athens Plaza Hotel that was broadcast on ERT SAT and Star News. ERT assigned composers to each entrant, who was then able to select a song of their choosing in conjunction with the broadcaster. Entrants were given the freedom to perform their selected song in a way of their choosing. Sarbel chose "Yassou Maria", with lyrics by Markus Sepehrmanesh and composed by Greek-Swedish composer team Alex Papaconstantinou and Marcus Englof, who had previously written music for 2005 winner Helena Paparizou. Sarbel described the song as "a whole new style within itself" because of its blend of pop, Latin, and Greek sounds. Tamta selected the ballad "With Love", composed by Eurovision veteran Nikos Terzis with lyrics by Posidonas Giannopoulos. The song included ethnic Balkan sounds in addition to the main melody and a part of the song was in Greek. Lastly, Dantis chose "No Madonna", a song composed by himself with lyrics by Natalia Germanou. Together in 2005, they also composed the winning Eurovision song for Greece "My Number One", performed by Paparizou. The song was rock-dance with an ethnic Greek twist.

==== Final ====
The three entries competed at the final on 28 February 2007 and "Yassou Maria" performed by Sarbel was selected as the Greek representative for the Eurovision Song Contest 2007, garnering nearly 40% of the cumulative vote. In addition to the performances of the competing entries, the interval acts featured guest performances by Dmitry Koldun (who would represent Belarus in 2007), Elitsa Todorova and Stoyan Yankulov (who would represent Bulgaria in 2007), Evridiki and Dimitris Korgialas (who would represent Cyprus in 2007), DJ Bobo (who would represent Switzerland in 2007), Michalis Hatzigiannis (who represented Cyprus in 1998), and singers Natasa Theodoridou and Despina Olympiou. Former Greek Eurovision representative Paparizou was also present at the show, and the hosts Sergoulopoulos and Bakodimou provided comedy skits and an award show to past Eurovision entries.

Final – 28 February 2007
R/O	Artist	Song	Songwriter(s)	Jury (Note: The percentages in the respective columns for jury and televote do not total to 100% as each voting method was only worth 50% of the total vote.)	Televote	Total	Place
1	Sarbel	"Yassou Maria"	Alex Papaconstantinou; Marcus Englöf; Markus Sepehrmanesh	17.46%	22.23%	39.69%	1
2	Tamta	"With Love"	Nikos Terzis; Posidonas Giannopoulos	17.22%	11.80%	29.02%	3
3	Christos Dantis	"No Madonna"	Christos Dantis; Natalia Germanou	15.31%	15.97%	31.29%	2

=== Promotion ===
To promote the entry, a music video of "Yassou Maria" was filmed in the Gazi neighbourhood of Athens, specifically on Ermou Street and at the Technopolis museum. Directed by Giorgos Gavalos, it premiered on 12 March 2007 in Helsinki. ERT also created a four-part television special for their channel NET, which premiered on 19 April and aired up until the final in May. The show saw Fotis Sergoulopoulos and Maria Bakodimou travel to places of significance in Sarbel's upbringing, meeting with his friends and family to learn more about his life.

Further promotion was accomplished through an international tour, with Sarbel's first stop being in Russia from 20 through 22 March 2007. There, he performed at the opening of the Greek pavilion of the MITT International Tourism Exhibition in Moscow and was received by the Greek embassy for a celebration of Greek Independence Day. Other activities included television interviews on Channel One (C1R), Muz-TV, Nastroyeniye on TV Centre and MTV, and interviews for GDE magazine and newspapers KP and Moskovskij Komsomolets (MK). Following Russia, the next stop on the tour was Sofia, Bulgaria from 26 through 28 March. Sarbel was a guest on Bulgarian National Television's (BNT) weekly entertainment show Vsichki pred ekrana and was interviewed by Bulgarian National Radio. The next day, he was a guest on BNT's morning show and shot a scene for bTV's Slavi Show. Other activities included interviews on music channels MAD TV Bulgaria and Balkanika TV, and for the Nov Folk, Koj, Eva, Express and Joy magazines. The third stop was in Istanbul through 1 April, Turkey where Sarbel was interviewed by television stations ATV, Doğan News Agency and Number 1 TV, radio station Metro FM and newspaper Sabah. His appearance on the show Makina saw him perform "Yassou Maria" in addition to a few Turkish-language songs, including a duet with Turkish singer Ebru Gündeş. A visit to Cyprus from 14 April came next, where Sarbel was interviewed on the RIK morning show 7 to 10 and performed his entry on the game show Pame Evropi. He later was a guest on television stations ANT1 Cyprus and Music Box and was photographed for an article in Cappuccino magazine. Stockholm, Sweden followed Cyprus where Sarbel gave interviews to several media outlets including Expressen, Aftonbladet, Punkt, Stockholm Finest, Plaza Kvinna, Blupp, Gylleneskor.se and Sveriges Television. The stop culminated with a nightclub performance where he sang "Yassou Maria" amongst several songs from his repertoire. The final stop on the promotional tour for the Greek entry was Bucharest, Romania. Sarbel performed on TVR2's Dis de seara and on the network's morning show Tonomatul where viewers were able to call or send SMS messages for the singer to respond to. Other activities included interviews on TVR's Bagag...Pentru Europa, Romantica's Teo, television stations Antena and Kiss TV, magazine Cool Girl and the radio programme Psihologul muzical, while additional performances of "Yassou Maria" were seen on the shows Surprize, surprize, De 3 X Femeie and Danutz SRL.

== At Eurovision ==
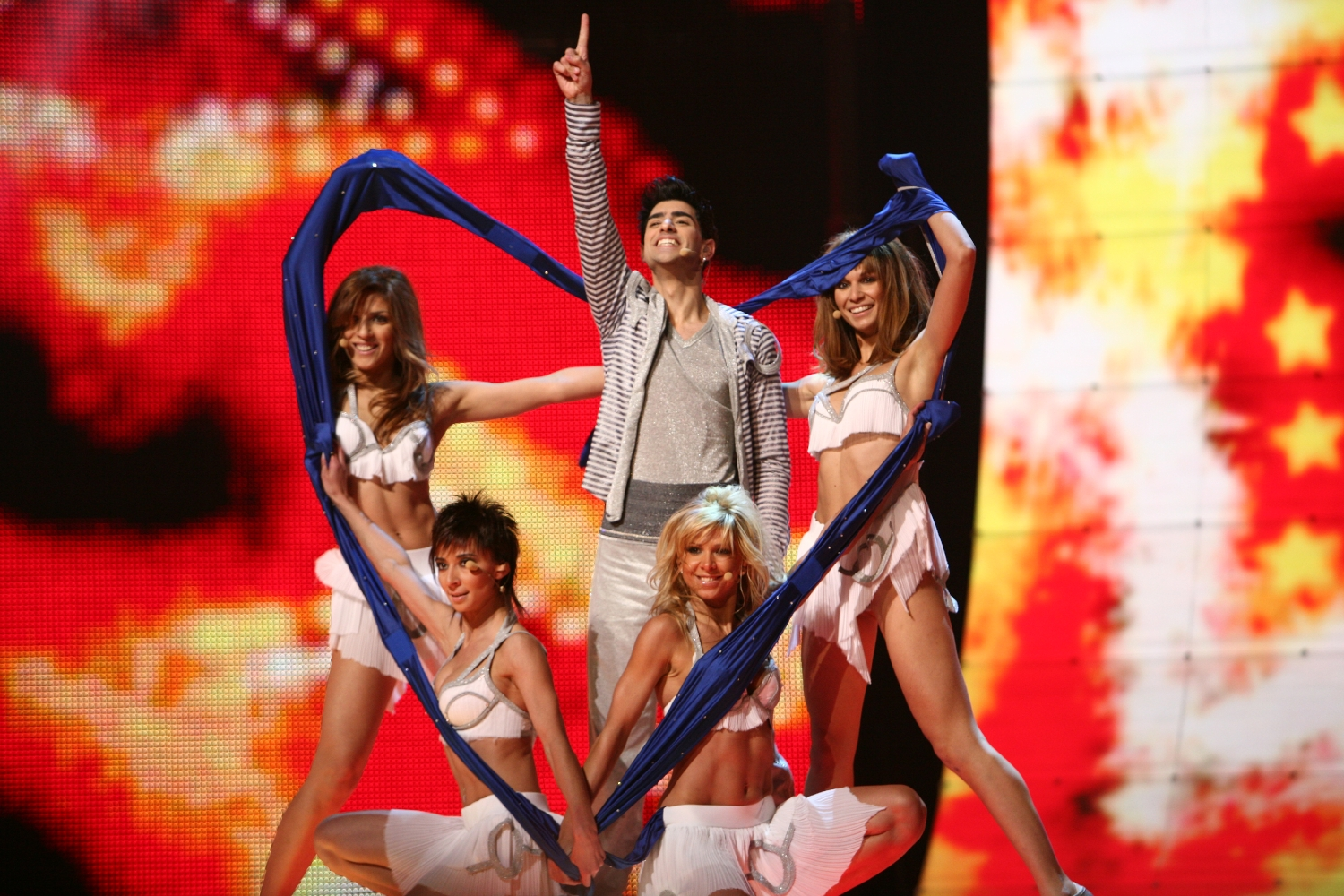
Sarbel at Eurovision 2007 Final in Helsinki, Finland

The Eurovision Song Contest 2007 took place at Hartwall Arena in Helsinki, Finland, and consisted of a semi-final on 10 May and the final on 12 May 2007. According to the Eurovision rules, all participating countries, except the host nation, the "Big Four", consisting of France, Germany, Spain and the United Kingdom, and the top nine nations with high placements at the previous year's contest, were required to qualify from the semi-final to compete for the final. The top 10 countries from the semi-final then progressed to the final to join them. As Anna Vissi had reached ninth place in the 2006 contest, Greece was not required to perform in the semi-final. The semi-final and final were televised live in Greece on NET with a radio broadcast on Second Programme; the final also had an additional radio broadcast on NET 105.8. Commentary during the shows was provided by Sergoulopoulos and Bakodimou.

=== Performances ===
Sarbel and his dancers took part in rehearsals at ERT's studios until 4 May, leaving the next day for the contest in Helsinki. They then took part in rehearsals at the Hartwall Arena on 7 and 8 May, followed by a dress rehearsal on 12 May. The Greek performance was choreographed by Maria Lyraraki, who had previously filled this role for the Greek entry in 2004 and as a team with Fokas Evangelinos in 2006. The costumes worn by the performers were designed by Lakis Gavalas. Greece's entry for the 2007 contest finished in seventh place at the 12 May final with 139 points, one point ahead of Armenia and six points behind Belarus. Viewership of the final was high in Greece, with 85.7% of the viewing population (3,414,130 viewers) watching during the Greek performance and 89.2% watching during the announcement of the results of the final.

=== Voting ===
Voting during the three shows involved each country awarding points from 1-8, 10 and 12 to the other competing countries; counties were not allowed to register votes for themselves. All countries participating in the contest were required to use televoting and/or SMS voting during both evenings of the contest. In the event of technical difficulties, or if the votes of the country did not meet the EBU threshold, then a back-up jury's results were to be used. Greece awarded its top 12 points from televoting to Cyprus in the semi-final and to Bulgaria in the final. The nation received 139 points in the final, placing seventh. This result included the top 12 points from both Bulgaria and Cyprus. ERT appointed Alexis Kostalas as its spokesperson to announce the Greek voting results during the shows, a task he had performed since the 1998 contest. The tables below visualise a complete breakdown of points awarded to Greece in the final of the Eurovision Song Contest 2007, as well as by the country in the semi-final and final.

==== Points awarded to Greece ====
Points awarded to Greece (Final)
Score	Country
12 points	Bulgaria; Cyprus
10 points	Germany; Romania; United Kingdom
8 points	Armenia; Belgium
7 points	Albania; Hungary
6 points	Moldova
5 points	Iceland; Netherlands
4 points	Georgia; Serbia; Sweden; Switzerland; Turkey
3 points	Belarus; Bosnia and Herzegovina; Czech Republic; France; Macedonia
2 points	Spain
1 point	Denmark; Israel

==== Points awarded by Greece ====
Points awarded by Greece (Semi-final)
Score	Country
12 points	Cyprus
10 points	Bulgaria
8 points	Albania
7 points	Belarus
6 points	Georgia
5 points	Serbia
4 points	Andorra
3 points	Moldova
2 points	Switzerland
1 point	Latvia

Points awarded by Greece (Final)
Score	Country
12 points	Bulgaria
10 points	Moldova
8 points	Russia
7 points	Ukraine
6 points	Armenia
5 points	Belarus
4 points	Serbia
3 points	Georgia
2 points	Romania
1 point	Spain
