= Replay (Tamta song) =

2019 song by Tamta

Single by Tamta
- Released: 27 February 2019
- Length: 2:53
- Label: Minos EMI
- Songwriters: Alex Papaconstantinou; Albin Nedler; Geraldo Sandell; Kristoffer Fogelmark; Viktor Svensson
- Producer: Alex Papaconstantinou and Maxim Vashinskiy

Tamta singles chronology
"Na Me Pareis Makria" (2018)	"Replay" (2019)	"Señorita" (2019)

Eurovision Song Contest 2019 entry
- Country: Cyprus
- Artist: Tamta
- Language: English
- Composers: Alex Papaconstantinou; Albin Nedler; Geraldo Sandell; Kristoffer Fogelmark; Viktor Svensson
- Lyricists: Alex Papaconstantinou; Albin Nedler; Geraldo Sandell; Kristoffer Fogelmark; Viktor Svensson

Finals performance
- Semi-final result: 9th
- Semi-final points: 149
- Final result: 13th
- Final points: 109

Entry chronology
- ◄ "Fuego" (2018)
- "Running" (2020) ►

"Replay" is a song by Georgian-born Greek singer Tamta. The song title and artist were revealed on 21 December 2018 by CyBC. The song was written by Alex P. A preview of the song was published on 24 February 2019. The song was performed during the first semi-final of the Eurovision Song Contest 2019 as the Cypriot entry and qualified to the final, where it placed 13th with 109 points.

== At Eurovision ==
=== Tel Aviv ===
The song was chosen to represent Cyprus in the Eurovision Song Contest 2019 after Tamta was internally selected by the Cypriot broadcaster. On 28 January 2019, a special allocation draw was held which placed each country into one of the two semi-finals, as well as which half of the show they would perform in. Cyprus was placed into the first semi-final, to be held on 14 May 2019, and was scheduled to perform in the first half of the show. Once all the competing songs for the 2019 contest had been released, the running order for the semi-finals was decided by the show's producers rather than through another draw, so that similar songs were not placed next to each other. Cyprus performed first, and gained enough votes to qualify for the final. It finished in 13th with 109 points.

== Track listing ==
- Digital download
1. "Replay" – 2:53

== Charts ==
Chart (2019)	Peak position
Belgium (Ultratip Bubbling Under Wallonia)	8
Estonia (Eesti Tipp-40)	27
Greece (IFPI)	2
Lithuania (AGATA)	21
Sweden (Sverigetopplistan)	72
UK Singles Downloads (Official Charts)	87

== Release history ==
Region	Date	Format	Label	Ref.
Various	27 February 2019	Digital download; streaming	Minos EMI	
