= Agapise me =

Agapise me Αγάπησέ με

Studio album by Tamta
- Released: 16 May 2007
- Genres: Pop, dance
- Length: 52:38
- Label: EMI Greece

Tamta chronology
Tamta (2006)	Agapise me Αγάπησέ με (2007)	Tharros I alitheia (2010)

Singles from Tamta
- 1. "With Love" Released: February 2007; 2. "Agapise me" Released: May 2007; 3. "Agapo (Wanna Play)" Released: September 2007; 4. "Mia stigmi esi ki ego" Released: November 2007; 5. "Ela sto rythmo" Released: March 2008

Alternative cover
- Repackaged Edition

Agapise me (Αγάπησέ με) is the second studio album by Greek pop singer and Super Idol contestant Tamta. It was released on 16 May 2007 by Minos EMI. The album was repackaged in early 2008 with Tamta's CD single Mia stigmi esi ki ego/Ela sto rhythmo.

"Prin ksana erotefto" is a Greek version of the song "A Rose in the Wind" by Anggun. "I zoi einai oraia" was the Greek entry for the 2007 Mediterranean Song Contest.

== Singles ==
Five singles were released from the album: "With Love", "Agapise me", "Agapo (Wanna Play)", "Mia stigmi esi ki ego", and "Ela sto rhythmo". "With Love" was Tamta's entry in a three-entry national final to be Greece's entry in the Eurovision Song Contest 2007, while the latter two singles were also featured on a two-track CD single. The song "Mia stigmi esi ki ego" was used by the candy company "Lacta" for sales ads and the song "Ela sto rhythmo" was used as the main theme song of the Greek TV series Latremenoi Mou Geitones.

== Track listing ==
1. "Prin ksana erotefto" – 4:04
2. "Pantou anteho ego" – 3:23
3. "Pame parea (Rebelde)" – 3:32
4. "Agapo (Wanna Play)" (featuring Akis Deihimos) – 3:44
5. "Treis fores" – 4:11
6. "Etsi aisthanomai" – 4:36
7. "I zoi einai oraia" – 3:01
8. "Psemata" – 4:03
9. "Oti kai na peis" – 4:10
10. "Agapise me" – 4:06
11. "Ki an m'agapas" – 3:50
12. "De se fovamai" – 3:44
13. "Home Is Everywhere" – 3:22
14. "With Love" – 3:03

New Edition

1. "Mia stigmi esi ki ego" – 3:11
2. "Ela sto rythmo" – 2:54

== Charts ==
Chart	Providers	Peak position
Greek Albums Chart	IFPI	4
Cypriot Albums Chart	All Records Top 20	10
