= Liko =

Swedish medical technology company

Liko AB
- Industry: Medical equipment
- Founded: 1979
- Headquarters: Luleå, Sweden
- Products: Patient lifts, slings, lifting accessories
- Parent: Hill-Rom

Liko AB is a Swedish manufacturer of patient lifting equipment based in Luleå . It is owned by Hill-Rom, a US-based corporation located in Batesville, IN.

The company develops, manufactures and markets mainly mobile and stationary (overhead) patient lifts, slings and other lifting accessories.

Most of Liko's products are sold outside of Sweden. The largest markets are North America, Western Europe and the Asia-Pacific region. Liko has about a 15-20% share of the world market for patient lifts and is thereby one of the most important suppliers in its segment.

Liko was established in 1979.
