= Under These Lights =

Single by Xenia Ghali
- Released: March 1, 2016
- Recorded: 2016
- Genre: EDM; dance-pop; house
- Length: 3:38; 4:38 (extended mix)
- Label: Funky Sheep Records
- Songwriter(s): Xenia Ghali; Ethan Thompson; Colasacco Carlo Christian
- Producer(s): Ghali

Xenia Ghali singles chronology
"Renaissance" (2015)	"Under These Lights" (2016)

"Under These Lights" is a song recorded, written, and produced by Greek DJ Xenia Ghali, featuring vocals by singer/songwriter Ethan Thompson. The song was also written by Thompson and Colasacco Carlo Christian. The track was released on March 1, 2016 by Ghali's personal label Funky Sheep Records. The single also marks a rarity for female DJ/remixers/producers, as it reached number one on Billboard's Dance Club Songs chart in its June 18, 2016 issue.

== Background ==
In an interview with Billboard about the single and its message, Ghali replied, "The song is extremely important to me... I really let go and just focused on what felt right to me. Sonically, I just wanted it to be something that depicted my emotions and passion. Lyrically, I am very proud of what the song stands for. The world is in a very negative place at the moment. There is a lot of hate, anger, racism, discrimination and aggression. "Under These Lights" speaks of the importance of unity and love amongst all of us. It depicts a very optimistic and euphoric message, one which I feel the world is missing right now." Ghali, who did the production work including the drop personally, also used "a synth I built from my own voice" and noted that Thompson's vocal were actually pitched up so she can merged hers with his, but "However, we decided not to include his name in the [credits for] the single because his personal project, which he is very focused on, has a completely different musical vibe than "Under These Lights."

The song's lyrics ("Under these lights, embracing all life/We are lost within these beautiful sights … Let's spread the warmth we've found") were later used in a commentary by Billboard about the 2016 Orlando nightclub shooting and the tragedies involving similar places frequented by the LGBTQ community.

== Track listing ==
Under These Lights - Single
No.	Title	Writer(s)	Producer(s)	Length
1.	"Under These Lights (Radio Edit)"	Xenia Ghali, Ethan Thompson & Colasacco Carlo Christian	Ghali	3:38
2.	"Under These Lights (Extended Mix)"	Xenia Ghali, Ethan Thompson & Colasacco Carlo Christian	Ghali	4:39
3.	"Under These Lights (Vocal Edit)"	Xenia Ghali, Ethan Thompson & Colasacco Carlo Christian	Ghali	3:40
Total length:				11:55

Under These Lights (Acoustic Version) - Single
No.	Title	Writer(s)	Producer(s)	Length
1.	"Under These Lights (Acoustic Version)"	Xenia Ghali, Ethan Thompson & Colasacco Carlo Christian	Ghali	02:30
Total length:				02:30

Under These Lights (Djlw Remix) - Single
No.	Title	Writer(s)	Producer(s)	Length
1.	"Under These Lights (Djlw Remix)"	Xenia Ghali, Ethan Thompson & Colasacco Carlo Christian	Xenia Ghali & Djlw	04:49
Total length:				04:49
