= Tamta (album) =

Studio album by Tamta
- Released: 2006
- Genres: Pop, Dance
- Length: 35:30 (Original Release); 38:30 (Repackaged Edition)
- Label: EMI

Tamta chronology
Tamta (2006)	Agapise Me (2007)

Singles from Tamta
- 1. "Ftais"; 2. "Den Telionei Etsi I Agapi"; 3. "Tornero-Tromero" Released: 14 June 2006; 4. "Einai Krima"

Tamta is the first studio album by Greek pop singer and Super Idol contestant Tamta. It was released in 2006 by Minos EMI.

== Track listing ==
1. "Tornero – Tromero" (featuring Mihai Traistariu) (Repackaged Edition Only) – 3:00
2. "Den Telionei Etsi I Agapi" – 3:17
3. "Ftais" (Faraway) – 3:19
4. "Mi Fovase" – 3:19
5. "Einai Krima" (featuring Grigoris Petrakos) – 3:19
6. "O,ti Telionei Pona" – 3:35
7. "Ipervoles" – 3:06
8. "Tora Pos Na Sviso" – 4:22
9. "Mi Mou Zitas Na Xehaso" (Je N' Oublie Rien) – 4:01
10. "Ti Sou Ftaio Ego Pou Toso S'agapo" – 3:29
11. "Den S' Afino" – 3:50
