= Stan (singer) =

Greek singer, songwriter and fashion model

- Born: Stratos Antipariotis; August 1, 1987 (age 39); Athens, Greece
- Genres: Hip Hop, R&B
- Years active: 2011-present

Stan (Greek: Στράτος Αντιπαριώτης, born Stratos Antipariotis on August 1, 1987 in Athens, Greece), is a Greek singer, songwriter and fashion model.

== Early career ==
Stratos, better known in Greece by his stage name "Stan", is a Greek young artist. Coming from the island of Paros, where he grew up, he took his first steps as a professional in the music industry in December 2009 writing the lyrics for the debut album of the Greek group Vegas for the song “Giati”. At the beginning of his career he also worked with Bo for the song “Tha’thela”, Nicko for the hit “Last Summer”, Claydee Lupa & Dimension-X for “Call Me”, Sakis Rouvas for the song “To Allo Sou Miso” and Katerina Stikoudi for her song “6 Ekatommyria”.

== Debut ==
In April 2011, Stratos makes his official debut as a singer. The song “An Mou Ftanan Ta Lefta” was released by EMI Music and achieved huge success. His next digital solo single “Taxidepse Me” was released in August 2011 and gained remarkable reviews from both media and fans, confirming that the “STAN phenomenon” was about to conquer the Greek music industry. A few months later, in October 2011, he worked with Nebma for the song “Sto Myalo Mou” and in December 2011 he released a special Christmas song, “Fetos Ta Xristougenna” for his fans which was produced in just three weeks.

In March 2012 while working on his first solo album, he releases his next single “1 Vradi” and produces the new hit “Tora” for the Greek superstar Sakis Rouvas. A few days later he begins his U.S. Tour and a variety of live shows in New York, Chicago and Boston. For over a month in the country, he meets with some of the most prestigious people of the music industry such as Gorilla TEK and Myquan Jackson.

In June 2012 Stratos releases his new single “Kalokairini Drosia” and one week later first album titled “STAN”, is released as while continuing his European Summer Tour. In October 2012 Stratos returned from his first Australian tour where he performed live in Sydney, Melbourne and Brisbane while his newly released single “Oti Pio Omorfo Eho Dei” was climbing the charts.

== 2013 ==
In March 2013 Stratos released his latest single “Se Thelo Edo” with more than 2,000,000 views on YouTube, less than two months after the first day of its screening. In May 2013 he began his second tour in the US and Canada and visits Toronto, Hollywood and New York City or a number of live performances while participated at the GABBY Awards in Los Angeles.

== Discography ==
=== Singles ===
- An Mou Ftanan Ta Lefta (2011)
- Taxidepse Me (2011)
- Sto Myalo Mou (2011)
- Fetos Ta Xristougenna (2011)
- 1 Vradi (2012)
- Kalokairini Drosia (2012)
- Oti Pio Omorfo Eho Dei, EMI Music (2012)
- Se Thelo Edo, EMI Music (2013)
- Paixnidia Erotika, EMI Music (2013)

=== Album ===
- STAN, EMI Music (2012)
- Na Me Eroteftis, EMI Music (2013)
- 11:11 (2016)
- Pedi Tou Humona (2021)
