= Stavros Konstantinou =

Greek Cypriot singer (born 1984)

- Born: 25 August 1984 (age 42)
- Origin: Nicosia, Cyprus
- Genre: Pop music
- Years active: 2004—

Stavros Konstantinou (Σταύρος Κωνσταντίνου) (born 25 August 1984 in Nicosia, Cyprus) is a Greek Cypriot singer.

In 2013, Konstantinou released "Ponese Me", composed by Giorgos Theofanous with lyrics by Natalia Germanou.

On 30 August 2025, Konstantinou performed the national anthem shared by Cyprus and Greece before their EuroBasket 2025 game at the Spyros Kyprianou arena in Limassol.

He is involved in supporting Cyprus Anti Cancer society. In November 2025, he gave a live show at Ayia Napa Marina Christmas village celebrations.
