= Tamta =

Georgian-born Greek singer (born 1981)

Tamta Τάμτα თამთა
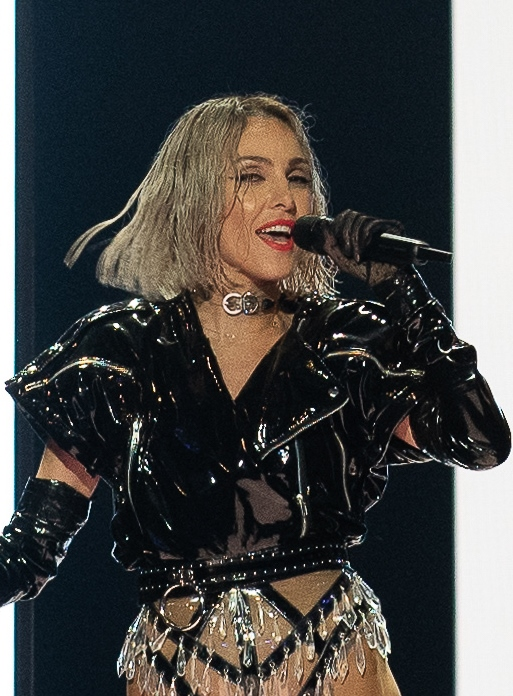
- Born: Tamta Goduadze; 10 January 1981 (age 45); Tbilisi, Georgian SSR, Soviet Union
- Citizenship: Georgia; Greece
- Education: Tbilisi State University
- Partner: Paris Kassidokostas-Latsis (2015–present)
- Children: Annie Khachvani
- Musical career
- Origin: Athens, Greece
- Genres: Pop; dance
- Occupation: Singer
- Instrument: Vocals
- Years active: 2004–present
- Labels: EMI; Minos EMI
- Website: www.tamta.gr

Tamta Goduadze (Georgian: თამთა გოდუაძე; IPA: [tamta goduadze]; Greek: Τάμτα Γκοντουάτζε, romanized: Támta Gkontouátze; born 10 January 1981), known mononymously as Tamta, is a Georgian-born Greek singer. She first achieved popularity in Greece in 2004 for her participation in Super Idol Greece, in which she placed second. She went on to release several charting albums and singles in Greece and Cyprus, also becoming a mentor on X Factor Georgia in 2014, 2015 and 2018, and The X Factor Greece in 2016 and 2017.

She represented Cyprus in the Eurovision Song Contest 2019 with the song "Replay", finishing in 13th place with 109 points.

== Early life ==
Tamta was born and raised in Georgia, where she started singing at the age of five. At the age of 14, Tamta married her 16 year-old boyfriend and gave birth to their daughter, Annie. While raising her daughter, she graduated from high school and attended Tbilisi State University.

Tamta divorced her husband after six years of marriage, and later immigrated to Greece with her daughter. Tamta's mother and younger brother had previously immigrated to Greece, where her mother found work as a housekeeper. In Greece, Tamta settled in Athens, but did not have a residence permit; she made money by assisting her mother as a housekeeper.

== Career ==
=== 2003–2006: Super Idol and beginnings ===
In 2003, while she was working as a housekeeper in Athens, one of the families Tamta worked for recommended her to audition for Super Idol, in order to receive a residence permit. She entered the talent show, and subsequently became a finalist. Tamta went on to place as the show's runner-up, behind winner Stavros Konstantinou. Following her appearance on Super Idol, Tamta was signed to Greek record label Minos EMI to begin a music career. Her first single "Eisai To Allo Mou Miso" featuring Stavros Konstantinou was released in 2004 and later Tamta began live appearances with Antonis Remos and Giorgos Dalaras.

In early 2006, Tamta released her debut studio album Tamta by label MINOS EMI. The same year, Tamta began live appearances with Thanos Petrelis, Katerina Stanisi and Apostolia Zoi in Apollonas. Also, she received the award for "Best New Artist" at the Mad Video Music Awards.

=== 2007–2009: Agapise me, soundtracks, and advertising campaign ===
In January 2007, Hellenic Radio and Television (ERT), announced Tamta's participation in the Greek national final for the Eurovision Song Contest 2007, competing with the song "With Love". Despite only placing third in the competition, "With Love" still went on to become a widely successful song in Greece, peaking at number two on the Greek singles chart. Her second studio album Agapise me was later released on 16 May 2007.

In June 2008, Tamta stated in an interview that she would like to represent Cyprus in the Eurovision Song Contest 2009. Rumours also stated that the Cyprus Broadcasting Corporation (CyBC) had been in contact with her since May of that year. In response, Greek media outlets also demanded that ERT choose Tamta to represent Greece in the Eurovision Song Contest 2009, following suspicions of favouritism from Eastern Bloc countries in the Eurovision Song Contest 2008 where Kalomira finished in third place. The rumours ultimately did not materialise and ERT chose Sakis Rouvas for the contest.

In early 2009, Tamta released the single "Koita me" to radios as the first single from her upcoming album.

=== 2010–2013: Tharros i alitheia and Rent ===
In March 2010 her third studio album "Tharros I Alitheia" was released. Also, Tamta released a single with the same name featuring Sakis Rouvas. The same year, she released two more singles, "Egoista" featuring Isaias Matiaba and "Fotia". For one season (2010-2011), Tamta played in the Greek version of the musical Rent.

In 2011, Tamta released two singles: "Zise To Apisteuto" and "Tonight" featuring Claydee & Playmen. The same year, she performed live in Thessaloniki with Sakis Rouvas and Eleni Foureira.

In 2012, she released two singles: "Niose Tin Kardia" and "Konta Sou".

2013 saw the release of two singles "S' Agapao" and "Pare Me". Also, during the 2013–2014 season, Tamta performed live in Teatro Music Hall Athens with Paola, Pantelis Pantelidis and Stan.

=== 2014–2019: The X Factor, Cabaret, attrattivo x Tamta, and Eurovision ===
In 2014, Tamta released the singles "Gennithika Gia Sena" featuring Xenia Ghali and "Den Eimai Oti Nomizeis". During season 2014, 2015 and 2018, she was a judge and mentor in X Factor Georgia. In 2015, Tamta released the single "Unloved" which was intended for the Greek participation in Eurovision Song Contest 2015. In 2016, Tamta released the single "To Kati Parapano". 2016 and 2017, she was a judge and mentor in The X Factor Greece.

Also, in 2017, she released the singles "Protimo", "Ilious Kai Thalasses" and "More Than A Summer Love" (English version of Ilious Kai Thalasses). During season 2017–2018, Tamta played the role of Sally Bowles in the Greek version of musical "Cabaret". In early 2018, Tamta appeared live in BOX Athens with Melisses, DJ Young, Konnie Metaxa & Animando. Later that year, she released the singles "Arxes Kalokairiou" with an English version "Tag You In My Sky" and the soundtrack of movie "The Bachelor", "Na Me Pareis Makria". In late 2018, Tamta released her first clothing collection with Atrattivo.

In December 2018, it was revealed that Tamta would represent Cyprus at the Eurovision Song Contest 2019 with the song "Replay". Tamta had previously been offered the chance to represent Cyprus at the Eurovision Song Contest 2018 with the song "Fuego", but declined the offer due to scheduling issues. Eleni Foureira went on to represent the country instead, placing second in the competition, Cyprus' best result of all-time. Both songs were written by Greek-Swedish songwriter Alex P. The music video was released on 5 March 2019. At Eurovision, Tamta achieved 13th place with 109 points.

After Eurovision, she released two songs: "Señorita" featuring Snik and "Sex With Your Ex". In the season 2019–20, she performed live with Melisses, Elena Tsagrinou and Matina Zara.

=== 2020-present: AWAKE ===
In 2020, Tamta released four songs with videoclips: "S' Agapo", directed by her and Paris Kassidokostas-Latsis, "Yala" featuring Stephane Legar, "Den Eisai Edo" featuring Mente Fuerte and "Hold On", directed by her and Paris Kassidokostas-Latsis too, during their holiday in Milos. On 3 July 2020, she released her debut English EP, "Awake".

== Personal life ==
From 2004 to 2010, Tamta was in a relationship with Grigoris Petrakos. Since early 2015, Tamta has been in a relationship with Paris Kassidokostas-Latsis. In 2022, she became a Greek citizen. Besides Greek and Georgian, Tamta speaks fluent English and Russian.

== Discography ==
- Tamta (2006)
- Agapise Me (2007)
- Tharros I Alitheia (2010)
- Best Of (2017)
- Awake (2020)
- Identity Crisis (2023)
- THE VILLAIN HEROINE (2025)

== Filmography ==
Television
Year	Title	Role	Notes
2003–2004	Super Idol	Herself	Season 1 - Contestant - 2nd place
2007	Greece in the Eurovision Song Contest 2007	Herself	Contestant - 3rd place
2010	I Polykatoikia	Singer	Season 3 - Guest Star
2011	MadWalk - The Fashion Music Project	Herself	Hostess with Vicky Kaya
2014, 2015, 2018	X Factor	Herself	Georgian edition - Season 1, 2, 5 - Judge/Mentor
2015	The Voice of Greece	Herself	Greek edition - Season 2 - Guest Star
2016, 2017	X Factor	Herself	Greek edition - Season 4, 5 - Judge/Mentor
2018	Project Runway	Herself	Greek edition - Season 1 - Guest Judge
2019	Eurovision Song Contest 2019	Herself	Cypriot entrant - 13th place
2019	X Factor	Herself	Greek edition - Season 6 - Guest Star
2020	Greece's Next Top Model	Herself	Season 5 - Guest Star
2020	The Voice of Greece	Herself	Greek edition - Season 7 - Guest Mentor
Theater
Year	Title	Role	Notes
2010–2011	Rent	Mimi	Sfentona Theater
2018	Cabaret	Sally Bowles	Pallas Theater
Film
Year	Title	Role	Notes
2006	Arthur and the Minimoys	Princess Selenia (voice)	Greek version of the movie
2019	Frozen II	Iduna (voice)	Greek version of the movie

Preceded by Eleni Foureira with "Fuego"	Cyprus in the Eurovision Song Contest; 2019	Succeeded by Sandro with "Running"
