= Stéphane Legar =

Togolese-Israeli singer

Stéphane Legar סטפן לגר
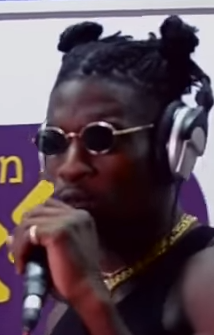
- Togolese-Israel singer Stéphane Legar in 2018

Background information
- Born: Stéphane Gagba; May 13, 1998 (age 28); Bat Yam, Israel
- Genres: Hip hop; pop
- Occupations: Singer; dancer; model
- Years active: 2016–present
- Labels: Unicell; Warner France

Stéphane Gagba (Hebrew: סטפן גאגבה; born May 13, 1998), better known professionally as Stéphane Legar (סטפן לגר), is a Togolese-Israeli singer, dancer, and model. His stage name is either Legar or Le Gar – short for Le Garçon, "the boy" in French. He is often simply referred to by his mononym Stéphane.

== Early life ==
Stéphane Gagba was born in Bat Yam, Israel, to Christian parents from Togo. His parents were foreign diplomats working in the Nigerian embassy in Israel at the time. He has an older sister. As a child, he spent most of his holidays visiting his relatives in Togo.

As a child, he was nominated for deportation from Israel – due to lacking citizenship – as he only had a resident status. Although, he was a citizen of Togo (Togolese passport). Until the age of 10, his parents protected him from this awareness. Eventually, he acquired an Israeli citizenship as well – then, he enrolled into IDF Israeli military service, on 3 May 2021.

At the age of 12, Legar moved with his family to Holon, Israel. He attended the youth village school Mikveh Israel, in its French sector. He enlisted in August 2017 to the Israel Defense Forces and served in a unit responsible for explaining the recruitment process to high schoolers.

== Career ==
At 14, he started as a model for the Castro clothing chain. After that, as an acclaimed dancer, he won the Israeli hip-hop dance championship twice. In 2016, he was cast to dance in a Static & Ben El Tavori clip.

In October 2016, he released his first hit song, Step Fun, which got millions of online views and trending dances from the song. In 2017, he made a song with Israeli singer Noa Kirel named "Tikitas"(טיקיטאס). Ever since then he has been one of the most successful hip-hop artists in Israel, and has fans from the whole world, especially in France and Israel.

On January 15, 2019, he collaborated with Static & Ben El Tavori, as well as Eden Ben Zaken, on the track "Yassu"(יאסו). The song features a Greek-inspired instrumental and music video concept. The track would end up being performed for "The Next Eurovision Star" program that same year, with each artist performing their part of the song, alongside an equally Greek-inspired stage and costume design.

In 2020, his song, "Comme ci, comme ça" won the international educational competition, "Manie Musicale."

== Personal life ==
His native language is French, but he is also fluent in Hebrew, Ewe, English, and Spanish.

== Discography ==
- 2016: "Step Fun"
- 2017: "Double Dutch", "Like That" (ft. Julieta), "Winner"
- 2018: "Comme Ci, Comme Ca"
- 2020: "Rak Banot" ll (ft. Itay Levi), "Vida Loca", "Favela", "תראי מה עשית" (Look What You Did)
- 2021: "Flexin", "Merci", "J'avance", "נעים מאוד" (Nice to Meet You)
- 2022: "Speed Life", "Chérie Coco", "קרקס" (Circus)
- 2023: "רק אני יודע" (Only I Know)
- 2024: "לפני, אחרי" (Before, After)

== Awards and nominations ==
Year	Awards	Category	Nominated work	Result
2017	MTV Europe Music Awards	Best Israeli Act	Himself	Nominated
2018	MTV Europe Music Awards	Best Israeli Act	Himself	Nominated
