= Evropesma =

Song contest in Serbia & Montenegro 2004 to 2006

- Also known as: Europjesma (Montenegrin)
- Genre: Song contest
- Country of origin: Serbia and Montenegro
- Original languages: Serbian, Montenegrin
- No. of episodes: 3 editions

Production
- Production locations: Belgrade, Serbia (2004, 2006); Podgorica, Montenegro (2005)
- Production companies: UJRT (RTS and RTCG)

Original release
- Release: 21 February 2004 – 11 March 2006

Related
- Beovizija and Montevizija (2005–2006); Eurovision Song Contest (1956–present)

Evropesma (Serbian Cyrillic: Европесма) or Europjesma (Montenegrin: Еуропјесма) was a pop song contest in Serbia and Montenegro which ran from 2004 to 2006. The winning song represented the country in the Eurovision Song Contest. It was organized by the Serbia and Montenegro union of broadcasters UJRT (consisting of RTS and RTCG).

In 2005 and 2006, Beovizija and Montevizija served as Serbia's and Montenegro's semi-finals for Evropesma (respectively). After the dissolution of the state union between Serbia and Montenegro, the semifinal contests took over the role of this festival.

== Voting process ==
RTCG argued that fairly anonymous representatives from Montenegro have little chance against a number of big music stars that generally take part on behalf of RTS, and who are usually famous in Montenegro itself. RTCG failed to engage any of the big Montenegro stars that could actually gain televotes to take part in Montevizija. Because of this, RTCG demanded that televoting should only be a part of the decision on who is going to win the competition. As a result, there are four judges appointed by RTCG, four by RTS and televoting was the ninth jury member. Points are allocated as follows: 1, 2, 3, 4, 5, 6, 7, 8, 10 or 12 (1, 2, 3, 4, 5, 6, 7, 8, 9 and 10 in 2004).

== Winners ==
Table key
2	Second place
X	Entry selected but did not compete

Year	Date	Venue	Song	Artist(s)	Language	Songwriter(s)	Result in the Eurovision Song Contest	
Year	Date	Venue	Song	Artist(s)	Language	Songwriter(s)	Place	Points
2004	21 February	Sava Centar, Belgrade, Serbia	"Lane Moje"	Željko Joksimović	Serbian	Željko Joksimović, Leontina Vukomanović	2nd	263
2005	4 March	RTCG Studios, Podgorica, Montenegro	"Zauvijek moja"	No Name	Montenegrin	Milan Perić, Slaven Knezović	7th	137
2006	11 March	Sava Centar, Belgrade, Serbia	"Moja ljubavi"	No Name	Montenegrin	Milan Perić, Dalibor Nedović	Withdrawn X	

== 2004 event and controversy ==
The first Evropesma, held on February 21, 2004, in Belgrade, Serbia, featured 24 performers, 19 from Serbia and only 5 from Montenegro. Four of the songs that represented RTS were selected in Beovizija 2004, which was in part a semifinal for Evropesma. The representatives for RTCG were selected internally, and the others were selected by UJRT. Željko Joksimović won the 2004 Evropesma with "Lane moje", going on to reach second place in the Eurovision Song Contest 2004 in Istanbul, Turkey. The members of the Serbian jury didn't give a single point to the songs that represented Montenegro and member of Montenegrin jury didn't give points to winner and the runner up of Beovizija, which caused some controversy.

Final - 21 February 2004
Draw	Sent by	Singer	Song	Place	1	2	3	4	5	6	7	8	9	Points
1	UJRT	Jovana Nikolić	Posle Tebe	10	1	3	2		6		2	7	2	23
2	UJRT	Teodora Bojović & Nightshift	Daj Mi Snage	6	4	8		5		8		8		33
3	RTCG	Evropa	Evropa	5	9		4		8		8		8	37
4	UJRT	Extra Nena	More Ljubavi	12		4		4	2			5		15
5	UJRT	Saša Vasić	Priznaj	15	8									8
6	UJRT	Jelena Tomašević	Kad Ne Bude Tvoje Ljubavi	11		6		7		5		2		20
7	UJRT	Slobodan Bajić	Možeš Da Me Ne Voliš	19			3				1			4
8	UJRT	Ana Milenković	Takva Žena	18		2		1		2		1		6
9	UJRT	Tanja Banjanin	Istina	22										0
10	RTS	Boris Režak	Zauvek	22										0
11	UJRT	Knez	Navika	17					3		4			7
12	RTCG	Negre	K'o Nijedna Druga	3	10		9		9		9		9	46
13	UJRT	Madam Piano	Igra	9		7		8		6		4		25
14	RTS	Negative	Zbunjena	4		10		9		10		9	6	44
15	UJRT	Tanja Jovićević	Uzmi Me	15	2		1	2		3				8
16	UJRT	Saša Dragaš	Dao Bih Sve	22										0
17	RTCG	Sergej Ćetković	Ne Mogu Da Ti Oprostim	8	5		5		5		5		7	27
18	UJRT	Željko Joksimović	Lane Moje	1	6	9	10	10	10	9	10	10	10	84
19	RTS	Leontina	Zamisli	12			8			4			3	15
20	UJRT	Peti Element	Reka Bez Povratka	2	3	5	6	6	4	7	6	6	4	47
21	RTS	Nataša Kojić	Moje Oko Plavo	21									1	1
22	UJRT	Mogul	Ne Trgujem Osećanjima	20								3		3
23	UJRT	Mari Mari	Kad Ponos Ubije Ljubav	14		1		3	1	1	3			9
24	RTCG	Andrijana Božović & Marija Božović	Nijedna Suza	6	7		7		7		7		5	33

== 2005 event and controversy ==
Europjesma 2005 was held on March 4, 2005, in Podgorica, Montenegro. Even before the contest started there were some controversies. RTCG said that RTS was favoring their entrants Ogi Radivojević and Jelena Tomašević, runner up and winner, respectively, of Beovizija 2005. Željko Joksimović, author of the song "Jutro" performed by Jelena Tomašević, even arranged a winning party for Jelena, before the show. RTCG judges voted by awarding few points to any of the Serbian performers, while giving the maximum points the band No Name (who also won the televote).

Before allowing "Zauvijek moja" to be confirmed as Serbia and Montenegro's entry, the EBU launched an investigation into a number of formal complaints, which also related to hotly disputed allegations of plagiarism. However, after prolonged deliberations, the song was given the green light.

There were rumors that the televote, which only lasted for 10 minutes, was free of charge in Montenegro and not in Serbia, but it was proven false.

Rank	Order	Song	Singer	1	2	3	4	5	6	7	8	Televoting	9	Total
1	2	Zauvijek moja	No Name	6	12	6	12	5	12	7	12	32607	12	84
2	9	Jutro	Jelena Tomašević	12		12		10		10		16978	10	54
3	4	Hajde Cico	Ogi	10		10		12		12		4187	7	51
4	24	Utjeha	Stevan Faddy		10		10		10	5	7	4283	8	50
5	5	Šta će mi dani	Andrea Demirović		8	4	8		8		10	1784	4	42
6	15	Sve ti boje dobro stoje	Andrijana Božović		5	8	6	1	7		5	1466	3	35
6	20	Govor tijela	Marko Vukčević	8	3		2	6		8	8			35
8	18	Nama treba ljubav	Maja Mitrović	7		2	7	8		6				30
9	17	Svejedno	Bojan Marović	4	4	1	5		5	4		3079	6	29
10	7	Nevidljiva	Ana Cvetković	1	6	7		4	4		2	748	1	25
11	22	Pronađi put	Marija Božović	3	7		4	2	3		4			23
12	23	Nebo	Dušan Zrnić	5				7		2	1			15
13	12	U oku tvom	Ivana Popović		1						6	2066	5	12
14	6	Ti si kriv	Teodora Bojović			3		3	2	1				9
15	3	Pobedila si me	Džej i Maja			5						898	2	7
16	13	Minđuša	Koktel Bend							3	3			6
16	8	Praznina	Svetlana Raičković						6					6
18	19	Ponuda	Marija Šerifović		2		3							5
19	10	Kada ljubav umire	Biljana Mitrović				1		1					2
19	1	Bolje da te nemam	Lu Lu	2										2
21	14	Kaži sestro	Viktorija											0
21	16	Ko je kriv	Tatjana Đorđević											0
21	21	Dobre devojke	Taša											0

In the table above, shaded columns correspond to jurors from Montenegro and italicized rows correspond to songs from Serbia. Serbian band Luna initially planned to compete in the final, but the band withdrew just before the event started due to boycott. They were allocated to perform 11th with the song "Sentimientos".

== 2006 event and controversy ==
2006 Evropesma, held in Belgrade, Serbia, on March 11, 2006, saw the same voting pattern from the judges from both republics: this year's favorites, once again winners and the runner up of Beovizija 2006, Flamingosi (Serbian-Montenegrin duo) feat. Louis and Ana Nikolić, respectively, received no points from the RTCG judges. The judges appointed by RTS in turn awarded eight points to No Name and four points to Stevan Faddy, enough for No Name to score another win. The Beovizija favorites Flamingosi finished second. The televote placed Beovizija favorites first and second and No Name third.

The stir began during the voting, as the audience started leaving the event in the midst of it, after realizing that their favourites were not going to win. The remaining audience booed No Name off the stage, and threw objects (such as bottles) at the stage, as they came out to accept the award and perform their song again, in the Eurovision Song Contest tradition. The audience then wooed Flamingosi on stage and they performed their song with the other finalists from Beovizija present on stage.

As a result, the Executive Board of UJRT did not accept the victory of No Name, stating that voting violated the merits of the competition, albeit not being found irregular. Source: UJRT statement

The Director General of the RTS and the head of UJRT, Aleksandar Tijanić, wrote a letter to his counterpart at the RTCG, Radovan Miljanić, suggesting that a new contest be held, featuring five songs from both semi-finals that got the most points. The winner would be selected solely through televoting. At the same time, RTCG requested from the European Broadcasting Union that they intervene in accepting the voting results from the controversial contest. The European Broadcasting Union responded on March 18, 2006, two days before the deadline for the submission of the national entry to the Eurovision Song Contest 2006, by suggesting that the broadcasters find a solution on their own. This was to no avail, and finally, on March 20, 2006, Serbia and Montenegro officially withdrew from the 2006 Eurovision Song Contest. As the UJRT broadcast the semifinal and final, the viewers were able to vote.

As the withdrawal left an empty slot in the final, Croatia and their representative Severina took it. The Eurovision Song Contest 2005 Croatian representative Boris Novković won 11th place, one place below the cutoff for the direct entry into the final.

Points awarded at Evropesma 2006
Rank	Order	Song	Singer	1	2	3	4	5	6	7	8	Televoting	9	Total
1	15	Moja ljubavi	No Name	12	3	12	5	12		12		3475	8	64
2	14	Ludi letnji ples	Flamingosi feat. Louis		12		12		12		12	11928	12	60
3	9	Cipele	Stevan Faddy	10		10	4	10		10		1583	6	50
4	17	Za nju	Stefan Filipović	7	5	6	3	8	5	7	5	561	4	50
5	22	Romale romali	Ana Nikolić		8		10		10		8	3981	10	46
6	8	Lazarica	Ivana Jordan	1	10		8	2	8		6	2007	7	42
7	19	Sudbina	Bojan Delić	8		8		5		6		405	1	28
8	24	Greh	Tijana Dapčević		4		1		7		10	687	5	27
9	7	Feniks	Nela Popović	6		7		7		3	2			25
10	4	Da ti se dlanovi zalede	Mari Mari	5	6				3		7			21
11	5	Anđeo u očima	Crveno i crno			5		3		8				16
12	20	Kapija	Biber		2		2	4	4		1			13
13	18	Kad ti treba	Maja Nikolić						6	1	4			11
14	1	Koraci	Dan poslije	2	7			1						10
15	13	Željna	Vladana & Bojana	4		1				5				10
16	23	Uspavanka	Grim			3	7							10
17	21	Naći ću te	Jelena Kažanegra				6			4				10
18	12	Konak	Ana Bekuta						2		3	419	3	8
19	3	Živa sam	Milena Vučić					6						6
20	2	Kap po kap	Romana	3	1				1					5
21	11	Putujem sama	Krug			4								4
22	16	Jednom pokidano	Blizanci									412	2	2
23	6	Maler	Blah, blah bend			2								2
23	10	Poruka za ljubav	Ivana Knežević							2				2

In this table, red color denotes songs and jurors from Montenegro, blue those from Serbia.

== Broadcasts ==
All three editions of the festival were broadcast on RTS1 in Serbia and on TVCG 1 in Montenegro, as well as on RTS and RTCG's respective international channels, RTS Sat (currently RTS Svet) and TVCG Sat (currently TVCG MNE).

== See also ==
- Serbia and Montenegro in the Eurovision Song Contest
