= Serbia and Montenegro in the Eurovision Song Contest 2006 =

- Eurovision Song Contest 2006
- Participating broadcaster: Udruženje javnih radija i televizija (UJRT)
- Country: Serbia and Montenegro
- Selection process: Evropesma-Europjesma 2006
- Selection date: 11 March 2006

Placement
- Final result: Withdrawn

Participation chronology

Serbia and Montenegro was set to be represented at the Eurovision Song Contest 2006. The Serbian-Montenegrin participant broadcaster, Udruženje javnih radija i televizija (UJRT), organised the national final Evropesma-Europjesma 2006 in order to select its entry for the contest. Serbian Radio-televizija Srbije (RTS) and Montenegrin Radio-televizija Crne Gore (RTCG) each submitted twelve entries from their respective selections Beovizija 2006 and Montevizija 2006 with twenty-four entries in total competing in the national final on 11 March 2006. The song "Moja ljubavi", written by Milan Perić and Dalibor Nedović, and performed by the band No Name (which had represented Serbia and Montenegro in 2005), won the national final following the combination of votes from an eight-member jury panel and a public televote. However, the results were not recognized by UJRT due to controversy surrounding supposed tactical voting of the Montenegrin jury, and the broadcaster ended up not submitting any entry.

As one of ten highest placed finishers in the 2005 contest Serbia and Montenegro directly qualified to compete in the final of the Eurovision Song Contest which took place on 20 May 2006. However, Serbia and Montenegro was removed from the contest on 20 March due to UJRT not being able to submit an entry by the submission deadline with the empty slot in the final being replaced by Croatia.

== Background ==
Prior to the 2006 Contest, Udruženje javnih radija i televizija (UJRT) had participated in the Eurovision Song Contest representing Serbia and Montenegro as an independent country two times since its first entry in 2004 when it achieved its best placing with the song "Lane moje" performed by Željko Joksimović, placing second in the final. In 2005, "Zauvijek moja" performed by No Name, placed seventh in the final. Up to this point, Serbia and Montenegro had featured in every final of the Eurovision Song Contest they participated in.

As part of its duties as participating broadcaster, UJRT organised the selection of its entry in the Eurovision Song Contest while Serbian Radio-televizija Srbije (RTS) and Montenegrin Radio-televizija Crne Gore (RTCG) broadcast the event within their respective republics. UJRT confirmed its intentions to participate at the 2006 contest on 23 November 2005. In 2004 and 2005, the Evropesma-Europjesma national final had been used in order to select its entry, a procedure that continued for the selection of the 2006 entry as announced along with its participation confirmation.

== Before Eurovision ==
=== Montevizija 2006 ===
RTCG organised Montevizija 2006, the second edition of Montevizija, in order to select its entries for the national final. The broadcaster held the competition on 24 February 2006 at its studios in Podgorica, hosted by Zoja-Spahić Kustudić, Andrija Milošević, Danilo Čelebić, Irena Ivanović, and Milena Ristić. Twenty songs competed and nine juries – 8 jury members and a public televote determined the twelve songs to progress to the final of Evropesma-Europjesma 2006.

Montevizija 2006 – 24 February 2006
R/O	Artist	Song	Jury	Televote	Total	Place
1	Jelena Kažanegra	"Naći ću te" (Наћи ћу те)	16	0	16	12
2	Dan poslije	"Koraci" (Кораци)	31	1	32	6
3	Bojan Delić	"Sudbina" (Судбина)	22	8	30	7
4	Grim	"Uspavanka" (Успаванка)	20	0	20	10
5	Vladana and Bojana	"Željna" (Жељна)	16	0	16	11
6	Saša Barjaktarović	"Budi svoj" (Буди свој)	5	0	5	16
7	Krug	"Putujem sama" (Путујем сама)	22	0	22	9
8	Stevan Faddy	"Cipele" (Ципеле)	94	10	104	1
9	Nina Žižić	"Potraži me" (Потражи ме)	4	0	4	17
10	Dado Đurović	"Ne postojim" (Не постојим)	4	4	8	15
11	Milena Vučić	"Živa sam" (Жива сам)	23	0	23	8
12	Katapult	"Kad ljubav pobijedi" (Кад љубав побиједи)	1	3	4	17
13	Milica Milić	"Ti si mi za sve" (Ти си ми за све)	6	7	13	13
14	Danica Krsmanović	"Žubor vina" (Жубор вина)	6	6	12	14
15	Stefan Filipović	"Za nju" (За њу)	47	5	52	3
16	Nela Popović	"Kao feniks" (Као феникс)	39	0	39	4
17	Crveno i crno	"Anđeo u očima" (Анђео у очима)	37	0	37	5
18	No Name	"Moja ljubavi" (Моја љубави)	69	12	81	2
19	Marija Brajović	"Ti nisi taj" (Ти ниси тај)	1	0	1	20
20	Nikola Karadžić	"Hasta la vista"	1	2	3	19

=== Beovizija 2006 ===
RTS organised Beovizija 2006, the 4th edition of Beovizija, in order to select its entries for the national final. The broadcaster held the competition on 10 March 2006 in Sava Centar in Belgrade. 23 songs competed in Beovizija 2006, one song, "Blizina", due to be performed by Zvezde Granda and Šaban Bajramović was withdrawn due to Bajramović's poor health condition. Nine juries – 8 jury members and a public televote determined the twelve songs to progress to the final of Evropesma-Europjesma 2006.

Beovizija 2006 – 10 march 2006
R/O	Artist	Song	Jury	Televote		Total	Place
R/O	Artist	Song	Jury	Votes	Points	Total	Place
1	Dejan Vozlić	"Nisam kriv" (Нисам крив)	11	—	0	11	13
2	Biber	"Kapija" (Капија)	34	—	0	34	6
3	Enes Ukić	"Osvoji me" (Освоји ме)	4	875	6	10	14
4	Koktel bend	"Vatrena" (Ватрена)	2	—	0	2	19
5	Ivana Selakov	"Izabran" (Изабран)	3	—	0	3	18
6	Julija i Julija	"Iskrena pesma" (Искрена песма)	0	—	0	0	22
7	Ivana Knežević	"Poruka za ljubav" (Порука за љубав)	15	—	0	15	10
8	Blah Blah Band	"Maler" (Малер)	18	297	2	20	7
9	Blizanci	"Jednom pokidano" (Једном покидано)	9	367	4	13	11
10	Nevena	"Ništa o njoj" (Ништа о њој)	5	—	0	5	16
11	Maja Nikolić	"Kada ti treba" (Када ти треба)	17	256	1	18	9
12	Marko Jeftić	"Sve ili ništa" (Све или ништа)	0	—	0	0	22
13	Vanja Radovanović	"Kad me jednom za te ne bude" (Кад ме једном за те не буде)	1	—	0	1	21
14	Želimir Petrović	"Otrezni me" (Отрезни ме)	2	—	0	2	19
15	Slađa Ivanišević	"Neopisivo" (Неописиво)	5	—	0	5	16
16	Tijana Dapčević	"Greh" (Грех)	54	1,468	7	61	4
17	Ana Bekuta	"Konak" (Конак)	8	631	5	13	11
18	Ana Nikolić	"Romale romali" (Ромале ромали)	67	3,086	10	77	2
19	Ivana Jordan	"Lazarica" (Лазарица)	55	2,552	8	63	3
20	Mari Mari	"Da ti se dlanovi zalede" (Да ти се дланови заледе)	46	317	3	49	5
21	Flamingosi feat. Louis	"Ludi letnji ples" (Луди летњи плес)	82	10,128	12	94	1
22	Romana	"Kap po kap" (Кап по кап)	19	—	0	19	8
23	Propaganda 117	"Bajka" (Бајка)	7	—	0	7	15

=== Evropesma-Europjesma 2006 ===
UJRT organised Evropesma-Europjesma 2006 in order to select its entry for the Eurovision Song Contest 2006. The competition took place at the Sava Centar in Belgrade on 11 March 2006, hosted by Jelena Jovičić and Boda Ninković. The show was broadcast in Serbia on RTS1 and RTS Sat as well as streamed online via the broadcaster's website rts.co.yu, and in Montenegro on TVCG 1 and TVCG Sat.

==== Competing entries ====
Both UJRT broadcasters, Serbian RTS and Montenegrin RTCG, each conducted separate selections in order to select the twenty-four entries to proceed to the national final: RTS organised Beovizija 2006 on 10 March 2006 where twenty-three songs competed, while RTCG organised Montevizija 2006 on 24 February 2006 with twenty entries competing. From each selection, the top twelve entries qualified for the national final and among the competing artists was No Name which represented Serbia and Montenegro in 2005.

Artist	Song	Songwriter(s)	Broadcaster
Ana Bekuta	"Konak" (Конак)	Saša Milošević Mare, Zoran Marjanović	RTS
Ana Nikolić	"Romale romali" (Ромале ромали)	Ljiljana Jorgovanović, Zoran Lesendrić	RTS
Biber	"Kapija" (Капија)	Đorđe Radivojević, Rastko Aksentijević	RTS
Blah Blah Band	"Maler" (Малер)	Lidija Rosić, Bojan Vasić	RTS
Blizanci	"Jednom pokidano" (Једном покидано)	Nenad Jovanović, Аleksandar Perisić	RTS
Bojan Delić	"Sudbina" (Судбина)	Dejan Perišić	RTCG
Crveno i crno	"Anđeo u očima" (Анђео у очима)	Vesna Milačić, Miha Radonjić	RTCG
Flamingosi feat. Louis	"Ludi letnji ples" (Луди летњи плес)	Goran Stanković, Ognjen Amidžić	RTS
Grim	"Uspavanka" (Успаванка)	Nebojša Đukanović	RTCG
Ivana Jordan	"Lazarica" (Лазарица)	Ivana Jordan	RTS
Ivana Knežević	"Poruka za ljubav" (Порука за љубав)	Svetlana Slavković, Aleksandar Kobac	RTS
Jelena Kažanegra	"Naći ću te" (Наћи ћу те)	Nikola Radunović	RTCG
Krug	"Putujem sama" (Путујем сама)	Dražen Miljanović	RTCG
Maja Nikolić	"Kad ti treba" (Кад ти треба)	Leontina Vukomanović, Saša Milošević Mare	RTS
Mari Mari	"Da ti se dlanovi zalede" (Да ти се дланови заледе)	Aleksandra Milutinović, Ljiljana Jorgovanović	RTS
Milena Vučić	"Živa sam" (Жива сам)	Vesna Milačić, Miha Radonjić	RTCG
Nela Popović	"Feniks" (Феникс)	Momčilo Zeković	RTCG
Nina and Dan poslije	"Koraci" (Кораци)	Nina Petković, Zoran Radonjić	RTCG
No Name	"Moja ljubavi" (Моја љубави)	Milan Perić, Dalibor Nedović	RTCG
Romana	"Kap po kap" (Кап по кап)	Saša Milošević Mare, Ljiljana Jorgovanović, Goran Stanković	RTS
Stefan Filipović	"Za nju" (За њу)	Sergej Ćetković	RTCG
Stevan Faddy	"Cipele" (Ципеле)	Jelena Galonić, Aleksandar Filipović	RTCG
Tijana Dapčević	"Greh" (Грех)	Dragan Brajović	RTS
Vladana and Bojana	"Željna" (Жељна)	Svetlana Raičković	RTCG

==== Final ====
The final took place on 11 March 2006 where twenty-four songs competed. The winner, "Moja ljubavi" performed by No Name, was decided by a combination of votes from a jury panel and the Serbian and Montenegrin public via televoting. The Serbian jury consisted of Milan Đurđević (musician), Zoran Dašić (RTS music editor and composer), Jovan Maljoković (composer and jazz musician) and Tanja Banjanin (singer), while the Montenegrin jury consisted of Predrag Kalezić (producer), Milica Belević (editor and music critic), Bojan Bajramović (President of the Association of Pop Artists and Performers of Montenegro), Predrag Janković (professor at the University of Montenegro Music Academy), and televoters as the ninth jury member that it was presented by Duška Vučinić (Serbian Eurovision Song Contest commentator). Eurovision contestants Hari Mata Hari, Severina, Brian Kennedy, Elena Risteska, and Anžej Dežan, which would represent Bosnia and Herzegovina, Croatia, Ireland, Macedonia, and Slovenia in the 2006 contest, respectively, were featured as guest performers during the show.

Evropesma-Europjesma 2006 – 11 March 2006
R/O	Artist	Song	Jury	Televote		Total	Place
R/O	Artist	Song	Jury	Votes	Points	Total	Place
1	Nina and Dan poslije	"Koraci"	10	—	0	10	14
2	Romana	"Kap po kap"	5	—	0	5	20
3	Milena Vučić	"Živa sam"	6	—	0	6	19
4	Mari Mari	"Da ti se dlanovi zalede"	21	—	0	21	10
5	Crveno i crno	"Anđeo u očima"	16	—	0	16	11
6	Blah Blah Band	"Maler"	2	—	0	2	23
7	Nela Popović	"Feniks"	25	—	0	25	9
8	Ivana Jordan	"Lazarica"	35	2,007	7	42	6
9	Stevan Faddy	"Cipele"	44	1,583	6	50	3
10	Ivana Knežević	"Poruka za ljubav"	2	—	0	2	24
11	Krug	"Putujem sama"	4	—	0	4	21
12	Ana Bekuta	"Konak"	5	419	3	8	18
13	Vladana and Bojana	"Željna"	10	—	0	10	15
14	Flamingosi feat. Louis	"Ludi letnji ples"	48	11,928	12	60	2
15	No Name	"Moja ljubavi"	56	3,475	8	64	1
16	Blizanci	"Jednom pokidano"	0	412	2	2	22
17	Stefan Filipović	"Za nju"	46	561	4	50	4
18	Maja Nikolić	"Kad ti treba"	11	—	0	11	13
19	Bojan Delić	"Sudbina"	27	405	1	28	7
20	Biber	"Kapija"	13	—	0	13	12
21	Jelena Kažanegra	"Naći ću te"	10	—	0	10	17
22	Ana Nikolić	"Romale romali"	36	3,981	10	46	5
23	Grim	"Uspavanka"	10	—	0	10	16
24	Tijana Dapčević	"Greh"	22	687	5	27	8

Detailed Jury Votes
R/O	Song	RTS				RTCG				Total
R/O	Song	M. Đurđević	Z. Dašić	J. Maljoković	T. Banjanin	P. Kalezić	M. Belević	B. Bajramović	P. Janković	Total
1	"Koraci"	7				2		1		10
2	"Kap po kap"	1		1		3				5
3	"Živa sam"							6		6
4	"Da ti se dlanovi zalede"	6		3	7	5				21
5	"Anđeo u očima"						5	3	8	16
6	"Maler"						2			2
7	"Feniks"				2	6	7	7	3	25
8	"Lazarica"	10	8	8	6	1		2		35
9	"Cipele"		4			10	10	10	10	44
10	"Poruka za ljubav"								2	2
11	"Putujem sama"						4			4
12	"Konak"			2	3					5
13	"Željna"					4	1		5	10
14	"Ludi letnji ples"	12	12	12	12					48
15	"Moja ljubavi"	3	5			12	12	12	12	56
16	"Jednom pokidano"									0
17	"Za nju"	5	3	5	5	7	6	8	7	46
18	"Kad ti treba"			6	4				1	11
19	"Sudbina"					8	8	5	6	27
20	"Kapija"	2	2	4	1			4		13
21	"Naći ću te"		6						4	10
22	"Romale romali"	8	10	10	8					36
23	"Uspavanka"		7				3			10
24	"Greh"	4	1	7	10					22

=== Controversy and subsequent withdrawal ===
Evropesma-Europjesma 2006 saw the same voting pattern from the jurors from both republics as in 2005. Despite the public vote winners, Serbian Beovizija 2006 winner Flamingosi featuring Louis receiving over 7,000 votes more than the runner-up, Beovizija 2006 runner-up Ana Nikolić, both of them did not receive any points from the Montenegrin jurors whereas No Name, which placed third in the public vote, were awarded eight points by the Serbian jurors (which awarded the Montenegrin acts about 1/4 of their votes) making it enough for them to score another win as all four Montenegrin jurors (which awarded the Serbian acts about 1/10 of their votes) awarded them maximum points. Realizing that the favourites were not going to win, the audience started leaving the event with the remaining audience booing No Name off the stage and throwing objects (such as bottles) at the stage during the reprise. The audience then wooed Flamingosi and Louis on stage as they performed their song with the other Serbian acts present on stage.

Shortly after the competition, RTS held a press conference where it was announced that the two Serbian jurors that awarded No Name points, Milan Đurđević and Zoran Dašić, had withdrawn their votes in dispute of the supposed tactical voting of the Montenegrin jury. The executive board of UJRT later issued a statement stating that they did not accept the victory of No Name as the voting "violated the merits of the competition", albeit not being found irregular. Following failed negotiations of a new national final featuring the top five entries of Beovizija 2006 and Montevizija 2006 with the winner selected entirely by public televoting, both RTS and RTCG requested from the European Broadcasting Union (EBU) to intervene in accepting or annulling the competition results, but the EBU responded on 18 March by suggesting that the broadcasters find a solution on their own.

On 20 March, the deadline for entry submissions to the Eurovision Song Contest 2006, the EBU announced that Serbia and Montenegro would be removed from the contest due to UJRT failing to submit an entry in time. However, RTS, the Serbian member of UJRT, would still broadcast the semi-final and final, and only viewers in Serbia would be able to vote.

== At Eurovision ==
According to Eurovision rules, all nations with the exceptions of the host country, the "Big Four" (France, Germany, Spain, and the United Kingdom) and the ten highest placed finishers in the 2005 contest are required to qualify from the semi-final in order to compete for the final; the top ten countries from the semi-final progress to the final. As Serbia and Montenegro finished seventh in the 2005 contest, the nation automatically qualified to compete in the final on 20 May 2006. However, following its withdrawal from the contest on 20 March an empty slot for automatic qualification was left in the final, which was given to Croatia as they finished eleventh in 2005.

The semi-final and the final were broadcast in Serbia on RTS1 and RTS Sat with commentary by Duška Vučinić-Lučić. UJRT appointed Jovana Janković as its spokesperson to announce the Serbian (Note: Only Serbia was allowed to vote.) votes during the final. During the presentation of the points, Janković pointed that the country would return to the contest the following year with a song that will be "the best"; Serbia debuted in 2007 as an independent country, winning the contest with its entry "Molitva" performed by Marija Šerifović, and Janković would later host the Eurovision Song Contest 2008 in Belgrade alongside Željko Joksimović.

=== Voting ===
Below is a breakdown of points awarded by Serbia and Montenegro in the semi-final and grand final of the contest. The nation awarded its 12 points to Bosnia and Herzegovina in the semi-final and the final of the contest.

==== Points awarded by Serbia and Montenegro ====
Points awarded by Serbia and Montenegro (Semi-final)
Score	Country
12 points	Bosnia and Herzegovina
10 points	Macedonia
8 points	Finland
7 points	Slovenia
6 points	Russia
5 points	Ukraine
4 points	Sweden
3 points	Lithuania
2 points	Iceland
1 point	Ireland

Points awarded by Serbia and Montenegro (Final)
Score	Country
12 points	Bosnia and Herzegovina
10 points	Croatia
8 points	Macedonia
7 points	Finland
6 points	Greece
5 points	Russia
4 points	Romania
3 points	Lithuania
2 points	Ukraine
1 point	Sweden

== After Eurovision ==
On 21 May 2006, one day after the final of the Eurovision Song Contest 2006, an independence referendum was held in Montenegro, where the majority of its population voted for independence. Montenegro formally declared its independence on 3 June 2006, and two days later, the State Union of Serbia and Montenegro officially ceased to exist. Both countries participated in the Eurovision Song Contest 2007 separately as independent nations, with Serbia winning the contest and Montenegro failing to qualify to the final until 2014.
