= Serbia and Montenegro in the Eurovision Song Contest 2005 =

- Eurovision Song Contest 2005
- Participating broadcaster: Udruženje javnih radija i televizija (UJRT)
- Country: Serbia and Montenegro
- Selection process: Evropesma-Europjesma 2005
- Selection date: 4 March 2005

Competing entry
- Song: "Zauvijek moja"
- Artist: No Name
- Songwriters: Milan Perić; Slaven Knezović

Placement
- Final result: 7th, 137 points

Participation chronology

Serbia and Montenegro was represented at the Eurovision Song Contest 2005 with the song "Zauvijek moja", composed by Slaven Knezović, with lyrics by written by Milan Perić, and performed by the band No Name. The Serbian-Montenegrin participant broadcaster, Udruženje javnih radija i televizija (UJRT), organised the national final Evropesma-Europjesma 2005 in order to select its entry for the contest. Serbian Radio-televizija Srbije (RTS) and Montenegrin Radio-televizija Crne Gore (RTCG) each submitted twelve entries from their respective selections Beovizija 2005 and Montevizija 2005 with twenty-four entries in total competing in the national final on 4 March 2005. "Zauvijek moja" performed by No Name was selected as the winner following the combination of votes from an eight-member jury panel and a public televote.

As one of ten highest placed finishers in the 2004 contest Serbia and Montenegro directly qualified to compete in the final of the Eurovision Song Contest which took place on 21 May 2005. Performing in position 12, Serbia and Montenegro placed seventh out of the 24 participating countries with 137 points.

== Background ==
Prior to the 2005 contest, Udruženje javnih radija i televizija (UJRT) had participated in the Eurovision Song Contest representing Serbia and Montenegro as an independent country one time. Its only entry, "Lane moje" performed by Željko Joksimović, placed second.

As part of its duties as participating broadcaster, UJRT organised the selection of its entry in the Eurovision Song Contest while Serbian Radio-televizija Srbije (RTS) and Montenegrin Radio-televizija Crne Gore (RTCG) broadcast the event within their respective republics. UJRT confirmed its intentions to participate at the 2005 contest on 14 November 2004. The Evropesma-Europjesma national final had been used in 2004 in order to select its entry, a procedure that continued for the selection of the 2005 entry as announced along with its participation confirmation.

== Before Eurovision ==
=== Beovizija 2005 ===
RTS organised the 3rd edition of Beovizija in order to select its entries for the national final. Jelena Tomašević won Beovizija 2005 with the song "Jutro", written by Željko Joksimović and Aleksandra Milutinović. She received 78 points from the jury and the maximum 12 points by SMS and televoting. The hosts were actors Slobodan Ninković and Jelena Jovičić, who sang many former Eurovision Song Contest hits as a tribute to 50th anniversary of the event.

Beovizija 2005 – 19 February 2005
R/O	Artist	Song	Jury	Televote	Total	Place
1	Maja Mitrović	"Nama treba ljubav" (Нама треба љубав)	13	3	16	11
2	Dušan Zrnić	"Nebo" (Небо)	13	4	17	10
3	Epilog	"Oproštaj" (Опроштај)	1	0	1	18
4	Tatjana Đorđević	"Ko je kriv" (Ко је крив)	9	0	9	14
5	Lu Lu	"Bolje da te nemam" (Боље да те немам)	14	0	14	12
6	Momčilo Klinika	"Marija" (Марија)	2	0	2	17
7	Koktel bend	"Minđuša" (Минђуша)	24	2	26	9
8	Ana Cvetković	"Nevidljiva" (Невидљива)	60	7	67	3
9	Urban puls	"Ti znaš" (Ти знаш)	7	0	7	15
10	Boban	"Šta mi vredi" (Шта ми вреди)	0	0	0	21
11	Luna	"Sentimientos"	11	0	11	13
12	Marija Šerifović	"Ponuda" (Понуда)	33	0	33	7
13	Nataša Kojić – Taša	"Dobre devojke" (Добре девојке)	24	6	30	8
14	Draft	"Dodir" (Додир)	1	0	1	18
15	Trik FX	"Robija" (Робија)	0	1	1	18
16	Jelena Tomašević	"Jutro" (Јутро)	78	12	90	1
17	Astra	"Potraži me" (Потражи ме)	0	0	0	21
18	Ziki	"Čovek kao ja" (Човек као ја)	4	0	4	16
19	Džej and Maja	"Pobedila si me" (Победила си ме)	38	10	48	4
20	Ogi	"Hajde Cico" (Хајде Цицо)	61	8	69	2
21	Čipi	"Ljubav–vest dana" (Љубав–вест дана)	0	0	0	21
22	Viktorija	"Kaži sestro" (Кажи сестро)	37	0	37	6
23	Teodora Bojović	"Ti si kriv" (Ти си крив)	34	5	39	5

=== Montevizija 2005 ===
RTCG organised the first edition of Montevizija in order to select its entries for the national final. Montevizija 2005 was held on 2 March in Podgorica hosted by Andrija Milošević, Žana Gardašević, and Anđela Nenadović. Twenty-four songs competed and nine juries – 8 jury members and a public televote determined the ten songs to progress to the final of Evropjesma.

Montevizija 2005 – 2 March 2005
R/O	Artist	Song	Jury	Televote	Total	Place
1	Nina Petković	"Ljubav je" (Љубав је)	11	3	14	11
2	Slobodan Kovačević	"Јој" (Јој)	0	0	0	20
3	Duka Martinović	"Nisam tvoj" (Нисам твој)	0	0	0	20
4	Mićo Vujović	"Naopačke" (Наопачке)	0	0	0	20
5	No Name	"Zauvijek moja" (Заувијек моја)	85	12	97	1
6	Bojan Marović	"Svejedno" (Свеједно)	59	6	65	4
7	Bojan Delić	"Dan i noć" (Дан и ноћ)	0	4	4	15
8	Stevan Faddy	"Utjeha" (Утјеха)	68	10	78	2
9	Svetlana Raičković	"Praznina" (Празнина)	30	0	30	8
10	Suzana Tot	"Ljubav ja i ti" (Љубав ја и ти)	6	0	6	14
11	Vladana Vučinić	"Samo moj nikad njen" (Само мој никад њен)	1	0	1	18
12	Goran Pejović Gula	"Ja sakrivam sebe u sebi" (Ја сакривам себе у себи)	0	1	1	18
13	Makadam	"Talija" (Талија)	9	2	11	12
14	Marko Vukčević	"Govor tijela" (Говор тијела)	15	0	15	10
15	Еma Čivović	"Ove noći kad bi me zvao" (Ове ноћи кад би ме звао)	2	0	2	16
16	Biljana Mitrović	"Kad ljubav umire" (Када љубав умире)	31	0	31	7
17	Slaven Knezović	"Plaćam te životom ljepoto" (Плаћам те животом љепото)	8	0	8	13
18	Andrijana Božović	"Sve ti boje dobro stoje" (Све ти боје добро стоје)	65	5	70	3
19	Ivana Popović	"U oku tvom" (У оку твом)	10	8	18	9
20	Marija Božović	"Pronađi put" (Пронађи пут)	34	0	34	6
21	Andrea Demirović	"Šta će mi dani" (Шта ће ми дани)	28	7	35	5
22	Nebojša Đukanović	"Začaran" (Зачаран)	2	0	2	16
23	Božidarka Nikčević	"Nema te" (Нема те)	0	0	0	20
24	Kаја and Crveno i crno	"Nisam ti jedina" (Нисам ти једина)	0	0	0	20

=== Evropesma-Europjesma 2005 ===
Evropesma-Europjesma 2005 was the national final organised by UJRT in order to select the Serbian–Monetengrin entry for the Eurovision Song Contest 2005. The competition took place at the RTCG studios in Podgorica on 4 March 2005, hosted by Andela Nenadović, Žana Gardašević and Andrija Milošević. The show was broadcast in Serbia on RTS 1 and RTS Sat as well as streamed online via the broadcaster's website rts.co.yu, and in Montenegro on TVCG 1 and TVCG Sat.

==== Competing entries ====
Serbian RTS and Montenegrin RTCG, each conducted separate selections in order to select the twenty-four entries to proceed to the national final: RTS organised Beovizija 2005 on 19 February 2005 where twenty-three songs competed, while RTCG organised Montevizija 2005 on 2 March 2005 with twenty-four entries competing. The top fourteen entries from Beovizija 2005 and the top ten entries from Montevizija 2005 qualified for the national final. Shortly before the competition, "Sentimientos" performed by Luna, which was allocated to perform eleventh during the show, was withdrawn due to boycott.

Artist	Song	Songwriter(s)	Broadcaster
Ana Cvetković	"Nevidljiva" (Невидљива)	Ruža Jeremić, Dragana Jovanović	RTS
Andrea Demirović	"Šta će mi dani" (Шта ће ми дани)	Andrea Demirović	RTCG
Andrijana Božović	"Sve ti boje dobro stoje" (Све ти боје добро стоје)	Rastko Aksentijević	RTCG
Biljana Mitrović	"Kad ljubav umire" (Када љубав умире)	Biljana Mitrović, Nebojša Đukanović, Mirko Šćepanović	RTCG
Bojan Marović	"Svejedno" (Свеједно)	Leontina Vukomanović	RTCG
Dušan Zrnić	"Nebo" (Небо)	Danir Demirovski, Dušan Zrnić	RTS
Džej and Maja	"Pobedila si me" (Победила си ме)	Maja Miloš, Zoran Lesendrić	RTS
Ivana Popović	"U oku tvom" (У оку твом)	Slavko Šućur, Tanja Ðonlaga	RTCG
Jelena Tomašević	"Jutro" (Јутро)	Aleksandra Milutinović, Željko Joksimović	RTS
Koktel bend	"Minđuša" (Минђуша)	Leontina Vukomanović	RTS
Lu Lu	"Bolje da te nemam" (Боље да те немам)	Snežana Vukomanović, Mirko Vukomanović	RTS
~~Luna~~	~~"Sentimientos"~~	~~Čeda Čvorak~~	~~RTS~~
Maja Mitrović	"Nama treba ljubav" (Нама треба љубав)	Duško Trifunović, Rade Radivojević	RTS
Marija Božović	"Pronađi put" (Пронађи пут)	Nikola Radunović	RTCG
Marija Šerifović	"Ponuda" (Понуда)	Rastko Aksentijević	RTS
Marko Vukčević	"Govor tijela" (Говор тијела)	Marko Vukčević, Saša Vasić	RTCG
Nataša Kojić – Taša	"Dobre devojke" (Добре девојке)	Svetlana Slavković-Ceca, Marko Kon	RTS
No Name	"Zauvijek moja" (Заувијек моја)	Milan Perić, Slaven Knezović	RTCG
Ogi	"Hajde Cico" (Хајде Цицо)	Ognjan Radivojević, Marina Tucaković	RTS
Stevan Faddy	"Utjeha" (Утјеха)	Stevan Faddy	RTCG
Svetlana Raičković	"Praznina" (Празнина)	Svetlana Raičković	RTCG
Tatjana Đorđević	"Ko je kriv" (Ко је крив)	Snežana Vukomanović, Mirko Vukomanović	RTS
Teodora Bojović	"Ti si kriv" (Ти си крив)	Teodora Bojović	RTS
Viktorija	"Kaži sestro" (Кажи сестро)	Maja Miloš, Zoran Lesendrić	RTS

==== Final ====
The final took place on 4 March 2005 where twenty-three songs competed. The winner, "Zauvijek moja" performed by No Name, was decided by a combination of votes from a jury panel (8/9) and the Serbian and Montenegrin public via televoting (1/9). The Serbian jury consisted of Ognjen Popović (musician and composer), Petar Ivanović (conductor and professor at the Music Academy in Belgrade), Silvana Ružić-Grujić (RTS music editor and music critic) and Biljana Arsić-Krstić (musician), while the Montenegrin jury consisted of Marina Tuca (singer and music professor), Zoran Živković (producer and artistic director), Tonči Petrović (composer) and Tijana Jovović (music professor and critic). Eurovision contestants Constantinos Christoforou, who would represent Cyprus in 2005, and Martin Vučić, who would represent Macedonia in 2005, were featured as guest performers during the show.

Evropesma-Europjesma 2005 – 4 March 2005
R/O	Artist	Song	Jury	Televote		Total	Place
R/O	Artist	Song	Jury	Votes	Points	Total	Place
1	Lu Lu	"Bolje da te nemam"	2	—	0	2	19
2	No Name	"Zauvijek moja"	72	32,607	12	84	1
3	Džej and Maja	"Pobedila si me"	5	898	2	7	15
4	Ogi	"Hajde Cico"	44	4,187	7	51	3
5	Andrea Demirović	"Šta će mi dani"	38	1,784	4	42	5
6	Teodora Bojović	"Ti si kriv"	9	—	0	9	14
7	Ana Cvetković	"Nevidljiva"	24	748	1	25	10
8	Svetlana Raičković	"Praznina"	6	—	0	6	16
9	Jelena Tomašević	"Jutro"	44	16,978	10	54	2
10	Biljana Mitrović	"Kad ljubav umire"	2	—	0	2	19
11	Ivana Popović	"U oku tvom"	7	2,066	5	12	13
12	Koktel bend	"Minđuša"	6	—	0	6	16
13	Viktorija	"Kaži, sestro"	0	—	0	0	21
14	Andrijana Božović	"Sve ti boje dobro stoje"	32	1,466	3	35	6
15	Tatjana Đorđević	"Ko je kriv"	0	—	0	0	21
16	Bojan Marović	"Svejedno"	23	3,079	6	29	9
17	Maja Mitrović	"Nama treba ljubav"	30	—	0	30	8
18	Marija Šerifović	"Ponuda"	5	—	0	5	18
19	Marko Vukčević	"Govor tijela"	35	—	0	35	6
20	Nataša Kojić – Taša	"Dobre devojke"	0	—	0	0	21
21	Marija Božović	"Pronađi put"	23	—	0	23	11
22	Dušan Zrnić	"Nebo"	15	—	0	15	12
23	Stevan Faddy	"Utjeha"	42	4,283	8	50	4

Detailed Jury Votes
R/O	Song	RTS				RTCG				Total
R/O	Song	O. Popović	P. Ivanović	S. Ružić-Grujić	B. Arsić-Krstić	M. Tuca	Z. Živković	T. Petrović	T. Jovović	Total
1	"Bolje da te nemam"	2								2
2	"Zauvijek moja"	6	6	5	7	12	12	12	12	72
3	"Pobedila si me"		5							5
4	"Hajde Cico"	10	10	12	12					44
5	"Šta će mi dani"		4			8	8	8	10	38
6	"Ti si kriv"		3	3	1			2		9
7	"Nevidljiva"	1	7	4		6		4	2	24
8	"Praznina"							6		6
9	"Jutro"	12	12	10	10					44
10	"Kad ljubav umire"						1	1		2
11	"U oku tvom"					1			6	7
12	"Minđuša"				3				3	6
13	"Kaži, sestro"									0
14	"Sve ti boje dobro stoje"		8	1		5	6	7	5	32
15	"Ko je kriv"									0
16	"Svejedno"	4	1		4	4	5	5		23
17	"Nama treba ljubav"	7	2	8	6		7			30
18	"Ponuda"					2	3			5
19	"Govor tijela"	8		6	8	3	2		8	35
20	"Dobre devojke"									0
21	"Pronađi put"	3		2		7	4	3	4	23
22	"Nebo"	5		7	2				1	15
23	"Utjeha"				5	10	10	10	7	42

=== Controversy ===
During the voting of Evropesma-Europjesma 2005, the Montenegrin jurors did not award any points to the Serbian Beovizija 2005 winner and runner-up, Jelena Tomašević and Ogi. The probable partisan feeling that led to such a polarised outcome may be partly attributable to the fallout from earlier disputes, including a breach of the rules regarding the active airplay of the Serbian acts before the competition and that the Serbian jurors did not award any points to the Montenegrin acts in Evropesma-Europjesma 2004.

On 7 March, former Serbian and Montenegrin Eurovision contestant and composer of Tomašević's song, Željko Joksimović, released a statement expressing his dissatisfaction towards the voting process as "the songs from Serbia were outvoted in a deeply unfair manner", while RTCG responded by stating that they did not influence the voting in any way. Plagiarism claims were also made towards "Zauvijek moja" as the introduction of the song was taken from the unofficial hymn of the Liberal Party of Montenegro titled "Poljem se vije". Following an investigation by the European Broadcasting Union (EBU), the Eurovision Song Contest Reference Group concluded that "Zauvijek moja" was eligible for the contest.

== At Eurovision ==
According to Eurovision rules, all nations with the exceptions of the host country, the "Big Four" (France, Germany, Spain and the United Kingdom) and the twelve highest placed finishers in the 2004 contest are required to qualify from the semi-final in order to compete for the final; the top ten countries from the semi-final progress to the final. As Serbia and Montenegro finished second in the 2004 contest, the nation automatically qualified to compete in the final on 21 May 2005. On 22 March 2005, a special allocation draw was held which determined the running order for the semi-final and final, and Serbia and Montenegro was set to perform in position 12 in the final, following the entry from Israel and before the entry from Denmark. Serbia and Montenegro placed seventh in the final, scoring 137 points.

The semi-final and the final were broadcast in Serbia on RTS 1 and RTS Sat with commentary by Duška Vučinić-Lučić, and in Montenegro on TVCG 2 and TVCG Sat with commentary for the semi-final by Dražen Bauković and Tamara Ivanković, and commentary for the final by Danijel Popović who represented Yugoslavia in the Eurovision Song Contest 1983. The Serbian and Montenegrin spokesperson, who announced the Serbian and Montenegrin votes during the final, was Nina Radulović.

=== Voting ===
Below is a breakdown of points awarded to Serbia and Montenegro and awarded by Serbia and Montenegro in the semi-final and grand final of the contest. The nation awarded its 12 points to Croatia in the semi-final and to Greece in the final of the contest.

==== Points awarded to Serbia and Montenegro ====
Points awarded to Serbia and Montenegro (Final)
Score	Country
12 points	Austria; Croatia; Switzerland
10 points	Bosnia and Herzegovina; Cyprus; Macedonia; Slovenia
8 points	
7 points	
6 points	Albania; France; Greece; Monaco; Romania; Russia
5 points	
4 points	Bulgaria; Netherlands; Sweden
3 points	Belarus; Germany; Ukraine
2 points	Hungary
1 point	Moldova; Latvia

==== Points awarded by Serbia and Montenegro ====
Points awarded by Serbia and Montenegro (Semi-final)
Score	Country
12 points	Croatia
10 points	Macedonia
8 points	Hungary
7 points	Slovenia
6 points	Moldova
5 points	Romania
4 points	Norway
3 points	Israel
2 points	Switzerland
1 point	Bulgaria

Points awarded by Serbia and Montenegro (Final)
Score	Country
12 points	Greece
10 points	Croatia
8 points	Albania
7 points	Macedonia
6 points	Hungary
5 points	Moldova
4 points	Bosnia and Herzegovina
3 points	Romania
2 points	Norway
1 point	Cyprus
