= Ludi letnji ples =

2006 single by Flamingosi featuring Louis

Single by Flamingosi featuring Louis

from the album Gordost i predrasude
- Language: Serbian; Montenegrin; English
- English title: "Crazy Summer Dance"
- Released: 2006
- Studio: Studio ALKAtras; Studio O (Belgrade, Serbia and Montenegro)
- Label: Self-released
- Composers: Ognjen Amidžić; Marinko Madžgalj; Goran Stanković
- Lyricists: Ognjen Amidžić; Marinko Madžgalj; Marko Kon
- Producer: Marko Kon

Flamingosi singles chronology
"Razum i osećajnost" (2005)	"Ludi letnji ples" (2006)	"Zbog nje" (2026)

Louis singles chronology
"Ne kuni me, ne ruži me, majko" / "Ćororo" (1983)	"Ludi letnji ples" (2006)

"Ludi letnji ples" (Serbian Cyrillic: Луди летњи плес, lit. 'Crazy Summer Dance') is a song by Flamingosi featuring Louis from the Flamingosi album Gordost i predrasude, which came second in Evropesma 2006, Serbia and Montenegro's national final for the Eurovision Song Contest 2006.

== The Evropesma 2006 controversy ==
The song of the Montenegrin band No Name "Moja ljubavi" took second place in the Montenegrin semi-final Montevizija 2006, qualifying for the national final Evropesma. Flamingosi's song won the Serbian semi-final of Beovizija 2006 on 13 February 2006. Therefore, it was one of the twelve songs that qualified for the national final, Evropesma. In the final, the song finished in second place, behind "Moja ljubavi", which has won largely thanks to the support of the jury members from Montenegro. The members of the Montenegrin jury did not award any points to the two best-placed songs from Beovizija, including "Ludi letnji ples", which had also previously happened at Evropesma 2005. The jury's voting ended with an eight-point lead for the song "Moja ljubavi", exactly as much as they received from the members of the Serbian jury. In the TV voting, the audience gave 12,000 votes to Flamingosi and only 3,500 to No Name. The disgruntled audience in the hall demanded that Flamingosi and Louis sing for them at the end of the program, not the official winners, which is what later happened.

== Aftermath ==
Radio Television of Serbia did not want to accept victory and planned to organize a new national final whose outcome would be entirely determined by televoting. Radio and Television of Montenegro refused, claiming the result to have been legitimate. Unable to reach an agreement, Serbia and Montenegro withdrew from Eurovision 2006.

The State Union of Serbia and Montenegro dissolved following a referendum on 21 May 2006, one day after the Eurovision final. Since the 2007 competition, Serbia and Montenegro have competed individually.

== Reception ==
The public reception was positive, it became a hit in the Balkan region, and some even called the song "the Serbian 'Macarena'". There are several versions of this song. The first one is the original version for the Evropesma competition ("Al' džaba Remix"), the post-competition version with mention of the defeat and the cities of Serbia and Montenegro, not European capital cities ("Realni Remix"), and the semi-instrumental version with only the female vocals and the chorus ("Karaoke Remix").

In the 2020s, the song became popular again on TikTok.

== Track list ==
Maxi-single CD

1. "Ludi letnji ples" (Al' džaba Remix)
2. "Ludi letnji ples" (Realni Remix)
3. "Ludi letnji ples" (Karaoke Remix)
4. "Ljubav" (music video)
5. "Obala" (music video)
6. "Ruska" (music video)
