= Marinko Madžgalj =

Serbian actor and singer (1978–2016)

- Маринко Маџгаљ
- Born: 21 August 1978; Belgrade, SR Serbia, SFR Yugoslavia
- Died: 26 March 2016 (aged 37); Belgrade, Serbia
- Education: Faculty of Dramatic Arts
- Alma mater: University of Arts in Belgrade
- Occupations: Actor; singer
- Years active: 2003–2016
- Spouse: Dubravka Mijatović (m. 2007; div. 2014)
- Musical career
- Also known as: Valentino
- Genres: Folk; rock; jazz
- Instruments: Vocals
- Label: City Records
- Formerly of: Flamingosi

Marinko Madžgalj (Serbian Cyrillic: Маринко Маџгаљ; 21 August 1978 – 26 March 2016) was a Serbian actor, singer and television presenter. He raise to prominence as a singer of music duo Flamingosi.

== Biography ==
Madžgalj was born in Belgrade, Yugoslavia and was raised in Kotor, present-day Montenegro. He was one half of the Flamingosi duo with TV presenter Ognjen Amidžić. His stage name in the duo is Valentino. Madžgalj died of pancreatic cancer on 26 March 2016.

== Selected filmography ==
=== Television ===
Year	Title	Role	Notes
2003-2007	Crni Gruja	Čeda Velja	TV series
2007-2008	Ne daj se, Nina	Dragan Popadić	TV series
2008-2009	Ranjeni orao	Safet	TV series
2009-2010	Greh njene majke	Kosta	TV series

== Discography ==
=== with Flamingosi ===
Studio albums

- Gordost i predrasude (2006)
- Seti se našeg zaveta (A strana) (2011)
- Seti se našeg zaveta (B strana) (2014)

Compilation albums

- Hitovi (2022)
- Zlatna kolekcija (with Oskar; 2025)

Maxi-singles

- "Razum i osećajnost" (2005)
- "Ludi letnji ples" (featuring Louis; 2006)

Awards and achievements
Preceded by Jelena Tomašević	Beovizija winner (as part of Flamingosi) feat Louis; 2006	Succeeded by Marija Šerifović
