= Jelena Tomašević discography =

Jelena Tomašević Serbia discography
- Studio albums: 1
- Singles: 5
- Music videos: 4

This page includes the discography of the Serbian artist Jelena Tomašević.

== Studio albums ==
Year	Album
2008	"Panta Rei": 1st studio album

== Singles ==
Year	Single	Chart positions		Album
Year	Single	RS	EU	Album
2004	"Kad ne bude tvoje ljubavi"			—
2005	"Jutro"			Panta Rei
2008	"Oro"			Panta Rei
2008	"Košava"			Panta Rei
2008	"Okeani"			Panta Rei
2009	"Time to Pray" (with Boaz & Sirusho)			—

== Music videos ==
- "Jutro" (2005)
- "Oro" (2008)
- "Košava" (2008)
- "Okeani" (2008)
