= Serbia and Montenegro in the Eurovision Song Contest =

- Eurovision Song Contest
- Former participating broadcaster: Udruženje javnih radija i televizija (UJRT)

Participation summary
- Appearances: 2
- First appearance: 2004
- Last appearance: 2005
- Highest placement: 2nd: 2004
- Participation history: 2004; 2005; ~~2006~~

Related articles
- Evropesma
- Serbia and Montenegro's page at Eurovision.com

The State Union of Serbia and Montenegro was represented at the Eurovision Song Contest twice: in 2004 and in 2005. Their debut appearance was a success, with the song "Lane moje" performed by Željko Joksimović finishing second. The following year, they placed seventh, with "Zauvijek moja" by the band No Name. The Serbian-Montenegrin participating broadcaster in the contest was Udruženje javnih radija i televizija (UJRT) which selected its entrant with the national selection Evropesma.

UJRT originally planned to participate in the 2006 contest but due to a scandal in the national selection which caused tensions between the Serbian and Montenegrin broadcasters that formed the UJRT, it withdrew from the competition while retaining the right to vote. Following the 2006 Montenegrin independence referendum, Serbia and Montenegro have participated in the contest as separate entities, making their independent debuts in 2007.

== Participation ==
Before the creation of the State Union of Serbia and Montenegro, the Socialist Republic of Serbia and the Socialist Republic of Montenegro participated in the contest as part of Yugoslavia (representing the Socialist Federal Republic of Yugoslavia from 1961 to 1991). At the 1992 contest, following the breakup of SFR Yugoslavia, Serbia and Montenegro competed as Yugoslavia representing the Federal Republic of Yugoslavia. FR Yugoslavia was banned from participating in the 1993 edition due to UN sanctions during the Yugoslav Wars. This marked the start of a decade-long absence from the contest for the territories.

Udruženje javnih radija i televizija (UJRT) was able to join the European Broadcasting Union (EBU) in 2001 after sanctions were lifted, thus eligible to participate in the Eurovision Song Contest then. It participated in the contest representing Serbia and Montenegro in its 49th edition in 2004 and 50th edition in 2005.

== History ==
In 2002, UJRT sent an application to take part in the 2003 contest, however, they were unable to take part after the EBU decided that too many countries would be relegated if the country took part.

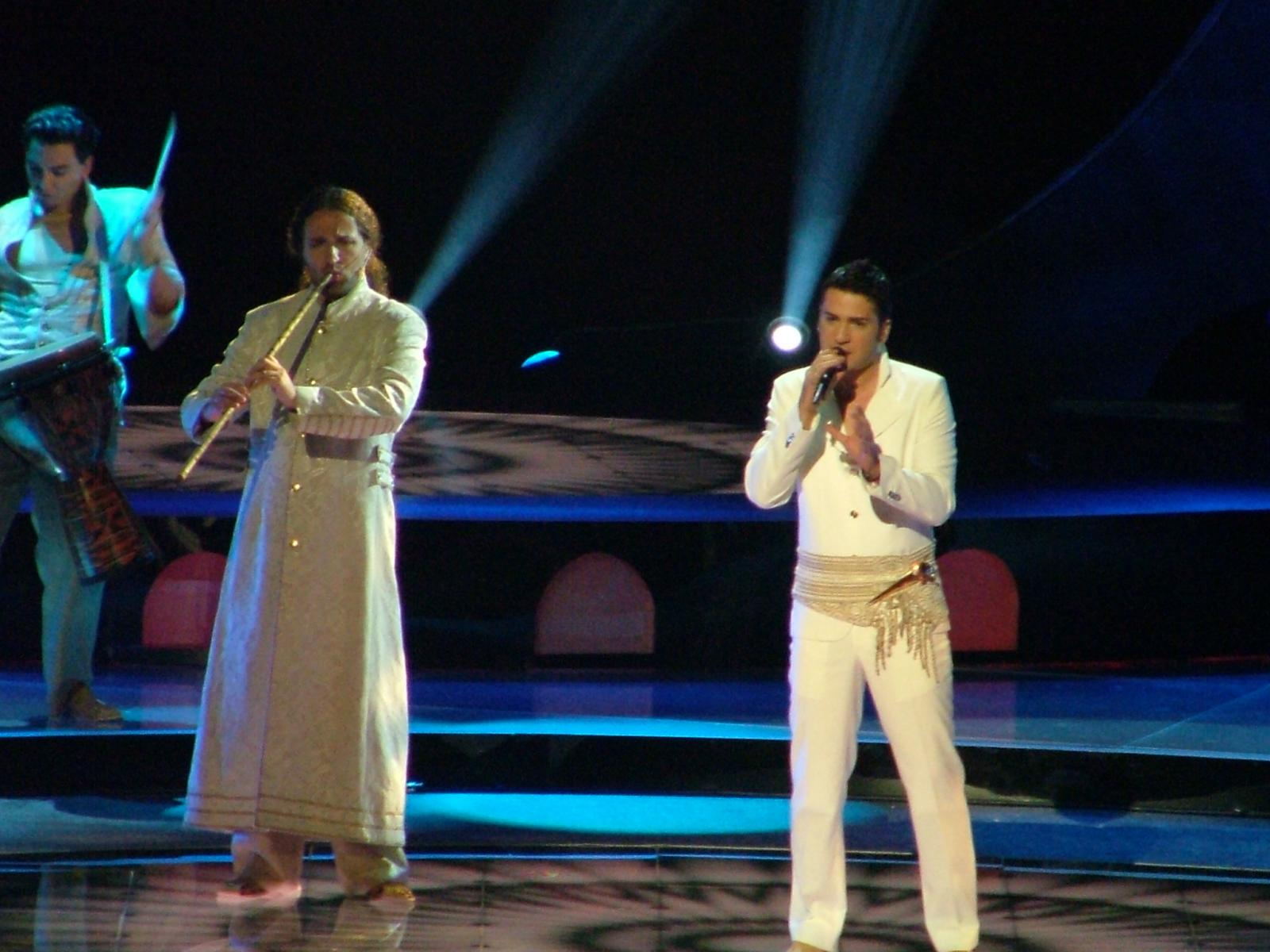
Željko Joksimović performing "Lane moje" in Istanbul (2004)

Serbia and Montenegro debuted at the 2004 contest with the song "Lane moje" performed by Željko Joksimović, finishing first in the semi-final and second in the final. The song has become popular amongst many Eurovision fans and it is often rated as one of the best non-winning songs.

The following year, Serbia and Montenegro was represented by band No Name with the song "Zauvijek moja" and placed seventh in final. No Name were close to becoming the national entry once more, for the 2006 contest in Athens, however since their 2006 win of Evropesma had been disputed due to allegations of tactical voting by the Montenegrin jury, UJRT did not reach an agreement on sending them to the contest again. On 20 March 2006, Serbia and Montenegro officially withdrew from the Eurovision Song Contest 2006. The country did however participate in voting in final of the contest. The Eurovision semi-final was not broadcast in Montenegro in 2006, and so the votes from Serbia and Montenegro, were from Serbia alone. In the final, Serbia once again voted alone, whilst the votes were presented as being from Serbia and Montenegro.

After the Montenegrin referendum on independence and dissolution of the state union in June 2006, both countries sent separate entries to the Eurovision Song Contest 2007. Montenegro made their debut as an independent state and sent Stevan Faddy, while Serbia sent Marija Šerifović as their debut entrant. Her song "Molitva" ended up winning the contest for Serbia, bringing the 2008 contest to Belgrade the following year.

== Participation overview ==
Table key
1	First place
2	Second place
◇	Entry selected but did not compete

Year	Artist	Song	Language	Final	Points	Semi	Points
2004	Željko Joksimović and Ad-Hoc Orchestra	"Lane moje" (Лане моје)	Serbian	2	263	1	263
2005	No Name	"Zauvijek moja" (Заувијек моја)	Montenegrin	7	137	Top 12 in 2004 final (Note: According to the then-Eurovision rules, the top ten non-Big Four countries from the previous year along with the Big Four automatically qualified for the grand final without having to compete in semi-finals. For example, if Germany and France placed inside the top ten, the 11th and 12th spots were advanced to next year's grand final along with all countries ranked in the top ten.)	
2006	No Name ◇	"Moja ljubavi" (Моја љубави) ◇	Montenegrin ◇	Withdrawn		Top 10 in 2005 final	

== Awards ==
=== Marcel Bezençon Awards ===
Year	Category	Song	Composer(s) lyrics (l) / music (m)	Performer	Final	Points	Host city	Ref.
2004	Press Award	"Lane moje" (Лане моје)	Željko Joksimović (m), Leontina Vukomanović (l)	Željko Joksimović	2	263	(Turkey) Istanbul	
2005	Composer Award	"Zauvijek moja" (Заувијек моја)	Slaven Knezović (m), Milan Perić (l)	No Name	7	137	(Ukraine) Kyiv	

== Commentators and spokespersons ==
Year	Channel	Commentator(s)	Spokesperson	Ref.
2003	RTS 2	Unknown	Did not participate	
2004	RTS 1	Duška Vučinić-Lučić and Stanko Crnobrnja (Final)	Nataša Miljković	
2005	RTS 1	Unknown	Nina Radulović	
2005	TVCG 1	Unknown	Nina Radulović	
2006	RTS 1	Duška Vučinić-Lučić	Jovana Janković	

- From 1961 until 1992, Serbia and Montenegro competed as part of Yugoslavia.

== See also ==
- Evropesma
- Yugoslavia in the Eurovision Song Contest
- Serbia in the Eurovision Song Contest
- Montenegro in the Eurovision Song Contest
- Serbia and Montenegro in the Junior Eurovision Song Contest
