= No Name (Montenegrin band) =

Montenegrin musical group

- Origin: Montenegro
- Genres: Pop
- Years active: 2003—2008, 2026-
- Members: Marko Perić; Marko Prentić; Danijel Alibabić; Branko Nedović; Dragoljub Purlija; Bojan Jovović

No Name (Montenegrin: Но нејм, romanized: No nejm) was a Montenegrin boyband, founded on 19 November 2003.

No Name is best known for the controversies surrounding their participation in the national pre-selection for the Eurovision Song Contest. The group made its debut in 2005, with the song Zauvijek moja (Forever Mine), winning the 2005 Europjesma and thus representing Serbia and Montenegro in the Eurovision Song Contest 2005. The group placed 7th in the ESC with a total of 137 points, succeeding in obtaining the straight pass to the final of the Eurovision Song Contest 2006 for Serbia and Montenegro. However, due to controversy following the band's selection to represent the country again the following year, Serbia and Montenegro withdrew from the contest. In both cases, the situation was inflamed by Serbian and Montenegrin politicians, and was taken as symbolic of nationalist movements within the two countries.

== History ==
No Name was founded on 19 November 2003.

In November 2006, bassist Marko Perić left the group for an unknown reason.

The group disbanded in 2008.

=== Eurovision ===
No Name made its Eurovision debut in 2005, with the song Zauvijek moja. The group won the 2005 Eurojesma contest, held in Podgorica. However, their win was contested. The Eurojesma, which at the time was how Serbia and Montenegro chose its Eurovision contestants, was prone to nationalistic interpretations. Serbian and Montenegrin bands were both accused of having nationalistic intentions.

Voting in the Eurojesma was decided by a jury, rather than by televoting, due to Serbia’s population being significantly more than Montenegro's. Two teams of four jurors, with four appointed by Radio and Television of Montenegro (RTCG) and four appointed by Radio Television of Serbia (RTS), with a ninth vote decided by televoting. During the contest, the Montenegrin jurors were accused of nationalist bias.

Following No Name's win, they were accused of having support from the Montenegrin government, including in the form of vote tampering. These allegations were proven untrue. There were also allegations of biased voting from the Montenegrin judges. Following the controversy, the European Broadcasting Union (EBU) investigated the contest for alleged wrongdoing. However, none was found and No Name went on to participate in the Eurovision Song Contest 2005.

The following year, Eurovision Song Contest 2006 was set to take place one day before the 2006 Montenegrin independence referendum. As a result, there was greater nationalist sentiments than the year before. No Name once again won the Eurojesma contest, with the song Moja Ijubavi, but this time, the controversy was stronger. The contest was held in Belgrade, and following their victory, the Montenegrin band was booed by the Serbian crowd.

During voting, some members of the audience decided that the block voting demonstrated by the Montenegrin jurors meant that the top Serbian performers, Flamingosi and Ana Nikolić, didn't have a chance. Amidst this, there was an audience walk out. Following the announcement of the band's victory, the audience continued booing and leaving, with some members throwing bottles at the stage. No Name then left the stage without performing their song again. They had to be escorted out of the building for their own safety. Following this, Flamingosi, who came in second place, performed in place of No Name. Later, Flamingosi frontman Marinko Madžgalj alleged misconduct.

Following this, the contest was investigated and found to show no signs of wrongdoing. However, Udruženje javnih radija i televizija (UJRT), the national public broadcaster of Serbia and Montenegro, released a statement denouncing the voting and refusing to acknowledge No Name's victory. The head of the UJRT, who was also the head of the RTS, requested the RTCG that a new contest be held, with results solely based on televoting. However, the RTCG denied this request and instead asked the EBU to investigate again. The EBU denied and said that the RTS and RTCG would need to come to a conclusion on their own.

No conclusion was reached. The day that submissions were due, Serbia and Montenegro withdrew from Eurovision, with no winner having been decided conclusively. The failure to reach a conclusion was taken by some as a stand-in for the failings that Serbia and Montenegro's union had suffered from.

Following the 2006 referendum, Montenegro became an independent country. Starting with the Eurovision Song Contest 2007, Montenegro began participating on their own. However, No Name did not return to the contest.

== Members ==
- Marko Prentić (vocal, solo guitar)
- Danijel Alibabić (vocal)
- Branko Nedović (keyboards)
- Dragoljub Purlija (drums)
- Bojan Jovović (keyboards, backing vocal).
- Marko Perić (2003–2006) (bass guitar)

== Singles ==
- Za Tebe i Mene (Sunčane Skale 2004 - 2nd place)
- Budućnost (FK Budućnost Podgorica supporters' song)
- Zauvijek moja (Eurovision Song Contest 2005 - 7th place)
- Moja ljubavi (Evropesma 2006 - 1st place, withdrawn from Eurovision)
- Forever Mine
- Kad Budemo Zajedno (Music Festival Budva 2006)
- Moja Mala (duet with Macedonian singer Bojana)
- Postelja od Leda (Music Festival Budva 2007 - 2nd place)
- Kad Kažeš Ne (Radijski Festival 2007)
- Pronađi me

== Awards and nominations ==
Year	Award	Category	Nominee(s)	Result	Ref.
2005	Montefon Awards	Discovery of the Year	No Name	Won	
2007	Montefon Awards	Group of the Year	No Name	Won	

== See also ==
- Europjesma
- Serbia and Montenegro in the Eurovision Song Contest
- Radio Television of Montenegro
- Eurovision Song Contest

Awards and achievements
Preceded by Željko Joksimović	Serbia and Montenegro in the Eurovision Song Contest; 2005	Succeeded by (Serbia) Marija Šerifović (Montenegro) Stevan Faddy
Preceded by Željko Joksimović	Evrop(j)esma winner 2005, 2006	Succeeded by None
Preceded by None	Montevizija winner 2005	Succeeded by Stevan Faddy
