= Grimm (band) =

Montenegrin gothic metal band

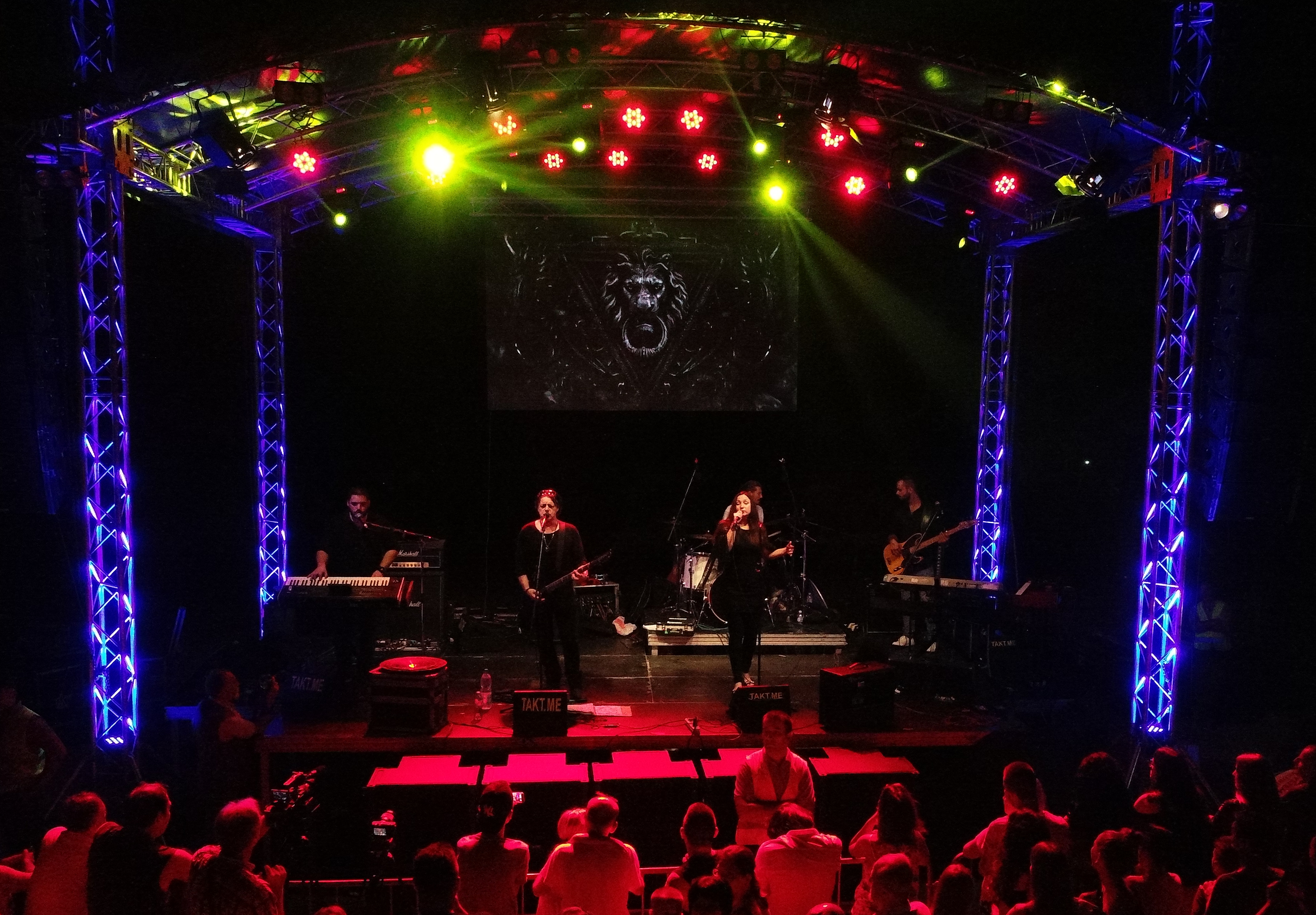
- Grimm performing in Bar, Montenegro in 2018

Background information
- Origin: Bar, Serbia and Montenegro (Now Bar, Montenegro)
- Genres: Gothic rock Gothic metal
- Years active: 1999–2008 (when the group was called Grim); 2008–present (as Grimm)
- Labels: Muzička Asocijacija Crne Gore, Miner
- Members: Nebojša Đukanović; Ivana Janković; Branko Marković; Marko Šoć; Filip Kustudić; Veljko Ivanovic
- Past members: Dragan Miljanović; Darko Mihailović; Igor Perović; Vladimir Popović

Grimm, formerly known as Grim, is a Montenegrin gothic rock-metal band. It was formed in 1999 in Bar, Montenegro. Their first single, "Rijeka Moga Sna" (River of My Dreams), was released in 2003. The band also took part in the Serbo-Montenegrin Eurovision Song Contest national qualifier, Evropesma, in 2006 with "Uspavanka" (Lullaby), and the Montenegrin national finals in 2007 and 2008. The band's lead guitarist and vocalist, composer and lyrics author, Nebojša Đukanović, took part in Montevizija 2005 but did not make it to Evropesma. They dissolved in 2008, just after their first album has been released, but the band was reestablished as rock duo Grimm with members Nebojša Đukanović and Ivana Janković. Since 2015, the band started work on their second album called "Iza Tišine" (Beyond Silence) in Lazarevac, Serbia, with producer Boris Šurlan.

In 2025, the band released the singles "Prah" and "Kroz prste" from their album, Between the Worlds. It also added guitarist Veljko Ivanovic to its lineup.

== Members ==
- Nebojša Đukanović - (lead vocal; guitar)
- Ivana Janković - (vocal)
- Marko Mirković - (bass)
- Željko Samardžić- (bubnjevi)
- Veljko Ivanovic (guitar)

=== Former members ===
- Igor Perović – composer, keyboards
- Vladimir Popović – drums
- Dragan Miljanović – solo guitar
- Darko Mihailović – bass guitar
- Dražen Miljanović - bass
- Josip Raičević - solo gitara
- Marko Šoć - drums
- Milan Svjekloća - bass
- Branko Marković - bass
- Mitar Škuletić - keyboards
- Filip kustudić - solo gitara

== Discography ==
as Grim

- Neomeđeni (2008) (Muzička Asocijacija Crne Gore)

as Grimm

- Iza Tišine (2016) (Miner Records)

=== Singles ===
- "Rijeka Moga Sna" (2003)
- "Idi sam" (2003)
- "Uspavanka" (Montevizija 2006 / Evropesma) (2006)
- "Mjeseče" (Sunčane Skale) (2006)
- "Začaran" Montevizija (2005)
- "Dina"
- "Kada Ona Ljubi Te" (MontenegroSong 2007) (2007)
- "Vjetar te odnosi" (as duo Ivana and Nebojsa Grimm) (2010)
- "Poslednje tkanje" (as duo Ivana and Nebojsa Grimm) (2010)
- "Igla u oku tvoje duše" (2015)
- "Spuštam se" (2016)
- "Aquarius" (2016)
- "Vratiću se" (2021)
- "Stari moj" (2023)
- "Prah" (2024)
- "Kroz prste" (2025)
