= Negre (band) =

Montenegrin girl band

Negre were a Montenegrin girl band, consisting of Jelena Kažanegra, Milena Vučić and Nina Žižić. They competed in the Serbo-Montenegrin Eurovision Song Contest preselection Evropesma 2004 in Belgrade, where they won the 3rd place. Later that year they won the 3rd place on Sunčane Skale Festival in Montenegro. Soon after that, Nina Žižić left the band. She was temporary replaced by Marija Brajović, but the band soon fell apart. All of the former members are now successful solo artists in Montenegro.

== Discography ==
=== Songs ===
- "K'o nijedna druga" (2004)
- "Kao" (2004)
