= Maja Nikolić =

Serbian singer and television personality (born 1975)

Maja Nikolić Маја Николић
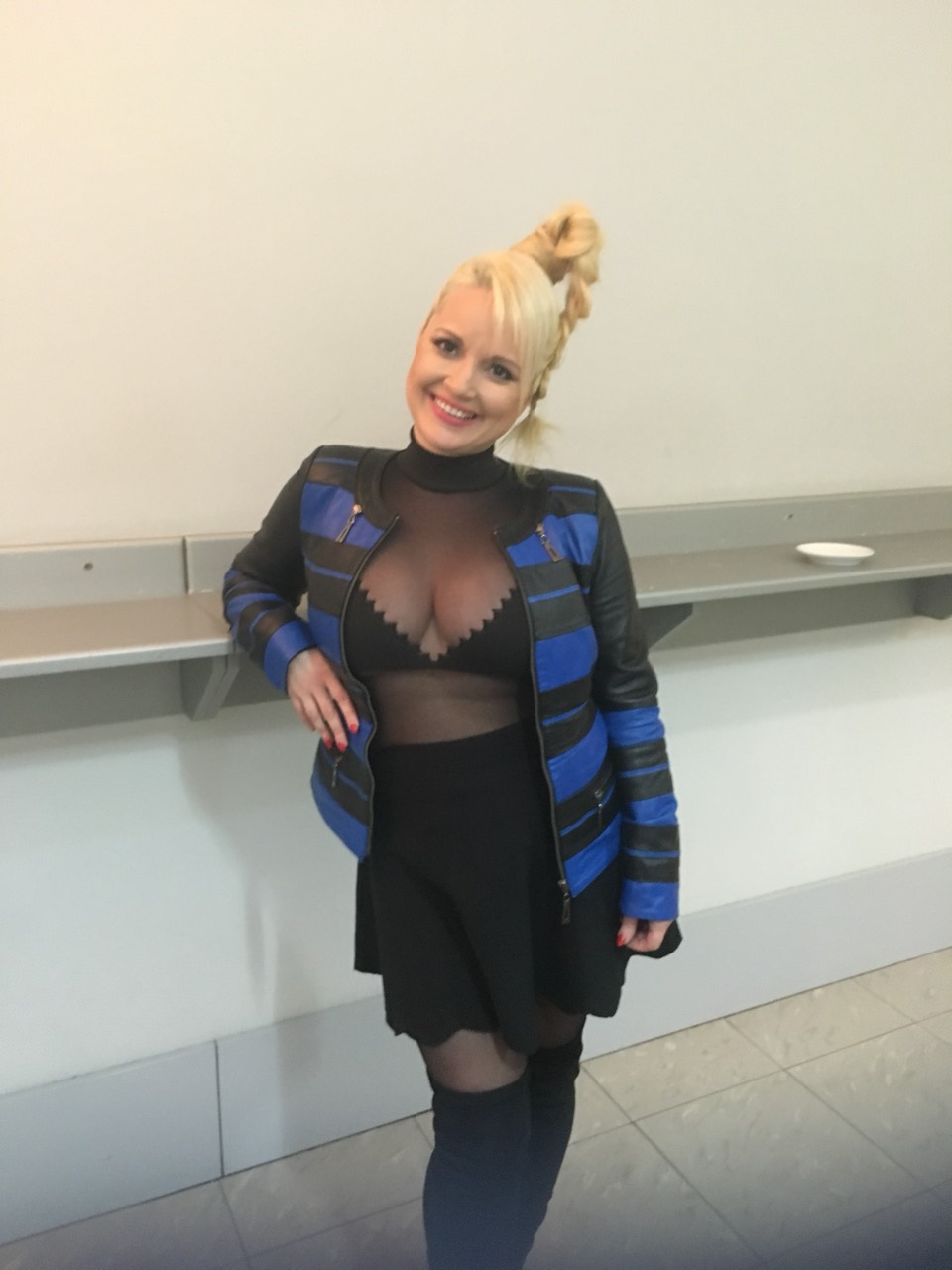
- Nikolić in 2018

Background information
- Born: Marija Nikolić; 11 April 1975 (age 51); Niš, SR Serbia, Yugoslavia
- Genres: Pop, ethno-pop
- Occupations: Singer; television personality
- Instrument: Vocals
- Years active: 1991–present
- Labels: PGP-RTS; City Records
- Website: majanikolic.com

Marija Nikolić (Serbian: Маја Николић, born 11 April 1975), better known as Maja Nikolić, is a Serbian singer and reality television personality. Born and raised in Niš, she pursued a singing career in the early 90s by competing on music festivals. Nikolić has released six studio albums.

== Career in music ==
In February 1994, Nikolić rose to prominence by competing on the International Music Fair (MESAM) in Belgrade with "Odlazi", winning three first prizes. The following year, she released her debut album Sad me pronađi under PGP-RTS. Nikolić has cited singer Maja Odžaklijevska as her musical influence and supporter during her beginnings. In May 1998, she participated on the Slavianski Bazar in Odesa, Ukraine and Saratov, Russia where she sung "Više nisi moj" and "Đelem, Đelem", arranged by her frequent collaborator Vladimir Graić and Željko Joksimović. As the winner, Nikolić performed at the Red Square. Also in 1998, she released her second album Uzmi me, which was promoted with her first solo concert in Sava Centar, held in February 1999.

Following her third album Iz inata, released in 2000, Nikolić left Serbia and moved to the United States where she performed at Harry's Velvet Room in downtown Chicago, Illinois. She also served as the opening act at Diana Ross' charity concert for disabled children at the China Club in New York City. Nikolić also performed "Something To Talk About" from the 2002 movie About A Boy at the 7th Golden Satellite Awards.

== Personal life ==
Nikolić stated that she graduated from the Svetozar Marković Grammar School in Niš and later attended the Stella Adler Studio of Acting in Los Angeles.

She has two sons.

== Discography ==
Studio albums

- Sad Me Pronađi (1995)
- Uzmi Me (1998)
- Iz Inata (2000)
- Za Moju Dušu (2006)
- Crveno (2011)
- Zemlja Čuda (2018)

== Music festivals ==
- MESAM (1994) - "Odlazi"
- Beogradsko proleće (1994) - "Napustio si sve"
- Sunčane skale (1994) - "Baš sam se zaljubila"
- Budvanski festival (1994) - "Milion suza"
- MESAM (1996) - "Svaki sam tren tebi suđena"
- Beogradsko proleće (1998) - "Ne traži me više"
- Slavianski Bazar (1998) - "Više nisi moj" and "Đelem, đelem"
- Sunčane skale (1998) - "Varali me svi"
- Zrenjaninski festival (2003) - "Bolesna"
- Golden Satellite (2003) - "Something To Talk About"
- Sunčane skale (2005) - "Stoti put"
- Radijski festival (2006) - "Pokloni se"
- Budvanski festival (2007) - "Delirijum"
- Ohridski festival (2008) - "Samo za tvoje oči"
- Vrnjačka banja (2012) - "Glas"
- Ohridski festival (2017) - "Suvenir"

Eurovision Song Contest national selection

- Beovizija (2003) - "Granica"
- Beovizija (2004) - "Otrov u malim bočicama" (feat. Ceca Slavković); 19th place
- Evropesma (2006) - "Kad ti treba"; 13th place
- Beovizija (2007) - "Ja znam da ti me ne voliš"; 14th place
- Beosong (2013) - Blagoslov"; 11th place
- Beovizija (2018) - "Zemlja čuda"; 10th place
- Pesma za Evroviziju '25 (2025) - "Žali srce moje"; failed to qualify for the final

== Filmography ==
List of television appearances of Maja Nikolić
Year	Title	Role	Notes
2003	Beovizija	Herself	20th place
2004	Beovizija	Herself	19th place
2006	Beovizija	Herself	13th place
2007	Beovizija	Herself	14th place
2009	Farma	Herself	Season 1, 4th place
2011	Dvor	Herself	Disqualified
2013	Veliki Brat	Herself	VIP Season 5, evicted
2013	Beosong	Herself	Failed to qualify
2015	Farma	Herself	Season 6, 6th place
2016–2017	Pinkove Zvezde	Herself	Season 3, judge
2018	Beovizija	Herself	10th place
2025	Pesma za Evroviziju '25	Herself	Failed to qualify
