= Beovizija 2022 =

Dates and venue
- Semi-final 1: ~~February 2022~~
- Semi-final 2: ~~February 2022~~
- Final: ~~February 2022~~

Production
- Director: Saša Mirković

Participants
- Number of entries: 36

Beovizija 2022 was supposed to be the eleventh edition of the Serbian music festival Beovizija held in February 2022. For the first time since 2003, the festival would not be used to select the Serbian representative at the Eurovision Song Contest. This was supposed to be the first edition of the contest to not be hosted by the Radio Television of Serbia (RTS). It is assumed that Beovizija was to be broadcast via Prva Srpska Televizija or Hype TV, which is in part owned by the Megaton Production producer Saša Mirković.

== RTS ends collaboration with Beovizija ==
Olivera Kovačević, editor of RTS' Entertainment Program has announced in October 2021 that the Serbian national selection for the Eurovision Song Contest 2022 under the provisional name of RTS takmičenje za Pesmu Evrovizije (RTS contest for the Eurovision Song Contest) would only be held if the epidemic measures of the government of Serbia allow them to do so. After this, Saša Mirković, a partial owner of Megaton Productions, announced the end of cooperation with RTS on Beovizija. In their official statement, they stated that they are the sole owners of the Beovizija format. The official statement of Megaton Production was as follows:

"When the festival was established in 2003, RTS did not have the right to send a representative to Eurovision, which is also a private festival, only at a European level. The first winner of Beovizija was Toše Proeski, and back then, RTS was just a broadcaster of the festival. When the EBU allowed RTS to send its representative to the Eurovision Song Contest, the production of "Megaton" handed over the license to RTS in exchange for a fee. Since then, RTS has had the task of selecting participants and members of the jury, and we have only done the executive production. It has been like that for many years and Beovizija has always been a beautiful festival. After the arrival of Olivera Kovačević as the editor of the RTS' Entertainment Program, problems began with fixing the participants and winners of Beovizija.”

They also added that RTS' license expired in 2020.

== Format ==
The application process opened in November, and was open until 1 January 2022.

=== Rules ===
The following rules were listed on the Megaton Production site:

- Songs that are submitted must not be performed publicly or registered for another festival.
- All performers and composers who are of legal age had the right to submit a song.
- A selection committee will select 36 songs that will participate in the first and second semi-final evening.
- The 16 best placed from the semi-final evenings will take part in the final dinner.
- A journalist jury, an expert jury and a televoting will decide on the placement of the songs.
- The first prize is 50,000 euros, the second prize is 30,000 euros, and the third prize is 20,000 euros.
- All applications should be sent by e-mail
- Send a demo recording of the composition with the application.
- After the decision of the selection committee, all authors and performers will be contacted.
- All detailed information can be found on the website www.megaton.rs
