= Panta Rei (Jelena Tomašević album) =

Studio album by Jelena Tomašević
- Released: October 2008
- Recorded: 2007–2008
- Genre: Pop, ethnic
- Length: 56:37
- Label: Minacord

Singles from Panta Rei
- 1. "Jutro" Released: 4 March 2005; 2. "Nema koga" Released: 3 November 2005; 3. "Oro" Released: 10 March 2008; 4. "Košava" Released: 30 July 2008; 5. "Okeani" Released: 20 November 2008; 6. "Panta Rei" Released: 18 March 2009; 7. "Med I Zaoka" Released: 5 August 2009

Panta Rei is the debut album of Serbian singer Jelena Tomašević. The album features two songs that she entered to represent Serbia (and Montenegro) in the Eurovision Song Contest: Jutro (2005) and Oro (2008).

This album was released in October 2008.

== Track listing ==
#	Title	English translation	Time	Notes
1	"Panta Rei"	Everything Flows	4:12	
2	"Košava"	Košava	3:40	
3	"Okeani"	Oceans	2:59	
4	"Ako opet odlaziš"	If You Leave Again	4:41	
5	"Med i žaoka"	Honey and the Sting	4:51	
6	"Oro"	Oro	3:04	Featuring Bora Dugić. Won Beovizija 2008. Sixth place in ESC 2008
7	"Ne dam na tebe"	I Don't Give In To You	4:20	
8	"Nema koga"	There Is No-one	3:31	Featured in the film "Ivkova Slava"
9	"Zovi me danima"	Call Me For Days	3:48	
10	"Jutro"	Morning	3:06	Earned second place in Evropesma 2005
11	"Noćas dođi mi"	Come to Me Tonight	3:18	
12	"Minha dor"	My pain	3:03	Portuguese version of "Oro"
13	"Έλα αγάπη (Ela agapi)"	Come on, Love.	3:06	Greek version of "Oro"
14	"Adiós amor"	Goodbye, Love.	3:04	Spanish version of "Oro"
15	"Oro (House remix)"	—	5:39	

Songs 12–15 are bonus tracks.
