= Jelena Tomašević =

Serbian pop singer

- Јелена Томашевић
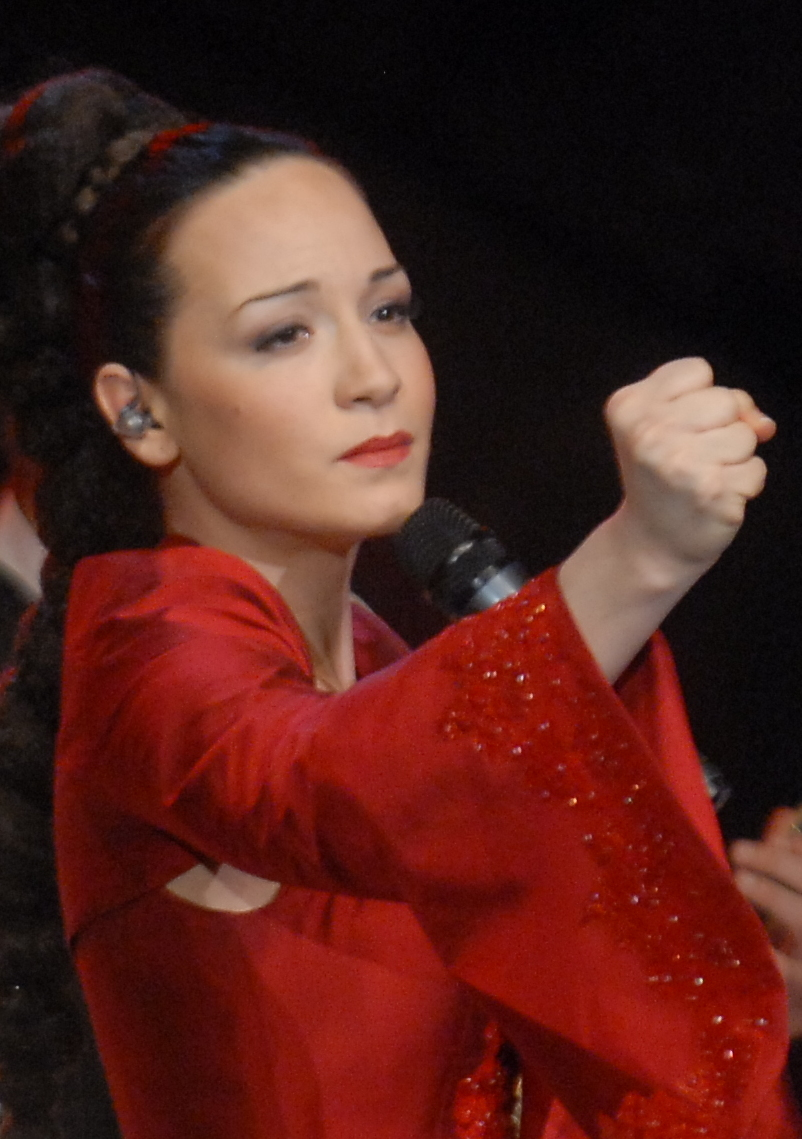
- Tomašević performing at Beovizija 2008
- Born: November 1, 1983 (age 42); Negotin, SR Serbia, Yugoslavia
- Years active: 2001–present
- Spouse: Ivan Bosiljčić
- Relatives: Darko Tomašević
- Musical career
- Genres: Traditional pop; folk; ethnic
- Instrument: Vocals
- Labels: Minacord; City Records
- Website: www.tomasevicjelena.com

Jelena Tomašević Bosiljčić (Note: Serbian Cyrillic: Јелена Томашевић Босиљчић, pronounced [jělena tomǎːʃevitɕ bosiːʎtʃitɕ]) (born November 1, 1983) is a Serbian pop singer and a musical artist. She represented Serbia at Eurovision Song Contest 2008, finishing sixth overall with the song "Oro". In the span of her 25-year long career, Tomašević has released three studio albums Panta rei (2008), Ime moje (2015) and Iskrena (2024).

Tomašević is married to Serbian actor Ivan Bosiljčić since 2011. The two have a daughter. Tomašević is fluent in English. She has also sung in Italian, Spanish, Portuguese and Macedonian. Tomašević is an Orthodox Christian.

== Music career ==
=== 1996-2006: Early career and singles ===
Jelena gained notability at the age of eight when she won the top award at the children's music festival "Šarenijada" in Kragujevac and three years later, she became the winner of the Yugoslav Children's Festival. After becoming a member of the Abrašević Folklore Ensemble, one of the most successful Serbian ensembles, her music career soared. She achieved tremendous results at the most prestigious festivals in Central and Eastern Europe (Czech Republic, Belarus, Bulgaria etc.). In 1996. at the Folklore Festival Serbian Ensemble's she won the award of the best soloist.

In 2002, Jelena emerged on the Serbian music scene and her career as a pop singer started to take off. She competed and won over the jury in an Idol style show, called "3K dur" aired on RTS3 with the aim of promoting young talented artists.

After this turning point in Jelena's career, she made a huge breakthrough. In 2003, she competed for the first time at the Budva Festival and finished second at the prestigious festival "Slavjanski bazar" in Belarus. The same year she collaborated with music group Biber.

In 2004, singing the song "Kad ne bude tvoje ljubavi" with great success at the Beovizija Festival, the Serbian selection for the Eurovision Song Contest.

In 2005, she started a professional involvement with popular Serbian singer Željko Joksimović. She became a member of Minacord Production Company. At the Beovizija 2005, she sang the song "Jutro" composed by Željko Joksimović, written by Aleksandra Milutinović and won. Jelena was considered one of the favourites, ultimately she missed out in controversial fashion at the overall Serbia and Montenegro final (Evropesma), when all four Montenegrin jurors overlooked it in distributing their points. This was the final appearance at the contest for a united Serbia and Montenegro.

Later the same year, she sang the soundtrack to the film Ivkova slava which was written by Željko Joksimović. The film pulled in a record number of viewers. In September 2005, she sang at the opening of the EuroBasket 2005 in Belgrade. At the end of this year she was a guest in Joksimović's album.

=== 2007-2025: Panta Rei, Ime moje and Iskrena ===
Many songs of her debut album Panta rei are written by her. In 2007, was her first appearance as a lyrics writer, she wrote the song "Gotova stvar", for the Montenegrin singer Milena Vučić.

In December 2007, Jelena Tomašević entered the Beovizija 2008. Open competition with song "Oro" composed by Željko Joksimović and written by Dejan Ivanović. In March 2008, she won the Serbian national selection, having received the highest number of points from both the jury and televoters. She was awarded as the best interpretation prize by the selection jury. She represented Serbia in Eurovision Song Contest 2008 in Belgrade and came sixth.

Her debut album Panta rei successfully released in October 2008. Including 15 tracks, most composed by Željko Joksimović.

In 2009, Jelena recorded a trio song dedicated to peace, with the participants of Eurovision 2008, Boaz Mauda (Israel) and Sirusho (Armenia). The song is called "Time To Pray" and the lyricist is the president of Israel, Shimon Peres. The song premiered in Serbia during the Serbian National Final of Eurovision 2009, also presented in Armenia and Israel that same year.

In memoriam music collection "Toše i prijatelji" in 2010, Jelena Tomašević taking part with song "Gde da odem da te ne volim" composed by Toše Proeski. The summer of that year she filmed her spot in Ibiza and toured Yugoslavia as guest at Joksimović's concerts.

In 2011, Jelena traveled to Canada and US for two traditional theme concerts. Unfortunately she appeared only in Toronto, because of a problem with her visa when she arrived in Chicago.

After a small pause because of her wedding and her daughter's birth, on February 24, 2012, Jelena released at the TV Show Ja imam talenat, song "Melanholija". The composer is Rafael Artesero from Spain and lyrics writer Ljiljana Jorgovanović. The following year, on June 23, she released her second single "Vertigo" from her upcoming album. Her acquaintance Emina Jahović is the composer and lyrics writer.

Same year, on October 5, 2013, Jelena traveled to Barcelona, where invited from OGAE Spain to sing for Eurovision fans. Also, there she filmed her video clip for the song "Radio svira za nas", which realised on November 26, 2013. The composer is Darko Dimitrov and lyrics writer Aleksandra Milutinović.

Exactly one year later, this time OGAE Portugal asked Jelena as a guest star at their ESC party. Jelena competed in two concerts at Setubal with great Portuguese artists.

On December 6, 2014, Jelena finished her records for her second studio album. On 29. May 2015 she released one more single, called "Ime moje". One month later her homonym album (cc "Ime moje") is out, expect new songs, including her last three years singles and some old songs that never released on an album. She used to say that this album is full of songs given to her as presents from good friends and colleges.

From 2014 to 2018 she appeared as a judge in the Serbian children's talent show Pinkove zvezdice.

On 24 December 2023, she appeared on the Macedonian TV show Eden na Eden where she discussed different aspects of her music career and influences, compared collaborations with Joksimović, Dimitrov and Boccelli.

=== 2026 projects ===
Tomašević had three concerts scheduled in the first quarter of 2026, including Savabal in Nijmegen, the Netherlands, one at Sava Center together with her husband Ivan on 14 February 2026 and one in Skopje on 8 March 2026 at Macedonian Philharmony.

== Theatre appearance ==
On 2012, Jelena took part at the musical "Beli ždralovi" held in Belgrade. It's based on the Soviet movie "The cranes are flying". In 2015, Belarusian president Alexander Lukashenko invited this musical performance to Minsk on May 5, 2015, the celebration day of victory against Nazis. The director is the Serbian actress Ivana Žigon.

== Personal life ==
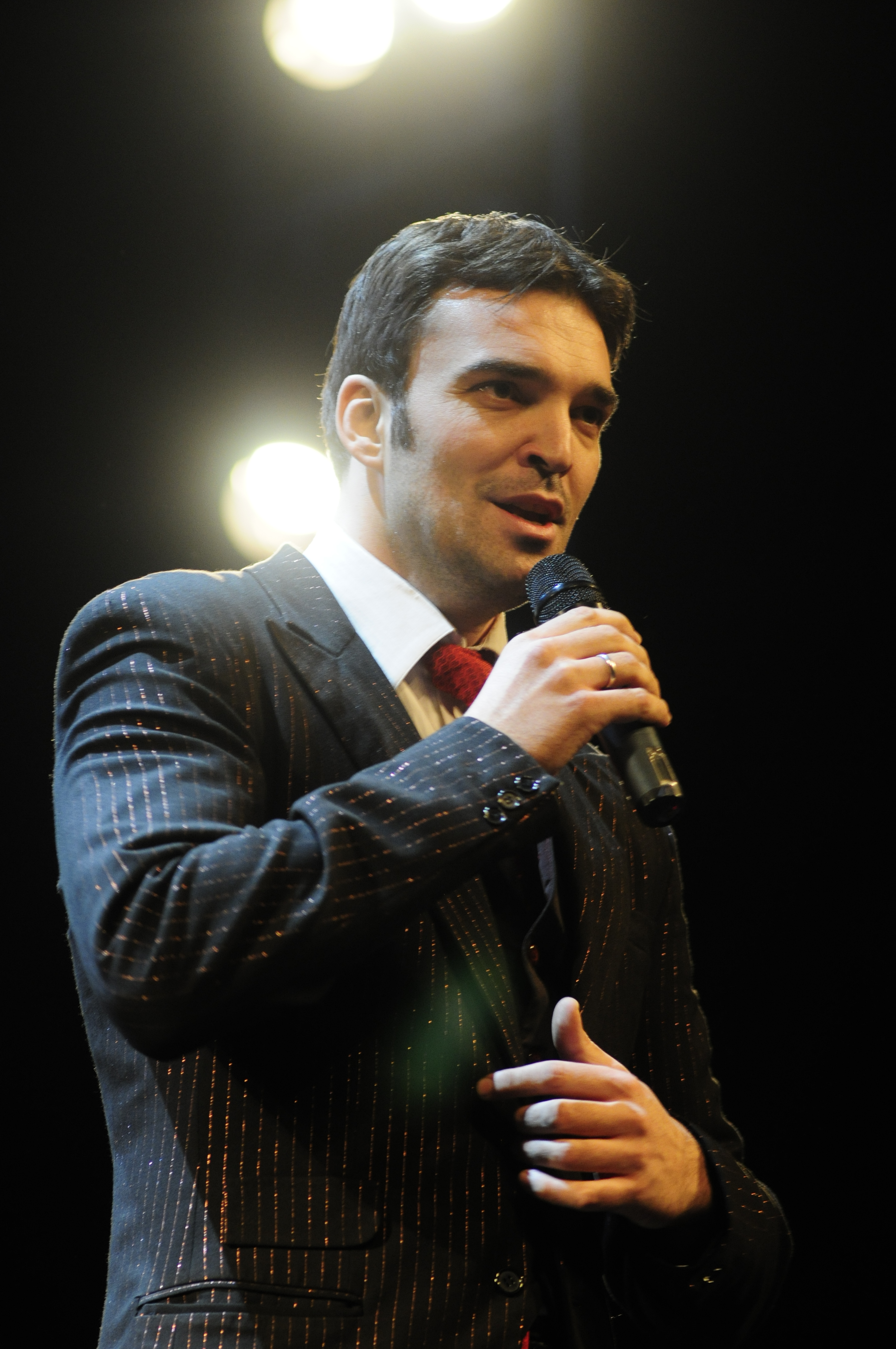
Ivan Bosiljčić was introduced to the world of singing by Jelena Tomašević

Jelena completed her elementary and secondary education (gymnasium) in Kragujevac in 2002. That year, she began studying English at the University of Kragujevac. She is fluent in English and has proficiency in Macedonian.

Jelena met Serbian actor Ivan Bosiljčić at folklore plays. Their friendship turned into a love relationship during the filming of a humanitarian video in 2007. On August 28, 2011, the two got married; and on January 24, 2012, they had a daughter named Nina. Ivan proposed to Jelena in 2011 in London at the St James's Park even though the two agreed they would skip their engagement. Their wedding was attended by 1500 people. The two are known as the most harmonious Serbian public pair whose relationship is based on mutual respect and understanding. On 15 January 2026, Tomašević shared a very personal birthday message to Bosiljčić on her Instagram account, which caught wide media attention in the Yugoslav region.

During the Goca Tržan show, Ivan Bošiljčić praised Tomašević for "saving their house by playing the traditional role a woman plays".

When asked about whether she would forgive her partner infidelity, she said the following: "I would never say never. Everytime when I said that I would never do something in life, it happened that I did exactly that. How do I put it, I am Christian and I am taught to forgive, which I would do in case it comes to such a situation, but I believe it will not happen." The two sat for a 15-minute interview with Serbian media outlet ALO.RS where they discussed their marriage in the midst of the worldwide political crisis in 2026. The two had also previously discussed the concept of success through their projects, sharing the following: "One success does not mean two successes, does not mean three successes. One success can be up, the next project can be completely down. That needs to be withstood. If you become too prideful and if you take wins with a lot of admiration, I am not saying that one should not rejoice, one should rejoice, but if you become too conceited along the way, you will take the fall in a much more difficult way."

On 2 March 2026, Jelena Tomašević had a health problem during a concert in the Montenegrin city of Bar. She lost composure after the first song and had to be transferred immediately to the hospital. She thanked all fans for their wishes through social media and was returned to her house in the city of Belgrade. She also shared how she was diagnosed with vertigo and promised to sing about the sun and the sea in the future.

== Discography ==
=== Albums ===
Year	Information
2008	Panta rei: First studio album; Released: October 2008; Label: Minacord; Format: CD

Year	Information
2015	Ime moje: Second studio album; Released: June 2015; Label: City Records; Format: CD

Year	Information
2024	Iskrena: Third studio album; Released: May 2024; Label: City Records; Format: CD

=== Singles ===
Year	Single	Album	Notes
2004	"Kad ne bude tvoje ljubavi"	Ime moje	Entry for Evropesma 2004
2005	"Jutro"	Panta rei	Beovizija 2005, Evropesma 2005, composed by Željko Joksimović
2006	"Nema koga"	Panta rei	From the film Ivkova slava
2008	"Oro"	Panta rei	Winner of Beovizija 2008, came sixth in Eurovision 2008 for the host nation Serbia
2008	"Košava"	Panta rei	
2008	"Okeani"	Panta rei	
2008	Nikola Tesla	Balkan Routes Vol.1: Nikola Tesla	Vocal appearance
2009	"Time to Pray"	Time to Pray – Single	Vocal appearance with Sirusho and Boaz
2010	"Gde da odem da te ne volim"	Toše i prijatelji & Ime moje	A song composed by Macedonian superstar, performed in his honour
2013	"Melanholija"	Melanholija – Single / Ime moje	A song composed by Spanish Rafael Artesero
2013	"Vertigo"	Vertigo – Single / Ime moje	A song written and composed by Emina Jahović Sandal
2013	"Radio Svira Za Nas"	Radio Svira Za Nas – Single / Ime moje	A song composed by Macedonian Darko Dimitrov
2015	"Ime Moje"	Ime Moje – Single / Ime moje	A song composed by Aleksandra Milutinović & Goran Kovačić
2018	"Dobro jutro ljubavi"	Dobro jutro ljubavi – Single / Iskrena	A song composed by Amil Lojo
2019	"Suncokret"	Suncokret – Single / Iskrena	A song composed by Aleksandra Milutinović
2020	"Diraj mi usne"	Diraj mi usne – Single / Iskrena	A song composed by Goran Kovačić
2021	"Sve ispočetka"	Sve ispočetka – Single / Iskrena	A song composed by Leontina Vukomanović
2021	"Ne žalim"	Ne žalim – Single / Iskrena	A song composed by Macedonian Darko Dimitrov
2023	"Rano moja mila"	Rano moja mila – Single / Iskrena	A song composed by Goran Kovačić
2024	"Veruj mi da verujem"	Iskrena	Winner of Beogradsko proleće 2024, composed by Aleksandra Milutinović

== Notes ==
Awards and achievements
Preceded by Marija Šerifović with Molitva	Serbia in the Eurovision Song Contest (with Bora Dugić); 2008	Succeeded by Marko Kon and Milaan with Cipela
Preceded by Negative	Beovizija winner 2005	Succeeded by Flamingosi feat Louis
