= Flamingosi =

Music act

Flamingosi (Serbian Cyrillic: Фламингоси) were a popular Serbian-Montenegrin duo consisting of the Serbian TV presenter Ognjen Amidžić (a.k.a. Renato) and actor Marinko Madžgalj (a.k.a. Valentino). The group was founded in the summer of 2005. Their style was a mix of typical Serbian folk, rock and jazz. They became a big hit that year, in turn gaining mass popularity. Together with the folk jazz singer Louis they were the favorites to win the national pre-selection for the Eurovision Song Contest 2006, Evropesma with their song Ludi letnji ples (Crazy Summer Dance), however due to a dispute over the voting process, they came second, eventually Serbia and Montenegro having to pull out of the Eurovision Song Contest 2006.

The frontman of the group, Marinko Madžgalj died of pancreatic cancer on March 26, 2016, in Belgrade. With his death, the group ceased to exist.

== Discography ==
- Razum i osećajnost, 2005
- Gordost i predrasude, 2006
- Prljavi igrači, 2011
- Seti se našeg zaveta [A strana], 2011
- Seti se našeg zaveta [B strana], 2014

Awards and achievements
Preceded by Jelena Tomašević	Beovizija winner with Louis; 2006	Succeeded by Marija Šerifović
