= Kaja (singer) =

Vesna Milačić (Serbian Cyrillic: Весна Милачић), known as Kaja, is a Montenegrin singer-songwriter.

== Biography ==
She was born on June 8, 1968, in Karaburma, a suburb of Belgrade.

She was a former member of the rock band Crveno i Crno. She debuted as a lyricist in 1999, on Kotor Music Festival, where she performed her song "Sad mogu da ti kažem sve" in a duet with Igor Perazić. Kaja decided to write songs for other performers after she wrote the lyrics to Bojan Marović's song "Više Te Nema", that won the second place on Sunčane Skale festival in 2002.

She is married and has two children.

From 2009 to 2010, she worked on national television on "Saturdays night" show with Dusica Vugdelic.
