= Beovizija =

Serbian music festival

- Беовизија
- Created by: RTS
- Country of origin: Serbia
- Original language: Serbian

Production
- Production locations: Sava Centar, Belgrade, Serbia; RTS Studio 6, Košutnjak, Belgrade, Serbia

Original release
- Release: 2003 – 2009; 2018 – 2020

Beovizija (Serbian: Беовизија) was a music festival established in 2003. Since 2007 it was the national selection for Serbia's representative at the Eurovision Song Contest. Beovizija was organised and broadcast live each year by RTS1, on RTRS in Bosnia, and internationally on Eurovision.tv and RTS SAT as of 2008. It was held during February and March at Belgrade's Sava Centar, and in RTS studios in 2019 and 2020.

The competition started in 2004 and was annually one of the most watched entertainment events in Serbia. In December 2009, RTS announced that it is changing the way it will select its Eurovision competitor and has thus cancelled Beovizija. However, on January 19, 2018, RTS confirmed the return of Beovizija as a national selection for the Serbian entry in the Eurovision Song Contest 2018, and it has been used until 2020. After not being held in 2021, it was due to be held in 2022 as a song contest unrelated to Eurovision, but it was eventually cancelled.

== History ==
Serbia and Montenegro were originally due to enter the Eurovision Song Contest for the first time in 2003 since an 11-year expulsion. The expulsion was brought about the break out of wars in the former Yugoslavia under which Serbia and Montenegro participated for the last time in 1992. Unfortunately, the EBU stated that too many countries wanted to enter in that year and so some would be forced to withdraw. Serbia and Montenegro (who participated as one country at the time) was one of them. As a result, Serbia and Montenegro entered the following year instead.

Originally the festival was supposed to commence in 2004 and was to be the country's selection for Eurovision however later Radio Television of Montenegro expressed the wish for a united festival in determining the country's contender at the European event. It was decided that Beovizija would be Serbia's semi final while Montevizija (held in Podgorica) would be Montenegro's semi-final. The best from the two would compete in a united final show contest under the name Evropesma/Europjesma.

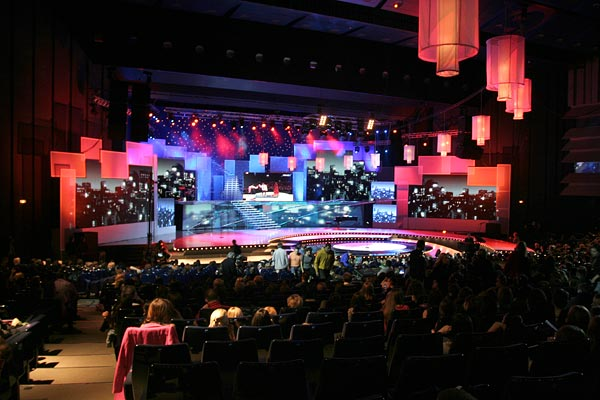
2008 Beovizija stage

Beovizija logo used from 2003 to 2009.

The first Beovizija was held a year before Serbia and Montenegro entered Eurovision and was more of an awards night for the Serbian music industry. In 2003 and 2004 28 songs competed while 25 were allowed to compete in 2005 and 2006. From 2004 - 2006 there were 8 jury members, from 2007 there have been only 3 members of the jury for both the semi-final and final night, while since 2018, 5 jurors vote in every show. In 2004–2006, each juror awarded a set of 12,10,8,7...1 points, with the televote awarding the 9th set of points. From 2007 till today, votes of all jurors are converted into a single set of points, with the televoting awarding another set of points, making it a 50% jury 50% televoting system.

In 2006 Serbia and Montenegro peacefully split after a referendum. Serbia became an independent country and thus Beovizija became the national selection for the Eurovision Song Contest. The country debuted for the first time independently in 2007. Marija Šerifović - Serbia's representative won Eurovision that year.

Beovizija was held over two nights in February. The semi-final consisted of 20 songs. The public's and jury's vote was combined to determine the 10 best songs to proceed to the final. Similarly, the winner of Beovizija was determined. The Serbian music industry awards were handed out on the final night of Beovizija. In 2018, only one show was hosted. Since 2019, Beovizija is held over 3 nights (2 semi-finals and a final), with 12 acts performing each night. 6 acts qualify from each semi-final, amounting to 12 finalists.

In 2008 the semi-final were to be held on February 19, 2008, while the final a day later. However, due to the declaration of independence on behalf of Kosovo, the festival was delayed until March 9 when the semi-final took place and the finals which took place on March 10.

In December 2009, RTS announced that it is changing the way it will select its Eurovision competitor and has thus cancelled Beovizija.

On January 19, 2018, RTS officially confirmed the return of Beovizija as a national selection event for the Serbian entry in the Eurovision Song Contest 2018, and has been used until 2020.

=== Host couples ===
Past presenters
Year	Name
2003	Feđa Stojanović; Katarina Rebrača; Milica Gacin
2004	Aleksandar Srećković; Ksenija Balaban
2005	Boda Ninković; Jelena Jovičić
2006	Boda Ninković; Jelena Jovičić
2007	Boda Ninković; Jelena Jovičić
2008	Đorđe Maričić; Branislav Katić; Nina Radulović; Kristina Radenković
2009	Jovana Janković
2018	Dragana Kosjerina; Kristina Radenković; Branko Veselinović; Aleksandar Stojanović
2019	Dragana Kosjerina; Ana Babić; Ivan Mihailović; Nebojša Milovanović; Kristina Radenković; Bojana Marković
2020	Dragana Kosjerina; Kristina Radenković; Jovan Radomir; Stefan Popović

== Format ==
The basic format of the contest since 2004 was that there were approximately twenty singers. Each sing their song once. There is then a ten-minute interval where the viewers are encouraged to SMS and phone in the name of their favourite song. The public vote is incorporated in the special jury's vote. The singer with the most votes wins the contest.

In 2007 the format of the show changed. Beovizija was held over two nights. On the first night there were twenty singers hoping to go into the final of Beovizija held two days later. Ten singers that had the biggest public and jury vote when they were combined would pass to the finals. At the final of Beovizija they once again sing their song. There is then a ten-minute interval where the viewers are encouraged to SMS and phone in the name of their favourite song. During the interval, Serbian industry music awards are handed out. The points from the public vote and the jury's vote are then revealed. The singer with the most points wins the contest and represents Serbia in the Eurovision Song Contest.

In 2007, 2008 and 2009 the singers from Bosnia and Herzegovina, Croatia, the Republic of Macedonia, Montenegro and Slovenia that were selected to represent their countries at that year's Eurovision appeared on stage at Beovizija to sing their songs. All performers received a warm welcome from the audience.

== Past Beovizija winners ==
Past winners
Year	Performer	Song	Points awarded
2003	Toše Proeski	"Čija si"	75
2004	Negative	"Zbunjena"	79
2005	Jelena Tomašević	"Jutro"	78
2006	Flamingosi featuring Louis	"Ludi letnji ples"	94
2007	Marija Šerifović	"Molitva"	22
2008	Jelena Tomašević	"Oro"	24
2009	Marko Kon & Milan Nikolić	"Cipela"	19
2018	Sanja Ilić & Balkanika	"Nova deca"	24
2019	Nevena Božović	"Kruna"	20
2020	Hurricane	"Hasta la vista"	24

== Eurovision Song Contest results ==
Year	Song	Artist(s)	Composer(s)	Lyricist(s)	Points	Place
2007	"Molitva"	Marija Šerifović	Vladimir Graić	Saša Milošević Mare	268	1st
2008	"Oro"	Jelena Tomašević	Željko Joksimović	Dejan Ivanović	160	6th
2009	"Cipela"	Marko Kon & Milan Nikolić	Aleksandar Kobac, Marko Kon, Milan Nikolić	Aleksandar Kobac, Marko Kon	60 (SF)	10th (SF)
2018	"Nova Deca"	Sanja Ilić & Balkanika	Aleksandar Sanja Ilić	Aleksandar Sanja Ilić	113	19th
2019	"Kruna"	Nevena Božović	Nevena Božović	Nevena Božović	89	18th
2020	"Hasta la vista"	Hurricane	Nemanja Antonić	Kosana Stojić, Sanja Vučić	Contest cancelled	
