= Tijana Dapčević =

Macedonian and Serbian singer (born 1976)

Tijana Dapčević Тијана Дапчевиќ
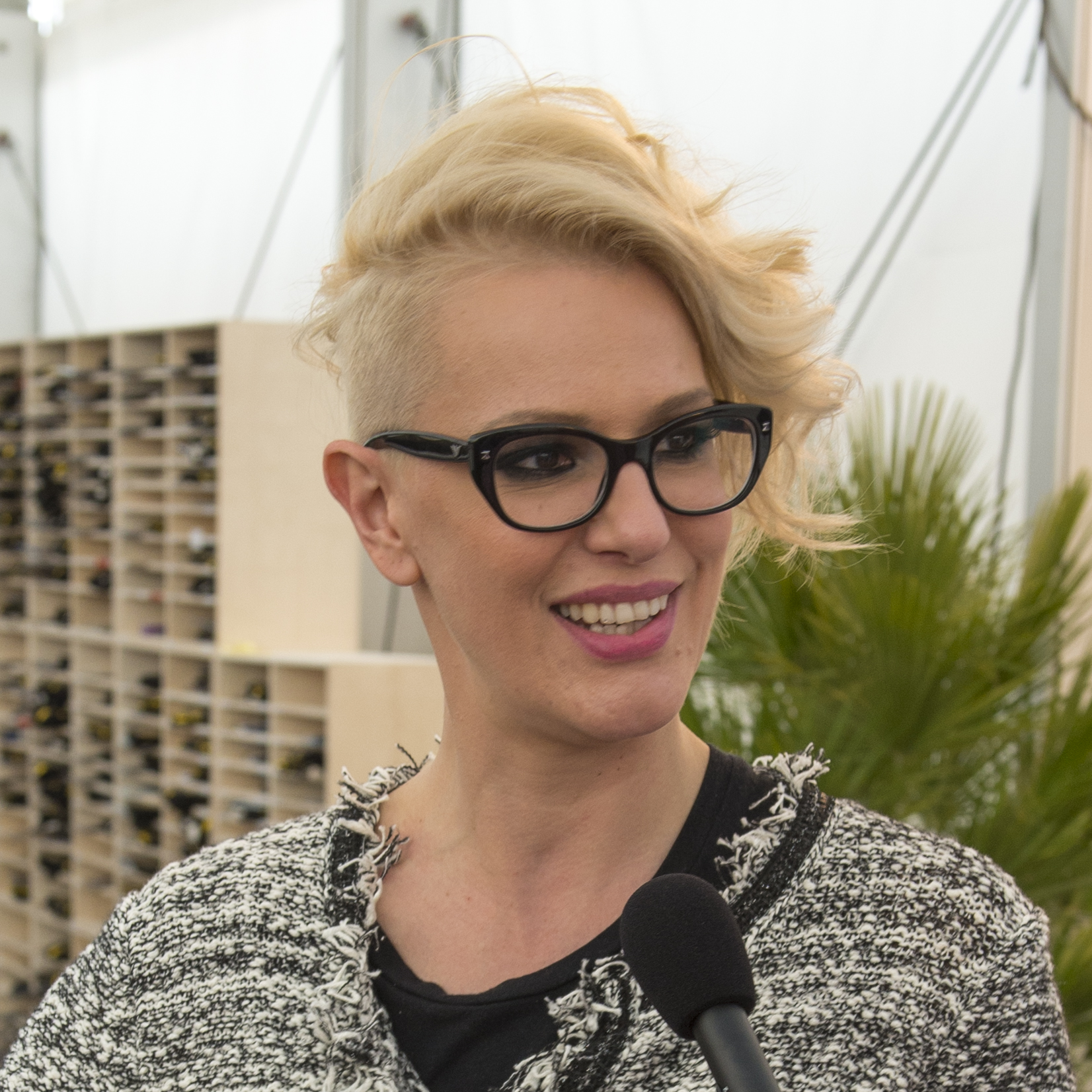
- Dapčević in 2014

Background information
- Also known as: Tijana
- Born: Tijana Todevska; 3 February 1976 (age 50); Skopje, SR Macedonia, Yugoslavia
- Genres: Pop
- Occupation: Singer
- Years active: 1999–present
- Spouse: Milan Dapčević (m. 2001)
- Website: tijanadapcevic.info

Tijana Dapčević (née Todevska; Macedonian: Тијана Дапчевиќ, née Тодевска, Serbian Cyrillic: Тијана Дапчевић, née Тодевска, pronounced [tǐjana dâptʃeʋitɕ]; born 3 February 1976) is a Macedonian and Serbian singer. In addition to her music career, Dapčević has also launched a career in acting.

She played the character of German-Macedonian Ula Buzalevska, one of the leading roles in Macedonian TV show Prespav in the period between 2017 and 2024.

== Early life ==
Todevska was born in Skopje, at the time part of SFR Yugoslavia, to a Macedonian father Velko Todevski, a music teacher and a Bosnian Serb mother Brana, an opera singer. Her parents studied in Sarajevo, where they met. She has a younger sister Tamara, and is married to Milan Dapčević, a Serbian businessman.

== Career ==
One of her hit songs is "Sve je isto, samo njega nema" (Everything Is the Same, Only He Is Gone) (2005), "he" being former President of Yugoslavia Josip Broz Tito. Dragan Brajović Braja wrote the lyrics and the music. The song is intended as a parody as it makes fun of the different nations that emerged from Yugoslavia. It contains verses in six different languages representing the respective mentalities: Bosnian, Croatian, Montenegrin, Macedonian, Slovene and Serbian. It additionally shared the stereotypical views of people speaking those languages, such as a Bosnian mocking an LGBTQIA+ person for wearing a bra and a Croat being negatively surprised by turbo folk songs played at every party. According to Tošić from Bosnian newspaper Express, the song was a reason for division between Yugonostalgics and capitalists. The music video opens with the singer pledging a Communist allegiance to her leader wearing a typical hat as she poses with a red star behind her. She then proceeds to serve as the news anchor for each respective country, reading from a piece of paper in front of a screen. During the bridge, a violin player appears, playing the instrument.

She won the Sunčane Skale Festival in Herceg Novi in 2002 with the song "Negativ" (Negative), composed by Darko Dimitrov and included on her eponymous second studio album. She has also won first place on the Serbian Radio Festival-Feras in 2006 with the song "Julijana" (Juliana).

In 2004, Dapčević provided vocals for "Kiša" (Rain), a song by Serbian rapper Dalibor Andonov Gru. Andonov and Dapčević recorded it as a rendition of the track "Kiša", which was originally released on Andonov's 2003 album Beograd (Belgrade). In contrast to the original song, which included solely elements of hip hop, the 2004 rework included motives previously seen in Dapčević's earlier work, dedicated more to pop music.

At the 2006 Evropesma, Tijana was placed in eighth place receiving 27 points with the song "Greh" (Sin). The song was included on her next album Žute minute, which was released in the summer of 2007.

Tijana Dapčević presenting herself, 2014.

On 28 August 2013, Tijana Dapčević was selected by Macedonian Radio Television to represent Macedonia at the Eurovision Song Contest 2014 in Denmark. Dapčević competed in the second semi-final of the competition on 8 May 2014 with the song "To the Sky". Dapčević placed 13th in the second semi-final with 33 points and did not progress to the final. Tijana's younger sister Tamara has participated in Eurovision Song Contest 2008 and 2019, and was a backing vocalist for Tijana in 2014.

== Covers ==
Some of her songs have been covered in numerous other languages, such as "Sve je isto, samo njega nema" in Polish as Natasza Urbańska's "Mała" (2009) and "Pogrešan čovek" in Croatian as Lidija Bačić's "Krivi čovjek" (2014).

== Discography ==
- Kao da... (2001)
- Negativ (2002)
- Zemlja mojih snova (2004)
- Žuta minuta (2007)
- Muzika (2010)

== Sources ==
- "Biografija: Tijana Dapčević". Story.
- Tijana Dapčević, BN Televizija, archived from the original on 13 April 2017

Awards and achievements
Preceded by Ivana Banfić	Sunčane Skale winner 2002	Succeeded by Bojan Marović
Preceded by Marija Šerifović	Music Festival Budva winner 2005	Succeeded by Incanto
Preceded by N/A	Plesom do snova winner Season 1 (2007 with Vojislav Kaluđerović)	Succeeded by Ognjen Amidžić & Dragana Krdu
Preceded by Vlatko Lozanoski & Esma Redžepova with "Pred da se razdeni"	Macedonia in the Eurovision Song Contest; 2014	Succeeded by Daniel Kajmakoski with "Autumn Leaves"
