= Milena Vučić =

Montenegrin singer (born 1986)

Milena Vučić Милена Вучић
- Born: 11 November 1986 (age 39); Titograd, Montenegro, SFR Yugoslavia (now Podgorica, Montenegro)
- Genres: Pop rock
- Occupation: Singer
- Years active: 2004–present
- Labels: City Records; Campus

Milena Vučić (Serbian Cyrillic: Милена Вучић; born 11 November 1986) is a Montenegrin pop rock singer.

== Career ==
Vučić started her musical career in the female band Negre. At Evropesma-Europjesma 2004, they received 46 points with the song "K'o nijedna druga". Her solo career began in 2006 with the competition at Montevizija, where she finished in eighth place with the song "Živa sam". She won the 2007 Sunčane Skale with the song "Da l' ona zna", which became a big hit. Other hits include "Luče" and "Indijana". Vučić competed in Montesong 2024 with the song "Škorpija". The song placed sixth overall in the final.

== Personal life ==
Since 11 November 2012, Vučić has been married to singer and producer Nikola Burovac. At the beginning of March 2021, they had a daughter, Sara.

== Discography ==
=== Studio albums ===
- Da l’ ona zna (2007)

=== EPs ===
- Milena (2015)

=== Singles ===
- "Škorpija" (2024)

== Awards and nominations ==
Year	Award	Category	Nominee(s)	Result	Ref.
2007	Montefon Awards	Female Pop Singer of the Year	Herself	Won	
2007	Montefon Awards	Video of the Year	"Luče"	Won	
