= Lane moje =

2004 single by Željko Joksimović

Single by Željko Joksimović
- Released: 2004
- Songwriters: Željko Joksimović; Leontina Vukomanović

Eurovision Song Contest 2004 entry
- Country: Serbia and Montenegro
- Artist: Željko Joksimović
- With: Ad Hoc Orchestra
- Language: Serbian
- Composer: Željko Joksimović
- Lyricist: Leontina Vukomanović

Finals performance
- Semi-final result: 1st
- Semi-final points: 263
- Final result: 2nd
- Final points: 263

Entry chronology
- "Zauvijek moja" (2005) ►

"Lane moje" (Serbian Cyrillic: Лане моје, pronounced [lâne mǒje]; literally "My Fawn", figuratively "My Darling") is a song by Serbian musician Željko Joksimović. It was written for the Eurovision Song Contest 2004, in representation of Serbia and Montenegro, in which it finished second. Inspired by traditional Serbian music (also called ethno), in the style of a ballad, it won in the semi-finals but ultimately lost closely to Ukraine's "Wild Dances", finishing second by scoring 263 points, becoming the first non-winning song in the contest, along with Greece's entry "Shake It", to score over 200 points. The song set a trend of world music strategy in the competition by the former Yugoslav republics.

The song has become popular amongst many Eurovision fans and it is often rated as one of the best non-winning songs.

Joksimović went on to compose Bosnia's 2006 entry, Serbia's 2008 entry, to host the 2008 Contest, to perform Serbia's 2012 entry and to compose Montenegro's 2015 entry.

== Track list ==
1. "Lane moje"
2. "Good bye"
3. "Lane moje (Instrumental version)"
4. "Lane moje (Eastern mix by Alek)"
5. "Lane moje (Trancefusion mix by Dream Team)"

== Charts ==
Chart (2004)	Peak position
Greek Single Charts	24
