= Luna (1990s Serbian band) =

Serbian pop group

Luna (Serbian: Луна) is a popular band from Serbia with considerable popularity throughout the former Yugoslavia. The key group member is multi-instrumentalist and composer Čeda-Čedomir Čvorak–Rajičić. They released ten studio albums.

Luna have been recording albums since the late 1990s – songs include Drugarice (/You/ Girlfriend(s)) sung with Svetlana Ražnatović (Ceca), Ne ostavljaj me (Don't leave me), sung with Galina-Gloria Ivanova–Peneva etc. /One song was originally released by Luna in a year 1999.; its tone is an imitating melody of a song This Corrosion, performed by TSOF./

Maja Marković is first singer of the group, not leaving from year 1997. towards 2006. when Kristina Čanković (who was the group's lead singer: 2007.–2009.) become the frontwoman. Notable songs sung by latter are Ulica uzdaha and Jako, jako (2007.), Ulica uzdaha is a duet-collaboration with distinguished Bosnian singer Halid Bešlić.

In a year 2009., Zejna Murkić and Lidija Jadžić joined the group; two albums were recorded.

In a year 2010., Čvorak–Rajičić announced that he would stop working with Murkić and would work only with Jadžić in the near future. Ivana Krunić joined the group shortly after this statement .

City records records songs of the band.

== Albums ==
- Samo svoja (1998)
- Ti i ja možemo sve (1999)
- Godine lete ... godine lude (2001)
- I u dobru i u zlu (2002)
- Milion dolara (2004)
- Bez maske do daske (2005)
- Ulica uzdaha (2007)
- Da san ne prestane (2009)
- Sex On The Beach (2010)
- Luna 10 (2012)
- 011 (2014)
- Zodijak (2017)
- Karma (2019)

The albums from 1998 to 2005 where recorded with Maja Marković, the album from 2007 with Kristina Čanković and the two from 2009 to 2010 with Zejna Murkić and Lidija Jadžić.

== Members ==
- Čeda Čvorak, songwriter
- Maja Marković, vocals (1996–2006)
- Šarvari Saša, drummer (2001–2006)
- Jelena Kovačević, vocals (2006–2007)
- Kristina Čanković, vocals (2007–2009)
- Zеjna Murkić & Lidija Jadžić, vocals (2009–2010)
- Ivana Krunić & Lidija Jadžić, vocals (2010–2017)
- Teodora Mijušković, vocals (2017–2020)
- Dunja Flash, vocals (2021)
