= Romana Panić =

Romana Романа Панић
- Born: Romana Panić; 9 April 1975 (age 50); Banja Luka, SR Bosnia and Herzegovina, SFR Yugoslavia
- Genres: Pop; pop-folk; Europop
- Occupation: Singer
- Labels: City Records; IDJTunes

Romana Panić (Serbo-Croatian Cyrillic: Романа Панић; born 9 April 1975), better known just as Romana, is a Bosnian-Serbian singer. Arguably best known for her song "Samoodbrana", she saw most success in the early 2000s. Romana also took victory at the 2004 Sunčane Skale music festival in Herceg Novi, Montenegro.

Additionally, she was a contestant on the fifth season of reality TV show Farma (2013), finishing in fifth place.

In June 2020, Panić was arrested in Brisbane, Australia for committing credit card fraud and was sentenced to twelve months in prison.

== Discography ==
Studio albums

- Lažem (1999)
- Venera (2001)
- Ne! (2004)
- Dragi (2009)
- Krećem (2011)

Awards and achievements
| Preceded by Bojan Marović | Sunčane Skale winner 2003 | Succeeded by Goran Karan |
