= Bojan Marović =

Montenegrin singer and actor

- Born: Titograd, SR Montenegro, SFR Yugoslavia
- Genres: Pop
- Occupations: Singer, Actor
- Years active: 2002–present

Bojan Marović (Serbian Cyrillic: Бојан Маровић) is a Montenegrin singer and actor. He is from Podgorica where he resides.

== Biography ==
Bojan was born to parents Darko (1963–2001) and Sanja (1967). On April 7, 2001, his father Darko (1963–2001) died at age 38. On his 18th birthday, his mother, Sanja, Darko's widow, gave him his song "Više te nema", which won him third place in the Sunčane Skale festival. He has a younger brother, Boris, who is Bojan's inspiration, according to an interview.

== Discography ==
=== Studio albums ===
- Zbog tebe... (2004)
- Litar neba (2007)
- Za tebe i mene (2011)

=== Singles ===
- Svaki korak tvoj (Pjesma Mediterana 2010)

== Filmography ==
- Imam nešto važno da vam kažem (2005)

== Awards and nominations ==
Year	Award	Category	Nominee(s)	Result	Ref.
2007	Montefon Awards	Album of the Year	Litar neba	Won	

Awards and achievements
Preceded by Tijana Dapčević	Sunčane Skale winner 2003	Succeeded by Romana Panić
