= Louis (singer) =

Louis Луис
- Born: Ljubiša Stojanović; 25 June 1952; Leskovac, PR Serbia, FPR Yugoslavia
- Died: 31 July 2011 (aged 59) between Feketić–Vrbas, Serbia
- Genres: World, jazz, folk, pop-folk
- Occupations: Singer, songwriter
- Instrument: Vocals
- Years active: 1970–2011

Ljubiša Stojanović (Serbian Cyrillic: Љубиша Стојановић; 25 June 1952 – 31 July 2011), better known by his stage name Louis (Serbian: Луис / Luis), was a Serbian singer. He was known for his unique musical style and was in the music business from 1970 until his death.

== Biography ==
Born in Leskovac, Louis graduated from the music high school in Niš. He got his B.A. in Music from the Faculty of Music in Belgrade, majoring in voice and composing with arrangement and folklore.

His stage name Louis originated from when he was nine and successfully performed Louis Armstrong's songs. He was among the first to combine jazz with Serbia's folklore. In 1982, he recorded his first record titled Ne kuni me, ne ruži me, majko (Do Not Curse me, Do Not Scold Me, Mother), gaining high sales. Together with the Serbian band Flamingosi, he almost won the Beovizija 2006 festival for the Eurovision Song Contest 2006 in Athens, Greece.

At the beginning of 2011, he recorded for the Dutch record label Snail Records the album "The Last King Of Balkans" but just before the release of the album, Louis died in a car accident on 31 July 2011, on the road between Feketić and Vrbas. His last show was on 22 July 2011 at Club Jez in Sarajevo.

== Discography ==
- 1982: Ne kuni me, ne ruži me, majko
- 1984: Dudi, s puno ljubavi
- 1986: Srcem i dušom
- 1987: My way I
- 1987: My way II
- 1988: Evo me opet
- 1990: Hajde da se pomirimo
- 1993: Louis (uživo)
- 1999: Louis
- 2001: Pogled iznutra
- 2005: Čarobnjak
- 2008: Ciganski san
- 2011: The Last King of Balkans [2011 Snail Records]

Awards and achievements
Preceded by Jelena Tomašević	Beovizija winner with Flamingosi; 2006	Succeeded by Marija Šerifović
