= Duška Vučinić =

Serbian journalist

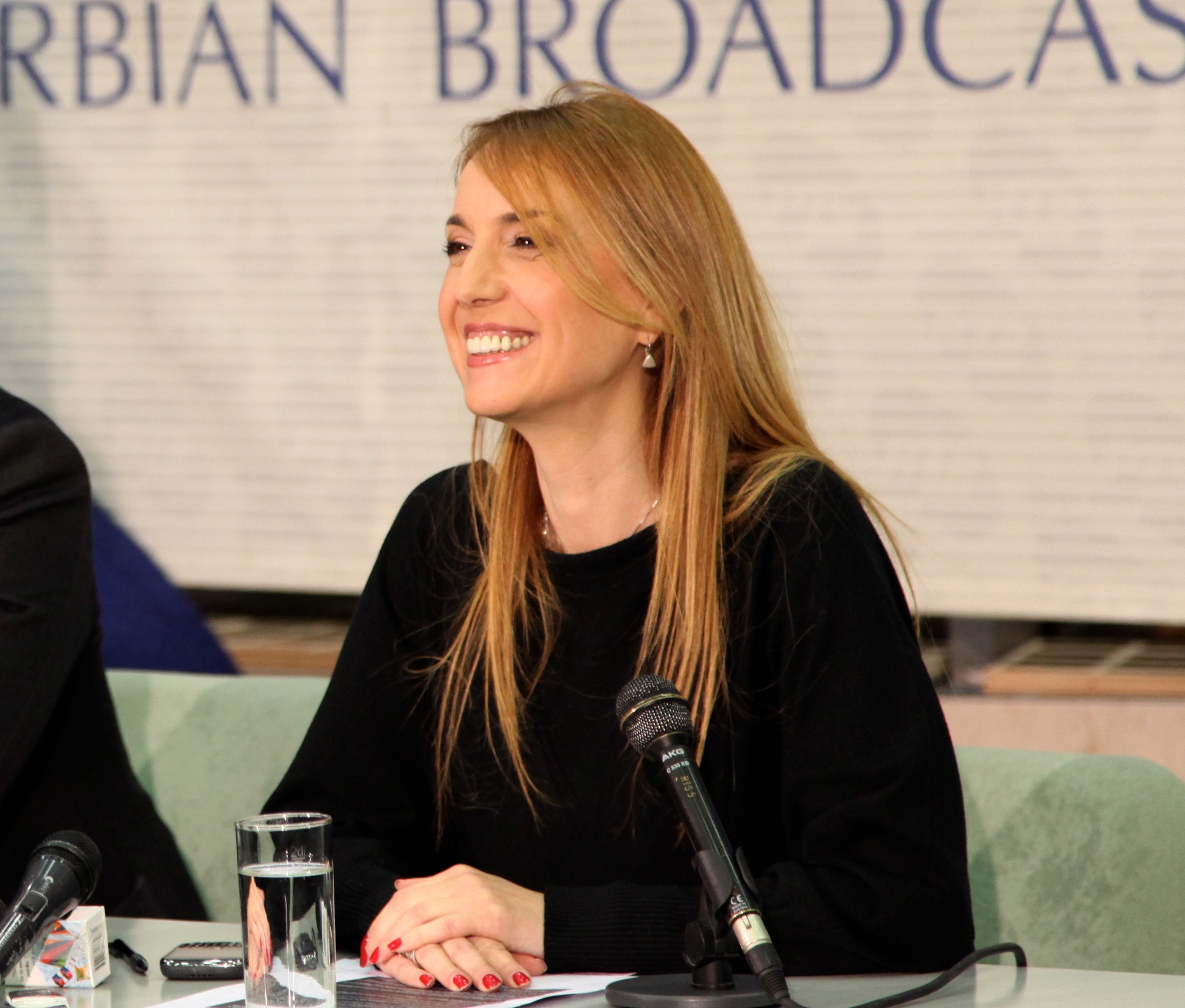
Duška Vučinić in 2012

Duška Vučinić (Serbian: Душка Вучинић) is a Serbian television journalist, presenter, and director who is since 2008, a head of Press and Public Relations at RTS.

Since 2004, she has provided national television commentary for the Eurovision Song Contest on RTS (with the exceptions of the 2008 contest, which Serbia hosted and the 2014 contest, in which Serbia did not participate).
