= Leontina Vukomanović =

Leontina Леонтина
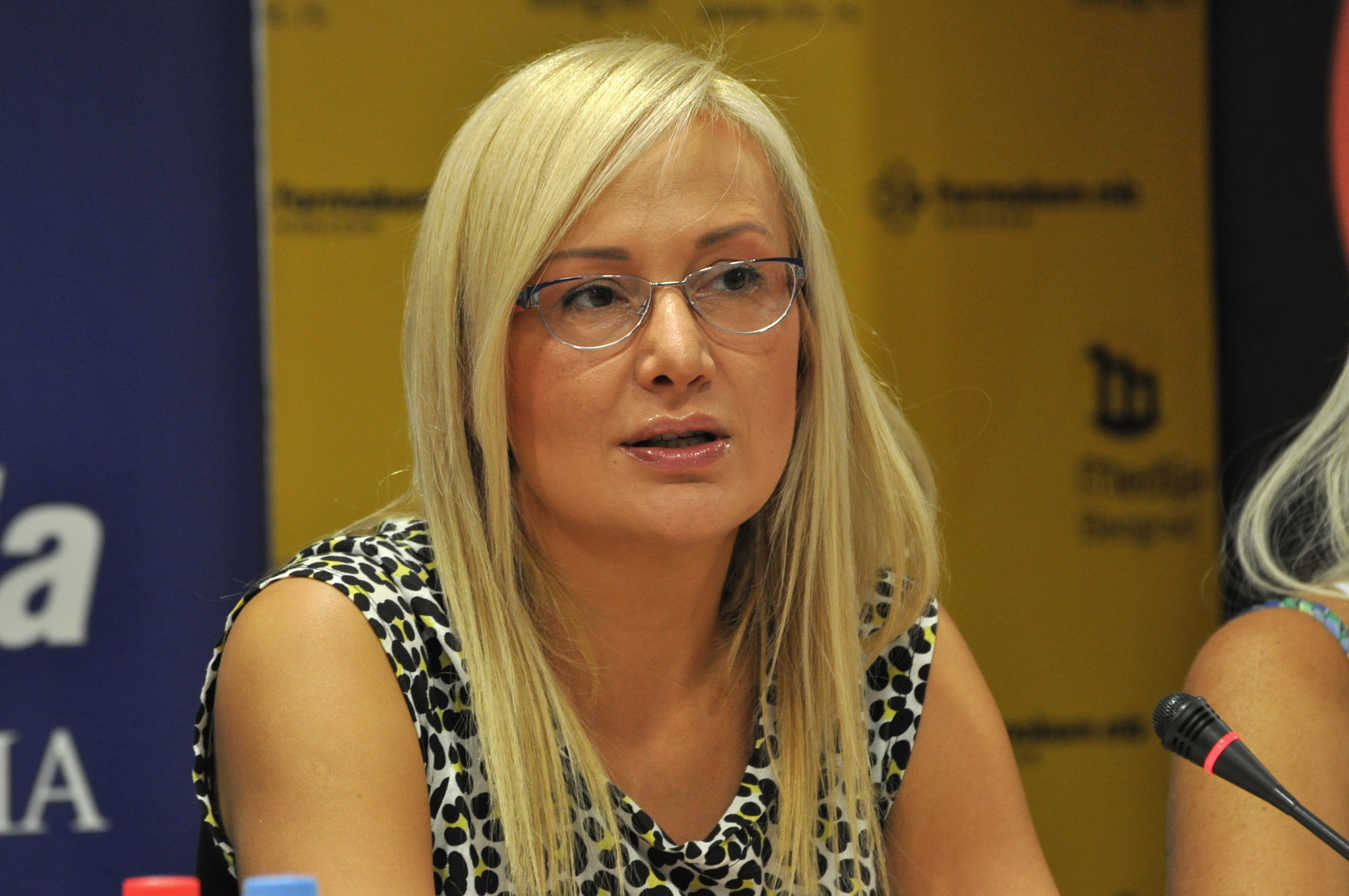

Background information
- Also known as: Leontina Pat
- Born: Leontina Vukomanović; 13 November 1970 (age 55); Požarevac, SR Serbia, SFR Yugoslavia
- Years active: 1991–present
- Labels: City Records, PGP-RTS

Leontina Vukomanović (Serbian Cyrillic: Леонтина Вукомановић; born 13 November 1970), known mononymously as Leontina, is a Serbian singer, blogger, composer and songwriter.

== Biography ==
She started with professional music in school days (secondary music school Josip Slavenski, 1986, when she published her first songs and for whom she entrusted protection to SOKOJ). Parallel to education at the Faculty of Music in Belgrade (1989–1993) she participated as a composer and songwriter in the domestic Eurovision Song Contest '91. and '92. and as a vocal soloist she won awards for interpretation at the festivals Mesam and Belgrade Spring '92. year with his own compositions.

In 2004, she wrote lyrics for song "Lane moje", performed by Serbian musician Željko Joksimović at the Eurovision Song Contest 2004 representing Serbia and Montenegro.

== Discography ==
Studio albums:

- Nemiri (Lucky Sound, GETEX, N-estrada, 1996)
- Ljubav bez ljubavi (City Records, 1998)
- Za decu (PGP-RTS, 1998)
- Sledeća (City Records, 2001)
- Pesme za decu (City Records, 2008) - together with Ivana Peters
