= RTS Svet =

- Country: Serbia
- Broadcast area: Worldwide

Programming
- Language(s): Serbian
- Picture format: 16:9 1080i HDTV

Ownership
- Owner: Radio Television of Serbia

History
- Launched: 14 May 1991; 33 years ago
- Former names: RTB SАТ; RTS SAT

Links
- Website: www.rts.rs

RTS Svet (Serbian Cyrillic: РТС Свет, or RTS World (Serbian: РТС Свет/RTS Svet); Satellite program of RTS (Сателитски програм РТС-а/Satelitski program RTS-a)), formerly RTS Sat, is a Serbian satellite television channel. It is operated by Radio Television of Serbia (RTS).

== Audience ==
The channel is aimed at Serbs living abroad.

== History ==
The channel was banned by the satellite provider Eutelsat during the NATO conflict with Serbia in 1999.
