= Udruženje javnih radija i televizija =

National public broadcaster of FR Yugoslavia as well as Serbia and Montenegro

Alliance of Public Radio and Television Udruženje javnih radija i televizija
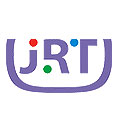
- Official logo (2006)

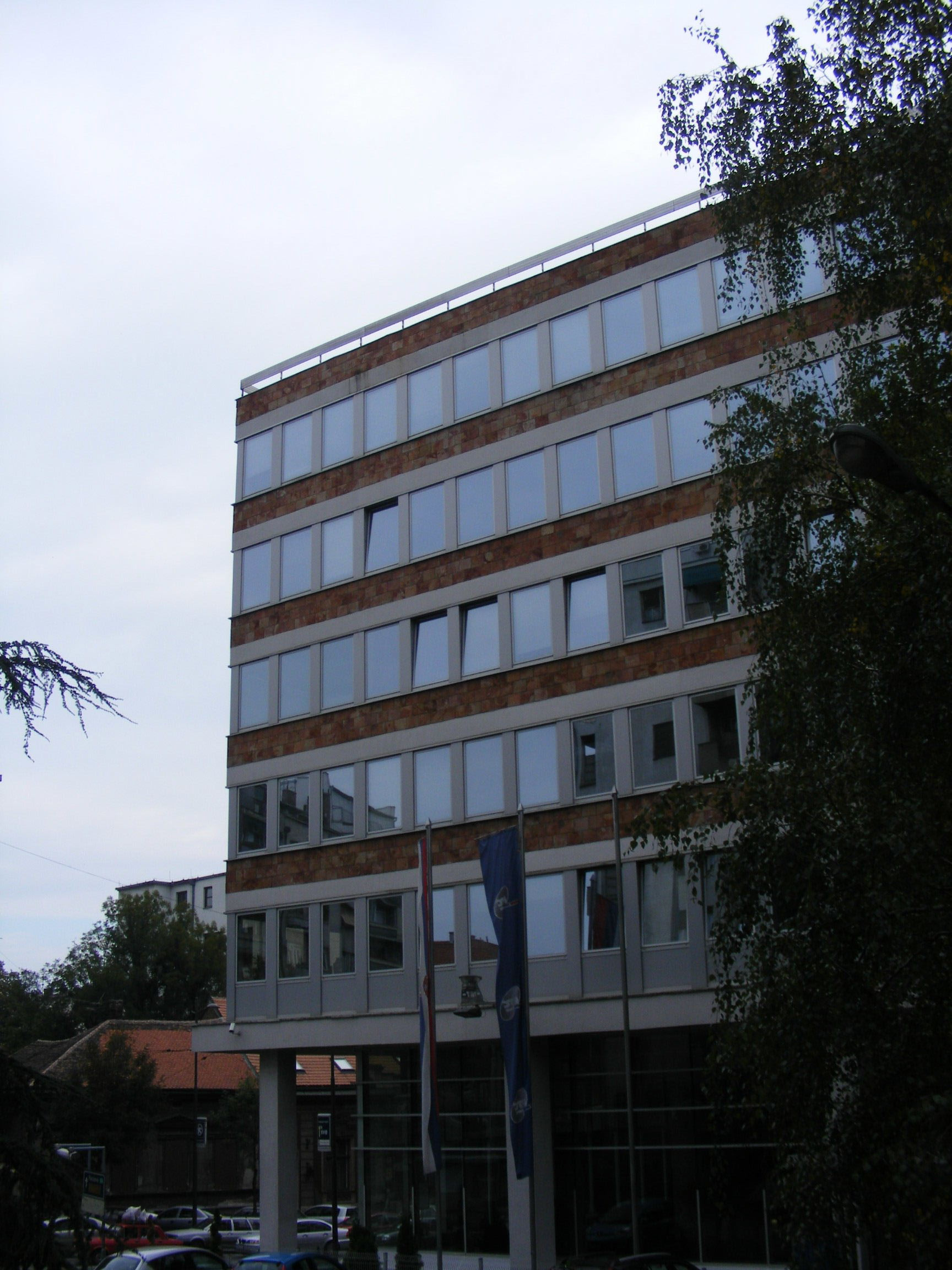
- UJRT Headquarters in Belgrade (2007)
- Type: Broadcast radio and television
- Country: Serbia and Montenegro
- Availability: National; International
- Founded: 2001
- Headquarters: Takovska 10, Belgrade
- Broadcast area: Serbia and Montenegro
- Owner: Government of Serbia and Montenegro
- Launch date: 2001
- Dissolved: 2006
- Affiliation: European Broadcasting Union
- Language: Serbo-Croatian

Udruženje javnih radija i televizija (UJRT; Serbian Cyrillic: Удружење јавних радија и телевизија, English: Alliance of Public Radio and Television) was the union of public broadcasters of Serbia and Montenegro. It served as a full member of the European Broadcasting Union (EBU) from 9 July 2001 until its dissolution in 2006.

== Members ==
- Radio Television of Serbia
- Radio and Television of Montenegro
