= Montenegro in the Eurovision Song Contest 2026 =

- Eurovision Song Contest 2026
- Participating broadcaster: Radio and Television of Montenegro (RTCG)
- Country: Montenegro
- Selection process: Montesong 2025
- Selection date: 21 December 2025

Competing entry
- Song: "Nova zora"
- Artist: Tamara Živković
- Songwriter: Boris Subotić

Placement
- Semi-final result: Failed to qualify (13th)

Participation chronology

Montenegro was represented at the Eurovision Song Contest 2026 with the song "Nova zora", written by Boris Subotić and performed by Tamara Živković. The Montenegrin participating broadcaster, Radio and Television of Montenegro (RTCG), organised the national final Montesong 2025 to select its entry for the contest.

Montenegro was drawn to compete in the first semi-final of the Eurovision Song Contest, which took place on 12 May 2026. Performing during the show in position 8, "Nova zora" was not announced among the top 10 entries of the second semi-final and therefore did not qualify to compete in the final. This marked Montenegro's seventh consecutive failure to qualify for the final of the Eurovision Song Contest. It was later revealed that Montenegro placed thirteenth out of the fifteen participating countries in the first semi-final, obtaining a total of 71 points.

== Background ==
Prior to the 2026 contest, Radio and Television of Montenegro (RTCG) has participated in the Eurovision Song Contest representing Montenegro as an independent country thirteen times since its first entry in 2007. Its best placing in the contest was thirteenth position, which it achieved in 2015 with the song "Adio" performed by Knez. In 2014, Montenegro qualified to the final for the first time since it began participating, and have since featured in the final of the Eurovision Song Contest one more time in 2015. RTCG opted not to participate in 2010, 2011, 2021, 2023, and 2024, citing "modest results" and/or financial difficulties as the reason for its absences. In 2025, Montenegro failed to qualify for the final with the song "Dobrodošli" performed by Nina Žižić, finishing 16th (last) in its semi-final.

As part of its duties as participating broadcaster, RTCG organises the selection of its entry in the Eurovision Song Contest and broadcasts the event in the country. On 26 August 2025, RTCG confirmed its participation, with Montesong returning as the national selection. RTCG had used various methods to select the Montenegrin entry in the past, such as internal selections and televised national finals to choose the performer, song or both to compete at Eurovision.

== Before Eurovision ==
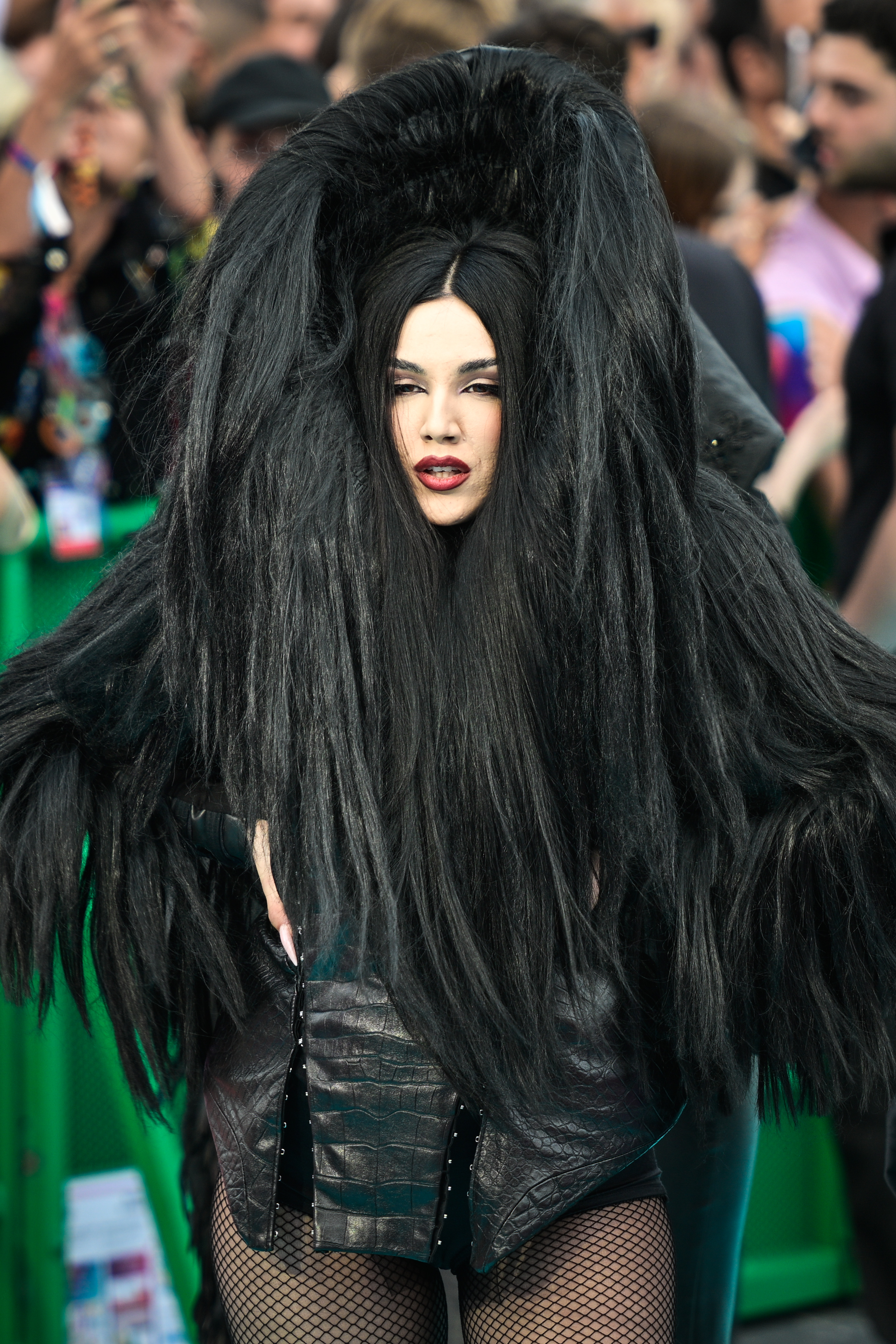
Tamara Živković, who was selected to represent Montenegro following Montesong 2025, at the Opening Ceremony in Vienna.

=== Montesong 2025 ===
Montesong 2025 was the national final format organised by RTCG to select its entry for the Eurovision Song Contest 2026. The competition consisted of a final on 21 December 2025, which took place at the RTCG Grand Studio in Podgorica and was hosted by Andrea Šekularac, Dajana Golubović Pejović and Jelena Božović. The final was broadcast on TVCG 1, TVCG MNE, MNE Play, and on the Youtube channels of Montesong and Eurovision Song Contest. Internationally, most of the audience following the contest live was from Serbia, Bosnia and Herzegovina, the United Kingdom, Germany, and the United States.

==== Competing entries ====
On 3 September 2025, RTCG opened a submission platform for interested artists and composers to submit their entries until 3 October 2025. Performers were required to be citizens of Montenegro, while songwriters may be of any nationality. Unlike the 2024 edition, there were no requirements on the language of the entries. RTCG received 37 submissions at the closing of the deadline. A selection jury consisting of Andrijana Božović, Dražen Bauković, Stefan Bjeletić, Jovo Vukčević and Antonela Martinović reviewed the submissions and selected the top fifteen songs for the competition; each juror evaluated each song using a points system, giving a maximum of 50 points for composition, 30 points for lyrics and 20 points for production, with entries having to achieve at least 75 points in order to advance to the final. The selected entries were announced on 14 October 2025 during the RTCG morning show Dobro jutro, Crno Goro, broadcast on TVCG 1, and released on 27 November 2025. Among the competing artists is Andrea Demirović, who represented Montenegro in 2009.

Artist	Song	Songwriter(s)
Andrea Demirović	"I Believe"	Aidan O'Connor; Andrea Demirović; Casey McQuillen
Baryak	"Minerva" (Минерва)	Luka Perazić; Mišo Vukčević; Rade Vukčević
Dolce Hera	"Casanova 91"	Aleksandra Prelević Palladino; Marko Čaćić; Todor Tadić
Đurđa	"Dominos"	David Lindgren Zacharias; Eric Lehmann; Herman Gardarfve; Melanie Wehbe; Patrik Jean
Krstinja	"Oli, oli" (Оли, оли)	Leontina Vukomanović; Nemanja Filipović
Lana	"Doline" (Долине)	Ljubomir Stanišić; Momčilo Zeković Zeko; Rade Đurđevac
Lana and Đorđe	"Temperatura" (Температура)	Darko Dimitrov; Violeta Mihajlovska Milić
Lara Baltić	"Rhythm Boy"	Nemanja Antonić
Luka Radović	"Pjevaj, vilo" (Пјевај, вило)	Luka Radović; Miloš Mihajlović Blaze; Petar Šćepović
Majda Božović	"Ipak smo ljudi" (Ипак смо људи)	Lena Kovačević; Violeta Mihajlovska Milić
Mila Nikić	"Kao varnica" (Као варница)	Alexander Keech; Gerrit Arnold; Kristina Kovač; Mila Nikić; Olivér Patocska
Neno Murić	"Ako čuješ glas" (Ако чујеш глас)	Dejan Božović; Natalija Pavićević
Stefan	"Nedekodirana" (Недекодирана)	Dejan Dedović
Tamara Živković	"Nova zora" (Нова зора)	Boris Subotić
Tina Džankić	"Shadows"	Ben Pyne; David Hutchinson; Niels Sakko; Stefan Celar; Tina Džankić

==== Final ====
The final took place on 21 December 2025. The winner, "Nova zora" by Tamara Živković, was selected by a 50/50 combination of votes from a five-member international jury and a public vote – consisting of a televote and an online voting on the RTCG website, with the latter also accepting votes worldwide – following a similar pattern to the one used in the Eurovision Song Contest final: the two votings each determined a ranking whereby the entries were assigned 1–8, 10 and 12 points. The jury consisted of past Eurovision representatives Abor & Tynna (Germany 2025), Asja Džogović (Montenegro at the 2025 junior contest), Nina Žižić (Montenegro 2025) and Shkodra Elektronike (Albania 2025), all of whom attended the show as guests, as well as composer Vladimir Graić; 2015 Montenegrin entrant Knez also performed during the show.

The show also saw the presentation of the Montefon Awards by Association of Variety Artists and Performers of Montenegro, with the prize for discovery of the year awarded to Baryak, the prize for group of the year awarded to Bubnjivi i psi, the prize for contribution to Montenegrin musical culture awarded to Edo Abdović, the prize for hit of the year awarded to Nina Žižić for "Dobrodošli" and the prizes for female and male singer of the year awarded to Andrijana Božović and Knez, respectively; a separate participation award for best interpretation went to Majda Božović.

Final – 21 December 2025
R/O	Artist	Song	Jury		Public vote		Total	Place
R/O	Artist	Song	Votes	Points	Votes	Points	Total	Place
1	Lara Baltić	"Rhythm Boy"	27	6	22	12	18	2
2	Stefan	"Nedekodirana"	12	0	0	0	0	14
3	Mila Nikić	"Kao varnica"	15	1	2	0	1	13
4	Majda Božović	"Ipak smo ljudi"	36	10	2	0	10	5
5	Krstinja	"Oli, oli"	32	8	7	4	12	4
6	Baryak	"Minerva"	18	3	10	5	8	7
7	Neno Murić	"Ako čuješ glas"	17	2	4	2	4	10
8	Lana	"Doline"	19	4	1	0	4	11
9	Đurđa	"Dominos"	12	0	13	7	7	9
10	Dolce Hera	"Casanova 91"	0	0	3	1	1	12
11	Tamara Živković	"Nova zora"	38	12	22	10	22	1
12	Andrea Demirović	"I Believe"	15	0	0	0	0	15
13	Tina Džankić	"Shadows"	21	5	5	3	8	8
14	Luka Radović	"Pjevaj, vilo"	0	0	16	8	8	6
15	Lana and Đorđe	"Temperatura"	28	7	11	6	13	3

Detailed jury votes
R/O	Song	A. Džogović	Shkodra Elektronike	Abor & Tynna	V. Graić	N. Žižić	Total	Converted
1	"Rhythm Boy"	8	4	10		5	27	6
2	"Nedekodirana"		12				12	0
3	"Kao varnica"		8		7		15 (Note: Despite "Kao varnica" and "I Believe" receiving the same number of points from the jury, and receiving the same number of 12, 10 and 8 points, "Kao varnica" was deemed to have finished higher due to receiving more sets of 7 points)	1
4	"Ipak smo ljudi"	10	7	7	6	6	36	10
5	"Oli, oli"	7	5	4	12	4	32	8
6	"Minerva"	2	2	2		12	18	3
7	"Ako čuješ glas"	4	1		10	2	17	2
8	"Doline"	1	10	6	2		19	4
9	"Dominos"	3		5	1	3	12	0
10	"Casanova 91"						0	0
11	"Nova zora"	12	6	8	4	8	38	12
12	"I Believe"		3	3	8	1	15	0
13	"Shadows"	5		1	5	10	21	5
14	"Pjevaj, vilo"						0	0
15	"Temperatura"	6		12	3	7	28	7

Detailed public votes
R/O	Song	Montenegro		International		Total	Converted
R/O	Song	Votes	Points	Votes	Points	Total	Converted
1	"Rhythm Boy"	4,822	12	4,959	10	22 (Note: Despite "Rhythm Boy" and "Nova zora" receiving the same number of points from the public, "Rhythm Boy" was deemed to have finished higher due to receiving more points from the Montenegrin audience)	12
2	"Nedekodirana"	827	0	117	0	0	0
3	"Kao varnica"	654	0	270	2	2	0
4	"Ipak smo ljudi"	1,110	2	104	0	2	0
5	"Oli, oli"	1,393	7	105	0	7	4
6	"Minerva"	1,139	5	382	5	10	5
7	"Ako čuješ glas"	506	0	375	4	4	2
8	"Doline"	859	1	182	0	1	0
9	"Dominos"	1,340	6	1,049	7	13	7
10	"Casanova 91"	176	0	363	3	3	1
11	"Nova zora"	2,334	10	5,668	12	22	10
12	"I Believe"	390	0	91	0	0	0
13	"Shadows"	1,118	4	215	1	5	3
14	"Pjevaj, vilo"	1,774	8	409	6	14	8
15	"Temperatura"	1,117	3	1,093	8	11	6

=== Promotion ===
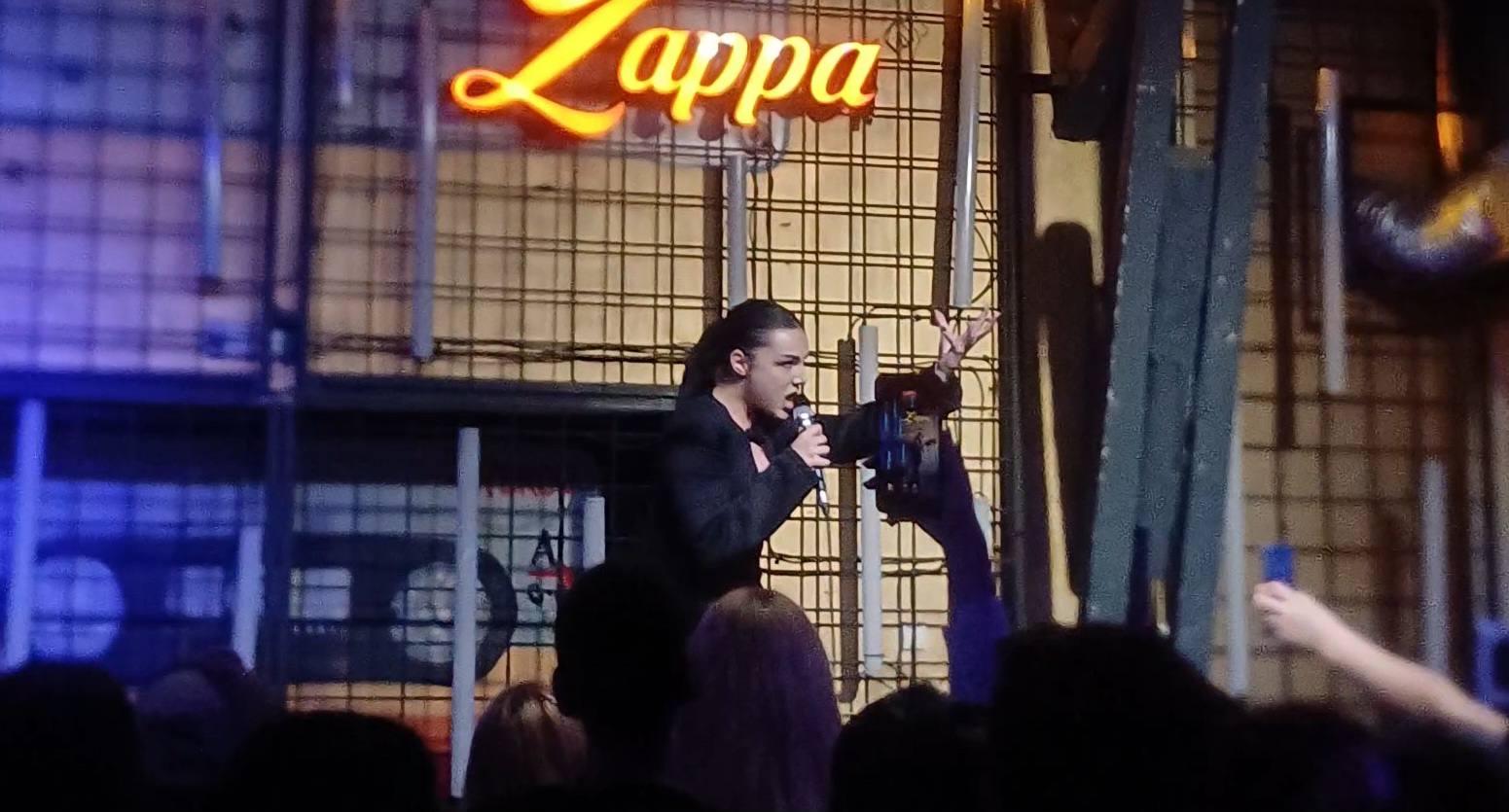
Tamara Živković at the PzE Afterparty event in Belgrade

As part of the promotion of her participation in the contest, Tamara Živković attended Eurovision in Concert on 11 April 2026, London Eurovision Party on 19 April and PzE Afterparty on 22 April 2026.

Additionally, Tamara Živković visited the Montenegro's embassy in Vienna on 8 May 2026.

== At Eurovision ==
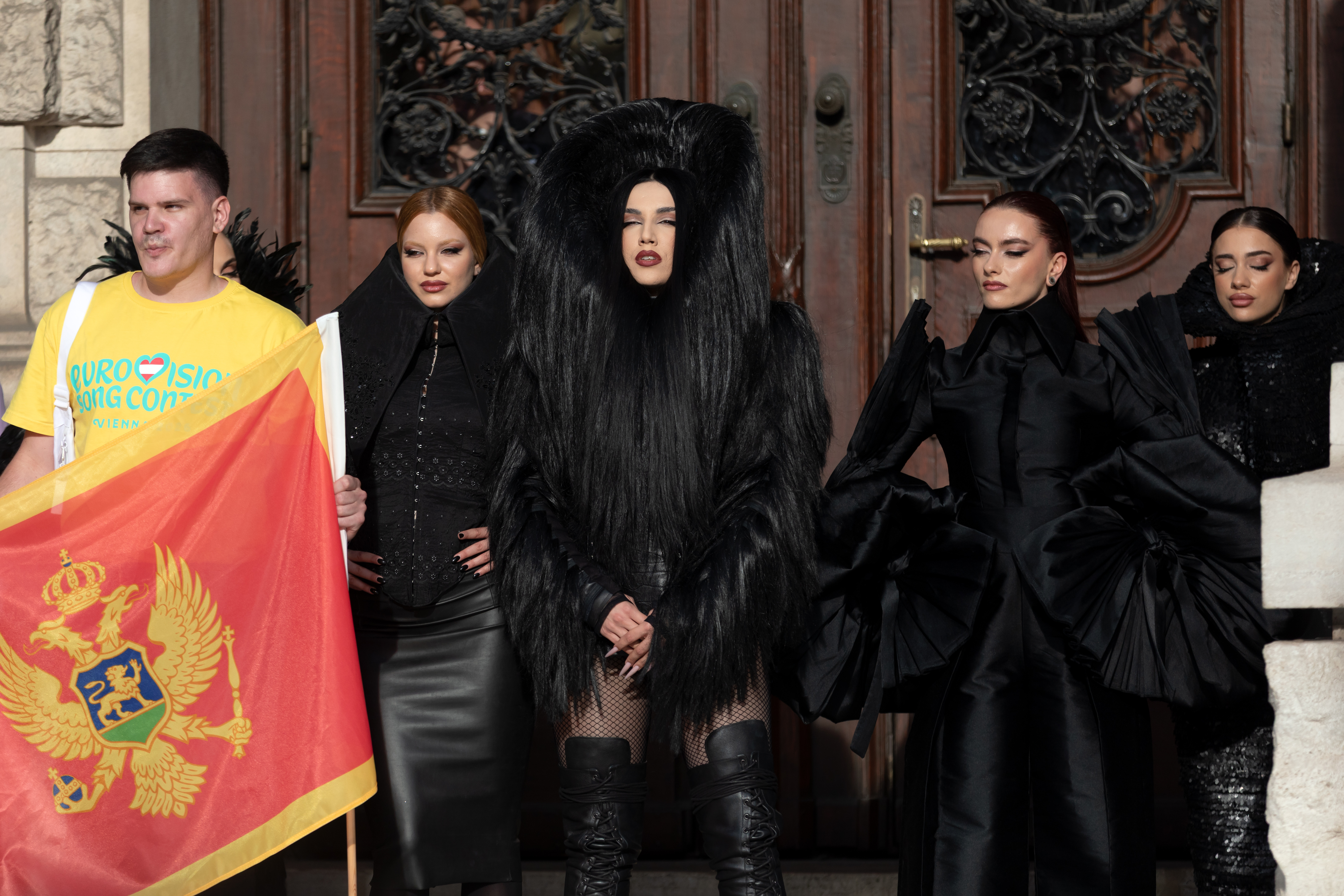
Tamara Živković and the Montenegrin delegation during the opening ceremony.

The Eurovision Song Contest 2026 took place at the Wiener Stadthalle in Vienna, Austria, and consisted of two semi-finals held on the respective dates of 12 and 14 May and the final on 16 May 2026. All nations with the exceptions of the host country and the "Big Four" (France, Germany, Italy and the United Kingdom) were required to qualify from one of two semi-finals in order to compete for the final; the top ten countries from each semi-final progressed to the final. On 12 January 2026, an allocation draw was held to determine which of the two semi-finals, as well as which half of the show, each country performed in; the European Broadcasting Union (EBU) split up the competing countries into different pots based on voting patterns from previous contests, with countries with favourable voting histories put into the same pot. Montenegro was scheduled for the second half of the first semi-final. The shows' producers then decided the running order for the semi-finals; Montenegro was set to perform in position 8.

In Montenegro, RTCG broadcast the first semi-final and the final on TVCG 1, while the second semi-final was broadcast on TVCG 2. All shows were broadcast with commentary from Dražen Bauković and Tijana Mišković in Podgorica. RTCG also broadcast the event on Radio 98.

=== Semi final ===
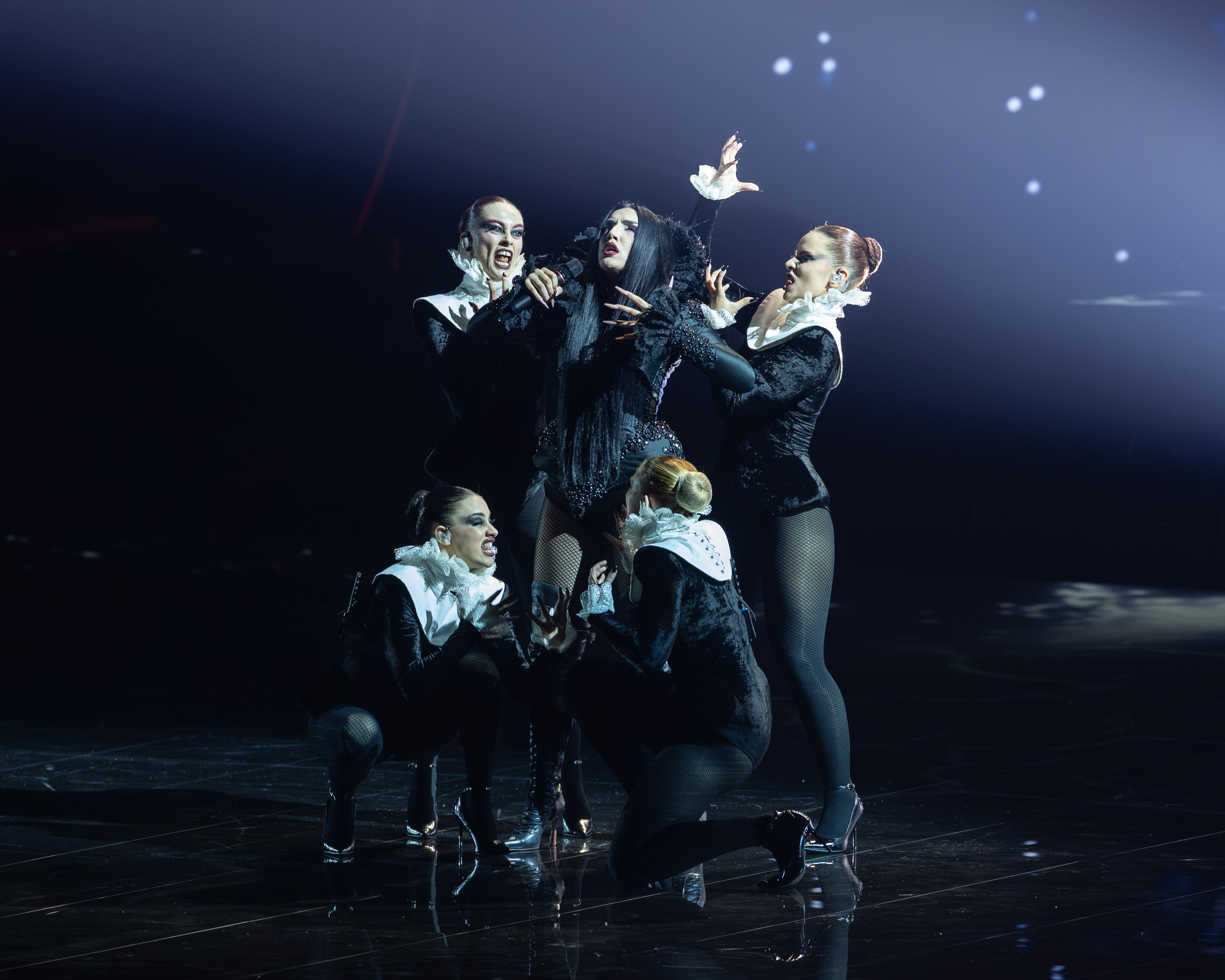
Tamara Živković during the first semi-final on 12 May 2026.

Montenegro was allocated for the first semi final, and later, was announced to perform in position eight during the show, following the performance from Finland and preceding the entry from Estonia. Živković was joined by Isidora Marić, Mina Rajić, Sofija Ilić and Tamara Krstić as backing dancers for the performance. At the end of the show, the country was not announced as a qualifier for the final, extending Montenegro's run as the country with the longest non-qualification streak. It was later revealed that Montenegro placed thirteenth out of the fifteen participating countries in the first semi-final with 71 points. Despite the non-qualification, this marked Montenegro's highest point tally in Eurovision history. In the jury vote, Montenegro placed thirteenth with 26 points, whilst in the televote, Montenegro placed tenth with 45 points.

=== Voting ===
Below is a breakdown of points awarded by and to Montenegro in the first semi-final and in the final. Voting during the three shows involved each country awarding sets of points from 1-8, 10 and 12: one from their professional jury and the other from televoting. The Montenegrin jury consisted of Bojan Delic, Gojko Berkuljan, Luka Perazic, Andrijana Vučetić Obadović, Gana Čomagić, Milica Raičević and Tamara Vujačić, the latter of whom represented Montenegro in the Eurovision Song Contest 2019 as a member of D mol. In the first semi-final, Montenegro placed 13th with 71 points, marking Montenegro's highest point tally to date in a Eurovision semi-final. The country placed tenth in the televote, obtaining 45 points, and thirteenth in the jury vote with 26 points. Over the course of the contest, Montenegro awarded its 12 points to Serbia in both the jury vote and televote of the second semi-final, and to Serbia in both the public televote and the jury vote in the final.

RTCG appointed Nina Žižić, who represented Montenegro in 2013 and 2025, as its spokesperson to announce the Montenegrin jury's votes in the final.

==== Points awarded to Montenegro ====
Points awarded to Montenegro (Semi-final 1)
Score	Televote	Jury
12 points		
10 points	Croatia; Serbia	
8 points		Greece
7 points		San Marino
6 points	Poland	
5 points	Georgia	
4 points	Greece; Portugal	Germany
3 points		Portugal
2 points	Israel; Italy; Rest of the World	Finland
1 point		Croatia; Serbia

==== Points awarded by Montenegro ====
Points awarded by Montenegro (Semi-final 1)
Score	Televote	Jury
12 points	Serbia	Serbia
10 points	Croatia	Croatia
8 points	Israel	Finland
7 points	Moldova	Greece
6 points	Poland	San Marino
5 points	Lithuania	Sweden
4 points	Finland	Moldova
3 points	Greece	Poland
2 points	Portugal	Portugal
1 point	Belgium	Belgium

Points awarded by Montenegro (Final)
Points	Televote	Jury
12 points	Serbia	Serbia
10 points	Albania	Albania
8 points	Croatia	Croatia
7 points	Bulgaria	Finland
6 points	Italy	Greece
5 points	Ukraine	Bulgaria
4 points	Israel	Sweden
3 points	Romania	Italy
2 points	Greece	Moldova
1 point	Australia	Poland

==== Detailed voting results ====
Each participating broadcaster assembles a seven-member jury panel consisting of music industry professionals who are citizens of the country they represent and two of which have to be between 18 and 25 years old. Each jury, and individual jury member, is required to meet a strict set of criteria regarding professional background, as well as diversity in gender and age. No member of a national jury was permitted to be related in any way to any of the competing acts in such a way that they cannot vote impartially and independently. The individual rankings of each jury member as well as the nation's televoting results were released shortly after the grand final.

The following members comprised the Montenegrin jury:

- Bojan Delić
- Gojko Berkuljan
- Luka Perazić
- Andrijana Vučetić Obadović
- Gana Čomagić
- Milica Raičević
- Tamara Vujačić

Detailed voting results from Montenegro (Semi-final 1)
R/O	Country	Jury									Televote	
R/O	Country	Juror 1	Juror 2	Juror 3	Juror 4	Juror 5	Juror 6	Juror 7	Rank	Points	Rank	Points
01	Moldova	8	8	8	4	6	7	8	7	4	4	7
02	Sweden	7	5	4	3	7	4	7	6	5	11	
03	Croatia	4	1	3	1	1	5	2	2	10	2	10
04	Greece	3	7	5	5	4	3	1	4	7	8	3
05	Portugal	9	9	12	10	9	13	12	9	2	9	2
06	Georgia	13	14	11	11	10	11	13	13		13	
07	Finland	2	2	2	7	3	2	5	3	8	7	4
08	Montenegro											
09	Estonia	12	11	10	13	13	9	10	11		12	
10	Israel	10	12	14	14	14	14	6	12		3	8
11	Belgium	11	13	9	9	11	10	14	10	1	10	1
12	Lithuania	14	10	13	12	12	12	11	14		6	5
13	San Marino	5	3	7	6	5	6	4	5	6	14	
14	Poland	6	6	6	8	8	8	9	8	3	5	6
15	Serbia	1	4	1	2	2	1	3	1	12	1	12

Detailed voting results from Montenegro (Final)
R/O	Country	Jury									Televote	
R/O	Country	Juror A	Juror B	Juror C	Juror D	Juror E	Juror F	Juror G	Rank	Points	Rank	Points
01	Denmark	12	20	20	19	15	21	21	18		15	
02	Germany	11	9	19	17	16	15	16	14		25	
03	Israel	10	25	16	25	25	25	25	20		7	4
04	Belgium	17	14	18	8	10	9	7	12		21	
05	Albania	7	1	1	1	3	2	5	2	10	2	10
06	Greece	2	6	6	5	6	5	8	5	6	9	2
07	Ukraine	18	18	11	15	22	23	15	17		6	5
08	Australia	8	12	8	16	12	20	3	11		10	1
09	Serbia	4	3	3	3	1	1	1	1	12	1	12
10	Malta	23	22	17	21	19	16	13	19		19	
11	Czechia	21	23	22	22	18	22	23	24		18	
12	Bulgaria	5	5	9	7	5	10	6	6	5	4	7
13	Croatia	3	4	2	6	2	3	4	3	8	3	8
14	United Kingdom	19	24	25	24	24	24	24	25		23	
15	France	13	13	10	14	8	14	14	13		14	
16	Moldova	9	11	13	9	4	4	10	9	2	11	
17	Finland	14	2	4	2	13	7	2	4	7	12	
18	Poland	6	10	7	11	11	8	9	10	1	13	
19	Lithuania	25	21	24	18	20	19	20	22		20	
20	Sweden	15	7	5	4	7	6	12	7	4	22	
21	Cyprus	24	17	23	23	21	18	22	23		16	
22	Italy	1	8	12	10	9	13	11	8	3	5	6
23	Norway	20	19	15	13	14	12	19	16		17	
24	Romania	22	15	14	12	17	11	18	15		8	3
25	Austria	16	16	21	20	23	17	17	21		24	
