= Tamara Živković =

Montenegrin singer (born 5 June 2000)

Tamara Živković Тамара Живковић
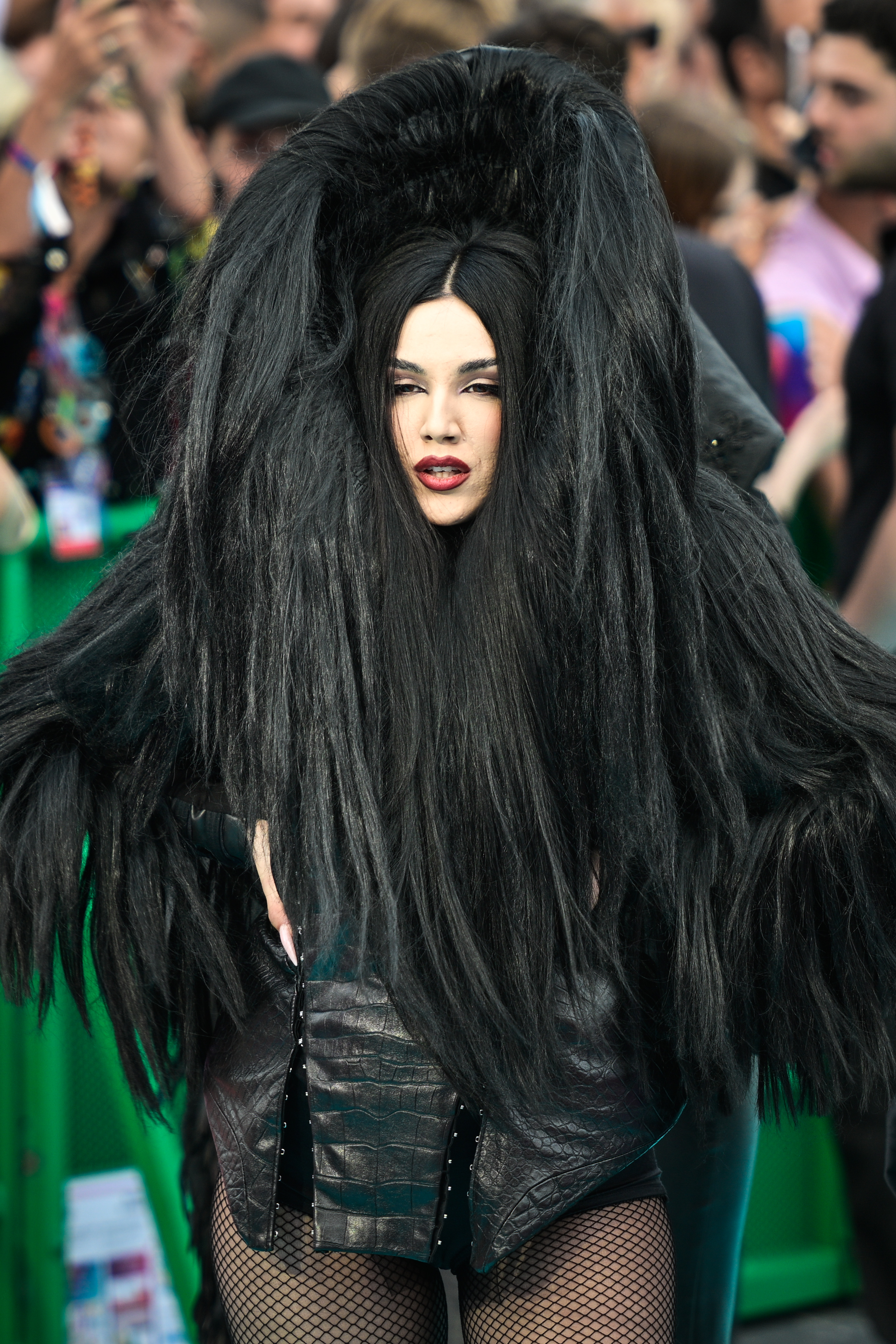
- Živković on the Turquoise Carpet at Eurovision 2026

Background information
- Born: 5 June 2000 (age 26); Kotor, Montenegro, FR Yugoslavia
- Origin: Kotor, Montenegro
- Occupations: Singer; flautist
- Instruments: Vocals; flute
- Years active: 2016–present
- Label: Magnus Media

Tamara Živković (Montenegrin Cyrillic: Тамара Живковић, pronounced [tǎmara ʒǐʋkoʋit͡ɕ]; born 5 June 2000) is a Montenegrin singer and flautist. She represented Montenegro in the Eurovision Song Contest 2026 with the song "Nova zora".

In 2022, she was a finalist in the fifteenth edition of the Serbian singing competition Zvezde Granda.

== Career ==
Tamara Živković began her musical career at a young age. She gave her first solo concert at age 14, combining flute playing with vocal performance.

In 2016, she took part in the Serbian singing competition Pinkove Zvezdice.

In 2022, she took part in the fifteenth edition of the Serbian singing competition Zvezde Granda, where she made it to the final.

In 2024, Živković competed in Montesong 2024, Montenegro's national selection for the Eurovision Song Contest 2025 with the song "Poguban let", replacing Boban Rajović who withdrew from the competition. At the end she finished in 9th place with 6 points.

In 2025, Živković competed in Montesong 2025 with the song "Nova zora". She won the final, winning the jury vote and achieving second place in the public vote with 12 and 10 points, respectively, thus gaining the right to represent Montenegro at the Eurovision Song Contest 2026 in Vienna, Austria. At Eurovision, she performed in the first semi-final on 12 May 2026, but failed to qualify to the grand final.

== Personal life ==
She was born on 5 June 2000 and raised in Kotor, Montenegro, where she has also attended music school.

As of 2025, she is a third-year undergraduate student at the University of Arts in Belgrade.

Since 2022, she resides between Kotor and Belgrade, capital of Serbia.

Živković has named Charli XCX, Lady Gaga, Rosalía and Tate McRae as her inspirations.

== Discography ==
=== Singles ===
List of singles as lead artist
Title	Year	Album or EP
"Poguban let"	2024	Non-album singles
"Prošla godina"	2025	Non-album singles
"Bez kontrole"	2025	Non-album singles
"Nova zora"	2025	Non-album singles

Awards and achievements
Preceded by Nina Žižić with "Dobrodošli"	Montenegro in the Eurovision Song Contest; 2026	Succeeded by TBD
