= Montenegro in the Eurovision Song Contest =

- Eurovision Song Contest
- Participating broadcaster: Radio and Television of Montenegro (RTCG)

Participation summary
- Appearances: 14 (2 finals)
- First appearance: 2007
- Highest placement: 13th: 2015
- Participation history: 2007; 2008; 2009; 2010; 2011; 2012; 2013; 2014; 2015; 2016; 2017; 2018; 2019; 2020; 2021; 2022; 2023; 2024; 2025; 2026
- Montenegro's page at Eurovision.com
- For the most recent participation see Montenegro in the Eurovision Song Contest 2026

Montenegro has been represented at the Eurovision Song Contest 14 times since its debut in 2007. The Montenegrin participating broadcaster in the contest is Radio and Television of Montenegro (RTCG).

Before its independence, the Socialist Republic of Montenegro participated in the contest as part of Yugoslavia (both the Socialist Federal Republic of Yugoslavia from 1961 to 1991 and the Federal Republic of Yugoslavia in 1992), and the Republic of Montenegro participated as part of Serbia and Montenegro (from 2004 to 2006). Entries selected by RTCG, formerly known as Radio-Televizija Titograd (RTT) during the era of Yugoslav participation, represented Yugoslavia in 1983 and 1984 and Serbia and Montenegro in 2005. Serbia and Montenegro's withdrawn 2006 entry was also selected by RTCG.

== Participation ==
Radio and Television of Montenegro (RTCG) has been a full member of the European Broadcasting Union (EBU) since 2006, thus eligible to participate in the Eurovision Song Contest since then. It has participated in the contest representing Montenegro since the 52nd edition in 2007.

Before the country became independent on 3 June 2006, entries from Montenegro had participated in the contest as part of Yugoslavia and later Serbia and Montenegro. Entries from the former SR Montenegro placed 4th in 1983 and 18th in 1984 as part of Yugoslavia, and an entry from the Republic of Montenegro placed 7th in 2005 as part of Serbia and Montenegro.

== History ==
RTCG organised the national final MontenegroSong to select the country's entries in 2007 and 2008, and internally selected the entry in 2009.

Montenegro failed to qualify for the final on its debut in 2007, as well as its appearances in 2008 and 2009. The country placed 11th in the first semi-final in 2009, its best result at the time, with "Just Get Out of My Life" performed by Andrea Demirović. In November 2009, RTCG announced that Montenegro would not participate in 2010 due to financial difficulties. RTCG applied to participate in the 2011 contest, but with the caveat that the potential representative would have to find sponsors themselves to fund their participation. As that did not come to fruition, in December 2010, Montenegro decided to not participate in the contest on financial grounds.

On 20 November 2011, the head of RTCG revealed that Montenegro would participate in the 2012 contest in Baku. The country internally selected its entry, "Euro Neuro" performed by Rambo Amadeus, which failed to qualify from the first semi-final. In 2013, Montenegro internally selected Who See and Nina Žižić with the song "Igranka", which failed to qualify. In 2014, Montenegro qualified for the final for the first time in its history with Sergej Ćetković's "Moj svijet". In 2015, Montenegro again qualified for the final with "Adio", performed by Knez and composed by Željko Joksimović. The song achieved the best Montenegrin result to date, finishing in 13th place. In 2016, RTCG selected Highway and their song "The Real Thing" internally. They performed in the first semi-final but failed to qualify, placing 13th with 60 points. In 2017, RTCG selected Slavko Kalezić and his song "Space" internally. The song failed to qualify, placing 16th. In 2018, RTCG organised the national final Montevizija to select their entry, which was won by "Inje" performed by Vanja Radovanović. The song failed to qualify from the second semi-final, placing 16th with 40 points. In 2019, RTCG again selected its representative through Montevizija, which was won by "Heaven" performed by D mol. The song failed to qualify from the first semi-final, placing 16th with 46 points.

Despite initially confirming its participation in the 2020 contest and aiming to expand Montevizija, Montenegro ultimately did not enter the contest, which was later cancelled as a result of the COVID-19 pandemic. RTCG later stated that the reason was due to "modest results" and financial issues. Montenegro also did not participate in the 2021 contest, but returned in 2022, having internally selected Vladana to represent the country with the song "Breathe". Once again, Montenegro failed to qualify for the final, finishing 17th in a field of 18 with 33 points in the second semi-final. Following another two-year absence, Montenegro was set to return in 2025, with plans to hold a new national final format, Montesong 2024, in order to determine its entry. On 31 October 2024, Boris Raonić, Director-General of RTCG, and Danijel Alibabić, President of the Association of Variety Performers of Montenegro, signed a formal cooperation agreement to establish Montesong as a common project, with Alibabić hinting at future editions of the festival. The first edition of Montesong was won by Neonoen with "Clickbait", however, the band was discovered to have performed the song prior to the cut-off date, leading to their withdrawal and runner-up Nina Žižić with "Dobrodošli" subsequently being chosen as the Montenegrin entrant in Basel. Žižić, however, finished in last place in the second semi-final, scoring only 12 points, giving Montenegro its worst ever result and marking the first time that Montenegro has finished in last place in a Eurovision event. Following the 2025 contest, Montesong producer Danijel Alibabić called for Montenegrin authorities to get more involved in RTCG's Eurovision efforts in 2026. Tamara Živković won the second edition of Montesong with "Nova zora", earning the right to represent Montenegro in Vienna. She failed to qualify for the final, marking Montenegro's seventh consecutive non-qualification since 2016.

== Participation overview ==
Prior to Yugoslavia and Serbia and Montenegro's dissolution, artists from the Montenegrin federal unit represented Yugoslavia in 1983, 1984, and Serbia and Montenegro as a republic unit in 2005, as well as being intended to compete in 2006, where they withdrew.

Table key
◁	Last place
†	Upcoming event

Year	Artist	Song	Language	Final	Points	Semi	Points
2007	Stevan Faddy	"'Ajde, kroči" ('Ајде, крочи)	Montenegrin	Failed to qualify		22	33
2008	Stefan Filipović	"Zauvijek volim te" (Заувијек волим те)	Montenegrin	Failed to qualify		14	23
2009	Andrea Demirović	"Just Get Out of My Life"	English	Failed to qualify		11	44
2012	Rambo Amadeus	"Euro Neuro"	English	Failed to qualify		15	20
2013	Who See (Note: Performance contains uncredited live vocals from Nina Žižić)	"Igranka" (Игранка)	Montenegrin	Failed to qualify		12	41
2014	Sergej Ćetković	"Moj svijet" (Мој свијет)	Montenegrin	19	37	7	63
2015	Knez	"Adio" (Адио)	Montenegrin	13	44	9	57
2016	Highway	"The Real Thing"	English	Failed to qualify		13	60
2017	Slavko Kalezić	"Space"	English	Failed to qualify		16	56
2018	Vanja Radovanović	"Inje" (Иње)	Montenegrin	Failed to qualify		16	40
2019	D mol	"Heaven"	English	Failed to qualify		16	46
2022	Vladana	"Breathe"	English, Italian	Failed to qualify		17	33
2025	Nina Žižić	"Dobrodošli" (Добродошли)	Montenegrin	Failed to qualify		16 ◁	12
2026	Tamara Živković	"Nova zora" (Нова зора)	Montenegrin	Failed to qualify		13	71
2027	Confirmed intention to participate †						

== Awards ==
=== Barbara Dex Award ===
The Barbara Dex Award was an annually awarded, fan-voted accolade for the "worst dressed" artists in the Eurovision Song Contest.

Year	Performer	Host city	Ref.
2017	Slavko Kalezić	(Ukraine) Kyiv	

== Related involvement ==
=== Heads of delegation ===
Each participating broadcaster in the Eurovision Song Contest assigns a head of delegation as the EBU's contact person and the leader of their delegation at the event. The delegation, whose size can greatly vary, includes a head of press, the performers, songwriters, composers, and backing vocalists, among others.

Year	Head of delegation	Ref.
2012–2017	Sabrija Vulić	
2018	Nataša Baranin	
2019	Sabrija Vulić	
2022	Ivan Maksimović	
2025–2026	Vladana Vučinić	

=== Jury members ===
Each participating broadcaster assembles a five-member jury panel consisting of music industry professionals for the Eurovision Song Contest, ranking all entries except for their own. The modern incarnation of jury voting was introduced beginning with the 2009 contest, and as of 2023, the juries' votes constitute just under 50% of the overall result in the final alongside televoting.

Jury members
Year	Juror A	Juror B	Juror C	Juror D	Juror E	Juror F	Juror G	Ref.
2015	Aleksandra Vojvodić	Darko Nikčević	Ilija Dapčević	Renata Perazić	Senad Drešević			
2016	Andrea Demirović	Dejan Božović	Ivana Čanović	Momčilo Zeković	Srđan Bulatović			
2017	Anita Popović (SF1)	Božo Bulatović	Branislan Nedović	Draško Đurović	Ivana Pekić			
2017	Dragan Bulajić (Final)	Božo Bulatović	Branislan Nedović	Draško Đurović	Ivana Pekić			
2018	Kaća Šćekić	Nina Žižić	Predrag Nedeljković	Senad Drešević	Zoja Đurović			
2019	Igor Perović	Marko Pešić	Saša Barjaktarović	Verica Čuljković	Vjera Nikolić			
2022	Unknown							
2025	Bojana Nenezić	Gavrilo Radunović	Jelena Božović	Marija Božović	Željko Vukčević			
2026	Bojan Delić	Gojko Berkuljan	Luka Perazić	Andrijana Vučetić Obadović	Gana Čomagić	Milica Raičević	Tamara Vujačić	

== Broadcasts ==
=== Commentators and spokespersons ===
For the show's broadcast on RTCG, various commentators have provided commentary on the contest in the Montenegrin language. At the Eurovision Song Contest after all points are calculated, the presenters of the show call upon each voting country to invite each respective spokesperson to announce the results of their vote on-screen.

From 1961 until 1992, Montenegro competed as part of Yugoslavia, and from 2004 to 2005 as part of Serbia and Montenegro. The Montenegrin affiliates of the Yugoslav Radio Television (JRT) first and Udruženje javnih radija i televizija (UJRT) later broadcast the contest there with Montenegrin commentary.

Year	Television		Radio		Spokesperson	Ref.
Year	Channel	Commentator	Channel	Commentator	Spokesperson	Ref.
2007	TVCG 1 (semi-final); TVCG 2 (final)	Dražen Bauković and Tamara Ivanković	No broadcast		Vidak Latković	
2008	TVCG 2 (semi-finals); TVCG 1 (final); RTCG SAT (all shows)	Dražen Bauković and Tamara Ivanković	No broadcast		Nina Radulović	
2009	TVCG 1 (SF1, final); TVCG 2 (SF2); RTCG SAT (all shows)	Dražen Bauković and Tamara Ivanković	No broadcast		Jovana Vukčević	
2010	TVCG 2 (all shows)	Dražen Bauković and Tamara Ivanković	No broadcast		Did not participate	
2011	No broadcast		No broadcast		Did not participate	
2012	TVCG 1 (SF1, final); TVCG 2 (SF2); TVCG SAT (all shows)	Dražen Bauković and Tamara Ivanković	No broadcast		Marija Marković	
2013	TVCG 1, TVCG 2 (Note: TVCG 2 provided deferred broadcast of all shows), TVCG SAT (all shows)	Dražen Bauković and Tamara Ivanković	Radio Crne Gore, Radio 98 (all shows)	Sonja Savović and Sanja Pejović	Ivana Sebek	
2014	TVCG 1, TVCG SAT (all shows)	Dražen Bauković and Tamara Ivanković	Radio Crne Gore, Radio 98 (all shows)	Sonja Savović and Sanja Pejović	Tijana Mišković	
2015	TVCG 2 (all shows); TVCG SAT (final)	Dražen Bauković and Tijana Mišković	No broadcast		Andrea Demirović	
2016	TVCG 1, TVCG SAT (all shows)	Dražen Bauković and Tijana Mišković	No broadcast		Danijel Alibabić	
2017	TVCG 1, TVCG SAT (all shows)	Dražen Bauković and Tijana Mišković	No broadcast		Tijana Mišković	
2018	TVCG 1, TVCG SAT (all shows)	Dražen Bauković and Ajda Šufta	No broadcast		Nataša Šotra	
2019	TVCG 1, TVCG 2, TVCG SAT (all shows)	Dražen Bauković and Tijana Mišković	No broadcast		Ajda Šufta	
2021	No broadcast		No broadcast		Did not participate	
2022	TVCG 1, TVCG SAT (all shows)	Dražen Bauković	No broadcast		Andrijana Vešović	
2023	TVCG 2 (all shows)	Ivan Maksimović	Radio 98 (all shows)	Unknown	Did not participate	
2024	TVCG 1 (all shows)	Ivan Maksimović	Radio 98 (all shows)	Unknown	Did not participate	
2025	TVCG 1, TVCG MNE (all shows)	Dražen Bauković	No broadcast		Marko Vukčević	
2026	TVCG 1 (SF1, final); TVCG 2 (SF2)	Dražen Bauković and Tijana Mišković	Radio 98 (all shows)	Unknown	Nina Žižić	

- From 1961 until 1992, Montenegro competed as part of Yugoslavia and from 2004 to 2005 as part of Serbia and Montenegro.

== Photo gallery ==
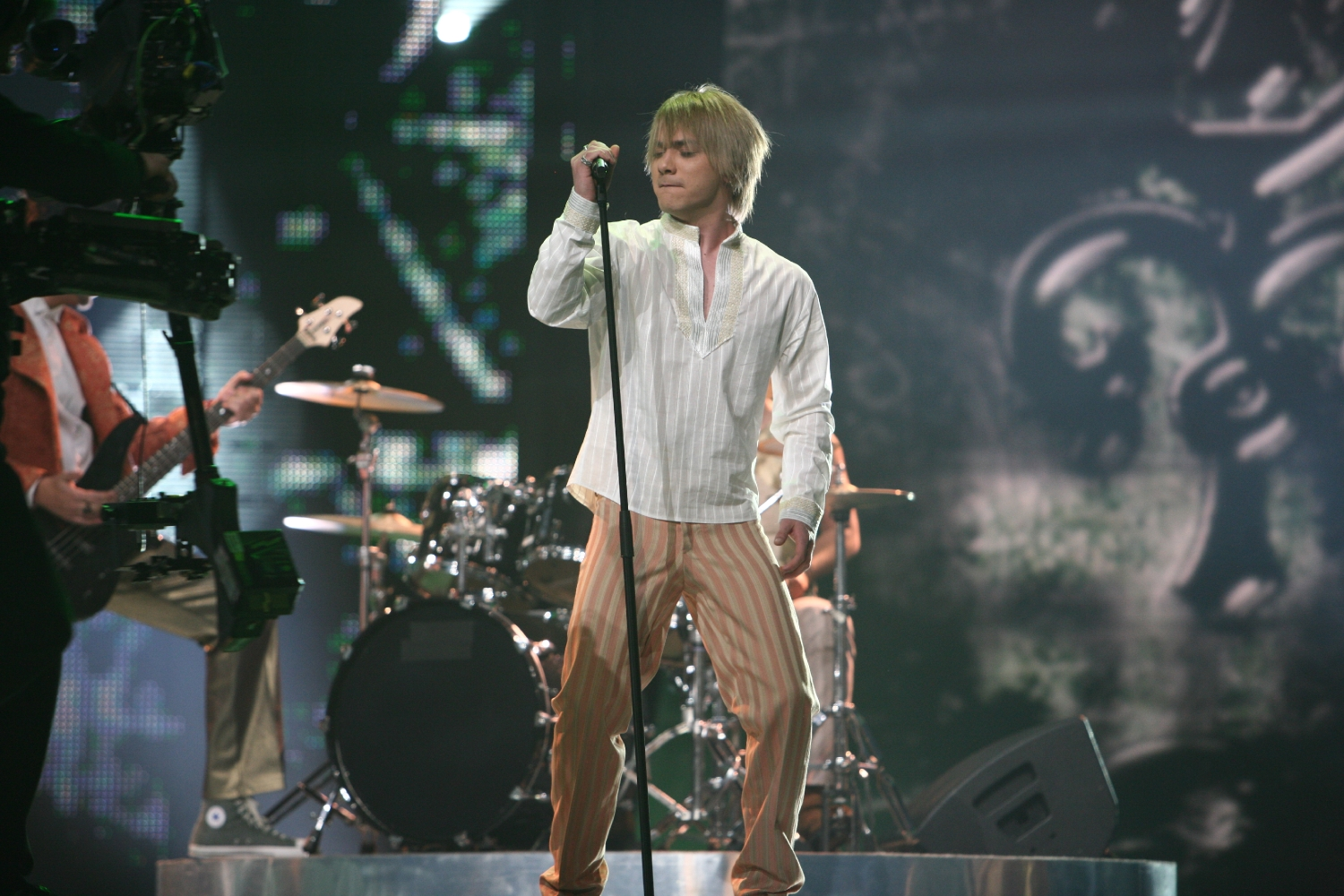
Stevan Faddy in Helsinki (2007)

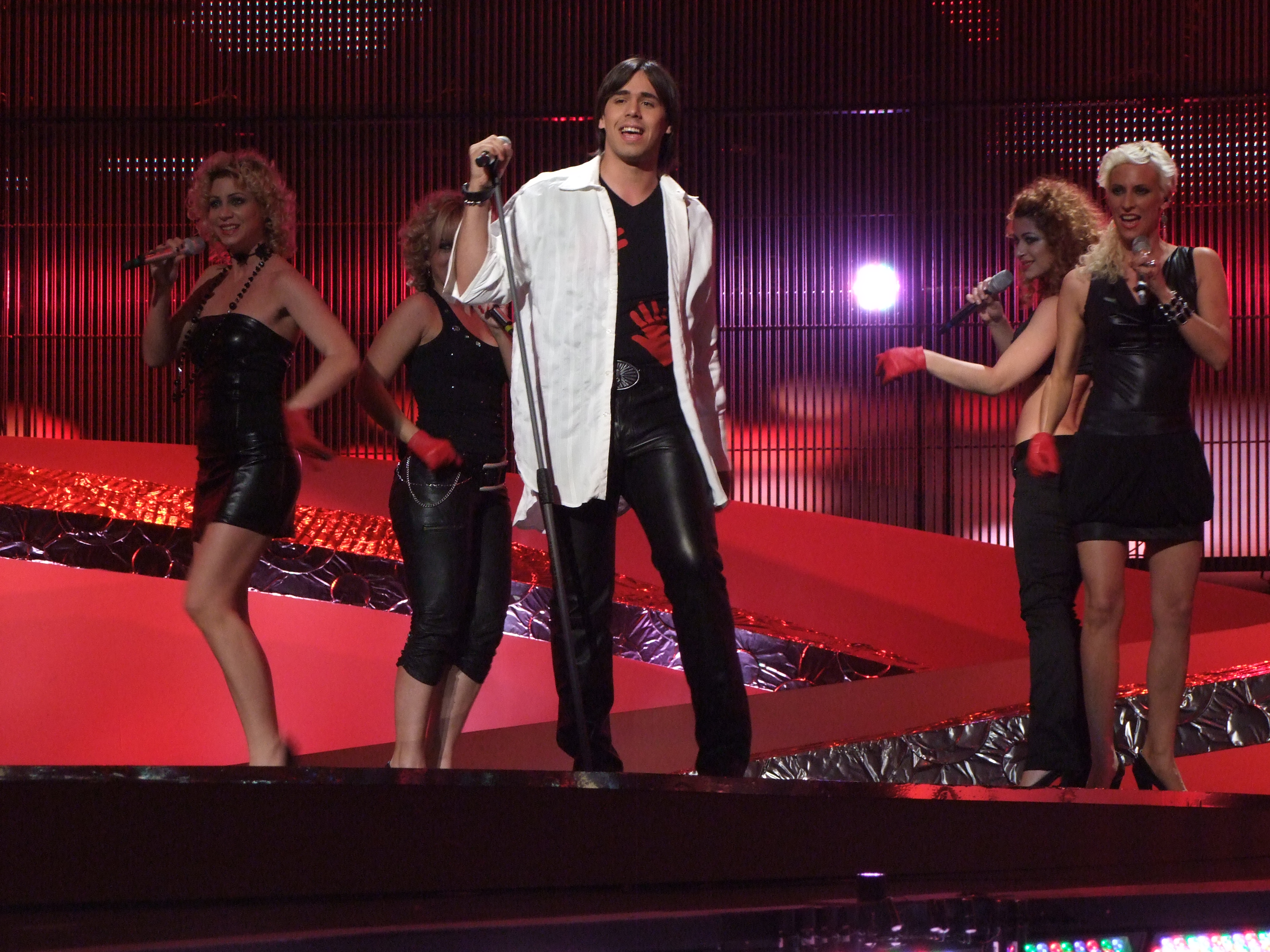
Stefan Filipović in Belgrade (2008)

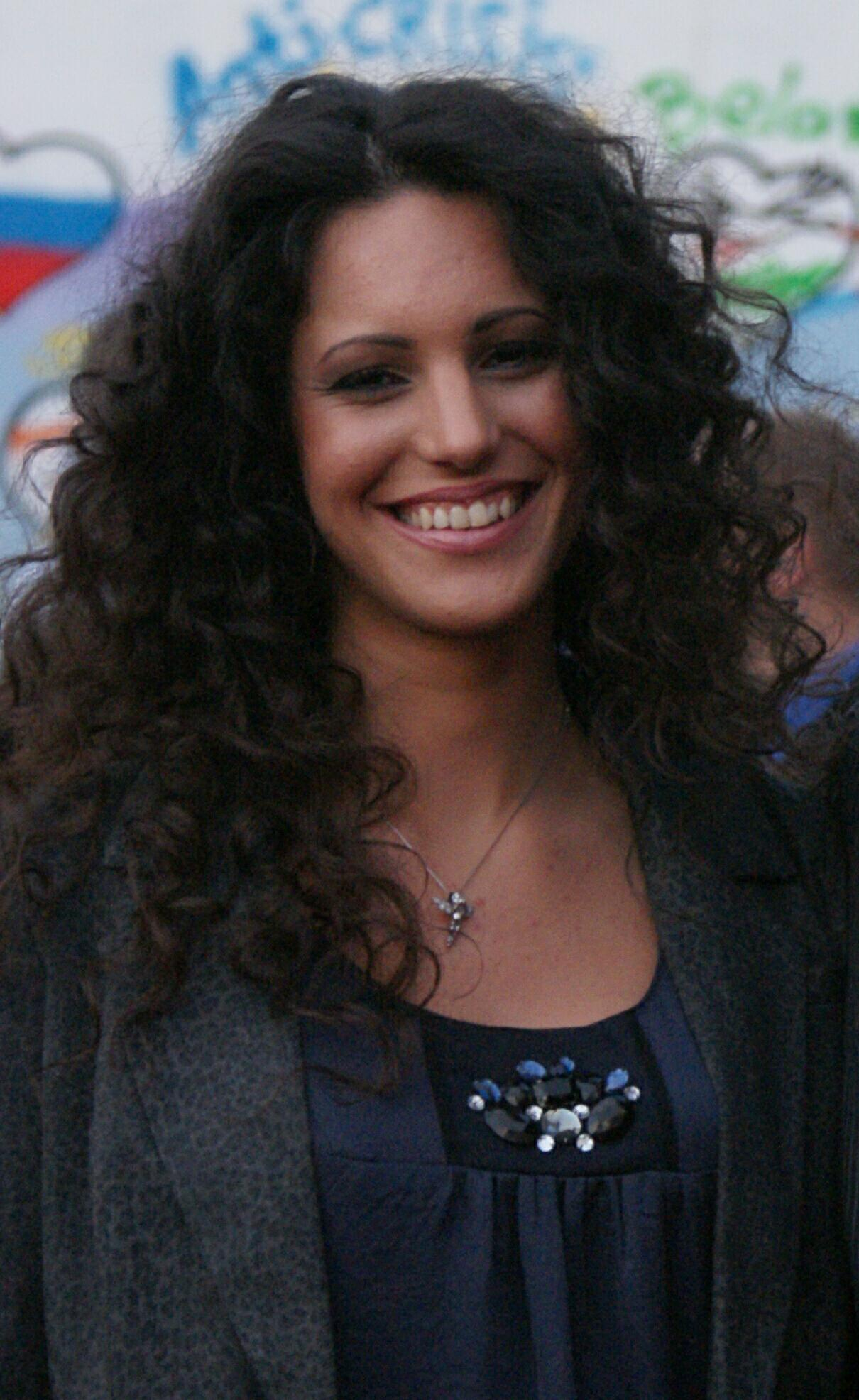
Andrea Demirović in Moscow (2009)

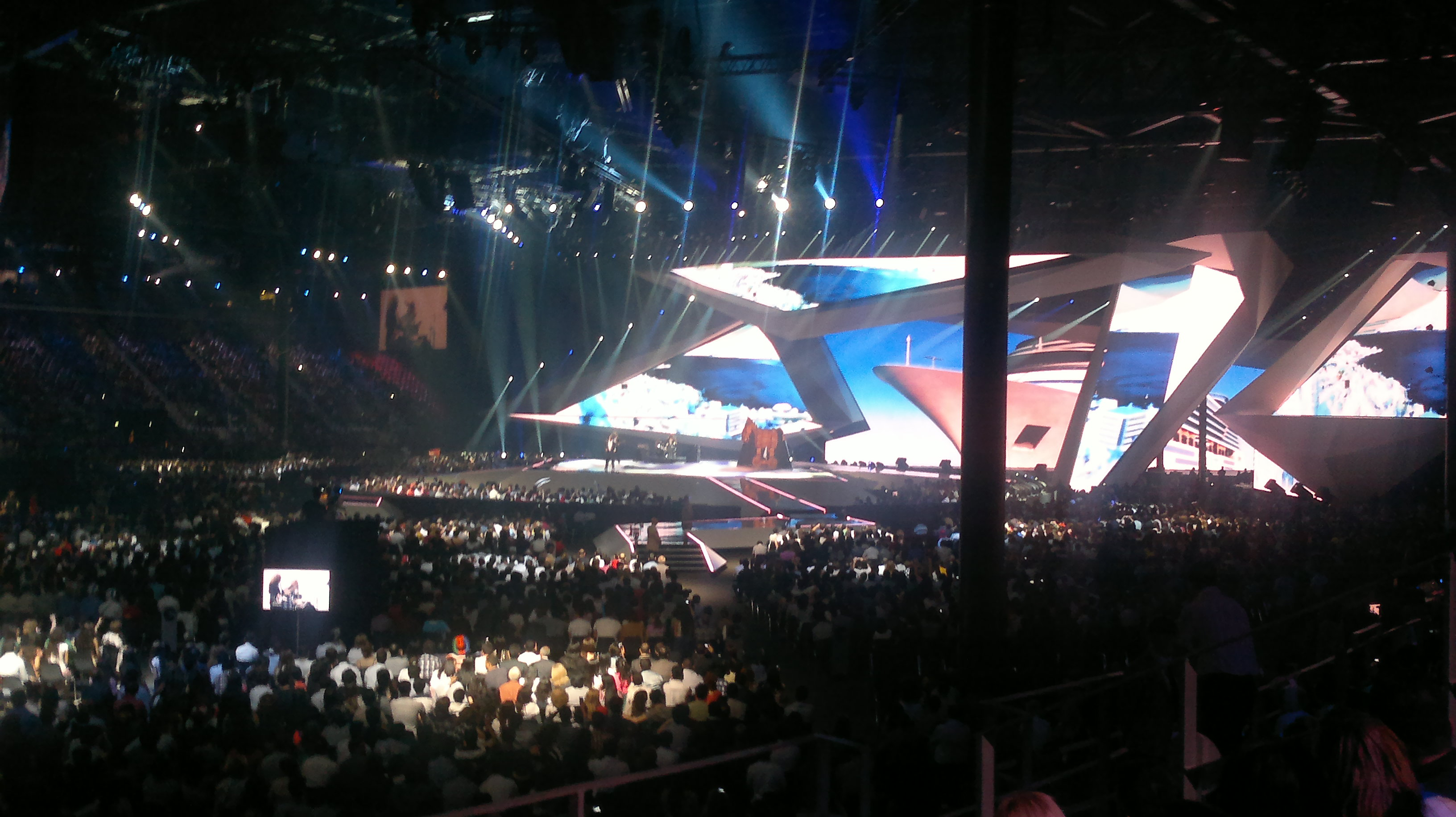
Rambo Amadeus in Baku (2012)

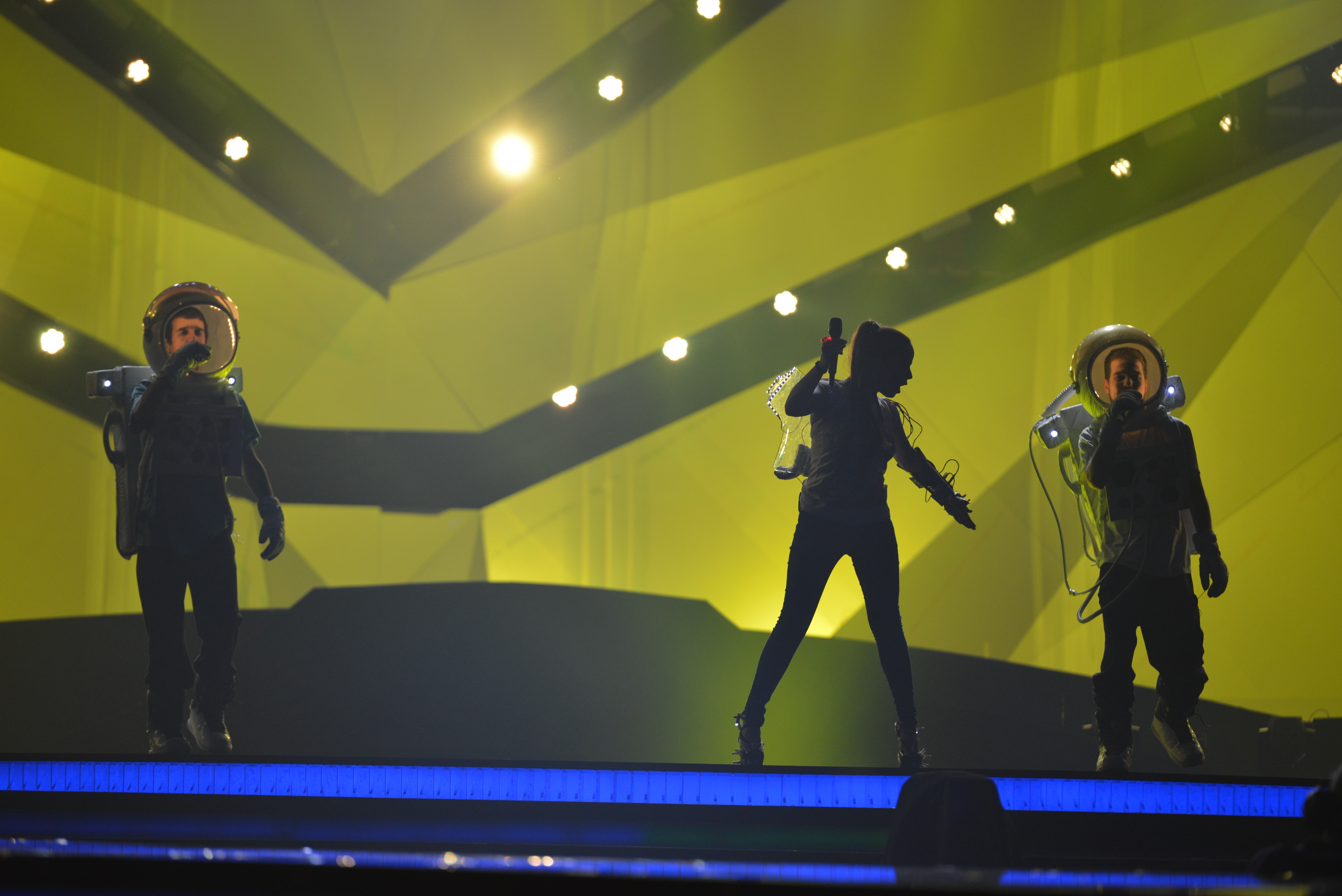
Who See in Malmö (2013)

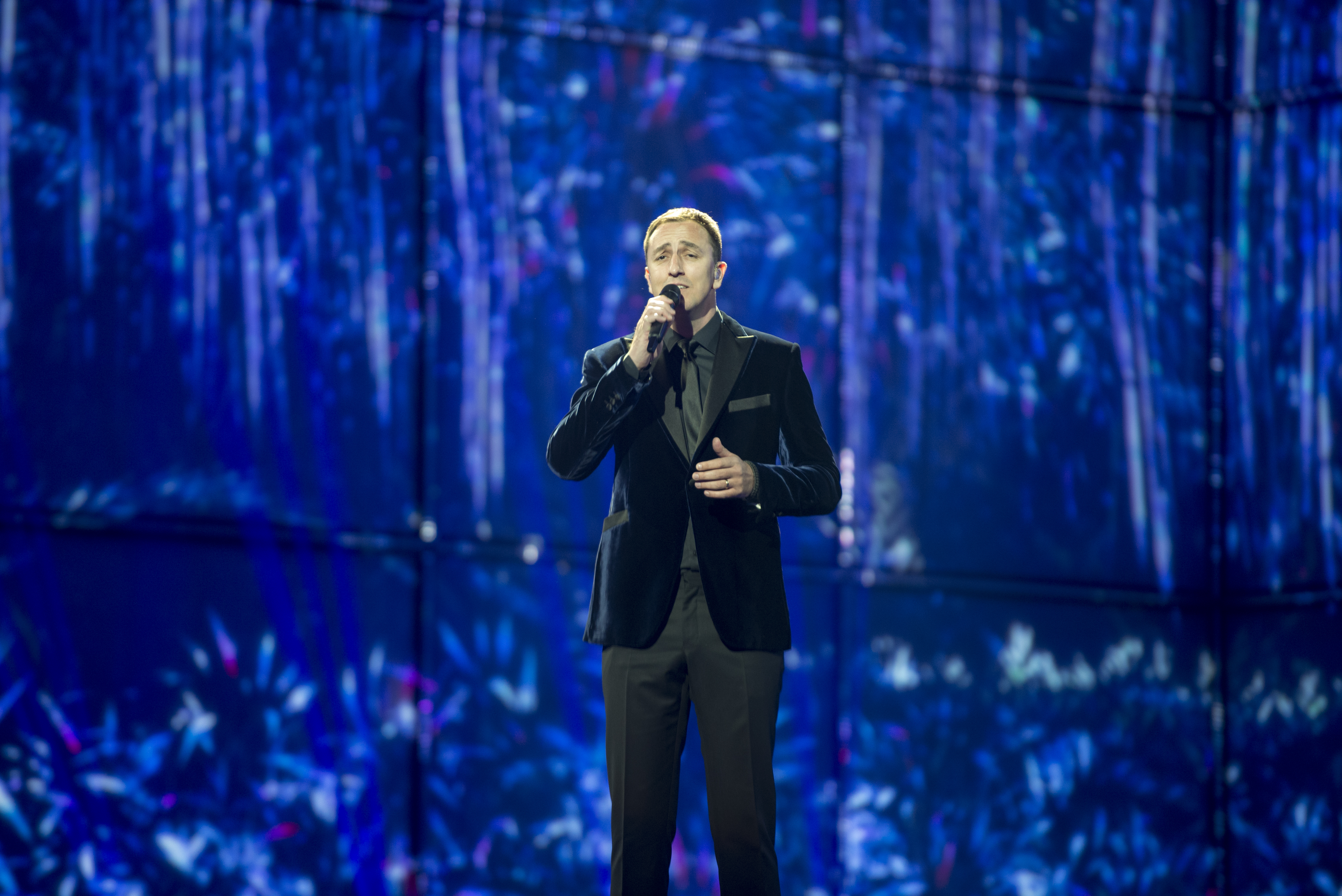
Sergej Ćetković in Copenhagen (2014)

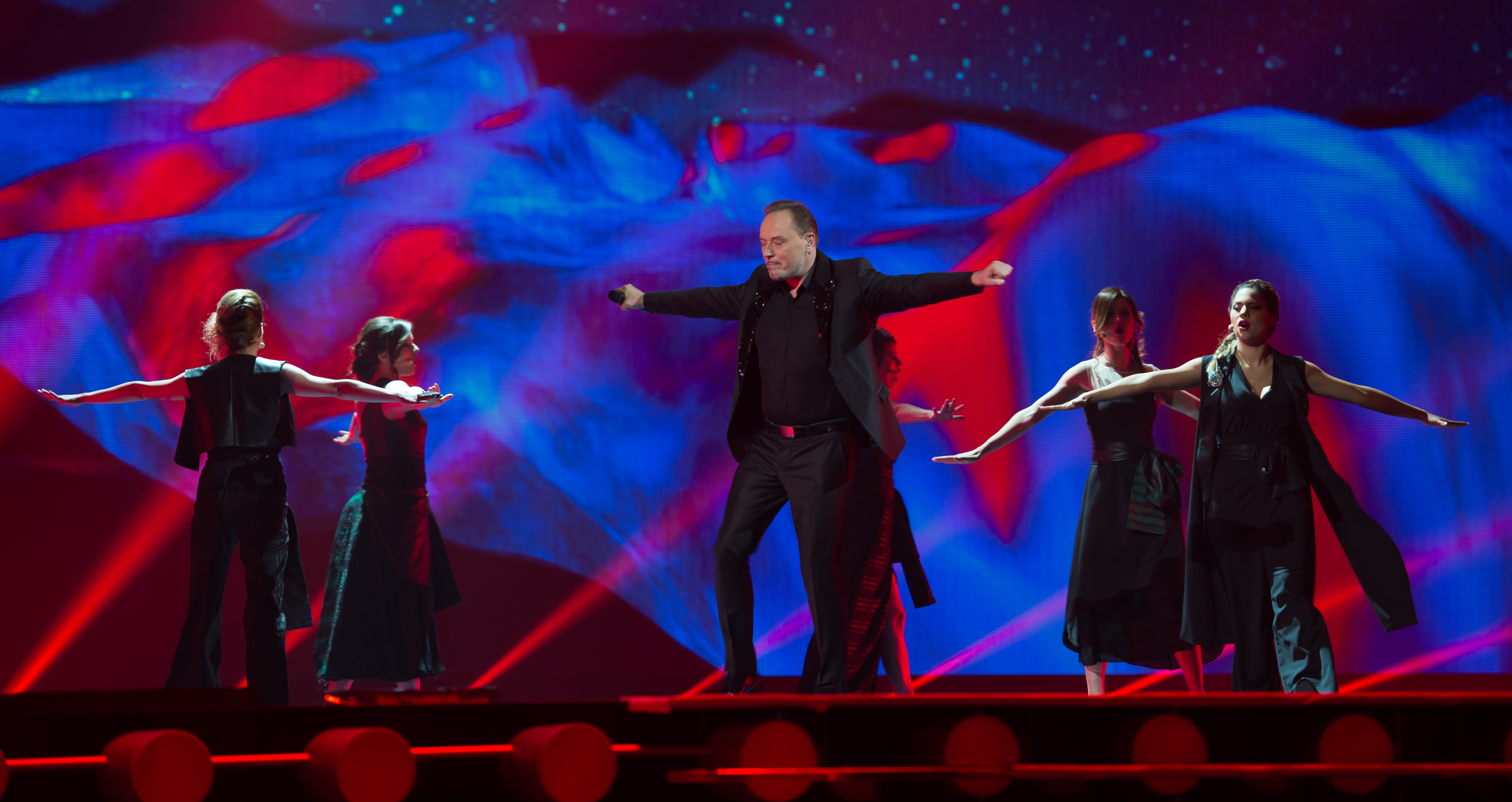
Knez in Vienna (2015)

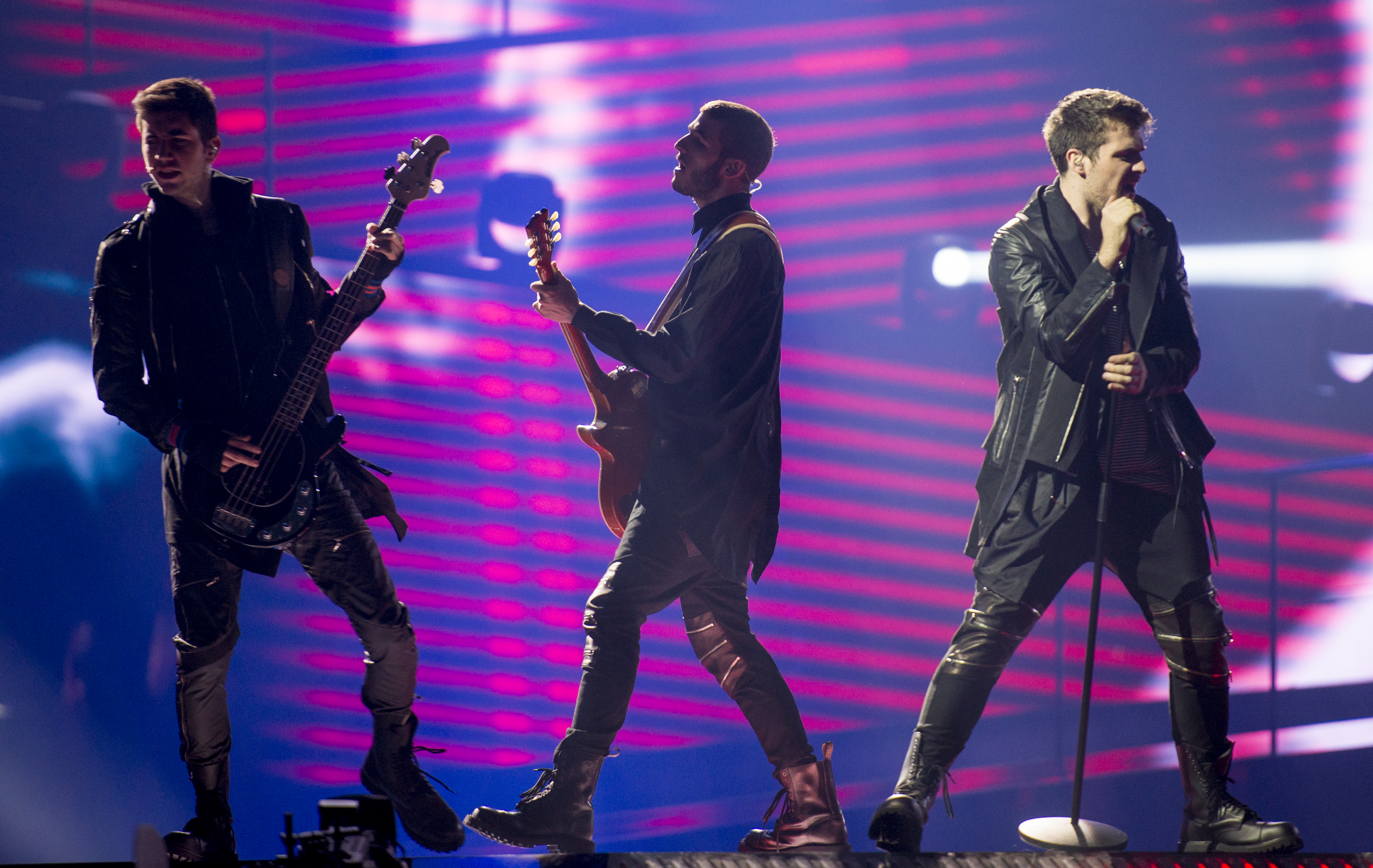
Highway in Stockholm (2016)

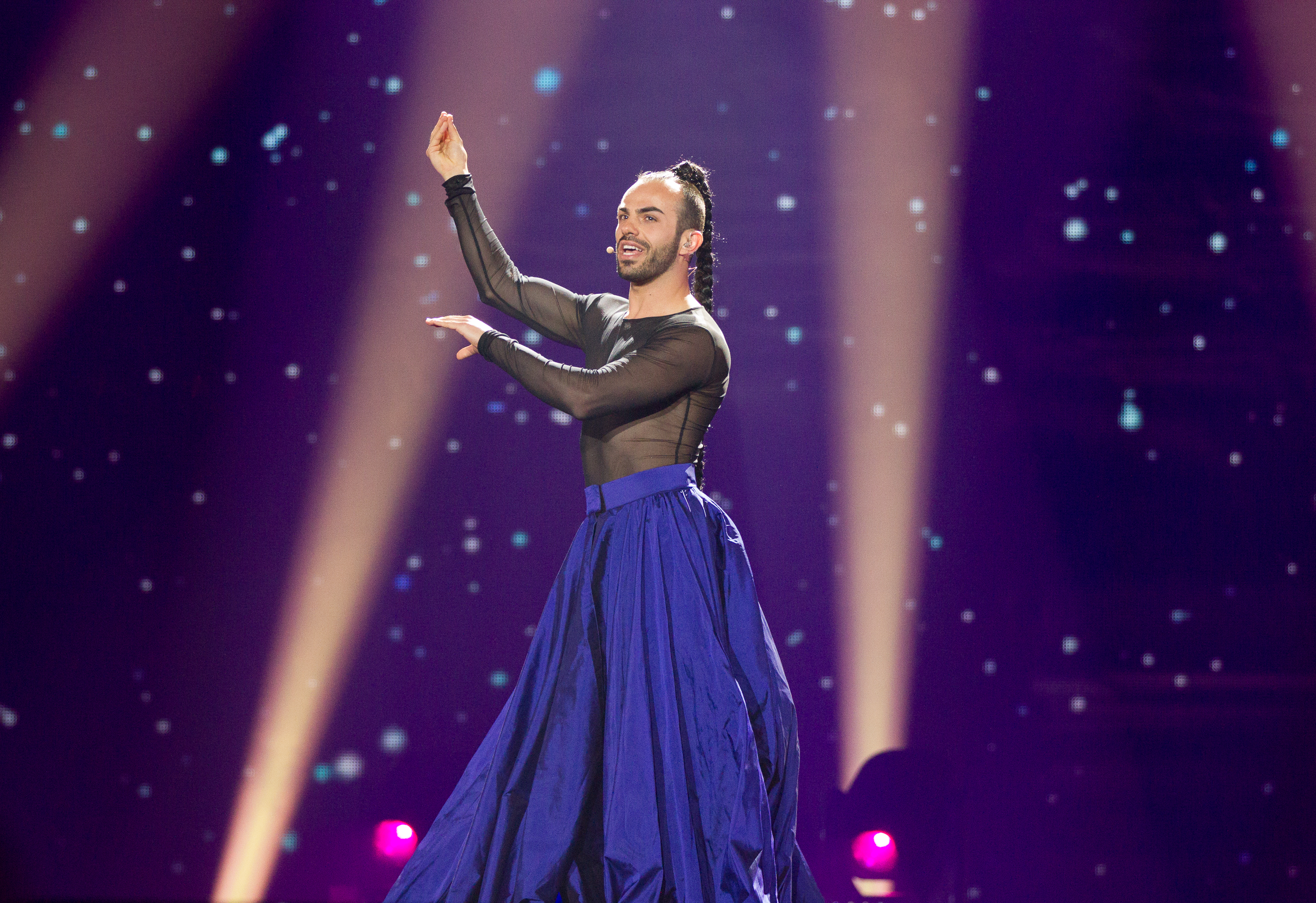
Slavko Kalezić in Kyiv (2017)

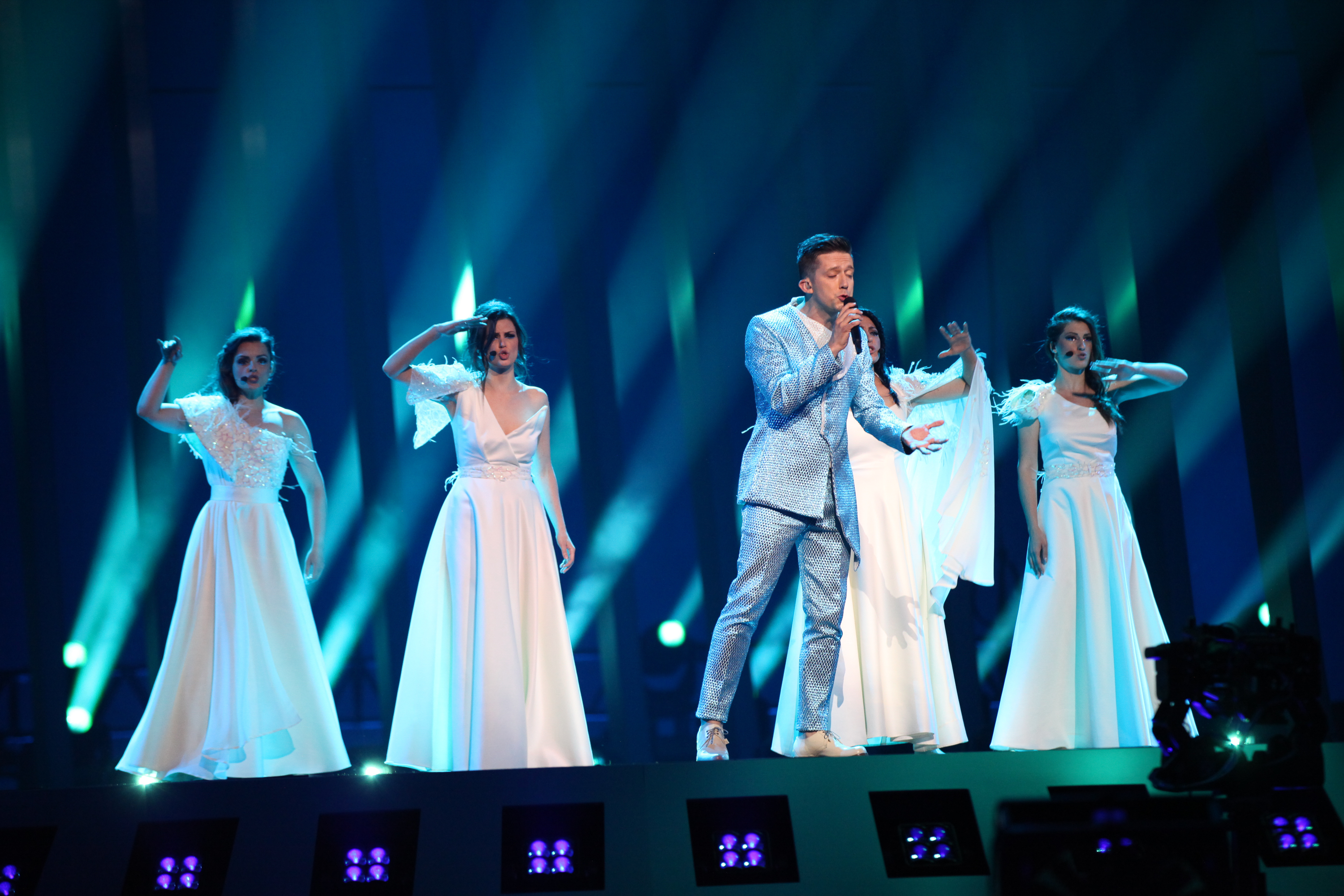
Vanja Radovanović in Lisbon (2018)

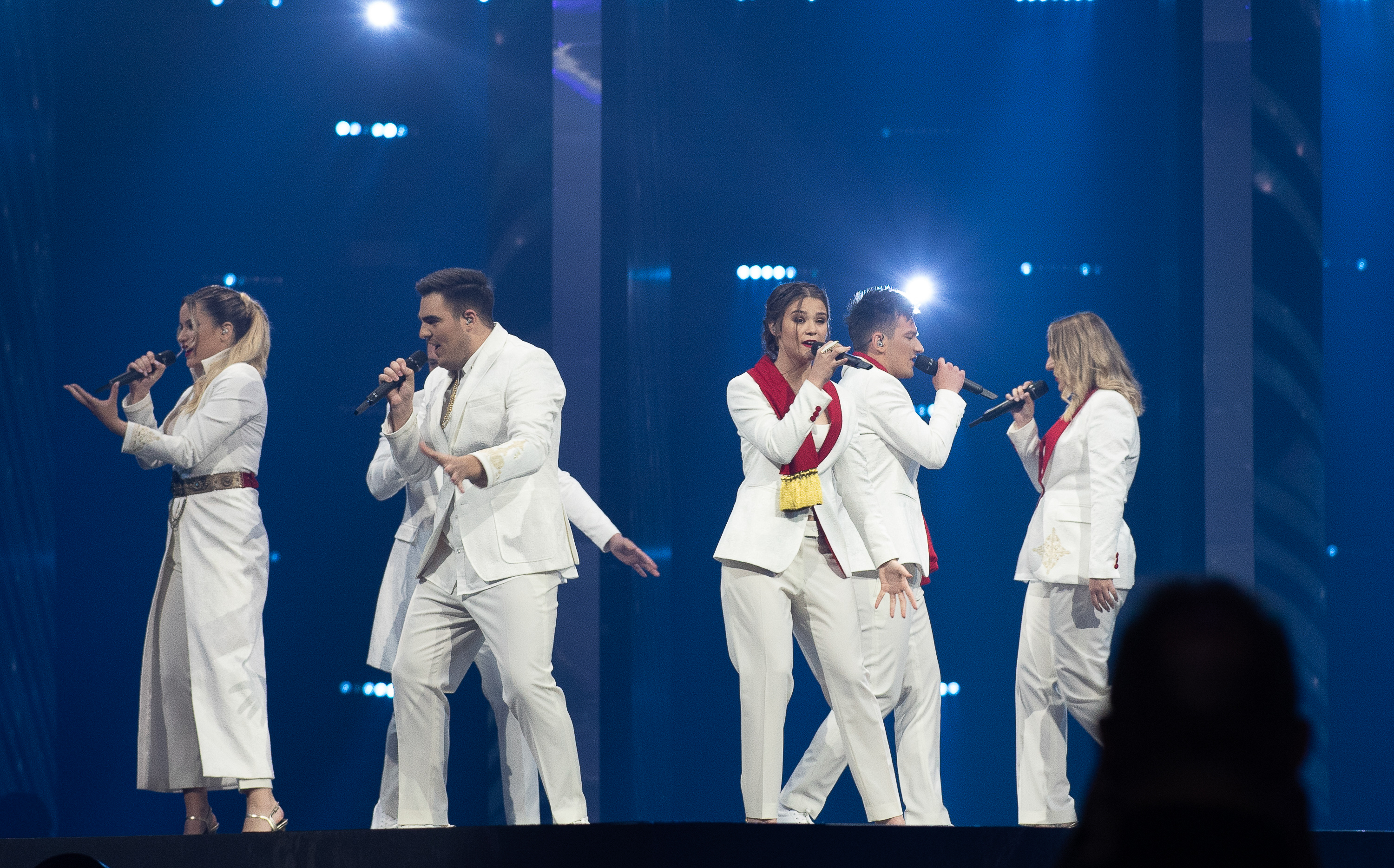
D mol in Tel Aviv (2019)

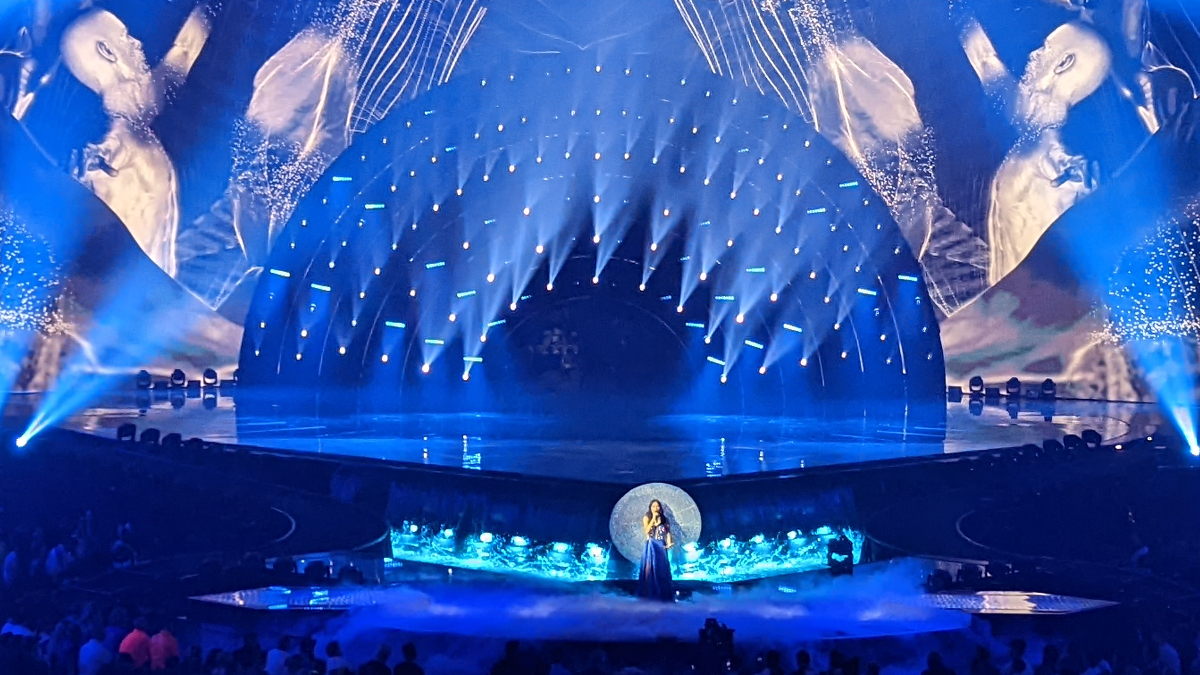
Vladana in Turin (2022)

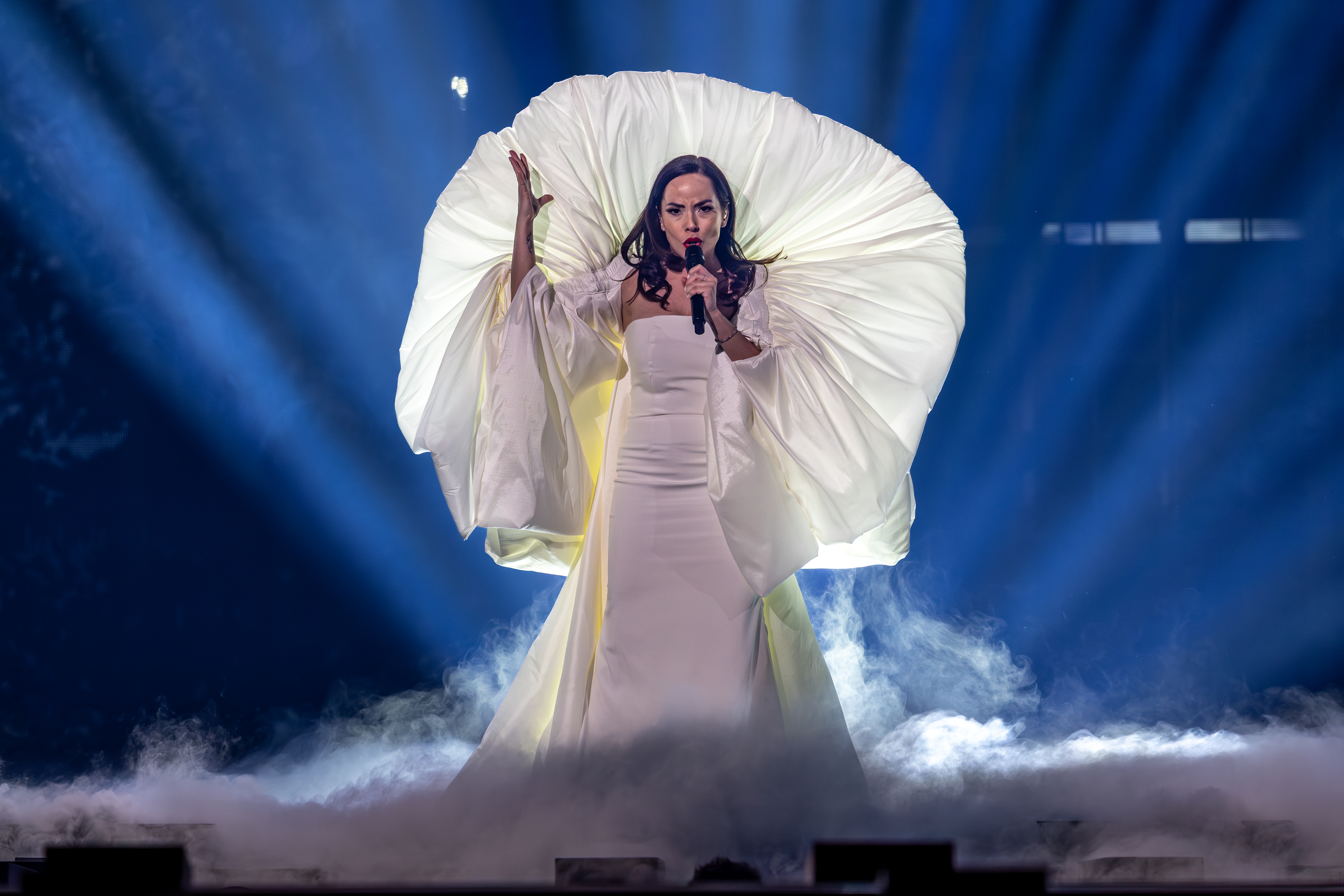
Nina Žižić in Basel (2025)

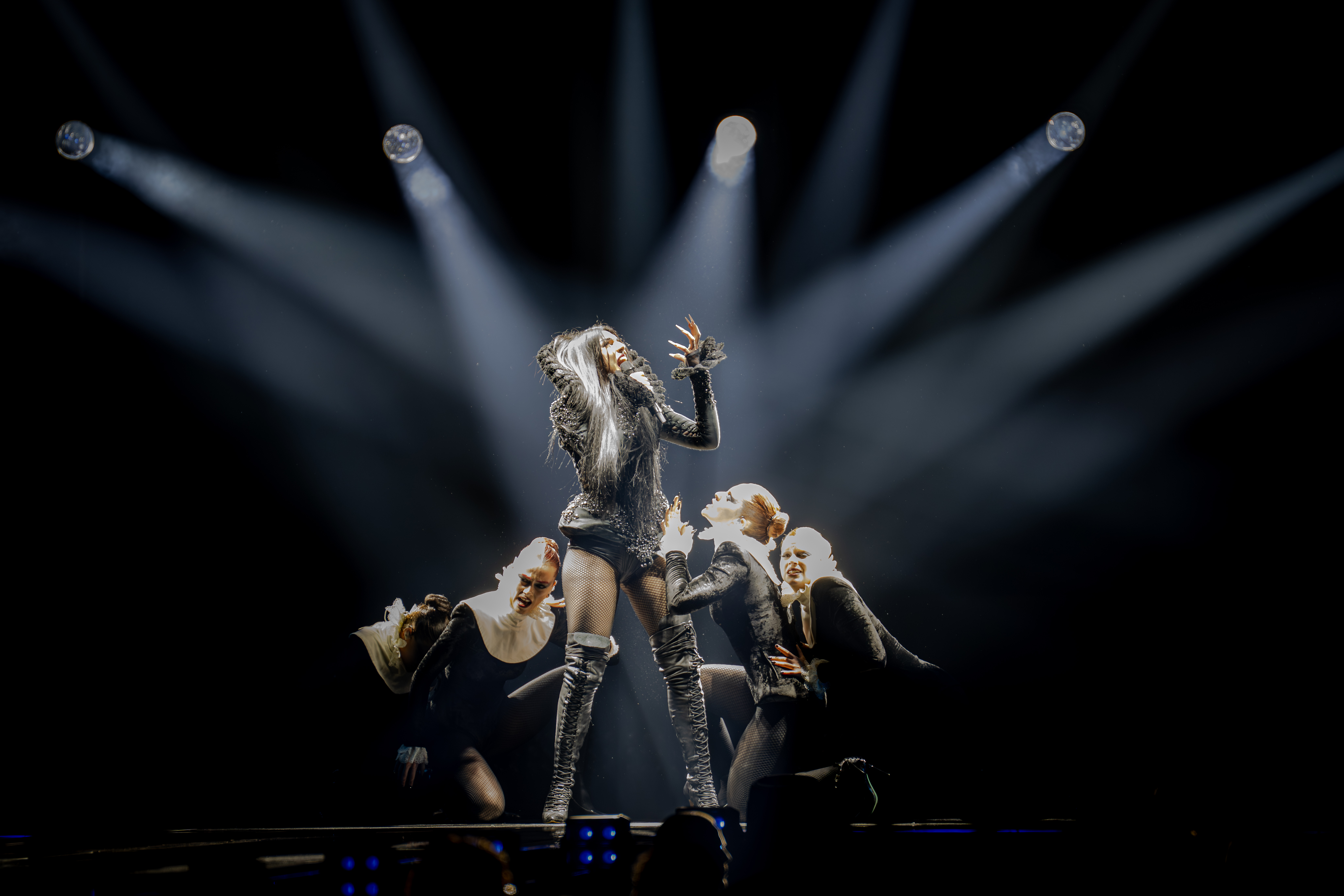
Tamara Živković in Vienna (2026)

== See also ==
- Montenegro in the Junior Eurovision Song Contest
- Serbia and Montenegro in the Eurovision Song Contest
- Yugoslavia in the Eurovision Song Contest
