= Nova zora =

2025 song by Tamara Živković

Single by Tamara Živković
- Language: Montenegrin
- English title: "New dawn"
- Released: 27 November 2025
- Length: 2:47 (original version); 2:51 (revamped version)
- Label: RTCG
- Songwriter: Boris Subotić
- Producers: Boris Subotić; Marko Dreznjak

Music video
- "Nova zora" on YouTube

Alternative cover
- Montesong 2025 cover

Eurovision Song Contest 2026 entry
- Country: Montenegro
- Artist: Tamara Živković
- Languages: Montenegrin
- Composer: Boris Subotić
- Lyricist: Boris Subotić

Finals performance
- Semi-final result: 13th
- Semi-final points: 71

Entry chronology
- ◄ "Dobrodošli" (2025)

Official performance video
- "Nova zora" (first semi-final) on YouTube

"Nova zora" (Montenegrin Cyrillic: Нова зора Montenegrin pronunciation: [ˈnɔʋa ˈzɔra]; transl. New dawn) is a song by Montenegrin singer Tamara Živković. The song represented Montenegro in the Eurovision Song Contest 2026 after winning the national final Montesong 2025. It was written by Boris Subotić and produced by Marko Dreznjak. The song talks about the pressure imposed on women and their strength. It placed 13th in Semi-Final 1 with 71 points, but it failed to qualify for the final. It received mixed reviews from critics, describing it as a dark, techno, gothic track that was contemporary but contained Balkan elements.

== Background and composition ==
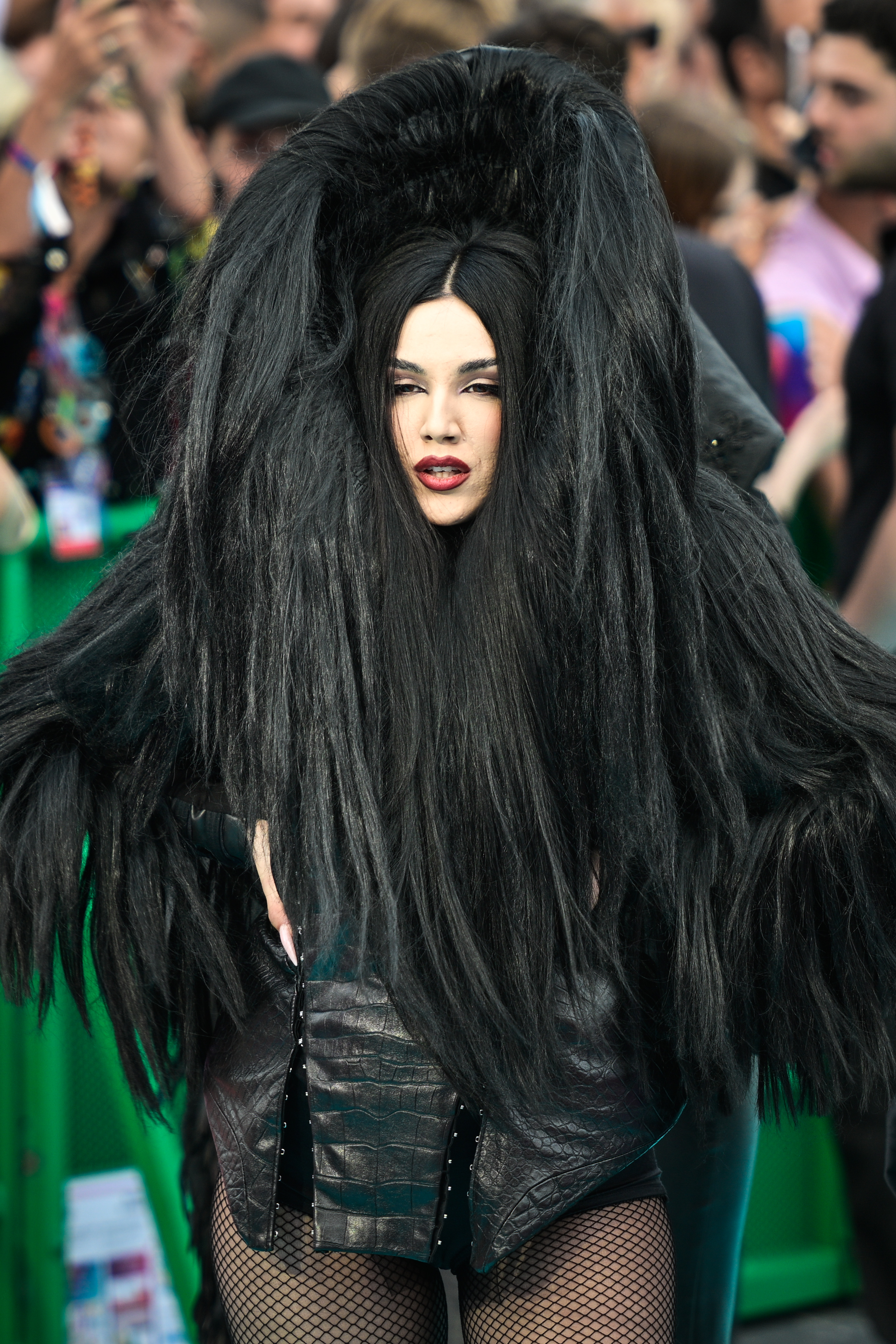
Živković at the Eurovision 2026 turquoise carpet on 10 May

"Nova zora" was written by Boris Subotić, the writer of Montenegro's 2025 Eurovision entry "Dobrodošli", and produced by Marko Dreznjak and Subotić. Živković participated in Montesong 2024 with the song "Poguban let", replacing Boban Rajović, who withdrew from the competition. She gained ninth place with six points entirely from the jury. Živković said that her prior experience in Montesong taught her what to do and gave her a better understanding of what to talk about, adding that she changed her genre to electronic as a result of development, stating that she did not want to have the same genre and had adjusted genres through the song's message. According to Živković, the song was sung fully in Montenegrin, as "that's where the emotion is the strongest. Even if people don't understand every word, they feel it, and that's more important", with the song's mission being to let the world feel the "power of women". In an interview with outlet Glavcom on the size of Montenegro, she said, "The fact that Montenegro is a small country has both its pros and cons. The possibilities may be more limited, but it also encourages you to be more inventive and create something real".

Živković said the song told about pressure imposed on women and the requirement to live by one's own rules, stating that, "When I say 'Nova Zora,' I don't mean the perfect beginning or moment, but the moment when you say to yourself—enough is enough. You don't have to please everyone, to fit in, or to pretend that it's easy for you". She said that the numerous references to weather represent the emotions of women, and the title "Nova zora", or "New dawn", represents a new beginning. Miguel Pons of ESCPlus opined that the song said the strength of women should not be taken for granted but respected instead, adding that the protagonist tries to "break free from the chains", and a new dawn represents a moment where the chains are finally broken. On the release of the song's final version on International Women's Day, Živković said, "we wanted it to be our small gift to all women, but also a message of support and motivation".

== Release and promotion ==
The 15 songs participating in Montesong 2025 were released on 27 November, including "Nova zora". After her selection for Eurovision, the song was re-released on 8 March alongside a music video made by Dalibor Ivanković and Subotić, coinciding with International Women's Day. In the new version, the song was more polished and fresh, with a stronger and more energetic sound building upon the existing arrangement, Živković said. In an interview with Vijesti, she revealed that a music video was recorded for Montesong, but the team chose to record another video after her victory. As her team was in charge of the video, Živković was "certain that the whole process would proceed in a wonderful atmosphere and creative mood." Her dancers also appeared in the video. To promote "Nova zora" before the Eurovision Song Contest 2026, Živković participated in various Eurovision pre-parties. She performed at Melfest WKND 2026 held at Nalen in Stockholm on 6 March 2026. She also participated at the Nordic Eurovision Party 2026 at Rockefeller in Oslo on 21 March 2026. Furthermore, she performed at Eurovision in Concert 2026 held at AFAS Live Arena in Amsterdam on 11 April 2026 and the London Eurovision Party on 19 April 2026, one of the 25 to do so.

== Critical reception ==
Eva Frantz of Yle gave the song a rating of seven out of 10, calling Živković "cool" and complimenting her "powerful voice". She also expressed her desire for Živković to be the first female Eurovision finalist for Montenegro. Jon O'Brien from Vulture ranked the entry 13th out of the 35 entries, describing it as an "adrenaline-charged blend of EDM, Balkan pop, and classical". Deban Deban of Wiwibloggs said that her Montesong outfit was "warrior type", adding that she was too powerful vocally and that she needed to restrain her voice as she sounded too "exposed". Deban was dismayed at back-to-back female empowerment themes representing Montenegro, questioning if other themes could represent the country, but still reacted positively to the song, adding that it was "upbeat and sassy", unlike "soaring, wailing" ballads. William Lee Adams of Wiwibloggs said that the song was similar to Halloween, stating that it sounded like "dark, gothic horror" and contained "warrior chants" that he liked. Adams added that the song sounded like "Balkan Club culture" and was unexpected to hear in Montesong.

In the Norwegian newspaper Dagbladet, Ralf Lofstad gave the song a one out of six, criticizing its staging for being "too dark" and Živković's vocals for being "consistently sour". Mark Savage of BBC described the song as "maximalist," utilizing a choir merged onto a "jackhammer" beat, adding that "Fans of Lady Gaga will enjoy the gothic staging" while questioning if this song would break Montenegro's non-qualification streak. Doron Lahav of ESC Beat said that the song was "techno trap pop" combined with her unique voice, adding that the instrumentals utilized growing beats in the first verse, fast and short drums in the pre-chorus, and electronic beats returning in the chorus. The pre-chorus has a dramatic choir singing, according to Lahav, and the second verse has fast vocals and soul mannerisms. Overall, Lahav rated it 3rd out of all 35 entries, stating that it is one of the strongest songs in the lineup, containing "dramatic" elements with a "modern and contemporary" touch. He added that the beats and the phrase "Nova zora" were catchy, and it could be one of Montenegro's best results yet. In ESCBubble's Public Reacts for semi-final 1 utilizing polls, Montenegro placed 9th out of the 15 total ranked songs. According to Pero Jovović of Danas, "Nova zora" was based on a "contemporary pop expression with elements of Balkan musical tradition, which fits into the broader Eurovision trend of recent years—combining local identity and modern production."

== Eurovision Song Contest ==
=== Montesong 2025 ===
On 14 October 2025, "Nova zora" was announced as one of the 15 songs selected for Montesong 2025. Songs should not have been performed before 1 September, must comply with Eurovision rules, and the performer must be Montenegrin. The finalists were selected through a committee consisting of music creators and performers; submitted songs were scored from 100, and songs that scored 75 or higher would be eligible to join the competition until at least 16 songs were selected. "Nova zora" was made available to the public on 27 November 2025. The results would be decided by public votes (50%) and jury votes (50%), of which the public vote will be split by SMS voting (25%) and online voting (25%). On 21 December, in the final, the song won first place in the jury vote and second place in the televote, gaining 22 points in total, enough points to earn the victory and granting Živković the right to represent Montenegro at the Eurovision Song Contest 2026 in Vienna.

=== At Eurovision ===
The Eurovision Song Contest 2026 took place at Wiener Stadthalle in Vienna, Austria, and consisted of two semi-finals held on the respective dates of 12 and 14 May and the final on 16 May 2026. During the allocation draw held on 12 January 2026, Montenegro was drawn to compete in the first semi-final, performing in the second half of the show. Živković was later drawn to perform eighth, after Finland's Linda Lampenius and Pete Parkkonen and before Estonia's Vanilla Ninja.

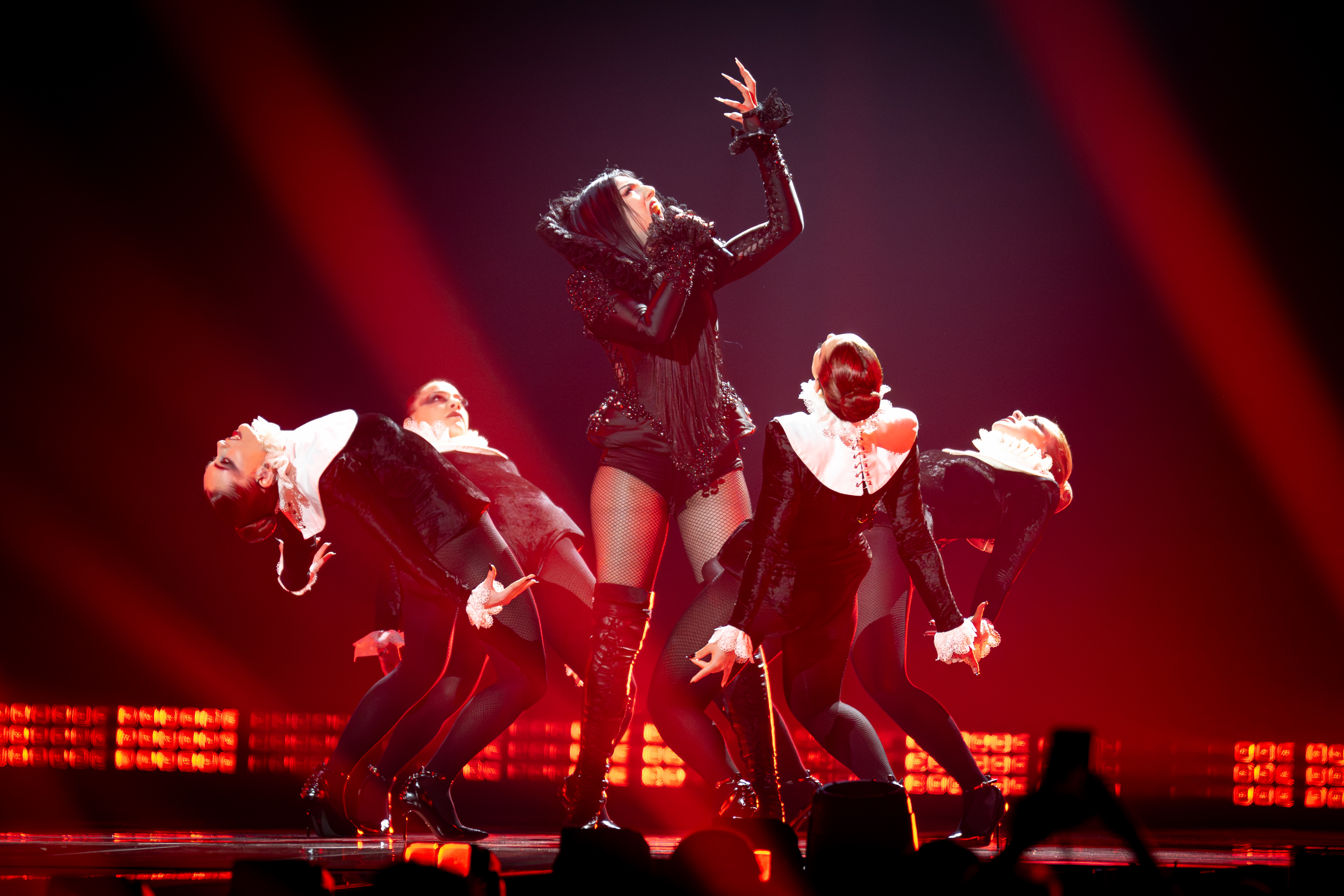
Živković performing "Nova zora" at the first semi-final

Živković wore a tight, black outfit with a large, puffy round collar bejeweled in black gems; her dancers are dressed the same but with white collars instead. The stage lighting was directed by Black Skull Creative. The performance took place in three acts: Act I, II, and III, which were shown to the audience using the LED screens. Her performance started with her being dragged across the floor by four figures; Živković eventually contorts herself and starts standing. Initially at a distance, the camera slowly zooms in on her during the performance, with her dancers holding hands and circling her as she looks up towards the camera. The camera then concentrates on Živković's hands with quick shots taken in multiple directions, with intimidating stares from the dancers. The chorus then ends, and she and the dancers look at the camera and sing the final line of the chorus. Živković did not qualify for the grand final, gaining 13th out of 15 entries with 71 points: 26 from the jury (13th) and 45 from the televote (10th). The highest points Montenegro received from a country were 8 from Greece in the jury and 10 from Serbia and Croatia in the televote.

Ilay Gaist of EuroMix said that the broadcaster has "clearly opted for a high-concept approach this year", describing the performance as a "dark and theatrical show" that is a "definitive play for the Grand Final". After her performance in the second rehearsals, she said that it was a "wonderful experience. I am very satisfied with the performance. Of course, many changes and refinements await us, but the production understood the idea of 'Nova Zora' and our feeling. My feeling and that of my girls on stage is really wonderful." Adriana Rama of ESCToday said about the performance, "Throughout each act, we see our quintet of queens partake in some very intricate choreography, which ranges from the maniacal to the impressively synced. It's difficult to pinpoint a favourite part because every new formation is so different to the last. And so eye-popping, too".

== Credits and personnel ==
Credits are adapted from Apple Music (Great Britain).

- Tamara Živković – vocals
- Boris Subotić – lyrics, composer, producer
- Marko Drežnjak – arranger, producer
- Sava Tomic – mixing engineer, mastering engineer
