= Vladana Vučinić =

Vladana Vučinić Владана Вучинић
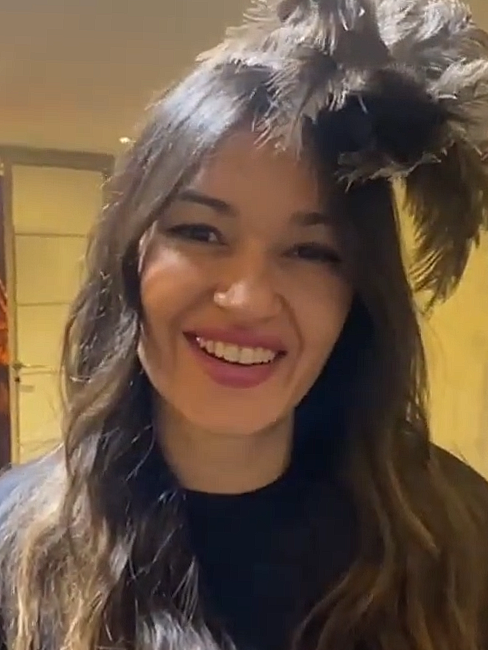
- Vučinić in 2022

Background information
- Born: Vladana Vučinić; 18 July 1986 (age 39); Titograd, SR Montenegro, SFR Yugoslavia
- Occupations: Singer, songwriter
- Years active: 2003–present

Vladana Vučinić (Montenegrin: Владана Вучинић, pronounced [vlǎdana vǔtʃinitɕ]; born 18 July 1986), also known mononymously as Vladana, is a Montenegrin singer and songwriter. She represented Montenegro in the Eurovision Song Contest 2022 with the song "Breathe".

She worked as a creative director at Radio and Television of Montenegro.

== Life and career ==
Vladana showed interest in music at an early age as her grandfather, Boris Nizamovski was the Head of the Association of Stage Artists of North Macedonia and manager of the Macedonian ensemble Magnifico. Vladana studied music theory and opera singing in secondary school graduated with a degree in journalism from the Montenegro's State Faculty of Political Science.

In 2003, Vladana made her television debut on a national karaoke show. She released her debut single "Ostaćeš mi vječna ljubav" and performed at Budva Mediterranean Festival in Budva, Montenegro. On 3 March 2005, Vučinić participated in Montevizija 2005 with the song "Samo moj nikad njen" but failed to advance to Evropesma-Europjesma 2005 held on 4 March 2005. In 2006, she participated in Montevizija 2006 as a duet with Bojana Nenezić with the song "Željna". They advanced into the final where they placed 15th overall. Later that year, Vučinić performed her song "Kapije od zlata" at the newcomers section of the music festival Sunčane skale.

Vladana is the first solo performer from Montenegro broadcast on the regional MTV station MTV Adria.

She launched an online fashion magazine called Chiwelook (Čiviluk) based on editorials with fashion designers from Montenegro. As a founder and editor in chief, she contributed to the magazine through columns and interviews about fashion with different figures in music, culture and politics.

On 4 January 2022, it was announced that she had been selected by the Montenegrin broadcaster RTCG to represent Montenegro in the Eurovision Song Contest 2022. A day later, on 5 January 2022, it was announced that her Eurovision entry will be titled "Breathe" and performed in English. The song was released on 4 March 2022 alongside a music video. At Eurovision in Turin, she performed in second semi-final on 12 May 2022, but failed to qualify to the grand final. The song was later recorded and released in Finnish ("Jää"/Stay) and Italian ("Respira"/Breathe).

In 2024, she was the TV host of Montesong, but her appearance was marked by frequent slips of the tongue, mispronounced words, and disjointed sentences. Vučinić resigned from RTCG the day after the national final and made her decision public on 5 December, citing a lack of transparency in the organisation of the national final. However, Vučinić remained as head of delegation for Montenegro at the Eurovision Song Contest 2025.

== Discography ==
=== Studio albums ===
Title	Details
Sinner City	Released: 15 December 2010; Label: self-released; Formats: Digital download, streaming

=== Singles ===
Title	Year	Album
"Ostaćeš mi vječna ljubav"	2003	Non-album singles
"Noć"	2004	Non-album singles
"Samo moj nikad njen"	2005	Non-album singles
"Nježna" (with Bojana Nenezić)	2006	Non-album singles
"Kao miris kokosa"	2006	Non-album singles
"Kapije od zlata"	2006	Non-album singles
"Poljubac kao doručak"	2007	Non-album singles
"Bad Girls Need Love Too"	2009	Sinner City
"Sinner City"	2010	Sinner City
"Breathe"	2022	Non-album singles
"Jää"	2022	Non-album singles
"Prevarena"	2022	Non-album singles
"—" denotes a recording that did not chart or was not released in that territory.

Preceded by D mol with "Heaven"	Montenegro in the Eurovision Song Contest; 2022	Succeeded by Nina Žižić with "Dobrodošli"
