= Igranka =

2013 single by Who See and Nina Žižić

Single by Who See feat. Nina Žižić
- Language: Montenegrin
- Released: 14 February 2013
- Length: 2:54
- Label: Self-released

Eurovision Song Contest 2013 entry
- Country: Montenegro
- Artist: Who See
- Language: Montenegrin
- Composer: Wikluh Sky
- Lyricist: Who See

Finals performance
- Semi-final result: 12th
- Semi-final points: 41

Entry chronology
- ◄ "Euro Neuro" (2012)
- "Moj Svijet" (2014) ►

"Igranka" (pronounced [ǐɡraŋka]; transl. Dance party) is a song recorded by the Montenegrin hip-hop duo Who See. The song was written by Who See and Wikluh Sky. The song also features vocals from Montenegrin pop singer Nina Žižić. It was Montenegro's entry to the Eurovision Song Contest 2013 held in Malmö, Sweden. The song competed in the first semi-final on 14 May 2013 for a spot in the final on 18 May 2013, but did not qualify, coming twelfth in the semi-final, with forty-one points.

== Background ==
In an interview with the Eurovision Song Contest, the band stated that the song was a "typical hip-hop song with a voice of an angel... The idea was to spread positive energy with the song. So, we are singing about joy of life, partying and things we want and dream about."

== Release ==
The song was released during a television special titled on 14 February 2013. The show was televised on TVCG 1 and RTV Montenegro as well as broadcast online via the broadcaster's website rtcg.me and the official Eurovision Song Contest website eurovision.tv.

== Eurovision Song Contest ==
=== Selection ===
On 20 December 2012, RTCG announced that hip-hop duo Who See would represent Montenegro in Malmö. The duo consists of Dejan Dedović and Mario Đorđević. On 1 February 2013, RTCG announced that Nina Žižić would join the duo as a featured vocalist.

=== At Eurovision ===
Montenegro was allocated to compete in the first semi-final on 14 May for a place in the final on 18 May. In the first semifinal, the producers of the show decided that Montenegro would perform 9th, following the Netherlands and preceding Lithuania. This was the first time since 2007 that Montenegro was not drawn to open the semifinal during their participation. The Montenegrin performance featured the members of Who See dressed as astronauts, while Nina Žižić was dressed like a cyborg. Montenegro failed to qualify from the first semi-final of the competition, placing 12th and scoring 41 points.
