= Dolce Hera =

- Born: Aleksandra Prelević Palladino; 16 December 1991 (age 34); Podgorica, SR Montenegro, SFR Yugoslavia
- Origin: Rome, Italy
- Occupations: Drummer; singer
- Instrument: Drum kit
- Years active: 2007–present
- Formerly of: Shin-ei
- Website: dolcehera.com

Aleksandra Prelević Palladino (Montenegrin: Александра Прелевић Палладино; born 16 December 1991), known professionally as Dolce Hera, is a Montenegrin musician and former member of the rock band Shin-ei.

== Early life ==
Prelević Palladino was born in Podgorica on 16 December 1991. There, she studied at the Vasa Pavić Musical School and graduated from the University of Montenegro Faculty of Law and the Faculty of Foreign Languages of the Mediterranean University.

== Career ==
Prelević Palladino performed with Montenegrin drummer Dragoljub Đuričić at the Montenegrin National Theatre at his invitation. She became the drummer of the local punk rock band Shin-ei in 2007.

After a decade-long break, Prelević Palladino returned to music in 2023 by releasing the single "Common Dreams", featuring Nina Žižić, for an upcoming album. It was accompanied by a music video directed by Đorđe Jovanović and Jovan Dudić and costumed by fashion designer Ana Krgović. By July, it had surpassed 100,000 views on YouTube.

On 27 October 2023, Prelević Palladino released a second single, "Sweet and Bizarre", featuring Vladana Vučinić. The song was written in February with lyrics in Italian and it was accompanied by a music video which she directed. She performed at the Rubix Festival on 9 August 2024.

On 10 October 2024, Radio and Television of Montenegro announced that it had selected Prelević Palladino's "Repeat" as one of the songs to compete in Montesong 2024, the national final that it would organise to select its entry for the Eurovision Song Contest 2025. A panel of reviewers for ESCYounited gave the song an average score of 5.0 out of 10. CDM.me considered her performance to be among the more creative in the contest. In November, she released a third single "Trivial Lovers", again accompanied by a music video she directed. She had also been awarded a scholarship from the Miloš Karadaglić Foundation earlier that year.

== Discography ==
=== Studio albums ===
Title	Details	Peak chart positions	Sales
Title	Details	MNE	Sales
D.H. Vol 4	Scheduled: TBA; Label: Independently released; Formats: TBA	TBA	TBA

=== Singles ===
Title	Year	Album
"Common Dreams" (featuring Nina Žižić)	2023	Non-album singles
"Sweet and Bizarre" (featuring Vladana Vučinić)	2023	Non-album singles
"Trivial Lovers"	2024	Non-album singles
"Repeat"	2024	Non-album singles
"Star Kids"	2025	Non-album singles
"Casanova 91"	2025	Non-album singles

== Videography ==
=== Music videos ===
Year	Title	Director(s)	References
2023	"Common Dreams" (featuring Nina Žižić)	Đorđe Jovanović	
2023	"Sweet & Bizarre" (featuring Vladana Vučinić)	Herself	
2024	"Trivial Lovers"	Herself	
