= Nina Žižić =

Montenegrin singer (born 1985)

Nina Žižić Нина Жижић
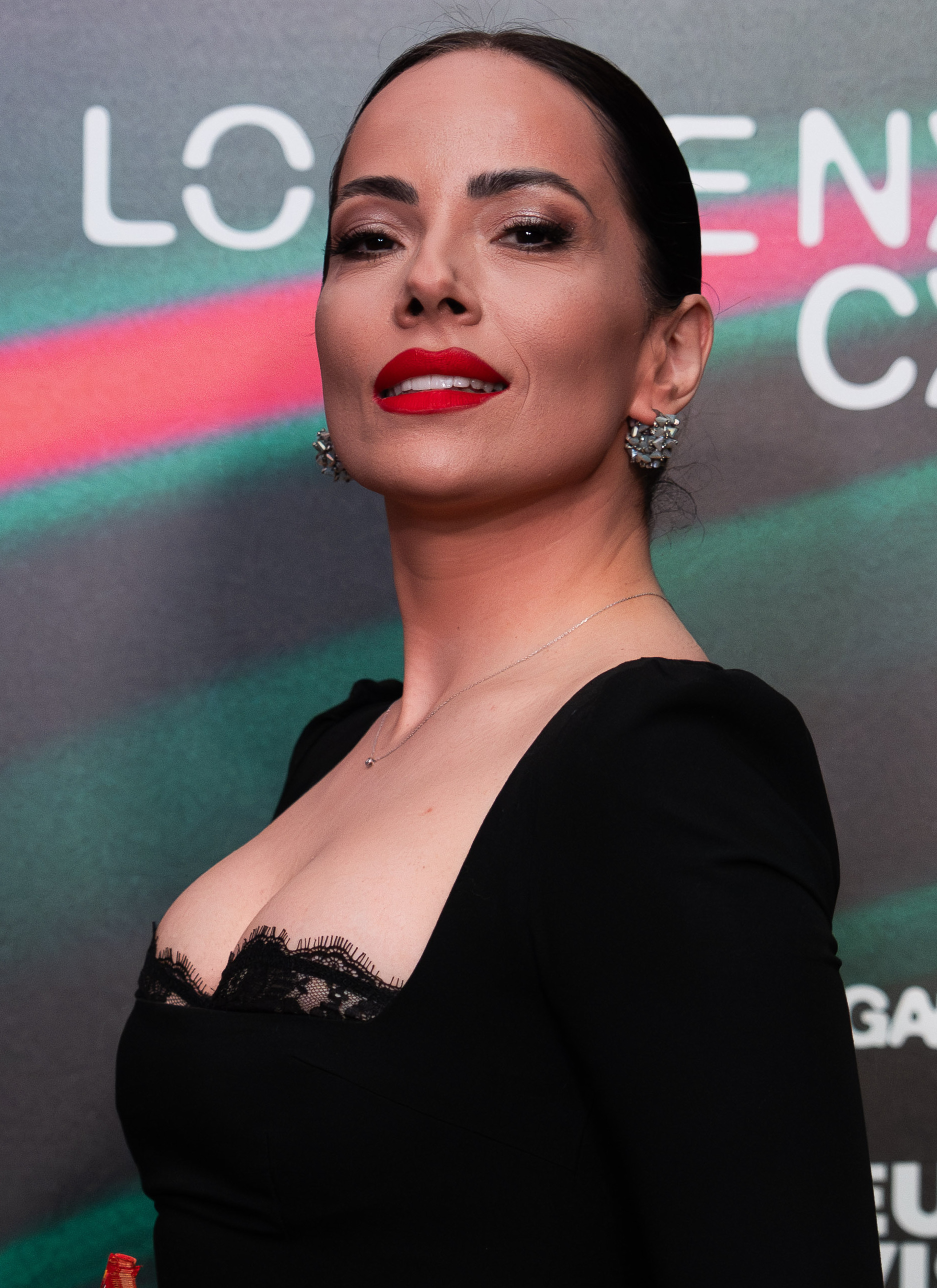
- Nina Žižić in 2025

Background information
- Born: 20 April 1985 (age 41); Nikšić, SR Montenegro, Yugoslavia
- Genres: Pop
- Occupation: Singer
- Instrument: Vocals
- Years active: 2004–present

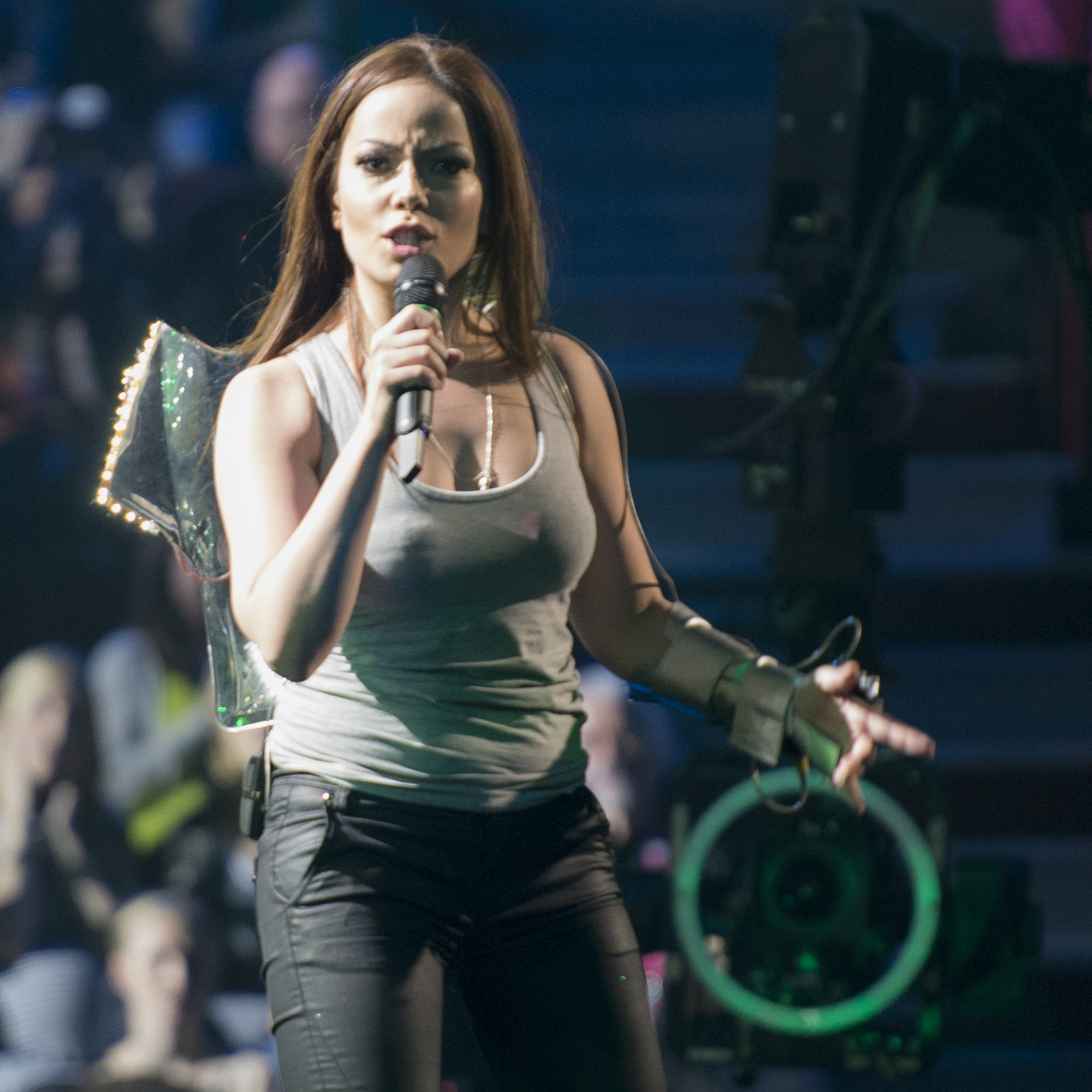
Nina Žižić at dress rehearsal for Eurovision Song Contest 2013

Nina Žižić (Montenegrin: Нина Жижић, pronounced [nîna ʒǐʒit͡ɕ]; born 20 April 1985) is a Montenegrin singer. She began her career in 2004 with the group Negre. She first represented Montenegro in the Eurovision Song Contest 2013 alongside Who See with the song "Igranka" and did so again in the 2025 contest with the song "Dobrodošli".

== Career ==
In December 2012, RTCG announced that Who See would represent Montenegro in the Eurovision Song Contest 2013 held in Malmö together with a "secret artist", who was later revealed to be Žižić. Their entry was the song "Igranka". The song was performed in the first semi-final on 14 May 2013, but came 12th with 41 points, failing to qualify for the final.

In 2021, Žižić was a member of the internal jury to select Montenegro's entry for the Eurovision Song Contest 2022.

Žižić participated in Montesong 2024, the Montenegrin national final for the Eurovision Song Contest 2025, with the song "Dobrodošli", finishing second to Neonoen with "Clickbait". However, Neonoen withdrew on 4 December 2024 due to having previously performed their entry in 2023, a violation of the rules. On 8 December 2024, Žižić was announced to be chosen as the Montenegrin representative in the contest instead. She competed on 15 May 2025 in semifinal 2 and failed to qualify for the grand final.

In November 2025, Žižić was nominated for the Eurovision Awards in the #ALBM Cover of the Year category for her cover of the song "Marija Magdalena" by Croatian Eurovision representative Doris Dragović. In December of the same year, she won the Hit of the Year award for the song "Dobrodošli" at the Montefon Awards.

== Discography ==
=== Singles ===
Title	Year	Album
"Rijeka suza"	2006	Non-album singles
"Potraži me"	2006	Non-album singles
"Strogo povjerljivo"	2007	Non-album singles
"Druga u meni"	2008	Non-album singles
"Sve što želim"	2008	Non-album singles
"Ja te moliti neću"	2009	Non-album singles
"Zabranjujem"	2011	Non-album singles
"Odlazi"	2012	Non-album singles
"Sama kriva"	2013	Non-album singles
"Klik" (with Wikluh Sky)	2013	Non-album singles
"Kiss you, goodbye"	2016	Music for the movie Too Many Coincidences
"Paranoičan"	2023	Non-album singles
"Dobrodošli"	2024	Non-album singles

=== Guest appearances ===
Title	Year	Other artist(s)	Album
"Igranka"	2013	Who See	Non-album singles
"Common Dreams"	2023	Dolce Hera	Non-album singles

== Awards and nominations ==
Year	Award	Category	Nominee(s)	Result	Ref.
2025	Montefon Awards	Hit of the year	"Dobrodošli"	Won	
2025	Eurovision Awards	#ALBM Cover of the Year	"Marija Magdalena" (Doris Dragović cover)	Nominated	

Awards and achievements
Preceded by Rambo Amadeus with "Euro Neuro"	Montenegro in the Eurovision Song Contest; 2013; With: Who See	Succeeded by Sergej Ćetković with "Moj svijet"
Preceded by Vladana with "Breathe"	Montenegro in the Eurovision Song Contest; 2025	Succeeded by Tamara Živković with "Nova zora"
