= Euro Neuro =

2012 song by Rambo Amadeus

Single by Rambo Amadeus
- Language: English, Montenegrin
- Released: 15 March 2012
- Length: 3:04
- Label: Self-released
- Songwriter: Antonije Pušić

Music video
- "Euro Neuro" on YouTube

Eurovision Song Contest 2012 entry
- Country: Montenegro
- Artist: Rambo Amadeus

Finals performance
- Semi-final result: 15th
- Semi-final points: 20

Entry chronology
- ◄ "Just Get Out of My Life" (2009)
- "Igranka" (2013) ►

Official performance video
- "Euro Neuro" on YouTube

"Euro Neuro" is a song by Montenegrin singer Rambo Amadeus. The song was internally chosen to represent Montenegro in the Eurovision Song Contest 2012; it was the first song performed at the contest in the first semi-final and failed to advance to the final. "Euro Neuro" is primarily sung in English, with some phrases in Montenegrin and German.

== Background ==
The song is regarded as a satire towards the relations between Montenegro and the European Union, and the European Union in general. During the time when "Euro Neuro" was made, Europe was suffering from a debt crisis. In response, Rambo said "The EU and euro are in some kind of neurotic situation, so I wanted to help. [However, 'Euro Neuro' is] is not a cure. It is just a diagnosis. 'Euro Neuro' is a diagnostic song with therapeutic side effects."

== Release ==
The song was premiered on 15 March 2012 on a television special hosted by Sabrija Vulić. The show was televised on TVCG 1 and RTV Montenegro as well as broadcast online via the broadcaster's website rtcg.me.

== Music video ==
The music video for the song was released on the same day on Rambo Amadeus' YouTube channel. The video features symbolic representations that mock the European Union's financial crisis, along with the lyrics of the song.

== Eurovision Song Contest ==
=== Selection ===
On 12 December 2011, RTCG announced that Rambo Amadeus would represent Montenegro in Baku. According to Rambo, he initially did not want to compete in Eurovision, but once asked by RTCG, he felt more pride for being Montenegro's entrant.

=== Eurovision Song Contest ===
During the Semi-Final Allocation draw which was held on 25 January 2012, it was announced Montenegro were scheduled to compete on the first half of the first semi-final on 22 May. On 20 March 2012, the running order draw was held, which determined the order of which the participants performed. Montenegro was set to perform first on the first semi-final. During the semi-final, Amadeus would fail to qualify for the final, only scoring 20 points, and finishing in 15th.

== Reception ==
Reception during the first and second rehearsals was negative. William Lee Adams of Wiwibloggs had said after the first rehearsal "It looks like the recession has hit Montenegro hard... I can't make out any of the words that are coming out of Rambo's mouth with the drums and blaring horns in the background. It's just a bunch of random noise and rambling. The donkey that contributed to the fame of the song was also on stage, but it wasn't a real one. I think the prop is completely useless if Rambo is not going to ride it." Adams would have more negative words during the second rehearsals, saying "Amadeus opened up the second rehearsals today with another appalling performance... This is seriously one of the worst songs I've heard at Eurovision in a long time. I'm all about making things deep, but I don't need my ears to bleed in the process."
