= Boris Subotić =

Serbian singer-songwriter (born 2001)

Boris Subotić Борис Суботић
- Born: 2001 (age 24–25); Sremska Mitrovica, Serbia, FR Yugoslavia
- Genres: Pop
- Occupations: Singer; songwriter
- Years active: 2006–present

Boris Subotić (Serbian Cyrillic: Борис Суботић; born 2001) is a Serbian singer, songwriter and musician. He is known for participating in the Pesma za Evroviziju, the Serbian national final for the Eurovision Song Contest in 2022 and 2023. Subotić co-wrote and produced the song Dobrodošli, which Nina Žižić performed as representative of Montenegro in the Eurovision Song Contest 2025.

== Early life and education ==
Subotić was born in 2001 in Sremska Mitrovica. He is a Faculty of Modern Arts student majoring in music production.

== Career ==
Subotić began singing at the age of five. In September 2010, he participated in the Serbian national selection for the Junior Eurovision Song Contest 2010 with the song "Do moje klupe." He finished in second place in the selection. He participated in the competitions, Ja imam talenat!, Vivkovizija, and Ja mogu sve, where he won.

In 2022, Subotić participated in the Pesma za Evroviziju '22, the Serbian national selection for the Eurovision Song Contest 2022, with the song "Vrati mi". He participated again in the Pesma za Evroviziju in 2023 with the song "Nedostupan".

== Discography ==
=== Singles ===
Name	Year	Аlbum
"Do moje klupe"	2010	Non-album singles
"Vrati mi"	2022	Non-album singles
"Skok do svemira"	2022	Non-album singles
"Nedostupan"	2023	Non-album singles
