= Radio 98 =

- Montenegro

Programming
- Format: Public

Ownership
- Owner: Radio Televizija Crne Gore (RTCG)
- Sister stations: Radio Crne Gore

Links
- Website: www.rtcg.me

Radio 98 is a youth-oriented radio station in Montenegro. Its headquarters are in Podgorica.
