= Dobrodošli =

2024 song by Nina Žižić

- Original single cover

Single by Nina Žižić
- Language: Montenegrin
- English title: Welcome
- Released: 10 November 2024
- Genre: Pop; ballad
- Length: 3:00 (original version); 3:23 (revamped version)
- Label: RTCG
- Songwriters: Boris Subotić; Violeta Mihajlovska Milić; Darko Dimitrov
- Producer: Darko Dimitrov

Nina Žižić singles chronology
"Paranoičan" (2023)	"Dobrodošli" (2024)

Music video
- "Dobrodošli" (Montesong version) on YouTube

Music video
- "Dobrodošli" (Revamped version) on YouTube

Alternative cover
- Cover of the revamped version of the song

Eurovision Song Contest 2025 entry
- Country: Montenegro
- Artist: Nina Žižić
- Composers: Boris Subotić; Darko Dimitrov
- Lyricists: Boris Subotić; Violeta Mihajlovska Milić

Finals performance
- Semi-final result: 16th
- Semi-final points: 12

Entry chronology
- ◄ "Breathe" (2022)
- "Nova zora" (2026) ►

"Dobrodošli" (Montenegrin Cyrillic: Добродошли, Montenegrin pronunciation: [dɔbrɔˈdɔʃli]; transl. Welcome) is a song by Montenegrin singer Nina Žižić. It was written by Boris Subotić, Violeta Mihajlovska Milić and Darko Dimitrov, the latter in whom also handled production. The song represented Montenegro in the Eurovision Song Contest 2025.

== Background and composition ==
The music for "Dobrodošli" was composed by Boris Subotić and Darko Dimitrov, the latter in whom also produced, and the words were written by Subotić and Violeta Mihajlovska Milić. During an interview with the online newspaper Wiwibloggs, Žižić described the song as "how a woman can be strong at times of challenge". The title coined by Subotić was unexpected for Žižić herself, as she did not expect a ballad, but rather a dance song with less serious lyrics. According to Žižić, she was encouraged to participate in Montesong by Mihajlovska Milić. After a brief hesitation, she decided to take part in it.

== Critical reception ==
Professional ratings
Review scores
Source	Rating
Wiwibloggs	5.17/10
Yle	5/10

In a Wiwibloggs review containing several reviews from several critics, the song was rated 5.17 out of 10 points, earning 30th out of the 37 songs competing in that year's Eurovision in the site's annual ranking that year. Jon O'Brien from Vulture ranked the song 22nd out of 37, calling the song a "showstopper". Doron Lahav ranked the song 7th out of 37, stating that it the song is of high-quality, although it does not speak to everyone. Eva Frantz from the Finnish broadcaster Yle gave the song a 5/10, describing the song as "dramatic and elegant".

== Eurovision Song Contest ==
=== Montesong 2024 ===
On 10 October 2024, Radio and Television of Montenegro (RTCG) announced that it had selected "Dobrodošli" performed by Nina Žižić as one of the songs to compete in Montesong 2024, the national final that it organised to select its entry for the Eurovision Song Contest 2025. On 27 November 2024, the song finished first place among the judges and fourth place among the audience in the competition, placing it in second place overall, one point behind the winning song "Clickbait", performed by the rock band Neonoen. On 4 December 2024, however, Neonoen withdrew from Eurovision after it was revealed that they had previously performed their entry in June 2023, which violated of the rules of the contest. On 8 December, RTCG announced that the song finished in second place in Montesong 2024, "Dobrodošli" performed by Žižić, would represent Montenegro at Eurovision.

=== At Eurovision ===
The Eurovision Song Contest 2025 took place at St. Jakobshalle in Basel, Switzerland, and consisted of two semi-finals held on the respective dates of 13 and 15 May and the final on 17 May 2025. During the allocation draw held on 28 January 2025, Montenegro was drawn to compete in the second semi-final, performing in the first half of the show. Žižić was later drawn to perform in second in the semi-final, after Australia's Go-Jo and before Ireland's Emmy. The song finished in 16th and last place in the second semi-final with the fewest points, thus failing to qualify.

== Track listing ==
Digital download/streaming

1. "Dobrodošli" – 3:00

Digital download/streaming – live version

1. "Dobrodošli" (Live) – 3:42

== Release history ==
Release dates and formats for "Dobrodošli"
Region	Date	Format	Version	Label	Ref.
Various	10 November 2024	Digital download; streaming	Original	RTCG	
Various	27 November 2024	Digital download; streaming	Live	RTCG	
Various	10 March 2025	Digital download; streaming	Eurovision	Dimitrov	

== Awards and nominations ==
Year	Award	Category	Nominee(s)	Result	Ref.
2025	Montefon Awards	Hit of the year	"Dobrodošli"	Won	
