= Montefon Awards =

Montenegrin music awards

Montefon
- Country: Montenegro
- Presented by: Association of Variety Artists and Performers of Montenegro (EUI)
- First award: 2001

The Montefon Awards are annual music awards in Montenegro recognizing achievements by local artists in contemporary popular and folk music. Established in 2001, the awards are regarded as one of the country’s principal national music awards.

== Background ==
Montefon was created to promote the Montenegrin music scene during a period of increased artistic activity. The awards recognize achievements in popular and folk music and aim to provide visibility to both established and emerging performers. The ceremony was officially presented as Godišnje nagrade – Oskar popularnosti (transl. Annual Awards – Oscars of Popularity).

== History ==
The awards were founded by Montenegrin singer and cultural organizer Bojan Bajramović, then president of the Udruženje estradnih umjetnika i izvođača Crne Gore (EUI; transl. Association of Variety Artists and Performers of Montenegro).

The inaugural ceremony took place on 17 December 2001 at the Morača Sports Center in Podgorica. It featured awards in competitive categories, along with special honors for artistic contribution and a Discovery of the Year award for emerging artists. The ceremony was hosted by Ivan Maksimović and Dušica Vugdelić and included performances by nominees and special guest appearances by Tijana Dapčević and Ksenija Pajčin. It was organized by the EUI in cooperation with Sound Records and formed part of Podgorica's December Days of Culture. It received institutional support from the Government of Montenegro and the Secretariat for Culture, with reported organizational costs of approximately 27,000 German marks.

The second edition, Montefon 2002, was held on 16 and 17 December at the KIC Budo Tomović, continuing the awards' focus on popular and folk music.

The awards were held annually through Montefon 2007 in February 2008 and were subsequently discontinued after founder Bojan Bajramović withdrew from preparations for health reasons and died later that year, with no successor assuming responsibility.

== Revival ==
The revival of the Montefon Awards was initiated by Danijel Alibabić, president of EUI, in cooperation with the Montenegrin public broadcaster RTCG. The awards returned in 2024 as part of the Montesong, Montenegro’s national selection for the Eurovision Song Contest. In 2025, Montefon was again presented during the Montesong 2025.

== Recipients ==
=== 2001 ===
Montefon 2001, the inaugural ceremony took place on 17 December 2001 at the Morača Sports Center in Podgorica. It featured awards in competitive categories and with special honors:

- Female Pop Singer of the Year: Biljana Mitrović
- Male Pop Singer of the Year: Sergej Ćetković
- Folk Singer of the Year: Šako Polumenta
- Group of the Year: Perper
- Duo of the Year: Kaja and Duka
- Lyricist of the Year: Ljubo Jovović
- Arranger of the Year: Dejan Božović
- Pop Album of the Year: Navika by Vlado Georgijev
- Folk Album of the Year: Goran Vukošić by Goran Vukošić
- Discovery of the Year: Pero Trokadero
- Personality of the Year: Vlado Georgijev
- Special Award: Žuti Serhatlić Ensemble
- Special Award for 30 Years of Artistic Work: Zoran Kalezić
- Special Award for Contribution to Music: Branka Šćepanović
- Special Award for Contribution to Montenegrin Folk Music: Zdravko Đuranović

=== 2002 ===
Montefon 2002, the second ceremony took place on December 16 and 17, 2002, at the KIC Budo Tomović in Podgorica.

- Female Pop Singer of the Year: Suzana Tot
- Songwriter of the Year: Momčilo Zeković (Zeko)
- Lifetime Achievement Award: Svetozar Purko Aleksić
- Award for Advancement of Film and Instrumental Music in Montenegro: Miodrag Bole Bošković

=== 2003 ===
Montefon 2003, the third ceremony.

- Discovery of the Year: Stevan Faddy

=== 2004 ===
Montefon 2004, the fourth ceremony.

- Video of the Year: "Sa dušom od kamena" by Perper, directed by Mirko Matović

=== 2005 ===
Montefon 2005, the fifth ceremony.

- Discovery of the Year: No Name
- Instrumental Album of the Year: Letters from Montenegro by Vladimir Maraš

=== 2006 ===
Montefon 2006, the sixth ceremony.

=== 2007 ===
Montefon 2007, the seventh ceremony, was held in February 2008 at the KIC Budo Tomović in Podgorica, recognizing achievements by artists during the 2007 music year. Recipients in 11 competitive categories were selected by public voting, with three additional special awards presented by the EUI:

- Female Pop Singer of the Year: Milena Vučić
- Male Pop Singer of the Year: Stefan Filipović
- Folk Singer of the Year: Jadranka Barjaktarović
- Group of the Year: No Name
- Composer of the Year: Danijel Alibabić
- Lyricist of the Year: Danijel Alibabić
- Arranger of the Year: Vladan Popović-Pop
- Album of the Year: Litar neba by Bojan Marović
- Hit of the Year: "Otvoreno" by Bojan Delić
- Video of the Year: "Luče" by Milena Vučić
- Discovery of the Year: Anja Mašanović
- Special Award "Rođa Raičević" for Singer of the Year, aged 12–17: Luka Đurđević
- Special Award for Most Complete Musical Personality: Sergej Ćetković
- Special Award for First Eurovision Representative of Independent Montenegro: Stevan Faddy

=== 2024 ===
The inaugural awards following the revival were presented during Montesong on November 27, 2024:

- Female Singer of the Year: Ivana Popović Martinović
- Male Singer of the Year: Sergej Ćetković
- Group of the Year: Neonoen
- Video of the Year: "Violinegro" by Verica Čuljković
- Special Award "Snežana Ćosović" for Interpretation (at Montesong 2024): Tina Džankić for "Nova"

=== 2025 ===
The 2025 awards were presented during Montesong on December 21, 2025, and expanded the categories to recognize achievements throughout the year:

- Female Singer of the Year: Andrijana Božović
- Male Singer of the Year: Knez
- Group of the Year: Bubnjivi i psi
- Hit of the Year: "Dobrodošli" by Nina Žižić
- Discovery of the Year: Baryak
- Special Award "Snežana Ćosović" for Interpretation (at Montesong 2025): Majda Božović for "Ipak smo ljudi"
- Contribution to Montenegrin Musical Culture: Edo Abdović

== See also ==
- Music of Montenegro
- List of music awards
