= Montenegro in the Eurovision Song Contest 2025 =

- Eurovision Song Contest 2025
- Participating broadcaster: Radio and Television of Montenegro (RTCG)
- Country: Montenegro
- Selection process: Selection among Montesong 2024 entries
- Announcement date: 8 December 2024

Competing entry
- Song: "Dobrodošli"
- Artist: Nina Žižić
- Songwriters: Boris Subotić; Darko Dimitrov; Violeta Mihajlovska Milić

Placement
- Semi-final result: Failed to qualify (16th)

Participation chronology

Montenegro was represented at the Eurovision Song Contest 2025 with the song "Dobrodošli", written by Boris Subotić, Darko Dimitrov, and Violeta Mihajlovska Milić, and performed by Nina Žižić. The Montenegrin participating broadcaster, Radio and Television of Montenegro (RTCG), organised the national final Montesong 2024 to select its entry for the contest. The song "Clickbait" performed by Neonoen won the national final, however, the band withdrew due to a controversy over having previously performed their song in June 2023, with runner-up Žižić later announced as their replacement.

Montenegro was drawn to compete in the second semi-final of the Eurovision Song Contest, which took place on 15 May 2025. Performing during the show in position 2, "Dobrodošli" was not announced among the top 10 entries of the second semi-final and therefore did not qualify to compete in the final. It was later revealed that Montenegro placed last out of the 16 participating countries in the semi-final with 12 points, marking the first time Montenegro finished last in a Eurovision event.

== Background ==
Prior to the 2025 contest, Radio and Television of Montenegro (RTCG) has participated in the Eurovision Song Contest representing Montenegro as an independent country twelve times since its first entry in 2007. Its best placing in the contest was thirteenth position, which it achieved in 2015 with the song "Adio" performed by Knez. In 2014, Montenegro qualified to the final for the first time since it began participating, and have since featured in the final of the Eurovision Song Contest one more time in 2015. RTCG briefly withdrew from the competition between 2010 and 2011, as well as in 2021, 2023, and 2024, citing "modest results" and/or financial difficulties as the reason for its absences. In 2022, Montenegro failed to qualify for the final with the song "Breathe" performed by Vladana Vučinić.

As part of its duties as participating broadcaster, RTCG organises the selection of its entry in the Eurovision Song Contest and broadcasts the event in the country. On 6 January 2024, RTCG outlined its aim to introduce a popular music festival, which could serve as its selection process for the 2025 contest, dependent on funding. On 7 August 2024, RTCG published a document outlining the rules of Montesong 2024. An official confirmation of both participation in the 2025 contest and the organisation of a national final was announced by RTCG on 15 August 2024. RTCG had used various methods to select the Montenegrin entry in the past, such as internal selections and televised national finals to choose the performer, song or both to compete at Eurovision. The reintroduction of a national final for the 2025 contest marked the first time since 2019 that the broadcaster organised a national selection, with Montevizija held in 2018 and 2019.

== Before Eurovision ==
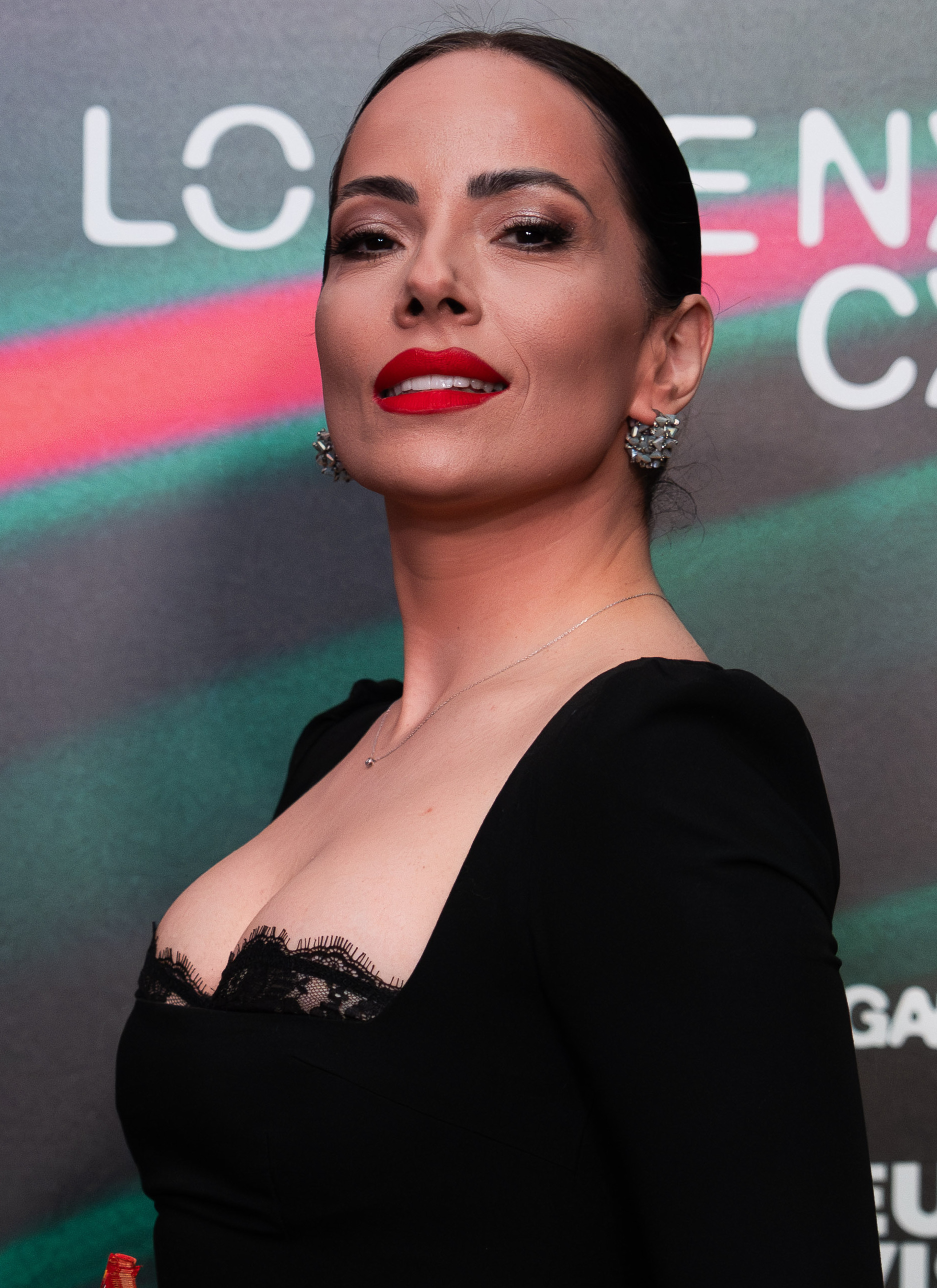
Nina Žižić, who was selected to represent Montenegro following Montesong 2024, at the PrePartyES event in Madrid

=== Montesong 2024 ===
Montesong 2024 was the national final format organised by RTCG to select its entry for the Eurovision Song Contest 2025. Organised in a collaboration between the broadcaster and the Association of Variety Performers of Montenegro, a live final was initially scheduled for 26 November 2024, with an awards ceremony to be held the following day. However, the event was later revised to a final on 27 November 2024. The competition took place at the Voco Hall in Podgorica, and was hosted by Marko Todorović and Vladana Vučinić, the latter of whom represented Montenegro in 2022, alongside Lazar Radulović and Andrea Šekularac reporting from the green room. The show was broadcast live on TVCG 1, MNE Play, and via the event's YouTube channel.

==== Format ====
The competition consisted of a live final held on 27 November 2024. Sixteen entries competed. The winner was selected through a 50/50 combination of votes from a 7-member jury and from a public televote, with the same system used to award points in the Eurovision Song Contest final: the jury and the public each awarded one set of 12, 10 and 8–1 points to their 10 favourite entries. In case of a tie following the addition of the jury and the televoting points together, the song that received more 12 points from individual members of the jury had an advantage. This process was to be repeated with other points, in descending order, until the tie could be broken. In the public televote, only one vote per phone number was permitted. The professional jury consisted of both local music professionals and music representatives from across Europe.

==== Competing entries ====
On 7 August 2024, RTCG opened a submission platform for interested artists and composers, which remained open until 1 October 2024. Performers are required to be citizens of Montenegro, while songwriters may be of any nationality. All submitted songs are required to be written in at least 51% of one of the official languages of Montenegro. From there, a committee set up by the broadcaster reviewed the submissions and selected sixteen songs for the competition. The panel consisted of Boris Šarančić (entertainment editor for TVCG), Dražen Bauković (journalist and editor of music shows), Eva Papović (music editor at TVCG), Ana Petrović (music editor at RCG), Renata Perazić (musician and author), Marija Božović (musician and author), and Natalija Pavićević (songwriter). Each juror judged each song using a points system, giving a maximum of 50 points for composition, 30 points for lyrics and 20 points for production, meaning each song could earn a maximum of 100 points. However, songs had to achieve at least 75 points from this process in order to reach the competition stage. RTCG also stipulated that it had the right to internally select its entry for the contest if no submitted entry reached the threshold. At a press conference on 5 September 2024, Montesong director Danijel Alibabić, who represented Serbia and Montenegro in 2005 as part of No Name, confirmed that up to sixteen entries would be performed in the national final. On 2 October 2024, RTCG revealed that it had received 32 submissions, and that they would allow any further late applications due to postal delays. In total, 37 submissions were received, with 4 of those being disqualified. The competing entries (plus three backups) were announced on 10 October 2024 during the RTCG show Jutarnji program, which was broadcast on TVCG 1. On 4 November 2024, Boban Rajović withdrew from the competition due to personal commitments, and RTCG confirmed that reserve artist, Tamara Živković, would replace his entry for the contest.

Among the competing artists was Nina Žižić, who provided uncredited vocals for Who See at the Eurovision Song Contest 2013. Also among the competing acts were Kejt, who competed in Montevizija 2018, Marko Vukčević, lead singer of Neonoen, who competed in Evropesma-Europjesma 2004 as member of the group Evropa and in Montevizija and Evropesma-Europjesma 2005 as a solo artist, Milena Vučić, who competed in Evropesma-Europjesma 2004 as member of the group Negre and in Montevizija and Evropesma-Europjesma 2006 as a solo artist. Among the backup entries was Danijel Popović, who won Jugovizija 1983, Yugoslavia's national final for Eurovision, and subsequently represented the country in the 1983 contest with the song "Džuli"; he competed in Yugoslavia's national selection a further four times: in 1984, 1986, 1987, and 1991. He previously applied his entry "Kano kastigan" to Dora 2023, Croatia's national selection for the 2023 contest. The competing songs were released on 10 November 2024.

Entry withdrawn Replacement entry

Montesong 2024 contestants
Artist	Song	Songwriter(s)
Anastasija Koprolčec	"Kraj" (Крај)	Bojan Marović; Stevan Milanović
Baryak	"Dva srca" (Два срца)	Luka Perazić; Rade Vukčević
Bend 9	"Stop War"	Milić Šarović
~~Boban Rajović~~	~~"Suze" (Сузе)~~	Branislav Glušac; Goran Ratković; Miladin Bogosavljević
Dolce Hera	"Repeat"	Aleksandra Prelević Palladino; Marko Čaćić; Todor Tadić
Đurđa	"To ljubav je" (То љубав је)	Đurđa Petrović Poljak; Jonas Jensen; Kristina Kovač; Olivér Patocska
Glumci Bend	"San" (Сан)	Dragana Tripković; Mladen Nikčević
Isak Šabanović	"Ljeto, ljeto, ljeto" (Љето, љето, љето)	Leontina Vukomanović; Nemanja Filipović
Kejt	"Obala raja" (Обала раја)	Hugo Smeh; James Gillespie; Katarina Bogićević
Luka Radović	"Kada dođe maj" (Када дође мај)	Luka Radović
Milena Vučić	"Škorpija" (Шкорпија)	Alen Stajić; Marko Peruničić; Nebojša Arežina; Sanja Vučić
Nemanja Petrović	"Među zvijezdama" (Међу звијездама)	Branislav Opačić
Neonoen	"Clickbait"	Ilija Pejović
Nina Žižić	"Dobrodošli" (Добродошли)	Boris Subotić; Darko Dimitrov; Violeta Mihajlovska Milić
Tamara Živković	"Poguban let" (Погубан лет)	Boris Subotić
Tina Džankić	"Nova" (Нова)	Anja Zagorac; Vladimir Maraš
Verica Čuljković	"Čuješ li" (Чујеш ли)	Filip Tančić; Verica Čuljković

Reserve entries
Artist	Song	Language	Songwriter(s)
~~Tamara Živković~~	~~"Poguban let" (Погубан лет)~~	~~Montenegrin~~	~~Boris Subotić~~
Hanibal	"Čuvaj me" (Чувај ме)	Montenegrin	Igor Perović; Slaven Ivanović
Danijel Popović	"Kano kastigan" (Кано кастиган)	Unknown	Unknown

==== Final ====
The final took place on 27 November 2024 at 20:00 CET. The running order was revealed on 19 November. The song "Clickbait" performed by the group Neonoen won the contest. It finished second in the jury vote, and second in the televote. The jury consisted of: Hari Varešanović, who represented Bosnia and Herzegovina in 2006 as part of Hari Mata Hari; Nuša Derenda, who represented Slovenia in 2001; Dado Topić, who represented Croatia in 2007 with the group Dragonfly; Elena Risteska, who represented Macedonia in 2006; Tijana Bogićević, who represented Serbia in 2017; Emmelie de Forest, who represented Denmark in 2013 and won the 2013 contest; and Danijel Popović, who represented Yugoslavia in 1983.

In addition to the competing artists, guests included Sergej Ćetković, who represented Montenegro in 2014, and event director Danijel Alibabić, who represented Serbia and Montenegro in 2005 as part of No Name. Guest performances featured at the opening of the show included Danijel Popović, who performed his 1983 Eurovision song "Džuli", and co-host Vladana Vučinić, who performed "Respira", an Italian language version of her 2022 Eurovision entry "Breathe". During the interval between the last competing song and the announcement of the votes, additional guest performances included Sergej Ćetković, performing his 2014 Eurovision song "Moj svijet", Elena Risteska, who performed "Muka mi je", and Emmelie de Forest, who performed her 2013 Eurovision winning song "Only Teardrops".

A total of 3,262 votes were successfully cast according to RTCG, however the figure announced during the show was 2,233. The broadcaster explained that the discrepancy was due to a delay in communicating the updated number of received votes. Bogićević accidentally awarded her 8 points to "Repeat" instead of "Dva srca", which she disclosed while announcing her points.

Final – 27 November 2024
R/O	Artist	Song	Jury		Televote		Total	Place
R/O	Artist	Song	Votes	Points	Votes	Points	Total	Place
1	Anastasija Koprolčec	"Kraj"	9	0	57	0	0	15
2	Tina Džankić	"Nova"	34	5	154	3	8	7
3	Nemanja Petrović	"Među zvijezdama"	18	1	109	0	1	12
4	Bend 9	"Stop War"	2	0	143	0	0	16
5	Tamara Živković	"Poguban let"	39	6	107	0	6	9
6	Luka Radović	"Kada dođe maj"	5	0	147	1	1	13
7	Đurđa	"To ljubav je"	26	4	328	8	12	4
8	Kejt	"Obala raja"	45	7	152	2	9	5
9	Nina Žižić	"Dobrodošli"	59	12	316	7	19	2
10	Neonoen	"Clickbait"	54	10	443	10	20	1
11	Isak Šabanović	"Ljeto, ljeto, ljeto"	24	2	241	5	7	8
12	Glumci Bend	"San"	4	0	288	6	6	10
13	Dolce Hera	"Repeat"	8	0	84	0	0	14
14	Baryak	"Dva srca"	25	3	476	12	15	3
15	Verica Čuljković	"Čuješ li"	6	0	168	4	4	11
16	Milena Vučić	"Škorpija"	48	8	49	0	8	6

Detailed jury results
R/O	Song	H. Varešanović	N. Derenda	D. Topić	E. Risteska	T. Bogićević	E. de Forest	D. Popović	Total
1	"Kraj"	3			2	1	3		9
2	"Nova"	4	10	3	4	4	4	5	34
3	"Među zvijezdama"	12	1				1	4	18
4	"Stop War"			2					2
5	"Poguban let"	10	5	5	1	3	5	10	39
6	"Kada dođe maj"	5							5
7	"To ljubav je"	7	3	1	3	2	10		26
8	"Obala raja"		8	8	10	6	6	7	47
9	"Dobrodošli"	6	4	7	12	10	8	12	59
10	"Clickbait"		6	10	6	12	12	8	54
11	"Ljeto, ljeto, ljeto"	1	7		5	5		6	24
12	"San"			4					4
13	"Repeat"					8 (Note: Tijana Bogićević accidentally awarded her 8 points to "Repeat" instead of "Dva srca")			8
14	"Dva srca"		2	12	8			3	25
15	"Čuješ li"	2					2	2	6
16	"Škorpija"	8	12	6	7	7	7	1	48

=== Controversy and entry replacement ===
On 1 December 2024, RTCG revealed that "Clickbait" was previously performed during Festival kulture Zabjelo in Zabjelo, Podgorica in June 2023, which breaches the contest's rules obliging that competing songs may not have been released commercially or publicly performed before 1 September 2024, and that it would discuss with the EBU the following day to decide whether the entry is eligible for the contest. In response, Neonoen stated they believed the number of attendees who saw the performance was not substantial enough to influence the result of Montesong 2024, as well as that they were not aware of the rule regarding the ban on performing the entry fully or in part prior to 1 September 2024, but that they would respect any decision made by RTCG and the EBU. On 4 December, Neonoen voluntarily withdrew from participating in the contest, citing a "desire to end the uncertainty". On 8 December, RTCG announced that the second place of Montesong 2024, "Dobrodošli" performed by Nina Žižić, would represent Montenegro at the contest.

Vučinić announced her intention to resign from RTCG the day after the national final on 5 December, citing a lack of transparency in the organisation of the national final. Despite this, she was later appointed head of the Montenegrin delegation for Eurovision.

The Montesong itself was widely criticized for its bad organization, with Vučinić being ridiculed for her frequent slips of the tongue, mispronounced words, and disjointed sentences.

=== Preparation ===
On 26 January 2025, RTCG confirmed that "Dobrodošli" will undergo a minor revamp prior to the contest. Žižić affirmed that the delegation would carry out a revamp, but that nothing would "significantly change the song itself". The revamped version was released on 9 March, during a special edition of the RTCG show Pod Naponom.

== At Eurovision ==
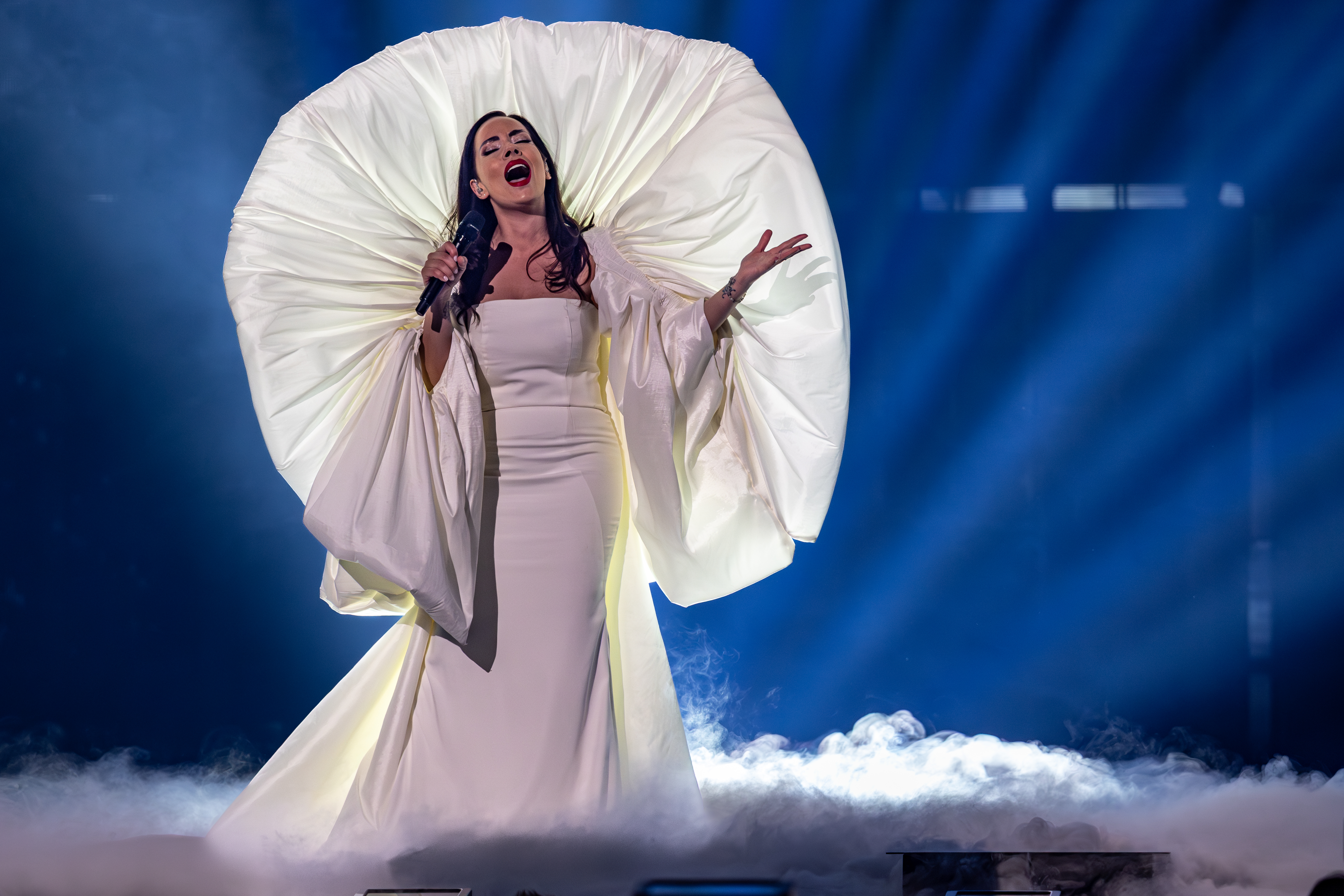
Nina Žižić during the second semi-final on 15 May 2025.

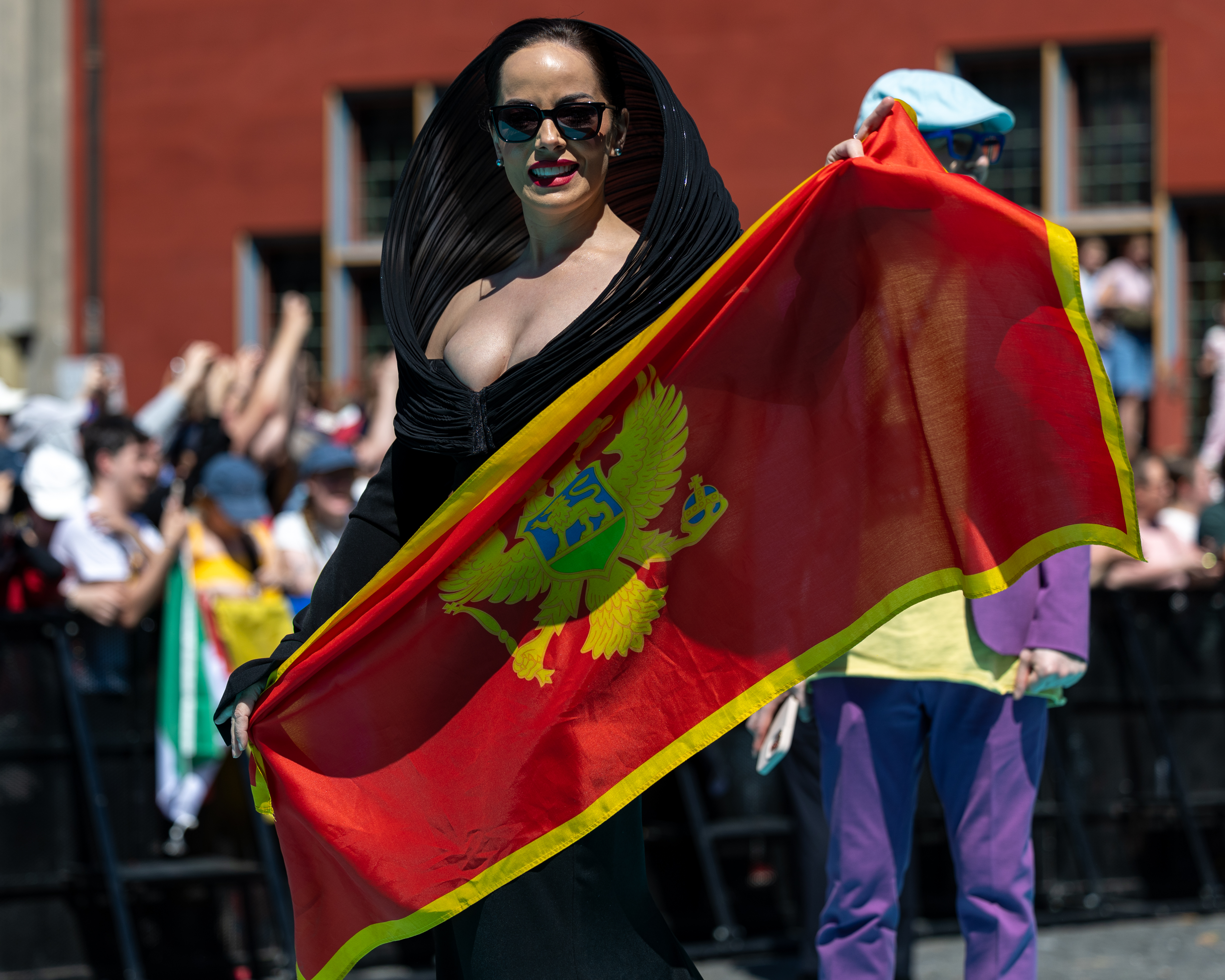
Nina Žižić and the Montenegrin delegation during the opening ceremony.

The Eurovision Song Contest 2025 took place at the St. Jakobshalle in Basel, Switzerland, and consisted of two semi-finals held on the respective dates of 13 and 15 May and the final on 17 May 2025. All nations with the exceptions of the host country and the "Big Five" (France, Germany, Italy, Spain and the United Kingdom) were required to qualify from one of two semi-finals in order to compete in the final; the top ten countries from each semi-final progressed to the final. On 28 January 2025, an allocation draw was held to determine which of the two semi-finals, as well as which half of the show, each country would perform in; the EBU split up the competing countries into different pots based on voting patterns from previous contests, with countries with favourable voting histories put into the same pot. Montenegro was scheduled for the first half of the second semi-final. The shows' producers then decided the running order for the semi-finals; Montenegro was set to perform in position 2.

In Montenegro, RTCG broadcast all shows on TVCG 1 and TVCG MNE with live commentary from Dražen Bauković in Podgorica.

=== Performance ===
Nina Žižić took part in technical rehearsals on 5 and 9 May, followed by dress rehearsals on 14 and 15 May. The stage performance retained elements of the national final performance, with the delegation focusing on enhancing the aesthetic quality to suit the larger stage. The performance saw Žižić perform alone in an outfit designed by Serbian fashion designer Amina Hasanbegović. The stage performance was designed by Dalibor Ivanković, Boris Subotić and Aleksandar Maričić - the same trio which directed Žižić's national final performance. As in Montesong, during the introduction of the performance, Žižić wore a blindfold to symbolise Lady Justice. To add to this, a depiction of a sword with scales was displayed on the back LED screen before the bridge of the song.

=== Semi-final ===
Montenegro performed in position 2, following the entry from Australia and before the entry from Ireland. At the end of the show, the country was not announced as a qualifier for the final, extending Montenegro's run as the country with the longest non-qualification streak. It was later revealed that Montenegro placed last out of the sixteen participating countries in the second semi-final with 12 points, marking the first time the country had finished last in a Eurovision event.

=== Voting ===
Below is a breakdown of points awarded by and to Montenegro in the second semi-final and in the final. Voting during the three shows involved each country awarding sets of points from 1-8, 10 and 12: one from their professional jury and the other from televoting in the final vote, while the semi-final vote was based entirely on the vote of the public. The Montenegrin jury consisted of Gavrilo Radunović, Željko Vukčević, Bojana Nenezić, Jelena Božović and Marija Božović. In the second semi-final, Montenegro placed 16th with 12 points, all of which came from Serbia. Over the course of the contest, Montenegro awarded its 12 points to Serbia in the second semi-final, and to Greece (jury) and Albania (televote) in the final.

RTCG appointed Marko Vukčević as its spokesperson to announce the Montenegrin jury's votes in the final.

==== Points awarded to Montenegro ====
Points awarded to Montenegro (Semi-final 2)
Points	Televote
12 points	Serbia
10 points	
8 points	
7 points	
6 points	
5 points	
4 points	
3 points	
2 points	
1 point	

==== Points awarded by Montenegro ====
Points awarded by Montenegro (Semi-final 2)
Points	Televote
12 points	Serbia
10 points	Greece
8 points	Israel
7 points	Austria
6 points	Finland
5 points	Lithuania
4 points	Malta
3 points	Latvia
2 points	Denmark
1 point	Luxembourg

Points awarded by Montenegro (Final)
Points	Televote	Jury
12 points	Albania	Greece
10 points	Estonia	Albania
8 points	Luxembourg	Austria
7 points	Israel	Switzerland
6 points	Ukraine	France
5 points	Sweden	Malta
4 points	Greece	Luxembourg
3 points	Austria	Lithuania
2 points	France	Netherlands
1 point	Italy	Armenia

==== Detailed voting results ====
Each participating broadcaster assembles a five-member jury panel consisting of music industry professionals who are citizens of the country they represent. Each jury, and individual jury member, is required to meet a strict set of criteria regarding professional background, as well as diversity in gender and age. No member of a national jury was permitted to be related in any way to any of the competing acts in such a way that they cannot vote impartially and independently. The individual rankings of each jury member as well as the nation's televoting results were released shortly after the grand final.

The following members comprised the Montenegrin jury:

- Gavrilo Radunović
- Željko Vukčević (represented Montenegro in the Eurovision Song Contest 2019 as part of D mol)
- Bojana Nenezić
- Jelena Božović
- Marija Božović

Detailed voting results from Montenegro (Semi-final 2)
R/O	Country	Televote	
R/O	Country	Rank	Points
01	Australia	13	
02	Montenegro		
03	Ireland	12	
04	Latvia	8	3
05	Armenia	11	
06	Austria	4	7
07	Greece	2	10
08	Lithuania	6	5
09	Malta	7	4
10	Georgia	15	
11	Denmark	9	2
12	Czechia	14	
13	Luxembourg	10	1
14	Israel	3	8
15	Serbia	1	12
16	Finland	5	6

Detailed voting results by Montenegro (final)
R/O	Country	Jury							Televote	
R/O	Country	Juror A	Juror B	Juror C	Juror D	Juror E	Rank	Points	Rank	Points
01	Norway	21	20	14	20	19	21		14	
02	Luxembourg	3	9	12	14	5	7	4	3	8
03	Estonia	12	3	10	17	14	12		2	10
04	Israel	19	26	26	6	3	13		4	7
05	Lithuania	4	5	11	10	24	8	3	16	
06	Spain	18	15	21	21	21	23		23	
07	Ukraine	25	19	25	11	25	20		5	6
08	United Kingdom	11	13	17	15	23	16		26	
09	Austria	2	11	5	4	2	3	8	8	3
10	Iceland	26	25	23	24	22	26		22	
11	Latvia	9	8	6	16	9	11		13	
12	Netherlands	8	7	9	7	13	9	2	20	
13	Finland	15	24	13	26	18	19		11	
14	Italy	24	17	18	18	20	24		10	1
15	Poland	23	16	20	12	17	18		17	
16	Germany	22	23	16	23	10	17		12	
17	Greece	1	2	2	1	1	1	12	7	4
18	Armenia	6	12	7	8	12	10	1	15	
19	Switzerland	13	4	1	5	15	4	7	25	
20	Malta	7	6	4	9	7	6	5	19	
21	Portugal	20	22	24	25	26	25		21	
22	Denmark	17	14	15	13	8	14		24	
23	Sweden	16	21	19	22	16	22		6	5
24	France	10	18	8	2	4	5	6	9	2
25	San Marino	14	10	22	19	11	15		18	
26	Albania	5	1	3	3	6	2	10	1	12
