= Montenegro in the Eurovision Song Contest 2018 =

- Eurovision Song Contest 2018
- Participating broadcaster: Radio and Television of Montenegro (RTCG)
- Country: Montenegro
- Selection process: Montevizija 2018
- Selection date: 17 February 2018

Competing entry
- Song: "Inje"
- Artist: Vanja Radovanović
- Songwriters: Vanja Radovanović

Placement
- Semi-final result: Failed to qualify (16th)

Participation chronology

Montenegro was represented at the Eurovision Song Contest 2018 with the song "Inje" written and performed by Vanja Radovanović. The Montenegrin broadcaster Radio i televizija Crne Gore (RTCG) organised the national final Montevizija 2018 in order to select the Montenegrin entry for the 2018 contest in Lisbon, Portugal.

Five entries competed in the national final on 17 February 2018 where the winner was selected over two rounds of public televoting. In the first round, the top three entries advanced to the superfinal. In the superfinal, "Inje" performed by Vanja Radovanović was the winner after gaining 37% of the votes.

Montenegro was drawn to compete in the second semi-final of the Eurovision Song Contest which took place on 10 May 2018. Performing during the show in position 16, "Inje" was not announced among the top 10 entries of the second semi-final and therefore did not qualify to compete in the final. It was later revealed that Montenegro placed sixteenth out of the 18 participating countries in the semi-final with 40 points.

== Background ==
Prior to the 2018 contest, Montenegro had participated in the Eurovision Song Contest as an independent nation nine times since its first entry in its own right in 2007. To this point, Montenegro has only featured in the final of the Eurovision Song Contest two times up to this point. The nation's best placing in the contest was thirteenth, which they achieved in 2015 with the song "Adio" performed by Knez. In 2017, Montenegro failed to qualify with the song "Space" performed by Slavko Kalezić. The nation briefly withdrew from the competition between 2010 and 2011 citing financial difficulties as the reason for their absence.

The Montenegrin national broadcaster, Radio i televizija Crne Gore (RTCG), broadcasts the event within Montenegro and organises the selection process for the nation's entry. RTCG confirmed that Montenegro would participate at the Eurovision Song Contest 2018 on 24 September 2017. Montenegro has used various methods to select the Montenegrin entry in the past, such as internal selections and televised national finals to choose the performer, song or both to compete at Eurovision. For 2018, the broadcaster returned to using a national final format to select the Montenegrin entry; RTCG opted to internally select both the artist and song that would represent Montenegro between 2009 and 2017.

== Before Eurovision ==
=== Montevizija 2018 ===
Montevizija 2018 was the national final organised by RTCG in order to select the Montenegrin entry for the Eurovision Song Contest 2018. Five entries competed in a televised final on 17 February 2018, which was held at the Hilton Hotel in Podgorica and hosted by Dajana Golubović Pejović and Ivan Maksimović. The show was televised on TVCG 1 and TVCG SAT as well as broadcast online via the broadcaster's website rtcg.me.

==== Competing entries ====
On 1 November 2017, RTCG opened a submission period where artists and songwriters were able to submit their entries until 15 December 2017. Songwriters of any nationality were allowed to submit entries, but songs were required to be written in the Montenegrin language, artists were required to be citizens of Montenegro and each songwriter was able to submit a maximum of two entries. RTCG received 31 entries at the closing of the deadline. A selection jury that consisted of singer Ismeta Dervoz, composers Kornelije Kovač and Slaven Knezović, composer and producer Dejan Božović and Radio Montenegro music editor Vladimir Maraš evaluated and marked the received submissions against a number of criteria: up to 50 points for composition, up to 30 points for lyrics and up to 20 points for the production potential of the composition. The top five entries were selected for the national final and announced on 16 January 2018.

==== Final ====
The final took place on 17 February 2018. The five competing entries were performed and the winner was selected over two rounds of public televoting. In the first round, the top three entries proceeded to the second round, the superfinal. In the superfinal, "Inje" performed by Vanja Radovanović was selected as the winner. A total of 10,006 votes were received by the televote over both rounds. In addition to the performances of the competing entries, the show also featured a guest appearance by 2018 Albanian Eurovision entrant Eugent Bushpepa and guest performances by 2015 Montenegrin Eurovision entrant Knez and 2017 Montenegrin Eurovision entrant Slavko Kalezić.

Final – 17 February 2018
R/O	Artist	Song	Songwriter(s)	Televote	Place
1	Nina Petković	"Dišem" (Дишем)	Nina Petković, Michael James Down, Jonas Gladnikoff, Matthew Ker	11%	5
2	Vanja Radovanović	"Inje" (Иње)	Vanja Radovanović	18%	3
3	Ivana Popović Martinović	"Poljupci" (Пољупци)	Slavko Milovanović, Ljubiša Martinović	12%	4
4	Katarina Bogićević	"Neželjena" (Нежељена)	Aleksandra Milutinović, Darko Dimitrov	19%	2
5	Lorena Janković	"Dušu mi daj" (Душу ми дај)	Mirsad Serhatlić, Milan Perić	40%	1

Superfinal – 17 February 2018
R/O	Artist	Song	Televote	Place
1	Vanja Radovanović	"Inje"	37%	1
2	Katarina Bogićević	"Neželjena"	34%	2
3	Lorena Janković	"Dušu mi daj"	29%	3

=== Preparation ===
Vanja Radovanović recorded the music video for "Inje" in March 2018, which was filmed in Kotor, Stari Bar, Valdanos and Cetinje and directed by Gojko Berkuljan. The official music video was released on 11 March via the official Eurovision Song Contest's YouTube channel.

=== Promotion ===
Vanja Radovanović made several appearances across Europe to specifically promote "Inje" as the Montenegrin Eurovision entry. Between 8 and 11 April, Vanja Radovanović took part in promotional activities in Tel Aviv, Israel and performed during the Israel Calling event held at the Rabin Square. On 14 April, Radovanović performed during the Eurovision in Concert event which was held at the AFAS Live venue in Amsterdam, Netherlands and hosted by Edsilia Rombley and Cornald Maas. On 17 April, Radovanović performed during the London Eurovision Party, which was held at the Café de Paris venue in London, United Kingdom and hosted by Nicki French and Paddy O'Connell. On 21 April, Radovanović performed during the ESPreParty event on 21 April which was held at the Sala La Riviera venue in Madrid, Spain and hosted by Soraya Arnelas.

== At Eurovision ==
According to Eurovision rules, all nations with the exceptions of the host country and the "Big Five" (France, Germany, Italy, Spain and the United Kingdom) are required to qualify from one of two semi-finals in order to compete for the final; the top ten countries from each semi-final progress to the final. The European Broadcasting Union (EBU) split up the competing countries into six different pots based on voting patterns from previous contests, with countries with favourable voting histories put into the same pot. On 29 January 2018, a special allocation draw was held which placed each country into one of the two semi-finals, as well as which half of the show they would perform in. Montenegro was placed into the second semi-final, to be held on 10 May 2018, and was scheduled to perform in the second half of the show.

Once all the competing songs for the 2018 contest had been released, the running order for the semi-finals was decided by the shows' producers rather than through another draw, so that similar songs were not placed next to each other. Montenegro was set to perform in position 16, following the entry from Sweden and before the entry from Slovenia.

The two semi-finals and the final were broadcast in Montenegro on TVCG 1 and TVCG SAT with commentary by Dražen Bauković and Tijana Mišković. The Montenegrin spokesperson, who announced the top 12-point score awarded by the Montenegrin jury during the final, was Nataša Šotra.

=== Semi-final ===
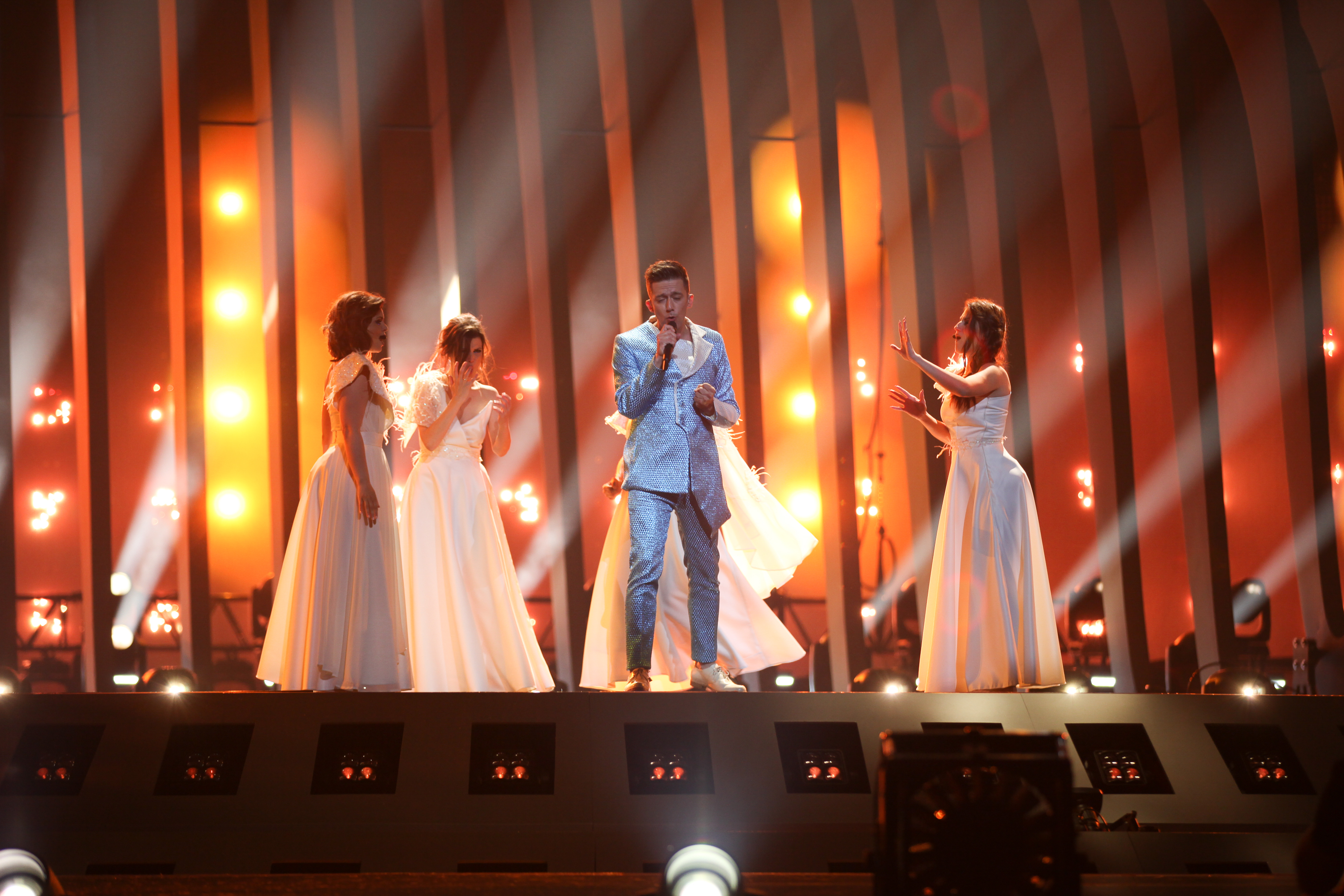
Vanja Radovanović during a rehearsal before the second semi-final

Vanja Radovanović took part in technical rehearsals on 2 and 5 May, followed by dress rehearsals on 9 and 10 May. This included the jury show on 9 May where the professional juries of each country watched and voted on the competing entries.

The Montenegrin performance featured Vanja Radovanović on stage a sky blue suit with a male pianist and five female backing vocalists standing in a line behind the stage before stepping forward to the front to join the singer. The stage lighting displayed from dark blue and white colours before changing into yellow and red for the climax. The stage director for the performance was Gojko Berkuljan who also directed the music video of "Inje". Vanja Radovanović's outfit was created by designer Milena Đurđić. The five backing vocalists performing with Vanja Radovanović were Ana Mašulović, Ivana Vladović, Jelena Đurić and Lena Kuzmanović and the pianist was Bole Martinović.

At the end of the show, Montenegro was not announced among the top 10 entries in the first semi-final and therefore failed to qualify to compete in the final. It was later revealed that Montenegro placed sixteenth in the semi-final, receiving a total of 40 points: 17 points from the televoting and 23 points from the juries.

=== Voting ===
Voting during the three shows involved each country awarding two sets of points from 1–8, 10 and 12: one from their professional jury and the other from televoting. Each nation's jury consisted of five music industry professionals who are citizens of the country they represent, with their names published before the contest to ensure transparency. This jury judged each entry based on: vocal capacity; the stage performance; the song's composition and originality; and the overall impression by the act. In addition, no member of a national jury was permitted to be related in any way to any of the competing acts in such a way that they cannot vote impartially and independently. The individual rankings of each jury member as well as the nation's televoting results were released shortly after the grand final.

Below is a breakdown of points awarded to Montenegro and awarded by Montenegro in the second semi-final and grand final of the contest, and the breakdown of the jury voting and televoting conducted during the two shows:

==== Points awarded to Montenegro ====
Points awarded to Montenegro (Semi-final 2)
Score	Televote	Jury
12 points		
10 points	Serbia	
8 points		
7 points	Slovenia	Romania; Serbia
6 points		
5 points		Malta
4 points		
3 points		Ukraine
2 points		
1 point		Slovenia

==== Points awarded by Montenegro ====
Points awarded by Montenegro (Semi-final 2)
Score	Televote	Jury
12 points	Serbia	Serbia
10 points	Slovenia	Ukraine
8 points	Russia	Romania
7 points	Ukraine	Malta
6 points	Sweden	Norway
5 points	Norway	Moldova
4 points	Moldova	Netherlands
3 points	Denmark	Australia
2 points	Netherlands	Sweden
1 point	Hungary	Denmark

Points awarded by Montenegro (Final)
Score	Televote	Jury
12 points	Serbia	Serbia
10 points	Albania	Albania
8 points	Italy	Moldova
7 points	Ukraine	Norway
6 points	Slovenia	Denmark
5 points	Cyprus	Estonia
4 points	Bulgaria	Italy
3 points	Hungary	Netherlands
2 points	Sweden	United Kingdom
1 point	Israel	Cyprus

==== Detailed voting results ====
The following members comprised the Montenegrin jury:

- Zoja Đurović (jury chairperson) – director of the Art School for Music and Ballet Vasa Pavić
- Kaća Šćekić – professor at the Art School for Music and Ballet Vasa Pavić
- Nina Žižić – singer, represented Montenegro in the 2013 contest (along with Who See) and later solo in 2025
- Predrag Nedeljković – composer
- Senad Drešević – composer

Detailed voting results from Montenegro (Semi-final 2)
R/O	Country	Jury							Televote	
R/O	Country	K. Šćekić	N. Žižić	P. Nedeljković	Z. Đurović	S. Drešević	Rank	Points	Rank	Points
01	Norway	6	4	4	10	8	5	6	6	5
02	Romania	2	7	8	14	1	3	8	12	
03	Serbia	1	1	5	3	12	1	12	1	12
04	San Marino	17	17	6	12	11	14		14	
05	Denmark	8	6	10	4	9	10	1	8	3
06	Russia	10	13	16	16	3	13		3	8
07	Moldova	12	8	15	1	5	6	5	7	4
08	Netherlands	7	2	7	6	17	7	4	9	2
09	Australia	11	12	12	2	4	8	3	13	
10	Georgia	9	16	14	11	13	16		11	
11	Poland	5	9	17	7	15	12		17	
12	Malta	3	15	2	8	7	4	7	16	
13	Hungary	15	11	13	15	10	17		10	1
14	Latvia	16	10	11	9	16	15		15	
15	Sweden	14	5	3	13	6	9	2	5	6
16	Montenegro									
17	Slovenia	13	3	9	5	14	11		2	10
18	Ukraine	4	14	1	17	2	2	10	4	7

Detailed voting results from Montenegro (Final)
R/O	Country	Jury							Televote	
R/O	Country	K. Šćekić	N. Žižić	P. Nedeljković	Z. Đurović	S. Drešević	Rank	Points	Rank	Points
01	Ukraine	17	18	13	22	12	21		4	7
02	Spain	15	21	7	15	23	19		21	
03	Slovenia	21	16	19	19	24	23		5	6
04	Lithuania	12	6	16	21	25	16		25	
05	Austria	10	13	18	20	22	20		12	
06	Estonia	6	5	6	10	11	6	5	16	
07	Norway	14	3	4	9	6	4	7	13	
08	Portugal	19	22	24	24	18	25		26	
09	United Kingdom	2	17	14	8	17	9	2	23	
10	Serbia	1	1	1	5	3	1	12	1	12
11	Germany	11	23	10	12	5	12		19	
12	Albania	3	2	3	4	2	2	10	2	10
13	France	9	25	20	7	26	17		18	
14	Czech Republic	24	14	25	23	13	22		15	
15	Denmark	7	12	11	1	16	5	6	11	
16	Australia	8	9	21	6	8	11		20	
17	Finland	22	7	12	13	10	14		24	
18	Bulgaria	20	4	15	14	21	13		7	4
19	Moldova	5	19	2	2	4	3	8	14	
20	Sweden	16	15	8	25	9	15		9	2
21	Hungary	25	26	26	26	20	26		8	3
22	Israel	26	10	9	18	15	18		10	1
23	Netherlands	13	8	5	11	7	8	3	17	
24	Ireland	23	20	22	17	19	24		22	
25	Cyprus	18	24	17	16	1	10	1	6	5
26	Italy	4	11	23	3	14	7	4	3	8
