= Montenegro in the Eurovision Song Contest 2009 =

- Eurovision Song Contest 2009
- Participating broadcaster: Radio and Television of Montenegro (RTCG)
- Country: Montenegro
- Selection process: Internal selection
- Announcement date: 23 January 2009

Competing entry
- Song: "Just Get Out of My Life"
- Artist: Andrea Demirović
- Songwriters: Ralph Siegel; Bernd Meinunger; José Juan Santana Rodríguez

Placement
- Semi-final result: Failed to qualify (11th)

Participation chronology

Montenegro was represented at the Eurovision Song Contest 2009 with the song "Just Get Out of My Life" written by Ralph Siegel, Bernd Meinunger and José Juan Santana Rodríguez. The song was performed by Andrea Demirović, who was internally selected by the Montenegrin broadcaster Radio i televizija Crne Gore (RTCG) to represent the nation at the 2009 contest in Moscow, Russia. Andrea Demirović was announced as the Montenegrin representative on 23 January 2009, while her song, "Just Get Out of My Life", was presented to the public on the same day. This was the first time that the Montenegrin song was performed entirely in the English language at the Eurovision Song Contest.

Montenegro was drawn to compete in the first semi-final of the Eurovision Song Contest which took place on 12 May 2009. Performing as the opening entry for the show in position 1, "Just Get Out of My Life" was not announced among the 10 qualifying entries of the first semi-final and therefore did not qualify to compete in the final. It was later revealed that Montenegro placed eleventh out of the 18 participating countries in the semi-final with 44 points.

== Background ==
Prior to the 2009 contest, Montenegro had participated in the Eurovision Song Contest as an independent nation two times since its first entry in its own right in 2007. To this point, Montenegro has yet to feature in a final. In 2008, the nation failed to qualify with the song "Zauvijek volim te" performed by Stefan Filipović. The Montenegrin national broadcaster, Radio i televizija Crne Gore (RTCG), broadcasts the event within Montenegro and organises the selection process for the nation's entry. RTCG confirmed that Montenegro would participate at the Eurovision Song Contest 2009 on 27 December 2008. Since 2007, the broadcaster organised the national final MontenegroSong to choose the performer, song or both to compete at Eurovision. For 2009, the broadcaster has opted to internally select both the artist and song that would represent Montenegro.

== Before Eurovision ==
=== Internal selection ===
On 27 December 2008, RTCG opened a submission period where artists and songwriters were able to submit their entries until 20 January 2009. RTCG received 22 entries at the closing of the deadline, including songs from singers FreeJack ("Ljubav je san"), Ivan Čanović and Merima Njegomir ("Kad bi dao Bog"), Nina Petković ("Srce balkansko") and Sergej Ćetković ("Sjenke ljubavi"). On 23 January 2009, "Just Get Out of My Life" performed by Andrea Demirović was announced and presented as the Montenegrin entry in the contest. Andrea Demirović previously attempted to represent Montenegro at the Eurovision Song Contest in 2008 where she placed second in the artist selection. Demirović also attempted to represent Serbia and Montenegro in 2005 where she placed fifth in their national final with the song "Šta će mi dani". The selection of the Montenegrin representative and song was decided by a selection jury that consisted of members of the RTCG Council: TVCG music editors Branka Banović and Vesna Ivanović, Radio Montenegro music editor Lidija Radović, director and producer Zoran Živković, sound engineer Dalibor Nedović and RTCG Heads of International Relations Boško Rašović and Vesna Banović.

"Just Get Out of My Life" was written by Ralph Siegel and Bernd Meinunger (initially entered under the pseudonyms Peter Match and Gunter Johansen, respectively) together with José Juan Santana Rodríguez. Ralph Siegel had previously composed 20 Eurovision entries for various countries, while 15 of the entries composed by Siegel were written by Bernd Meinunger. The song also contained a sample from the song "Innocent Heart" by Ruth Portelli, which was also written by the duo and competed in the 2009 Maltese Eurovision national final. "Just Get Out of My Life" was Montenegro's first entry in the contest to be performed entirely in the English language.

=== Promotion ===
Andrea Demirović made several appearances across Europe to specifically promote "Just Get Out of My Life" as the Montenegrin Eurovision entry. Andrea Demirović performed "Just Get Out of My Life" during the Greek Eurovision national final on 18 February, the final of the Macedonian Eurovision national final Skopje Fest 2009 on 21 February, the presentation show of the 2009 Bosnian Eurovision entry BH Eurosong Show 2009 on 1 March, and the semi-final of the Serbian Eurovision national final Beovizija 2009 on 7 March. On 18 April, Demirović performed during the Eurovision Promo Concert event which was held at the Amsterdam Marcanti venue in Amsterdam, Netherlands and hosted by Marga Bult and Maggie MacNeal. On 18 and 19 April, Demirović took part in promotional activities in Belgium and performed during an event held at the Place Sainte-Catherine/Sint-Katelijneplein in Brussels.

== At Eurovision ==
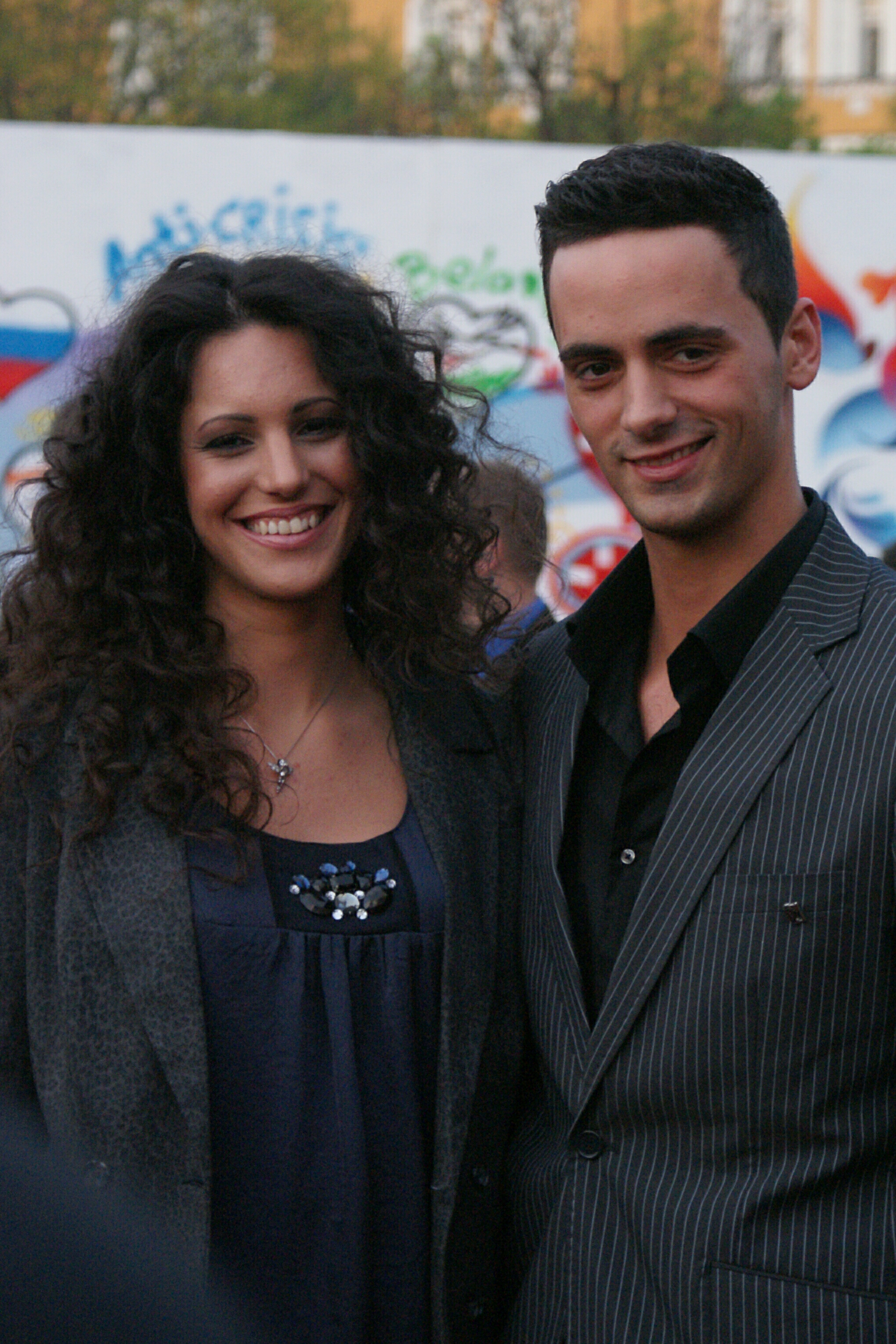
Andrea Demirović and dancer Nikola Tomašević at the Eurovision Opening Party in Moscow

According to Eurovision rules, all nations with the exceptions of the host country and the "Big Four" (France, Germany, Spain and the United Kingdom) are required to qualify from one of two semi-finals in order to compete for the final; the top nine songs from each semi-final as determined by televoting progress to the final, and a tenth was determined by back-up juries. The European Broadcasting Union (EBU) split up the competing countries into six different pots based on voting patterns from previous contests, with countries with favourable voting histories put into the same pot. On 30 January 2009, a special allocation draw was held which placed each country into one of the two semi-finals. Montenegro was placed into the first semi-final, to be held on 12 May 2009. The running order for the semi-finals was decided through another draw on 16 March 2009 and Montenegro was set to open the show and perform in position 1, before the entry from the Czech Republic.

The two semi-finals and the final were broadcast in Montenegro on TVCG 2 with commentary by Dražen Bauković and Tamara Ivanković. The Montenegrin spokesperson, who announced the Montenegrin votes during the final, was Jovana Vukčević.

=== Semi-final ===
Andrea Demirović took part in technical rehearsals on 3 and 7 May, followed by dress rehearsals on 11 and 12 May. The Montenegrin performance featured Andrea Demirović performing on stage in a silver and black dress with a dancer dressed in white. Demirović and the dancer performed a choreographed routine showing an animated dialogue between the performers with the LED screens displaying pink colours and pictures of silver fans, chains and padlocks. The dancer performing with Andrea Demirović was Nikola Tomašević and an additional three backing vocalists, Ariane Roth, Katrin Schild von Spannenberg and Peter Bischof, were also part of the performance.

At the end of the show, Montenegro was not announced among the top 10 entries in the first semi-final and therefore failed to qualify to compete in the final. It was later revealed that Montenegro placed eleventh in the semi-final, receiving a total of 44 points.

=== Voting ===
The voting system for 2009 involved each country awarding points from 1-8, 10 and 12, with the points in the final being decided by a combination of 50% national jury and 50% televoting. Each nation's jury consisted of five music industry professionals who are citizens of the country they represent. This jury judged each entry based on: vocal capacity; the stage performance; the song's composition and originality; and the overall impression by the act. In addition, no member of a national jury was permitted to be related in any way to any of the competing acts in such a way that they cannot vote impartially and independently.

Below is a breakdown of points awarded to Montenegro and awarded by Montenegro in the first semi-final and grand final of the contest. The nation awarded its 12 points to Bosnia and Herzegovina in the semi-final and the final of the contest.

==== Points awarded to Montenegro ====
Points awarded to Montenegro (Semi-final 1)
Score	Country
12 points	
10 points	Bosnia and Herzegovina
8 points	Macedonia
7 points	
6 points	Malta
5 points	Armenia; Turkey
4 points	
3 points	Belarus
2 points	Germany; Switzerland
1 point	Andorra; Israel; Portugal

==== Points awarded by Montenegro ====
Points awarded by Montenegro (Semi-final 1)
Score	Country
12 points	Bosnia and Herzegovina
10 points	Macedonia
8 points	Turkey
7 points	Iceland
6 points	Romania
5 points	Israel
4 points	Armenia
3 points	Finland
2 points	Belarus
1 point	Malta

Points awarded by Montenegro (Final)
Score	Country
12 points	Bosnia and Herzegovina
10 points	Norway
8 points	Croatia
7 points	Albania
6 points	Azerbaijan
5 points	Iceland
4 points	Israel
3 points	Turkey
2 points	Greece
1 point	France

==== Detailed voting results ====
Detailed voting results from Montenegro (Final)
R/O	Country	Results			Points
R/O	Country	Jury	Televoting	Combined	Points
01	Lithuania				
02	Israel	6		6	4
03	France	4		4	1
04	Sweden	2		2	
05	Croatia	7	10	17	8
06	Portugal				
07	Iceland	8		8	5
08	Greece		4	4	2
09	Armenia				
10	Russia		3	3	
11	Azerbaijan		8	8	6
12	Bosnia and Herzegovina	10	12	22	12
13	Moldova				
14	Malta	3		3	
15	Estonia	1		1	
16	Denmark				
17	Germany				
18	Turkey		5	5	3
19	Albania	5	6	11	7
20	Norway	12	7	19	10
21	Ukraine		1	1	
22	Romania		2	2	
23	United Kingdom				
24	Finland				
25	Spain				
