= Montenegro in the Eurovision Song Contest 2008 =

- Eurovision Song Contest 2008
- Participating broadcaster: Radio i Televizija Crne Gore (RTCG)
- Country: Montenegro
- Selection process: Artist: MontenegroSong 2008; Song: Internal selection
- Selection date: Artist: 27 January 2008; Song: 8 March 2008

Competing entry
- Song: "Zauvijek volim te"
- Artist: Stefan Filipović
- Songwriters: Grigor Koprov; Ognen Nedelkovski

Placement
- Semi-final result: Failed to qualify (14th)

Participation chronology

Montenegro was represented at the Eurovision Song Contest 2008 with the song "Zauvijek volim te" (Заувијек волим те), composed by Grigor Koprov, with lyrics by Ognen Nedelkovski, and performed by Stefan Filipović. The Montenegrin participating broadcaster, Radio i Televizija Crne Gore (RTCG), organised the national final MontenegroSong 2008 in order to select its performer for the contest and, subsequently, it selected the song internally. Six artists competed in the national final on 27 January 2008 where public televoting selected Stefan Filipović as the winner with 3,325 votes. The song, "Zauvijek volim te", was internally selected and presented to the public in a television special on 8 March 2008.

Montenegro was drawn to compete in the first semi-final of the Eurovision Song Contest which took place on 20 May 2008. Performing as the opening entry for the show in position 1, "Zauvijek volim te" was not announced among the 10 qualifying entries of the first semi-final and therefore did not qualify to compete in the final. It was later revealed that Montenegro placed fourteenth out of the 19 participating countries in the semi-final with 23 points.

== Background ==
Prior to the 2008 contest, Radio i Televizija Crne Gore (RTCG) had participated in the Eurovision Song Contest representing Montenegro as an independent country once: in 2007 when they failed to qualify to the final with the song "'Ajde, kroči" performed by Stevan Faddy.

As part of its duties as participating broadcaster, RTCG organises the selection of its entry in the Eurovision Song Contest and broadcasts the event in the country. The broadcaster confirmed that it would participate at the 2008 contest on 19 June 2007. In 2007, RTCG organised the national final MontenegroSong to select both the artist and song. For 2008, MontenegroSong was organised to select the performer, with the broadcaster opting to internally select the song later.

== Before Eurovision ==
=== MontenegroSong 2008 ===
MontenegroSong 2008 was the national final organised by RTCG in order to select its performer for the Eurovision Song Contest 2008. Six artists competed in a televised final on 27 January 2008, which was held at the Shass Disco in Podgorica, hosted by Dražen Bauković and Marija Vujović and was televised on TVCG 1 and TVCG SAT as well as broadcast online via the broadcaster's website rtcg.org. 13 artists were invited by the broadcaster for the competition and the six acts that accepted to participate were announced on 13 January 2008.

Invited artists
- Andrea Demirović
- Andrijana Božović
- Biljana Mitrović
- Bojan Delić
- Grim
- Jelena Kažanegra
- Vesna Milačić Kaja
- Nenad Knežević Knez
- Marija Božović
- Milena Vučić
- Perper
- Sergej Ćetković
- Stefan Filipović

==== Final ====
The final took place on 27 January 2008. Each of the six competing artists performed cover versions of two songs and Stefan Filipović was selected as the winner entirely by public televoting, the results of which were revealed by Montenegro's three telephone companies. 6,355 votes were received by the televote during the show. In addition to the performances of the competing artists, the show also featured guest performances by Stevan Faddy, who represented Montenegro in 2007, and Ruslan Alekhno, who would represent Belarus in 2008.

Final – 27 January 2008
R/O	Artist	First Song (Original artist)	Second Song (Original artist)	Televote	Place
1	Andrea Demirović	"I Will Always Love You" (Whitney Houston)	"La reina de la noche" (Mirela)	1,300	2
2	Grim	"The Power of Love" (Frankie Goes to Hollywood)	"Začaran" (Grim)	345	5
3	Jelena Kažanegra	"The Best" (Tina Turner)	"Kao mačka" (Fit)	377	4
4	Nenad Knežević Knez	"Balerina" (Makadam)	"Nijedna žena na svijetu" (Knez)	567	3
5	Vesna Milačić Kaja	"Here I Go Again" (Whitesnake)	N/A	341	6
6	Stefan Filipović	"Za nju" (Stefan Filipović)	"Nebo i more" (Stefan Filipović)	3,325	1

Detailed Televoting Results
R/O	Artist	T-Mobile	ProMonte	M-Tel	Total
1	Andrea Demirović	529	643	128	1,300
2	Grim	128	162	55	345
3	Jelena Kažanegra	152	174	51	377
4	Nenad Knežević Knez	241	271	55	567
5	Vesna Milačić Kaja	142	170	29	341
6	Stefan Filipović	1,325	1,068	932	3,325

=== Song selection ===
On 4 March 2008, RTCG announced "Zauvijek volim te" as Filipović's Eurovision song. The entry was decided from four songs submitted by composers invited by RTCG, and was presented during a television special on TVCG 2 on 8 March 2008. "Zauvijek volim te" was composed by Grigor Koprov, with lyrics by Ognen Nedelkovski; the duo was also responsible for the Macedonian song in 2007. An English version of the song, "Never Forget That I Love You", was also recorded.

=== Promotion ===
Stefan Filipović made several appearances across Europe to specifically promote "Zauvijek volim te" as the Montenegrin Eurovision entry. On 9 March, Stefan Filipović performed the song during the semi-final of the Serbian Eurovision national final Beovizija 2008. On 4 April, Filipović performed during the BHT 1 show Konačno petak in Bosnia and Herzegovina.

== At Eurovision ==
It was announced in September 2007 that the competition's format would be expanded to two semi-finals in 2008. According to Eurovision rules, all nations with the exceptions of the host country and the "Big Four" (France, Germany, Spain, and the United Kingdom) are required to qualify from one of two semi-finals in order to compete for the final; the top nine songs from each semi-final as determined by televoting progress to the final, and a tenth was determined by back-up juries. The European Broadcasting Union (EBU) split up the competing countries into six different pots based on voting patterns from previous contests, with countries with favourable voting histories put into the same pot. On 28 January 2008, a special allocation draw was held which placed each country into one of the two semi-finals. Montenegro was placed into the first semi-final, to be held on 20 May 2008. The running order for the semi-finals was decided through another draw on 17 March 2008 and Montenegro was set to open the show and perform in position 1, before the entry from Israel.

The two semi-finals and the final were broadcast in Montenegro on TVCG 2 with commentary by Dražen Bauković and Tamara Ivanković. RTCG appointed Nina Radulović as its spokesperson to announce the Montenegrin votes during the final.

=== Semi-final ===
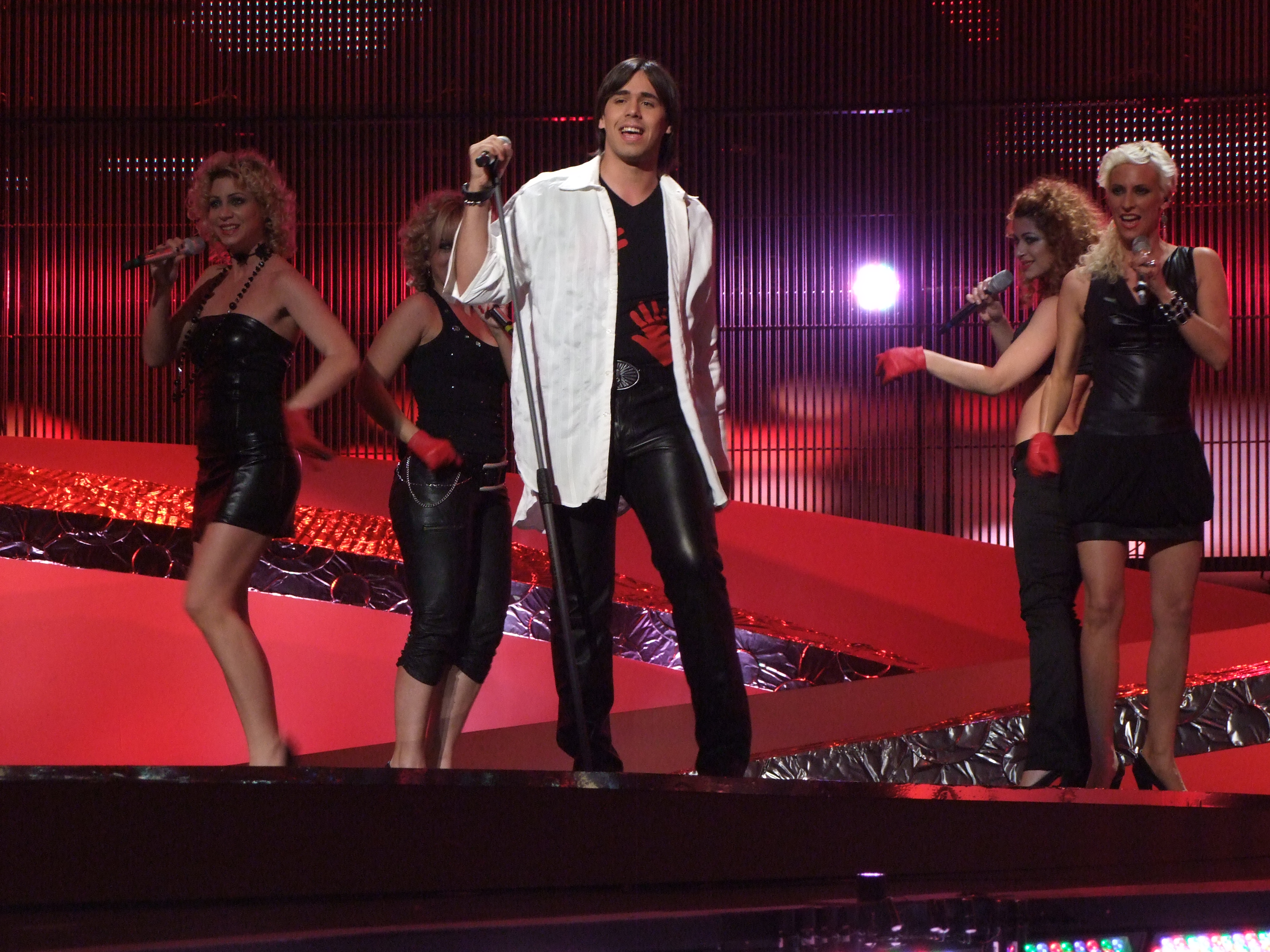
Stefan Filipović during a rehearsal before the first semi-final

Stefan Filipović took part in technical rehearsals on 14 and 17 May, followed by dress rehearsals on 21 and 22 May. The Montenegrin performance featured Stefan Filipović performing on stage in a white shirt, black leather trousers and a black t-shirt with printed red hands which symbolised love and rage that the singer was experiencing with women as well as "friendship", "solidarity" and "stop". Filipović was also joined by four backing vocalists/dancers dressed in black and wearing red gloves. In the middle of the song, the backing performers caressed Filipović's face with their hands. The LED screens displayed black, red and white colours. The four backing vocalists/dancers performing with Stefan Filipović are Amira Hidić, Ana Kabalin, Martina Majerle and Mateja Majerle. Majerle would go on to represent Slovenia in 2009 together with the group Quartissimo.

At the end of the show, Montenegro was not announced among the 10 qualifying entries in the first semi-final and therefore failed to qualify to compete in the final. It was later revealed that Montenegro placed fourteenth in the semi-final, receiving a total of 23 points.

=== Voting ===
Below is a breakdown of points awarded to Montenegro and awarded by Montenegro in the first semi-final and grand final of the contest. The nation awarded its 12 points to Bosnia and Herzegovina in the semi-final and to Serbia in the final of the contest.

==== Points awarded to Montenegro ====
Points awarded to Montenegro (Semi-final 1)
Score	Country
12 points	Bosnia and Herzegovina
10 points	Slovenia
8 points	
7 points	
6 points	
5 points	
4 points	
3 points	
2 points	
1 point	San Marino

==== Points awarded by Montenegro ====
Points awarded by Montenegro (Semi-final 1)
Score	Country
12 points	Bosnia and Herzegovina
10 points	Slovenia
8 points	Russia
7 points	Greece
6 points	Armenia
5 points	Israel
4 points	Norway
3 points	Azerbaijan
2 points	Finland
1 point	Ireland

Points awarded by Montenegro (Final)
Score	Country
12 points	Serbia
10 points	Bosnia and Herzegovina
8 points	Russia
7 points	Albania
6 points	Greece
5 points	Israel
4 points	Ukraine
3 points	Latvia
2 points	Croatia
1 point	Armenia
