= Montenegrin music festivals =

Music festivals in Montenegro

Montenegrin music festivals are a series of music festivals which showcase the top Montenegrin and all Ex-Yugoslavian musical acts, in different types of music. They usually involve live performances as well as awards given by festival jurors and those awarded by the fans. The majority of the festivals release a compilation of the songs entered.

== Pop Festivals ==
- Biser Jadrana
  - A competitive pop music festival held every summer in Tivat since 2024.
- Montesong
  - A national selection contest used to choose Montenegro’s entry for the Eurovision Song Contest. It is organised by RTCG and the Association of Variety Artists and Performers of Montenegro, and was introduced in 2024. Previously, Montenegro selected its entries through MontenegroSong in 2007 and 2008, and through Montevizija in 2018 and 2019. Montevizija was also previously used as the Montenegrin semifinal while Montenegro was in union with Serbia.
- Pjesma Mediterana
  - A competitive pop music festival held every summer in Budva. The festival ran annually from 1992 to 2011, with the exception of 1999 and 2002.
- Sunčane Skale
  - A competitive pop music festival held every summer in Herceg Novi. The festival ran annually from 1994 to 2015, with the exception of 1999 and 2016.

== Folk Festivals ==
- Cetinje Fest
  - A festival held annually in Cetinje. The first edition, Tivatfest, was held in the city of Tivat in August 2005, while the second was held in Bar and named Barfest. The festival focuses mainly on traditional folk music of the region, and the organizers are not allowing turbo-folk songs to participate.

== Children's music festivals ==
- Zlatna Pahulja and Zlatna Staza
  - These two festivals are held in Rožaje. Zlatna Pahulja focuses on the younger singers, while Zlatna Staza is for the older ones. They were first held in 1995.
- Male Skale
  - Male Skale festival is held in Bijela, near Herceg Novi. Started in 2005.

== Festivals with no competitive character ==
- Live Fest
  - Held annually on Jaz beach near Budva. It consists of performances of both internationally popular stars and famous Ex-Yu singers. The first edition was held in August 2008, and lasted for 3 days (with performances by: Lenny Kravitz, Armand Van Helden, Dino Merlin, Goran Bregović, Zdravko Čolić)
- Refresh Festival
  - Held annually in Maximus superclub in Kotor. Consists of performances of international and local electronic music stars and DJs. First held in August 2007.
