= Neonoen =

Montenegrin band

NeonoeN
- Also known as: Neon (2012–2023)
- Origin: Podgorica, Montenegro
- Genres: Indie rock; alternative rock; new rave
- Years active: 2012–present
- Members: Marko Vukčević; Ilija Pejović; Filip Vulanović; Milan Vujović

Neonoen, (Note: Serbo-Croatian: [neonǒen]) stylized as NeonoeN, is a Montenegrin rock band formed in 2012 in Podgorica. They were initially selected to represent Montenegro in the Eurovision Song Contest 2025 with the song "Clickbait", but later withdrew due to a controversy over having previously performed their song in June 2023.

== History ==
Neonoen, founded in Podgorica in early 2012 under the name Neon, is the result of the collaboration between singer Marko Vukčević and guitarist Ilija Pejović. After the passage of several other musicians, the lineup was definitively solidified with the recruitment of bassist Filip Vulanović and drummer Milan Vujović.

Despite their long activity on the local music scene, Neon released their debut single "Ti i ja solo" in 2018, finally starting to write original songs. In the same year, they were guests on the RTCG music program Obrati pažnju, where they performed some covers of famous songs, such as Lonely Boy by The Black Keys, "Za laku noć" by Perper, and "Još ne sviće rujna zora", a Montenegrin patriotic song. About three years later, in 2022, they collaborated with Ivan Dečak, frontman of the Croatian band Vatra, for the song "Daleko odavde".

In 2023, on the occasion of their tenth anniversary, Neon decided to change their name to Neonoen in order to avoid confusion with other bands both nationally and internationally. This change was accompanied by the production of two unreleased singles, which were premiered at the Zabjelo Cultural Festival. With the release of the song "Dok ne udahnem te", the band announced that they are working on their first album, which was scheduled for release in 2024.

On 10 October 2024, Neonoen's participation in Montesong 2024 was made official, an event dedicated to the selection of the Montenegrin representative at the Eurovision Song Contest 2025, where they sang the song Clickbait. On 27 November, during the final of the contest, the group triumphed after obtaining second place from both the jury and the televote, thus securing the right to represent Montenegro on the Eurovision stage in Basel.

Following the final of Montesong, it emerged that Neonoen had performed "Clickbait" in June 2023 at a music festival in Zabjelo, which was a breach of the rules of both Montesong and the Eurovision Song Contest. On 4 December 2024, the band announced their withdrawal as Montenegro's representative in the contest.

== Musical style ==
In an interview for the publication All About The Rock, Marko Vukčević described the band's music as indie rock containing elements of blues, rock, hard rock, heavy metal, punk rock, and pop.

== Members ==
=== Current members ===
- Marko Vukčević – vocals
- Ilija Pejović – guitar
- Filip Vulanović – bass
- Milan Vujović – drums

== Discography ==
=== Studio albums ===
- Huk na zvuk NeonoeN-a (2025)

=== Singles ===
- 2018 – "Ti i ja"
- 2018 – "Tattoo"
- 2019 – "Mit"
- 2022 – "Daleko odavde" (feat. Ivan Dečak)
- 2023 – "Dok ne udahnem te"
- 2023 – "Dječak sa vjetrom u kosi"
- 2024 – "Clickbait"

== Awards and nominations ==
Year	Award	Category	Nominee(s)	Result	Ref.
2024	Montefon Awards	Group of the Year	Neonoen	Won	
