= Marko Vukcevic =

Marko Vukcevic may refer to:

- Marko Vukčević (footballer) (born 1993), Montenegrin footballer
- Marko Vukčević (singer) (born 1979), Montenegrin singer
- Marko Vukcevich, American guitarist
- Marko Vukčić, a supporting character in the Nero Wolfe stories
