= Music industry (TV program) =

- Muzička industrija
- Genre: documentary, music
- Created by: Dražen Bauković
- Country of origin: Montenegro
- Original language: Serbo-Croatian
- No. of seasons: 2

Original release
- Network: RTCG
- Release: 2017 – 2019

Music industry (Serbian: Muzička industrija) is a TV show that deals with the topics of popular and fun music in the area of the former SFRY. The author of the show is eminent music journalist Dražen Bauković, and the broadcaster is RTCG.

== Synopsis ==
The first season was broadcast from December 2017 until June 2018. Topics included the participation of SFRY and its successors at Eurovision, famous musical families, music videos, etc.

The second season deals with the most famous albums of pop and rock music of SFRY.

== Legacy ==
In February 2020, Croatia Records released a five-part compilation inspired by the show. It was the first show to be found on CD.
