= Breathe (Vladana song) =

2022 song by Vladana Vučinić

Single by Vladana Vučinić
- Language: English
- Released: 4 March 2022
- Length: 3:00
- Label: Dimitrov
- Songwriters: Vladana Vučinić; Darko Dimitrov

Music video
- "Breathe" on YouTube

Eurovision Song Contest 2022 entry
- Country: Montenegro
- Artist: Vladana Vučinić
- Language: English

Finals performance
- Semi-final result: 17th
- Semi-final points: 33

Entry chronology
- ◄ "Heaven" (2019)
- "Dobrodošli" (2025) ►

"Breathe" is a song by Montenegrin singer Vladana Vučinić. The song represented Montenegro in the Eurovision Song Contest 2022 in Turin, Italy after being internally selected by Radio i televizija Crne Gore (RTCG), Montenegro's broadcaster for the Eurovision Song Contest.

== Background ==
"Breathe" was written by Vučinić herself, alongside Darko Dimitrov, who carried out the production and mixing. According to Vladana, the song is based on a difficult family ordeal Vladana suffered in 2021, when her mother died of COVID-19.

Vladana also recorded and released Finnish ("Jää"/Stay) and Italian ("Respira"/Breathe) versions of the song on her official YouTube channel.

== Release ==
The song was originally planned to be presented in February 2022, but this was later moved to 4 March.

== Eurovision Song Contest ==
=== Selection ===
On 28 October 2021, RTCG opened a submission period where artists and songwriters were able to submit their entries until 10 December 2021. At the closing of the deadline, RTCG received 30 entries, of which 24 were valid for consideration. A selection jury evaluated and marked the received submissions against a number of criteria: up to 50 points for composition, up to 30 points for lyrics and up to 20 points for the production potential of the composition.

On 4 January 2022, RTCG announced during the TVCG 1 morning show Dobro jutro Crna Goro that Vladana Vučinić would represent Montenegro in Turin. Vladana previously attempted to represent Serbia and Montenegro at the Eurovision Song Contest in 2005 with the song "Samo moj nikad njen" which failed to qualify from the Montenegrin semi-final, and in 2006 with the song "Željna" which she performed in a duet with Bojana Nenezić and placed fifteenth. In regards to her selection as the Montenegrin representative, Vladana stated: "I know that life is in both black and white keys, and everyday is a brand new song. That's why it's interesting. We only realise what it means to fight for a life when it begins to hurt, and when the cure is the only mission. This is my song, my cure for Europe, and for the world."

=== At Eurovision ===
According to Eurovision rules, all nations with the exceptions of the host country and the "Big Five" (France, Germany, Italy, Spain and the United Kingdom) are required to qualify from one of two semi-finals in order to compete for the final; the top ten countries from each semi-final progress to the final. The European Broadcasting Union (EBU) split up the competing countries into six different pots based on voting patterns from previous contests, with countries with favourable voting histories put into the same pot. On 25 January 2022, an allocation draw was held which placed each country into one of the two semi-finals, as well as which half of the show they would perform in. Montenegro was placed into the second semi-final, held on 12 May 2022, and performed in 15th position, during the second half of the show.
