= Stefan Filipović =

Montenegrin singer

Stefan Filipović Стефан Филиповић
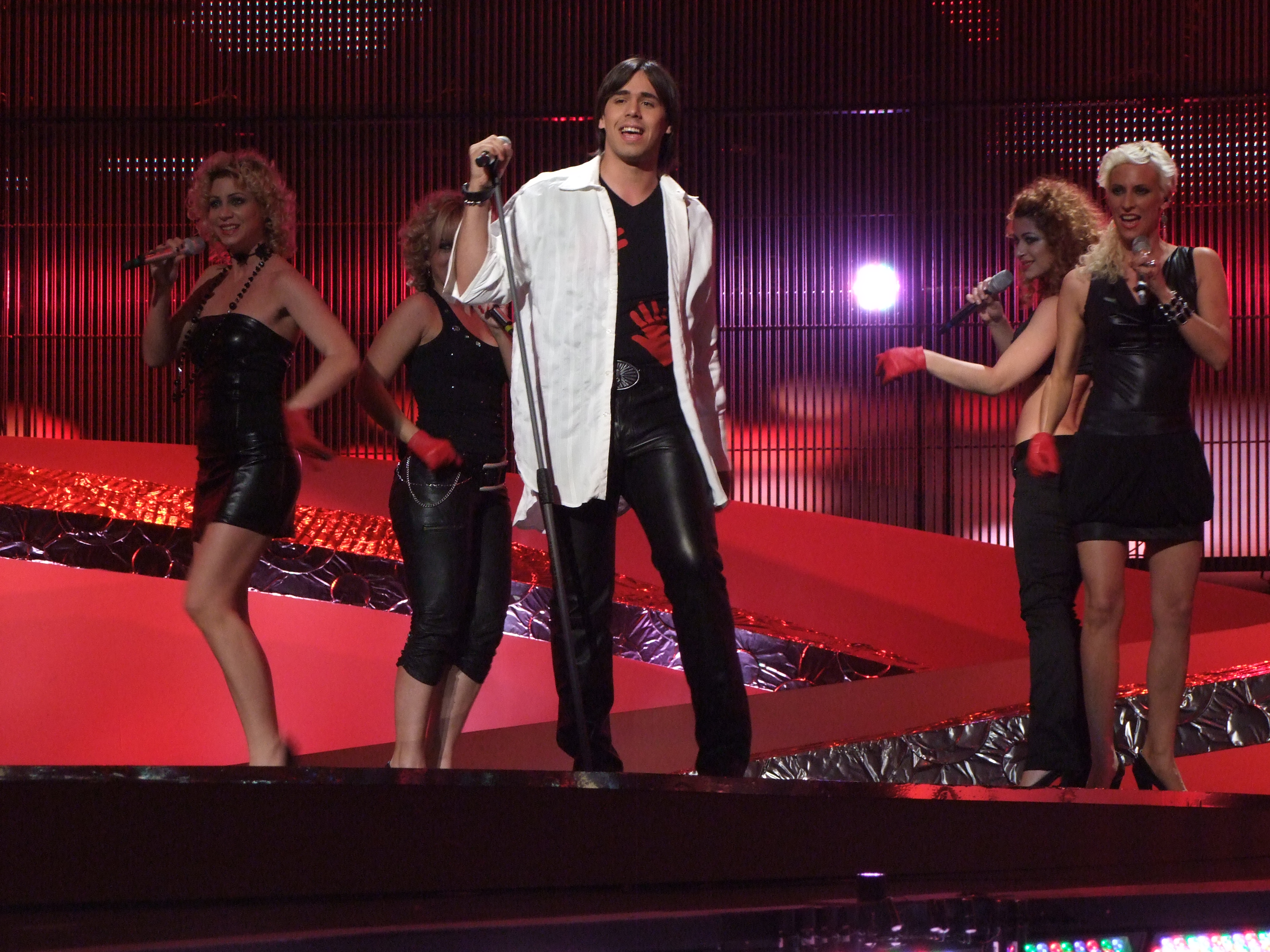
- Stefan Filipović in ESC 2008

Background information
- Birth name: Stefan Filipović
- Born: 18 January 1987 (age 38); Titograd, SR Montenegro, Yugoslavia
- Genres: Pop, disco
- Occupation: Singer
- Years active: 1999 - present

Stefan Filipović (Serbian Cyrillic: Стефан Филиповић) (born 18 January 1987) is a Montenegrin pop singer.

== Biography ==
Filipović was born in Titograd, now Podgorica, and studied in the Cetinje Music Academy. He started singing at age seven and he took part in various festivals in Montenegro and abroad. On 27 January he won MontenegroSong 2008, hence gaining the right to represent Montenegro in the Eurovision Song Contest 2008, that was held in Belgrade, Serbia. The song performed was chosen internally by a 30-member jury appointed by RTCG. The winning song was titled "Zauvijek volim te" (I love you for eternity), and was made by a team of Macedonian musicians - Grigor Koprov (author), Ognen Nedelkovski (composer) and Vladimir Dojčinovski (arranger), the same trio that created the Macedonian entry in 2007 - Mojot Svet. An English version of the song was also recorded, under the title "Never forget that I love you". The song's demo version was presented on Saturday 8 March and was rearranged until 15 March. Filipović performed the song at the first semi-final of the competition, but failed to reach the final having only received 23 points placing him 14th in a pool of 19.

== Singles ==
- Zujalica (Naša Radost - kids' festival, Podgorica)
- Đede Pero što je ovo (Naša Radost 1999)
- Deca imaju pravo (UNICEF kids festival, Tivat)
- Ringeringe raja (Naša Radost)
- Ja Mogao Bih Sve (Music Festival Budva 2005 - 4th place & Best Debutant Award)
- Ne Umijem (Sunflower Music Festival in Zrenjanin 2005 - 3rd place & Best Debutant Award)
- Za Nju (Evropesma 2006 - 4th place)
- Šećer i Voće (Music Festival Budva 2006 - 2nd place)
- Ne Mogu Bez Tebe (MontenegroSong 2007 - 2nd place)
- Nebo i More (Music Festival Budva 2007 - 1st place)
- Zauvijek Volim Te / Never Forget That I Love You (Eurovision Song Contest 2008)

Awards and achievements
Preceded by Stevan Faddy with 'Ajde, kroči	Montenegro in the Eurovision Song Contest; 2008	Succeeded by Andrea Demirović with Just Get Out of My Life
Preceded by Incanto	Music Festival Budva winner 2007	Succeeded by Ivan Čanović
