= TVCG 3 =

- Country: Montenegro
- Headquarters: Podgorica

Programming
- Picture format: 1080i (16:9) (HDTV)

Ownership
- Owner: RTCG
- Sister channels: TVCG 1; TVCG 2; TVCG MNE

History
- Launched: 2021; 5 years ago
- Former names: Parlamentarni program RTCG (2021–2022)

Links
- Website: www.rtcg.me

Availability

Terrestrial
- Digital: Channel 3

TVCG 3 is the third channel of Montenegrine broadcaster RTCG. It took over the broadcasts of the Parliament of Montenegro from TVCG 2.

== History ==
RTCG announced the creation of Parlamentarni kanal on 8 February 2021, per legal obligations. Approval was given in March, the channel was expected to operate on a 12-hour basis year-round. On 26 October 2021, the channel started airing Info Parlament during early evening hours. On 26 May 2022, the channel started broadcasting on RTCG's website.

== Controversies ==
On 26 September 2021, Parlamentarni kanal RTCG aired a religious ceremony of the enthronement of Bishop Metodija, which RTCG claimed not to be of its own production. It was criticized for airing on a channel set up for parliamentary affairs and would have easily aired on one of the two main RTCG channels, according to an interview given to the corporation's director to Vijesti.

On 25 February 2024, TVCG 3 aired "illegal political propaganda", specifically the coverage of a report of an assembly of the New Serb Democracy, violating the channel's neutrality.
