= Goran Vukošić =

Montenegrin singer

Goran Vukošić - Kenzo (Serbian Cyrillic: Горан Вукошић) is a popular Montenegrin turbo-folk singer. He lives in Belgrade, Serbia. His best known hit singles are Isti igrači (Same players), a duet with Mina Kostić, and Mala bez morala (Girl without moral).

== Discography ==
- Goran Vukošić (1999)
- Goran Vukošić (2001)
- Goran Vukošić (2003)
- Trenutak slabosti (2006)
- Svih ovih godina (2008)

== Awards and nominations ==
| Year | Award | Category | Nominee(s) | Result | Ref. |
|---|---|---|---|---|---|
| 2001 | Montefon Awards | Folk Album of the Year | Goran Vukošić | Won | |
