= Andrea Demirović =

Montenegrin singer (born 1986)

Andrea Demirović Андреа Демировић
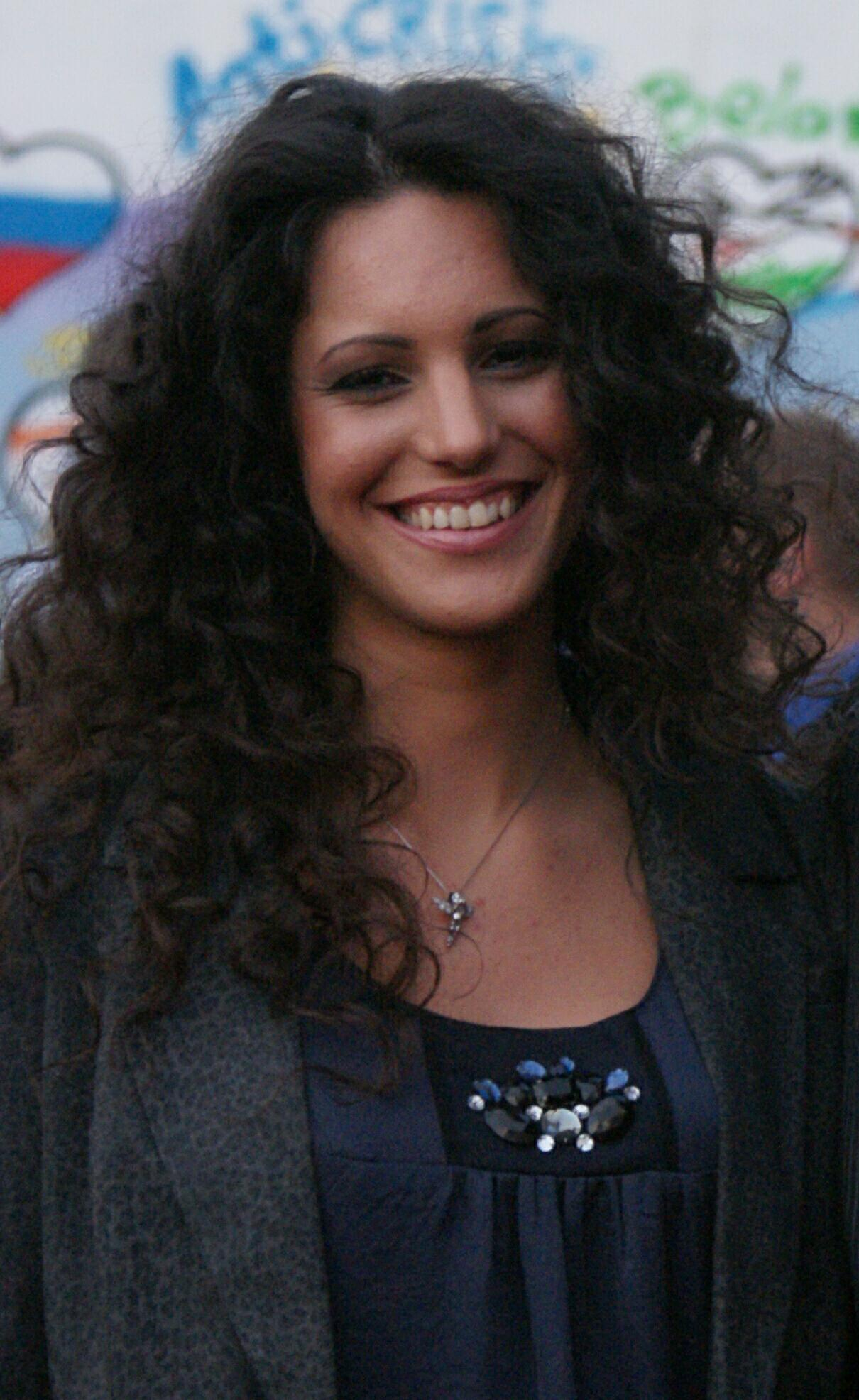
- Andrea (2009)

Background information
- Born: 17 June 1985 (age 41); Titograd, SR Montenegro, SFR Yugoslavia
- Origin: Podgorica, Montenegro
- Genre: Pop
- Occupation: Singer
- Instrument: Vocals

Andrea Demirović (Serbian Cyrillic: Андреа Демировић; born 17 June 1985), also known as simply Andrea, is a Montenegrin singer and a student of the Cetinje Music Academy – Music Pedagogy.

== Career ==
Demirović was born in Podgorica, Montenegro (then part of SFR Yugoslavia). Her breakthrough came at the Sunčane Skale festival in 2002. She then had considerable successes at regional festivals, including the Serbo-Montenegrin and Montenegrin national finals for selecting the Eurovision Song Contest entry. Her first album, titled "Andrea", was released in 2006, under the City Records label. She planned to release a follow-up album later in 2009, and the first single from the album is "The Queen of the Night", a cover of Mirela's Misión Eurovisión 2007 song.

On 23 January 2009, it was revealed that Andrea would represent Montenegro at the Eurovision Song Contest 2009 in Moscow, Russia. She was the first female singer to represent the nation at the contest and performed the song "Just Get Out of My Life". It was the opening song in the first semi-final on 12 May, however it failed to win a place in the final.

In 2013, Demirović competed in the 2013 Baltic Song Contest, performing "Odlazim".

In 2015, she took part in Odbrojavanje za Beč (Countdown to Vienna), the Serbian national final for the Eurovision Song Contest 2015 but did not win. The same year, she announced the Montenegrin votes at the contest.

She attempted to represent Montenegro at the Eurovision again, participating in Montenegrin national final in 2019 and 2026 but without success.

In 2021, Andrea made a duet with Bojan Jovović in ballad "Proljeće".

== Sources ==
- "Andrea Demirović, segunda artista confirmada para el Congresso de OGAE Spain 2016" [Andrea Demirović, second confirmed artist for the 2016 Spain OGAE Congress]. OGAE Spain (in Spanish). 2016.
- Granger, Anthony (1 January 2019). "Montenegro: "Ja sam ti san" Is Radically Different From Previous Montenegrin Entries – Andrea Demirović". Eurovoix News.
- Kiler, Marcus (23 January 2009). "Montenegro: Andrea Demirovic to Eurovision". ESC Today. Archived from the original on 25 January 2009.
- Randjelovic, Denis (21 June 2013). "Montenegro: Andrea Demirovic to compete at the 2013 Baltic Song Contest". ESC Today.

Awards and achievements
Preceded by Stefan Filipović with Zauvijek volim te	Montenegro in the Eurovision Song Contest; 2009	Succeeded by Rambo Amadeus with Euro Neuro
