= Marija Vujović =

Montenegrin model (born 1984)

- Born: 19 May 1984 (age 42); Titograd, Yugoslavia
- Spouse: Marko Vukčević (m. 2007)
- Modeling information
- Height: 1.80 m (5 ft 11 in)
- Hair color: Dark Brown
- Eye color: Brown
- Agency: Why Not Model Management (Milan); Elite Model Management (Amsterdam)

Marija Vujović (Montenegrin Cyrillic: Марија Вујовић, pronounced [mǎrija ʋûːjɔʋitɕ]) (born 19 May 1984 in Titograd, Yugoslavia, now Podgorica, Montenegro) is a Montenegrin Serb model.

== Biography ==
She was discovered by Elite Model Management in her hometown after friends talked her into participating and shot to fame at the Dries Van Noten show in Paris in 2002. She has been featured in campaigns for a Dolce & Gabbana fragrance and Yves Saint Laurent's Rive Gauche. In 2006, Dolce & Gabbana cast Vujović in their Light Blue fragrance adverts that were shot by photographer Mario Testino in Capri. The commercial received 11 million online views, and according to British researchers, is among the sexiest television adverts ever made.

Vujović was photographed by Steven Meisel for the Dolce & Gabbana campaign, by Mert & Marcus for Bulgari Eyewear and by Michael Thompson for RMK. She has also walked the catwalk for designers such as Calvin Klein, Donna Karan, and Gucci. Vujović walked in both the 2005 and 2007 Victoria's Secret fashion shows.

It was once falsely reported that she was related to the former President of Montenegro, Filip Vujanović. Actually, they are in no way related, as reported by the local media outlets.

She admires music and the stage: she studied classical piano for seven years at the Conservatory and has also taken acting lessons. She speaks English and Serbian. She has worked as a model in Serbia and in Montenegro.

== Personal life ==
Vujović has been married to Montenegrin singer Marko Vukčević since 2007. The couple has two daughters: Iris, born in March 2012, and Nora, born in November 2013.
