= Stevan Faddy =

Montenegrin singer

Stevan Faddy Стеван Фeди
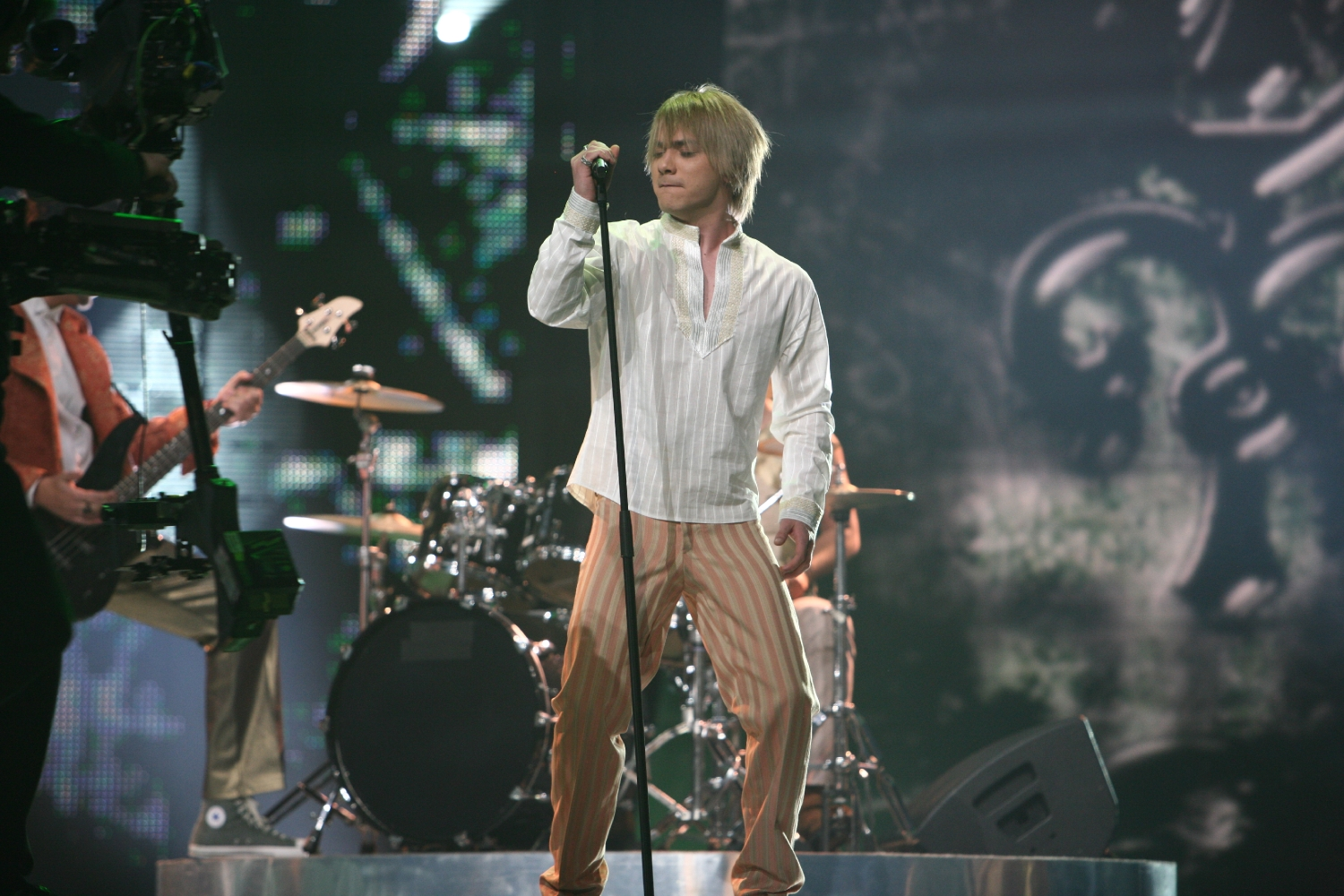
- Stevan performing at the 2007 Semi-Final.

Background information
- Born: Stevan Faddy; 2 September 1986 (age 40); Kotor, SR Montenegro, SFR Yugoslavia
- Genres: Pop music, Pop Rock
- Occupations: Composer, Singer, Producer
- Instruments: Piano, Multi-instrumetalis
- Years active: 2000–present
- Labels: Creative Works Production, Inc.

Stevan Faddy (Montenegrin: Стеван Фeди, romanized: Stevan Fedi; born 2 September 1986, in Kotor) is a Montenegrin musician. He took part in Montevizija 2005, with "Utjeha". He also participated in Sunčane Skale 2003 singing "Poslednja obala". On 25 February 2007, he won a landslide victory in MontenegroSong 2007 with his song "'Ajde Kroči" and won a ticket to represent Montenegro in the Eurovision Song Contest 2007 held in Helsinki, Finland.

== Music career ==
Faddy's first attempt to enter Eurovision came in Evropesma 2005, with "Utjeha". He won second place at Montevizija and fourth in the finals. At Montevizija in 2006, Faddy took first place with the song "Cipele," notably ahead of previous Evropesma winners No Name. At the finals, Faddy finished third.

On 25 February 2007, he won a landslide victory in MontenegroSong 2007 with his song "Ajde Kroči" and won a ticket to represent Montenegro in the Eurovision Song Contest 2007 held in Helsinki, Finland. He would fail to qualify for the final finishing a-joint 22nd along with Estonia in the competition's semifinal with 33 points.

== Discography ==
=== Singles ===
- Posljednja obala (Sunčane Skale 2003)
- Utjeha (Montevizija 2005 / Europjesma 2005)
- Cipele (Montevizija 2006 / Europjesma 2006)
- 'Ajde, Kroči (MontenegroSong 2007 / Eurovision Song Contest 2007)
- Dobri ljudi (2008)

== Awards and nominations ==
Year	Award	Category	Nominee(s)	Result	Ref.
2003	Montefon Awards	Discovery of the Year	Himself	Won	
2007	Montefon Awards	First Eurovision Representative of Independent Montenegro	Himself	Won	

== Personal life ==
Stevan was the first singer representing Montenegro after its independence. He is currently living in Podgorica, Montenegro.

Awards and achievements
Preceded by None (first time entry)	Montenegro in the Eurovision Song Contest; 2007	Succeeded by Stefan Filipović with Zauvijek volim te
Preceded by No Name with Zauvijek moja	Montevizija winner 2006	Succeeded by None (last entry chosen)
