= Kejt =

Montenegrin singer and actress (born 1998)

Kejt Кејт
- Birth name: Katarina Bogićević
- Born: 17 March 1998 (age 27); Podgorica, Montenegro, FR Yugoslavia
- Genres: Pop
- Occupations: Singer; actress
- Years active: 2007–present
- Labels: DJ Tunes; Kontra; Mascom

Katarina Bogićević (Montenegrin: Катарина Богићевић; born 17 March 1998), known professionally as Kejt, is a Montenegrin singer and actress. She became known with the role of Zvezdana in the series Folk (2012–2014). She participated in the competition Ja imam talenat! and the program Tvoje lice zvuči poznato. Bogićević competed at the Montevizija 2018 with the song "Neželjena". The song qualified for the final but finished runner-up. Kejt also competed at Montesong 2024 with the song "Obala raja". The song placed fifth overall in the final.

== Personal life ==
Bogićević comes from a musical family, her father Veselin is a clarinet teacher, and her mother Diana is a composer of children's music. She is in a relationship with rapper Kendi.

== Discography ==
=== Singles ===
==== Children's songs ====
- "Dečije pesme Čudna priča"
- "Milutine - naša radost" (2007)
- "Polarna pjesma" (2007)
- "Drugarice" (2009)

==== As Katarina Bogićević ====
- "Reciklaža" (2013)
- "Mito bekrijo (serija Folk)"
- "Bez riječi" (2014)
- "Perfect" (2017) with STO1K
- "Neželjena" (2018)

==== As Kejt ====
- "Hoću da igram" (2018)
- "Mikelanđelo" (2019)
- "Cure sa Balkana" (2020)
- "Olovo (2022) Sunčane Skale
- "Eva" (2022) with Sajsi MC and Tijara
- "Pola pola" (2023) duet with Kendi
- "Šaman" (2023)
- "Azurna noć" (2024)
