= Gojko Berkuljan =

Montenegrin painter (1923 – 1989)

Gojko Berkuljan (Montenegrin: Gojko Berkuljan/ Гојко Беркуљан; Nikšić, September 6, 1923 – Cetinje, December 21, 1989) was a Montenegrin painter of Romanian origin.

== Biography ==
He was born in Nikšić but his family moved to Cetinje, former administrative center of Montenegro, where he attended elementary and high school. Gojko Berkuljan graduated in 1950 from the School of Arts in Herceg Novi, where he studied painting in the class of professors Milo Milunović and Petar Lubarda. The director of this institution at the time was Milos Vusković, distinguished painter and caricaturist. During the studies Berkuljan participated in preservation and copying of the frescoes in the Patriarchate of Peć and other monasteries located in Serbia, Montenegro and Macedonia. After graduation, he worked for a couple of years as technical director of the journal Pobjeda (Victory) and conservator for paintings on canvas at the Institute for Protection of the Monuments of History in Cetinje. In 1951 he formed together with his friends and colleagues Branko Filipović and Aleksandar Prijić the artistic group “Trojica”. Their works based on non-common approach were commented as a rebellion against socialist realism and other artistic stereotypes of the period. In 1952 Berkuljan started to work as scenographist at the oldest Montenegrin Theatre “Zetski Dom” and the “Theatre for children Rajko Begovič”, where he designed more than 200 paintings of the stage scenery. Before getting retired he also covered briefly the position of the general manager of the National Theatre of Montenegro in Podgorica. Gojko Berkuljan participated in all most important events related to the Montenegrin art scene. He was also initiator and one of the founders of the international exhibition “Salon 13 November” and initiator of the former Museum of Theatre in Cetinje. During the years the artist created a large number of paintings that evolved radically in form and substance through different techniques and phases, mostly inspired by Montenegrin landscape and epics. Berkuljan won many awards and obtained two scholarships: for specialization in Italy (1954) and France (1959). He was a member of ULUCG (Association of Visual Artists of Montenegro).
