= Pjesma Mediterana =

Pjesma Mediterana (Serbo-Croatian Cyrillic: Пјесма Медитерана, lit. 'Song of the Mediterranean'; formerly Music Festival Budva, Serbo-Croatian: Muzički festival Budva, Музички фестивал Будва) was a pop music festival held every summer in Budva, Montenegro until 2011.

The festival began in 1992. There have been various sponsors of the festival, including: Komuna, Music Star Production and the Municipality of Budva. Since 2008, the municipality of Budva, HTP Budvanska Rivijera (a tourist company in Budva) and Copyright Ltd. have run the organisation. The executive producer from 2008 is Copyright Ltd. In 2011, the festival was cancelled reportedly due to financial crisis.

== The Festival ==
Budva's summer music festival is the only open air music festival on the Balkans with a live band. The festival lasts three days. Day 1 and day 2 are the semi-finals and day 3 is the final day. It is usually held in June.

== Hosts and winners ==
Past presenters
Year	Hosts	Winner
1992		Slobodan Kovačević - Montenegro
1993		Mićo Vujović - Budvo mati moja
1994		Makadam - Da mi je znati
1995		Željko Samardžić - Sipajte mi još jedan viski
1996		Bisera Veletanlić - Jedno leto kasno
1997		Extra Nena - Odlazim
1997		Tanja Banjanin - Ja činim sve
1998		Čobi i Mima Karadžić - Anka Kotoranka
1998		Leontina Vukomanović - Daleko
2000		Aleksandar Tabaš i Branislav Popović - Sivi Soko
2001		Saša Vasić - K'o lijana
2003		Saša Matić - Moj grad and Dado Topić - Bajka o ljubavi
2004		Marija Šerifović - Bol do ludila
2005		Tijana Dapčević - Sve je isto samo njega nema
2006		Incanto - Čarolija
2007		Stefan Filipović - Nebo i more
2008	Oliver Mlakar; Aleksandra Jeftanović; Jelena Šćepanović	Ivan Čanović - Tebi pjevam Budvo
2009	Ognjen Amidžić; Nikolina Pišek; Jelena Šćepanović	Nina Petković - S druge strane sna
2010	Ana Sofrenović; Dragan Mićanović; Boško Jakovljević	Slađana Milošević & Dado Topić - Kad reči zastanu

== See also ==
- Montenegrin music festivals
