= Montenegro in the Eurovision Song Contest 2007 =

- Eurovision Song Contest 2007
- Participating broadcaster: Radio i Televizija Crne Gore (RTCG)
- Country: Montenegro
- Selection process: MontenegroSong 2007
- Selection date: 25 February 2007

Competing entry
- Song: "'Ajde, kroči"
- Artist: Stevan Faddy
- Songwriters: Slaven Knezović; Milan Perić

Placement
- Semi-final result: Failed to qualify (22nd)

Participation chronology

Montenegro was represented at the Eurovision Song Contest 2007 with the song "'Ajde, kroči", composed by Slaven Knezović, with lyrics by Milan Perić, and performed by Stevan Faddy. The Montenegrin participating broadcaster, Radio i Televizija Crne Gore (RTCG), organised the national final MontenegroSong 2007 in order to select its entry for the contest. This was the first-ever entry from independent Montenegro in the Eurovision Song Contest.

Ten entries competed in the national final on 25 February 2007 where public televoting selected "'Ajde, kroči" performed by Stevan Faddy as the winner with 4,747 votes.

Montenegro competed in the semi-final of the Eurovision Song Contest which took place on 10 May 2007. Performing during the show in position 7, "'Ajde, kroči" was not announced among the top 10 entries of the semi-final and therefore did not qualify to compete in the final. It was later revealed that Montenegro placed twenty-second out of the 28 participating countries in the semi-final with 33 points.

== Background ==
On 13 October 2006, the Montenegrin national broadcaster, Radio i Televizija Crne Gore (RTCG), confirmed its intentions to debut at the Eurovision Song Contest in its 2007 edition representing Montenegro as an independent country following the dissolution of the State Union of Serbia and Montenegro. Entries from Montenegro had previously participated in the Eurovision Song Contest from 1961 to 1992 as part of Yugoslavia, and in 2004 and 2005 as part of Serbia and Montenegro. RTCG used a national final format to select its entry in the 2007 contest.

== Before Eurovision ==
=== MontenegroSong 2007 ===
MontenegroSong 2007 was the national final organised by RTCG in order to select the Montenegrin entry for the Eurovision Song Contest 2007. Ten entries competed in a televised final on 25 February 2007, which was held during the TVCG programme Nedjeljno popodne at the RTCG studios in Podgorica and hosted by Dražen Bauković and Olivera Simunović.

==== Competing entries ====
On 13 January 2007, RTCG opened a submission period where artists and songwriters were able to submit their entries until 9 February 2007. All artists and songwriters were required to be citizens of Montenegro and songs were required to be written in the Montenegrin language. RTCG received 16 entries at the closing of the deadline. A selection jury that consisted of KIC "Budo Tomović" music editor Maja Popović, composer Slobodan Kovačević and RTCG music editor Vesna Ivanović evaluated the received submissions and selected the top ten entries for the national final. The selected artists were announced on 14 February 2007 and their songs were announced on 17 February 2007.

Artist	Song	Songwriter(s)
Crveno i crno	"Luda sam bez tebe" (Луда сам без тебе)	Mihailo Radonjić, Goran Atanasković
Dalibor Dado Đurović	"Zašto" (Зашто)	Sergej Ćetković
Grim	"Kada ona ljubi te" (Када она љуби те)	Nebojsa Đukanović
Ivana Radinović	"Nemam snage" (Немам снаге)	Mihailo Radonjić, Momcilo Zeković-Zeko
Marko Vukčević	"Svaki put me tebi vodi" (Сваки пут ме теби води)	Marko Vukčević, Slaven Vukčević
Milena Vidaković	"Duga" (Дуга)	Svetlana Raicković
Nina and Dan poslije	"Anđele" (Анђеле)	Zoran Radonjić, Nina Petković
Rolly	"Kad se sjetim" (Кад си с́етим)	Pjetar Dedivanović, Ljubo Jovović, V. Dedivanović
Stefan Filipović	"Ne mogu bez tebe" (Не могу без тебе)	Mirsad Serhatlić, Sanja Perić
Stevan Faddy	"'Ajde, kroči"	Slaven Knezović, Milan Perić

==== Final ====
The final took place on 25 February 2007. The ten competing entries were performed and "'Ajde, kroči" performed by Stevan Faddy was selected as the winner entirely by public televoting. 11,006 votes were received by the televote during the show. In addition to the performances of the competing entries, the show also featured guest performances by 2005 Serbian and Montenegrin Eurovision entrant No Name, 2007 Belarusian Eurovision entrant Dmitry Koldun and 2007 Slovenian Eurovision entrant Alenka Gotar.

Final – 25 February 2007
R/O	Artist	Song	Televote			Place
R/O	Artist	Song	Phone	SMS	Total	Place
1	Marko Vukčević	"Svaki put me tebi vodi"	115	730	845	3
2	Crveno i crno	"Luda sam bez tebe"	24	113	137	10
3	Grim	"Kada ona ljubi te"	93	480	573	5
4	Milena Vidaković	"Duga"	67	305	372	6
5	Nina and Dan poslije	"Anđele"	91	513	604	4
6	Rolly	"Kad se sjetim"	32	229	261	9
7	Stefan Filipović	"Ne mogu bez tebe"	474	2,368	2,842	2
8	Dalibor Dado Đurović	"Zašto"	62	261	323	7
9	Stevan Faddy	"'Ajde, kroči"	756	3,991	4,747	1
10	Ivana Radinović	"Nemam snage"	55	247	302	8

=== Promotion ===
Stevan Faddy specifically promoted "'Ajde, kroči" as the Montenegrin Eurovision entry on 8 March 2007 by performing the song during the final of the Serbian Eurovision national final Beovizija 2007.

== At Eurovision ==
According to Eurovision rules, all nations with the exceptions of the host country, the "Big Four" (France, Germany, Spain and the United Kingdom) and the ten highest placed finishers in the 2006 contest are required to qualify from the semi-final on 10 May 2007 in order to compete for the final on 12 May 2007. On 12 March 2007, a special allocation draw was held which determined the running order for the semi-final and Montenegro was set to perform in position 7, following the entry from Georgia and before the entry from Switzerland.

The two semi-finals and the final were broadcast in Montenegro on TVCG 2 with commentary by Dražen Bauković and Tamara Ivanković. RTCG appointed Vidak Latković as its spokesperson to announce the Montenegrin votes during the final.

=== Semi-final ===
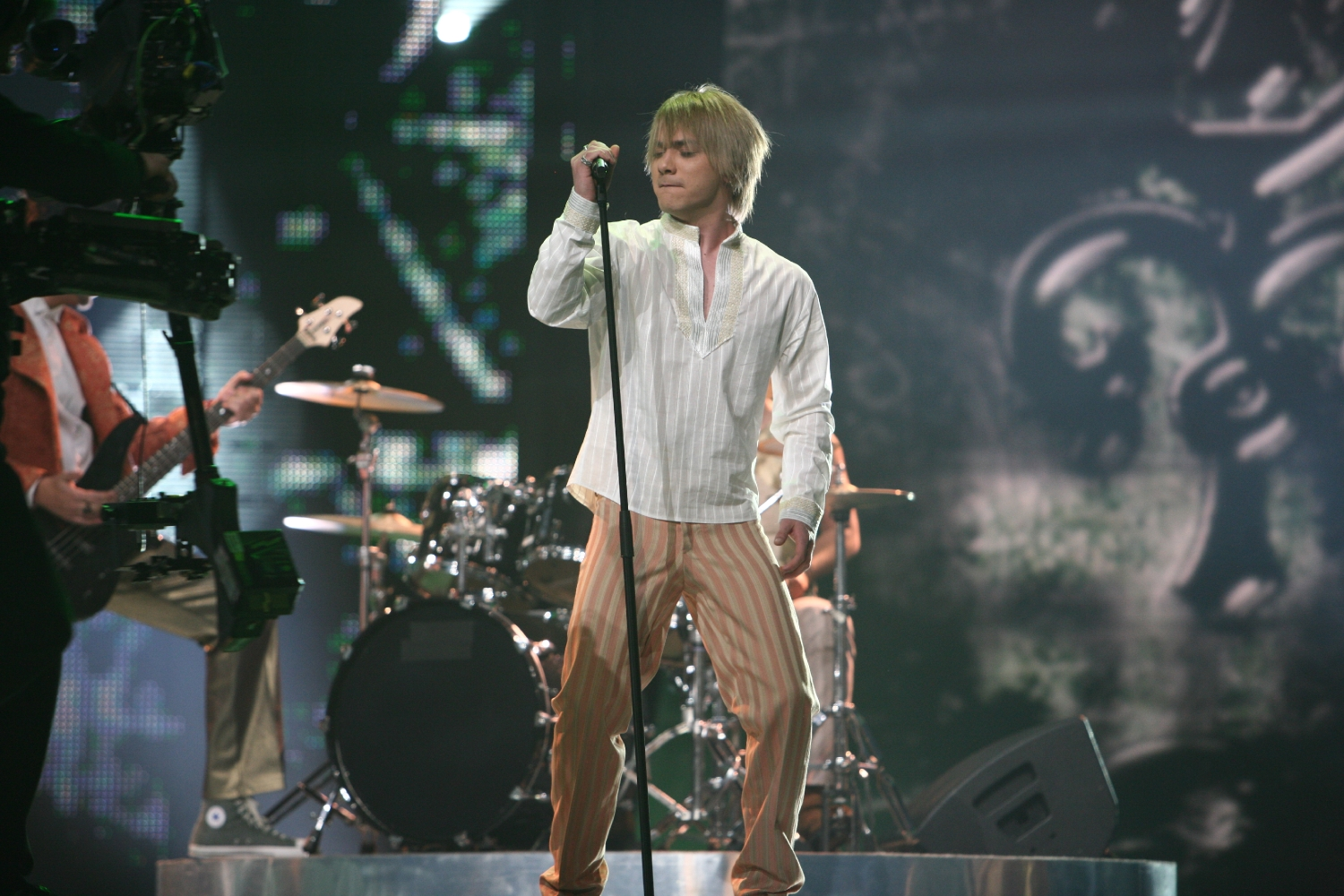
Stevan Faddy during a rehearsal before the semi-final

Stevan Faddy took part in technical rehearsals on 3 and 5 May, followed by dress rehearsals on 11 and 12 May. The Montenegrin performance featured Stevan Faddy on stage with two bassists and a drummer in a band set-up. In the climax of the performance, the two bassists leaned towards the drummer with the camera spinning around the musicians. The LED screens displayed blue and grey colours with white light effects being used. The three musicians performing with Stevan Faddy were Jovan Coso (drums), Marko Perić (bass) and the co-composer of "'Ajde, kroči" Slaven Knezović (bass). Marko Perić previously represented Serbia and Montenegro as part of No Name. Two backing vocalists, Neda Papović and Svetlana Raicković, were also part of the performance.

At the end of the show, Montenegro was not announced among the top 10 entries in the semi-final and therefore failed to qualify to compete in the final. It was later revealed that Montenegro placed twenty-second in the semi-final, receiving a total of 33 points.

=== Voting ===
Below is a breakdown of points awarded to Montenegro and awarded by Montenegro in the semi-final and grand final of the contest. The nation awarded its 12 points to Serbia in the semi-final and the final of the contest.

==== Points awarded to Montenegro ====
Points awarded to Montenegro (Semi-final)
Score	Country
12 points	
10 points	
8 points	Serbia
7 points	Albania
6 points	
5 points	Bosnia and Herzegovina; Croatia; Slovenia
4 points	
3 points	Macedonia
2 points	
1 point	

==== Points awarded by Montenegro ====
Points awarded by Montenegro (Semi-final)
Score	Country
12 points	Serbia
10 points	Macedonia
8 points	Slovenia
7 points	Croatia
6 points	Albania
5 points	Bulgaria
4 points	Belarus
3 points	Turkey
2 points	Norway
1 point	Poland

Points awarded by Montenegro (Final)
Score	Country
12 points	Serbia
10 points	Macedonia
8 points	Slovenia
7 points	Bosnia and Herzegovina
6 points	Russia
5 points	Bulgaria
4 points	Spain
3 points	Belarus
2 points	Ukraine
1 point	Turkey
