= TVCG MNE =

- Country: Montenegro
- Headquarters: Podgorica

Programming
- Picture format: 1080i (16:9) (HDTV)

Ownership
- Owner: RTCG
- Sister channels: TVCG 1; TVCG 2; TVCG 3

History
- Launched: 1999; 27 years ago
- Former names: RTCG Sat (1999–2012); TVCG Sat (2012–2022)

Links
- Website: www.rtcg.me

TVCG MNE is the international channel of Radio Television of Montenegro (RTCG). Broadcasting via satellite, its purpose is to cater the Montenegrin diaspora, with its programming portraying Montenegro as "a multicultural and multireligious society".

== History ==
The channel started broadcasting in 1999 in analog format, but moved entirely to digital in 2001. In June 2007, the channel was added to Hotbird 8, but was removed in February 2010.

On 1 December 2012, due to budget cuts, RTCG opted to close TVCG Sat's broadcasts on the Eutelsat 16A satellite due to lack of payments. Its signal was restored on 19 December.

On 20 October 2018, the channel ceased transmission on the Telekom Srbija transponder on Astra 3B, limiting its carriage exclusively to Eutelsat 16A. On 1 January 2020, the SD signal was switched off, leaving the channel exclusively in HD.

On 21 September 2022, the channel changed its named to TVCG MNE. The aim is that, with the name MNE (derived from Montenegro), viewers can easily identify its source country.
