= Marko Vukčević (singer) =

Montenegrin rock singer (born c. 1979)

- Born: November 8, 1979 (age 46); Titograd, (Note: Now known as Podgorica) SR Montenegro, SFR Yugoslavia
- Occupation: Singer-songwriter
- Years active: 2000–present
- Member of: Neonoen (2012–present)
- Formerly of: Evropa (2004)
- Spouse: Marija Vujović (2007–present)

Marko Vukčević (born 8 November 1979) is a Montenegrin singer-songwriter and the lead vocalist of the band Neonoen, which he co-founded in 2012.

== Biography ==
He completed both lower and upper levels of music education at the Vasa Pavić Music School in Podgorica, Montenegro, where he studied violin and piano. He has played the guitar since the age of five.

Vukčević made his first major festival appearance in February 2004 as a member of the band Evropa during Evropesma-Europjesma, the Serbian–Montenegrin national selection for the Eurovision Song Contest. In July of the same year, he performed as a solo artist at the Sunčane Skale festival in Herceg Novi, Montenegro with the song "More moje".

In 2005, he returned to Evropesma-Europjesma with the song "Govor tijela", which became a major hit in Montenegro and beyond. A music video for the song was later released, directed by Nikola Vukčević.

In 2007, he competed for the third time in a Eurovision national selection, this time in MontenegroSong to represent the independent Montenegro, with the song “Svaki put me tebi vodi”. Shortly afterward, he participated in the Pjesma Mediterana festival in Budva, Montenegro, with the song "Ja priznajem sve".

In early 2008, he released a music video for the song "Ne zaslužuješ me", directed by Nikola Vukčević. The video also features his wife, fashion model Marija Vujović.

His 2012 debut studio album, Suza od stakla, was recorded in Belgrade, Serbia, at Vlado Georgiev's studio and features a wide range of prominent musicians and vocalists, including Saša Vasić, Sergej Ćetković, Slaven Knezović, and Bojan Jovović. It was his first album to be advertised with road billboards in Montenegro. Others who worked on the album. That same year, Vukčević co-founded the band Neon (now Neonoen) in Podgorica with guitarist Ilija Pejović.

== Discography ==
=== Studio albums ===
Suza od stakla, 2012

=== Songs ===
- "Zauvijek", 2000
- "Evropa", 2004 (as part of Evropa band; Evropesma-Europjesma 2004)
- "More moje", 2004 (Sunčane Skale 2004)
- "Govor tijela", 2005 (Evropesma-Europjesma 2005)
- "Svaki put me tebi vodi", 2007 (MontenegroSong 2007)
- "Ja priznajem sve", 2007 (Pjesma Mediterana 2007)
- "Ne zaslužuješ me", 2008

== Personal life ==
Vukčević has been married to Montenegrin fashion model Marija Vujović since 2007. The couple has two daughters: Iris, born in March 2012, and Nora, born in November 2013.

== Footnotes ==
1. Now known as Podgorica
