= Perper (band) =

Montenegrin pop rock band

- Origin: Cetinje, Montenegro
- Genres: Pop rock, Rock and roll
- Years active: 1991–present
- Labels: Goraton, Perper Music
- Members: Nikola Radunović; Aleksandar Radunović; Ivan Vujović; Momčilo Zeković; Mihailo Ražnatović

Perper is a Montenegrin pop rock band from Cetinje. The band was founded in December 1991 and today it is one of the most popular rock bands in Montenegro.

== Members ==
- Niko (Nikola Radunović; born 1974) - vocals, acoustic guitar
- Popaj (Aleksandar Radunović; born 1971) - guitar; accompanying vocals
- Mane (Ivan Vujović; born 1971) - drums
- Zeko (Momčilo Zeković; born 1967) - bass guitar
- Mikelanđelo (Mihailo Ražnatović; born 1972) - keyboards, accompanying vocals

=== Notes ===
- Band guitarist Aleksandar Radunović Popaj is also a member of alternative group The Books of Knjige.

== Discography ==
=== Studio albums ===
- Sa gomile velikih oblaka (1992)
- Bludni snovi (1993)
- Perper uživo iz CNP-a (2000)
- Iz dana u dan (2002)
- Tragovi (2008)

=== Singles ===
- Mir kao peto godišnje doba (1991)
- Godine (1992)
- Još uvijek čekam te (1997)
- Sa dušom od kamena (2000)
- Neđelja (2000)
- Dodir svile (2004)
- Hrabri sokoli (2007)
- Niz tvoja leđa (2015)
- Sloboda (2019)

=== Compilations ===
- Perper (Kompilacijsko izdanje) (1998)

== Awards and nominations ==
Year	Award	Category	Nominee(s)	Result	Ref.
2001	Montefon Awards	Group of the Year	Perper	Won	
2002	Montefon Awards	Group of the Year	Perper	Won	
2002	Montefon Awards	Songwriter of the Year	Momčilo Zeković (Zeko)	Won	
2004	Montefon Awards	Video of the Year	"Sa dušom od kamena" directed by Mirko Matović	Won	
