= TVCG 2 =

- Country: Montenegro
- Headquarters: Podgorica

Programming
- Picture format: 1080i (16:9) (HDTV)

Ownership
- Owner: RTCG
- Sister channels: TVCG 1; TVCG 3; TVCG MNE

History
- Launched: 1971; 55 years ago
- Former names: Televizija Titograd (1977–1991)

Links
- Website: www.rtcg.me

Availability

Terrestrial
- Digital: Channel 2

TVCG 2 is the second channel of Montenegrin broadcaster RTCG. The channel specializes in sports and minority interest programming. Until the creation of TVCG 3, the channel also aired live broadcasts from the Parliament of Montenegro.

== History ==
Radio Television Titograd started broadcasting a second channel in the early 1970s on UHF channel 37 from Bjelasica. During the Yugoslav era, RTT 2 relayed RTB 2 from Belgrade.

By 2004, TVCG 2 aired a handful of Latin American telenovelas in its schedule. The channel also aired Studio Sport 2, a daily sports news service with two editions.

In March 2020, due to the pandemic, TVCG 2 started airing classes in the Albanian language, limited to the language and mathematics.

Following the implementation of RTCG's new brand identity in 2024, TVCG 2's signature color became yellow. The new channel logo was seen with controversy from netizens, as the 2 resembled the Russian military symbol Z. The Ukrainian embassy in Montenegro sent a letter to RTCG, while the broadcaster denied these allegations.
