= TVCG 1 =

- Country: Montenegro
- Headquarters: Podgorica

Programming
- Picture format: 1080i (16:9) (HDTV)

Ownership
- Owner: RTCG
- Sister channels: TVCG 2; TVCG 3; TVCG MNE

History
- Launched: 4 May 1964; 61 years ago
- Former names: Televizija Titograd (1964–1991); RTCG 1 (1991–2012)

Links
- Website: www.rtcg.me

Availability

Terrestrial
- Digital: Channel 1

TVCG 1 is a Montenegrin television channel that is part of Radio Television of Montenegro (RTCG). It was established in 1964 under the auspices of RTT. The channel specializes mainly in news and national productions.

== History ==
Although relays of Italian television have been available in Montenegro under Yugoslav rule since 1956, it wasn't until 4 May 1964 when the local television station started. On this day, the first news report from the Titograd newsroom was presented. By 1968, the regular weekly chronicle "Kroz Crna Gora" began, which in 1971 grew into the daily service "Novosti dana". A sports team was also set up around this time.

The first daily television news service (Dnevnik) was broadcast in 1975. In 1979, Titograd TV joined the Eurovision network at the opening of the TV Festival of non-aligned countries in Bar.

RTT moved into its new facilities in 1984, which improved professional working conditions.

In 1991, the channel adopted its current name, TVCG 1, gaining a more autonomous schedule in 1997. The channel was previously known under the name Televizija Titograd. As early as 1998, when RTCG began to distance itself from Slobodan Milošević's policies and the official stance coming from Belgrade, its television output began to increase.
