= Radio and Television of Montenegro =

Montenegrin public radio and TV broadcaster

Radio i Televizija Crne Gore
- Logos used since 2024
- Type: Radio and television
- Country: Montenegro
- Availability: National; International (via TVCG MNE and online)
- Headquarters: Podgorica
- Owner: Government of Montenegro
- Key people: Boris Raonić (General-Director); Veselin Drljević (President of the RTCG council)
- Launch date: 27 November 1949; 76 years ago (radio); 4 May 1964; 62 years ago (television)
- Former names: Radio-Televizija Titograd (RTT)
- Official website: www.rtcg.me
- Language: Montenegrin

Radio and Television of Montenegro (Note: Montenegrin: Радио и Телевизија Црне Горе, Radio i Televizija Crne Gore) (abbr. RTCG (Note: РТЦГ)) is the public service broadcaster of Montenegro. A state-owned company with its headquarters in Podgorica, it is made up of the Radio of Montenegro (Note: Montenegrin: Радио Црне Горе, Radio Crne Gore) (abbr. RCG (Note: РЦГ)) and the Television of Montenegro (Note: Montenegrin: Телевизија Црне Горе, Televizija Crne Gore) (abbr. TVCG (Note: ТВЦГ)).

In July 2001, RTCG became a joint member of the European Broadcasting Union (EBU). It became a full member of the EBU upon the declaration of Montenegrin independence in 2006.

== History ==
The first radio station in the Balkans and South-East Europe was established in Montenegro with the opening of a transmitter situated on the hill of Volujica near Bar by Knjaz Nikola I Petrović-Njegoš (1841–1921) on 3 August 1904. Radio Cetinje commenced broadcasts on 27 November 1944 and in 1949, Radio Titograd was formed. In 1990 it changed its name to Radio Crna Gora.

In 1957, the first TV antenna was placed on Mount Lovćen. It was able to receive pictures from Italy. RTV Titograd was established in 1963 to produce original television programmes. RTV Titograd later became RTCG. The first broadcast by TVCG in Belgrade was a news program in 1964.

Since October 2002, RTCG has been a member of the EGTA, European Group of Television Advertising.

RTCG announced a competition for a new logo in late 2023, which received 43 entries. The winner was supposed to be revealed on 27 November, but was postponed as the winning design was similar to the logo used by Google's OR-Tools. The new identity was officially unveiled on 2 April 2024, coinciding with the 60th anniversary of television in Montenegro.

Former logos and identities

1964

1989

1991 to 2005

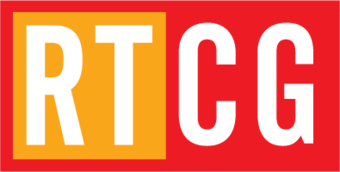
2005 to 2012

2012 to 2024

== Management ==
RTCG is regulated by the Law on Public Radio-Diffusion Services, requiring it to serve the interests of all Montenegro citizen, regardless of their political, religious, culture, racial or gender affiliation.

RTCG is managed by a Council of nine members, who are experts proposed by civil society organisations and appointed by the Parliament by simple majority. The RTCG Council appoints the Director General of the RTCG and advocates in the public interest. Although its nomination procedure should ensure the independence of the Council, the fact that some of the nominating organisations receive state funding has led the OSCE and the Council of Europe to express concern about their lack of independence from the government coalition.

RTCG is widely seen as dependent from the Government, particularly after allegedly politically motivated dismissals of journalists in 2011. RTCG does not pay a broadcasting licence fee and is financed directly from the State budget (1,2% of the budget) as well as from advertising revenues (for a limited airtime) and sales revenues. Its finances have been in trouble lately, and it edged bankruptcy in 2012, further endangering its independence credentials. RTCG's financial viability is often at risk and relies heavily on the government as its primary source of funding. RTCG's debt stock (€2.4 million) was covered by the state budget in 2014.

== Services ==
RTCG has four television channels: three terrestrial, one international; it also has two radio stations. RTCG also now provides four online radio channels (YUG, Millennium, Classic, Shqip) through the broadcaster's app and via the internet.

Television channels

- TVCG 1 – News and domestic production.
- TVCG 2 – Sport, entertainment.
- TVCG 3 – Live broadcasts from the Parliament of Montenegro and other government institutions.
- TVCG MNE, formerly known as TVCG Sat – RTCG's international channel via satellite.
Channel logos since 2024

TVCG 1

TVCG 2

TVCG 3

TVCG MNE

Radio stations

- Radio Crne Gore – generalist
- Radio 98 – youth-oriented
