= Serbia in the Eurovision Song Contest 2015 =

- Eurovision Song Contest 2015
- Participating broadcaster: Radio Television of Serbia (RTS)
- Country: Serbia
- Selection process: Odbrojavanje za Beč
- Selection date: 15 February 2015

Competing entry
- Song: "Beauty Never Lies"
- Artist: Bojana Stamenov
- Songwriters: Vladimir Graić; Charlie Mason

Placement
- Semi-final result: Qualified (9th, 63 points)
- Final result: 10th, 53 points

Participation chronology

Serbia was represented at the Eurovision Song Contest 2015 with the song "Beauty Never Lies" written by Vladimir Graić and Charlie Mason. The song was performed by Bojana Stamenov. The Serbian national broadcaster, Radio Television of Serbia (RTS) organised the national final Odbrojavanje za Beč in order to select the Serbian entry for the 2015 contest in Vienna, Austria. Vladimir Graić was selected to compose three songs for the national final which consisted of two shows on 14 and 15 February 2015. Two of the songs were performed by established artists, while one was performed by an undiscovered candidate selected through a scouting process. The second show resulted in "Ceo svet je moj" performed by Bojana Stamenov as the winner following the combination of votes from a three-member jury panel and a public televote. The song was later translated from Serbian to English for the Eurovision Song Contest and was titled "Beauty Never Lies".

Serbia was drawn to compete in the first semi-final of the Eurovision Song Contest which took place on 19 May 2015. Performing during the show in position 9, "Beauty Never Lies" was announced among the top 10 entries of the first semi-final and therefore qualified to compete in the final on 23 May. It was later revealed that Serbia placed ninth out of the 16 participating countries in the semi-final with 63 points. In the final, Serbia performed in position 8 and placed tenth out of the 27 participating countries, scoring 53 points.

== Background ==
Prior to the 2015 contest, Serbia had participated in the Eurovision Song Contest seven times since its first entry in 2007, winning the contest with their debut entry "Molitva" performed by Marija Šerifović. Between 2007 and 2009, Serbia used the Beovizija national final in order to select their entry. However, after their 2009 entry, "Cipela" performed by Marko Kon and Milaan, failed to qualify Serbia to the final, the broadcaster shifted their selection strategy to selecting specific composers to create songs for artists. In 2010, RTS selected Goran Bregović to compose songs for a national final featuring three artists, while in 2011 Kornelije Kovač, Aleksandra Kovač and Kristina Kovač were tasked with composing one song each. In 2012, the internal selection of Željko Joksimović and the song "Nije ljubav stvar" secured the country's second highest placing in the contest to this point, placing third. In 2013, RTS returned to an open national final format and organized the Beosong competition. The winning entry, "Ljubav je svuda" performed by Moje 3, failed to qualify Serbia to the final at the Eurovision Song Contest 2013.

The Serbian national broadcaster, Radio Television of Serbia (RTS), broadcasts the event within Serbia and organises the selection process for the nation's entry. On 22 November 2013, RTS announced that it would withdraw from the 2014 contest due to financial difficulties and a lack of available sponsorship for a potential Serbian entry. On 7 April 2014, head of press at RTS, Duška Vučinić, stated that RTS hope to send a representative in 2015 and continue Serbia's participation in the contest. On 15 September 2014, RTS announced that it had submitted a preliminary application to participate in the 2015 contest conditioned on the broadcaster's ability to account for any financial issues. On 26 September 2014, RTS fully confirmed their intentions to participate at the 2015 Eurovision Song Contest and announced details regarding their selection procedure for their entry.

== Before Eurovision ==
=== Odbrojavanje za Beč ===
Odbrojavanje za Beč (transl. Countdown for Vienna) was the national final organised by RTS in order to select the Serbian entry for the Eurovision Song Contest 2015. The selection consisted of two shows to be held on 14 and 15 February 2015, respectively, at the studios of RTS in Košutnjak, Belgrade. Both shows were broadcast on RTS1, RTS HD and RTS Sat as well as streamed online via the broadcaster's website rts.rs. The second show was also streamed online via the official Eurovision Song Contest website eurovision.tv.

==== Competing entries ====
RTS announced on 26 September 2014 that Vladimir Graić, the composer of Serbia's winning entry "Molitva" in 2007, would compose three songs for the national final. Two of the songs were performed by established artists Aleksa Jelić and Bojana Stamenov, while one was performed by an undiscovered candidate selected through a scouting process.

For the undiscovered candidate selection, Serb citizens were able to apply by submitting their personal details and a maximum-one-minute performance clip of a Serbian pop/rock song between 29 October 2014 and 10 November 2014. At the closing of the deadline, over 300 applications were received. Vladimir Graić screened the submissions and invited potential candidates to auditions that were held between 17 and 28 November 2014 in six Serbian cities – Niš, Zaječar, Kragujevac, Užice, Novi Sad and Belgrade. The judging panel during the auditions included Graić, Vukomanović, Aleksandar Kobac (composer) and Dragan Ilić (Serbian Head of Delegation for Eurovision). Following the auditions, 30 candidates were shortlisted for further consideration, of which ten were selected to compete in a live broadcast special of the RTS1 programme Nedeljno popodne which took place on 14 December 2014. Each candidate performed a well-known song together with a live band during the programme and the judging panel selected Danica Krstić and Goga Stanić to proceed to the national final. Following consultation with RTS, ultimately only Danica Krstić proceeded to the national final.

Undiscovered candidate selection – 14 December 2014
R/O	Artist	Song (Original artists)	Result
1	Milena Milivojević	"She Will Be Loved" (Maroon 5)	—N/a
2	~~Goga Stanić~~	~~"A i ti me iznevjeri" (Bijelo Dugme)~~	~~Selected~~
3	Marija Lazić	"Locked Out of Heaven" (Bruno Mars)	—N/a
4	Dragan and Željko Sarić	"Lagala nas mala" (Toše Proeski and Tony Cetinski)	—N/a
5	Milica Dejanović	"When Love Takes Over" (David Guetta feat. Kelly Rowland)	—N/a
6	Ivana Milojević	"Kao da me nema" (Vanna)	—N/a
7	Anastasija Knežević and Varja Topalović	"Stronger (What Doesn't Kill You)" (Kelly Clarkson)	—N/a
8	Jelena Milošev	"Čuvaj moje srce" (Aleksandra Radović)	—N/a
9	Petar Bošković and Nemanja Antonić	"Uptown Funk" (Mark Ronson feat. Bruno Mars)	—N/a
10	Danica Krstić	"Bol do ludila" (Marija Šerifović)	Selected

Competing entries
Artist	Song	Songwriters
Aleksa Jelić	"Vodi me" (Води ме)	Vladimir Graić; Leontina Vukomanović
Bojana Stamenov	"Ceo svet je moj" (Цео свет је мој)	Vladimir Graić; Leontina Vukomanović
Danica Krstić	"Suze za kraj" (Сузе за крај)	Vladimir Graić; Leontina Vukomanović

==== Final ====
The national final consisted of two shows. The first show, hosted by Dragana Kosjerina, took place on 14 February 2015 and was an introductory show where the three competing artists each performed two well-known songs — one local and one foreign — together with a live band. In addition to the individual performances, the artists together performed the song "Princeza" by Slađana Milošević and Dado Topić, and the running order of the second show was determined.

The second show, hosted by Maja Nikolić, took place on 15 February 2015 and featured the three artists performing their respective candidate Eurovision song. The winner, "Ceo svet je moj" performed by Bojana Stamenov, was decided by a combination of votes from a jury panel consisting of Nevena Božović (represented Serbia in 2013 as part of the group Moje 3), Goran Stankov (producer from the production company Beoton) and Ivan Ilić (composer, arranger, conductor), and the Serbian public via SMS voting. In addition to the competing entries, Andrea Demirović, who represented Montenegro in 2009, Moje 3, and the group Beauty Queens were featured as guest performers during the show.

Show 1 – 14 February 2014
R/O	Artist	Song 1 (Original artists)	R/O	Song 2 (Original artists)
1	Danica Krstić	"My Number One" (Helena Paparizou)	4	"Jutro" (Jelena Tomašević)
2	Aleksa Jelić	"Nije ljubav stvar" (Željko Joksimović)	5	"Fairytale" (Alexander Rybak)
3	Bojana Stamenov	"Baj, baj, baj" (Bisere Veletanlić)	6	"All About That Bass" (Meghan Trainor)

Show 2 – 15 February 2014
R/O	Artist	Song	Jury		Televote		Total	Place
R/O	Artist	Song	Votes	Points	Votes	Points	Total	Place
1	Aleksa Jelić	"Vodi me"	5	2	4,363	1	3	2
2	Danica Krstić	"Suze za kraj"	4	1	8,039	2	3	3
3	Bojana Stamenov	"Ceo svet je moj"	9	3	10,547	3	6	1

Detailed Jury Votes
R/O	Song	N. Božović	G. Stankov	I. Ilić	Total
1	"Vodi me"	2	2	1	5
2	"Suze za kraj"	1	1	2	4
3	"Ceo svet je moj"	3	3	3	9

=== Preparation ===
In early March 2015, RTS announced that an English version of "Ceo svet je moj" titled "Beauty Never Lies" would be produced with lyrics by Charlie Mason, who co-wrote the Eurovision Song Contest 2014 winning entry "Rise Like a Phoenix". Stamenov stated that she preferred to sing the English version at Eurovision, though no decision had been made in regards to the language. Graić also previously stated that he would prefer to compete with an English language song. On 9 March, "Beauty Never Lies" was released and shortly afterwards on 11 March, the Serbian delegation and OGAE Serbia issued an invitation for fans to submit videos of themselves singing the English version of the song by 13 March. On 16 March, the collage of video clips was released as the preview video for the Serbian entry and featured appearances by former Serbian Eurovision contestants Marija Šerifović, who won the contest in 2007, and Nina Radojčić, who represented Serbia in 2011. "Beauty Never Lies" marked the first time that Serbia sent an entry in a language other than Serbian.

Throughout April 2015, different language versions of the Serbian entry were released for promotional purposes: in Spanish under the title "El mundo bajo mis pies" with lyrics by Takis and Javier Gutiérrez Lozano, in French under the title "Le monde est à moi" with lyrics by Francis Soghomonian and a German yodeling version under the title "Die ganze Welt ist mein" with lyrics by Marko Nikolić. On 15 April, the official music video for "Beauty Never Lies" was released. The video was filmed in early April 2015 at the Dunđerski Castle in Kulpin.

== At Eurovision ==
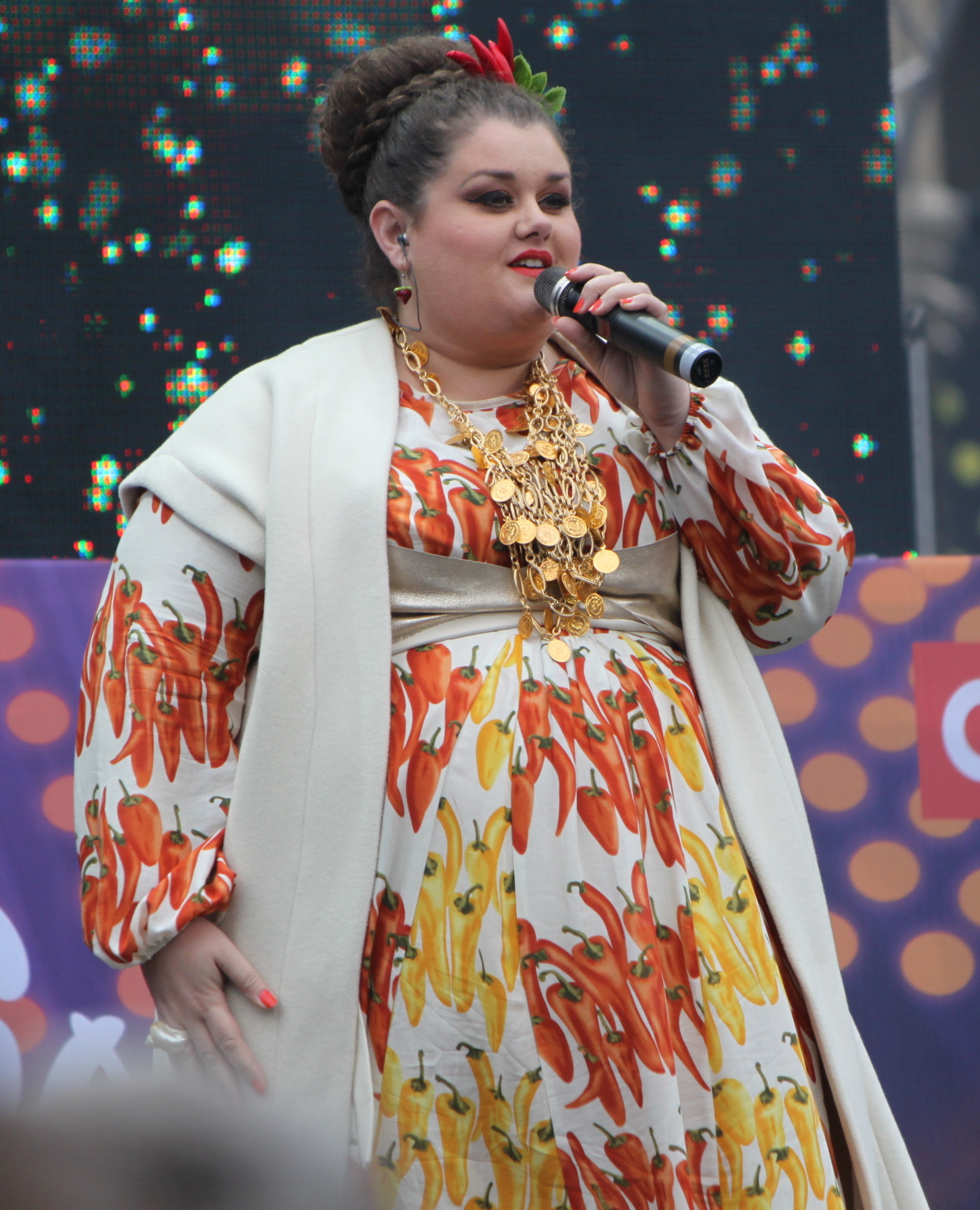
Bojana Stamenov performing at the Eurovision Village in Vienna

According to Eurovision rules, all nations with the exceptions of the host country and the "Big Five" (France, Germany, Italy, Spain and the United Kingdom) are required to qualify from one of two semi-finals in order to compete for the final; the top ten countries from each semi-final progress to the final. In the 2015 contest, Australia also competed directly in the final as an invited guest nation. The European Broadcasting Union (EBU) split up the competing countries into five different pots based on voting patterns from previous contests, with countries with favourable voting histories put into the same pot. On 26 January 2015, a special allocation draw was held which placed each country into one of the two semi-finals, as well as which half of the show they would perform in. Serbia was placed into the first semi-final, to be held on 19 May 2015, and was scheduled to perform in the second half of the show.

Once all the competing songs for the 2015 contest had been released, the running order for the semi-finals was decided by the shows' producers rather than through another draw, so that similar songs were not placed next to each other. Serbia was set to perform in position 9, following the entry from Macedonia and before the entry from Hungary.

The first semi-final and the final were broadcast in Serbia on RTS 1, RTS HD and RTS Sat with commentary by Duška Vučinić. The second semi-final was broadcast on RTS 2 and RTS Sat with commentary by Silvana Grujić. The Serbian spokesperson, who announced the Serbian votes during the final, was Maja Nikolić.

=== Semi-final ===
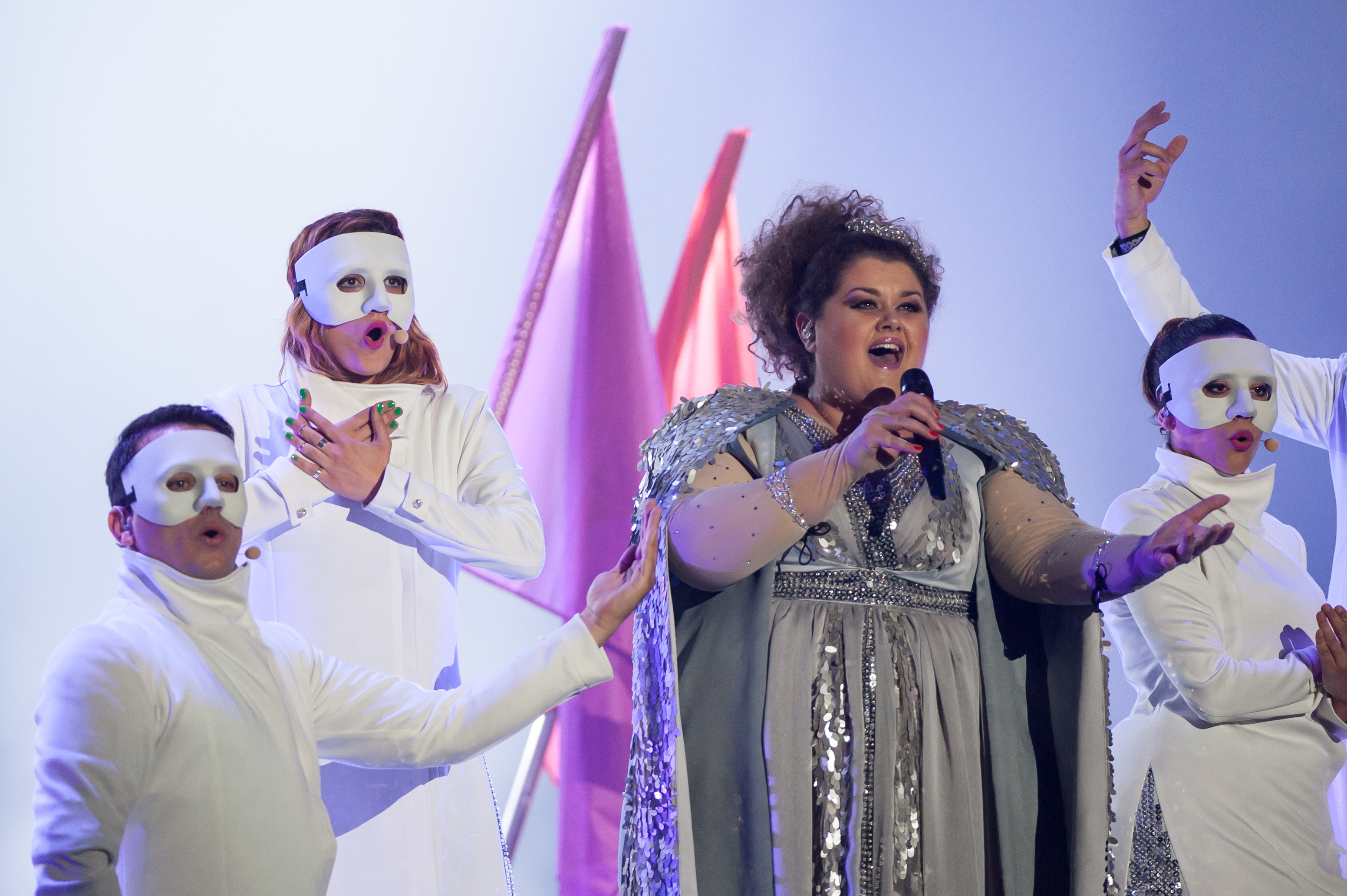
Bojana Stamenov during a rehearsal before the first semi-final

Bojana Stamenov took part in technical rehearsals on 12 and 15 May, followed by dress rehearsals on 18 and 19 May. This included the jury final where professional juries of each country, responsible for 50 percent of each country's vote, watched and voted on the competing entries.

The Serbian performance featured Bojana Stamenov in a silver dress with two female and two male backing vocalists dressed in long white coats and donning white masks. The staging for the song, directed by Gorčin Stojanović, began with white elements and lighting and the backing vocalists walking in the background holding coloured flags. As the song progressed, the stage displayed flashing blue and pink lights while the backing vocalists took their coats and masks off and danced. In regards to the staging, composer Vladimir Graić commented: "In the beginning, she feels heartbroken, but at some point she decided to set herself free. Masks are falling down and she is shining again". The four backing vocalists that joined Bojana on stage were Saška Janković, Sanja Bogosavljević, Oliver Katić and Marko Nikolić.

At the end of the show, Serbia was announced as having finished in the top ten and subsequently qualifying for the grand final. It was later revealed that Serbia placed ninth in the semi-final, receiving a total of 63 points.

=== Final ===
Shortly after the first semi-final, a winner's press conference was held for the ten qualifying countries. As part of this press conference, the qualifying artists took part in a draw to determine which half of the grand final they would subsequently participate in. This draw was done in the order the countries were announced during the semi-final. Serbia was drawn to compete in the first half. Following this draw, the shows' producers decided upon the running order of the final, as they had done for the semi-finals. Serbia was subsequently placed to perform in position 8, following the entry from Lithuania and before the entry from Norway.

Bojana once again took part in dress rehearsals on 22 and 23 May before the final, including the jury final where the professional juries cast their final votes before the live show. Stamenov performed a repeat of her semi-final performance during the final on 23 May. At the conclusion of the voting, Serbia finished in tenth place with 53 points.

=== Voting ===
Voting during the three shows consisted of 50 percent public televoting and 50 percent from a jury deliberation. The jury consisted of five music industry professionals who were citizens of the country they represent, with their names published before the contest to ensure transparency. This jury was asked to judge each contestant based on: vocal capacity; the stage performance; the song's composition and originality; and the overall impression by the act. In addition, no member of a national jury could be related in any way to any of the competing acts in such a way that they cannot vote impartially and independently. The individual rankings of each jury member were released shortly after the grand final.

Following the release of the full split voting by the EBU after the conclusion of the competition, it was revealed that Serbia had placed tenth with the public televote and twenty-fourth with the jury vote in the final. In the public vote, Serbia scored 86 points, while with the jury vote, Serbia scored 12 points. In the first semi-final, Serbia placed seventh with the public televote with 78 points and fourteenth with the jury vote, scoring 43 points.

Below is a breakdown of points awarded to Serbia and awarded by Serbia in the first semi-final and grand final of the contest, and the breakdown of the jury voting and televoting conducted during the two shows:

==== Points awarded to Serbia ====
Points awarded to Serbia (Semi-final 1)
Score	Country
12 points	Australia; Macedonia
10 points	
8 points	
7 points	Austria; Netherlands
6 points	
5 points	Armenia
4 points	Belarus; Finland; Hungary; Russia
3 points	
2 points	Greece
1 point	Denmark; France

Points awarded to Serbia (Final)
Score	Country
12 points	Montenegro
10 points	Macedonia
8 points	
7 points	
6 points	Slovenia
5 points	Australia; Switzerland
4 points	
3 points	Austria; Czech Republic; Italy
2 points	Albania; Israel
1 point	Netherlands; United Kingdom

==== Points awarded by Serbia ====
Points awarded by Serbia (Semi-final 1)
Score	Country
12 points	Macedonia
10 points	Russia
8 points	Hungary
7 points	Belgium
6 points	Greece
5 points	Moldova
4 points	Finland
3 points	Romania
2 points	Estonia
1 point	Georgia

Points awarded by Serbia (Final)
Score	Country
12 points	Montenegro
10 points	Russia
8 points	Sweden
7 points	Italy
6 points	Israel
5 points	Slovenia
4 points	Belgium
3 points	Australia
2 points	Estonia
1 point	Latvia

==== Detailed voting results ====
The following members comprised the Serbian jury:

- Dejan Cukić (jury chairperson) – singer, composer
- Marko Kon – singer, composer, represented Serbia in 2009
- Saša Milošević Mare – composer, winning songwriter of the 2007 contest
- Ksenija Milošević – master violinist
- Nevena Božović – singer, represented Serbia in the Junior Eurovision Song Contest 2007, in the 2013 contest as member of Moje 3 and later in the 2019 contest

Detailed voting results from Serbia (Semi-final 1)
R/O	Country	D. Cukić	M. Kon	S. Milošević Mare	K. Milošević	N. Božović	Jury Rank	Televote Rank	Combined Rank	Points
01	Moldova	2	1	3	2	1	2	11	6	5
02	Armenia	15	15	13	12	14	15	15	15	
03	Belgium	3	7	4	4	3	4	8	4	7
04	Netherlands	8	6	5	6	4	6	14	11	
05	Finland	11	8	6	14	13	10	6	7	4
06	Greece	12	10	10	9	9	9	4	5	6
07	Estonia	9	14	14	15	10	13	5	9	2
08	Macedonia	1	2	1	1	2	1	1	1	12
09	Serbia									
10	Hungary	4	5	7	5	7	5	3	3	8
11	Belarus	14	13	12	10	11	12	12	14	
12	Russia	5	4	2	3	5	3	2	2	10
13	Denmark	6	9	8	7	8	8	13	12	
14	Albania	10	11	15	13	15	14	9	13	
15	Romania	7	3	9	8	6	7	10	8	3
16	Georgia	13	12	11	11	12	11	7	10	1

Detailed voting results from Serbia (Final)
R/O	Country	D. Cukić	M. Kon	S. Milošević Mare	K. Milošević	N. Božović	Jury Rank	Televote Rank	Combined Rank	Points
01	Slovenia	2	8	6	2	12	6	7	6	5
02	France	15	11	12	22	14	13	23	18	
03	Israel	12	1	7	3	8	7	5	5	6
04	Estonia	9	17	16	26	5	12	9	9	2
05	United Kingdom	16	19	25	23	22	24	20	24	
06	Armenia	26	24	26	24	25	26	26	26	
07	Lithuania	17	25	20	21	19	23	19	21	
08	Serbia									
09	Norway	20	23	14	25	16	21	21	22	
10	Sweden	6	4	4	5	3	3	4	3	8
11	Cyprus	13	16	17	14	23	16	22	20	
12	Australia	4	3	3	9	7	4	11	8	3
13	Belgium	3	7	8	7	2	5	8	7	4
14	Austria	14	22	15	19	15	18	24	23	
15	Greece	23	20	21	16	17	20	15	17	
16	Montenegro	1	2	1	1	1	1	1	1	12
17	Germany	7	10	9	11	10	9	16	12	
18	Poland	19	15	18	20	24	19	18	19	
19	Latvia	11	6	11	12	9	10	13	10	1
20	Romania	18	9	10	13	13	11	17	14	
21	Spain	21	14	13	17	18	17	14	16	
22	Hungary	8	21	19	8	20	14	10	11	
23	Georgia	22	12	22	10	11	15	12	13	
24	Azerbaijan	24	18	24	15	21	22	25	25	
25	Russia	5	5	2	4	4	2	2	2	10
26	Albania	25	26	23	18	26	25	6	15	
27	Italy	10	13	5	6	6	8	3	4	7
