= Marija Šerifović discography =

Marija Šerifović Serbia discography
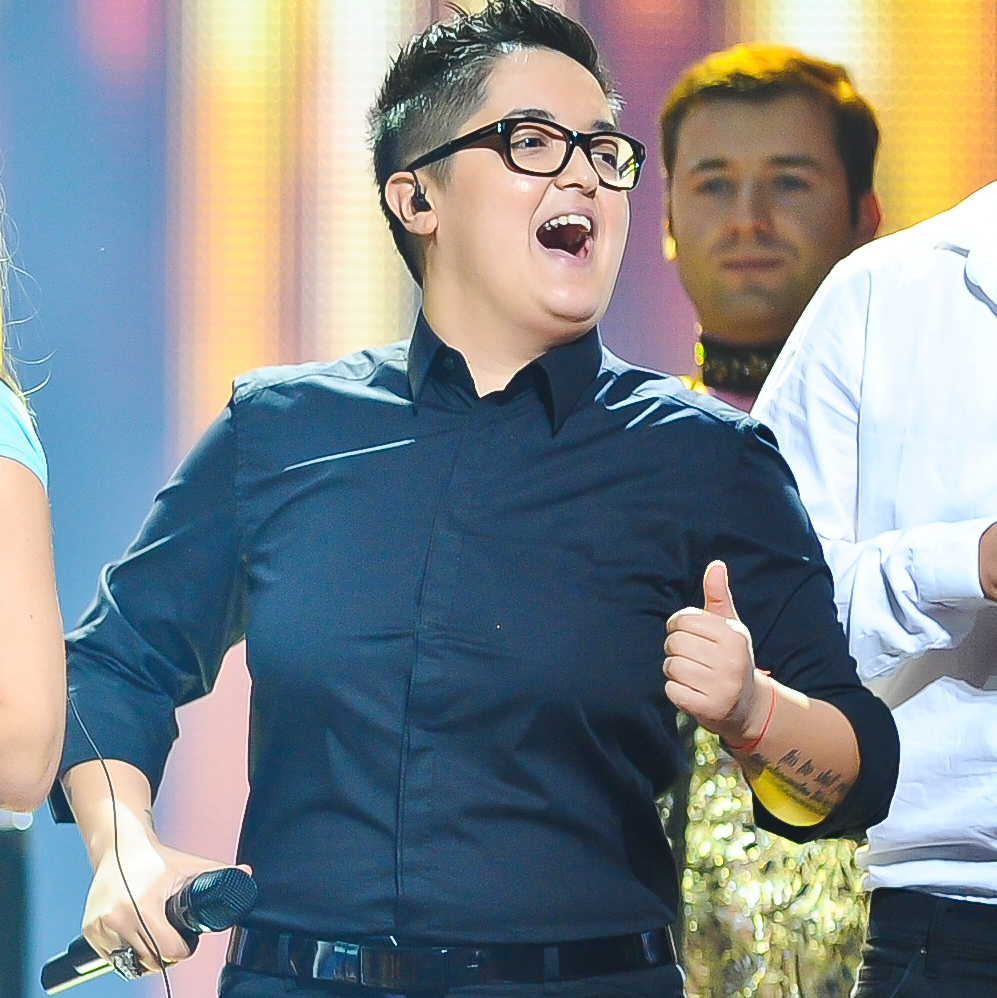
- Šerifović performing in 2012
- Studio albums: 6
- Singles: 15
- Video albums: 1
- Music videos: 8

This page includes the discography of the Serbian artist Marija Šerifović.

== Albums ==
=== Studio albums ===
Title	Album
Naj, Najbolja	Released: 2003; Languages: Serbian; Label: City Records
Bez Ljubavi	Released: 2006; Languages: Serbian; Label: City Records
Nisam Anđeo	Released: 2008; Languages: Serbian; Label: City Records
Anđeo	Released: 2009; Languages: Serbian, English; Label: City Records
Hrabro	Released: 2014; Languages: Serbian; Label: City Records
Dolazi Ljubav	Released: 2023; Languages: Serbian; Label: Panda Records

=== Compilation albums ===
Title	Album
Molitva - The Best Of	Released: 2007; Languages: Serbian; Label: City Records
The Best Of	Released: 2020; Languages: Serbian; Label: Dallas Records

== Singles ==
Year	Title	Peak chart positions				Album
Year	Title	BEL (FLA)	SWE	SWI	UK	Album
2003	"Znaj da znam"	—	—	—	—	Naj, Najbolja
2003	"Naj, najbolja"	—	—	—	—	Naj, Najbolja
2003	"Gorka čokolada"	—	—	—	—	Bez Ljubavi
2004	"Bol do ludila"	—	—	—	—	Bez Ljubavi
2005	"Ponuda"	—	—	—	—	Ponuda CDS
2005	"Agonija"	—	—	—	—	Agonija CDS
2005	"U nedelju"	—	—	—	—	Bez Ljubavi
2006	"Bez ljubavi"	—	—	—	—	Bez Ljubavi
2006	"101"	—	—	—	—	Bez Ljubavi
2007	"Molitva"	4	9	19	112	Molitva CDS, Molitva – The Best Of
2008	"Nisam Anđeo"	—	—	—	—	Nisam Anđeo
2009	"Šta da zaboravim"	—	—	—	—	Anđeo
2010	"Jedan vidi sve"	—	—	—	—	Anđeo
2014	"Ja volim svoj greh"	—	—	—	—	Hrabro
2014	"Mrš"	—	—	—	—	Hrabro
2015	"Pametna i luda"	—	—	—	—	11
2015	"Sama i nervozna"	—	—	—	—	11
2016	"Svoja i tvoja"	—	—	—	—	11
2016	"Deo prošlosti"	—	—	—	—	11
2017	"11"	—	—	—	—	11
2018	"Nije ljubav to"	—	—	—	—	11
"—" denotes release that did not chart or was not released

== Music videos ==
Year	Title
2003	"Znaj da znam"
2004	"Bol do ludila"
2005	"U nedelju"
2007	"Molitva"
2009	"Sta da zaboravim"
2010	"Jedan vidi sve"
2014	"Ja volim svoj greh"
2014	"Mrš"
2015	"Pametna i luda"
2015	"Sama i nervozna"
2016	"Svoja i tvoja"
2016	"Deo prošlosti"
2017	"11"
2018	"Nije ljubav to"
