= I'm Not an Angel =

I'm Not an Angel or I'm Not An Angel may refer to:

- "I'm Not an Angel", a song by Halestorm on their album Halestorm
- "I'm Not An Angel", a song by Kimmie Rhodes
- "I'm Not an Angel", a song by Ra
- Nisam Anđeo, (I'm Not an Angel), album by Marija Šerifović.
- Tenshi Nanka Ja Nai, (I'm Not an Angel), manga by Ai Yazawa
- "Cheonsaga Anya", (천사가 아냐, "I'm Not an Angel"), a song by APink on their EP Pink Luv

== See also ==
- I'm No Angel (disambiguation)
- No Angel (disambiguation)
- Not an Angel
