= Ludo srce (Katarina Živković album) =

Studio album by Katarina Živković
- Released: 13 April 2013
- Recorded: 2011–13: Belgrade; Kraljevo
- Genre: dance; dance-pop
- Label: Grand Production
- Producer: Pavle Radulović; Goran Radinović; Aleksandar Sofronijević; Alek Aleksov; Srđan Moby Dick; Dorijan Šetina; Damir Handanović

Katarina Živković chronology
Ludo srce (2013)	Porok (2017)

Singles from Ludo srce
- 1. "Da mi je" Released: 11 October 2012; 2. "Ludo srce" Released: 6 April 2013; 3. "Ruku na srce" Released: 11 April 2013; 4. "Noćno ludilo" Released: 23 April 2013

Ludo srce (Serbian Cyrillic: Лудо срце, lit. 'Crazy Heart') is the debut studio album by Serbian pop star Katarina Živković. It was released 13 April 2013 through Grand Production.

Over 13 years after its release, the album's lead single "Da mi je" debuted on Billboard's Croatia Songs chart at number 16 in the week of 10 January 2026. It peaked at number nine in the week of 7 February 2026.

== Track listing ==
No.	Title	Writer(s)	Producer(s)	Length
1.	"Ludo srce" (Crazy Heart ft. DJ Buka & Sha)	Gordana Gvozdenović; Igor Milićević	Pavle Radulović	3:15
2.	"Da mi je" (I Want To)	Goran Radinović; Dejan Kostić	Goran Radinović	3:28
3.	"Nikad drugog, nikad drugom" (Never Another, Never to Another)	Nenad Konstantin; Goran Radinović	Goran Radinović	4:00
4.	"Noćno ludilo" (Night Madness)	Milan Radulović; Goran Radinović	Goran Radinović	3:50
5.	"Ruku na srce" (Hand on Heart)	Gordana Gvozdenović; Kosana Stojić; Igor Milićević	Pavle Radulović	3:23
6.	"Bez ljubavi nisam živa" (Without Love I'm Not Alive)	Pavle Dejanić; Dejan Kostić	Goran Radinović	3:10
7.	"Hej lepi đavole" (Hey Pretty Devil)	Gordana Gvozdenović; Igor Milićević	Pavle Radulović	3:25
8.	"Ako se rastanemo jednom" (If We Ever Separate)	Saša Milošević; Zoran Marjanović	Aleksandar Sofronijević	3:15

Bonus tracks
No.	Title	Writer(s)	Producer(s)	Length
9.	"Devet meseci" (Nine Months)	Miloš Vuksanović	Alek Aleksov	3:45
10.	"Kad te ne volim" (When I Don't Love You)	Bane Opačić	Dorijan Šetina	3:12
11.	"Ljubav" (Love)	Biljana Spasić; Damir Handanović	Damir Handanović	3:16
12.	"Slaži me još jednom" (Lie to Me Once More)	Rade Davidović Arindy; Marko Drežnjak	Srđan Moby Dick	3:46

== Personnel ==
=== Instruments ===
- Aleksandar Sofronijević – accordion (8)
- Goran Radinović – accordion, keyboards (6)
- Dejan Kostić – backing vocals (7)
- Ivana Selakov – backing vocals (7)
- Ksenija Milošević – backing vocals (6)
- Mirjana Aleksić – backing vocals (8)
- Nemanja Mijatović – violin (8)

=== Production and recording ===
- Ivan Lekić – engineering (8)
- Vladimir Aleksić – guitar, bouzouki, bass (6)
- Goran Radinović – programming (6)

=== Crew ===
- Dragan ŠuhART – design
- Vanja Pantin – styling
- Dejan Milićević – photography
