= Verica (disambiguation) =

Verica was a British client king of the Roman Empire.

Verica may also refer to:

== Given name ==
- Verica Nedeljković (born 1929), Serbian chess player
- Verica Rakočević (born 1948), Serbian clothing designer
- Verica Kalanović (born 1954), Serbian politician
- Verica Trstenjak (born 1962), Slovenian lawyer and judge
- Verica Šerifović (born 1963), Serbian singer
- Verica Bakoc (born 1999), Canadian water polo player

== Surname ==
- Marc Verica (born 1988), American footballer
- Tom Verica (born 1964), American actor and television director
