= Dinić =

Dinić is a Serbian surname. It may refer to:

- Vladan Dinić (born 1949), Serbian journalist, TV-host and editor-in-chief
- Suzana Dinić (born 1986), Serbian singer and pianist
- Ivan Dinić (born 1971), Serbian artist, designer
- Mihailo Dinić (1899—1970), Serbian historian and member of the Serbian Academy of Science and Arts
