= Ana Milenković =

Serbian singer (born 1980)

- Birth name: Ana Milenković
- Born: 19 April 1980 (age 44); Belgrade, Serbia, former SFR Yugoslavia
- Genres: Pop
- Occupation: Singer
- Years active: 2000–present
- Labels: City Records (2007–)
- Website: Ana Milenković Official

Ana Milenković (Serbian Cyrillic: Ана Миленковић, born 19 April 1980 in Belgrade, Serbia, former SFR Yugoslavia) is a Serbian singer. She was a member of the girlband Beauty Queens, which was formed by gathering backing vocalists of Marija Šerifović after victory in the Eurovision Song Contest 2007.

== Before Beauty Queens ==
Milenković appeared as a soloist at many festivals – Belgrade Spring (2000), Budva Festival (2001), Eurosong (2004) and Zrenjanin Festival (2004). In 2005, she joined the Blah Blah Band. They successfully participated in the Beovizija 2006 and 2007. In 2006, the band won the best newcomer award. She has worked with prominent musicians from Serbia and Montenegro. She did vocal back-up for the big pop star Zdravko Čolić and a very popular singer Vlado Georgiev.

== Beauty Queens ==
See Beauty Queens.

== Discography ==
=== Blah Blah Band ===
==== Singles ====
- 2006: "Maler"
- 2007: "Rulet"

=== Beauty Queens ===
==== Albums ====
- 2008: TBA

==== Singles ====
- 2004: "Takva žena"
- 2004: "Sad vraćam sve"
- 2007: "Pet na jedan"
- 2007: "Protiv srca"
- 2008: "Zavet"
- 2010: "Bez tebe"
- 2012: "Da se ljubimo"

==== Solo albums ====
- 2010: "Od sna do jave"
