= Serbia in the Eurovision Song Contest 2007 =

- Eurovision Song Contest 2007
- Participating broadcaster: Radio-televizija Srbije (RTS)
- Country: Serbia
- Selection process: Beovizija 2007
- Selection date: 8 March 2007

Competing entry
- Song: "Molitva"
- Artist: Marija Šerifović
- Songwriters: Saša Milošević Mare; Vladimir Graić

Placement
- Semi-final result: Qualified (1st, 298 points)
- Final result: 1st, 268 points

Participation chronology

Serbia was represented at the Eurovision Song Contest 2007 with the song "Molitva", composed by Vladimir Graić, with lyrics by Saša Milošević Mare, and performed by Marija Šerifović. The Serbian participating broadcaster, Radio-televizija Srbije (RTS), organised the national final Beovizija 2007 in order to select its entry for the contest. This was the first-ever entry from independent Serbia in the Eurovision Song Contest.

The national final consisted of two shows: a semi-final and a final on 7 and 8 March 2007, respectively. Twenty entries competed in the semi-final where the top ten qualified to the final following the combination of votes from a three-member jury panel and a public televote. The ten qualifiers competed in the final which resulted in "Molitva" performed by Marija Šerifović as the winner following the combination of votes from a three-member jury panel and a public televote.

Serbia competed in the semi-final of the Eurovision Song Contest which took place on 10 May 2007. Performing during the show in position 15, "Molitva" was announced among the top 10 entries of the semi-final and therefore qualified to compete in the final on 12 May. It was later revealed that Serbia placed first out of the 28 participating countries in the semi-final with 298 points. In the final, Serbia performed in position 17 and placed first out of the 24 participating countries, winning the contest and scoring 268 points. This was Serbia's first win in the Eurovision Song Contest.

== Background ==
On 28 December 2006, the Serbian national broadcaster, Radio-televizija Srbije (RTS), confirmed its intentions to debut at the Eurovision Song Contest in its 2007 edition representing Serbia as an independent country following the dissolution of the State Union of Serbia and Montenegro. Entries from Serbia had previously participated in the Eurovision Song Contest from 1961 to 1992 as part of Yugoslavia. Since 2004, RTS had used the Beovizija national final in order to select its entries for the Serbian-Montenegrin national final Evropesma/Europjesma and along with its participation confirmation, the broadcaster announced the organization of Beovizija 2007 in order to select its entry for the 2007 contest.

== Before Eurovision ==
=== Beovizija 2007 ===
Beovizija 2007 was the fifth edition of the Beovizija national final organised by RTS in order to select the Serbian entry for the Eurovision Song Contest 2007. The selection consisted of a semi-final featuring twenty songs and a final featuring ten songs to be held on 7 and 8 March 2007, respectively, at the Sava Centar in Belgrade. Both shows were hosted by Jelena Jovičić and Boda Ninković. The two shows were broadcast on RTS 1, RTS Sat, in Bosnia and Herzegovina on RTRS, via radio on Radio Belgrade as well as streamed online via the broadcaster's website rts.co.yu.

==== Competing entries ====
Artists and songwriters were able to submit their entries between 28 December 2006 and 29 January 2007. Artists were required to be Serb citizens and submit entries in Serbian, while songwriters of any nationality were allowed to submit songs. At the closing of the deadline, 200 submissions were received. A selection committee reviewed the submissions and selected twenty entries to proceed to the national final. The selection committee consisted of RTS music editors Anja Rogljić, Ana Miličević, Zoran Dašić, Jelena Ilić, Nikola Dojčinović, Miki Stanojević and Bilja Krstić. The selected competing entries were announced on 7 February 2007.

| Artist | Song | Songwriter(s) |
|---|---|---|
| Aleksa Jelić | "Beli grad" (Бели град) | Valentina Velkov, Dragi Jelić |
| Aleksandra Perović | "Noćas budi moj" (Ноћас буди мој) | Dragiša Baša |
| Amadeus Band | "Zato što znam" (Зато што знам) | Aleksandar Simić |
| Betty Boop | "Sama" (Сама) | Staniša Banjanin, Ognjen Cvekić |
| Blah Blah Band | "Ruski rulet" (Руски рулет) | Miloš Roganović, Bojan Vasić |
| Blizanci | "Mambo Jambo Serbiano" (Мамбо џамбо србијано) | Marina Tucaković, Nenad Jovanović |
| Igor Vukojević | "Dobro te znam" (Добро те знам) | Leontina Vukomanović, Srđan Simić Kamba |
| Ivana Jordan | "Bomba" (Бомба) | Ivana Jordan, Zvonko Alašević |
| IQ | "Ljubav za sve" (Љубав за све) | Nikola Demonja Jr., Aleksandar Sedlar Bogoev |
| Jelena Kovačević | "Senjorita" (Сењорита) | Jelena Kovačević, Vladimir Graić |
| Maja Marković | "Nije nam se dalo" (Није нам се дало) | Dragan Brajović, Miša Mijatović |
| Maja Nikolić | "Ja znam da ti me ne voliš" (Ја знам да ти ме не волиш) | Marko Đurašević, Rastko Savić |
| Marija Šerifović | "Molitva" (Молитва) | Saša Milošević Mare, Vladimir Graić |
| Miki Perić | "Jablan" (Јаблан) | Đorđe Radivojević, Zoran Lesendrić |
| Mira Škorić | "Voli je" (Воли је) | Marina Tucaković, Aleksandar Futa Radulović |
| Negative | "Prava stvar" (Права ствар) | Ivana Peters, Negative, Milan Prokop |
| Peca Jovanović | "Kao da je bilo juče" (Као да је било јуче) | Snežana Vukićević, Saša Dragić |
| Slobodan Trkulja and Balkanopolis | "Nebo" (Небо) | Slobodan Trkulja |
| Suzana Dinić | "Nudim ti srce svoje" (Нудим ти срце своје) | Jelena Trifunović, Dragomir Trifunović |
| Tanja Savić and Bane Mojićević | "Simpatija" (Симпатија) | Marina Tucaković, Bojan Vasić |

==== Semi-final ====
The semi-final took place on 7 March 2007 where twenty songs competed. The ten qualifiers for the final were decided by a combination of votes from a jury panel consisting of Branimir Dimitrijević (television director), Aleksandar Lokner (composer) and Maja Japundža-Nikolić (television host), and the Serbian public via SMS voting. The duo Flamingosi were featured as the guest performer during the show.

Semi-final – 7 March 2007
| R/O | Artist | Song | Jury | | Televote | | Total | Place |
| R/O | Artist | Song | Votes | Points | Votes | Points | Total | Place |
|---|---|---|---|---|---|---|---|---|
| 1 | Aleksandra Perović | "Noćas budi moj" | 0 | 0 | 204 | 0 | 0 | 14 |
| 2 | Maja Marković | "Nije nam se dalo" | 18 | 8 | 459 | 4 | 12 | 4 |
| 3 | Negative | "Prava stvar" | 10 | 2 | 427 | 3 | 5 | 10 |
| 4 | Marija Šerifović | "Molitva" | 26 | 12 | 2,063 | 12 | 24 | 1 |
| 5 | Tanja Savić and Bane Mojićević | "Simpatija" | 0 | 0 | 421 | 2 | 2 | 12 |
| 6 | Ivana Jordan | "Bomba" | 26 | 10 | 640 | 5 | 15 | 3 |
| 7 | Jelena Kovačević | "Senjorita" | 0 | 0 | 166 | 0 | 0 | 14 |
| 8 | Aleksa Jelić | "Beli grad" | 12 | 4 | 314 | 1 | 5 | 9 |
| 9 | Igor Vukojević | "Dobro te znam" | 0 | 0 | 29 | 0 | 0 | 14 |
| 10 | Amadeus Band | "Zato što znam" | 0 | 0 | 284 | 0 | 0 | 14 |
| 11 | Blah Blah Band | "Ruski rulet" | 0 | 0 | 166 | 0 | 0 | 14 |
| 12 | Blizanci | "Mambo Jambo Serbiano" | 1 | 0 | 1,388 | 8 | 8 | 6 |
| 13 | Miki Perić | "Jablan" | 14 | 6 | 283 | 0 | 6 | 8 |
| 14 | Maja Nikolić | "Ja znam da ti me ne voliš" | 6 | 0 | 301 | 0 | 0 | 14 |
| 15 | Mira Škorić | "Voli je" | 12 | 3 | 204 | 0 | 3 | 11 |
| 16 | Suzana Dinić | "Nudim ti srce svoje" | 10 | 1 | 297 | 0 | 1 | 13 |
| 17 | Slobodan Trkulja and Balkanopolis | "Nebo" | 16 | 7 | 1,936 | 10 | 17 | 2 |
| 18 | Peca Jovanović | "Kao da je bilo juče" | 13 | 5 | 728 | 6 | 11 | 5 |
| 19 | Betty Boop | "Sama" | 6 | 0 | 922 | 7 | 7 | 7 |
| 20 | IQ | "Ljubav za sve" | 4 | 0 | 279 | 0 | 0 | 14 |

Detailed Jury Votes
| R/O | Song | B. Dimitrijević | A. Lokner | M. Japundža-Nikolić | Total |
|---|---|---|---|---|---|
| 1 | "Noćas budi moj" | | | | 0 |
| 2 | "Nije nam se dalo" | 5 | 7 | 6 | 18 |
| 3 | "Prava stvar" | | | 10 | 10 |
| 4 | "Molitva" | 4 | 10 | 12 | 26 |
| 5 | "Simpatija" | | | | 0 |
| 6 | "Bomba" | 6 | 12 | 8 | 26 |
| 7 | "Senjorita" | | | | 0 |
| 8 | "Beli grad" | | 8 | 4 | 12 |
| 9 | "Dobro te znam" | | | | 0 |
| 10 | "Zato što znam" | | | | 0 |
| 11 | "Ruski rulet" | | | | 0 |
| 12 | "Mambo Jambo Serbiano" | | 1 | | 1 |
| 13 | "Jablan" | 7 | | 7 | 14 |
| 14 | "Ja znam da ti me ne voliš" | 3 | | 3 | 6 |
| 15 | "Voli je" | 1 | 6 | 5 | 12 |
| 16 | "Nudim ti srce svoje" | 10 | | | 10 |
| 17 | "Nebo" | 12 | 4 | | 16 |
| 18 | "Kao da je bilo juče" | 8 | 5 | | 13 |
| 19 | "Sama" | 2 | 2 | 2 | 6 |
| 20 | "Ljubav za sve" | | 3 | 1 | 4 |

==== Final ====
The final took place on 8 March 2007 and featured the ten qualifiers from the preceding semi-final. The winner, "Molitva" performed by Marija Šerifović, was decided by a combination of votes from a jury panel consisting of Sandra Šuša (RTS entertainment editor-in-chief), Zafir Hadžimanov (singer-songwriter and actor) and Dragana Šarić (represented Yugoslavia in the Eurovision Song Contest 1991 as Bebi Dol), and the Serbian public via SMS voting. Eurovision contestants Marija Šestić, Dado Topić and Dragonfly, Karolina Gočeva, Stevan Faddy and Alenka Gotar, who would represent Bosnia and Herzegovina, Croatia, Macedonia, Montenegro and Slovenia in 2007, respectively, singer Bilja Krstić, and the band Zana were featured as guest performers during the show.

Final – 8 March 2007
| R/O | Artist | Song | Jury | | Televote | | Total | Place |
| R/O | Artist | Song | Votes | Points | Votes | Points | Total | Place |
|---|---|---|---|---|---|---|---|---|
| 1 | Peca Jovanović | "Kao da je bilo juče" | 6 | 2 | 1,264 | 4 | 6 | 10 |
| 2 | Miki Perić | "Jablan" | 19 | 6 | 653 | 1 | 7 | 8 |
| 3 | Negative | "Prava stvar" | 27 | 12 | 1,128 | 3 | 15 | 3 |
| 4 | Betty Boop | "Sama" | 19 | 5 | 2,164 | 6 | 11 | 5 |
| 5 | Slobodan Trkulja and Balkanopolis | "Nebo" | 22 | 7 | 4,084 | 10 | 17 | 2 |
| 6 | Marija Šerifović | "Molitva" | 23 | 10 | 5,638 | 12 | 22 | 1 |
| 7 | Maja Marković | "Nije nam se dalo" | 18 | 4 | 1,000 | 2 | 6 | 9 |
| 8 | Blizanci | "Mambo Jambo Serbiano" | 3 | 1 | 3,377 | 8 | 9 | 6 |
| 9 | Ivana Jordan | "Bomba" | 23 | 8 | 2,792 | 7 | 15 | 4 |
| 10 | Aleksa Jelić | "Beli grad" | 14 | 3 | 1,585 | 5 | 8 | 7 |

Detailed Jury Votes
| R/O | Song | S. Šuša | Z. Hadžimanov | D. Šarić | Total |
|---|---|---|---|---|---|
| 1 | "Kao da je bilo juče" | 2 | 2 | 2 | 6 |
| 2 | "Jablan" | 10 | 6 | 3 | 19 |
| 3 | "Prava stvar" | 12 | 3 | 12 | 27 |
| 4 | "Sama" | 3 | 8 | 8 | 19 |
| 5 | "Nebo" | 5 | 7 | 10 | 22 |
| 6 | "Molitva" | 7 | 12 | 4 | 23 |
| 7 | "Nije nam se dalo" | 8 | 5 | 5 | 18 |
| 8 | "Mambo Jambo Serbiano" | 1 | 1 | 1 | 3 |
| 9 | "Bomba" | 6 | 10 | 7 | 23 |
| 10 | "Beli grad" | 4 | 4 | 6 | 14 |

==== Televoting results ====
The points from the televoting that were announced during the broadcast were based on 1,788 votes in the semi-final and 171 in the final. The company Fondlier, hired by RTS to process text messages for the shows, stated that their servers were "clogged up" due to a high volume of messages. The tables below showcase the results after all the votes were processed, and these numbers were used to determine the results of the shows.

Complete and incomplete televoting points in the semi-final
| R/O | Artist(s) | Song | Complete televoting | | Incomplete televoting | |
| R/O | Artist(s) | Song | Votes | Points | Votes | Points |
|---|---|---|---|---|---|---|
| 1 | Aleksandra Perović | "Noćas budi moj" | 204 | 0 | 57 | 0 |
| 2 | Maja Marković | "Nije nam se dalo" | 459 | 4 | 147 | 7 |
| 3 | Negative | "Prava stvar" | 427 | 3 | 99 | 4 |
| 4 | Marija Šerifović | "Molitva" | 2,063 | 12 | 400 | 12 |
| 5 | Tanja Savić and Bane Mojićević | "Simpatija" | 421 | 2 | 62 | 2 |
| 6 | Ivana Jordan | "Bomba" | 640 | 5 | 31 | 0 |
| 7 | Jelena Kovačević | "Senjorita" | 166 | 0 | 22 | 0 |
| 8 | Aleksa Jelić | "Beli grad" | 314 | 1 | 40 | 0 |
| 9 | Igor Vukojević | "Dobro te znam" | 29 | 0 | 5 | 0 |
| 10 | Amadeus band | "Zato što znam" | 284 | 0 | 47 | 0 |
| 11 | Bla bla band | "Ruski rulet” | 166 | 0 | 37 | 0 |
| 12 | Blizanci | "Mambo Jambo Serbiano" | 1388 | 8 | 115 | 5 |
| 13 | Miki Perić | "Jablan” | 283 | 0 | 35 | 0 |
| 14 | Maja Nikolić | "Ja znam da ti me ne voliš" | 301 | 0 | 33 | 0 |
| 15 | Mira Škorić | "Voli je" | 204 | 0 | 45 | 0 |
| 16 | Suzana Dinić | "Nudim ti srce svoje" | 297 | 0 | 67 | 3 |
| 17 | Slobodan Trkulja & Balkanopolis | "Nebo" | 1,936 | 10 | 195 | 10 |
| 18 | Peca Jovanović | "Kao da je bilo juče" | 728 | 6 | 121 | 6 |
| 19 | Betty Boop | "Sama" | 922 | 7 | 169 | 8 |
| 20 | IQ | "Ljubav za sve" | 279 | 0 | 61 | 1 |

Complete and incomplete televoting points in the final
| R/O | Artist(s) | Song | Complete televoting | | Incomplete televoting | |
| R/O | Artist(s) | Song | Votes | Points | Votes | Points |
|---|---|---|---|---|---|---|
| 1 | Peca Jovanović | "Kao da je bilo juče" | 1,264 | 4 | 10 | 4 |
| 2 | Miki Perić | "Jablan" | 653 | 1 | 5 (3) (Note: In case of a tie, the number of televotes received at the 10 minute voting mark is used to break it. The brackets show the number of votes received at that mark.) | 2 |
| 3 | Negative | "Prava stvar" | 1,128 | 3 | 5 (4) | 3 |
| 4 | Betty Boop | "Sama" | 2,164 | 6 | 15 | 6 |
| 5 | Slobodan Trkulja & Balkanopolis | "Nebo” | 4,084 | 10 | 27 | 10 |
| 6 | Marija Šerifović | "Molitva" | 5,638 | 12 | 50 | 12 |
| 7 | Maja Marković | "Nije nam se dalo" | 1,000 | 2 | 4 | 1 |
| 8 | Blizanci | "Mambo Jambo Serbiano" | 3,377 | 8 | 22 (16) | 8 |
| 9 | Ivana Jordan | "Bomba" | 2,792 | 7 | 11 | 5 |
| 10 | Aleksa Jelić | "Beli grad” | 1,585 | 5 | 22 (14) | 7 |

== At Eurovision ==
According to Eurovision rules, all nations with the exceptions of the host country, the "Big Four" (France, Germany, Spain and the United Kingdom) and the ten highest placed finishers in the 2006 are required to qualify from the semi-final on 10 May 2007 in order to compete for the final on 12 May 2007; the top ten countries from the semi-final progress to the final. On 12 March 2007, a special allocation draw was held which determined the running order for the semi-final and Serbia was set to perform in position 15, following the entry from Poland and before the entry from Czech Republic.

The semi-final and the final were broadcast in Serbia on RTS 1 and RTS Sat with commentary by Duška Vučinić-Lučić. RTS appointed Maja Japundža-Nikolić as its spokesperson to announce the Serbian votes during the final.

=== Semi-final ===
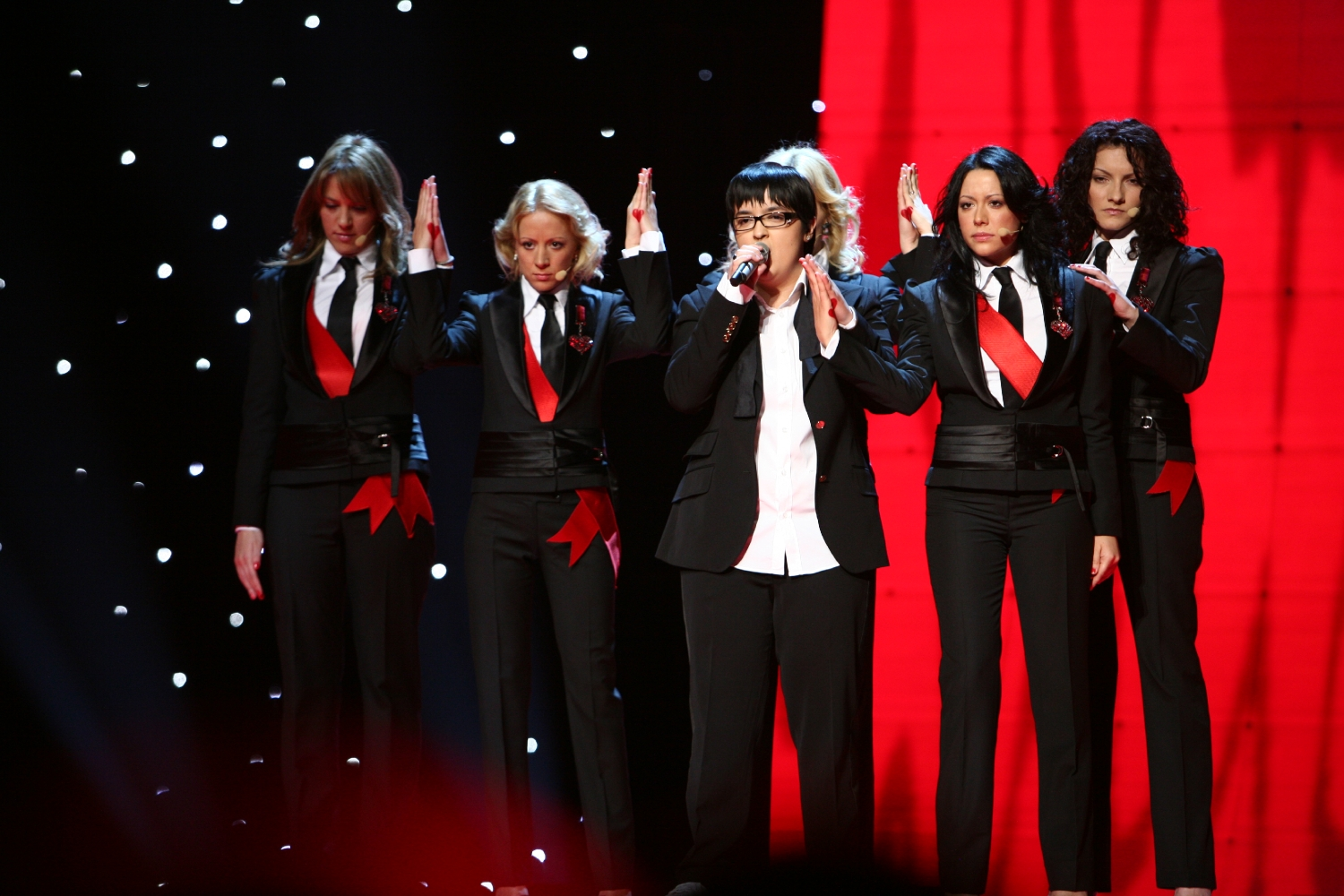
Marija Šerifović during a rehearsal before the semi-final

Marija Šerifović took part in technical rehearsals on 4 and 6 May, followed by dress rehearsals on 9 and 10 May. The Serbian performance featured Marija Šerifović performing in a white and black shirt with black trousers together with five backing vocalists in black costumes. The performance began with the backing vocalists at the back of the stage turned away from the audience with Šerifović at the centre stage. The backing vocalists gradually joined Šerifović, holding hands and ultimately placing their hands on Šerifović. The stage lighting and background LED screens predominately displayed red colours and a burning sun. The five backing vocalists that joined Marija Šerifović on stage were: Ksenija Milošević, Sanja Bogosavljević, Suzana Dinić, Ivana Selakov, and Ana Milenković.

At the end of the show, Serbia was announced as having finished in the top 10 and subsequently qualifying for the grand final. It was later revealed that Serbia placed first in the semi-final, receiving a total of 298 points.

=== Final ===
The draw for the running order for the final was done by the presenters during the announcement of the ten qualifying countries during the semi-final and Serbia was drawn to perform in position 17, following the entry from Germany and before the entry from Ukraine. Marija Šerifović once again took part in dress rehearsals on 11 and 12 May before the final and Šerifović performed a repeat of her semi-final performance during the final on 12 May. Serbia won the contest placing first with a score of 268 points. This was Serbia's first victory in the Eurovision Song Contest, making Serbia the second country to win with a debut entry after Switzerland's win at the inaugural edition in 1956.

=== Voting ===
Below is a breakdown of points awarded to Serbia and awarded by Serbia in the semi-final and grand final of the contest. The nation awarded its 12 points to Hungary in the semi-final and the final of the contest.

==== Points awarded to Serbia ====
Points awarded to Serbia (Semi-final)
| Score | Country |
|---|---|
| 12 points | Austria; Bosnia and Herzegovina; Croatia; Czech Republic; Hungary; Macedonia; Montenegro; Slovenia; Switzerland |
| 10 points | Armenia; Belarus; Germany; Iceland; Netherlands; Sweden |
| 8 points | Bulgaria; Cyprus; Finland; Georgia; Ireland; Norway; Russia; Ukraine |
| 7 points | France; Israel |
| 6 points | Denmark; Moldova; Romania |
| 5 points | Greece; Poland; Spain; United Kingdom |
| 4 points | Belgium; Portugal |
| 3 points | |
| 2 points | Albania; Latvia |
| 1 point | Lithuania; Malta |

Points awarded to Serbia (Final)
| Score | Country |
|---|---|
| 12 points | Austria; Bosnia and Herzegovina; Croatia; Finland; Hungary; Macedonia; Montenegro; Slovenia; Switzerland |
| 10 points | Norway; Sweden |
| 8 points | Czech Republic; France; Germany; Malta; Netherlands; Poland |
| 7 points | Armenia; Belarus; Belgium; Iceland |
| 6 points | Bulgaria; Denmark; Georgia; Romania; Ukraine |
| 5 points | Moldova; Portugal; Russia |
| 4 points | Greece; Ireland |
| 3 points | Cyprus; Israel; Latvia |
| 2 points | |
| 1 point | Albania; Spain |

==== Points awarded by Serbia ====
Points awarded by Serbia (Semi-final)
| Score | Country |
|---|---|
| 12 points | Hungary |
| 10 points | Macedonia |
| 8 points | Montenegro |
| 7 points | Slovenia |
| 6 points | Croatia |
| 5 points | Bulgaria |
| 4 points | Belarus |
| 3 points | Denmark |
| 2 points | Poland |
| 1 point | Portugal |

Points awarded by Serbia (Final)
| Score | Country |
|---|---|
| 12 points | Hungary |
| 10 points | Macedonia |
| 8 points | Bosnia and Herzegovina |
| 7 points | Russia |
| 6 points | Bulgaria |
| 5 points | Slovenia |
| 4 points | Greece |
| 3 points | Ukraine |
| 2 points | Belarus |
| 1 point | Moldova |
