= Beauty Queens =

Serbian musical group

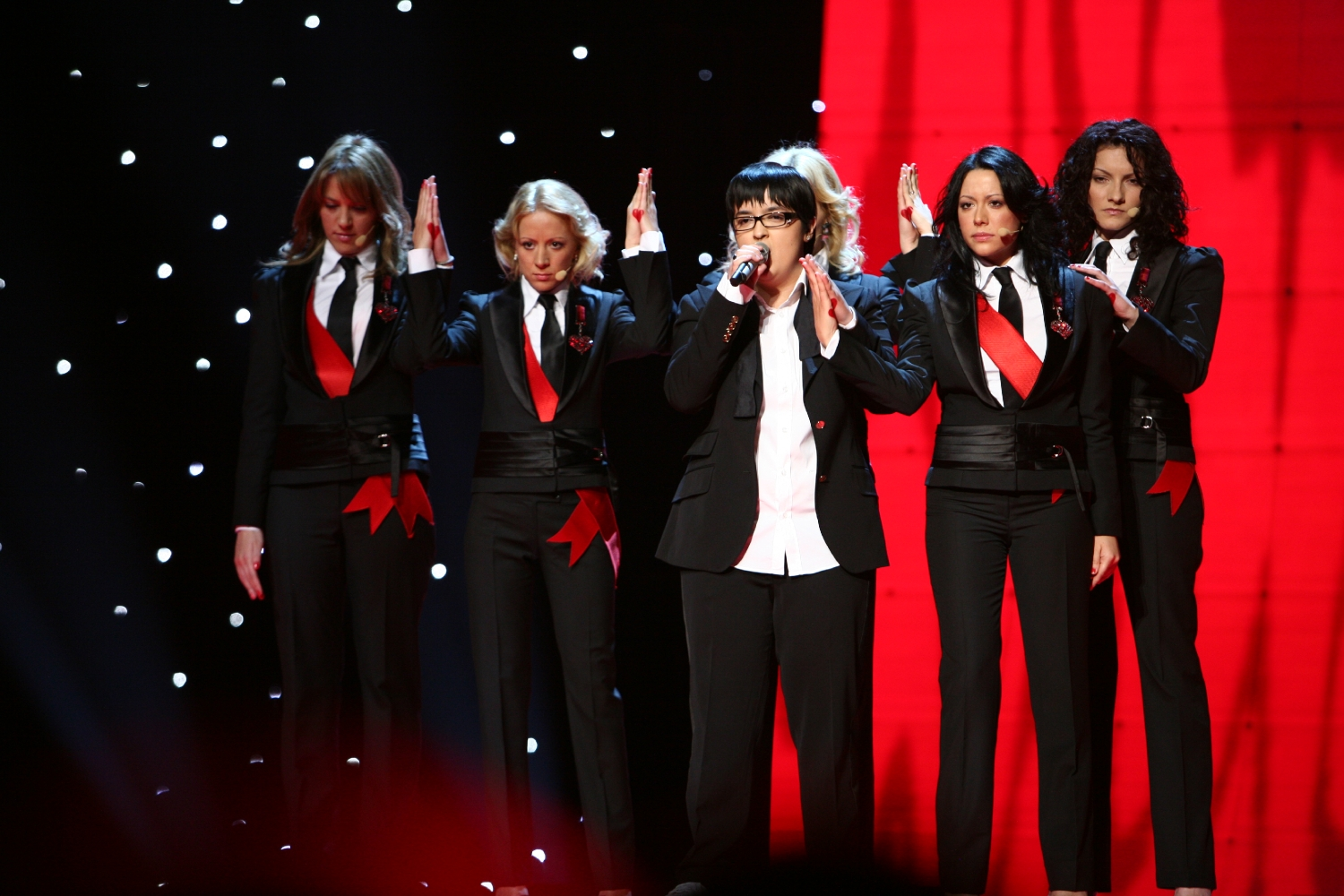
- Beauty Queens sing "Molitva" with Marija Šerifović at Eurovision Song Contest 2007. From left to right: Suzana Dinić, Ana Milenković, Ivana Selakov, Sanja Bogosavljević, Ksenija Milošević

Background information
- Origin: Belgrade, Serbia
- Genres: Pop
- Years active: 2007—2011
- Label: City Records
- Past members: Ksenija Milošević (2007—2011); Sanja Bogosavljević (2007—2011); Suzana Dinić (2007—2011); Bojana Racić (2010—2011); Marina Pavlović (2010—2011); Ivana Selakov (2007—2010); Ana Milenković (2007—2010)

Beauty Queens were a Serbian girlband, formed in Helsinki, Finland, in May 2007, after Marija Šerifović's victory in the Eurovision Song Contest 2007. The girls sang Šerifović's backing vocals. They also reached third place at Beovizija 2008.

== The members ==
- Sanja Bogosavljević (2007—2011)

Born in Belgrade, on June 28, 1979. She is a graduate of the Faculty of Music Arts (Piano Class). At the age of ten, she participated in the festival "Children sing hits" and finished second. She sang in the RTB Children's Choir for a long time. Sanja was a member of the band "Divas", which took part in the Belgrade Spring Festival. She was a backing vocalist for famous musicians. Sanja has been performing at various clubs in Belgrade with the Blah Blah Band for eight years. In 2006 and 2007, they participated in Beovizija. They won the best newcomer award in 2006.

- Suzana Dinić (2007—2011)

Born on June 1, 1986. At the age of 16, she enrolled in the Faculty of Music Arts in Zajecar and studied the piano. She performed her first solo concert when she was ten. At the concert in Ukraine, she was accompanied by the Lavovski Philharmonic Orchestra. She has won many awards at the national and international piano and singing competitions. Since 2003, she has been singing in the choir "Collegium Musicum" conducted by Darinka Matić Marović.

- Ksenija Milošević (2007—2011)

Born in Belgrade in 1982. She studied the violin in the class of professor Dejan Mihailović and graduated from the Faculty of Music Arts in Belgrade. In 2005, she received the M.A. degree. Ksenija has won many awards and performed as a soloist with prominent Serbian orchestras. Since 2001, she has been a deputy concertmaster of the Belgrade Philharmonic Orchestra. She has held the position of a concertmaster for two seasons. She participated in many international festivals with the ethno band "Ognjen and Friends". In 2006, she sang the back vocals on Hari Mata Hari's song which represented Bosnia and Herzegovina at the Eurovision Song Contest 2006.

- Ana Milenković (2007—2010)

Born in Belgrade, on April 19, 1980. She has appeared as a soloist at many festivals - Belgrade Spring (2000), Budva Festival (2001), Eurosong (2004) and Zrenjanin Festival (2004). In 2005, she joined the Blah Blah Band. They successfully participated in the Beovizija 2006 and 2007. In 2006, the band won the best newcomer award. She has worked with prominent musicians from Serbia and Montenegro. She did vocal back-up for the big pop star Zdravko Colic and a very popular singer Vlado Georgiev.

- Ivana Selakov (2007—2010)

Born in Belgrade, on November 8, 1978. She grew up in Sombor where she was introduced to the world of music. She finished Lower Music School, participated in numerous singing competitions, performed at jazz and rock'n'roll clubs. In 1997, she started studying biology in Belgrade, but very soon she devoted herself to music. After biology, Ivana have started studying "Recording and designing of the sound", and she has almost finished it. She has appeared as a soloist at several festivals - Radio Festival, Beovizija 2006, etc. She did vocal back-up for many popular artists.

- Bojana Racić (2010—2011)
- Marina Pavlović (2010—2011)

== Band work ==
Their first performance after Eurovision Song Contest was at the Budva Music Festival, in July 2007, where they came second with the song "Pet na jedan". Despite not winning, their song became a huge radio hit. In August, they took part in Ohrid Fest with the song "Protiv srca". They came second again, but their song became very popular in the Republic of Macedonia, reaching the top position on almost all Macedonian music charts.

In March 2008, Beauty Queens took part in Beovizija 2008. In their semi-final they came first, but in the final they ended up third: Jelena Tomašević won. They competed with a song named "Zavet", which was somewhat reminiscent Marija Šerifović's "Molitva". Indeed, the song was written by Vladimir Gaić and Saša Milošević Mare, who had also written "Molitva". The song became very popular in Serbia. Beauty Queens were given the chance to represent Serbia at the Eurovision Second Chance competition.

On June 1, 2008, Beauty Queens sang the song of Tajči "Hajde da ludujemo" (with this song, Tajci represented SFR Yugoslavia at Eurovision Song Contest 1990) at the Vrnjačka Banja Music Festival. They didn't compete, just sang the song during voting. Beauty Queens were hosts of the special show about Belgrade's night life for Discovery Channel. The girls competed at the 2008 Sunčane skale Festival, with the song "Ti ili on". They won the third place.

== Discography ==
=== Albums ===
- 2011: Ne mogu te naći

=== Singles ===
- 2007: "Rukoilen" - "Molitva" in Finnish
- 2007: "Pet na jedan"
- 2007: "Protiv srca"
- 2008: "Zavet"
- 2008: "Ti ili on"
- 2009: "Afrodizijak"
- 2009: "Superstar" (feat. Oskar & Đorđe Marjanović)
- 2010: "Dve iste"

== See also ==
- List of all-female bands
- Beovizija 2008
- Eurovision Song Contest 2007
