= Dinic =

Dinic may refer to:

- Dinić, a surname
- Dinič, a surname
- DiNic, a surname
- Dinic's algorithm
