= Katarina Živković =

Serbian singer (born 1989)

- Born: 2 July 1989 (age 36); Leskovac, SR Serbia, Yugoslavia
- Genres: Pop-folk
- Occupation: Singer
- Instrument: vocals
- Years active: 2007–present
- Labels: Grand Production; IDJTunes

Katarina Živković (Serbian Cyrillic: Катарина Живковић, born 2 July 1989) is a Serbian singer from Leskovac. She rose to prominence as a contestant on the singing competition show Zvezde Granda in 2007. Her debut album, titled Ludo srce, was released in 2013.

Živković won the third series of the reality television show Farma (2010), receiving the cash prize of €100,000.

== Discography ==
Studio albums

- Ludo srce (2013)
- Porok (2017)
- Kurtizana (2024)

== Filmography ==
- Zvezde Granda (2007)
- Farma (2013); winner
