= I'm No Angel (disambiguation) =

I'm No Angel is a 1933 film starring Mae West and Cary Grant, also a song sung by West in the film

I'm No Angel may also refer to:

== Music ==
- I'm No Angel (album), a 1987 album by the Gregg Allman Band
- I'm No Angel, a 1993 album by Carole Davis
- "I'm No Angel" (Bill Medley song), a 1982 song notably covered by the Gregg Allman Band in 1987
- "I'm No Angel" (Marcella Detroit song), a 1994 song
- "I'm No Angel", a song from the 1999 album No Angel by Dido
- "I'm No Angel", a song from the 2001 album South by Heather Nova

== Other uses ==
- I'm No Angel (manga), a manga series by Ai Yazawa
- Tenshi Ja Nai!!, (I'm No Angel), a manga series by Takako Shigematsu
- I'm No Angel: From Victoria's Secret Model to Role Model, an autobiography written by former runway model Kylie Bisutti
- "I'm No Angel", an episode from Supernatural

== See also ==
- I'm Not an Angel (disambiguation)
- No Angel (disambiguation)
