= Sanja Bogosavljević =

Sanja Bogosavljević Сања Богосављевић
- Born: Belgrade, SR Serbia, SFR Yugoslavia
- Genres: Pop
- Occupations: Singer, pianist
- Years active: 1999–present
- Label: City Records (2007–)
- Website: Beauty Queens Official

Sanja Bogosavljević (Serbian Cyrillic: Сања Богосављевић) is a Serbian singer and a member of the girlband Beauty Queens, which was formed by gathering backing vocalists of Marija Šerifović after victory in the Eurovision Song Contest 2007.

In 2020, she entered Beovizija with the song "Ne puštam". She performed as the seventh in the first semifinal on 28 February, but didn't manage to qualify to the final.

== Before Beauty Queens ==
She is an advanced student at the Faculty of Music Arts (Piano Class). At the age of ten, she participated in the festival "Children are singing hits" and finished second. She sang in the RTB Children's Choir for a long time. Sanja was the member of the band "Divas" which took part in the Belgrade Spring Festival. She did vocal back-up for famous musicians. Sanja has been performing at various clubs in Belgrade with the Blah Blah Band for eight years. In 2006 and 2007, they successfully participated in the Beovizija Festival. They won the best newcomer award in 2006.

== Beauty Queens (2007–) ==
See Beauty Queens.

== Discography ==
=== Blah Blah Band ===
Singles:

- 2006: "Maler"
- 2007: "Rulet"

=== Beauty Queens ===
==== Albums ====
- 2008: TBA

==== Singles ====
- 2007: "Pet na jedan"
- 2007: "Protiv srca"
- 2008: "Zavet"
