= Betty Boop (band) =

Serbian power pop girl band

- Origin: Belgrade, Serbia
- Genres: Power pop, pop rock
- Years active: 2005–present
- Label: City Records
- Members: Marija Mandic; Anja Prošić; Nina Doroškov; Teodora Baković
- Past members: Kristina Krspogačin
- Website: bettyboopgirls.synthasite.com

Betty Boop is a Serbian power pop girl band from Zrenjanin.

== Band history ==
The band was formed in 2005 in Belgrade, Serbia, consisting of Marija Mandic (vocals and guitar), Anja Prošić (drums), Nikolina "Nina" Doroškov (bass guitar) and Kristina Krspogačin (vocals and guitar), under the guidance of their songwriter and manager Ognjen Cvekić.

They have been contestants in many festivals, including Zrenjanin (2005), Izbor za dečju pesmu Evrovizije (2006), Sunčane Skale (2006 and 2008), Slavianski Bazaar and Beovizija (2007 and 2008). In Beovizija 2007 their song "Sama" finished in 5th place. They improved their ranking the following year when their single "Kvar" placed fourth in Beovizija 2008. In 2008 they won the New Star award at Sunčane Skale festival in Herceg Novi. Previously, they came 2nd in 2006.

In 2008 Krspogačin left the band, and Teodora Baković from Belgrade joined.

== Members ==
- Marija Mandic (born 28 December 1991) — vocals and guitar
- Nina Doroškov (born 27 September 1990) — bass guitar
- Anja Prošić (born 19 January 1993) — drums
- Kristina Krspogačin (born 6 June 1992) — vocals and guitar (2003–2008)
- Teodora Baković (born 5 January 1991) — vocals, rhythm guitar (2008 - )

== Discography ==
=== Singles ===
- "Tajna" (2005.)
- "Bolja od tebe" (2006)
- "Sama" (2007)
- "Kvar" (2008)
- "Dobar dan" (2010)
- "Niko kao ti" (2010)
- "Blizu" (TBA)
- "Loša devojka" (TBA)
- "Srčana mana" (TBA)
