= Ivana Selakov =

Serbian singer (born 1978)

Ivana Selakov Ивана Селаков
- Born: 8 November 1978 (age 47); Belgrade, SR Serbia, Yugoslavia
- Instrument: Vocals
- Years active: 1997–present
- Labels: Grand Production; Isound Publisher
- Formerly of: Beauty Queens

Ivana Selakov (Serbian Cyrillic: Ивана Селаков, pronounced [ǐʋana sɛlǎkɔʋ]; born 8 November 1978) is a Serbian singer. She was a member of the girlband Beauty Queens, which was formed by gathering backing vocalists of Marija Šerifović after victory in the Eurovision Song Contest 2007. During her career, she received numerous awards in Serbia – best singer, best song, best album, best duet and others.

== Biography ==
Selakov was born in Belgrade, on 8 November 1978. She grew up in Sombor where she was introduced to the world of music. She finished Lower Music School, participated in numerous singing competitions, performed at jazz and rock 'n' roll clubs. In 1997, she started studying biology in Belgrade, but very soon she devoted herself to music. After biology, Ivana started studying "Recording and designing of the sound".

She has appeared as a soloist at several festivals—Radio Festival, Beovizija 2006, etc. She did vocal back-up for many popular artists, she has more than 2000 back vocals did for other singer and bands. Since 2007, she has been publishing her records under Serbian label and production company Grand Production.

In 2016 she was acting judge in children's singing show "Neki novi klinci".

== Beauty Queens ==
See Beauty Queens.

== Discography ==
=== Albums ===
==== Sreća (2010) ====
1. Uradi mi to
2. Ako je do mene (duet sa Darkom Radovanovićem)
3. Srce gubitnik
4. Otplovimo
5. Uteha
6. Briga me
7. Sad odlazi
8. Moje je ime sreća
9. Nek na tvoju dušu ide sve

==== Probijam led (2012) ====
1. Tuga k`o i svaka druga
2. Daleko si (feat. Aca Lukas)
3. Probijam led (feat. DJ Shone)
4. Pobediću bol
5. Jastuci
6. Naše malo slavlje
7. Igraj dok postojiš (feat. DJ Shone/Sha)
8. Mesec dana
9. Između redova
10. Heroj
11. Probijam led (RMX by DJ Shone)

==== S.O.S (2016) ====
1. Samačka
2. Agonija
3. Polovna
4. Omaklo mi se (duet sa Acom Lukasom)
5. Grad grad
6. Tek sad
7. Bolujem godinama
8. SOS
9. Ljubav u doba kokaina (duet sa Acom Lukasom)
10. Godine i laži
11. Nema plana (feat. Sha)

=== Singles ===
- Pet na jedan (2007) Beauty Queens
- Protiv srca (2007) Beauty Queens
- Zavet (2008) Beauty Queens
- Moje odbrane
- Dobrodosao medju bivse
- Ima nesto
- Da se opet rodim feat. Mirza Selimovic (2017)
- Hitno feat. DJ Shone (2019)
- Eto zato (2019)
- Spasi me budalo (2019)
- Ona druga (2019)
- Bubamaro
- Boli boli feat. Amar Gile (2020)
- Ti i ja feat. Sedativ bend
- Etiketiran
- Baksis (2023)
- Dozivotno (2023)
- Margina (2023)
- Kamata feat. Amar Gile (2024)
