= Vladan Dinić =

Serbian journalist, TV host and editor (born 1949)

Vladan Dinic
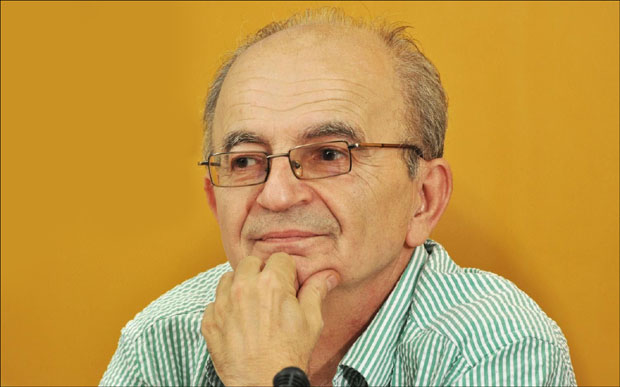
- Born: May 25, 1949 (age 76); Zadar, FPR Yugoslavia, now Croatia
- Occupation: journalist
- Website: http://www.svedok.rs

Vladan Dinić (Serbian Cyrillic: Владан Динић; born May 25, 1949) is a Serbian journalist, TV-host and editor-in-chief of "Svedok" magazine.

== Early life ==
Vladan Dinić was born in Zadar (SFR Yugoslavia) on the 25 of May 1949. His father served as an Officer in the JNA Army in Zadar at the time. When Vladan was born, his father left the military and the family moved to Niš, Serbia, where they originally come from. Dinić studied law at the University of Niš.

== Journalist ==
His journalistic career started in 1968 when he wrote on chess tournaments in south-east Serbia for the leading national daily "Politika". In 1971, Dinić began working as a correspondent for the "Večernje novosti", the biggest daily newspaper in SFR Yugoslavia. First articles Dinić wrote were about chess tournaments, both from Yugoslavia and abroad. At the same time Dinić started reporting on social and political issues in Yugoslavia and Serbia. In 1975 Dinić moved to Ćuprija in Central Serbia, where he worked as a correspondent from the region. In 1986 he moved to Belgrade.

Dinić was the first journalist to do an interview with Jovanka Broz after the death of Josip Broz Tito. After 13 years of silence since Tito's death, Jovanka Broz spoke out for the first time in public in a series of interviews to Vladan Dinić. The interviews were published in "Večernje novosti" in 1993. Unpublished parts of the interviews were later published by Dinić in "Svedok" and in his book on Jovanka.

In the early 1990s Dinić frequently reported for "Večernje novosti" on the breakup of Yugoslavia, from Slovenia, Croatia and Bosnia and Herzegovina.

== Editor ==
He was the editor-in-chief of "Novosti plus" before becoming one of the editors of the first independent weekly in Serbia - "Nedeljni Telegraf".

In May 1995 Vladan Dinić started his own weekly "Svedok" which gained high popularity reporting on the Balkan criminal underground and on the links between crime and politics. Dinić ran "Svedok" until 2020 and once remarked that he is "the only journalist in Serbia who can say who owns the newspaper he works for"—a pointed reference to the shadow ownership of many Serbian media outlets.

== Television host ==
Vladan Dinić is also known as a host of political talk-shows on local televisions in Serbia. For a number of years in the late 1990s he presented a TV-show "Svedočenje" on TV Belle Amie in his hometown Nish, at that time, one of a few opposition televisions in Serbia. From 2008 to 2009 he hosted a political talk-show "Politikon" on TV Palma Plus from Jagodina in Serbia. His guests included leading Serbian politicians such as Zoran Đinđić, Vojislav Koštunica, Vuk Drašković, Vojislav Šešelj, Tomislav Nikolić, Aleksandar Vučić, etc.

== Author ==
Dinić has published several books: "Život u matiranoj zemlji" ("Life in a checkmated country") which was published in Spain, and "Fišer, kralj šaha" ("Fischer, the king of chess") which was published in 2008 in Serbia. He also authored a book of interviews with Jovanka Broz, the widow of late Yugoslav president Josip Broz Tito, titled "Osuđena bez suđenja: Šta mi je pričala Jovanka Broz" ("Sentenced without trial: What Jovanka Broz said to me" (2013), Dinić also published a book discussing the mysterious background into the life and identity of Josip Broz Tito - "Tito (ni)je Tito - konačna istina" (Tito is(not) Tito - the final truth) (2013). In 2014 Dinić published a book about the Sarajevo assassination which was a trigger for WW1. The book is titled: "Sarajevski atentat 1914. Princip i Veliki rat" ("The Sarajevo assassination of 1914. Princip and the Great War").

== Personal life ==
Vladan Dinić lives in Belgrade. He is married and has two sons. His younger son, Milan Dinić, is also a journalist.
