= Verica Šerifović =

Serbian folk singer (born 1963)

- Верица Шерифовић
- Born: 12 September 1963 (age 62); Kragujevac, SR Serbia, SFR Yugoslavia
- Occupation: Singer
- Years active: 1988–present
- Spouses: Rajko Šerifović (divorced): Mića Nikolić
- Children: Marija Šerifović
- Musical career
- Genres: Folk
- Instrument: vocals
- Labels: Diskos; Jugodisk; Zabava miliona; Grand Production

Verica Šerifović (Serbian Cyrillic: Верица Шерифовић; born 12 September 1963) is a Serbian folk singer. She is the mother and first teacher of Marija Šerifović who was the winner of Eurovision Song Contest 2007.

Verica Šerifović's repertoire consists mostly of folk songs.

== Personal life ==
Verica was born in Kragujevac, her family being Orthodox Christian from the surroundings of Kragujevac. Her first marriage was to Rajko Šerifović, a drummer from Kragujevac of mixed Muslim-Orthodox parentage. Verica had four miscarriages and, with her fifth pregnancy, gave birth to a daughter, Marija, on 14 November 1984. Verica's husband Rajko left her for another woman when she was nine months pregnant with Marija and had a son, Danijel Pavlović, with the other woman in 1985. Marija has described her father as an abusive alcoholic that would regularly beat Verica.

Šerifović's second marriage was to musician Mića Nikolić.

== Discography ==
- Možda postoji neko (1988)
- Mi smo srećan par (1991)
- Ako ima Boga (1993)
- Verica Šerifović (1996)
- Vol. 7 (1997)
- Sa tobom ponovo (1998)
- Ciganska snaja (2001)
- Veruješ li (2005)
- I to će proći (2006)
- Ti mi uvek trebaš (2008)
