= Bez Ljubavi =

Studio album by Marija Šerifović
- Released: 2006
- Recorded: 2005
- Genre: Pop
- Label: City Records

Marija Šerifović chronology
Naj, Najbolja (2003)	Bez Ljubavi (2006)	Molitva - The Best Of (2007)

Singles from Bez Ljubavi
- 1. "Bez ljubavi" Released: 2006; 2. "101" Released: 2006

Bez Ljubavi (English: Without Love) is the second studio album from Serbian pop singer Marija Šerifović. The album was released in 2006.

== Track listing ==
1. "Povredi me"
2. "Jesen bez nas"
3. "101"
4. "Na tvojoj košulji"
5. "Pamti me po suzama"
6. "Laž"
7. "Nije mi prvi put"
8. "Bilo bi ti bolje"
9. "Bez Ljubavi"
10. "Trubači"
11. "U nedelju" (winning song of Serbian Radio Festival 2005)
12. "Bol do ludila" (winning song of the 2004 Pjesma Mediterana music festival in Budva)
13. "Gorka čokolada" (performed at the Budvanski Festival 2003)
