= Suzana Dinić =

Serbian singer and pianist

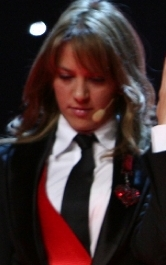

Background information
- Born: Suzana Dinić; 1 June 1986 (age 40); Zaječar, Serbia, then SFR Yugoslavia
- Genre: Pop
- Occupations: Singer, pianist
- Years active: 1996–present
- Label: City Records (2007–)
- Formerly of: Beauty Queens
- Website: Beauty Queens Official

Suzana Dinić (Serbian Cyrillic: Сузана Динић, born 1 June 1986 in Zaječar, Serbia, SFR Yugoslavia) is a Serbian singer and pianist and a member of the girlband Beauty Queens, which was formed by gathering backing vocalists of Marija Šerifović after victory in the Eurovision Song Contest 2007

== Before Beauty Queens ==
Dinić was born on 1 June 1986. At the age of 16, she enrolled in the Faculty of Music Arts in Zaječar and studied the piano. She performed her first solo concert when she was ten. At the concert in Ukraine, she was accompanied by the Lavovski Philharmonic Orchestra. She has won many awards at the national and international piano and singing competitions. Since 2003, she has been singing in the choir "Collegium Musicum" conducted by Darinka Matić Marović.

== Beauty Queens ==
See Beauty Queens.

== Discography ==
=== With Beauty Queens ===
==== Albums ====
- 2008: TBA

==== Singles ====
- 2007: "Pet na jedan"
- 2007: "Protiv srca"
- 2008: "Zavet"
