= Naj, Najbolja =

Studio album by Marija Šerifović
- Released: 23 August 2003
- Label: City Records

Marija Šerifović chronology
Naj, Najbolja (2003)	Bez Ljubavi (2006)

Singles from Naj, Najbolja
- 1. "Znaj da znam" Released: 2003; 2. "Naj, najbolja" Released: 2003

Naj, Najbolja (English: The Very, Very Best) is the debut studio album from Serbian pop singer Marija Šerifović released in 2003. Videos were shot for the songs "Znaj da znam" and "Naj, najbolja".

== Track listing ==
1. "Znaj da znam"
2. "Sad idi nek' te đavo nosi"
3. "Naj, najbolja"
4. "Još jedan korak"
5. "Ti mi se sviđaš"
6. "Ti i samo ti"
7. "Volim ga"
8. "Za sreću nam malo treba"
