= Ksenija Milošević =

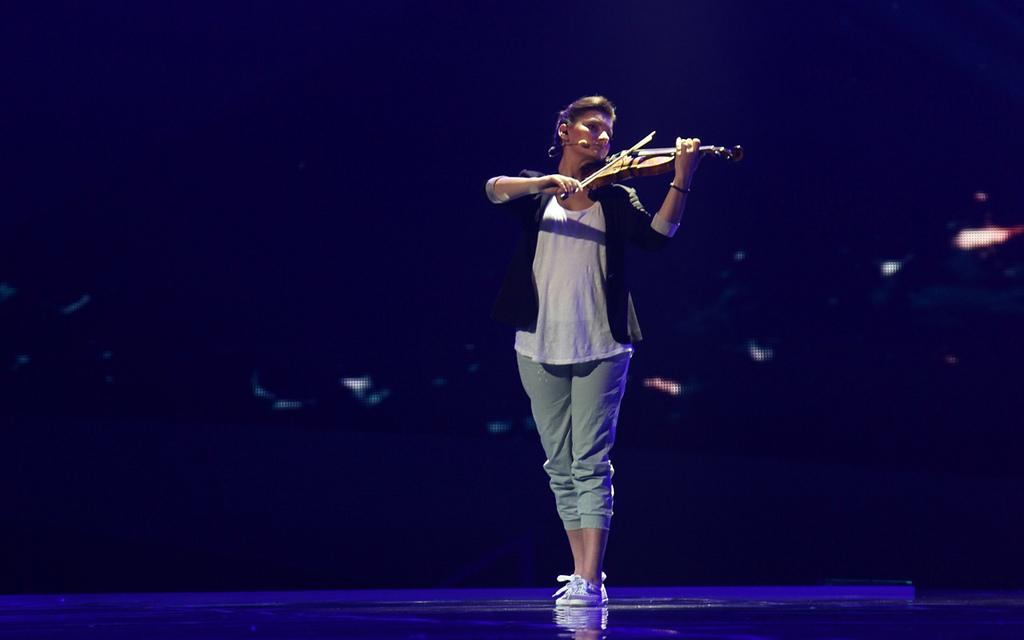
- Ksenija Milosevic plays on violin during Eurovision Song Contest 2012

Background information
- Birth name: Ksenija Milošević
- Born: April 26, 1982 (age 42); Belgrade, Serbia, former SFR Yugoslavia
- Genres: Pop
- Occupation(s): Singer, violinist
- Years active: 2001–present
- Labels: City Records (2007–present)
- Website: Beauty Queens Official

Ksenija Milošević (Serbian Cyrillic: Ксенија Милошевић, born April 26, 1982, Belgrade, Serbia, former SFR Yugoslavia) is a Serbian singer and violinist, and a member of the girlband Beauty Queens, which was formed by gathering backing vocalists of Marija Šerifović after victory in the Eurovision Song Contest 2007.

== Before the band ==
Milošević was born in Belgrade in 1982. She studied the violin in the class of professor Dejan Mihailovic and graduated from the Faculty of Music Arts in Belgrade. In 2005, she received the M.A. degree. Ksenija has won many awards and performed as a soloist with prominent Serbian orchestras. Since 2001, she has been a deputy concertmaster of the Belgrade Philharmonic Orchestra. She has held the position of a concertmaster for two seasons. She participated in many international festivals with the ethno band "Ognjen and Friends".

== Eurovision ==
In 2006, she played violin and sang backing vocals on Hari Mata Hari's song, which represented Bosnia & Herzegovina at the Eurovision Song Contest 2006. In 2007, she was a backing vocalist in Serbia's winning entry Molitva. In 2012, she played violin and sang backing vocals on Željko Joksimović's song Nije Ljubav Stvar representing Serbia at the Eurovision Song Contest 2012. Milošević was a backing vocalist in Eurovision for the fourth time for Moje 3 representing Serbia at Eurovision Song Contest 2013.

== Beauty Queens ==
See Beauty Queens.

== Discography ==
=== With Beauty Queens ===
==== Albums ====
- 2008: TBA

==== Singles ====
- 2007: "Pet na jedan"
- 2007: "Protiv srca"
- 2008: "Zavet"
