= No Angel (disambiguation) =

No Angel is a 1999 album by Dido.

No Angel(s) may also refer to:

== Arts, entertainment, and media ==
=== Music ===
- No Angels, a German pop group
- "No Angel" (Birdy song), 2013
- "No Angel" (Beyoncé song), 2013
- "No Angel" (Charli XCX song), 2018
- "No Angel (It's All in Your Mind)", a 2003 song by No Angels
- "No Angels" (song), by Justin Timberlake, 2024
- "No Angel", a song by Simon Townshend from the album Animal Soup, 1999
- "No Angels", a song by Bastille, 2023
- "No Angels", a song by Coi Leray from the album Coi, 2023

=== Television ===
- No Angels (TV series)
- "No Angel" (Doctors), a 2004 episode

== See also ==
- Angel (disambiguation)
- I'm No Angel (disambiguation)
