= Nisam Anđeo =

Studio album by Marija Šerifović
- Released: 2008
- Recorded: 2007–2008
- Genre: Pop
- Label: City Records

Marija Šerifović chronology
Molitva - The Best Of (2007)	Nisam Anđeo (2008)	Anđeo (2009)

Singles from Nisam Anđeo
- 1. "Nisam anđeo" Released: 2008

Nisam anđeo (trans. I'm Not An Angel) is the third studio album from Serbian pop singer Marija Šerifović. The album was released in 2008. The title of her next album Anđeo (Angel), released a year later, appeared to be linked to the name of her third album.

== Track listing ==
1. "Nisam anđeo"
2. "Jedan dobar razlog"
3. "Sve po starom"
4. "Ne voliš je znam"
5. "Podvala"
6. "Zabranjena priča"
7. "Kasno da te menjam"
8. "Vreme je da krenem"
9. "Bolji život"
