= Molitva =

2007 song by Marija Šerifović

Single by Marija Šerifović

from the album Molitva - The Best Of
- Language: Serbian
- Released: 27 July 2007
- Genre: Pop
- Length: 3:03
- Label: Connective
- Composer: Vladimir Graić
- Lyricist: Saša Milošević Mare

Marija Šerifović singles chronology
"101" (2006)	"Molitva" (2007)	"Nisam anđeo" (2008)

Eurovision Song Contest 2007 entry
- Country: Serbia
- Artist: Marija Šerifović
- Language: Serbian
- Composer: Vladimir Graić
- Lyricist: Saša Milošević Mare

Finals performance
- Semi-final result: 1st
- Semi-final points: 298
- Final result: 1st
- Final points: 268

Entry chronology
- "Oro" (2008) ►

Official performance video
- "Molitva" (Final) on YouTube

"Molitva" (Serbian Cyrillic: Молитва; "Prayer") is a song recorded by Serbian singer Marija Šerifović with music composed by Vladimir Graić and Serbian lyrics by Saša Milošević Mare. It represented Serbia in the Eurovision Song Contest 2007, held in Helsinki, resulting in the country's only ever win at the contest.

The song marked the country's Eurovision debut as an independent nation, the State Union of Serbia and Montenegro having been dissolved in June 2006. It was released as a CD single in nine different versions on 27 July 2007.

== Background ==
=== Conception ===
"Molitva" was composed by Vladimir Graić with Serbian lyrics by Saša Milošević Mare. It was recorded by Marija Šerifović in Serbian, English (as "Destiny" with lyrics by Jovan Radomir), and Russian (as "Молитва" with lyrics by Andy Mikheev). It was released as a CD single in nine different versions on 27 July 2007 by Connective Records after its win at Eurovision.

=== National selection ===
On 7–8 March 2007, "Molitva" performed by Šerifović competed in Beovizija 2007, the national final organised by Radio Television of Serbia (RTS) to select its song and performer for the 52nd edition of the Eurovision Song Contest. The song won the competition becoming the Serbian entry – and Šerifović the performer – for Eurovision.

=== Eurovision ===
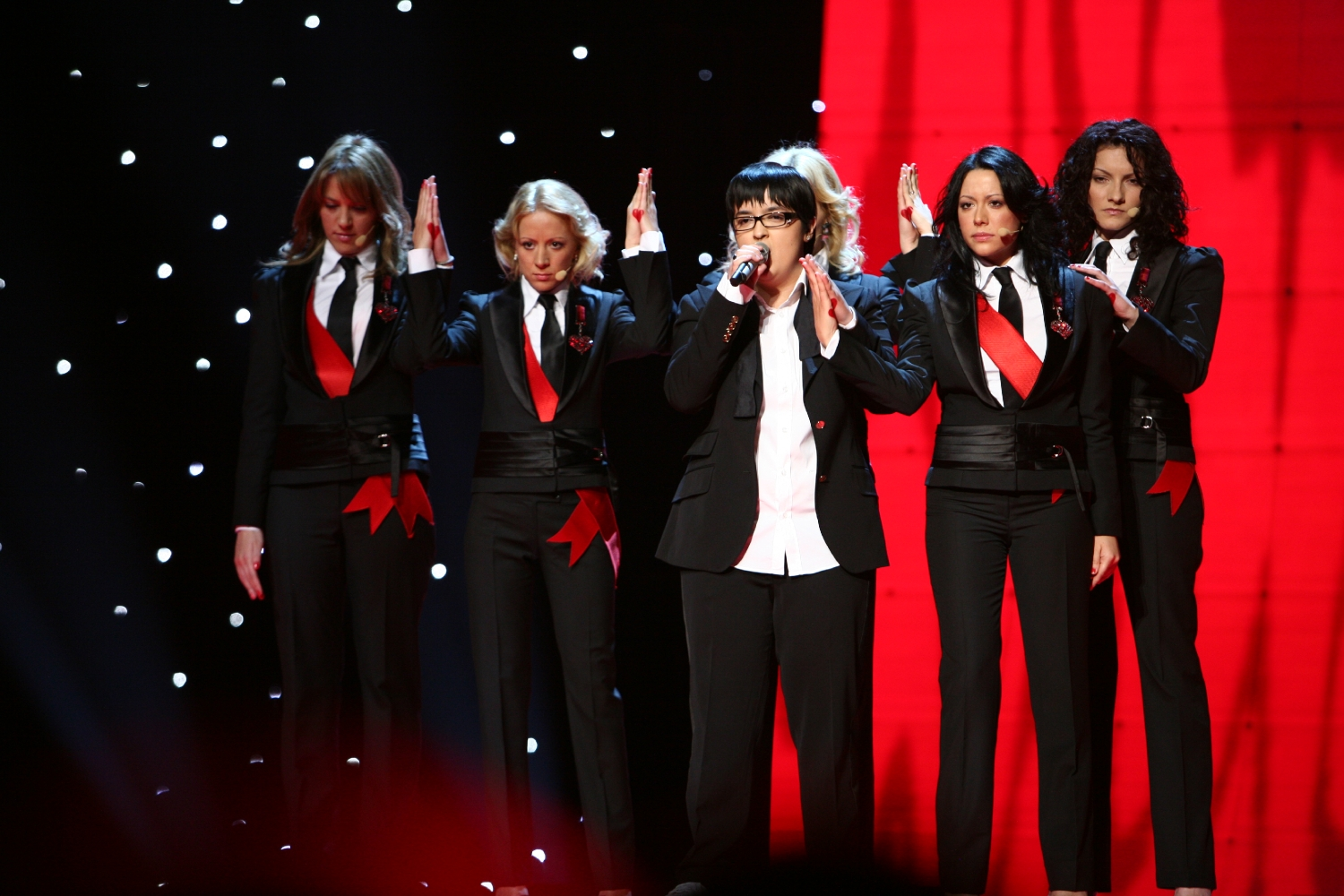
Šerifović performing "Molitva" at the Eurovision Song Contest.

On 10 May 2007, the Eurovision Song Contest semi-final was held at the Hartwall Areena in Helsinki. As this was Serbia's Eurovision debut as an independent nation, the song had to compete in the semi-final. Šerifović performed "Molitva" as the fifteenth song of the evening and received 298 points, placing first in a field of twenty-eight field and qualifying for the final. It was the highest number of points ever gained in the semi-final under the single semi-final format of the contest (2004–2007).

The song is memorable for its stage presentation because it lacked dance routines, revealing or showy costumes, pyrotechnics and other gimmicks – Eurovision is often accused of concentrating on these things instead of the music itself. Many elements of "Molitva" contrasted with the previous winner, "Hard Rock Hallelujah" by Finnish hard rock band Lordi. Šerifović's performance was complemented by the presence of the five backing singers – who after the contest joined together to form the group Beauty Queens.

On 12 May 2007, the final for the Eurovision Song Contest was held. Šerifović performed "Molitva" seventeenth on the evening. and received 268 points, winning the contest. It was the first song containing no English language lyrics to win since "Diva" by Dana International win for Israel in 1998. Molitva was the last entirely non-English song to win the contest until the 2017 contest, where Portugal won with "Amar pelos dois" by Salvador Sobral, as well as being the first time a ballad had won since televoting became the standard, and the first one of the so-called "Balkan ballads" that came to prominence since the late 1990s to win the contest.

It was succeeded as the Serbian entry by "Oro" by Jelena Tomašević and as the winning song by "Believe" by Dima Bilan for Russia.

=== Aftermath ===
As the winning broadcaster, the European Broadcasting Union (EBU) gave RTS the responsibility to host the following edition of the Eurovision Song Contest. On 24 May 2008, Šerifović sang "Molitva" as the opening act of the grand final.

On 24 May 2012, Šerifović performed her song during the interval act of the second semi-final of the Eurovision Song Contest 2012 held in Baku accompanied by traditional Azeri musical instruments. The television special Eurovision: Europe Shine a Light, aired on 16 May 2020 throughout Europe, features Šerifović performing the song in an empty street in Belgrade.

Molitva was included in the list of the ten best Eurovision winners according to the Special Broadcasting Service (SBS) in 2016 and to The Independent in 2019, while The Eurovision Times, a fan blog, ranked it as the third best Eurovision song of all time.

== Track listing ==
1. "Molitva" (Serbian version) – 3:03
2. "Destiny" (English version) – 3:04
3. "Molitva" (Russian version) – 3:01
4. "Molitva" (Magnetic Club reload mix Serbian version) – 4:26
5. "Destiny" (Magnetic Club reload mix English version) – 4:23
6. "Molitva" (Magnetic Club reload mix Russian version) – 4:25
7. "Molitva" (Jovan Radomir remix) – 3:38
8. "Rukoilen" (Finnish version) – 3:06
9. "Molitva" (instrumental) – 3:02

== Charts ==
Chart (2007)	Peak position
Belgium (Ultratip Bubbling Under Flanders)	4
Sweden (Sverigetopplistan)	9
Switzerland (Schweizer Hitparade)	19
UK Singles (Official Charts)	112

== Legacy ==
=== Other versions ===
The English version is titled "Destiny", the Russian version is titled "Молитва" (Molitva), and the Finnish version is called "Rukoilen"; these were performed by the Beauty Queens, without Šerifović. The song has also been released as a dance remix and a remix named "Jovan Radomir mix" by Swedish TV-presenter Jovan Radomir, who also wrote the English lyrics. An instrumental version has also been released as well as a karaoke version. The UK oompah band Oompah Brass recorded an instrumental version of "Molitva" on their album Oompocalypse Now (2008), premiered at the 2007 Belgrade Beer Festival.

=== In other media ===
Molitva has been often played for many successes Serbia has had in the year 2007. It was played at a welcome party for Serbia's tennis players after their French Open successes. During Wimbledon 2007, Molitva was often used during clips displaying the courts and players on the BBC. It was mainly used before and after footage or interviews with the Serbian players.

In 2013, Yulia Samoylova performed the Russian version of the song at her audition for the Russian version of X Factor, Faktor A. She would later be selected to represent Russia in the Eurovision Song Contest 2017, but was barred from entering the host country of that edition, Ukraine. She would subsequently be repicked in 2018.

A short 10-second instrumental theme of the song, used during Eurovision 2008, was used on RTS between scheduled broadcasts as short intermezzo or when presenting RTS programme/image for several years.

In 2015, the chorus of the song was played on Day 102 of the soap opera parody Kalyeserye of the Philippine noontime variety show Eat Bulaga!.

Preceded by "Hard Rock Hallelujah" by Lordi	Eurovision Song Contest winners 2007	Succeeded by "Believe" by Dima Bilan
