= Marija Šerifović =

Serbian singer (born 1984)

Marija Šerifović Марија Шерифовић
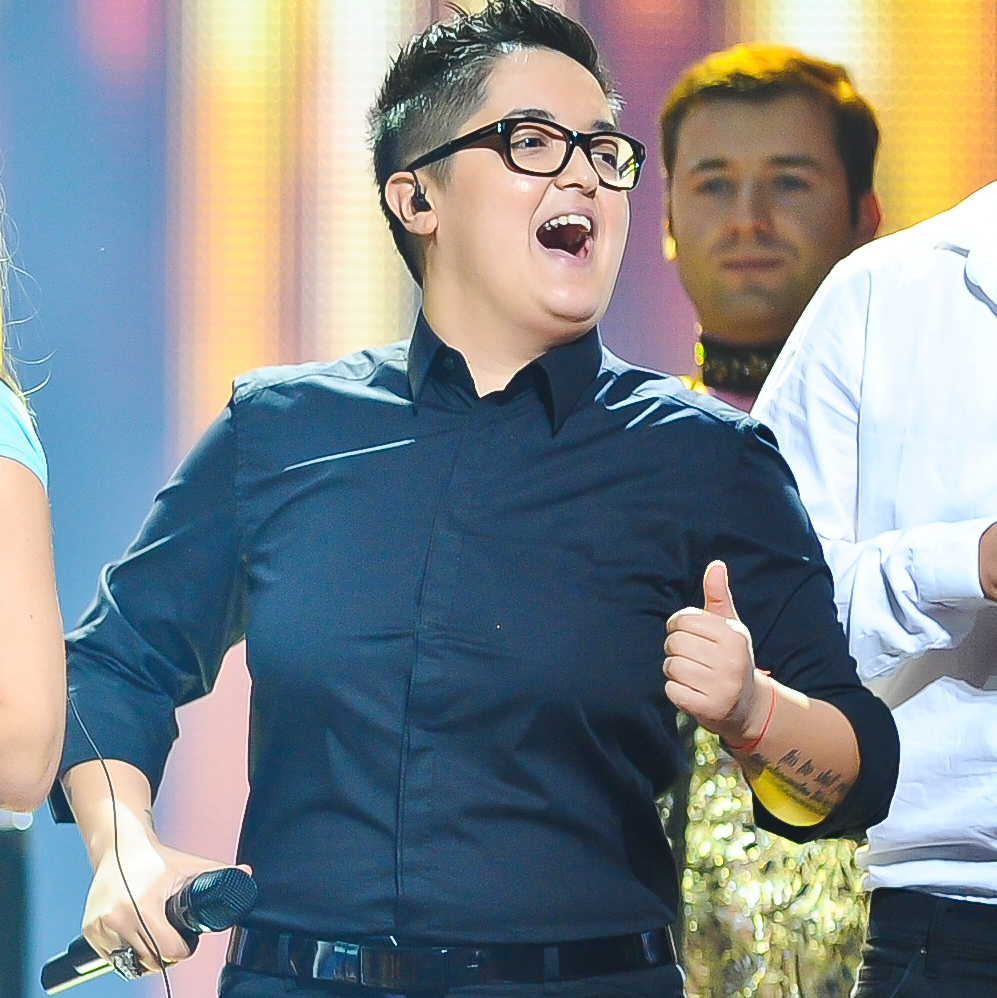
- Šerifović in 2012

Background information
- Born: 14 November 1984 (age 41); Kragujevac, SR Serbia, SFR Yugoslavia
- Genres: Pop; adult contemporary
- Occupations: Singer; producer; TV personality; YouTuber
- Instrument: Vocals
- Years active: 1998–present
- Labels: City Records; IDJTunes; Dallas Records

Marija Šerifović (Serbian Cyrillic: Марија Шерифовић, pronounced [mǎrija ʃerǐːfovitɕ]; born 14 November 1984) is a Serbian singer. Born in Kragujevac, she is best known for winning the Eurovision Song Contest 2007 with "Molitva", becoming Serbia's first and to date only winning entry.

Šerifović made her recording debut in 1998 and has released six studio albums as well as numerous standalone singles. Additionally, she served as a judge on the Serbian reality-TV singing competition Zvezde Granda between 2015 and 2025. She has won the Artistic Marcel Bezençon Award for "Molitva" and two regional MAC Awards. Predominantly recognized for balladic songs, Šerifović is often regarded as one of the best female pop vocalists in Serbia.

== Early life ==
Šerifović was born on 14 November 1984 in Kragujevac. She is the only child to musicians Verica and Rajko Šerifović. When Verica was nine months pregnant with Marija, Rajko left Verica for another woman with whom he had a son, Danijel Pavlović, who is a singer and vocal coach. Marija described her father as a violent alcoholic who would regularly beat her mother. According to the column by The Guardian's Germaine Greer, she is of Romani descent and has been out as a lesbian since 2004. Šerifović graduated from the First Grammar School in Kragujevac.

In 1998, she made her recording debut with a television performance of the song "Moje bube", which she recorded with her mother.

== Career ==
=== 2003-2006: Career beginnings, Naj, Najbolja and Bez ljubavi ===
Her debut album Naj, Najbolja was released under City Records in 2003. The following year, Šerifović participated at the Pjesma Mediterana music festival in Budva with the song "Bol do ludila", winning the first prize. In 2006, she released her second album Bez Ljubavi, which was a year later promoted with her first solo concert at Sava Centar in Belgrade.

=== 2007-2010: Eurovision Song Contest, Nisam anđeo and Anđeo ===
In March 2007, Šerifović competed at the Serbian national selection festival for the Eurovision Song Contest 2007, called Beovizija, with the song "Molitva". On the final on 8 March, she was declared the winner by receiving most televotes and coming second on the jury's vote, and thus became the first Eurovision representative of Serbia since the country restored its independence as a sovereign state in 2006. At the Eurovision, Šerifović performed 15th during the semi-final on 10 May, placing first with 298 points. Subsequently, at the grand final on 17 May, she sang 17th. Her performance of "Molitva" scored the maximum of 268 points and was declared the winner of the 52nd Eurovision. Upon returning home, Šerifović was greeted by reportedly 70,000 people in front of the House of the City Assembly of Belgrade.

In 2008, she released her third studio album Nisam anđeo, which sold 120,000 copies. A year later, it was followed by Anđeo, which sold 100,000 copies. Same year, Šerifović announced a solo concert at the Belgrade Arena for 11 May 2009. In 2010, she participated on the second season of the reality television show Farma, which she voluntarily left after 27 days.

=== 2011-2020: Hrabro, standalone singles and Zvezde Granda ===
Šerifović was the subject of a documentary film, titled Ispovest (Confession), in which she reflected on her sexual orientation as well as personal struggles, such as domestic abuse from her father. The documentary premiered at Sava Centar in November 2013. The following year, she also released an autobiography of the same name. In May 2014, Šerifović released her fifth album Hrabro. It sold 50,000 copies.

In September 2015, she became a judge on the singing competition Zvezde Granda. As a mentor on the show, she had the winning contestant for two consecutive seasons with Džejla Ramović in 2019 and Mahir Mulalić in 2021. In 2015 and 2016, she released a series of three songs: "Pametna i luda", "Sama i nervozna" and "Svoja i tvoja". In March 2016, Šerifović held a concert at Zetra Hall, Sarajevo. Same month she also performed at the National Theater in Belgrade, which saw polarizing reception from the general public and indignation from actors' union. In December 2016, Šerifović released "Deo prošlosti" under IDJTunes. A year later in November, she released the single "11". Šerifović again performed to a sold-out Belgrade Arena on 25 May 2018.

Between March and May 2019, she embarked on a tour called Druga strana ploče, where she sang the covers of her favorite songs from other artists as well as her own hits. It featured seven sold out shows, six of which were held at Belgrade's Sava Centar and one in SPC Vojvodina, Novi Sad. The second rendition of the tour began a year later. It was supposed to include four live shows in Sava Centar, however, the last one was eventually cancelled due to COVID-19 pandemic. Same year, she also released her The Best of compilation under Dallas Records.

=== 2021-present: Dolazi ljubav ===
During March 2022, Šerifović held five concerts in Banja Luka, Zagreb and Belgrade under the title Druga strana ploče Vol.3. The one in Zagreb was held to an audience of 10,000 people. In late December 2022, she released the single "Dobar Vam dan", which scored over million views in the first 24 hours. On 6 October 2023, Šerifović released her sixth studio album, titled Dolazi ljubav, under IDJTunes.

Šerifović made a guest appearance on the Serbian show Kec na jedanaest on 15 October where she spoke about the album; she revealed how much love and emotions she put in while recording the songs. She also shared that two of the album's songs, "Pola sunca", featuring Matija Cvek which was also released as a single on 6 October 2023 and "Drugačija" were its highlights. The song was commercially very successful, peaking at number three on Billboard's Croatia Songs for the week ending 21 October 2023.

== Legacy of "Molitva" ==
In May 2007, Serbian magazine Nedeljnik highlighted that Šerifović focused her Eurovision performance on vocal delivery rather than on spectacle, which is often linked to Eurovision entries, citing her quote: "I like to hear music, not to watch it". Furthermore, the article compared her international success to those of tennis players Ana Ivanovic, Jelena Janković and Novak Djokovic.

In 2010, The Eurovision Times declared "Molitva" as the third best Eurovision entry of all time. Moreover, in 2016, Special Broadcasting Service ranked Šerifović among the top ten most deserving winners of the Eurovision. In 2019, "Molitva" was also placed at number ten on The Independent's listing of Eurovision winners.

== Personal life ==
Šerifović has not openly declared as a lesbian. In her 2014 documentary Ispovest, Šerifović admitted that she has had relationships with other women. Serbian LGBT magazine Optimist commented on it as "one of the clearest anti-identity coming-outs on the Serbian public scene". During her 2022 New Year's Eve concert in front of the House of the National Assembly of Serbia, Šerifović included an image of the rainbow flag with the quote "Ljubav je zakon" (Love is Law) in reference to the legalization of same-sex domestic partnerships in Serbia.

She became a mother to a son born via surrogacy in December 2023.

In January 2008, Šerifović performed at a pre-election rally organized by the Serbian Radical Party. She has since voiced her regrets about this, stating that it was not a statement of political affiliation, but a paid engagement. Because of the incident, her role as an ambassador for the European Union during the 'Year of Intercultural Dialogue' was questioned by a spokesperson of the European Commission.

During an interview held at the show Kec na jedanaest, Šerifović shared that she "feels most at home" in all the countries of former Yugoslavia.

== Discography ==
- Naj, Najbolja (2003)
- Bez Ljubavi (2006)
- Nisam Anđeo (2008)
- Anđeo (2009)
- Hrabro (2014)
- Dolazi ljubav (2023)

== Filmography ==
Filmography of Marija Šerifović
Year	Title	Role	Notes
2007	Beovizija 2007	Herself	Winner
2007	Eurovision Song Contest 2007	Herself	Winner
2010	Farma	Herself	Season 2; Quit on day 27
2013	Ispovest	Herself	
2015-2025	Zvezde Granda	Herself	Judge and mentor

== Awards and nominations ==
Awards and nominations of Marija Šerifović
Year	Award	Category	Nominee/work	Result	Ref.
2007	Marcel Bezençon Awards	Artistic Award	Herself	Won	
2019	Music Awards Ceremony	Female Pop Song of the Year	"Nije ljubav to"	Nominated	
2019	Music Awards Ceremony	Music Video Song of the Year	"11"	Nominated	
2019	Music Awards Ceremony	Concert of the Year	Štark Arena, 24 May 2017	Nominated	
2019	Music Awards Ceremony	Female Artist of the Year	Herself	Won	
2020	Music Awards Ceremony	Concert of the Year	Druga strana ploče (Sava Centar)	Won	

== Tours ==
- A sad malo ja Tour (2018–2020)
- Dolazi ljubav Tour (2024–ongoing)

== See also ==
- Music of Serbia
- List of singers from Serbia
- Serbia in the Eurovision Song Contest

Awards and achievements
Preceded by (Finland) Lordi with Hard Rock Hallelujah	Winner of the Eurovision Song Contest; 2007	Succeeded by (Russia) Dima Bilan with Believe
Preceded by (Serbia and Montenegro) No name	Serbia in the Eurovision Song Contest; 2007	Succeeded by Jelena Tomašević with Oro
Preceded by Flamingosi feat Louis	Beovizija winner 2007	Succeeded by Jelena Tomašević with Oro
Preceded by Saša Matić; Dado Topić	Music Festival Budva winner 2004	Succeeded by Tijana Dapčević
