= Belarus in the Eurovision Song Contest 2017 =

- Eurovision Song Contest 2017
- Participating broadcaster: Belarusian Television and Radio Company (BTRC)
- Country: Belarus
- Selection process: National final
- Selection date: 20 January 2017

Competing entry
- Song: "Story of My Life"
- Artist: Naviband
- Songwriters: Arciom Lukjanienka

Placement
- Semi-final result: Qualified (9th, 110 points)
- Final result: 17th, 83 points

Participation chronology

Belarus was represented at the Eurovision Song Contest 2017 with the song "Story of My Life", written by Arciom Lukjanienka, and performed by the band Naviband. The Belarusian participating broadcaster, the Belarusian Television and Radio Company (BTRC), selected its entry through a national final. This was the first-ever entry performed in Belarusian in the Eurovision Song Contest.

The national final consisted of fourteen competing acts participating in a televised production where "Historyja majho žyccia" (Гісторыя майго жыцця) performed by Navi was selected as the winner following the combination of votes from a jury panel and public televoting. The song was later retitled as "Story of My Life" for Eurovision, while the band was renamed as Naviband.

Belarus was drawn to compete in the second semi-final of the Eurovision Song Contest which took place on 11 May 2017. Performing during the show in position 14, "Story of My Life" was announced among the top 10 entries of the second semi-final and therefore qualified to compete in the final on 13 May. It was later revealed that Belarus placed ninth out of the 18 participating countries in the semi-final with 110 points. In the final, Belarus performed in position 3 and placed seventeenth out of the 26 participating countries, scoring 83 points.

== Background ==
Prior to the 2017 contest, the Belarusian Television and Radio Company (BTRC) had participated in the Eurovision Song Contest representing Belarus thirteen times since its first entry in 2004. Its best placing in the contest was sixth, which it achieved in 2007 with the song "Work Your Magic" performed by Koldun. Following the introduction of semi-finals for the 2004 contest, it had managed to qualify to the final four times. In 2016, it failed to qualify to the final with the song "Help You Fly" performed by Ivan.

As part of its duties as participating broadcaster, BTRC organises the selection of its entry in the Eurovision Song Contest and broadcasts the event in the country. The broadcaster has used both internal selections and national finals to select its entry for Eurovision in the past. Since 2012, BTRC has organised a national final in order to choose its entry, a selection procedure that continued for its 2017 entry.

== Before Eurovision ==
=== National final ===
The Belarusian national final took place on 20 January 2017. Thirteen songs participated in the competition and the winner was selected through a jury and public televote. The show was broadcast on Belarus 1, Belarus 24 and Radius FM as well as online via the broadcaster's official website tvr.by.

==== Competing entries ====
Artists and composers were able to submit their applications and entries to the broadcaster between 4 November 2016 and 24 November 2016. At the closing of the deadline, 67 entries were received by the broadcaster. Auditions were held on 30 November 2016 at the BTRC "600 Metrov" studio where a jury panel was tasked with selecting up to fifteen entries to proceed to the televised national final. The auditions were webcast online at the official BTRC website. The jury consisted of Olga Salamakha (deputy director of the TV channel Belarus 1), Inna Mardusevich (chief specialist of the concert and festival art management projects of the Ministry of Culture of Belarus), Elena Treschinskaya (head of the radio station "Radius FM"), Dmitry Dolgolev, Oleg Averin (musician/composer), Ludmila Kutz (singer and vocal teacher), Sergei Andrianov (journalist), Mikhail Revutsky (head of the section of culture at TV Infoservice) and Evgeny Perlin (television host). Thirteen finalists were selected and announced on 30 November 2016.

Artist	Song	Songwriter(s)
Aleksandra Tkach	"Be Stronger"	Aleksandra Tkach
Anastasiya Sheverenko	"We'll Be Together"	Maxim Aleynikov, Irina Filatova
Angelica Pushnova	"We Should Be Together"	Kirill Ermakov, Natalya Tambovtseva
Isaac Nightingale	"On the Red Line"	Vadim Kapustin
July	"Children of the World"	Dmitry Fomich
Kattie	"Wild Wind"	Anders Hansson, Sharon Vaughn
Lermont x Julic	"Heartbeat"	Vasiliy Selischev, Anton Rubatskiy
Napoli	"Let's Come Together"	Michael James Down, Primož Poglajen, Niklas Hast
Navi	"Historyja majho žyccia" (Гісторыя майго жыцця)	Arciom Lukjanienka
Nikita Hodas	"Voices in My Head"	Nikita Hodas
Nuteki	"Take My Heart"	Mikhail Nokarashvili, Dawn Michel
Provokatsiya	"My Love"	Anatoliy Chepikov, Svyatoslav Pozdnyak, Ilya Yermak
Vladislav Kurasov	"Follow the Play"	Vladislav Kurasov, Natalya Rostova

==== Final ====
The televised final took place on 20 January 2017 at the "600 Metrov" studio in Minsk, hosted by Olga Ryzhikova and 2014 Belarusian Eurovision contestant Teo. Prior to the competition, a draw for the running order took place on 9 December 2016. A 50/50 combination of votes from seven jury members made up of music professionals and public televoting selected the song "Historyja majho žyccia" performed by Navi as the winner. The song became Belarus' first entry to be performed in the Belarusian language at the Eurovision Song Contest. The jury consisted of Valery Dayneko (chairman of the jury, singer), Olga Salamakha (deputy director of the TV channel Belarus 1), Elena Treshchinskaya (head of the radio station "Radius FM"), Alexander Kapenkin (director of the TV channel TV BelMuz), Vladimir Bogdan (producer, presenter, director of the radio station "Radio New"), Ludmila Kutz (singer and vocal teacher) and Inna Mardusevich (chief specialist of the concert and festival art management projects of the Ministry of Culture of Belarus).

In addition to the performances from the competitors, the show featured guest performances by the hosts Olga Ryzhikova and Teo, Uzari, who represented Belarus in 2015, and Ivan, who represented Belarus in 2016.

Final – 20 January 2017
R/O	Artist	Song	Jury	Televote		Total	Place
R/O	Artist	Song	Jury	Votes	Points	Total	Place
1	July	"Children of the World"	1	7,078	8	9	7
2	Aleksandra Tkach	"Be Stronger"	5	894	2	7	10
3	Vladislav Kurasov	"Follow the Play"	4	463	0	4	11
4	Navi	"Historyja majho žyccia"	12	3,626	6	18	1
5	Isaac Nightingale	"On the Red Line"	8	445	0	8	8
6	Kattie	"Wild Wind"	0	658	1	1	12
7	Nuteki	"Take My Heart"	10	3,069	5	15	2
8	Napoli	"Let's Come Together"	2	7,271	10	12	5
9	Nikita Hodas	"Voices in My Head"	7	1,117	3	10	6
10	Angelica Pushnova	"We Should Be Together"	3	1,278	4	7	9
11	Anastasiya Sheverenko	"We'll Be Together"	6	5,361	7	13	3
12	Lermont x Julic	"Heartbeat"	0	202	0	0	13
13	Provokatsiya	"My Love"	0	9,238	12	12	4

=== Promotion ===
Naviband made several appearances across Europe to specifically promote "Story of My Life" as the Belarusian Eurovision entry. On 25 March, Naviband performed during the Eurovision PreParty Riga, which was organised by OGAE Latvia and held at the Crystal Club Concert Hall in Riga. Between 3 and 6 April, Naviband took part in promotional activities in Tel Aviv, Israel where she performed during the Israel Calling event held at the Ha'teatron venue. On 8 April, Naviband performed during the Eurovision in Concert event which was held at the Melkweg venue in Amsterdam, Netherlands and hosted by Cornald Maas and Selma Björnsdóttir.

== At Eurovision ==
According to Eurovision rules, all nations with the exceptions of the host country and the "Big Five" (France, Germany, Italy, Spain and the United Kingdom) are required to qualify from one of two semi-finals in order to compete for the final; the top ten countries from each semi-final progress to the final. The European Broadcasting Union (EBU) split up the competing countries into six different pots based on voting patterns from previous contests, with countries with favourable voting histories put into the same pot. On 31 January 2017, a special allocation draw was held which placed each country into one of the two semi-finals, as well as which half of the show they would perform in. Belarus placed into the second semi-final, to be held on 11 May 2017, and was scheduled to perform in the second half of the show.

Once all the competing songs for the 2017 contest had been released, the running order for the semi-finals was decided by the shows' producers rather than through another draw, so that similar songs were not placed next to each other. Belarus was set to perform in position 15, following the entry from Switzerland and before the entry from Bulgaria. But after Russia was removed from the running order of the competition following their withdrawal from the contest, Belarus' position shifted to 14.

The two semi-finals and the final were broadcast in Belarus on Belarus 1 and Belarus 24 with commentary by Evgeny Perlin. BTRC appointed Alyona Lanskaya, who represented Belarus in the 2013 contest, as its spokesperson to announce the top 12-point score awarded by the Belarusian jury during the final.

=== Semi-final ===
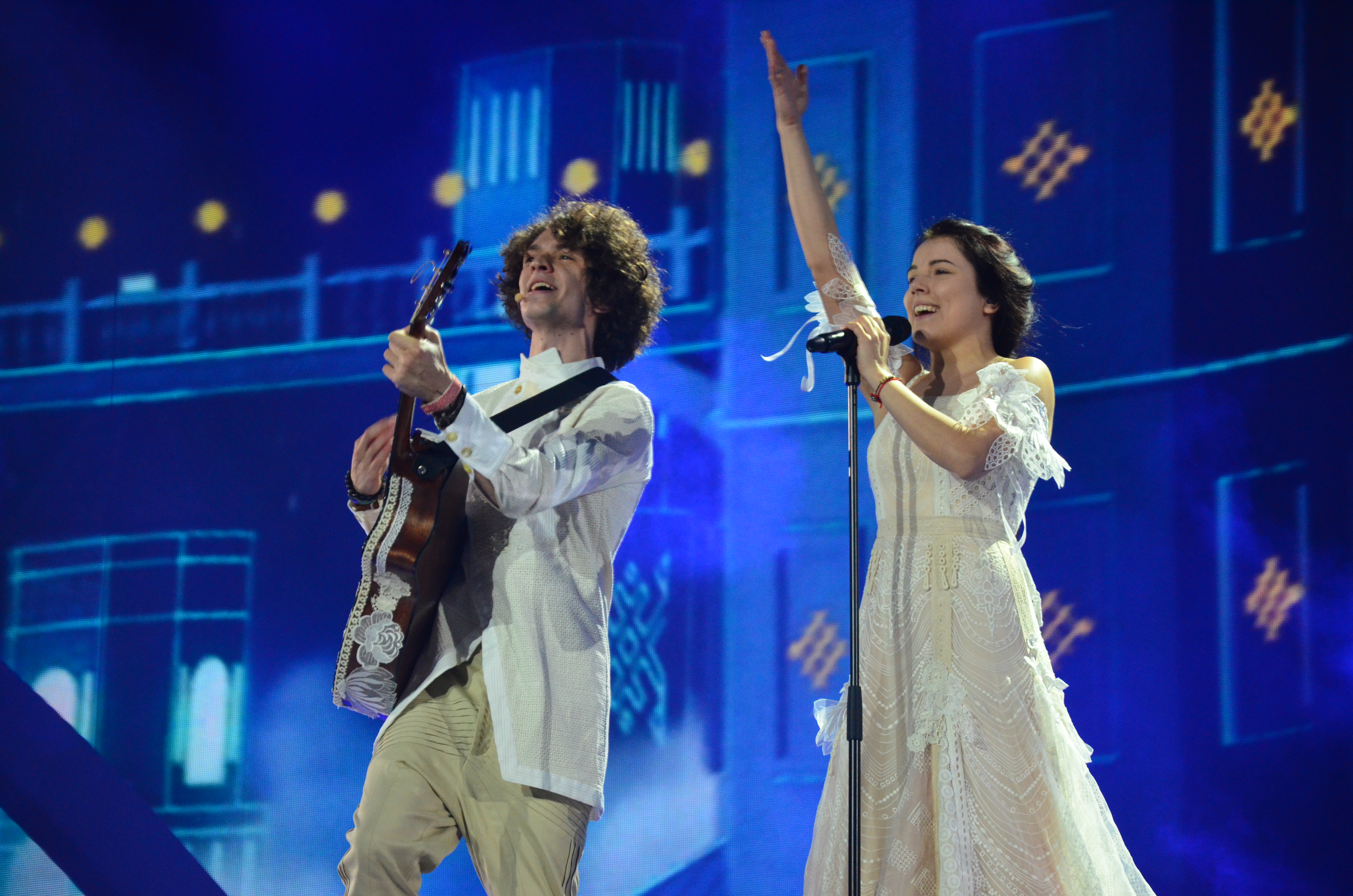
Naviband during a rehearsal before the second semi-final

Naviband took part in technical rehearsals on 3 and 6 May, followed by dress rehearsals on 10 and 11 May. This included the jury show on 10 May where the professional juries of each country watched and voted on the competing entries.

The Belarusian performance featured the members of Naviband performing on a boat prop on stage with two large spinning fans. The band were in white outfits: Arciom Lukjanienka wore a tan waistcoat, while Kseniya Zhuk wore a long flowing white dress. The LED screens displayed a fast moving cloudy sky, a large blue globe and traditional symbols, while the performance also featured smoke and pyrotechnic effects. Naviband was joined by four off-stage backing vocalists: Alena Verbitskaya, Anna Chet, Michael Soul and Olga Rozaleon-Sashalskaya.

At the end of the show, Belarus was announced as having finished in the top 10 and subsequently qualifying for the grand final. It was later revealed that Belarus placed ninth in the semi-final, receiving a total of 110 points: 55 points from both the televoting and the juries.

=== Final ===
Shortly after the second semi-final, a winners' press conference was held for the ten qualifying countries. As part of this press conference, the qualifying artists took part in a draw to determine which half of the grand final they would subsequently participate in. This draw was done in the reverse order the countries appeared in the semi-final running order. Belarus was drawn to compete in the first half. Following this draw, the shows' producers decided upon the running order of the final, as they had done for the semi-finals. Belarus was subsequently placed to perform in position 3, following the entry from Poland and before the entry from Austria.

Naviband once again took part in dress rehearsals on 12 and 13 May before the final, including the jury final where the professional juries cast their final votes before the live show. The band performed a repeat of their semi-final performance during the final on 14 May. Belarus placed sixteenth in the final, scoring 83 points: 33 points from the televoting and 50 points from the juries.

=== Voting ===
Voting during the three shows involved each country awarding two sets of points from 1-8, 10 and 12: one from their professional jury and the other from televoting. Each participating broadcaster assembled a five-member jury panel consisting of music industry professionals who were citizens of the country they represent, with their names published before the contest to ensure transparency. This jury judged each entry based on: vocal capacity; the stage performance; the song's composition and originality; and the overall impression by the act. In addition, no member of a national jury was permitted to be related in any way to any of the competing acts in such a way that they cannot vote impartially and independently. The individual rankings of each jury member as well as the nation's televoting results were released shortly after the grand final.

Below is a breakdown of points awarded to Belarus and awarded by Belarus in the second semi-final and grand final of the contest, and the breakdown of the jury voting and televoting conducted during the two shows:

==== Points awarded to Belarus ====
Points awarded to Belarus (Semi-final 2)
Score	Televote	Jury
12 points	Ukraine	Ukraine
10 points		France
8 points	Israel; Lithuania	
7 points		Austria; Croatia; Malta
6 points	Estonia	
5 points	Bulgaria	Israel
4 points		
3 points	Croatia; France; Netherlands	Hungary; Lithuania
2 points	Hungary; Serbia	
1 point	Austria; Ireland; Romania	Switzerland

Points awarded to Belarus (Final)
Score	Televote	Jury
12 points		Azerbaijan; Ukraine
10 points		
8 points	Ukraine	
7 points		Austria
6 points	Georgia; Latvia	
5 points		Croatia
4 points	Poland	
3 points	Czech Republic	Greece; Moldova
2 points	Estonia; Israel	Bulgaria; Latvia; Malta
1 point	Lithuania; Moldova	Israel; United Kingdom

==== Points awarded by Belarus ====
Points awarded by Belarus (Semi-final 2)
Score	Televote	Jury
12 points	Bulgaria	Bulgaria
10 points	Hungary	Norway
8 points	Estonia	Netherlands
7 points	Israel	Lithuania
6 points	Norway	Austria
5 points	Romania	Malta
4 points	Croatia	Serbia
3 points	Ireland	Croatia
2 points	Switzerland	Denmark
1 point	Lithuania	Estonia

Points awarded by Belarus (Final)
Score	Televote	Jury
12 points	Bulgaria	Bulgaria
10 points	Moldova	Portugal
8 points	Hungary	Sweden
7 points	Portugal	Australia
6 points	Belgium	Norway
5 points	Norway	Netherlands
4 points	France	Austria
3 points	Sweden	Denmark
2 points	Romania	Poland
1 point	Ukraine	Israel

==== Detailed voting results ====
The following members comprised the Belarusian jury:

- Inna Mardusevich (jury chairperson) – chief specialist of the concert and festival art management projects of the Ministry of Culture of Belarus
- Ludmila Kuts – singer and vocal teacher
- Victoria Aleshko – singer
- Alexey Gross – singer
- Leonid Shirin – composer, guitarist, arranger, poet, sound director

Detailed voting results from Belarus (Semi-final 2)
R/O	Country	Jury							Televote	
R/O	Country	I. Mardusevich	L. Kuts	V. Aleshko	A. Gross	L. Shirin	Rank	Points	Rank	Points
01	Serbia	6	8	6	8	10	7	4	17	
02	Austria	5	4	4	5	5	5	6	11	
03	Macedonia	14	17	17	16	16	16		12	
04	Malta	7	7	7	7	6	6	5	16	
05	Romania	17	14	15	15	14	15		6	5
06	Netherlands	3	3	1	4	4	3	8	13	
07	Hungary	13	9	9	11	13	12		2	10
08	Denmark	10	6	10	10	12	9	2	14	
09	Ireland	11	13	14	14	15	14		8	3
10	San Marino	16	16	16	17	17	17		15	
11	Croatia	8	10	13	6	7	8	3	7	4
12	Norway	2	2	2	2	2	2	10	5	6
13	Switzerland	15	15	12	13	11	13		9	2
14	Belarus									
15	Bulgaria	1	1	3	1	1	1	12	1	12
16	Lithuania	4	5	5	3	3	4	7	10	1
17	Estonia	9	12	8	12	9	10	1	3	8
18	Israel	12	11	11	9	8	11		4	7

Detailed voting results from Belarus (Final)
R/O	Country	Jury							Televote	
R/O	Country	I. Mardusevich	L. Kuts	V. Aleshko	A. Gross	L. Shirin	Rank	Points	Rank	Points
01	Israel	11	13	11	14	15	10	1	16	
02	Poland	9	11	25	8	9	9	2	17	
03	Belarus									
04	Austria	10	6	7	6	6	7	4	20	
05	Armenia	17	14	6	19	10	13		15	
06	Netherlands	4	7	4	7	7	6	5	22	
07	Moldova	14	15	12	10	14	12		2	10
08	Hungary	15	23	13	18	19	19		3	8
09	Italy	13	16	24	11	12	16		12	
10	Denmark	7	10	9	9	8	8	3	21	
11	Portugal	2	1	5	2	1	2	10	4	7
12	Azerbaijan	18	8	16	12	11	11		11	
13	Croatia	22	18	18	20	21	21		14	
14	Australia	3	4	8	4	4	4	7	19	
15	Greece	23	25	19	24	22	24		23	
16	Spain	24	19	20	25	25	25		24	
17	Norway	5	5	3	5	5	5	6	6	5
18	United Kingdom	25	21	21	22	23	23		18	
19	Cyprus	20	12	10	13	16	14		13	
20	Romania	12	24	22	16	17	20		9	2
21	Germany	21	20	23	23	24	22		25	
22	Ukraine	19	22	14	17	13	18		10	1
23	Belgium	16	9	15	15	18	15		5	6
24	Sweden	6	3	2	1	2	3	8	8	3
25	Bulgaria	1	2	1	3	3	1	12	1	12
26	France	8	17	17	21	20	17		7	4
