= Belarus in the Eurovision Song Contest 2016 =

- Eurovision Song Contest 2016
- Participating broadcaster: Belarusian Television and Radio Company (BTRC)
- Country: Belarus
- Selection process: National final
- Selection date: 22 January 2016

Competing entry
- Song: "Help You Fly"
- Artist: Ivan
- Songwriters: Viktor Drobysh; Alexander Ivanov; Timofei Leontiev; Mary Susan Applegate

Placement
- Semi-final result: Failed to qualify (12th)

Participation chronology

Belarus was represented at the Eurovision Song Contest 2016 with the song "Help You Fly", written by Viktor Drobysh, Alexander Ivanov, Timofei Leontiev, and Mary Susan Applegate, and performed by Ivanov himself under his stage name Ivan. The Belarusian participating broadcaster, Belarusian Television and Radio Company (BTRC), selected its entry for the contest through a national final. The national final consisted of ten competing acts participating in a televised production where public televoting selected the winner. "Help You Fly" performed by Ivan was selected as the winner with 23,167 votes.

Belarus was drawn to compete in the second semi-final of the Eurovision Song Contest which took place on 12 May 2016. Performing during the show in position 5, "Help You Fly" was not announced among the top 10 entries of the second semi-final and therefore did not qualify to compete in the final. It was later revealed that Belarus placed twelfth out of the 18 participating countries in the semi-final with 84 points.

== Background ==
Prior to the 2016 contest, Belarusian Television and Radio Company (BTRC) had participated in the Eurovision Song Contest representing Belarus twelve times since its first entry in 2004. Its best placing in the contest was sixth, achieved in 2007 with the song "Work Your Magic" performed by Dmitry Koldun. Following the introduction of semi-finals for the 2004 contest, Belarus had managed to qualify to the final four times. In 2015, "Time" performed by Uzari and Maimuna failed to qualify to the final.

As part of its duties as participating broadcaster, BTRC organises the selection of its entry in the Eurovision Song Contest and broadcasts the event in the country. The broadcaster has used both internal selections and national finals to select its entry for Eurovision in the past. Since 2012, BTRC has organised a national final in order to choose its entry, a selection procedure that continued for 2016.

== Before Eurovision ==
=== National final ===
The Belarusian national final took place on 22 January 2016. Ten songs participated in the competition and the winner was selected exclusively via a public televote. The show was broadcast on Belarus 1, Belarus 24 and Radius FM as well as online via the broadcaster's official website tvr.by and the Eurovision Song Contest's official website eurovision.tv.

==== Competing entries ====
Artists and composers were able to submit their applications and entries to the broadcaster between 23 October 2015 and 21 November 2015. The chairman of BTRC, Gennady Davydko, encouraged applicants to submit entries in the Belarusian language. At the closing of the deadline, 91 entries were received by the broadcaster. Auditions were held on 26 November 2015 and 1 December 2015 at the BTRC "600 Metrov" studio where a jury panel was tasked with selecting up to fifteen entries to proceed to the televised national final. The auditions were webcast online at the official BTRC website. The jury consisted of Alexander Tikhanovich (chairman of the jury, singer), Vasily Rainchik (musician/composer), Olga Schlager (national final project manager), Olga Salamakha (deputy director of the TV channel Belarus 24), Marianna Nikolayeva (head of the department of arts at the Belarusian Ministry of Culture), Elena Treshchinskaya (head of the radio station "Radius FM"), Olga Ryzhikova (television host), Evgeny Perlin (television host), Alexander Mezhenny (director of the Shtam dance school), Sergei Andrianov (journalist), Olga Drozdova (producer, singer, and vocal coach), Ekaterina Samsonova (radio presenter), Dmitry Sankovich (radio presenter), Gunesh (singer), Iskui Abalyan (singer), Sasha Nemo (singer), Dmitry Koldun (singer, represented Belarus at Eurovision in 2007), Alyona Lanskaya (singer, represented Belarus at Eurovision in 2013) and Teo (singer, represented Belarus at Eurovision in 2014). Ten finalists were selected and announced on 1 December 2015 during BTRC's evening news programme.

The competing entries were presented to the public in the lead up to the national final through televised postcard presentations that aired to promote the show, a weekly review programme that covered the competing artists' preparations and appearances by the ten finalists in the BTRC morning programme Dobrai Ranitsy, Belarus.

==== Final ====
The televised final took place on 22 January 2016 at the "600 Metrov" studio in Minsk, hosted by Olga Ryzhikova and 2014 Belarusian Eurovision contestant Teo. Prior to the competition, a draw for the running order took place on 9 December 2015. Public televoting exclusively selected the song "Help You Fly" performed by Ivan as the winner.

In addition to the performances from the competitors, the show featured guest performances by the hosts Olga Ryzhikova and Teo, 2013 Belarusian Eurovision contestant Alyona Lanskaya, Gunesh, Sasha Nemo and Kattie.

Final – 22 January 2016
R/O	Artist	Song	Songwriter(s)	Televote	Place
1	Alexey Gross	"Flame"	Eugene Oleinik, Julia Bykova, Renee Pozzi	3,202	5
2	Sasha Zakharik	"Glory Night"	Alexandra Zakharik, Mariya Kirdun	727	10
3	Valeriya Sadovskaya	"Not Alone"	Valeriya Sadovskaya, Roman Kolodko	1,322	8
4	Radiovolna	"Radio Wave"	Vlad Chizhikov, Roman Kolodko	805	9
5	The EM	"Turn Around"	Maxim Aleinikov, Alexander Yatsevich, Colé van dais, Roy van der Merwe, Ian Fowell	2,164	7
6	Navi	"Heta ziamlia" (Гэта зямля)	Artyom Lukyanenko, Kseniya Zhuk	5,423	4
7	Ivan	"Help You Fly"	Viktor Drobysh, Alexander Ivanov, Timofei Leontiev, Mary Susan Applegate	23,167	1
8	Anastasiya Malashkevich	"Pray for Love"	Anastasiya Malashkevich, Alexandra Popkovich	2,680	6
9	Kirill Yermakov	"Running to the Sun"	Leonid Shirin, Kirill Yermakov, Natalia Tambovtseva	13,555	3
10	Napoli	"My Universe"	Leonid Shirin, Natalia Tambovtseva	22,399	2

=== Promotion ===
Ivan made several appearances across Europe to specifically promote "Help You Fly" as the Belarusian Eurovision entry. On 6 February, Ivan performed "Help You Fly" during the first semi-final of the Ukrainian Eurovision national final. On 2 April, Ivan performed during the Eurovision PreParty Riga, which was organised by OGAE Latvia and held at the Spikeri Concert Hall in Riga, Latvia. On 3 April, he performed during the Eurovision Pre-Party, which was held at the Izvestia Hall in Moscow, Russia and hosted by Dmitry Guberniev. On 9 April, Ivan performed during the Eurovision in Concert event which was held at the Melkweg venue in Amsterdam, Netherlands and hosted by Cornald Maas and Hera Björk. Between 11 and 13 April, Ivan took part in promotional activities in Tel Aviv, Israel and performed during the Israel Calling event held at the Ha'teatron venue.

== At Eurovision ==
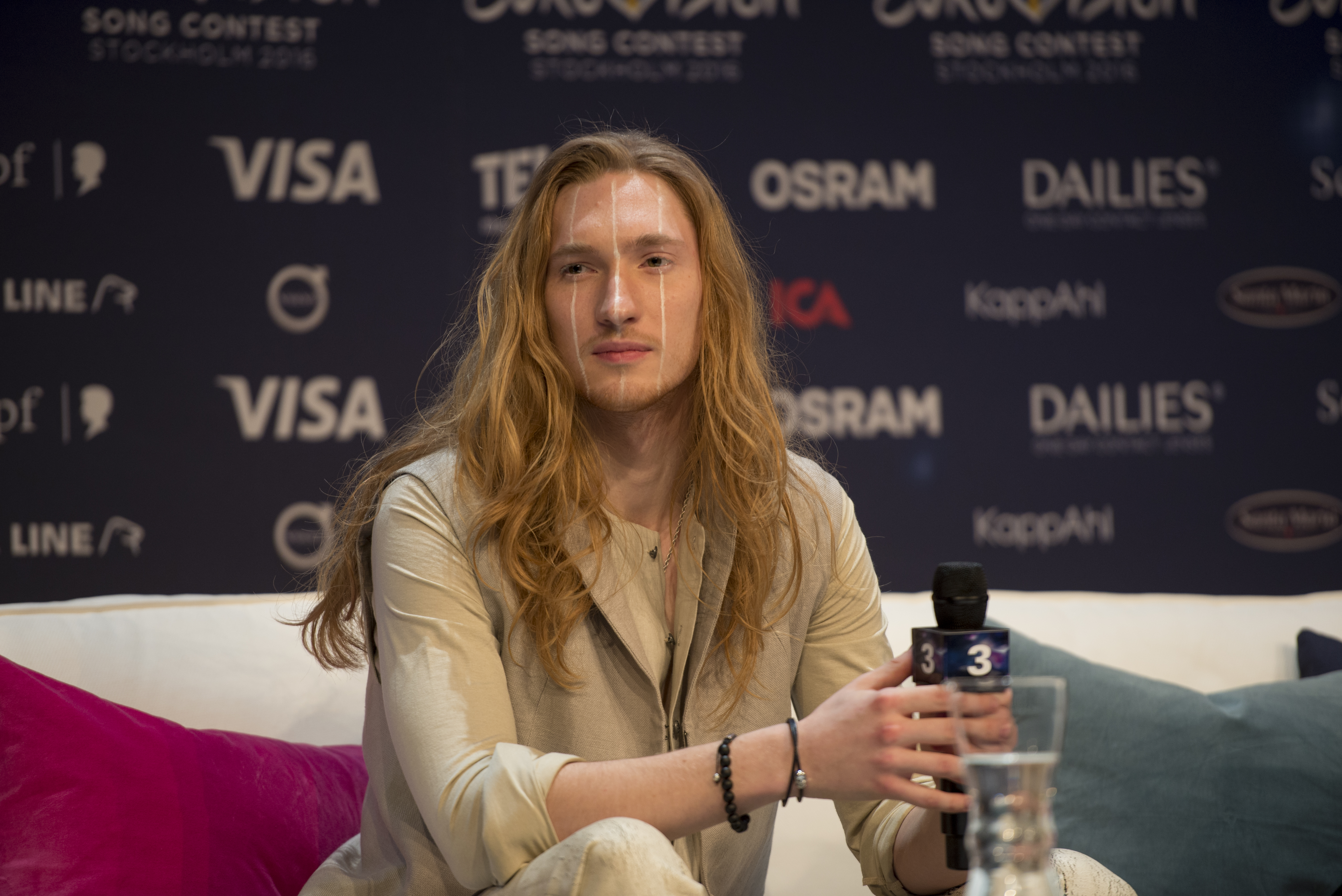
Ivan during a press meet and greet

According to Eurovision rules, all nations with the exceptions of the host country and the "Big Five" (France, Germany, Italy, Spain and the United Kingdom) are required to qualify from one of two semi-finals in order to compete for the final; the top ten countries from each semi-final progress to the final. The European Broadcasting Union (EBU) split up the competing countries into six different pots based on voting patterns from previous contests, with countries with favourable voting histories put into the same pot. On 25 January 2016, a special allocation draw was held which placed each country into one of the two semi-finals, as well as which half of the show they would perform in. Belarus was placed into the second semi-final, to be held on 12 May 2016, and was scheduled to perform in the first half of the show.

Once all the competing songs for the 2016 contest had been released, the running order for the semi-finals was decided by the shows' producers rather than through another draw, so that similar songs were not placed next to each other. Belarus was set to perform in position 5, following the entry from Israel and before the entry from Serbia.

The two semi-finals and the final were broadcast in Belarus on Belarus 1 and Belarus 24 with commentary by Evgeny Perlin. The Belarusian spokesperson, who announce the top 12-point score awarded by the Belarusian jury during the final, was 2015 Belarusian representative Uzari.

=== Semi-final ===
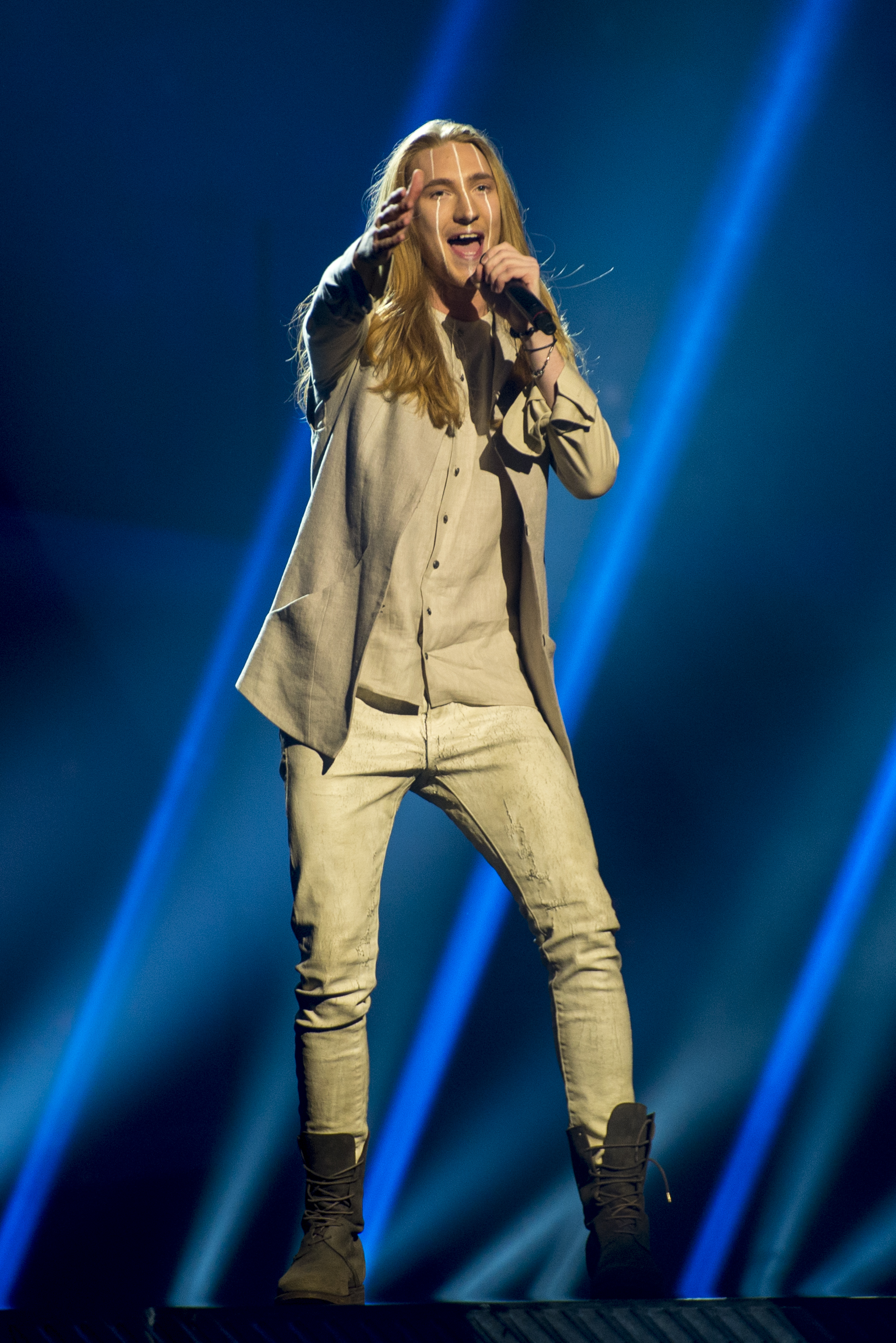
Ivan during a rehearsal before the second semi-final

Ivan took part in technical rehearsals on 4 and 7 May, followed by dress rehearsals on 11 and 12 May. This included the jury show on 11 May where the professional juries of each country watched and voted on the competing entries.

The Belarusian performance featured Ivan performing on stage alone wearing a beige outfit with a transparent screen prop that displays holograms of a nude image of Ivan, wolves, people and musicians playing instruments. The stage colours transitioned between blue and red with the LED screens displaying landscapes and wolves. Ivan was joined by five off-stage backing vocalists: Anna Linnéa Isbäck, Herman Gardarfve, Jimmy Claeson, Melanie My Rosas and Ksenia Pavroz.

At the end of the show, Belarus was not announced among the top 10 entries in the second semi-final and therefore failed to qualify to compete in the final. It was later revealed that Belarus placed twelfth in the semi-final, receiving a total of 84 points: 52 points from the televoting and 32 points from the juries.

=== Voting ===
Voting during the three shows was conducted under a new system that involved each country now awarding two sets of points from 1-8, 10 and 12: one from their professional jury and the other from televoting. Each nation's jury consisted of five music industry professionals who are citizens of the country they represent, with their names published before the contest to ensure transparency. This jury judged each entry based on: vocal capacity; the stage performance; the song's composition and originality; and the overall impression by the act. In addition, no member of a national jury was permitted to be related in any way to any of the competing acts in such a way that they cannot vote impartially and independently. The individual rankings of each jury member as well as the nation's televoting results were released shortly after the grand final.

Below is a breakdown of points awarded to Belarus and awarded by Belarus in the second semi-final and grand final of the contest, and the breakdown of the jury voting and televoting conducted during the two shows:

==== Points awarded to Belarus ====
Points awarded to Belarus (Semi-final 2)
Score	Televote	Jury
12 points		
10 points	Ukraine	
8 points	Poland	
7 points	Latvia	
6 points	Georgia; Lithuania	Australia; Bulgaria
5 points	Serbia	Ukraine
4 points	Bulgaria	Poland
3 points	Israel	United Kingdom
2 points		Germany; Ireland; Slovenia
1 point	Denmark; Ireland; Italy	Latvia; Switzerland

==== Points awarded by Belarus ====
Points awarded by Belarus (Semi-final 2)
Score	Televote	Jury
12 points	Ukraine	Belgium
10 points	Lithuania	Lithuania
8 points	Bulgaria	Australia
7 points	Australia	Ukraine
6 points	Poland	Norway
5 points	Latvia	Serbia
4 points	Belgium	Bulgaria
3 points	Norway	Denmark
2 points	Georgia	Georgia
1 point	Israel	Israel

Points awarded by Belarus (Final)
Score	Televote	Jury
12 points	Russia	Russia
10 points	Ukraine	Lithuania
8 points	Azerbaijan	Sweden
7 points	Armenia	Ukraine
6 points	Poland	Australia
5 points	Latvia	Malta
4 points	Bulgaria	Belgium
3 points	Hungary	Armenia
2 points	Sweden	Azerbaijan
1 point	Australia	Bulgaria

==== Detailed voting results ====
The following members comprised the Belarusian jury:

- Yuriy Vashchuk (Teo; jury chairperson) – singer, composer, represented Belarus in the 2014 contest
- Alexander Kapyonkin – Head of ODL Television Program BelMuzTV
- Gennady Markevich – composer
- Olga Plotnikova – singer
- Olga Drozdova – vocal producer

Detailed voting results from Belarus (Semi-final 2)
R/O	Country	Jury							Televote	
R/O	Country	Teo	A. Kapyonkin	G. Markevich	O. Plotnikova	O. Drozdova	Rank	Points	Rank	Points
01	Latvia	14	11	11	11	13	12		6	5
02	Poland	13	10	13	13	14	13		5	6
03	Switzerland	10	16	16	12	12	15		15	
04	Israel	11	12	12	10	7	10	1	10	1
05	Belarus									
06	Serbia	6	9	10	6	5	6	5	11	
07	Ireland	15	14	9	15	15	16		14	
08	Macedonia	17	17	15	16	16	17		17	
09	Lithuania	1	2	2	3	3	2	10	2	10
10	Australia	4	1	1	2	4	3	8	4	7
11	Slovenia	16	4	14	14	17	14		13	
12	Bulgaria	5	13	7	8	6	7	4	3	8
13	Denmark	8	15	6	5	9	8	3	12	
14	Ukraine	3	6	4	4	2	4	7	1	12
15	Norway	7	8	5	7	8	5	6	8	3
16	Georgia	9	5	8	17	10	9	2	9	2
17	Albania	12	7	17	9	11	11		16	
18	Belgium	2	3	3	1	1	1	12	7	4

Detailed voting results from Belarus (Final)
R/O	Country	Jury							Televote	
R/O	Country	Teo	A. Kapyonkin	G. Markevich	O. Plotnikova	O. Drozdova	Rank	Points	Rank	Points
01	Belgium	10	7	7	4	9	7	4	18	
02	Czech Republic	22	24	17	16	19	20		25	
03	Netherlands	12	11	6	12	18	11		21	
04	Azerbaijan	13	12	12	11	8	9	2	3	8
05	Hungary	7	25	18	6	10	13		8	3
06	Italy	23	10	23	24	17	19		19	
07	Israel	11	23	22	13	12	16		16	
08	Bulgaria	8	9	13	17	11	10	1	7	4
09	Sweden	3	3	3	5	3	3	8	9	2
10	Germany	25	19	24	19	21	23		20	
11	France	19	20	19	20	14	18		14	
12	Poland	16	21	5	9	22	14		5	6
13	Australia	9	4	8	2	7	5	6	10	1
14	Cyprus	14	15	14	22	23	17		11	
15	Serbia	20	22	21	21	16	22		24	
16	Lithuania	2	8	1	1	4	2	10	12	
17	Croatia	17	16	26	14	25	21		23	
18	Russia	1	1	2	3	2	1	12	1	12
19	Spain	15	5	10	18	15	12		17	
20	Latvia	21	17	25	23	24	24		6	5
21	Ukraine	4	6	4	7	1	4	7	2	10
22	Malta	6	2	9	8	6	6	5	22	
23	Georgia	18	18	11	15	13	15		15	
24	Austria	26	13	20	26	26	26		13	
25	United Kingdom	24	26	15	25	20	25		26	
26	Armenia	5	14	16	10	5	8	3	4	7
