= Alexander Ivanov (singer) =

Belarusian-Russian singer (born 1994)

Alexander Ivanov: Александр Иванов (Russian); Аляксандр Іваноў (Belarusian)
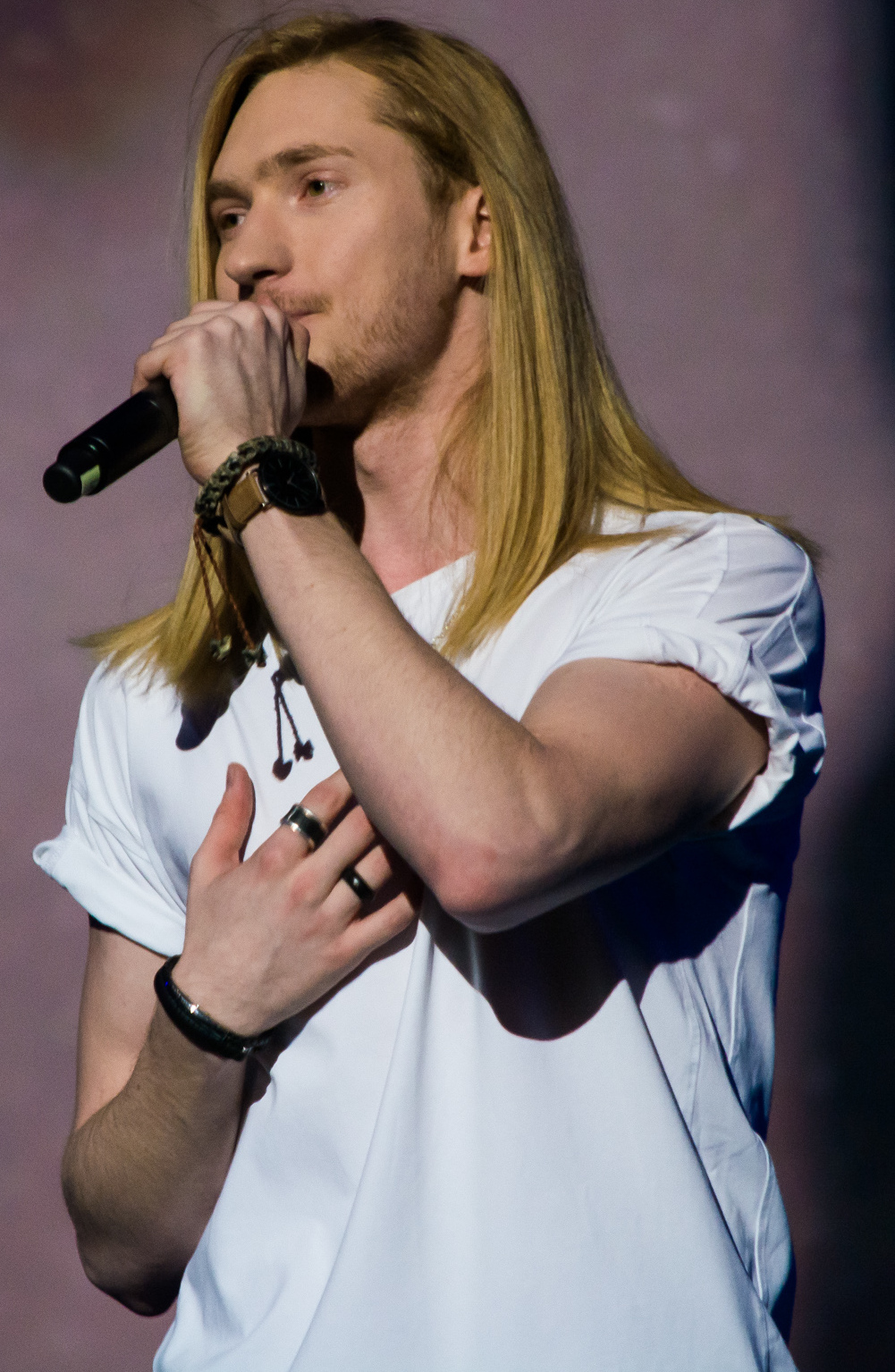
- Ivanov in 2017

Background information
- Also known as: Ivan; Sasha Ivanov
- Born: 29 October 1994 (age 32); Gomel, Belarus
- Occupation: Singer
- Years active: 2009–present

Alexander Ivanov (Note: Russian: Александр Иванов, IPA: [ɐlʲɪkˈsandr ɪvɐˈnof]; Belarusian: Аляксандр Іваноў, łacinka: Alaksandar Ivanoŭ) (born 29 October 1994), also known mononymously as Ivan, is a Belarusian-Russian singer. He represented Belarus in the Eurovision Song Contest 2016 with the song "Help You Fly". Ivanov was also to represent Russia in the Intervision Song Contest 2015 but the contest never happened.

== Eurovision 2016 ==
It was reported in the Belarusian media that Ivanov intended to perform his entry naked with two wolves on stage. His producer tried to get permission to get wolves on stage, considering the "no live animals" policy of the competition. Organizers didn't allow either request, but the presentation included animated scenes of wolves appearing on screen. Ivanov performed his song "Help You Fly" on 12 May 2016 in Eurovision's second semi-final, but failed to qualify to the 14 May 2016 final.

=== 2023: Маска (The Masked Singer) ===
Beginning on February 12, 2023, Alexander Ivanov appeared on the weekly television show Маска (The Masked Singer) on the Russian NTV channel. He sang under the Caterpillar mask. He was eliminated as a contestant on the April 23rd, 2023 show, and he removed his Caterpillar mask to reveal his true identity. He then performed a reprise of his song Le Temps des cathédrales from episode 3 of Маска (The Masked Singer) show.

Performances on Маска (The Masked Singer)
Broadcast date	Title	Language	Songwriters	Original Artist
February 12, 2023	"Букет"	Russian	Alexander Barykin	Alexander Barykin
February 19, 2023	"Песня Забавы"	Russian	Flying Ship	Tatyana Shabelnikova
February 26, 2023	"Le Temps des cathédrales"	French	Notre-Dame De Paris	OST Notre-Dame De Paris
March 5, 2023	"Трава у дома"	Russian	Zemlyane	Zemlyane
March 12, 2023	"Мой первый день"	Russian	Olga Kormukhina	Olga Kormukhina
March 19, 2023	"Полёт на дельтаплане"	Russian	Valery Leontiev	Valery Leontiev
March 26, 2023	"Колыбельная"	Russian	Polina Gagarina	Polina Gagarina
April 2, 2023	"Billie Jean"	English	Michael Jackson	Michael Jackson
April 9, 2023	"О чём ты думаешь"	Russian	Alexey Vorobyov	Alexey Vorobyov
April 16, 2023	"Somebody to Love"	English	Freddie Mercury	Queen
April 23, 2023	"Аэропорты"	Russian	Leonid Agutin & Vladimir Presnyakov	Leonid Agutin & Vladimir Presnyakov

== Personal life ==
His great-grandmother was Moldovan.

== Discography ==
=== Singles ===
Title	Year	Peak chart positions	Album
Title	Year	RUS	Album
"Krest I Ladon"	2015		
"Help You Fly"	2016	200	Non-album singles

== Notes ==
Awards and achievements
Preceded by Uzari & Maimuna with "Time"	Belarus in the Eurovision Song Contest; 2016	Succeeded by Naviband with "Story of My Life"
