= Michael James Down =

- Also known as: Michael James
- Born: 15 July 1988 (age 38); Belfast, Northern Ireland
- Genre: Pop
- Years active: 2011 –

Michael James Down is a songwriter from Belfast, Northern Ireland. He is best known as a composer and lyricist of several pop songs performed by other artists, many of them in national pre-selections of the Eurovision Song Contest. He has worked with American popstar/rapper Sean Paul, the Japanese girlgroup MAX and in 2018 it was revealed that he'd written six of the songs for Russian pop star Sergey Lazarev's album 'The One' which charted at number 1 in Russia.

== Discography ==
=== Entries in the Junior Eurovision Song Contest ===
- "Señorita" by Carlos Higes, Spain, (Junior Eurovision Song Contest 2022), 6th place

=== Entries in national Eurovision pre-selections ===
2012

- "This Must Be Love" by Ana Mardare (Romania 2012), 13th place

2013

- "Meðal Andanna" by Birgitta Haukdal (Iceland 2013), 3rd place
- "Hullócsillag" by Mónika Hoffmann (Hungary 2013), eliminated (semi-final)
- "I Need a Hero" by Samanta Tina (Latvia 2013), 2nd place
- "One" by Niko (Latvia 2013), 6th place
- "Paralyzed" by Andrei Leonte (Romania 2013), 12th place in final
- "I Believe in Love" by Diana Hetea (Romania 2013), 12th place (semi-final)
- "Runaways" by Boris Covali (Moldova 2013), 2nd place
- "Freaky Thong" by Nicoleta Gavriliţă (Moldova 2013), 6th place
- "A Brighter Day" by Tatiana Heghea (Moldova 2013), 8th place
- "Celebrate" by Cristina V. & Glam Girls (Moldova 2013), 12th place
- "Coma" by Margarita Ciorici (Moldova 2013), eliminated (semi-final)
- "In My Head" by Alexandru Şendrea (Moldova 2013), eliminated (semi-final)

2014

- 'It's Not Impossible" by Michael James (Switzerland SRF internet candidates 2014), did not qualify
- "Somebody Like You" by Daria Kinzer (Switzerland SRF internet candidates 2014), did not qualify
- "My Little Honey Bee" by Dennis Fagerström (Finland 2014), eliminated (semi-final)
- "Love Will Take Me Home" by Franklin Calleja (Malta 2014), 7th place
- "Waterfall" by Joni (Hungary 2014), eliminated (semi-final)

2015

- "Boom!" by Michael James (Switzerland RTS qualifiers 2015), did not qualify

2016

- "Wrong Answers" by Michael James (Switzerland SRF internet candidates 2016), did not quality
- "Alive" by Jasmine Abela (Malta 2016), 6th place
- "All Around the World" by Deborah C (Malta 2016), 11th place
- "United" by Rūta Ščiogolevaitė (Lithuania 2016), 3rd place
- "Good Enough" by Annica Milán & Kimmo Blom (Finland 2016), 5th place
- "Don't Wake Me Up" by Tuuli Okkonen (Finland 2016), 9th place

2017

- "Let's Come Together" by NAPOLI (Belarus 2017), Joint 4th place
- "Tonight" by Deborah C & Josef Tabone (Malta 2017), 7th place
- "Sacrifice" by Mia (Lithuania 2017), 5th place (quarter-final)
- "Þú hefur dáleitt mig"/"Hypnotised" by Aron Brink (Iceland 2017), 4th place
- "I Won't Surrender" by MIHAI (Romania 2017), 2nd place

2018

- "Back to Life" by Eleanor Cassar (Malta 2018), 5th place
- "Devoted" by Johnny Bădulescu (Romania 2018), 4th place (semi-final)
- "Try" by Xandra (Romania 2018), 9th place
- "Heaven" by MIHAI (Romania 2018), 7th place
- "Somebody to Love" by Manuel Chivari (Romania 2018), 7th place (semi-final)
- "Chasing Rushes" by NAPOLI (Belarus 2018), Joint 4th place
- "Dišem" by Nina Petković (Montenegro 2018), 5th place
- "Powerful" by Donata Virbilaitė (Lithuania 2018), 12th place (quarter-final)
- "Alien" by Felicia Dunaf (Moldova 2018), 8th place
- "Aldrei gefast upp"/"Battleline" by Fókus (Iceland 2018), 5th place

2019

- "Ja sam ti san" by Andrea Demirović (Montenegro 2019), 3rd place
- "Weight of the World" by Nicola (Romania 2019), eliminated (semi-final)
- "Underground" by Vaida (Romania 2019), 6th place
- "I Will Not Surrender" by Maxim Zavidia (Moldova 2019), 2nd place

2020

- "Don't Let Me Down" by NAPOLI (Belarus 2020), 9th place

2022

- "Do svidaniya" by ARIS (Romania 2022), eliminated (semi-final)
- "Washing Machine" by Queens of Roses (Lithuania 2022), 8th place

2023

- "Love You Like That" by Jake (Malta 2023), eliminated (quarter-final)
- "Haunted" by Lyndsay (Malta 2023), eliminated (quarter-final)
- "Love Again" by Skrellex (Norway 2023), 7th place

2025

- "Frelsið Mitt"/"Set Me Free" by Stebbi Jak (Iceland 2025), 2nd place

2026

- "Into the Wild" by Skrellex (Norway 2026), 7th place

=== Other notable songs ===
- "Tamagotchi" by Samra
- "Sose add fel!" by Agárdi Szilvia
- "Un craicun fericit" by Amna & Klyde
- "Unexpected" by Fabrizio Faniello
- "Heartbreaker" by MAX
- "Me Anticipo" by La Pelopony
- "OMG" by La Pelopony
- "I want your love" by La Pelopony
- "Desastres de un capítulo final" by La Pelopony
- "Caliente" by La Pelopony
- "Llegará el día" by Yeyo feat. La Pelopony
- "Invencible" by Yeyo
- "Soy lo que soy" by Yeyo
- "Baya" by Mihai Traistariu
- "Hey boy (Why do I bother?) by TWiiNS feat. Sean Paul
- "Latino Love" by TWiiNS
- "Que me gusta" by TWiiNS
- "Doigralis" by Sergey Lazarev
- "Eat you up" by Sergey Lazarev
- "Going under" by Sergey Lazarev
- "Deep blue" by Sergey Lazarev
- "Popolam" by Sergey Lazarev
- "Flying" by Sergey Lazarev
- "Freaky tonight" by Sergey Lazarev
- "Not worth it anymore" by Sergey Lazarev
- "Mozhet" by Sergey Lazarev
- "Vlyublennye" by Sergey Lazarev
- "Basta ya" by Supremme de Luxe
- "Candy shop" by Supremme de Luxe
- "Gettin High" by Supremme de Luxe
- "EnerG" by Supremme de Luxe
- "High on your love" by Safura
- "Private Suite" by Henrik Fuglem
- "Go!" by Clodie
- "Take me as I am" by Annica Milán & Kimmo Blom
- "Fabulosa B!tch" by Diva Houston
- "Take a Hike" by Jiyeon
- "All or Nothing" by 吉克雋逸 Jike Junyi
- "A Little Bit" by Youth With You
- "My Body" by NADA
- "Carry Me Home" by Lost Witness & Laura-Ly
- "So Bossy" by Bossy Girl
- "雷妮遊戲 (Renee's Game)" by GEmma Wu
- "Weight of The World" by Lost Witness & Laura-Ly
- "Eyes For You" by He Junlin
- "Shake This Dress Away" by He Skrellex
