= Naviband =

Belarusian band

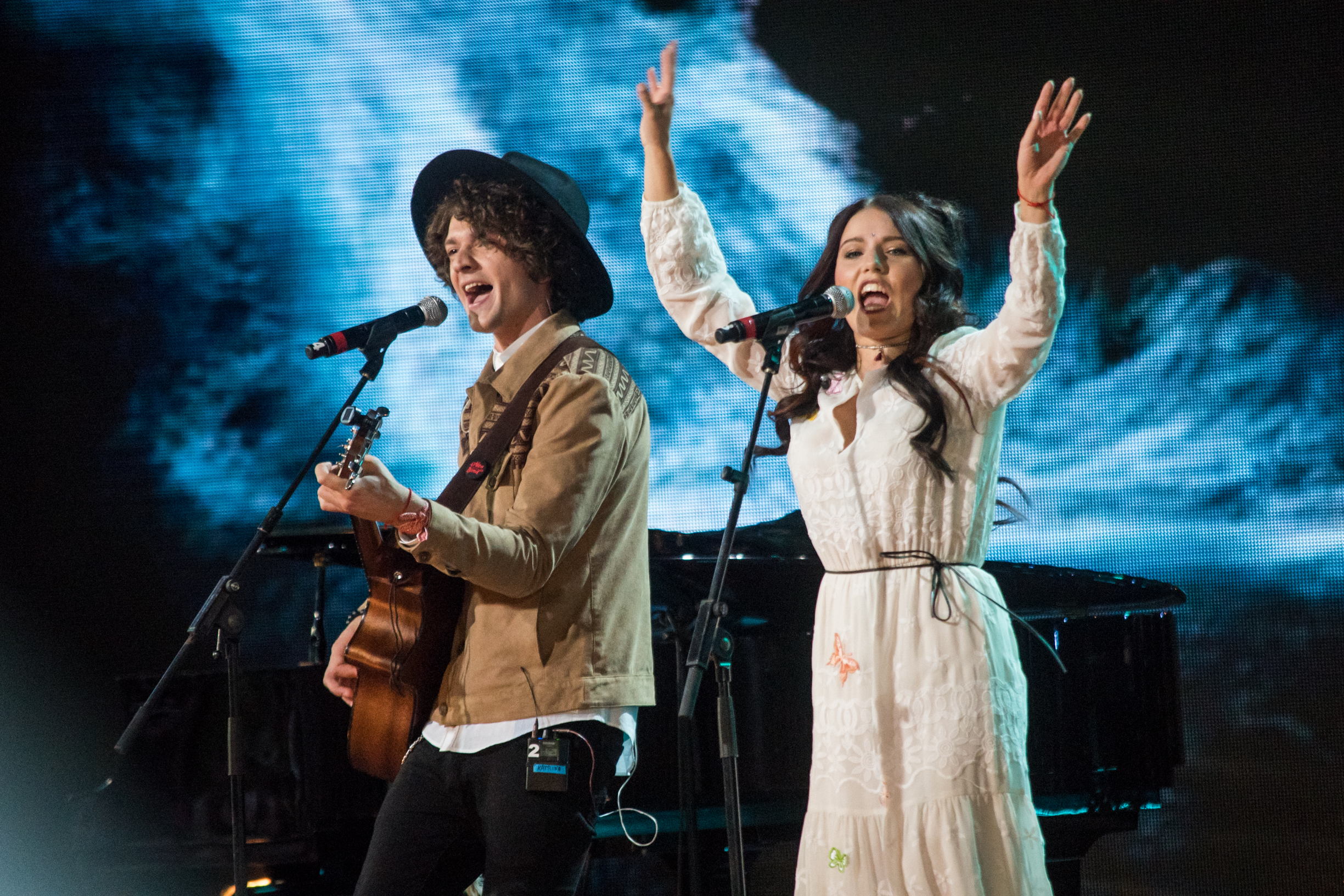
- Naviband performing in Jurmala in 2017

Background information
- Also known as: NAVI
- Origin: Minsk, Belarus
- Genres: Indie rock; indie pop; indie folk; folk rock; acoustic rock
- Years active: 2013–present
- Members: Artsiom Lukyanenka; Kseniya Zhuk; Aliaksandr Tabolski; Yaroslav Tomilo

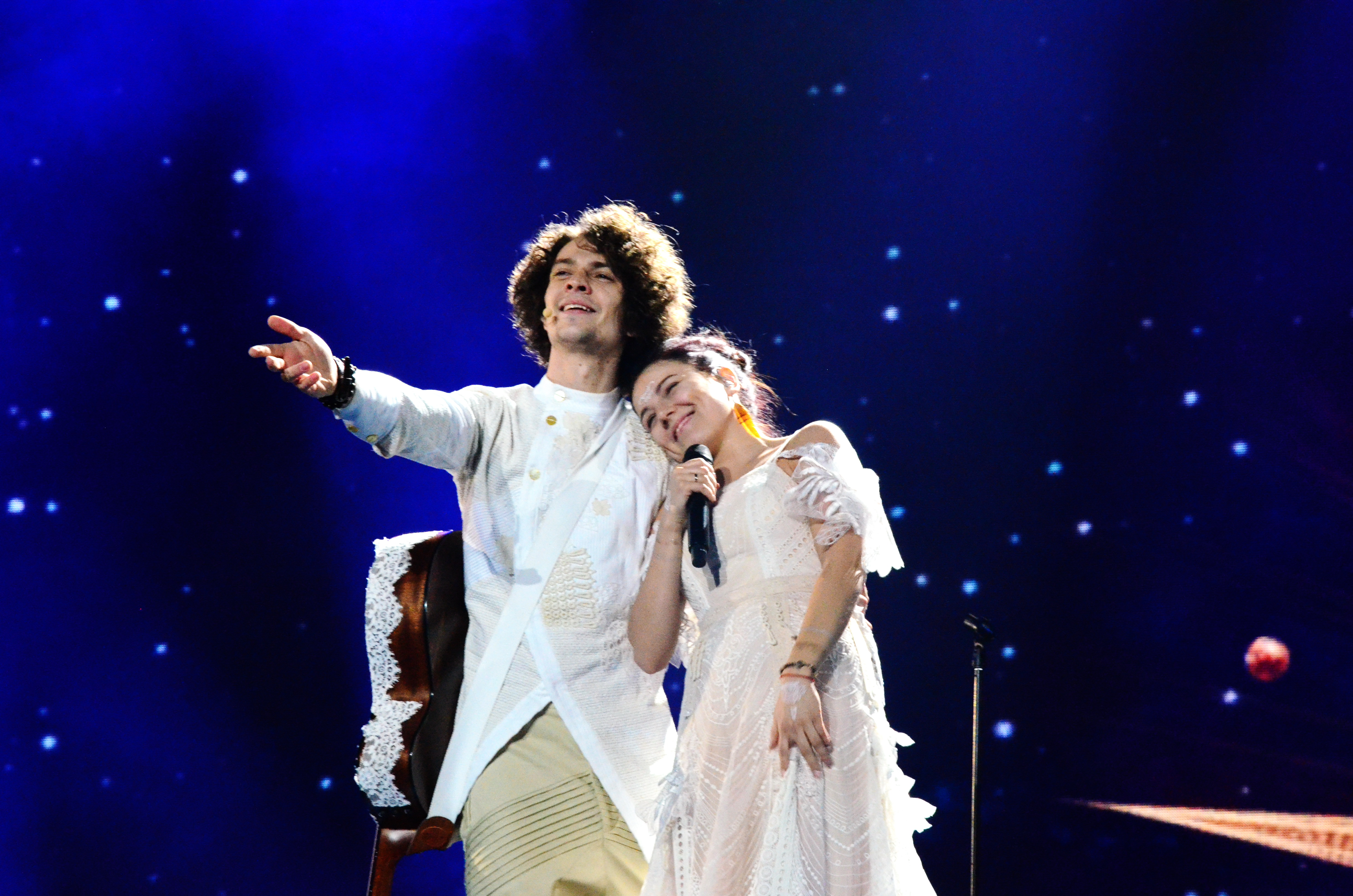
NaviBand at Eurovision Song Contest 2017

Naviband (stylised as NAVIBAND, until late 2016 also called NAVI) is a Belarusian indie folk band. The band was founded as a duo between singer/songwriter and guitar player Artsiom Lukyanenka and singer/songwriter Kseniya Zhuk (Lukyanenka), later also featured guitar player, producer Aliaksandr Tabolski, bass - Uladzislaŭ Čaščavik, drums - Uladzimir Beher, Yaroslav Tomilo as a sound engineer and manager. Originally founded in Minsk, they have been based in Warsaw since 2020.

The band rose to fame with a primarily Belarusian-language repertoire, but have also performed several songs in Ukrainian. Their first song "Abdymi myane" became a hit in their native Belarus. This was followed by their debut album Lovi, released in 2014. Afterwards, the band made multiple attempts to represent Belarus at the Eurovision Song Contest. Eventually, Naviband represented Belarus in the Eurovision Song Contest 2017 with the song "Historyja majho žyccia" finishing in 17th place, their country's fourth-best result.

== History ==
=== 2013-2014: "Abdymi miane", first albums and first Eurovision attempts ===
Naviband was formed as a duo in 2013 in Minsk by journalism student Artsiom Lukyanienka and music student Kseniya Zhuk. Their first project was the song "Abdymi miane", which was released in the summer of 2013. The song immediately became a radio hit in Belarus leading to the beginning of the duo's career. Artiom and Kseniya were married on the 5th of September 2014. The duo did its first attempt to represent Belarus at the Eurovision Song Contest with its first and only song in English until 2021, but did not advance the audition rounds.

In early 2014, Naviband released their first album Lovi, containing songs in Belarusian and Russian. Their first album and songs received positive responses from Russian, and Ukrainian popular musicians, including Diana Arbenina and Sergei Babkin.

The group's releases gained popularity, leading to their first concerts in Minsk, Hrodna and Homiel and performed at a Christmas concert at the Bolshoi Theater in Moscow.

The duet auditioned for the Belarusian selection for Eurovision 2015 in December 2014. They presented the Belarusian-language song "Vyberu sam", but did not advance to the final of the selection. A few weeks later, the group released their second album, Soncam sahretyja, with songs solely in Belarusian.

=== 2015-2016: Becoming a band, "Heta zyamlya" and rise to popularity in Belarus ===
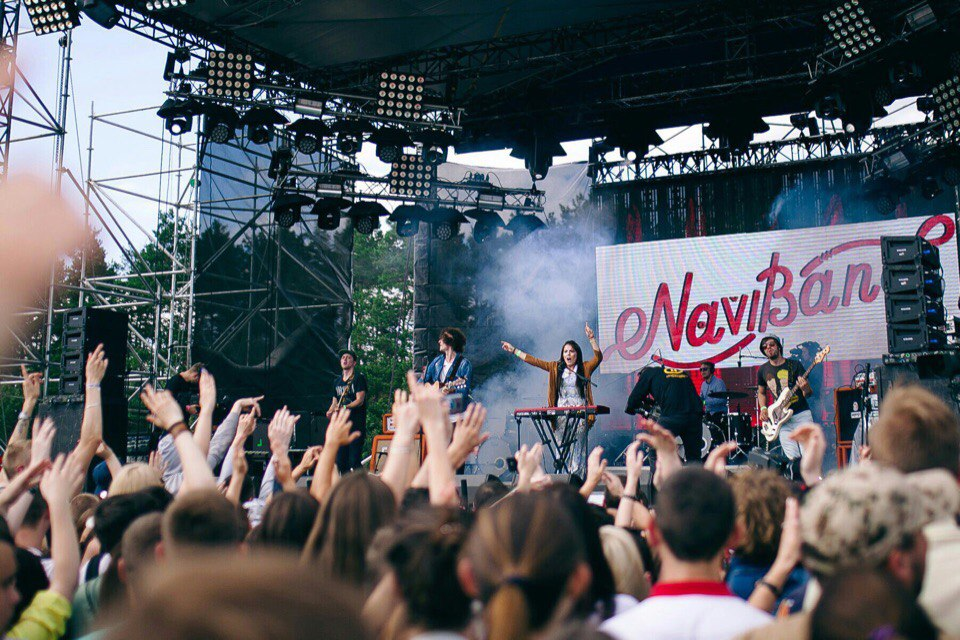
Naviband at Rock za Bobrov Festival

In January 2015, NaviBand won the Belarusian music prize Lira for "Best Song in Belarusian Language" for their single "Abdymi miane". Not much later, Artsiom and Kseniya were joined by Aliaksandr Tabolski (producer, electric guitar player), Uladzislaŭ Čaščavik (bass), and Uladzimir Beher (drums), Yaroslav Tomilo (sound engineer) ...and began turning the duet into a band.

In recognition of their rising popularity, Naviband was invited as a participant at one of the concerts at the Slavianski Bazaar in Vitebsk. In addition to solo performances in Belarusian cities, the group also held solo concerts in Prague, Warsaw, Kiyev and performed at the Wild Mint Festival and Bardauskaja Vosień. In September 2015, the group won the competitive part of the Basowiszcza festival of Belarusian rock music.

In November 2015, Naviband released the single "Heta Ziamlya" (This land), which went to the finals of the national selection for the Eurovision Song Contest-2016. In February 2016, Naviband was announced as a participant in the Belarusian selection with the song "Heta Ziamlya". They eventually placed fourth in the national final.

February 14, 2016, sold-out solo concert in Minsk club Re:Public. A recording of that concert was released as a live album later that year. In June, they met English singer and actress Joss Stone in Minsk, singing "Abdymi miane". In July 2016, Naviband performed "Nash motiv" as a duet during the Slavianski Bazaar concert Vitebsk gathers friends.

At the end of 2016, Naviband again declared their desire to represent Belarus at the Eurovision Song Contest-2017.

=== 2017-2018: Eurovision Song Contest 2017, Iliuminacyja and Adnoj darohaj ===
On 20 January 2017, Naviband again took part in the Belarusian Eurovision selection with the song "Historyja Majho žyccia" (The Story of My Life). The same day the third album of the band was released, it was called Iliuminacyja.

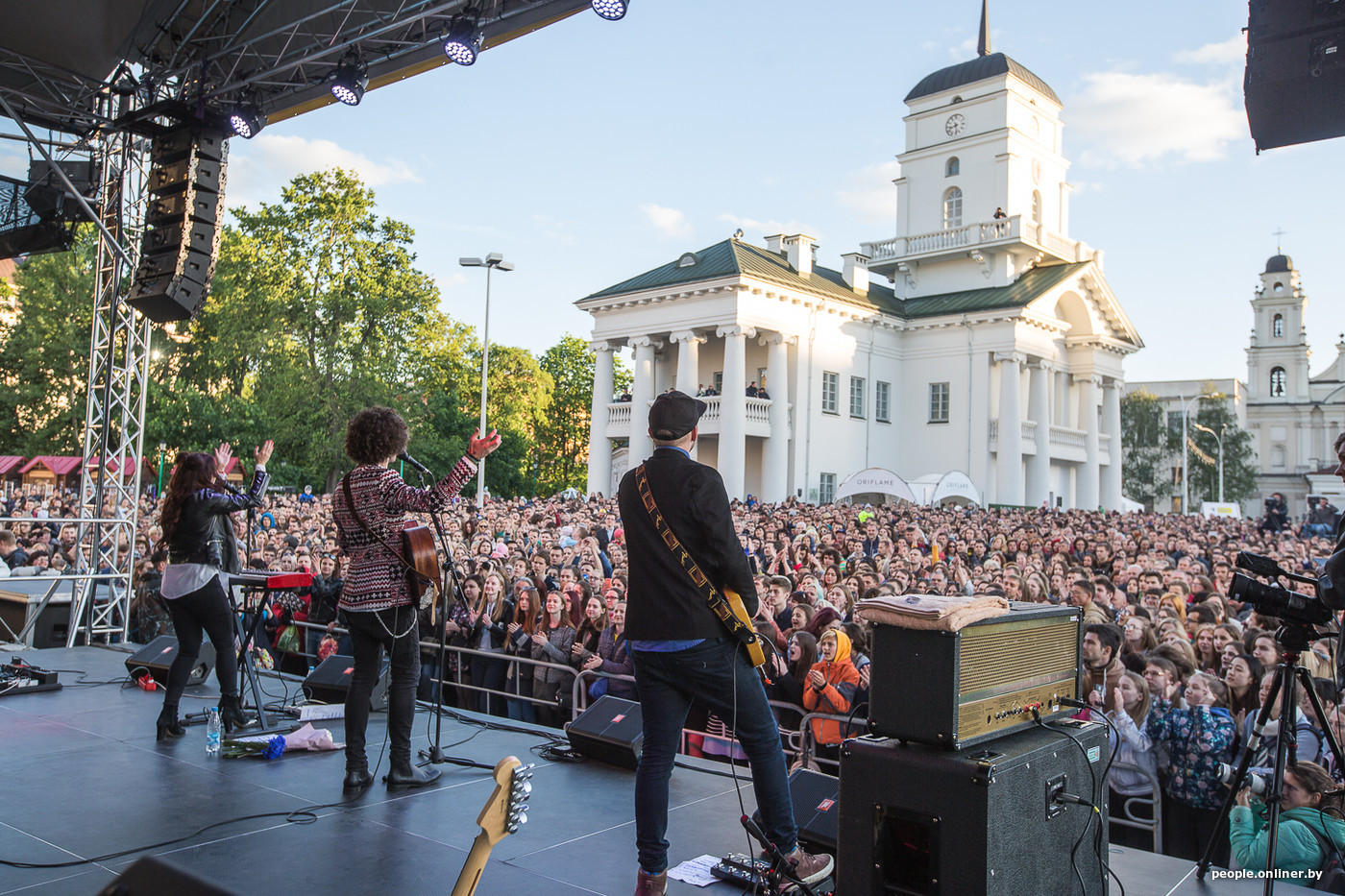
3 June 2017, Naviband concert in Minsk

In the final of the national selection, Naviband won first place, earning the opportunity to represent Belarus at the Eurovision Song Contest 2017 in Kyiv in May 2017. They made history by being the first participants to perform in the Belarusian language.

In February 2017, their Eurovision song was chosen as "Best Belarusian Song" at the second Lira Awards. Meanwhile, the group performed at "Vidbir", the Ukrainian national selection for Eurovision 2017. Their surprise Belarusian cover of Jamala's 1944 created a large public resonance in Ukraine and the group was told by Konstantin Meladze that Ukraine would probably give Belarus the maximum result.

After the draw, it became known that Naviband will perform in the second semifinal on 11 May. Based on the voting results on May 11, the group reached the final of the competition, where it performed third in the running order. In the final, Naviband scored 83 points, receiving a maximum of 24 points from Ukraine, finishing in 17th place. Naviband's performance aroused great resonance and extremely positive public reaction in Belarus as the group managed to achieve the country's fourth-best result and the second-best points-wise in Belarusian history.

On 3 June 2017, about ten thousand people came to the Naviband performance near the Minsk City Hall. A live performance on July 3, near Stella's "Minsk - Hero City", was broadcast by All-National TV.

On December 4, 2017, the song "A dzie žyvieš ty?" was released, accompanied by the announcement in the music video that Artsiom and Kseniya were expecting a baby. Four days later, Naviband released their fourth album Adnoj Darohaj. From the first day it took the first line of the charts of Belarusian iTunes and Google Play Music. All the songs on the album are written in Belarusian language.

On February 16, 2018, they performed "Historyja Majho žyccia" and "A dzie žyvieš ty?" at the Belarusian selection for the Eurovision Song Contest 2018. On March 1, 2018, Ksienija announced on her Instagram that they were expecting a son. Their son Matsei was born on 1 May 2018.

In late 2018, the band performed their first Ukrainian-language track, "Sumne more" (Sad sea) .

=== 2019-present: NaviBand and social activism ===
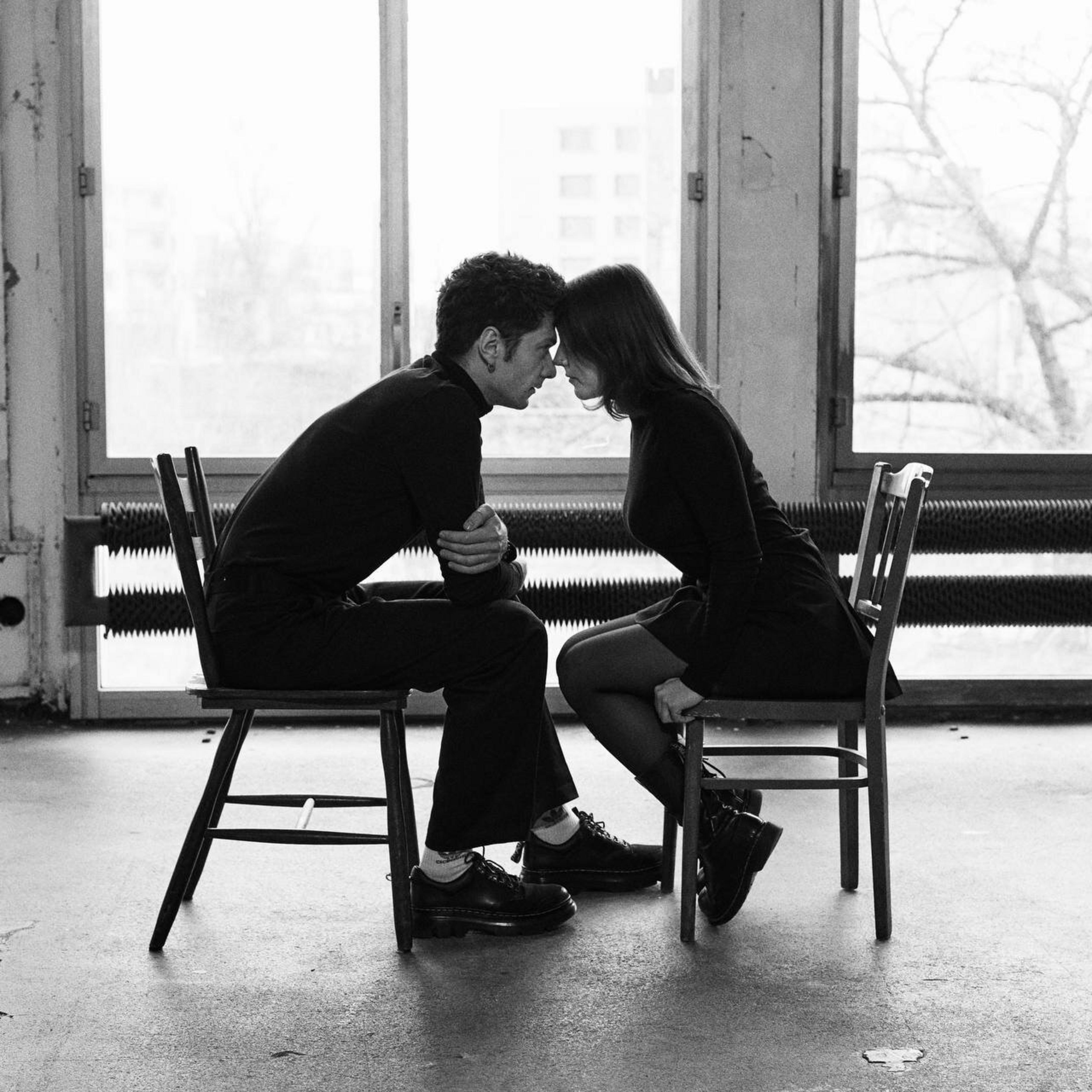
Naviband at the set of the "Prabach" video

NAVIBAND recorded their eponymous fifth album in Kyiv, Ukraine, with the help of crowdfunding. NaviBand was released on 5 December 2019. From the album, two singles were released: "Galileo (Dva cheloveka)" and "Odin iz nas".

In June 2020, the group released "Inshymi". During the 2020 Belarusian protests, the song was frequently used and was named by Meduza.io as one of the songs that described the protests. The band also performed the song on the streets during one of the protests. Subsequently, the group released "Devochka v belom" in September 2020, which was dedicated to female protesters. The group continued their social activism with the song "Milliony bol'shikh serdets", which was also dedicated to the protest.

The group spoke out their support to remove Belarus from the Eurovision Song Contest 2021, which eventually happened in March 2021. In the follow-up of the protests, Naviband claimed that their songs were not allowed to be played anymore at student singing competitions.

Since 2021, Naviband has been living in Europe and touring around. Starting in 2021, Artsiom and Kseniya have been performing as a trio with Aliaksandr Tabolski all over Europe. Their fifth album is set to be released in the fall of 2024.

In 2025, Naviband's social media pages were added to the Belarusian list of extremist materials.

== Members ==
- Artsiom Lukyanenka – singer/songwriter, guitar – born 13 August 1992 (age 34) in Hlybokaye, Vitebsk Region.
- Kseniya Zhuk – singer/songwriter, keyboard – born 21 December 1991 (age 34) in Minsk.
- Aliaksandr Tabolski – producer, electric guitar. During one of the protests of the 2020-2021 Belarusian protests, Taboĺski was arrested and spent one night in prison.
- Yaroslav Tomilo - sound engineer, manager
- Uladzislaŭ Čaščavik – bass
- Uladzimir Biehier – drums

== Discography ==
=== Studio albums ===
Title	Details
Lovi	Released: 15 January 2014; Label: MediaCube Music; Format: Digital download, CD
Soncam sahretyja	Released: 15 December 2014; Label: MediaCube Music; Format: Digital download, CD
Iliuminacyja	Released: 20 January 2017; Label: MediaCube Music; Format: Digital download, CD
Adnoj darohaj	Released: 8 December 2017; Label: MediaCube Music; Format: Digital download, CD
NaviBand	Released: 5 December 2019; Label: MediaCube Music; Format: Digital download, CD

=== Live albums ===
Title	Details
Live from Minsk 14.02.2016	Released: 14 February 2016; Label: MediaCube Music; Format: Digital download, CD

=== Singles ===
Title	Year	Album
"Abdymi myane" (Give Me a Hug)	2013	Non-album singles
"Heta ziamlia" (This land)	2015	Non-album singles
"Kolybelnaya" (Lullaby)	2016	Non-album singles
"Historyja majho žyccia" (Story of my life)	2017	Iliuminacyja
"Biažy" (Run)	2017	Iliuminacyja
"A dzie žyvieš ty?" (And where do you live?)	2017	Adnoj darohaj
"Molodost' v karmane" (Youth in a pocket)	2018	Non-album singles
"Sumne more" (Sad sea)	2018	Non-album singles
"Galileo (Dva cheloveka)" (Galileo (Two people))	2019	NaviBand
"Odin iz nas" (One of us)	2019	NaviBand
"Inshymi" (Others)	2019	Non-album single
"Kupalinka"	2023	Non-album singles
"Prabach" (Forgive me )	2024	Non-album singles
"SOKAL" (FALCON)	2024	Non-album singles

=== Television ===
Title	Year	Notes
Itogi nedeli	2017	Reality series in the run-up to Eurovision 2017

Awards and achievements
Preceded by Ivan with "Help You Fly"	Belarus in the Eurovision Song Contest; 2017	Succeeded by Alekseev with "Forever"
