= Khidry =

Coordinates: 52.1545°N 24.3673°E

- village
- Location within Belarus
- Country: Belarus
- Region: Brest
- District: Kobryn

Khidry is a village in the Brest Voblast of Belarus.

Singer Yuriy Vaschuk was born in Khidry.
