= Maimuna =

Maimuna Маймуна
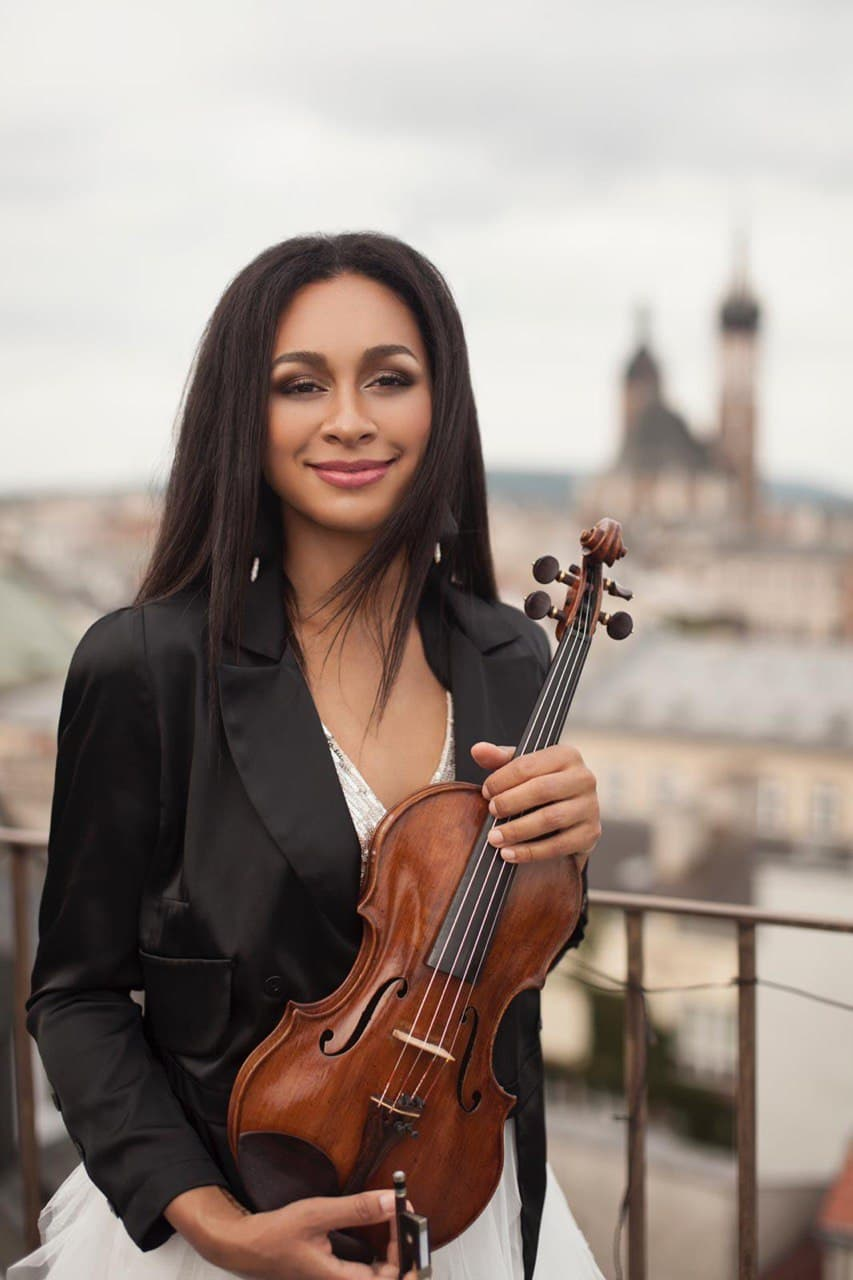
- Maimuna in 2019

Background information
- Born: Maimuna Amadu Diko; 28 May 1980 (age 46); Leningrad, Russian SFSR, USSR (now St Petersburg, Russia)
- Origin: Mogilev, Belarus
- Genres: Classical crossover
- Occupation: Violinist
- Instruments: Violin; piano
- Years active: 1990–present

Maimuna Amadu Murashko (née Diko; Belarusian: Маймуна Амаду Мурашка (Дзіка); Russian: Маймуна Амаду Мурашко (Дико); born 28 May 1980), known professionally as simply Maimuna, is a Belarusian violinist who represented Belarus in the Eurovision Song Contest 2015 along with Uzari with the song "Time".

== Early life ==
Maimuna was born in Saint Petersburg, Russia to a Belarusian mother and a Malian father. When she was young, her family moved to Mali, but being unable to adapt to the hot climate, Maimuna moved in with her grandmother in Mogilev, Belarus, where she was raised.

== Career ==
=== 1990–2013: early career ===
Maimuna has participated in several international competitions throughout her career such including the 1990 Young Virtuoso competition in Kiev and the 1996 Music of Hope competition.

=== 2014–present: Eurovision Song Contest 2015 ===
On 5 December 2014, Maimuna was announced as one of the competitions in Eurofest 2015 along with Uzari performing the song "Time". Uzari and Maimuna won the competition with 76 points, placing third in the televote and first in three of the five jurors' scores. They represented Belarus at the Eurovision Song Contest 2015. Uzari and Maimuna failed to pass semi final 1 in the contest. They finished 12th in semi-final 1.

== See also ==
- Belarus in the Eurovision Song Contest 2015

Awards and achievements
| Preceded by Teo with "Cheesecake" | Belarus in the Eurovision Song Contest; 2015 (with Uzari) | Succeeded by Ivan with "Help You Fly" |
