= Cheev =

Belarusian and Ukrainian singer

- Born: Uladzislau Chyzhykau (Уладзіслаў Чыжыкаў); 31 December 1993 (age 32); Babruysk, Mogilev Region, Belarus
- Occupation: Singer
- Years active: 2018–present
- Musical career
- Instrument: Vocals

Uladzislau Chyzhykau (Note: BGN/PCGN romanization of Belarusian) (Belarusian: Уладзіслаў Чыжыкаў; Ukrainian: Владислав Чижиков, romanized: Vladyslav Chyzykov; born 31 December 1993), known professionally by his stage name as Cheev (stylised in all caps), is a Belarusian and Ukrainian singer, author and performer of his own songs. Winner of the National Music Award "Lira" in the nomination "Discovery of the Year" (2017, Belarus).

Finalist of the Belarusian national selection for the Eurovision Song Contest (2016, 2018). Winner of the Belarusian music project "Talent Academy 2" by the National Television, participant of the Ukrainian projects "X-Factor" (2016) and "Holos Krainy" (2019).

== Biography ==
He worked as a Bulgarian language teacher in Minsk.

Cheev was a member of the band Radiokhvylia, which reached the final of the Belarusian national selection for the Eurovision Song Contest 2018, which was won by Alekseev.

== Career ==
He has recorded covers of songs by various artists, including Ukrainian ones.

Since 2019, he has been writing songs in Ukrainian. In the same year, Ukrainian singer Anna Trincher presented the song "Oshybky", written by Vladyslav.

In the program "Belsat Music Live" he sang a duet with Julia Sanina the song "Stones".

In 2022, the video for the song "Harno tak" gathered more than 8 million views and hit YouTube trends and was on the first line of the Apple Music Ukraine top 100 chart.

== Discography ==
=== Studio albums ===
- Drama (2021)
- Noir (2023)
- Romcom (2025)

=== Singles ===
List of singles as lead artist, showing year released, chart positions and album name
Title	Year	Peak chart positions		Album or EP
Title	Year	UKR Air.	CIS Air.	Album or EP
"Oberihaty"	2019	—	—	Drama
"Shcho tse v nas"	2020	—	—	Drama
"Kym zavhodno"	2020	—	—	Drama
"Vodar"	2021	—	—	Drama
"Iminimi"	2021	—	—	Drama
"Loto"	2021	—	—	Drama
"Harno tak"	2021	1	124	Drama
"Mriyeshsya"	2022	59	—	Noir
"Pechal'"	2023	72	—	Noir
"Pazl"	2023	22	—	Noir
"Pazl" (Remix) (with Kolaba)	2023	76	—	Non-album single
"De moya lyubov zhyve"	2023	201	—	Noir
"De moya lyubov zhyve" (Remix) (with Kolaba)	2023	—	—	Non-album singles
"Taro"	2024	116	—	Non-album singles
"Rana"	2024	3	172	Romcom
"Mamo" (with Naviband)	2024	—	—	Non-album singles
"Ne znayu" (with Anna Trincher)	2024	98	—	Non-album singles
"Tykhyy doshch"	2024	52	—	Romcom
"Den' u den'"	2025	46	—	Romcom
"Yak mayaky"	2025	127	—	Romcom
"Raz v zhytti"	2025	3	147	Romcom
"Obiymy-obiymy" (with Zlata Ognevich)	2025	11	—	Non-album singles
"Mistsya"	2026	—	—	Non-album singles
"Ne many"	2026	85	—	Non-album singles
"—" denotes items which were not released in that country or failed to chart.

=== Promotional singles ===
List of promotional singles as lead artist, showing year released, chart positions and album name
Title	Year	Peak chart positions	Album or EP
Title	Year	UKR Air.	Album or EP
"Pershyy den'"	2023	57	Non-album single

=== Other charted songs ===
List of other charted songs as lead artist, showing year released, chart positions and album name
Title	Year	Peak chart positions	Album or EP
Title	Year	UKR Air.	Album or EP
"Bil'sh nemaye kryl"	2023	122	Noir
"Tviy aromat"	2025	61	Romcom

=== Videoclips ===
- "Oberihaty" / «Оберігати» (2020)
- "Harno tak" / «Гарно так» (2021)
- "Mriieshsia" / «Мрієшся» (2022)
- "Pechal" / «Печаль» (2023)
- "Pazl" / «Пазл» (2023)
