= Uzari =

Uzari Юзары
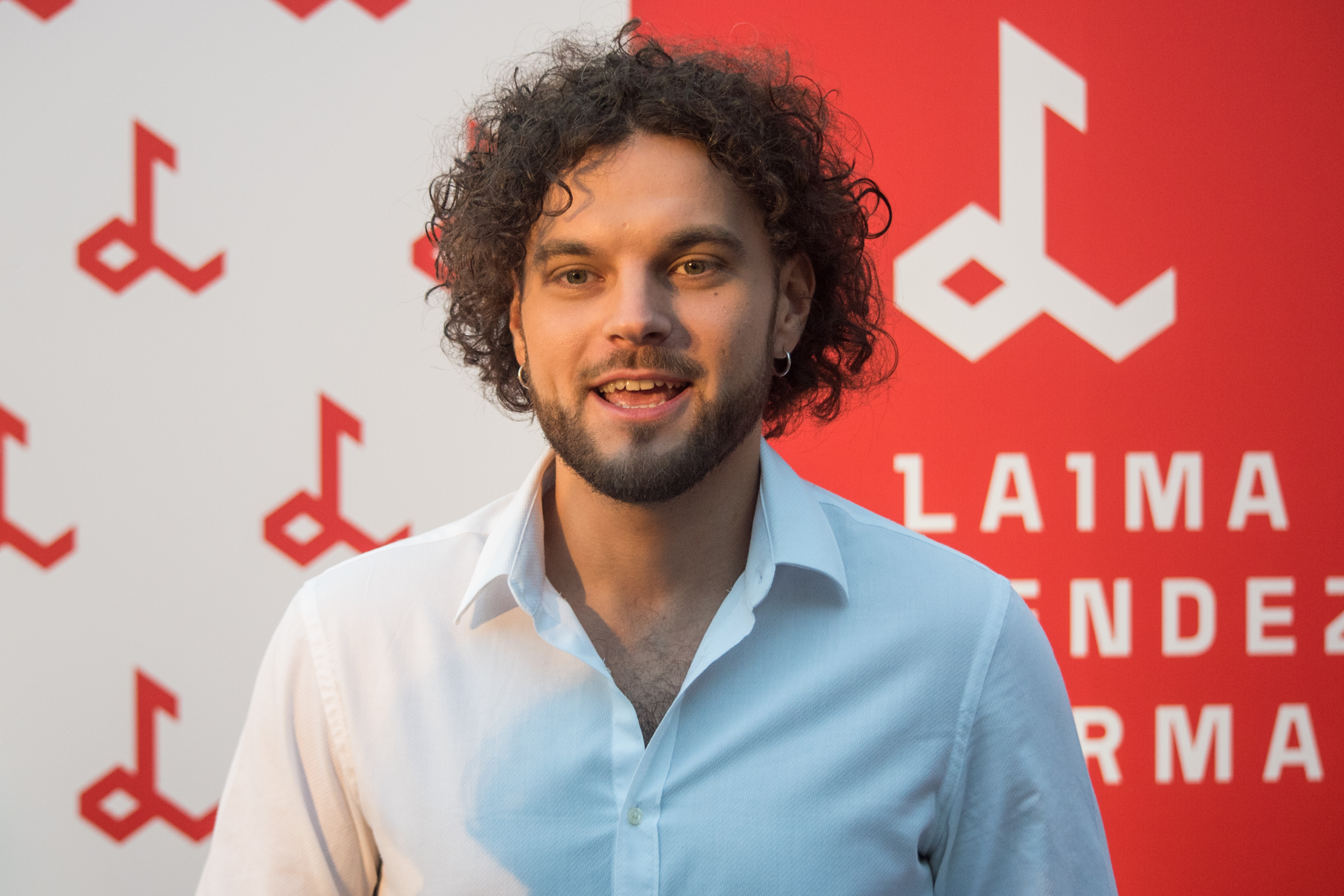
- Uzari in 2017

Background information
- Born: Yuri Naurotski; 11 May 1991 (age 35); Minsk, Byelorussian SSR, Soviet Union
- Genres: Pop
- Occupations: Singer, songwriter
- Instrument: Vocals

Yuri Naurotski (Russian: Юрий Навроцкий; Belarusian: Юрый Наўроцкі; born 11 May 1991 in Minsk), better known by his stage name Uzari (Russian: Юзари, Belarusian: Юзары), is a Belarusian singer and songwriter. He represented Belarus at the Eurovision Song Contest 2015 with Maimuna with the song "Time".

Previously, he competed in the Belarusian national final in 2012 with the song "The Winner", coming in 5th place, and in 2013 with the song "Secret", coming in 8th place. He was also one of Anastasia Vinnikova's backing singers at Eurovision Song Contest 2011.

He co-composed Belarus's entry into the Junior Eurovision Song Contest 2014, "Sokal" by Nadezhda Misyakova which came in 7th place out of 16th with 71 points

Uzari and Maimuna represented Belarus at the Eurovision Song Contest 2015, but failed to qualify for the final. They finished 12th in semi-final 1 (13th Televote/ 8th Jury).

== Biography ==
Uzari was born in a family of musicians in the third generation. His mother is a singer, a soloist of the National academic concert orchestra, and his father is a holder of higher musical education in the trumpet class. Uzari studied in several schools: General education, theater and music. In 2008 he entered the St. Petersburg University of culture and arts at the jazz department and graduated in 2013

In 2008, Uzari started working in the theater "Music Hall" and was seen by the Directors: he played the role of Kai and Raven in the musical "Snow Queen". The first public composition of Yuri was "What is between us", which in 2011 was awarded the "Song of the year of Belarus". In the same year in the summer Uzari became the representative of Belarus at the International competition of young performers of popular music "New wave".

In 2012 and 2013 Uzari participated in the selection for Eurovision and reached the finals with the songs "The Winner" and "Secret". In 2014, he became a producer, composer and arranger of the song "Sokal", which Nadezhda Misyakova performed at the Junior Eurovision song contest. Finally, in 2015 Uzari together with Belarusian violinist Maimuna presented Belarus at Eurovision 2015 with the song "Time".

Uzari is the winner of the award of ONT channel "Song of the year of Belarus" (2011–2016). In 2016, he founded his production company "Art Platform". In the same year, Yuri took part in the Ukrainian TV show "Voice of the country" (Ukrainian version of the show The Voice), hitting the team of Tina Karol.

== UZARI ==
UZARI is a musical project of the Belarusian artist and composer Uzari Navrotsky. In 2013 he released the song "Secret", with which he participated in the Belarusian National qualifying round for the Eurovision song contest.

In 2016, the first single in Belarusian "Mora" (The Sea) was released, which received the award "Song of the year of Belarus".

In 2017 came out the following Belarusian singles "The Opposite" and "I imagine".

In February 2019 the single "Padziaka serca" has been released.

On April 10, 2019, the album "Padziaka serca" has been released.

== Music ==
=== As a singer ===
- 2012: The Winner
- 2013: Secret
- 2013: Купалінка (Kupalinka)
- 2013: Tishina (Silence)
- 2014/15: Time (with Maimuna)
- 2016: Mora (The Sea)
- 2017 - Супрацьлеглыя (The opposite)
- 2017 - Я Выдумляю (I Imagine)
- 2018 - Be Open
- 2018 - This Land
- 2019 - Падзяка Сэрца (The Grateful Heart)
- 2019 - The Winner (feat. Toure Masters)
- 2019 - Sunlight

=== As а composer ===
- 2014: Sokal (Falcon) for Nadezhda Misyakova
- 2015: Shag za Shagom (Step by Step) for Masha Novik
- 2018: Made of Steel for Vanya Zdonyuk, Blazing for Viola, Мотылек (Butterfly) for Nastya Glamm, They Know for Angelina Pipper, На стиле (On style) for Monkey Tops
- 2019: Посмотри на нас (Look at us) for Monkey Tops

== Music videos ==
- Tell Me (2012; dir. Alexander Potapov)
- Time (2015; dir. Dmitry Semenov)
- Padziaka Serca (2019; dir. Anna Gert)

== See also ==
- Belarus in the Eurovision Song Contest 2015

Awards and achievements
Preceded by Teo with "Cheesecake"	Belarus in the Eurovision Song Contest; 2015 (with Maimuna)	Succeeded by Ivan with "Help You Fly"
