= ROSTANY =

Belarusian musical group

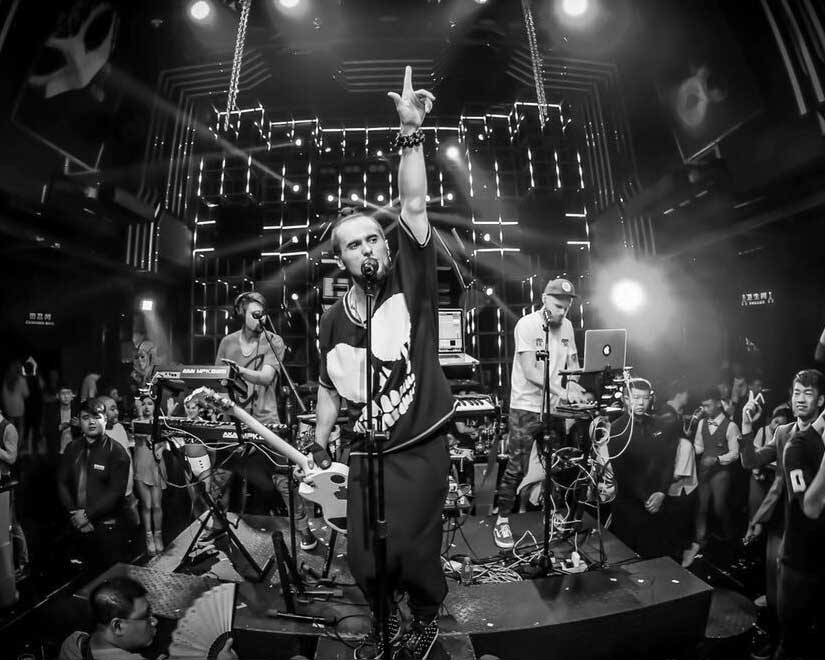
- ROSTANY Electric Toys Show tour (China, 2017)

Background information
- Genres: Alternative Dance Music, EDM, House, Complextro, Big Beat, Brostep, Hybrid Trap
- Years active: 2012–present
- Labels: VG (Chicago, US)
- Members: Viktar Rudenka, Sergei Kuchynski, Albert Krasnov
- Website: www.rostany.com

ROSTANY (also stylised ROS†ANY) is a Belarusian 3-piece EDM band who, due to their peculiar stage performance style, can also be characterised as alternative dance music. The trio was formed in 2012 and claimed to be, unlike most representatives of the genre, the first live-only Electro House band playing DJ-style music by manually performing parts note by note, as in traditional music, or triggering sound effect clips, avoiding pre-made solid backing tracks or DJ playback. Since its creation the band has been a radio and TV success in Belarus, winning the Reload of the Year nomination at the Belarusian Song of the Year Awards 2013 on ONT National Channel and later nominated for National Awards 2014. In 2015 the ROSTANY were invited to compose and produce a soundtrack for Belarusian National Television Awards Televershina and perform live during the nomination.

ROSTANY advocate the idea of bringing the human element back to the modern "digital" EDM stage performance and fight against finger syncing, emphasising that playing back a studio recording to the public can not be referred to as "live performance". ROSTANY insist that "the audience of a live show deserve more than a play button pressed". Their motto being "We don't fake it - we play it", the band received certain attention on China's club scene and was invited for the first tour around China in 2015, which was followed by 2017 tour when Rostany played their Electric Toys Show in more than 40 big cities around China.

== Formation and style ==
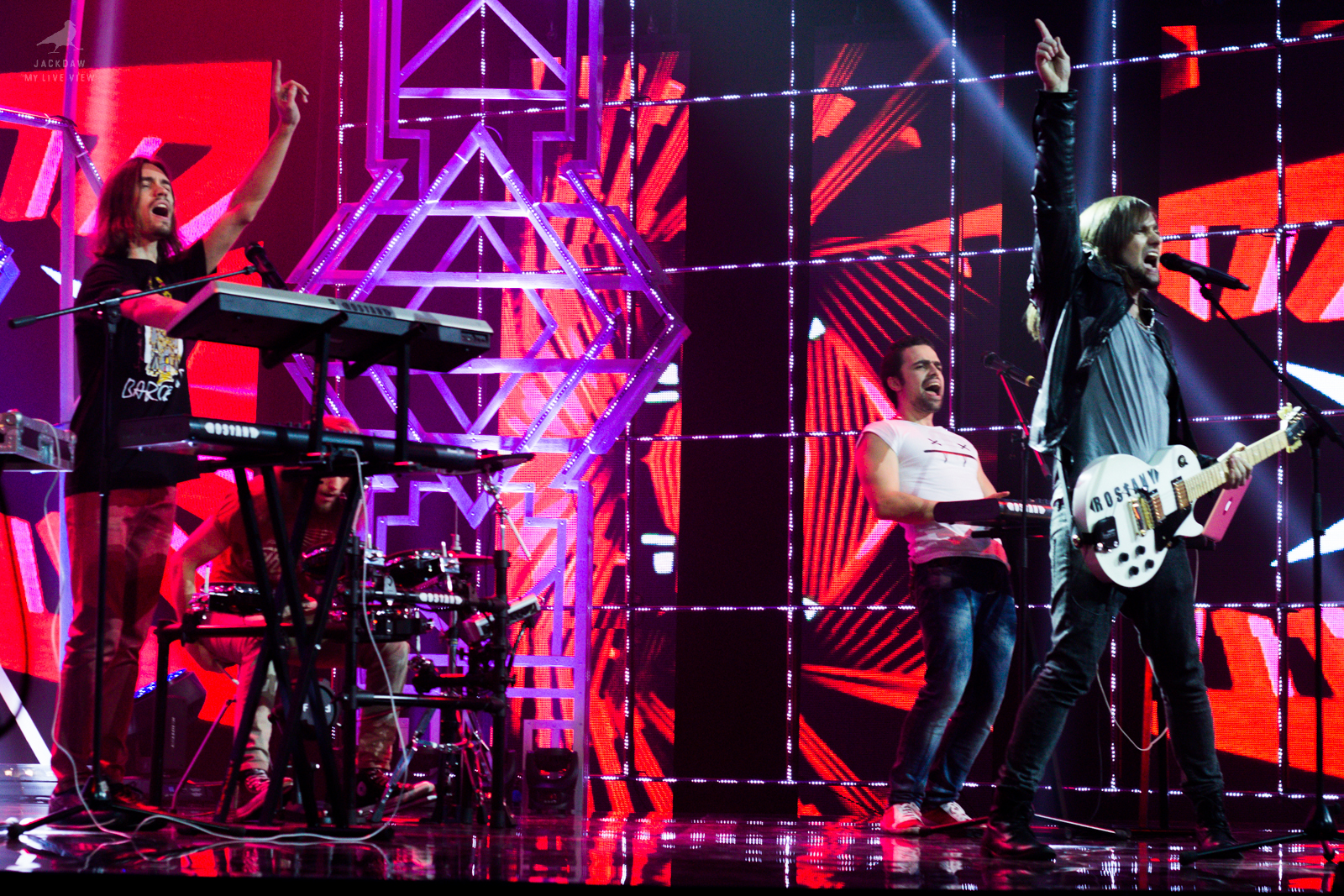
ROSTANY at National Music Awards 2014 on ONT National Television

The band was formed by ex-leader of electronic rock band DALI Vic Torr (real name: Viktar Rudenka) performing vocals and guitar, and his bandmate Anton Rubacky (bass, synths). In 2011 Rudenka invited Rubacky to DALI to continue experimenting with digital synthesizers using them together with traditional electric instruments, later deciding to further change acoustic drums to an electronic drum set, incorporate guitar synth and experiment with realtime sidechaining. This driving DALI music too far from electronic rock, the band came up with a concept of creating modern EDM with the maximum of live human involvement, contrary to conventional EDM shows where DJs play back previously recorded audio material or groups play live against a solid playback record. In year 2012 Rudenka disbanded DALI and named the new band "ROSTANY" which means "crossroads" or "change" in Belarusian. After the first ROSTANY tour around China in 2015 Vladimir Ivanov leaves the band and Anton Rubacky is replaced by classical pianist Albert Krasnov.

== Radio, TV, live performances and debut LP ==
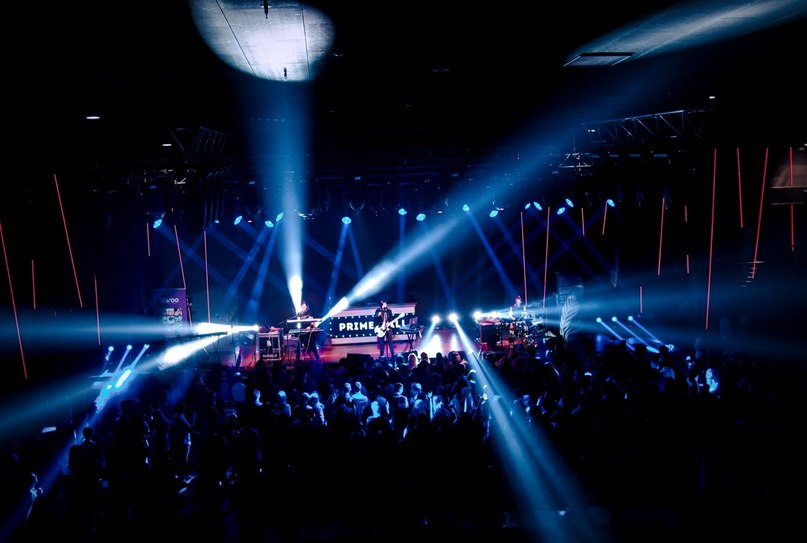
ROSTANY Live Show on Belarusian State University 93 Anniversary

Alright was the debut song by ROSTANY and immediately became popular on Belarusian radio stations. This was followed by Friday 13 whose radio success led to it being nominated Song of the Year 2013 in Belarus. Later on the band was invited by the Belarus First National Channel to contribute to a cultural TV project Forth to the Past aiming to popularize authentic ethnic Belarusian songs by creating contemporary music style remakes. The ROSTANY covered ethnic Belarusian song "Камарыкi" creating their dubstep hip-hop version titled Daisy Chain, which was later used by First National Channel as the soundtrack for Junior Eurovision Song Contest nominations.

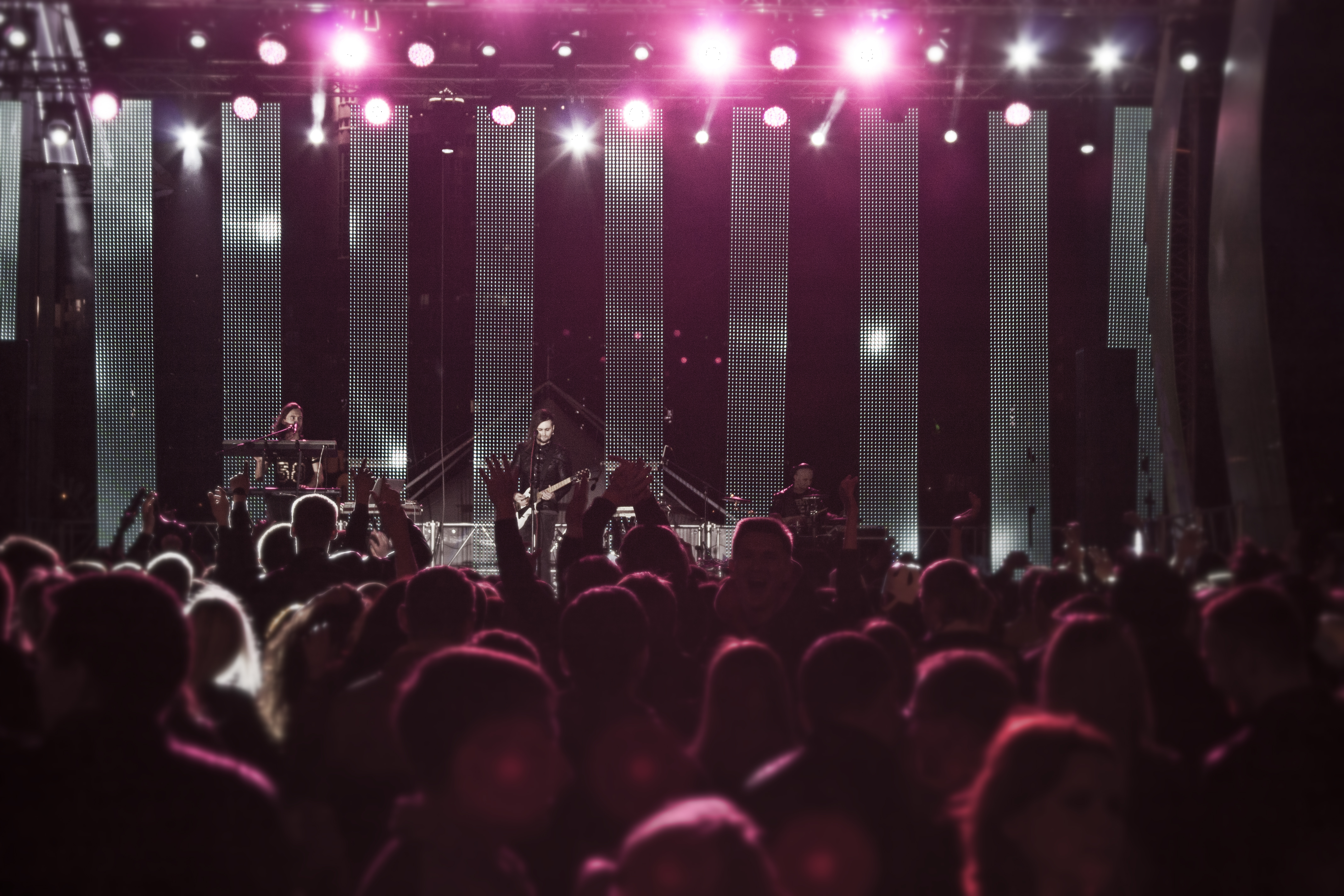
ROSTANY at Hockey World Championship 2014 show, Minsk, Belarus

Apart from this TV collaboration, the ROSTANY were invited to produce a soundtrack for the sports TV show Force Factor ("Фактор силы") on Belarus-5 TV channel. For this project the band wrote their Electro House symphony Pain that was a radio success listing ROSTANY on Top 50 chart of ONT National Television at the end of 2014.

ROSTANY, being a Belarusian breakthrough act, were also invited to perform 9 live shows for international hockey fans during the Ice Hockey World Championship 2014 held in Minsk, Belarus. In 2016 the band was signed by Chicago-based VG label releasing ROSTANY debut LP titled Copy-Paste Me.

== Activism and side projects ==
The leader of ROSTANY Viktar Rudenka has individually supported various social movements including the European Youth Parliament and Amnesty International. In 2013 together with Lavon Volski, Alaksandr Pamidorau, Nasta Shpakouskaya and other outstanding Belarusian artists Viktar Rudenka took part in The Last Dawn project (Апошнi золак) — a musical show which publicised the problem of the death penalty in Belarus. Viktar Rudenka contributed to the show both as a songwriter and as a performing artist. The musical was filmed and released on CD and DVD.

== Discography ==
=== Studio albums ===
- Copy-Paste Me (2016)
