= Belarus in the Eurovision Song Contest 2015 =

- Eurovision Song Contest 2015
- Participating broadcaster: Belarusian Television and Radio Company (BTRC)
- Country: Belarus
- Selection process: National final
- Selection date: 26 December 2014

Competing entry
- Song: "Time"
- Artist: Uzari and Maimuna
- Songwriters: Uzari; Gerylana; Maimuna

Placement
- Semi-final result: Failed to qualify (12th)

Participation chronology

Belarus was represented at the Eurovision Song Contest 2015 with the song "Time", written by Uzari, Gerylana, and Maimuna, and performed by Uzari and Maimuna. The Belarusian participating broadcaster, Belarusian Television and Radio Company (BTRC), selected its entry for the contest through a national final. The national final consisted of fifteen competing acts participating in a televised production where "Time" performed by Uzari and Maimuna was selected as the winner following the combination of votes from a jury panel and public televoting.

Belarus was drawn to compete in the first semi-final of the Eurovision Song Contest which took place on 19 May 2015. Performing during the show in position 11, "Time" was not announced among the top 10 entries of the first semi-final and therefore did not qualify to compete in the final. It was later revealed that Belarus placed twelfth out of the 16 participating countries in the semi-final with 39 points.

== Background ==
Prior to the 2015 contest, Belarusian Television and Radio Company (BTRC) had participated in the Eurovision Song Contest representing Belarus eleven times since its first entry in 2004. Its best placing in the contest was sixth, achieved in 2007 with the song "Work Your Magic" performed by Dmitry Koldun. Following the introduction of semi-finals for the 2004 contest, Belarus had managed to qualify to the final four times. In 2014, "Cheesecake" performed by Teo qualified to the final and placed sixteenth.

As part of its duties as participating broadcaster, BTRC organises the selection of its entry in the Eurovision Song Contest and broadcasts the event in the country. The broadcaster has used both internal selections and national finals to select its entry for Eurovision in the past. Since 2012, BTRC has organised a national final in order to choose its entry, a selection procedure that continued for 2015.

== Before Eurovision ==
=== National final ===
The Belarusian national final took place on 26 December 2014. Fifteen songs participated in the competition and the winner was selected through a jury and a public televote. The show was broadcast on Belarus 1 and Belarus 24 as well as online via the broadcaster's official website tvr.by and the Eurovision Song Contest's official website eurovision.tv.

==== Competing entries ====
Artists and composers were able to submit their applications and entries to the broadcaster between 21 October 2014 and 21 November 2014. At the closing of the deadline, over 110 entries were received by the broadcaster. Auditions were held on 4 and 5 December 2014 at the BTRC "600 Metrov" studio where a jury panel was tasked with selecting up to fifteen entries from the 89 attendees to proceed to the televised national final. The auditions were webcast online at the official BTRC website. The jury consisted of Vasily Rainchik (musician/composer), Alexander Tikhanovich (singer), Elena Treshchinskaya (head of the radio station "Radius FM"), Olga Ryzhikova (television host), Evgeniy Papkovich (executive producer of the BTRC channel Belarus 1), Andrey Kholodinskiy (music editor at the radio station "Radio-Roks") and Marianna Drabovich (head of the Department of Arts, Ministry of Culture of the Republic of Belarus). Fifteen finalists were selected and announced on 5 December 2014 during BTRC's programme Panorama.

Artist	Song	Songwriter(s)
Alexey Gross	"Stand As One"	Leonid Shirin, Alexei Shirin, Yuri Vashchuk
Anastasia Malashkevich	"Don't Save My Name"	Pavel Klyshevsky, Anastasia Vahomchik
Beatrees	"Fighter"	Jamie Sellers
Daria	"Love Is My Colour"	Daria, Pavel Baranovsky
Gunesh	"I Believe in a Miracle"	Gunesh Abasova, Svetlana Geraskova
Janet	"Supernova"	Ylva Persson, Linda Persson, Will Taylor
Lis	"Angel"	Denis Lis, Dmitriy Minin
Milki	"Accent"	Alexander Rybak, Yaroslav Rakitin
Muzzart	"Only Dance"	Vladimir Krutikov, Yana Butskevich
Napoli	"My Dreams"	Olga Shimanskaya, Aleksey Zubarevich
Rostany	"Electric Toys"	Viktor Rudenko
Tasha Odi	"Giving Up Your Love"	Ylva Persson, Linda Persson, Peter Hägerås, Niclas Haglund
Uzari and Maimuna	"Time"	Uzari, Svetlana Geraskova, Maimuna
Valeria Sadovskaya	"Summer Love"	Leonid Shirin, Alexei Shirin
Vitaly Voronko	"Drajv" (Драйв)	Vitaly Voronko, Vladimir Kubyshkin

==== Final ====
The televised final took place on 26 December 2014 at the "600 Metrov" studio in Minsk, hosted by Olga Ryzhikova and Denis Dudinskiy. Prior to the competition, a draw for the running order took place on 7 December 2014. A combination of votes from seven jury members made up of music professionals (7/8) and public televoting (1/8) selected the song "Time" performed by Uzari and Maimuna as the winner. The jury consisted of Gennady Davydko (BTRC Chairman), Eduard Zaritskiy (People's Artist of Belarus/composer), Marianna Drabovich (head of the Department of Arts, Ministry of Culture of the Republic of Belarus), Andrei Mikheev (music critic and Eurovision expert), Sergei Andrianov (journalist), Elena Treshchinskaya (head of the radio station "Radius FM") and Dmitry Novik (television presenter).

In addition to the performances from the competitors, the show featured guest performances by 2014 Belarusian Eurovision contestant Teo, 2013 Belarusian Eurovision contestant Alyona Lanskaya, Drozdy, Victoria Aleshko, Misters, Eliz, Dubravin and Krasovskiy, Aura, 4L and Olga Gornichar.

Final – 26 December 2014
R/O	Artist	Song	Jury	Televote		Total	Place
R/O	Artist	Song	Jury	Votes	Points	Total	Place
1	Napoli	"My Dreams"	29	1,159	7	36	6
2	Lis	"Angel"	17	424	2	19	9
3	Daria	"Love Is My Colour"	14	193	0	14	11
4	Gunesh	"I Believe in a Miracle"	59	531	3	62	3
5	Muzzart	"Only Dance"	18	2,862	12	30	7
6	Valeria Sadovskaya	"Summer Love"	28	403	0	28	8
7	Rostany	"Electric Toys"	9	373	0	9	13
8	Janet	"Supernova"	5	200	0	5	14
9	Alexey Gross	"Stand As One"	40	917	5	45	5
10	Milki	"Accent"	37	2,226	10	47	4
11	Uzari and Maimuna	"Time"	68	1,188	8	76	1
12	Beatrees	"Fighter"	10	939	6	16	10
13	Vitaly Voronko	"Drajv"	1	268	0	1	15
14	Anastasia Malashkevich	"Don't Save My Name"	62	710	4	66	2
15	Tasha Odi	"Giving Up Your Love"	9	408	1	10	12

Detailed Jury Votes
R/O	Song	G. Davidko	E. Zaritskiy	M. Drabovich	A. Mikheev	S. Andrianov	E. Treshchinskaya	D. Novik	Total
1	"My Dreams"	4	6	2	4	3	6	4	29
2	"Angel"	5	2		6	2		2	17
3	"Love Is My Colour"		4	6		1	2	1	14
4	"I Believe in a Miracle"	3	12	8	7	12	12	5	59
5	"Only Dance"				1	7		10	18
6	"Summer Love"		5	4		4	7	8	28
7	"Electric Toys"			3	3		3		9
8	"Supernova"	2	1		2				5
9	"Stand As One"	8		7	10	8	4	3	40
10	"Accent"	6	7	1	5	6	5	7	37
11	"Time"	12	8	12	12	10	8	6	68
12	"Fighter"	10							10
13	"Drajv"	1							1
14	"Don't Save My Name"	7	10	10	8	5	10	12	62
15	"Giving Up Your Love"		3	5			1		9

=== Promotion ===
Uzari and Maimuna made several appearances across Europe to specifically promote "Time" as the Belarusian Eurovision entry. On 18 April, Uzari and Maimuna performed during the Eurovision in Concert event which was held at the Melkweg venue in Amsterdam, Netherlands and hosted by Cornald Maas and Edsilia Rombley. On 24 April, Uzari and Maimuna performed during the Eurovision Pre-Party, which was held at the Place de Paris Korston Concert Hall in Moscow, Russia.

== At Eurovision ==
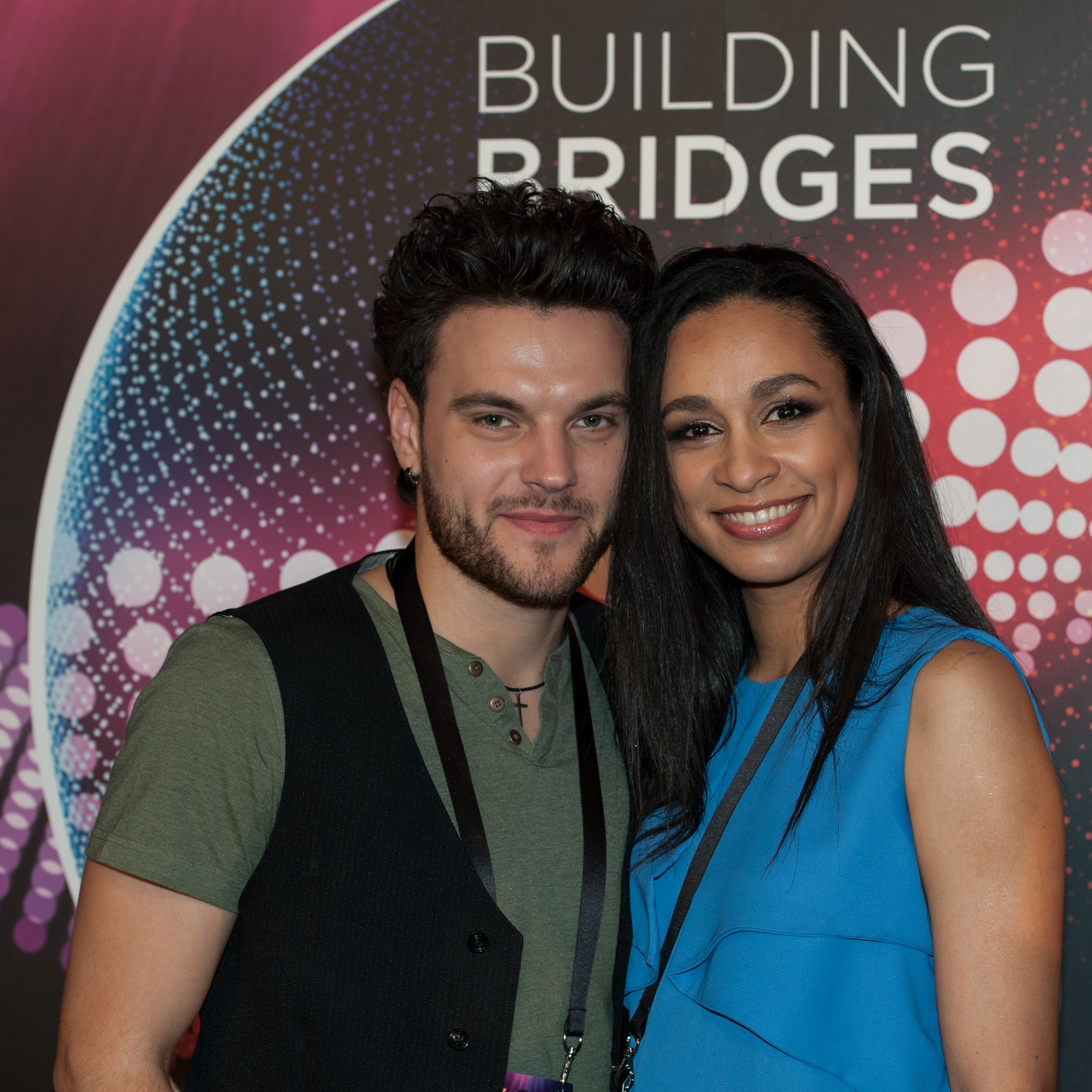
Uzari and Maimuna during a press meet and greet

According to Eurovision rules, all nations with the exceptions of the host country and the "Big Five" (France, Germany, Italy, Spain and the United Kingdom) are required to qualify from one of two semi-finals in order to compete for the final; the top ten countries from each semi-final progress to the final. In the 2015 contest, Australia also competed directly in the final as an invited guest nation. The European Broadcasting Union (EBU) split up the competing countries into five different pots based on voting patterns from previous contests, with countries with favourable voting histories put into the same pot. On 26 January 2015, a special allocation draw was held which placed each country into one of the two semi-finals, as well as which half of the show they would perform in. Belarus was placed into the first semi-final, to be held on 19 May 2015, and was scheduled to perform in the second half of the show.

Once all the competing songs for the 2015 contest had been released, the running order for the semi-finals was decided by the shows' producers rather than through another draw, so that similar songs were not placed next to each other. Belarus was set to perform in position 11, following the entry from Serbia and before the entry from Russia.

The two semi-finals and the final were broadcast in Belarus on Belarus 1 and Belarus 24 with commentary by Evgeny Perlin. The Belarusian spokesperson, who announced the Belarusian votes during the final, was 2014 Eurovision entrant Teo.

=== Semi-final ===
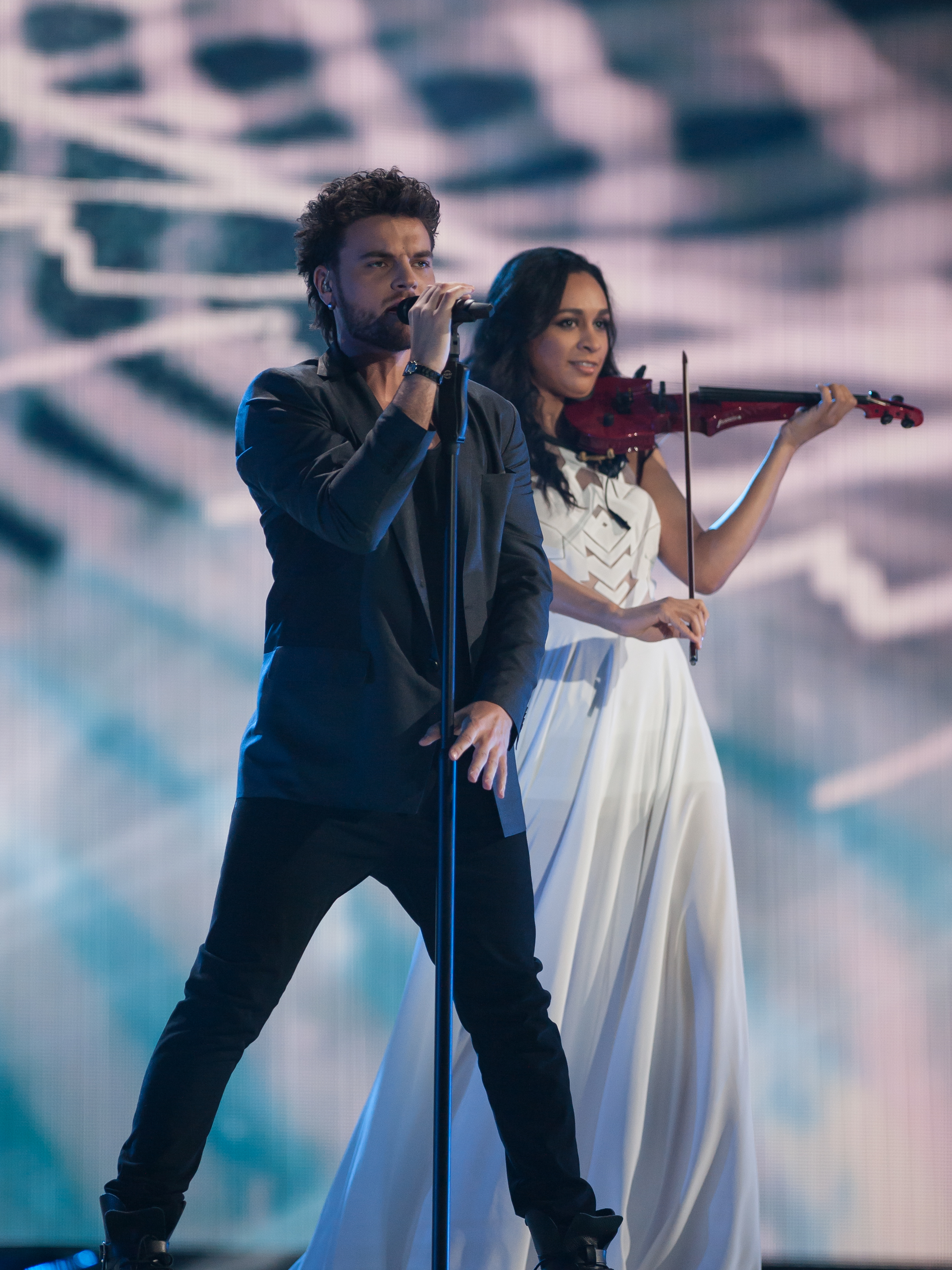
Uzari and Maimuna during a rehearsal before the first semi-final

Uzari and Maimuna took part in technical rehearsals on 12 and 15 May, followed by dress rehearsals on 18 and 19 May. This included the jury show on 18 May where the professional juries of each country watched and voted on the competing entries.

The Belarusian performance featured Uzari dressed in black and performing on stage with violinist Maimuna who was dressed in white. The stage colours transitioned from red to blue as the performance progressed with the LED screens displaying an electrocardiogram as well as vibrating strings and strikes of lightning. Uzari and Maimuna was joined by three off-stage backing vocalists: Yury Seleznyov, Artyom Akhmash and Denis Lis.

At the end of the show, Belarus was not announced among the top 10 entries in the first semi-final and therefore failed to qualify to compete in the final. It was later revealed that Belarus placed twelfth in the semi-final, receiving a total of 39 points.

=== Voting ===
Voting during the three shows consisted of 50 percent public televoting and 50 percent from a jury deliberation. The jury consisted of five music industry professionals who were citizens of the country they represent, with their names published before the contest to ensure transparency. This jury was asked to judge each contestant based on: vocal capacity; the stage performance; the song's composition and originality; and the overall impression by the act. In addition, no member of a national jury could be related in any way to any of the competing acts in such a way that they cannot vote impartially and independently. The individual rankings of each jury member were released shortly after the grand final.

Following the release of the full split voting by the EBU after the conclusion of the competition, it was revealed that Belarus had placed thirteenth with the public televote and seventh with the jury vote in the first semi-final. In the public vote, Belarus scored 32 points, while in the jury vote, Belarus scored 65 points.

Below is a breakdown of points awarded to Belarus and awarded by Belarus in the first semi-final and grand final of the contest, and the breakdown of the jury voting and televoting conducted during the two shows:

==== Points awarded to Belarus ====
Points awarded to Belarus (Semi-final 1)
Score	Country
12 points	Georgia
10 points	
8 points	Moldova
7 points	Armenia
6 points	Russia
5 points	
4 points	
3 points	Denmark; Greece
2 points	
1 point	

==== Points awarded by Belarus ====
Points awarded by Belarus (Semi-final 1)
Score	Country
12 points	Russia
10 points	Georgia
8 points	Estonia
7 points	Armenia
6 points	Belgium
5 points	Moldova
4 points	Serbia
3 points	Greece
2 points	Romania
1 point	Finland

Points awarded by Belarus (Final)
Score	Country
12 points	Russia
10 points	Sweden
8 points	Belgium
7 points	Estonia
6 points	Australia
5 points	Latvia
4 points	Armenia
3 points	Georgia
2 points	Israel
1 point	Italy

==== Detailed voting results ====
The following members comprised the Belarusian jury:

- Nataliya Marinova (jury chairperson) – director of TV channel "Belarus 2"
- Vitaly Karpanov – singer, composer, showman
- Oksana Artushevskaya – expert in the field of culture and art
- Alexey Gross – singer, vocal coach
- Iskui Abalyan – singer, composer

Detailed voting results from Belarus (Semi-final 1)
R/O	Country	N. Marinova	V. Karpanov	O. Artushevskaya	A. Gross	I. Abalyan	Jury Rank	Televote Rank	Combined Rank	Points
01	Moldova	5	1	3	5	4	4	5	6	5
02	Armenia	2	5	2	4	1	2	6	4	7
03	Belgium	4	3	8	6	5	5	4	5	6
04	Netherlands	14	7	10	7	15	10	13	14	
05	Finland	11	13	15	14	13	14	7	10	1
06	Greece	8	9	4	8	8	7	12	8	3
07	Estonia	10	8	5	3	7	6	2	3	8
08	Macedonia	15	15	14	11	14	15	15	15	
09	Serbia	7	10	9	13	10	9	10	7	4
10	Hungary	9	12	12	15	6	11	11	12	
11	Belarus									
12	Russia	3	2	6	2	3	3	1	1	12
13	Denmark	13	11	13	12	11	13	9	11	
14	Albania	6	6	7	9	9	8	14	13	
15	Romania	12	14	11	10	12	12	8	9	2
16	Georgia	1	4	1	1	2	1	3	2	10

Detailed voting results from Belarus (Final)
R/O	Country	N. Marinova	V. Karpanov	O. Artushevskaya	A. Gross	I. Abalyan	Jury Rank	Televote Rank	Combined Rank	Points
01	Slovenia	26	7	26	25	26	24	12	19	
02	France	16	24	23	5	12	16	27	23	
03	Israel	13	8	12	6	11	7	11	9	2
04	Estonia	9	3	14	12	19	9	2	4	7
05	United Kingdom	10	18	7	17	7	10	25	18	
06	Armenia	4	9	8	7	6	5	9	7	4
07	Lithuania	20	10	9	16	8	12	20	14	
08	Serbia	17	11	24	19	22	20	15	16	
09	Norway	12	23	11	20	10	14	14	11	
10	Sweden	3	1	1	2	2	1	5	2	10
11	Cyprus	7	17	4	15	9	8	24	15	
12	Australia	2	5	3	1	3	3	8	5	6
13	Belgium	5	2	5	4	4	4	3	3	8
14	Austria	21	16	22	23	18	23	26	26	
15	Greece	14	13	15	10	15	13	22	17	
16	Montenegro	25	27	21	26	17	26	18	24	
17	Germany	19	14	17	18	16	17	19	21	
18	Poland	18	12	20	22	21	19	17	20	
19	Latvia	11	6	6	11	5	6	6	6	5
20	Romania	24	15	16	21	20	21	16	22	
21	Spain	15	19	18	13	25	18	13	12	
22	Hungary	23	20	19	27	27	25	21	25	
23	Georgia	6	22	10	9	14	11	7	8	3
24	Azerbaijan	22	25	25	14	13	22	10	13	
25	Russia	1	4	2	3	1	2	1	1	12
26	Albania	27	21	27	24	24	27	23	27	
27	Italy	8	26	13	8	23	15	4	10	1
