= Teo (Belarusian singer) =

Belarusian singer

Teo Юрий Алексеевич Ващук
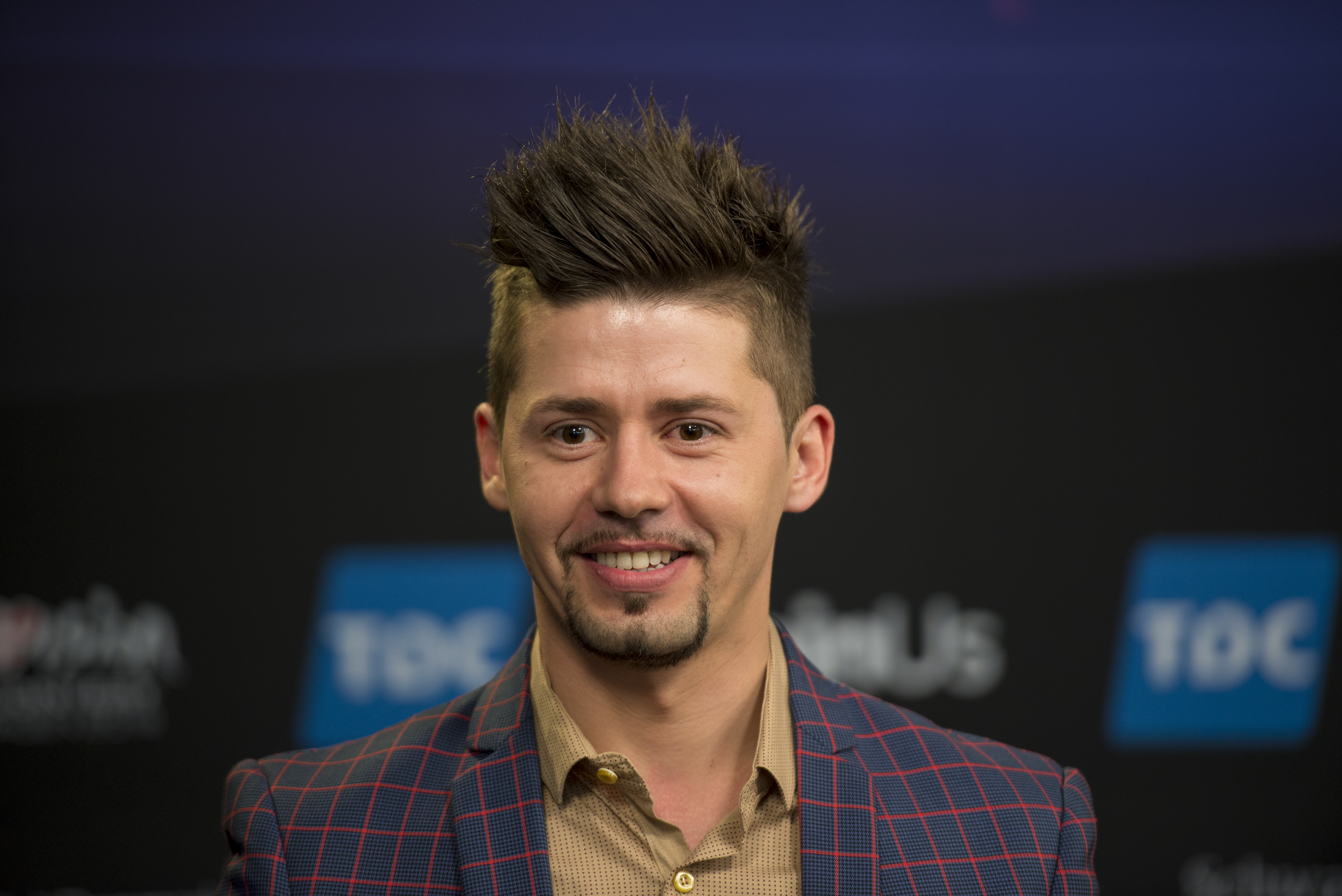
- Teo at the Eurovision Song Contest, 2014

Background information
- Born: Yuriy Alexeyevich Vashchuk; 24 January 1983 (age 43); Khidry, Byelorussian SSR, USSR
- Genre: Pop
- Occupations: Singer; songwriter; television presenter
- Years active: 2000–present

Yuriy Alexeyevich Vashchuk (Russian: Юрий Алексеевич Ващук, Yuriy Alekseyevich Vashchuk, Belarusian: Юрый Аляксеевіч Вашчук, Juryj Aliaksiejevič Vaščuk; born 24 January 1983), better known by his stage name Teo, is a Belarusian singer, songwriter, and television presenter.

Teo showed passion for music early in his childhood. He won his first music competition at the international contest "Scilla", and his first major competition on the television program "Zornaya Rostan". Teo won the Belarusian national song contest and represented Belarus at the Eurovision Song Contest 2014 with the song "Cheesecake". He ultimately finished 16th, receiving a total of 43 points.

== Early life ==
Teo was born as Yuriy Vashchuk in Khidry, Brest, in 1983, as the son of school teacher, Alexey Vashchuk, and culture worker, Tania Vashchuk. In his childhood he developed a passion and interest for music. He received professional music education at the Grodno College of Art and later at the Belarusian State University of Culture and Arts. In 2000, he was invited to work at the National Concert Orchestra of Belarus.

== Career ==
Teo won his first music competition as the winner of the international contest "Scilla", and won his first major competition as the winner of the television program Zornaya Rostan. He works with many foreign and Belarusian musicians as arranger and composer, and, together with L. Shirin, wrote music for Russian movies. He also created the Belarusian television show Forward to the Past and was involved in its musical theme and design. In 2011, Teo, then performing as Yuriy Vashchuk, decided to get a stage name, which he selected via Google search. "I clicked 'T' in Google search and saw it immediately. I like[d] it instantly, and that was it.", he explains. In between 2011 and 2014, he received a series of Lira awards, including "Discovery of the Year" (2011), "Best Arranger" (2012), "Best Author of Music" (2013, together with Leanid Shirin for the song "Russian: Беларусь великая"), "Best Performer of the Year" (2014), "Best Song of the Year ("Cheescake", 2014).

=== Eurovision ===
In 2009, Teo appeared in a duet with Anna Blagova in the national contest, but did not win. Before trying as a solo artist, he served as co-writer of the songs, "Far Away", "All My Love" and "Solayoh", by Alyona Lanskaya, who represented Belarus in 2013. In 2014, Teo won the national contest and represented Belarus in Eurovision. Friend and co-writer, Dmitry Novik, recalled at a press conference in Copenhagen, that the song "Cheesecake", was written just five hours before the deadline, from Saturday to Sunday. The song, however, caused some discussion: In the chorus of the song, the words, "Google Maps" appeared, and the rules of Eurovision states that song lyrics must not promote any registered trademarks. Sietse Bakker, Eurovision Event Coordinator, reported that the issue will be investigated, and the line was eventually changed to "all the maps". The incident was similar to San Marino's case in 2012, when Valentina Monetta was not allowed to use the word "Facebook". At the end of the grand final, Teo finished 16th place, scoring a total of 43 points. He also appeared as a spokesperson for Eurovision Song Contest 2015 and hosted the national selection show for Belarus in Eurovision Song Contest 2018.

== Discography ==
=== Singles ===
List of singles as lead artist, with selected chart positions and certifications, showing year released and album name
Title	Year	Peak chart positions			Certifications	Album
Title	Year	AUT	IRE	UK	Certifications	Album
"Cheesecake"	2014	75	68	140	–	TBA
"Say Me Hello"	2017	–	–	–	–	TBA
"—" denotes a recording that did not chart or was not released in that territory.

Awards and achievements
Preceded by Alyona Lanskaya with "Solayoh"	Belarus in the Eurovision Song Contest; 2014	Succeeded by Uzari and Maimuna with "Time"
