= Napoli (music project) =

Belarusian music project

NAPOLI
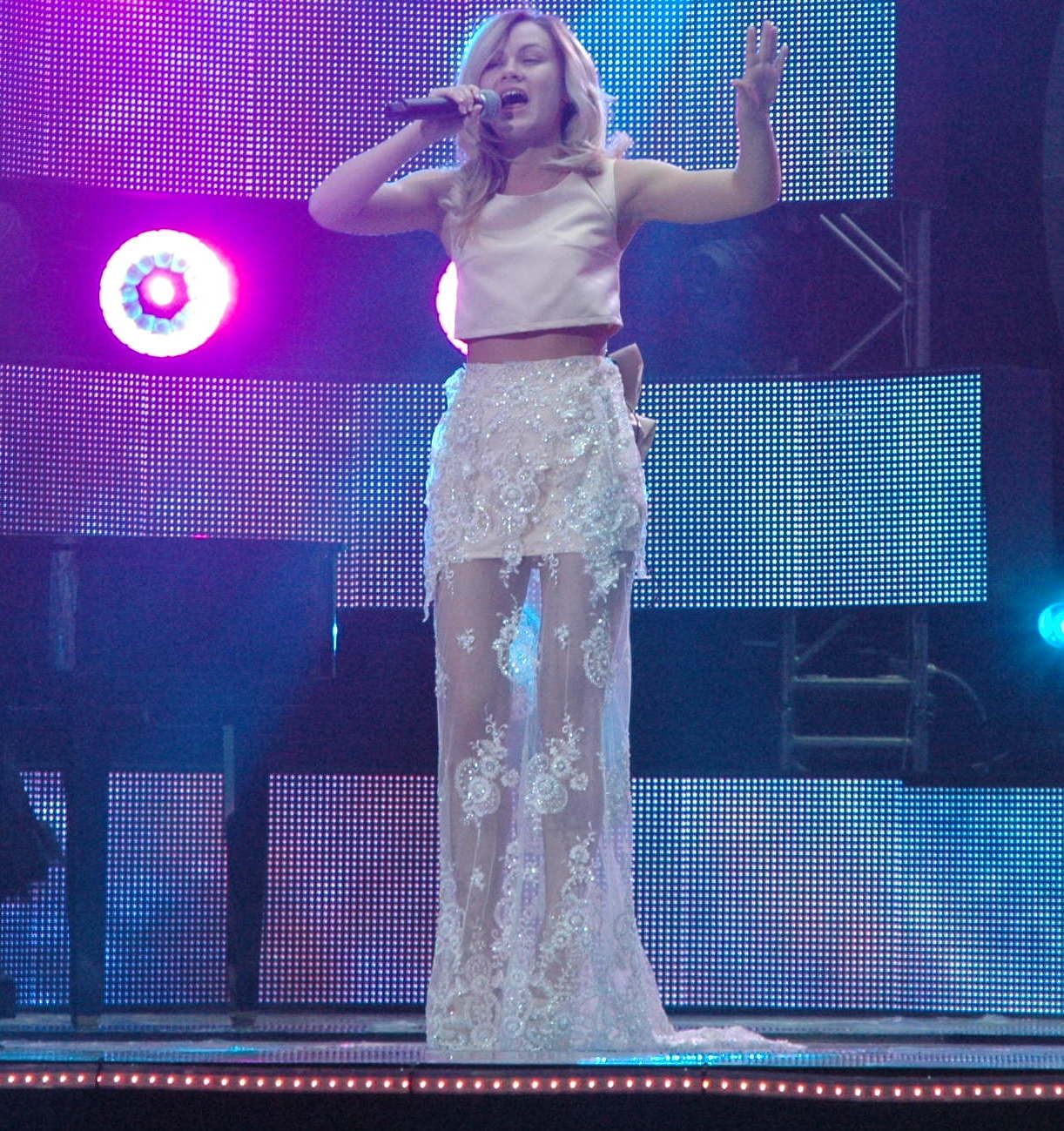
- Napoli during rehearsals for the final of the National Qualifiers for the Eurovision Song Contest 2016.

Background information
- Origin: Minsk, Belarus
- Genres: Pop, contemporary R&B, dance music
- Years active: 2012 – Present
- Members: Olga Shimanskaya
- Past members: Ilya Kravchuk; Ilona Muntyan; Sergey Bolobolov
- Website: fb.com/music.napoli vk.com/napoli.music

NAPOLI (Russian: Наполи), is a Belarusian music project. NAPOLI was formed in 2012 in Minsk by Ilya Kravchuk, Ilona Muntyan and Olga Shimanskaya. Ilya Kravchuk died on 25 March 2014. On 2 July 2014, Sergey Bolobolov became a new member of the group. Since November 2015 NAPOLI is the solo project of Olga Shimanskaya.

NAPOLI participated in Slavianski Bazaar in Vitebsk in 2012. The group also participated in the Belarusian national final for Eurovision 2014 (8th place), Eurovision 2015 (6th place), Eurovision 2016 (2nd place), Eurovision 2017 (5th place), Eurovision 2018 (4th place), Eurovision 2019 (7th place) and Eurovision 2020 (9th place). NAPOLI also took part in the Polish national final for Eurovision 2016 (9th place).

On 30 June 2016, Olga Shimanskaya was announced as the best Belarusian female singer by music channel RUTV:Belarus.

The producer of NAPOLI is Alexander Slutskiy.

== Members ==
- Olga Shimanskaya (2012–present)
- Ilya Kravchuk (2012–2014)
- Ilona Muntyan (2012–2015)
- Sergey Bolobolov (2014–2015)

== Singles ==
=== As lead artist ===
- 2012: "Stolitsa" (Столица, Capital)
- 2012: "Bomba" (Бомба, Bomb)
- 2012: "Ti i ya" (Ты и я, You and me)
- 2012: "Pesnya pro detstvo" (Песня про детство, Song about childhood) (feat. Natali Studio)
- 2013: "Teen spirit anthem"
- 2013: “Esli ti ryadom" (Если ты рядом, If you’re near) (feat. German) (feat. Герман)
- 2013: "Goroda" (Города, Cities)
- 2013: "Phobia" (Фобия, Phobia)
- 2013: "Stay with me"
- 2013: "Noviy god" (Новый год, New year)
- 2014: "Uvidish svet" (Увидишь свет, You’ll see light)
- 2014: "My dreams"
- 2015: "My Universe"
- 2016: "Chas Nadzei" (Час надзей, Время надежд, Time of hope)
- 2016: "Masal Gibi Bu Dünya"
- 2017: "Let’s come together"
- 2018: "Chasing Rushes"
- 2018: "Ne Mogu"
- 2018: "Paroli Kodi"
- 2019: "Let It Go"
- 2019: "Heal"
- 2019: "Feel Up"
- 2020: "Don't Let Me Down"
- 2020: "Hadi Gel"

=== As featured artist ===
- 2016: "Pod solntsem" (Под солнцем, Under the sun) (Alen Hit featuring NAPOLI)

== Videos ==
- 2012: "Ti i ya" (Ты и я, You and me)
- 2012: "Pesnya pro detstvo" (Песня про детство, Song about childhood) (feat. Natali Studio)
- 2013: "Esli ti ryadom" (Если ты рядом, If you’re near) (feat. German) (feat. Герман)
