= Belarus in the Eurovision Song Contest 2007 =

- Eurovision Song Contest 2007
- Participating broadcaster: Belarusian Television and Radio Company (BTRC)
- Country: Belarus
- Selection process: Eurofest 2007
- Selection date: 22 January 2007

Competing entry
- Song: "Work Your Magic"
- Artist: Dmitry Koldun
- Songwriters: Karen Kavaleryan; Philip Kirkorov

Placement
- Semi-final result: Qualified (4th, 176 points)
- Final result: 6th, 145 points

Participation chronology

Belarus was represented at the Eurovision Song Contest 2007 with the song "Work Your Magic", composed by Philip Kirkorov, with lyrics by Karen Kavaleryan, and performed by Dmitry Koldun. The Belarusian participating broadcaster, Belarusian Television and Radio Company (BTRC), selected its entry through a national final.

The national final was a televised production which consisted of a semi-final and a final held on 15 December 2006 and 22 January 2007, respectively. Fifteen competing acts participated in the semi-final where three entries qualified to the final: one entry selected by a public televote and two entries selected by a seven-member jury panel. In the final, the jury panel selected "Work Your Magic" performed by Dmitry Koldun as the winner.

Belarus was competed in the semi-final of the Eurovision Song Contest which took place on 10 May 2007. Performing during the show in position 4, "Work Your Magic" was announced among the top 10 entries of the semi-final and therefore qualified to compete in the final on 12 May. It was later revealed that Belarus placed fourth out of the 28 participating countries in the semi-final with 176 points. In the final, Belarus performed in position 3 and placed sixth out of the 24 participating countries, scoring 145 points.

== Background ==
Prior to the 2007 Contest, Belarusian Television and Radio Company (BTRC) had participated in the Eurovision Song Contest representing Belarus three times since its first entry in 2004. Following the introduction of semi-finals for the 2004, Belarus had yet to qualify to the final. Its best placing in the contest was thirteenth in the semi-final, which it achieved in 2005 with the song "Love Me Tonight" performed by Angelica Agurbash. In 2006, it failed to qualify to the final with the song "Mum" performed by Polina Smolova.

As part of its duties as participating broadcaster, BTRC organises the selection of its entry in the Eurovision Song Contest and broadcasts the event in the country. Since 2004, the broadcaster has organised a national final in order to choose Belarus' entry, a selection procedure that continued for their 2007 entry.

== Before Eurovision ==
=== Eurofest 2007 ===
Eurofest 2007 was the national final format developed by BTRC to select the Belarusian entry for the Eurovision Song Contest 2007. The competition consisted of a semi-final and final held on 15 December 2006 and 22 January 2007, respectively. Both shows were hosted by Denis Kurian and Olga Schlager and broadcast on the First Channel and Belarus TV as well as online via the broadcaster's official website tvr.by.

==== Format ====
The competition consisted of three stages. In the first stage, artists and songwriters had the opportunity to apply for the competition by attending live auditions during designated dates. Fifteen entries were selected to participate in the second stage out of all the submitted applications. The second stage was the televised semi-final which took place on 15 December 2007. Three entries advanced to the final based on a public televote and the votes from an expert jury. The fifteen songs first faced a public televote where one entry qualified to the final. The jury then selected an additional two qualifiers from the remaining entries. The third stage was the final, which took place on 22 January 2007 where the votes from an expert jury determined the winner that would represent Belarus in Helsinki out of the three acts. The competition rules also allowed for the finalists to completely change their candidate songs.

The jury panel that participated in the semi-final and final consisted of:

- Mihail Finberg (chairman of the jury) – director of the Belarusian State Academic Symphony Orchestra
- Vladimir Rylatko – first deputy of the Belarusian Ministry of Culture
- Vasily Rainchik – director of the Youth Variety Theater
- Alexander Tikhanovich – national final project manager
- Denis Shpitalnikov – director of the BTRC music and entertainment programmes directorate
- Anatoly Yarmolenko – director of the ensemble Syabry
- Yadviga Poplavskaya – singer and composer

==== Competing entries ====
Artists and composers were able to submit their applications and entries to the broadcaster between 25 October 2006 and 20 November 2006. At the closing of the deadline, 66 entries were received by the broadcaster. 56 entries were selected for auditions that were held between 29 November and 1 December 2006 at the Youth Variety Theater in Minsk where a jury panel was tasked with selecting fifteen entries to proceed to the televised national final. The jury consisted of Mihail Finberg, Vladimir Rylatko, Vasily Rainchik, Alexander Tikhanovich, Denis Shpitalnikov, Anatoly Yarmolenko and Yadviga Poplavskaya. The selected semi-finalists were announced on 5 December 2006.

==== Semi-final ====
The televised semi-final took place on 15 December 2006 at the Republic Palace in Minsk. Prior to the semi-final, a draw for the running order took place on 14 December 2006. Three songs qualified to the final. The fifteen competing entries first faced a public televote where one song advanced. An additional two qualifiers were selected from the remaining fourteen entries by the votes of jury members made up of music professionals.

In addition to the performances from the competitors, the show featured guest performances by 2003 Belarusian Junior Eurovision contestant Volha Satsiuk and 2006 Belarusian Eurovision contestant Polina Smolova.

Public vote qualifier Jury qualifier

Semi-final – 15 December 2006
R/O	Artist	Song	Songwriter(s)	Televote	Place	Result
1	Anna Sharkunova	"Sorvatsya i vniz"	Vitaly Penzin, Vladimir Kubyshkin	553	8	—N/a
2	Borneo	"Fingertips"	Aleksey Charykov	693	6	—N/a
3	Dmitry Koldun	"Angel mechty"	Dmitry Koldun, Denis Lis	4,412	1	Qualified
4	Lena	"Call Me (September 11)"	Sergey Zhdanovich, Evgeny Melnikov	467	9	—N/a
5	Svayaki	"Smačny miodzik" (Смачны мёдзік)	Aleksey Zaitsev	1,149	5	—N/a
6	Irina Yarina	"Korotkiy dozhd" (Кроткий дождь)	Leonid Shirin, Yarik Rakitin	81	14	—N/a
7	Dali	"Mechtai so mnoy" (Мечтай со мной)	Victor Rudenko	142	13	—N/a
8	Natalia Tamelo	"So Badly High"	Leonid Shirin, Andrey Kostyugov	585	7	—N/a
9	Litesound	"Summer Trip"	Dmitry Karyakin, Vladimir Karyakin	1,999	2	—N/a
10	The Project	"S.u.p.e.r. S.t.a.r."	Bagrat Vartanyan	1,288	4	Qualified
11	Oleg Karpenko	"I Feel Good Tonight"	Roman Kozyrev	39	15	—N/a
12	New Generation	"Belarus"	Aleksey Kravchenko	171	12	—N/a
13	Diana Gurtskaya	"How Long"	Karen Kavaleryan, Kim Breitburg	1,582	3	Qualified
14	Natalia Lapteva and XXXLight	"I Don't Know"	Natalia Lapteva	334	11	—N/a
15	Victor Pshenichniy	"Sooner or Later"	Alexander Nabeev	462	10	—N/a

==== Final ====
The televised final took place on 22 January 2007 at the Sports Palace in Minsk. Prior to the final, Dmitry Koldun opted to change his candidate song. The votes of jury members made up of music professionals selected the song "Work Your Magic" performed by Koldun as the winner.

In addition to the performances from the competitors, the show featured guest performances by former Belarusian Eurovision contestants Aleksandra and Konstantin (2004), Angelica Agurbash (2005) and Polina Smolova (2006), former Belarusian Junior Eurovision contestants Ksenia Sitnik (2005) and Andrey Kunets (2006), former Eurovision Song Contest winners Carola (1991) and Marie N (2002), 2006 Latvian Eurovision contestants Cosmos and 2006 Russian Eurovision contestant Dima Bilan.

Final – 22 January 2007
R/O	Artist	Song	Songwriter(s)
1	Diana Gurtskaya	"How Long"	Karen Kavaleryan, Kim Breitburg
2	Dmitry Koldun	"Work Your Magic"	Karen Kavaleryan, Philipp Kirkorov
3	The Project	"S.u.p.e.r. S.t.a.r."	Bagrat Vartanyan

=== Preparation ===
The official music video of the song, filmed in February 2007 and directed by Oleg Gusev, was presented to the public on 8 March 2007 on the First Channel. The concept of the video was based on the music video of the song "Jaded" by American band Aerosmith.

=== Promotion ===
Dmitry Koldun made several appearances across Europe to specifically promote "Work Your Magic" as the Belarusian Eurovision entry. Between 3 February and 5 March, Dmitry Koldun performed "Work Your Magic" during the Greek, Irish, Macedonian, Montenegrin, and Spanish national finals for Eurovision, and the presentation shows of the Cypriot and Bosnian entries. In February and April, Koldun participated in promotional activities in Russia where he performed the Russian version of "Work Your Magic", titled "Day mne silu", during the Channel One programmes Novye pesni o glavnom and Vysshaya liga, as well as during the NTV programme Glavniy Geroy. Between 13 and 15 April, Koldun performed during events which were held in Antwerp and Brussels, Belgium, as well as appearing during the RTL 4 programme Life & Cooking in The Netherlands. In addition to his international appearances, Dmitry Koldun also participated in promotional activities in Belarus where he performed during the Za Nezavisimuyu Belarus event, which was at the Minsk Hero City Obelisk in Minsk on 25 March.

== At Eurovision ==
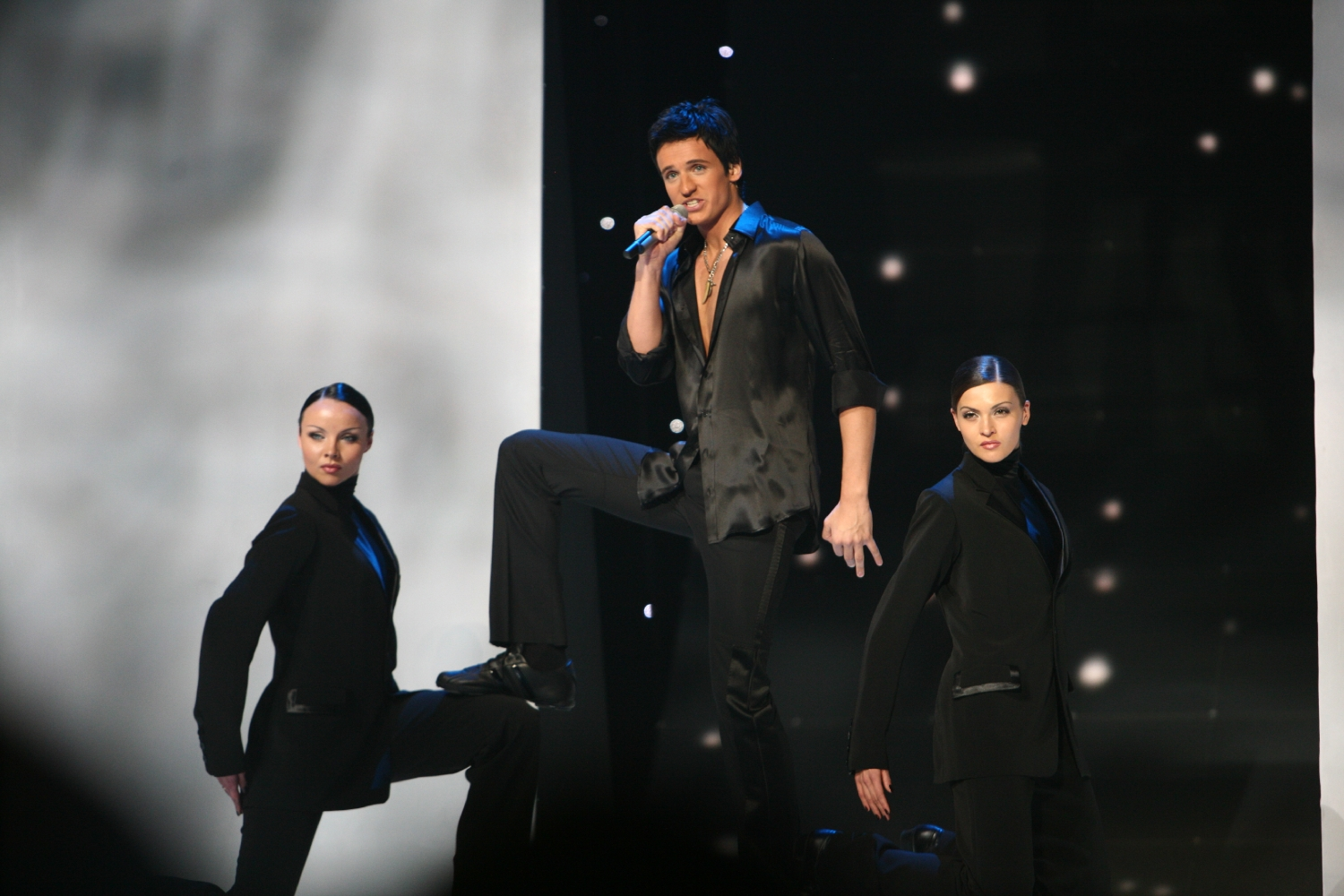
Koldun performing during the Eurovision Song Contest 2007

According to Eurovision rules, all nations with the exceptions of the host country, the "Big Four" (France, Germany, Spain and the United Kingdom) and the ten highest placed finishers in the 2006 contest are required to qualify from the semi-final in order to compete for the final; the top ten countries from each semi-final progress to the final. On 12 March 2007, a special allocation draw was held which determined the running order for the semi-final on 10 May 2007. Belarus was drawn to perform in position 4, following the entry from Cyprus and before the entry from Iceland.

For the Eurovision Song Contest, Dmitry Koldun performed under the artistic name of Koldun, which is the Russian word for "magician". Accompanying Koldun on stage were two male dancers: Alexandr Bodyanski and Fredrik Olofsson, and two female dancers: Natalia and Ilona Donchenko, along with Mariam Merabova providing backing vocals.

At the end of the semi-final, Belarus was announced as having finished in the top ten and subsequently qualifying for the grand final. This marked the first time that Belarus qualified to the final of the Eurovision Song Contest from a semi-final since the introduction of semi-finals in 2004. It was later revealed that the Belarus placed fourth in the semi-final, receiving a total of 176 points.

Shortly after the semi-final, a winners' press conference was held for the ten qualifying countries. As part of this press conference, the qualifying artists took part in a draw to determine the running order of the final. This draw was done in the order the countries appeared in the semi-final running order. Belarus was drawn to perform in position 3, following the entry from Spain and before the entry from Ireland. Belarus placed sixth in the final, scoring 145 points, which is the best result for Belarus to date.

=== Voting ===
Below is a breakdown of points awarded to Belarus and awarded by Belarus in the semi-final and grand final of the contest. The nation awarded its 12 points to Moldova in the semi-final and to Russia in the final of the contest.

==== Points awarded to Belarus ====
Points awarded to Belarus (Semi-final)
Score	Country
12 points	Armenia; Israel; Moldova; Russia; Ukraine
10 points	Cyprus; Latvia; Lithuania
8 points	
7 points	Estonia; Greece; Malta
6 points	Bulgaria; Ireland
5 points	Czech Republic; Turkey
4 points	Albania; Georgia; Iceland; Macedonia; Montenegro; Poland; Serbia
3 points	Norway; Romania; Sweden
2 points	Bosnia and Herzegovina; Hungary
1 point	Denmark; Portugal

Points awarded to Belarus (Final)
Score	Country
12 points	Israel; Russia; Ukraine
10 points	Armenia; Malta; Moldova
8 points	Georgia; Latvia
7 points	Estonia; Lithuania; Macedonia; Poland
6 points	Cyprus
5 points	Greece
4 points	Bosnia and Herzegovina; Hungary; Iceland
3 points	Montenegro
2 points	Albania; Czech Republic; Serbia
1 point	Bulgaria; Portugal; Romania

==== Points awarded by Belarus ====
Points awarded by Belarus (Semi-final)
Score	Country
12 points	Moldova
10 points	Serbia
8 points	Georgia
7 points	Portugal
6 points	Slovenia
5 points	Poland
4 points	Andorra
3 points	Iceland
2 points	Latvia
1 point	Hungary

Points awarded by Belarus (Final)
Score	Country
12 points	Russia
10 points	Ukraine
8 points	Moldova
7 points	Serbia
6 points	Georgia
5 points	Armenia
4 points	Slovenia
3 points	Greece
2 points	Lithuania
1 point	Finland
