= Ruslan (given name) =

- Gender: Male

Origin
- Origin: Turkic
- Meaning: lion
- Region of origin: Central Asia, Russia

Ruslan (Russian and Ukrainian: Руслан [rʊsˈɫan]) is a masculine given name, a variant of the Turkic word aslan or arslan, meaning 'lion'. The name was popularized in the Russian Empire by the poem of Alexander Pushkin, Ruslan and Ludmila. Earlier, a version Yeruslan was attested. There is no established opinion whether one name was derived from another.

The feminine version is Ruslana.

== People ==
- Ruslaan Mumtaz (born 1982), an Indian actor
- Ruslan Abdulgani (1914–2005), Indonesian diplomat and Foreign Minister (1956–1957)
- Ruslan Abışov (born 1987), Azerbaijani footballer
- Ruslan Agalarov (born 1974), Uzbekistani football manager
- Ruslan Akhmadullin (born 1982), Russian ice hockey player
- Ruslan Alekhno (born 1981), Russian and Belarusian singer
- Ruslan Aushev (born 1954), Soviet General and former President of Ingushetia
- Ruslan Baltiev (born 1978), Kazakh footballer
- Ruslan Beslaneyev (born 1982), Russian footballer
- Ruslan Chagaev (born 1978), an Uzbekistani professional boxer
- Ruslan Fedotenko (born 1979), Ukrainian professional hockey player
- Ruslan Gelayev (1964–2004), commander in the Chechen separatist movement against Russia
- Ruslan Glebov (born 1987), Ukrainian orienteer
- Ruslan Honcharov (born 1973), Ukrainian figure skater
- Ruslan Kapantsow (born 1981), Belarusian footballer
- Ruslan Karaev (born 1983), a Russian kickboxer and martial artist
- Ruslan Khairov (born 1981), Russian-born Azerbaijani boxer
- Ruslan Khasbulatov (1942–2023), a Russian economist and politician
- Ruslan Kogan (born 1982), founder and director of Kogan Technologies
- Ruslan Lyubarskyi (born 1973), Ukrainian footballer
- Ruslan Majidov (born 1985), Azerbaijani footballer
- Ruslan Malinovskyi (born 1993), Ukrainian footballer
- Ruslan Mamutov (1993–2022), Ukrainian footballer
- Ruslan Mashchenko (born 1971), a Russian hurdler
- Ruslan Maynov (born 1976), Bulgarian singer
- Ruslan Medzhitov (born 1966), Professor of Immunobiology at Yale University
- Ruslan Mingazow (born 1991), Turkmenistani footballer
- Ruslan Nurudinov (born 1991), an Uzbekistani weightlifter
- Ruslan Pidhornyy (born 1977), Ukrainian road bicycle racer
- Ruslan Ponomariov (born 1983), a Ukrainian chess player and former FIDE world champion
- Ruslan Provodnikov (born 1984), a Russian boxer
- Ruslan Rotan (born 1981), a Ukrainian football player
- Ruslan Salei (1974–2011), a Belarusian professional hockey defenceman
- Ruslan Salakhutdinov
- Ruslan Salakhutdinov (footballer)
- Ruslan Sidiki (born 1988), Russian-Italian anarchist who was sentenced to 29 years imprisonment for a drone strike on a Russian airbase
- Ruslan Sirota (born 1980), a jazz, fusion and funk/R&B pianist and keyboardist
- Ruslan Solyanyk (1984–2024), a Ukrainian footballer
- Ruslan Yamadayev (1961–2008), a Chechen military leader and politician
- Ruslan Zakharov (born 1987), Russian speed skater

== Fictional characters ==
- Ruslan from Ruslan and Ludmila, 1820 poem by Alexander Pushkin
- Ruslan the guard dog, the protagonist of Faithful Ruslan by Georgi Vladimov

== See also ==
- Arslan
- Aslan (disambiguation)
- Ruslan (disambiguation)
- Ruslan and Ludmila (disambiguation)
- Ruslanas, Lithuanized form of the name
- Yeruslan (disambiguation)

== Sources ==
- Баландин, А. И.; Гацак, В. М. (1977). Фольклор: Поэтическая система: [Сборник статей]. М.: Наука.
- Баскаков, Н. А. (1979). Русские фамилии тюркского происхождения. М.: Наука.
- Кусимова, Т. (1991). В мире имён. Словарь башкирских имён. Уфа: Башкирское книжное издательство. p. 192.
- Надель-Червинская, М.; Червинский, П. (2013). Энциклопедический мир Владимира Даля. Книга вторая (в 2-х томах): Дикие звери. Vol. 2. Часть первая (2-е изд ed.). Тернополь: Крок. ISBN 978-617-692-069-4.
- Намитокова, Р. Ю., ed. (2012). Сводный словарь личных имен народов Северного Кавказа. М.: ФЛИНТА, Наука. p. 584.
- Никонов, В. А. (1988). Ищем имя. М.: Советская Россия.
- Рылов, Ю. А. (2006). Имена собственные в европейских языках. Романская и русская антропонимика. Курс лекций по межкультурной коммуникации. М.: АСТ, Восток – Запад.
- Саттаров, Г.Ф. (Гумар Саттар - Мулилле) (1998). "Татар исемнәре ни сөйли?" "О чем говорят татарские имена?". Полный толковый словарь татарских личных имен. Казань: Редакционно-издательское объединение "РАННУР". p. 486 (30 п.л.).
- Тумашева, Д. Г. (1984). Татарский язык: лексическая и грамматическая семантика. Казань: Издательство Казанского университета.
- Шумовский Т. А. (2004). Странствия слов. СПб.: Протей.
