= Belarus in the Eurovision Song Contest 2009 =

- Eurovision Song Contest 2009
- Participating broadcaster: Belarusian Television and Radio Company (BTRC)
- Country: Belarus
- Selection process: Eurofest 2009
- Selection date: 19 January 2009

Competing entry
- Song: "Eyes That Never Lie"
- Artist: Petr Elfimov
- Songwriters: Petr Elfimov; Valery Prokhozhy

Placement
- Semi-final result: Failed to qualify (13th)

Participation chronology

Belarus was represented at the Eurovision Song Contest 2009 with the song "Eyes That Never Lie", composed by Petr Elfimov, with lyrics by Valery Prokhozhy, and performed by Elfimov himself. The Belarusian participating broadcaster, Belarusian Television and Radio Company (BTRC), selected its entry for the contest through the national final Eurofest 2009. The national final was a televised production which consisted of a semi-final and a final held on 15 December 2008 and 19 January 2009, respectively. Fifteen competing acts participated in the semi-final where the top five entries as determined by a jury panel qualified to the final. In the final, public televoting selected "Eyes That Never Lie" performed by Petr Elfimov as the winner with 11,475 votes.

Belarus was drawn to compete in the first semi-final of the Eurovision Song Contest which took place on 12 May 2009. Performing during the show in position 4, "Eyes That Never Lie" was not announced among the 10 qualifying entries of the first semi-final and therefore did not qualify to compete in the final. It was later revealed that Belarus placed thirteenth out of the 18 participating countries in the semi-final with 25 points.

== Background ==
Prior to the 2009 contest, Belarusian Television and Radio Company (BTRC) had participated in the Eurovision Song Contest representing Belarus five times since its first entry in 2004. Its best placing in the contest was sixth, achieved in 2007 with the song "Work Your Magic" performed by Dmitry Koldun. Following the introduction of semi-finals for the 2004 contest, Belarus had only managed to qualify to the final once. In 2008, "Hasta la vista" performed by Ruslan Alekhno failed to qualify to the final.

As part of its duties as participating broadcaster, BTRC organises the selection of its entry in the Eurovision Song Contest and broadcasts the event in the country. Since 2004, the broadcaster has organised a national final in order to choose its entry, a selection procedure that continued for its 2009 entry.

== Before Eurovision ==
=== Eurofest 2009 ===
Eurofest 2009 was the national final format developed by BTRC to select its entry for the Eurovision Song Contest 2009. The competition consisted of a semi-final and final held on 15 December 2008 and 19 January 2009, respectively. Both shows were broadcast on the First Channel and Belarus TV as well as online via the broadcaster's official website tvr.by.

==== Format ====
The competition consisted of three stages. In the first stage, artists and songwriters had the opportunity to apply for the competition by attending live auditions during designated dates. Fifteen entries were selected to participate in the second stage out of all the submitted applications. The second stage was the televised semi-final which took place on 15 December 2008. Five entries advanced to the final based on the votes from an expert jury. The third stage was the final, which took place on 19 January 2009 where public televoting determined the winner that would represent Belarus in Moscow out of the five acts. The competition rules also allowed for the finalists to completely change their candidate songs.

==== Competing entries ====
Artists and composers were able to submit their applications and entries to the broadcaster between 5 October 2008 and 20 November 2008. At the closing of the deadline, 118 entries were received by the broadcaster, 17 of which were submitted without an artist attached. 98 entries were selected for auditions that were held between 3 and 5 December 2008 at the Youth Variety Theater in Minsk where a jury panel was tasked with selecting up to fifteen entries to proceed to the televised national final. The jury consisted of Anatoly Yarmolenko (chairman of the jury, director of the ensemble Syabry), Inna Afanasieva (singer), Yadviga Poplavskaya (singer), Vasily Rainchik (director of the Youth Variety Theater), Leonid Shirin (composer), Alexander Mezhenny (choreographer), Vladimir Rylatko (first deputy of the Belarusian Ministry of Culture), Denis Shpitalnikov (director of the BTRC music and entertainment programmes directorate) and Alexander Kapenkin (deputy director of the First Channel). The selected semi-finalists were announced on 5 December 2008.

==== Semi-final ====
The televised semi-final took place on 15 December 2008 at the BTRC studios in Minsk, hosted by Denis Kurian. The votes of jury members made up of music professionals selected the top five songs to qualify to the final. The jury consisted of Anatoly Yarmolenko, Inna Afanasieva, Yadviga Poplavskaya, Vasily Rainchik, Leonid Shirin, Alexander Mezhenny, Vladimir Rylatko, Denis Shpitalnikov and Alexander Kapenkin.

Semi-final – 15 December 2008
R/O	Artist	Song	Songwriter(s)	Result
1	Alexei Krechet	"Joy and Freedom"	Alexei Krechet, Vadim Ruzov	—N/a
2	Petr Elfimov	"Eyes That Never Lie"	Petr Elfimov, Valery Prokhozhy	Qualified
3	Cola feat. Lidiya Zablotskaya	"Gudok" (Гудок)	Valeriy Shevchenko, Vladimir Gridin	—N/a
4	SingeRin	"Don't Think About It"	Ekaterina Dudich	—N/a
5	Dakota	"Ciabie zabyvaju" (Цябе забываю)	Rita Dakota, Gleb Lobodenko	—N/a
6	The Champions	"Shake It, Europe"	Olisa Emeka Orakposim, Vyacheslav Lyschik	—N/a
7	Alex Patlis Band	"Kto skazal?" (Кто сказал?)	Alex Patlis	—N/a
8	Litesound feat. Dakota	"Carry On"	Vladimir Karyakin, Dmitry Karyakin	Qualified
9	Dominica	"This Is My Day"	Sergey Sukhomlin, Andrey Kostyugov	Qualified
10	Dyadya Vanya	"Nasha Belarussia" (Наша Беларуссия)	Ivan Vabishchevich	—N/a
11	Veter v Golove	"Or or And"	Alexandra Zaharik, Gleb Galushko	Qualified
12	Anna Blagova and Yuriy Vashchuk	"Behind"	Yuriy Vashchuk, Anna Zhilina	—N/a
13	Gunesh	"Fantastic Girl"	Gunesh Abasova, Marina Khaitbayeva	Qualified
14	Victoria Belova	"Don't Give Up From Love"	Victoria Belova, Andrey Klimka	—N/a
15	Venera	"Big Game"	Alexander Nabeev	—N/a

==== Final ====
The televised final took place on 19 January 2009 at the Sports Palace in Minsk, hosted by Anastasiya Tikhanovich and Dmitry Koldun, who represented Belarus in 2007. Prior to the final, Veter v Golove opted to change their candidate song. Public televoting exclusively selected the song "Eyes That Never Lie" performed by Petr Elfimov as the winner.

In addition to the performances from the competitors, the show featured guest performances by the host Dmitry Koldun, Ruslan Alehno, who represented Belarus in 2008, and Ani Lorak, who represented Ukraine in 2008.

Final – 19 January 2009
R/O	Artist	Song	Songwriter(s)	Televote	Place
1	Gunesh	"Fantastic Girl"	Gunesh Abasova, Marina Khaitbayeva	7,949	2
2	Petr Elfimov	"Eyes That Never Lie"	Petr Elfimov, Valery Prokhozhy	11,475	1
3	Litesound feat. Dakota	"Carry On"	Vladimir Karyakin, Dmitry Karyakin	4,385	3
4	Dominica	"This Is My Day"	Sergey Sukhomlin, Andrey Kostyugov	1,225	5
5	Veter v Golove	"Špacyrujem" (Шпацыруем)	Alexandra Zaharik, Andrey Zhukov, Vitya Bardak	2,804	4

=== Preparation ===
Following Petr Elfimov's victory at Eurofest 2009, the singer's producer Tatyana Kosmacheva stated that "Eyes That Never Lie" would undergo changes for the Eurovision Song Contest. The revamped version of the song was produced at the Finnvox Studios in Helsinki by Mikka Karmila and Tero Kinnunen, the latter of whom has worked with the band Nightwish. The official music video, directed by Anastasiya Tikhanovich and filmed at the National Museum of Folk Architecture and Life in Pyrohiv, was released on 26 April.

=== Promotion ===
Petr Elfimov made several appearances across Europe to specifically promote "Eyes That Never Lie" as the Belarusian Eurovision entry. On 18 February, Petr Elfimov performed the revamped version of "Eyes That Never Lie" during the Greek Eurovision national final. On 21 February, Elfimov performed during the Macedonian Eurovision national final Skopje Fest 2009. On 8 March, Elfimov performed during the Ukrainian Eurovision national final. On 4 April, Elfimov completed promotional activities in Armenia where he performed the Russian version of "Eyes That Never Lie", titled "Vzglyad lyubvi", during the Armenian Music Awards 2009. Elfimov had also planned to take part in promotional events in April which was held in London, Amsterdam, and Brussels, however, his participation was later cancelled.

== At Eurovision ==
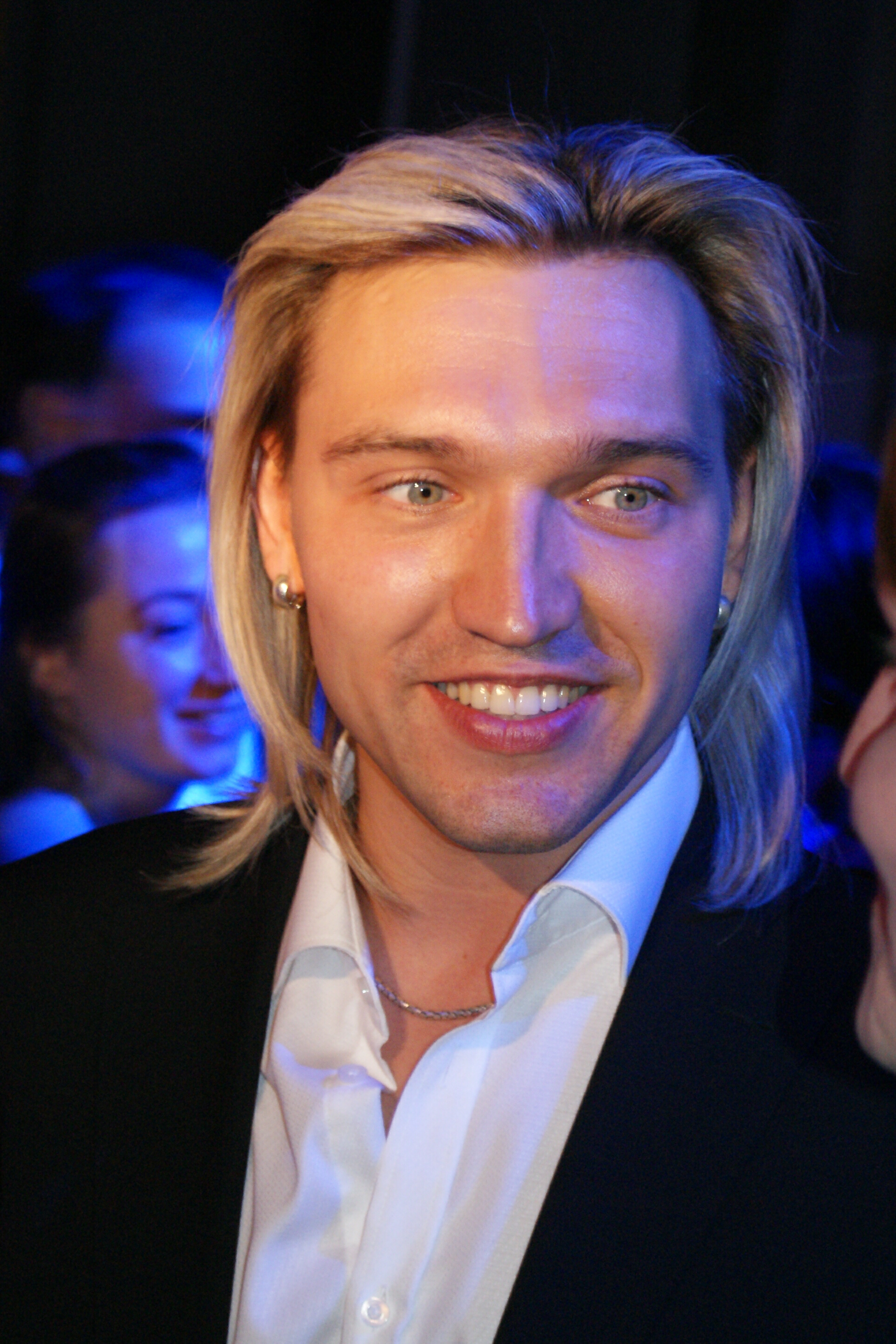
Petr Elfimov at the Eurovision Song Contest 2009

According to Eurovision rules, all nations with the exceptions of the host country and the "Big Four" (France, Germany, Spain and the United Kingdom) are required to qualify from one of two semi-finals in order to compete for the final; the top nine countries from the televoting progress to the final, and a tenth qualifier was determined by the back-up juries. The European Broadcasting Union (EBU) split up the competing countries into six different pots based on voting patterns from previous contests, with countries with favourable voting histories put into the same pot. On 30 January 2009, a special allocation draw was held which placed each country into one of the two semi-finals. Belarus was placed into the first semi-final, to be held on 12 May 2009. The running order for the semi-finals was decided through another draw on 16 March 2009 and Belarus was set to perform in position 4, following the entry from Belgium and before the entry from Sweden.

The two semi-finals and the final were broadcast in Belarus on the First Channel with commentary by Denis Kurian and Alexander Tikhanovich. BTRC appointed Ekaterina Litvinova as its spokesperson to announce the Belarusian votes during the final.

=== Semi-final ===
Petr Elfimov took part in technical rehearsals on 3 and 7 May, followed by dress rehearsals on 11 and 12 May. The Belarusian performance featured Elfimov performing on stage wearing a white leather costume, together with a guitarist and a dancer who stood on a set of steps covered in a white sheet which blazes a long trail. The stage colours were green and white. The performance also featured the use of a wind machine. Elfimov was joined by three on-stage backing vocalists: Anton Toimentsau, Philip Mazurov and Yan Zhenchak. The guitarist and dancer that accompanied Elfimov on stage were Dmitry Mikulich and Ekaterina Matskevich, respectively.

At the end of the show, Belarus was not announced among the 10 qualifying entries in the first semi-final and therefore failed to qualify to compete in the final. It was later revealed that Belarus placed thirteenth in the semi-final, receiving a total of 25 points.

=== Voting ===
The voting system for 2009 involved each country awarding points from 1-8, 10 and 12, with the points in the final being decided by a combination of 50% national jury and 50% televoting. Each participating broadcaster assembled a jury of five music industry professionals who were citizens of the country they represented. This jury judged each entry based on: vocal capacity; the stage performance; the song's composition and originality; and the overall impression by the act. In addition, no member of a national jury was permitted to be related in any way to any of the competing acts in such a way that they cannot vote impartially and independently.

Below is a breakdown of points awarded to Belarus and awarded by Belarus in the first semi-final and grand final of the contest. The nation awarded its 12 points to Iceland in the semi-final and to Norway in the final of the contest.

==== Points awarded to Belarus ====
Points awarded to Belarus (Semi-final 1)
Score	Country
12 points	
10 points	
8 points	
7 points	
6 points	Macedonia
5 points	
4 points	Armenia; Finland; Israel
3 points	
2 points	Montenegro
1 point	Bulgaria; Czech Republic; Iceland; Malta; Sweden

==== Points awarded by Belarus ====
Points awarded by Belarus (Semi-final 1)
Score	Country
12 points	Iceland
10 points	Armenia
8 points	Malta
7 points	Sweden
6 points	Turkey
5 points	Bosnia and Herzegovina
4 points	Israel
3 points	Montenegro
2 points	Switzerland
1 point	Romania

Points awarded by Belarus (Final)
Score	Country
12 points	Norway
10 points	Azerbaijan
8 points	Russia
7 points	France
6 points	Ukraine
5 points	Greece
4 points	Estonia
3 points	United Kingdom
2 points	Iceland
1 point	Armenia

==== Detailed voting results ====
Detailed voting results from Belarus (Final)
R/O	Country	Results			Points
R/O	Country	Jury	Televoting	Combined	Points
01	Lithuania		2	2	
02	Israel	1		1	
03	France	8	4	12	7
04	Sweden				
05	Croatia				
06	Portugal				
07	Iceland		6	6	2
08	Greece	10	1	11	5
09	Armenia	2	3	5	1
10	Russia	4	8	12	8
11	Azerbaijan	5	10	15	10
12	Bosnia and Herzegovina				
13	Moldova	3		3	
14	Malta				
15	Estonia		7	7	4
16	Denmark				
17	Germany				
18	Turkey				
19	Albania				
20	Norway	12	12	24	12
21	Ukraine	6	5	11	6
22	Romania				
23	United Kingdom	7		7	3
24	Finland				
25	Spain				
