= Belarus in the Eurovision Song Contest 2006 =

- Eurovision Song Contest 2006
- Participating broadcaster: Belarusian Television and Radio Company (BTRC)
- Country: Belarus
- Selection process: Doroga na Evrovidenie
- Selection date: 27 February 2006

Competing entry
- Song: "Mum"
- Artist: Polina Smolova
- Songwriters: Sergey Sukhomlin; Andrey Kostyugov

Placement
- Semi-final result: Failed to qualify (22nd)

Participation chronology

Belarus was represented at the Eurovision Song Contest 2006 with the song "Mum", composed by Sergey Sukhomlin, with lyrics by Andrey Kostyugov and performed by Polina Smolova. The Belarusian participating broadcaster, Belarusian Television and Radio Company (BTRC), selected its entry through the national final Doroga na Evrovidenie.

The national final consisted of two rounds held on 10 and 27 February 2006, respectively. In the first round, fifteen competing acts participated in a televised production where public televoting selected the top three entries to qualify to the final. In the final, "Mama" performed by Polina Smolova was initially selected as the winner by a jury panel. The song was later retitled for the Eurovision Song Contest as "Mum".

Belarus was competed in the semi-final of the Eurovision Song Contest which took place on 18 May 2006. Performing during the show in position 5, "Mum" was not announced among the top 10 entries of the semi-final and therefore did not qualify to compete in the final. It was later revealed that Belarus placed twenty-second out of the 23 participating countries in the semi-final with 10 points.

== Background ==
Prior to the 2006 contest, Belarusian Television and Radio Company (BTRC) had participated in the Eurovision Song Contest representing Belarus two times since its first entry in 2004. Following the introduction of semi-finals for the 2004 contest, Belarus had yet to qualify to the final. Its best placing in the contest was thirteenth in the semi-final, which it achieved in 2005 with the song "Love Me Tonight" performed by Angelica Agurbash.

As part of its duties as participating broadcaster, BTRC organises the selection of its entry in the Eurovision Song Contest and broadcasts the event in the country. Since 2004, the broadcaster has organised a national final in order to choose Belarus' entry, a selection procedure that continued for their 2006 entry.

== Before Eurovision ==
=== Doroga na Evrovidenie ===
Doroga na Evrovidenie was the national final format developed by BTRC to select the Belarusian entry for the Eurovision Song Contest 2006. Artists and composers were able to submit their applications and entries to the broadcaster between 29 November 2005 and 12 January 2006. At the closing of the deadline, 73 entries were received by the broadcaster. A jury panel was tasked with selecting up to fifteen entries to proceed to the televised national final. The jury consisted of Mihail Finberg (chairman of the jury, director of the State Academic Choir), Valeriy Grebenko (head of the BTRC sound engineers department), Oleg Eliseenkov (composer), Eduard Zaritsky (composer), Leonid Zakhlevny (composer, artistic director of the ensemble Byasyeda), Valeriy Pestov (director of programme production of BTRC), Vasily Rainchik (director of the Youth Variety Theater) and Vladimir Ugolnik (head of the variety arts department at the Belarusian State University of Culture and Arts). Fifteen finalists were selected and announced on 18 January 2006. Prior to the national final, Polina Smolova opted to change her candidate song from "Sait odinochestva" to "Mama".

The national final consisted of two rounds. The first round took place on 10 February 2006 at the Republic Palace in Minsk, hosted by Denis Kurian and was televised on the First Channel as well as Belarus TV and online via the broadcaster's official website tvr.by. Prior to the show, a draw for the running order took place on 24 January 2006. Public televoting exclusively selected the top three songs to qualify to the second round. The second round took place on 27 February 2006 at the Youth Variety Theater in Minsk where the votes of jury members made up of music professionals selected "Mama" performed by Polina Smolova as the winner. The jury consisted of Mihail Finberg, Valeriy Grebenko, Oleg Eliseenkov, Eduard Zaritsky, Leonid Zakhlevny, Valeriy Pestov, Vasily Rainchik, Vladimir Ugolnik and members of the national final organising committee.

First Round – 10 February 2006
R/O	Artist	Song	Songwriter(s)	Televote	Place
1	Prima-Vera	"I Can See the Rising Sun"	Leonid Shirin, Andrey Kostyugov	271	12
2	Dali	"Europe's Heart's Groove"	Victor Rudenko	334	10
3	Janet	"Mysterious Logic"	Gennady Melnikov, Janet Buterus	538	7
4	Elena Grishanova	"You Can't Stop This Dance"	Elena Grishanova, Vladimir Blagush, Pavel Klyshevskiy	2,839	2
5	Gosia Andrzejewicz	"Dangerous Game"	Gosia Andrzejewicz, Artur Kamiński	218	14
6	Alexandra Gaiduk	"An A-Class Face"	Alexandra Gaiduk	112	15
7	Lyavony	"Come Back"	Mikhail Goldenkov, Pavel Zayats	2,597	3
8	Tyana	"You Never Know"	Oleg Averin, Y. Kashin	290	11
9	Dmitry Koldun	"May Be"	Dmitry Koldun	431	8
10	Gunesh	"Connect the Hearts"	Sergey Sukhomlin	1,973	4
11	Lesha Kodush	"Baby-Sitter"	Oleg Eliseenkov, Svetlana Sologub	390	9
12	Irina Dorofeeva	"Vyshita sorochka" (Вышита сорочка)	Valentina Polikanina, Sergei Tolkunov	784	5
13	Litesound	"My Faith"	Vladimir Karyakin, Dmitry Karyakin	740	6
14	Ruslan Musvidas and Svetlana Vezhnovets	"Proch s glaz" (Прочь с глаз)	Veronika Musvidas	257	13
15	Polina Smolova	"Mama"	Andrey Kostyugov, Sergey Sukhomlin	3,816	1

Second Round – 27 February 2006
Artist	Song
Elena Grishanova	"You Can't Stop This Dance"
Lyavony	"Come Back"
Polina Smolova	"Mama"

== At Eurovision ==
According to Eurovision rules, all nations with the exceptions of the host country, the "Big Four" (France, Germany, Spain and the United Kingdom) and the ten highest placed finishers in the 2005 contest are required to qualify from the semi-final in order to compete for the final; the top ten countries from the semi-final progress to the final. On 21 March 2006, an allocation draw was held which determined the running order for the semi-final on 18 May 2006. Belarus was drawn to perform in position 5, following the entry from Andorra and before the entry from Albania. At the end of the semi-final, Belarus was not announced among the top 10 entries in the semi-final and therefore failed to qualify to compete in the final. It was later revealed that the Belarus placed twenty-second in the semi-final, receiving a total of 10 points.

The semi-final and the final were broadcast in Belarus on the First Channel with commentary by Denis Dudinskiy. The Belarusian spokesperson, who announced the Belarusian votes during the final, was Corrianna.

=== Voting ===
Below is a breakdown of points awarded to Belarus and awarded by Belarus in the semi-final and grand final of the contest. The nation awarded its 12 points to Russia in the semi-final and the final of the contest.

==== Points awarded to Belarus ====
Points awarded to Belarus (Semi-final)
Score	Country
12 points	
10 points	
8 points	
7 points	
6 points	Russia
5 points	
4 points	
3 points	Moldova
2 points	
1 point	Ukraine

==== Points awarded by Belarus ====
Points awarded by Belarus (Semi-final)
Score	Country
12 points	Russia
10 points	Ukraine
8 points	Finland
7 points	Armenia
6 points	Lithuania
5 points	Sweden
4 points	Poland
3 points	Bosnia and Herzegovina
2 points	Slovenia
1 point	Cyprus

Points awarded by Belarus (Final)
Score	Country
12 points	Russia
10 points	Ukraine
8 points	Armenia
7 points	Finland
6 points	Lithuania
5 points	Sweden
4 points	Bosnia and Herzegovina
3 points	Romania
2 points	Greece
1 point	Norway
