= Belarus in the Eurovision Song Contest 2004 =

- Eurovision Song Contest 2004
- Participating broadcaster: Belarusian Television and Radio Company (BTRC)
- Country: Belarus
- Selection process: Evrovidenie 2004
- Selection date: 31 January 2004

Competing entry
- Song: "My Galileo"
- Artist: Aleksandra and Konstantin
- Songwriters: Aleksandra Kirsanova; Konstantin Drapezo; Aleksey Solomaha

Placement
- Semi-final result: Failed to qualify (19th)

Participation chronology

Belarus was represented at the Eurovision Song Contest 2004 with the song "My Galileo", composed by Alexandra Kirsanova and Konstantin Drapezo, with lyrics by Aleksey Solomaha, and performed by Aleksandra and Konstantin themselves. The Belarusian participating broadcaster, the Belarusian Television and Radio Company (BTRC), selected its entry through the national final Evrovidenie 2004. This was the first-ever entry from Belarus in the Eurovision Song Contest. The national final consisted of fifteen competing acts participating in a televised production where public voting selected the winner. "Moy galiley" performed by Aleksandra and Konstantin was selected as the winner with 2,311 votes. The song was later retitled as "My Galileo".

Belarus competed in the semi-final of the Eurovision Song Contest which took place on 12 May 2004. Performing during the show in position 2, "My Galileo" was not announced among the top 10 entries of the semi-final and therefore did not qualify to compete in the final. It was later revealed that Belarus placed nineteenth out of the 22 participating countries in the semi-final with 10 points.

== Background ==
On 21 February 2003, the Belarusian national broadcaster, the Belarusian Television and Radio Company (BTRC), confirmed its intentions to debut at the Eurovision Song Contest in its 2004 edition, after broadcasting both 2002 and 2003 editions. The broadcaster had previously planned to debut at the contest in 1993 and 2003; the latter year it was unable to take part after the European Broadcasting Union (EBU) decided that too many countries would be relegated from participation in 2003 if more countries took part. BTRC organised a national final in order to choose its debut entry for the 2004 contest.

== Before Eurovision ==
=== Evrovidenie 2004 ===
Evrovidenie 2004 was the national final format developed by BTRC to select the Belarusian entry for the Eurovision Song Contest 2004. Fifteen songs participated in the competition on 31 January 2004 and the winner was selected exclusively via a public vote. The show was broadcast on the First Channel and Radius FM.

==== Competing entries ====
Artists and composers were able to submit their applications and entries to the broadcaster between 22 October 2003 and 14 December 2003. Songs could be performed in any language, however, a translation of the lyrics to English and Belarusian/Russian were required, and at least part of the song had to be performed in English. At the closing of the deadline, 200 entries were received by the broadcaster, of which 59 were valid. A jury panel was tasked with selecting fifteen entries to proceed to the televised national final. The jury consisted of Vladimir Maksimkov (general producer of the First Channel), Yuriy Tsarev (head of the radio station "Radius FM"), Leonid Zakhlevny (composer, artistic director of the ensemble Byasyeda), Viktor Babarikin (chief conductor of the Presidential Orchestra of the Republic of Belarus), Eduard Zaritsky (composer), Vladimir Ivanov (composer), Vasily Rainchik (composer), Raisa Baravikova (editor-in-chief of the magazine "Maladost"), Alexander Tikhanovich (singer, director of music programs of the TV channel STV) and Yuriy Igrusha (general producer of the TV channel ONT). The selected finalists were announced on 31 December 2003. On 4 January 2004, BTRC announced that "Kali chakra, a i luz" performed by Jur'ya had been disqualified from the national final due to the band not signing the contract for participation. They were replaced with the song "People Say" performed by Adelina Petrosyan.

Artist	Song	Songwriter(s)
Adelina	"People Say"	Adelina Petrosyan
Alexander Soloduha	"Ne perezhivay" (Не переживай)	Oleg Zhukov, Oleg Eliseenkov
Aleksandra and Konstantin	"Moy galiley" (Мой галилей)	Aleksey Solomaha, Alexandra Kirsanova, Konstantin Drapezo
Alexandra Gaiduk	"Ya khranyu nadezhdu" (Я храню надежду)	Alexander Ivanov, Alexandra Gaiduk
Anna Bogdanova	"Prosto slova" (Просто слова)	Vladimir Kubishkin, Vitaliy Penzin
Corriana	"Svoboda" (Свобода)	Ekaterina Kachina, Leonid Shirin
Irina Dorofeeva	"Mne ne nuzhno bol'shey lyubvi" (Мне не нужно больше любви)	Pavel Baranovski, Evgeny Oleynik
Janet	"Lel'" (Лель)	Janet, Gennadiy Melnikov
Maxim Sapatkov	"Pust taet sneg" (Пусть тает снег)	Maxim Sapatkov
MiLR	"S prekrasnym svetom" (С прекрасным светом)	Dmitry Demidov, Dmitry Starovoitov
Nadezhda Tamelo	"Dozhdis'" (Дождись)	Leonid Shirin
Natalia Podolskaya	"Unstoppable"	Michael Jay, Raen Lobcher
Olga Molchanova	"I Try"	Dmitry Pavlov
Polina Smolova	"The Song of Love"	Sergey Borisevich, Vladimir Kurlovich
Yana	"Skazhi mne" (Скажи мне)	Tatiana Lipnitskaya

==== Final ====
The televised final took place on 31 January 2004 at the BTRC studios in Minsk, hosted by Larisa Gribaleva and Ales Kruglyakov. Prior to the competition, a draw for the running order took place on 22 January 2004. The performances of the competing entries were filmed on 23 January 2004, and the majority were performed in English despite their Russian titles. A public vote consisting of televoting and online voting selected the song "Moy galiley" performed by Aleksandra and Konstantin as the winner.

Final – 31 January 2004
R/O	Artist	Song	Public Vote			Place
R/O	Artist	Song	Televote	Online vote	Total	Place
1	Adelina	"People Say"	1,919	1	1,920	15
2	Aleksandra and Konstantin	"Moy galiley"	2,304	7	2,311	1
3	Irina Dorofeeva	"Mne ne nuzhno bol'shey lyubvi"	2,062	5	2,067	4
4	Maxim Sapatkov	"Pust taet sneg"	2,109	10	2,119	3
5	Nadezhda Tamelo	"Dozhdis'"	1,937	0	1,937	12
6	Olga Molchanova	"I Try"	1,926	6	1,932	13
7	Natalia Podolskaya	"Unstoppable"	2,163	50	2,213	2
8	Alexandra Gaiduk	"Ya khranyu nadezhdu"	2,037	2	2,039	5
9	Polina Smolova	"The Song of Love"	1,971	6	1,977	8
10	Corriana	"Svoboda"	1,998	10	2,008	6
11	Yana	"Skazhi mne"	1,950	4	1,954	10
12	Alexander Soloduha	"Ne perezhivay"	1,993	3	1,996	7
13	Anna Bogdanova	"Prosto slova"	1,961	6	1,967	9
14	MiLR	"S prekrasnym svetom"	1,924	3	1,927	14
15	Janet	"Lel'"	1,943	5	1,948	11

=== Controversy ===
The Belarusian national final caused controversy due to accusations of vote rigging. In addition to the collapse of the online voting platform due to high influx, figures provided by communications company Beltelecom revealed that Natalia Podolskaya was the actual winner with 14,506 votes while Aleksandra and Konstantin only placed third with 2,260 votes. Beltelecom later clarified that the official results from BTRC were based on votes received from another company as they did not directly provide the broadcaster with services for conducting the voting. Podolskaya's father stated that he would be filling a lawsuit to nullify the voting results.

== At Eurovision ==
It was announced that the competition's format would be expanded to include a semi-final in 2004. According to the rules, all nations with the exceptions of the host country, the "Big Four" (France, Germany, Spain and the United Kingdom) and the ten highest placed finishers in the 2003 contest are required to qualify from the semi-final on 12 May 2004 in order to compete for the final on 15 May 2004; the top ten countries from the semi-final progress to the final. On 23 March 2004, a special allocation draw was held which determined the running order for the semi-final and Belarus was set to perform in position 2, following the entry from Finland and before the entry from Switzerland. At the end of the semi-final, Belarus was not announced among the top 10 entries in the semi-final and therefore failed to qualify to compete in the final. It was later revealed that Belarus placed nineteenth in the semi-final, receiving a total of 10 points.

The semi-final and the final were broadcast in Belarus on the First Channel with commentary by Ales Kruglyakov. BTRC appointed Denis Kurian as its spokesperson to announce the results of the Belarusian televote during the final. Following the release of the televoting figures by the EBU after the conclusion of the competition, it was revealed that a total of 29,941 televotes were cast in Belarus during the two shows: 13,737 votes during the semi-final and 16,204 votes during the final.

=== Voting ===
Below is a breakdown of points awarded to Belarus and awarded by Belarus in the semi-final and grand final of the contest. The nation awarded its 12 points to Ukraine in the semi-final and to Russia in the final of the contest.

==== Points awarded to Belarus ====
Points awarded to Belarus (Semi-final)
Score	Country
12 points	
10 points	
8 points	
7 points	
6 points	
5 points	Ukraine
4 points	
3 points	
2 points	Estonia; Lithuania
1 point	Iceland

==== Points awarded by Belarus ====
Points awarded by Belarus (Semi-final)
Score	Country
12 points	Ukraine
10 points	Serbia and Montenegro
8 points	Greece
7 points	Croatia
6 points	Cyprus
5 points	Netherlands
4 points	Latvia
3 points	Israel
2 points	Lithuania
1 point	Malta

Points awarded by Belarus (Final)
Score	Country
12 points	Russia
10 points	Ukraine
8 points	Cyprus
7 points	Serbia and Montenegro
6 points	Greece
5 points	Croatia
4 points	Sweden
3 points	Turkey
2 points	Spain
1 point	United Kingdom
