= Ruslanas =

Ruslanas is a Lithuanized form of the Slavic masculine given name Ruslan. Notable people with the name include:

- Ruslanas Baranovas (born 1991), Lithuanian politician
- Ruslanas Vartanovas (born 1991), Lithuanian Greco-Roman wrestler and coach
