= Angelica Agurbash =

Belarusian singer and model (born 1970)

- Анжаліка Агурбаш
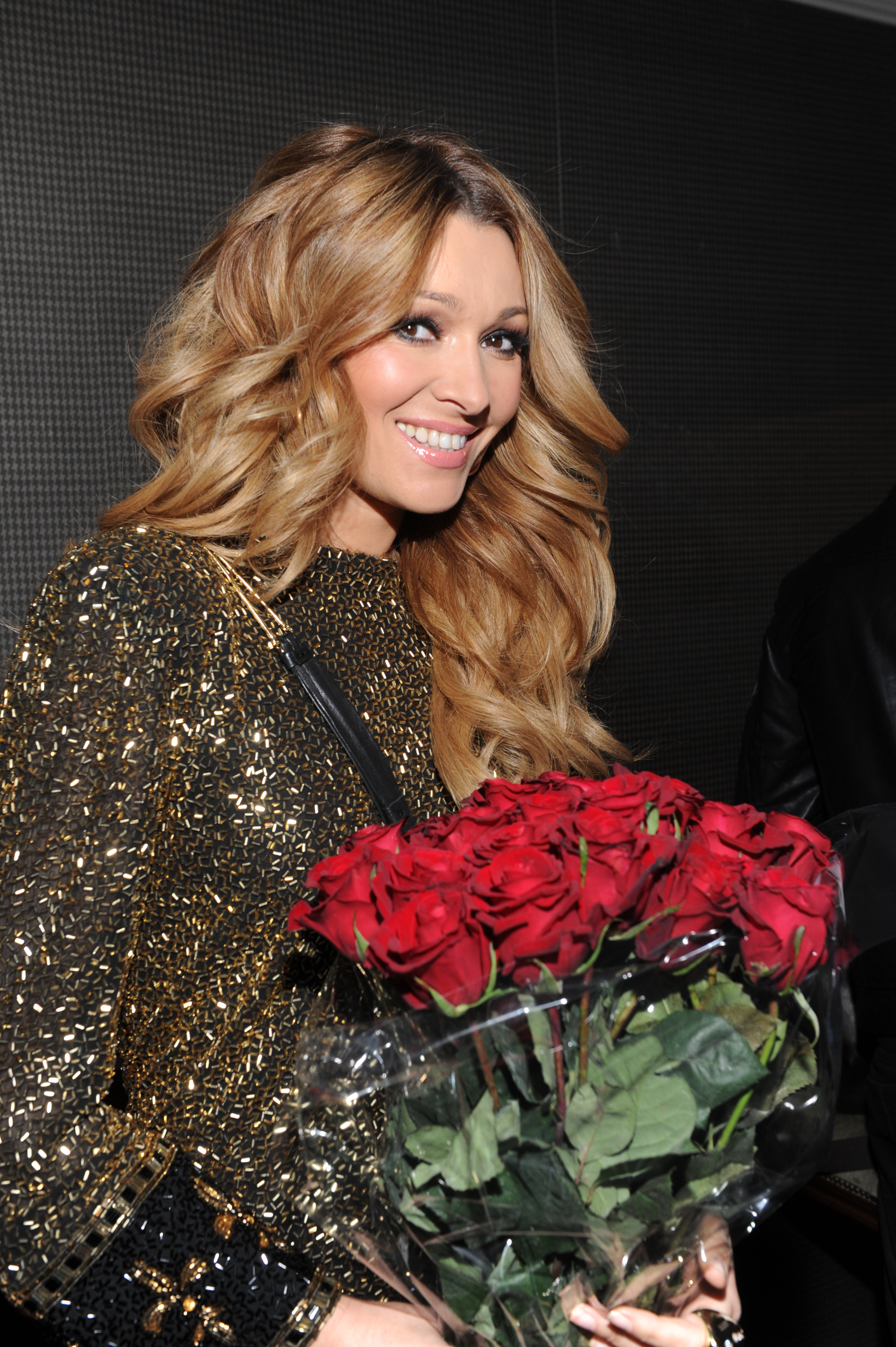
- Born: Angelica Anatolyevna Yalinskaya; 17 May 1970 (age 56); Minsk, Byelorussian SSR, Soviet Union
- Occupations: Singer, actress, model, tv presenter
- Years active: 1990–present
- Website: angelicaagurbash.su

Angelica Anatolyevna Yalinskaya (Russian: Анжелика Анатольевна Ялиньская, romanized: Anzhelika Anatol'yevna Yalin'skaya; Belarusian: Анжаліка Анатольеўна Ялінская, romanized: Anzhalika Anatoĺjeŭna Jalinskaja; born 17 May 1970), better known as Angelica Agurbash (Russian: Анжелика Агурбаш; Belarusian: Анжаліка Агурбаш), is a Belarusian singer and former model best known internationally for representing Belarus at the Eurovision Song Contest 2005.

== Biography ==
Agurbash was born the city of Minsk, Belarus, during the period the city was within the Byelorussian Soviet Socialist Republic of the Soviet Union. In 1988, she won the first Miss Belarus title when she was a student of the Belarusian Academy of Arts. Between 1990 and 1995, she was in the band Verasy. In 1991, Angelica earned her second title "Miss Photo USSR" becoming the most photographed model in Belarus.

After Angelica left Verasy, she has had numerous hit singles as well as releasing three albums – "Paper Moon", "Night Without a Dream" and "For You". In 2002, she presented her brand-new album "The Farewell Kiss of Lika Yalinskaya" the same year. Agurbash was the Belarusian Eurovision Song Contest entrant in 2005. Her original song, Boys and Girls, a rock ballad themed after the Beslan school hostage crisis, was chosen by a jury after a pre-selection vote by Belarusian viewers. However, due to the song's poor reception across Europe, the Belarusian state broadcaster decided in a highly unusual move to allow Angelica to sing a different song in Kyiv.

She ordered songs from two composers with successful Eurovision records: the Israeli author of 1998 winner Diva Svika Pick, and the author of Antique's hit Die For You Nikos Terzis. After long hesitation, Agurbash picked the Greek disco anthem Love Me Tonight. The song change succeeded in producing hype around the Belarusian entry, to which added also a transformer dress, inspired by Marie N's victory in 2002. She entered the show amongst the pre show favourites. However, in the contest she did not fare as well as expected, failing to make it past the semi-finals. "Love Me Tonight" ended 13th out of 25.

== Public position ==
Angelica Agurbash supports the opposition to the political regime in Belarus. In connection with her participation in a solidarity event, she was briefly detained in Russia.

In June 2021, the authorities of the Republic of Belarus opened a criminal case against her on charges of inciting discord and insulting Alexander Lukashenko. She was charged under Part 3 of Article 130 of the Criminal Code (incitement of enmity or discord), which carries a sentence of up to 12 years' imprisonment, and Part 2 of Article 368 of the Criminal Code (insulting the president), which carries a sentence of up to three years. According to the Belarusian Prosecutor General's Office, the singer was arrested in absentia. The Belarusian authorities submitted a request to the Prosecutor General's Office of the Russian Federation for her extradition to Belarus to serve her sentence there.

== Discography ==
- "Love Me Tonight" (12 April 2024)
- "You do not know me that way" (25 September 2012)
- "Grand Collection" (20 April 2010)
- "Love!Love?Love..." (26 February 2009)
- "I will live for you" (9.02.2007)
- "Belarussian girl" (15 July 2005)
- "Rules of love" (18 May 2005)
- "Best songs" (1 January 2002)
- "Last kiss" (1 January 2001)
- "For you" (1 January 1999)
- "Night without a dream" (1 January 1997)
- "Paper moon" (1 January 1995)

Awards and achievements
Preceded by Aleksandra and Konstantin with "My Galileo"	Belarus in the Eurovision Song Contest; 2005	Succeeded by Polina Smolova with "Mum"
