= Rusian =

Rusian may refer to:

- Old East Slavic, a language which some scholars refer to as Rusian
- Ruthenian language, also known as Rusian
- Rusian, a fictional character in And You Thought There Is Never a Girl Online?
- A spelling mistake of Russian

== See also ==
- Rus' people
- Ruslan (disambiguation)
- Russian (disambiguation)
- Rusyn (disambiguation)
