= Belarus in the Eurovision Song Contest =

- Eurovision Song Contest
- Former participating broadcaster: Belarusian Television and Radio Company (BTRC; 2004–2021)

Participation summary
- Appearances: 16 (6 finals)
- First appearance: 2004
- Last appearance: 2019
- Highest placement: 6th: 2007
- Participation history: 2004; 2005; 2006; 2007; 2008; 2009; 2010; 2011; 2012; 2013; 2014; 2015; 2016; 2017; 2018; 2019; ~~2020~~; ~~2021~~; 2022 – 2026
- Belarus's page at Eurovision.com
- For the most recent participation see Belarus in the Eurovision Song Contest 2019

Belarus was represented at the Eurovision Song Contest 16 times, making its debut in 2004 and having its last appearance in 2019. The Belarusian participating broadcaster in the contest was the Belarusian Television and Radio Company (BTRC). Since 1 July 2021, Belarus has been unable to participate in the contest following the suspension of BTRC's membership in the European Broadcasting Union (EBU). The country's first appearance in a final was in 2007, with the song "Work Your Magic" performed by Dmitry Koldun, where it placed sixth; this remains Belarus' only top ten placement. Belarus also qualified for the final in 2010, 2013, 2014, 2017, and 2019. More recently, the nation had planned to take part in the cancelled 2020 contest and was disqualified from taking part in the 2021 contest.

== Participation ==
The Belarusian Television and Radio Company (BTRC) was a full member of the European Broadcasting Union (EBU) since 1 January 1993, thus eligible to participate in the Eurovision Song Contest since then. It participated in the contest representing Belarus since its 49th edition in 2004.

Prior to 2004, the country had considered debuting in 1993 and 2003, but the planned entries failed to materialize.

== History ==
Belarus entered the contest in 2004, the same year that semi-finals began to be used to determine who would compete in the final. Belarus has qualified for the final six times: in 2007 with "Work Your Magic", in 2010 with "Butterflies", in 2013 with "Solayoh", in 2014 with "Cheesecake", in 2017 with "Story of My Life", and in 2019 with "Like It".

Alexander Rybak, the winner of the 2009 contest representing Norway, expressed an interest in composing an entry for his birth country Belarus. Rybak's song "Accent", performed by Milki, competed in the Belarusian national final for the 2015 contest, placing fourth.

Belarus originally planned to participate in the 2021 contest, and were set to perform in the first half of the first semi-final. On 9 March 2021, Galasy ZMesta was announced as the chosen entrant with the song "Ya nauchu tebya (I'll Teach You)". However, the entry was disqualified on 11 March, as it was decided by the EBU that the song was in violation of the contest's rules. Belarusian broadcaster BTRC was ordered to submit either a new version of the song or an entirely new song that is compliant with the rules, or face disqualification. On 26 March, BTRC submitted the song "Pesnya pro zaytsev (Song about hares)" (Russian: Песня про зайцев), also sung by Galasy ZMesta, as Belarus' new entry, however that song was also disqualified, again for the same reasons as their previous attempt, and Belarus was subsequently disqualified from the 2021 contest altogether.

On 28 May 2021, six days after the 2021 final, the EBU voted to suspend BTRC's membership. BTRC was given two weeks to respond before the suspension came into effect on 11 June, but there was no public response. The broadcaster was expelled from the EBU on 1 July, therefore losing the rights to broadcast and participate in the contest. It was subsequently stated that the expulsion would last for three years, however, in late April 2024 (one month before the expiration), the EBU declared that there was "no reason to change [its] position at the current time", thus making the suspension indefinite.

== Participation overview ==
Table key
◇	Entry selected but did not compete

Year	Artist	Song	Language	Final	Points	Semi	Points
2004	Aleksandra and Konstantin	"My Galileo"	English	Failed to qualify		19	10
2005	Angelica Agurbash	"Love Me Tonight"	English	Failed to qualify		13	67
2006	Polina Smolova	"Mum"	English	Failed to qualify		22	10
2007	Koldun	"Work Your Magic"	English	6	145	4	176
2008	Ruslan Alehno	"Hasta la vista"	English	Failed to qualify		17	27
2009	Petr Elfimov	"Eyes That Never Lie"	English	Failed to qualify		13	25
2010	3+2 feat. Robert Wells	"Butterflies"	English	24	18	9	59
2011	Anastasia Vinnikova	"I Love Belarus"	English	Failed to qualify		14	45
2012	Litesound	"We Are the Heroes"	English	Failed to qualify		16	35
2013	Alyona Lanskaya	"Solayoh"	English	16	48	7	64
2014	Teo	"Cheesecake"	English	16	43	5	87
2015	Uzari and Maimuna	"Time"	English	Failed to qualify		12	39
2016	Ivan	"Help You Fly"	English	Failed to qualify		12	84
2017	Naviband	"Story of My Life"	Belarusian	17	83	9	110
2018	Alekseev	"Forever"	English	Failed to qualify		16	65
2019	Zena	"Like It"	English	24	31	10	122
2020	VAL ◇	"Da vidna" (Да відна) ◇	Belarusian ◇	Contest cancelled (Note: The 2020 contest was cancelled due to the COVID-19 pandemic.)			
2021	Galasy ZMesta ◇	Entries disqualified ◇ (Note: Originally "Ya nauchu tebya (I'll Teach You)" (Я научу тебя) was chosen as the Belarusian entry for 2021, however this was disqualified by the EBU due to the political nature of the lyrics relating to the 2020–2021 Belarusian protests. Subsequently a new entry, "Pesnya pro zaytsev (Song About Hares)" (Песня про зайцев), was chosen, however this was also barred from competing, which led to the exclusion of Belarus from the 2021 contest.)	Russian ◇	Disqualified			

== Related involvement ==
=== Heads of delegation ===
Each participating broadcaster in the Eurovision Song Contest assigns a head of delegation as the EBU's contact person and the leader of their delegation at the event. The delegation, whose size can greatly vary, includes a head of press, the performers, songwriters, composers, and backing vocalists, among others.

Year	Head of delegation	Ref.
2009–2011	Alexander Martynenko	
2012–2016	Marat Markov	
2017–2019	Olga Salamakha	

=== Commentators and spokespersons ===
Year	Channel	Commentator	Spokesperson	Ref.
2002	Unknown	Unknown	Did not participate	
2003	Belarus-1	Ales Kruglyakov, Tatyana Yakusheva	Did not participate	
2004	Unknown	Ales Kruglyakov and Denis Dudinsky	Denis Kurian	
2005	Belarus-1	Ales Kruglyakov	Elena Ponomareva	
2006	Unknown	Denis Dudinskiy	Corrianna	
2007	Unknown	Denis Kurian, Alexander Tikhanovich	Juliana	
2008	Belarus-1, Belarus-TV	Denis Kurian	Olga Barabanschikova	
2009	Belarus-1	Denis Kurian, Alexander Tikhanovich	Ekaterina Litvinova	
2010	Belarus-1	Denis Kurian	Aleksei Grishin	
2011	Belarus-1	Denis Kurian	Leila Ismailava	
2012	Belarus-1	Denis Kurian	Dmitry Koldun	
2013	Belarus-1, Belarus 24	Evgeny Perlin	Darya Domracheva	
2014	Belarus-1, Belarus 24	Evgeny Perlin	Alyona Lanskaya	
2015	Belarus-1, Belarus 24	Evgeny Perlin	Teo	
2016	Belarus-1, Belarus 24	Evgeny Perlin	Uzari	
2017	Belarus-1, Belarus 24	Evgeny Perlin	Alyona Lanskaya	
2018	Belarus-1, Belarus 24	Evgeny Perlin	Naviband	
2019	Belarus-1, Belarus 24	Evgeny Perlin	Maria Vasilevich	
~~2020~~	~~Belarus-1, Belarus 24~~	~~Evgeny Perlin~~	Not announced before cancellation	
2021–2026	Suspended from broadcasting		Did not participate	

==== Other shows ====
Show	Commentator	Channel	Ref.
Eurovision: Europe Shine a Light	Evgeny Perlin	Belarus 1, Belarus 24	

== Photo gallery ==
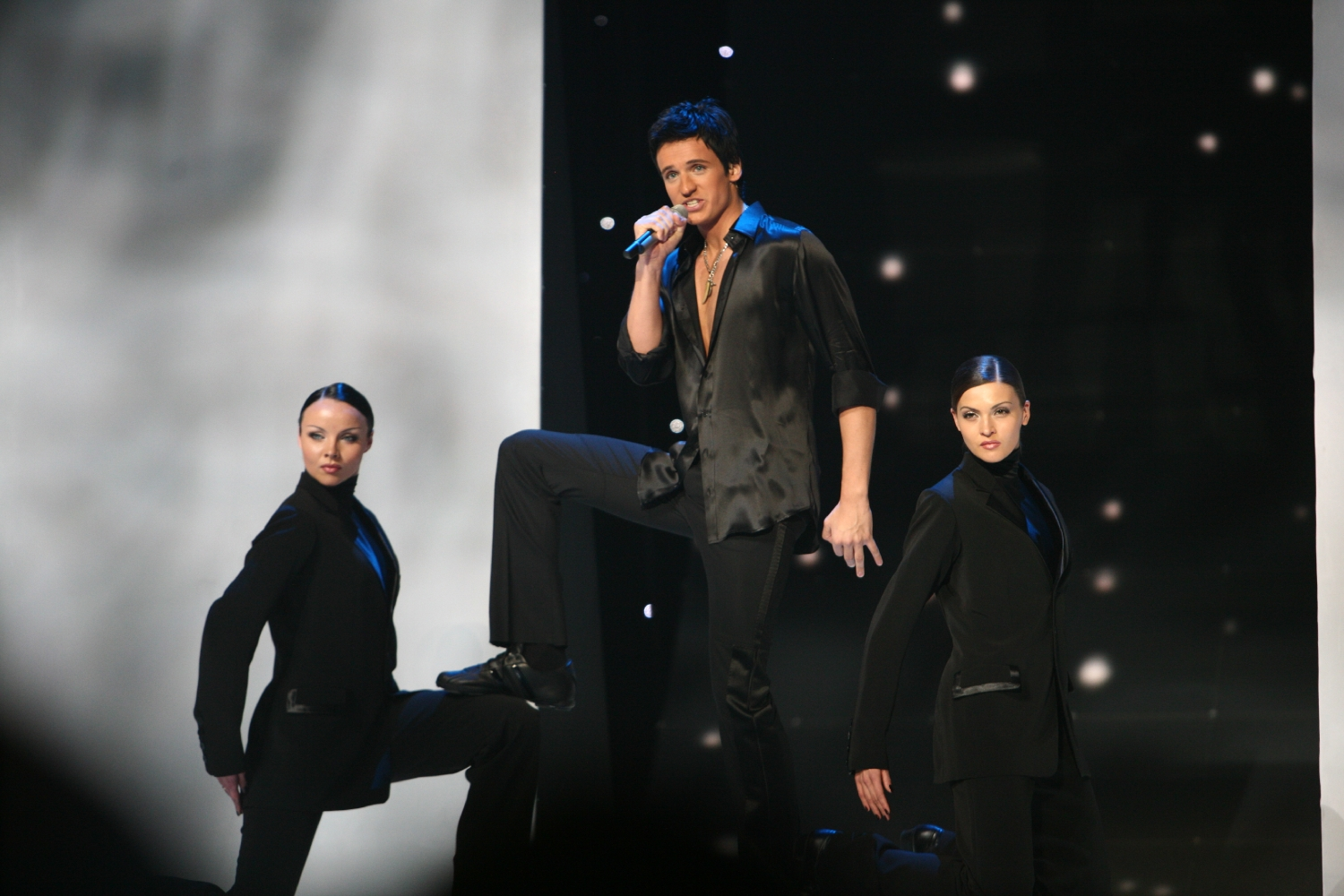
Dmitry Koldun in Helsinki (2007)

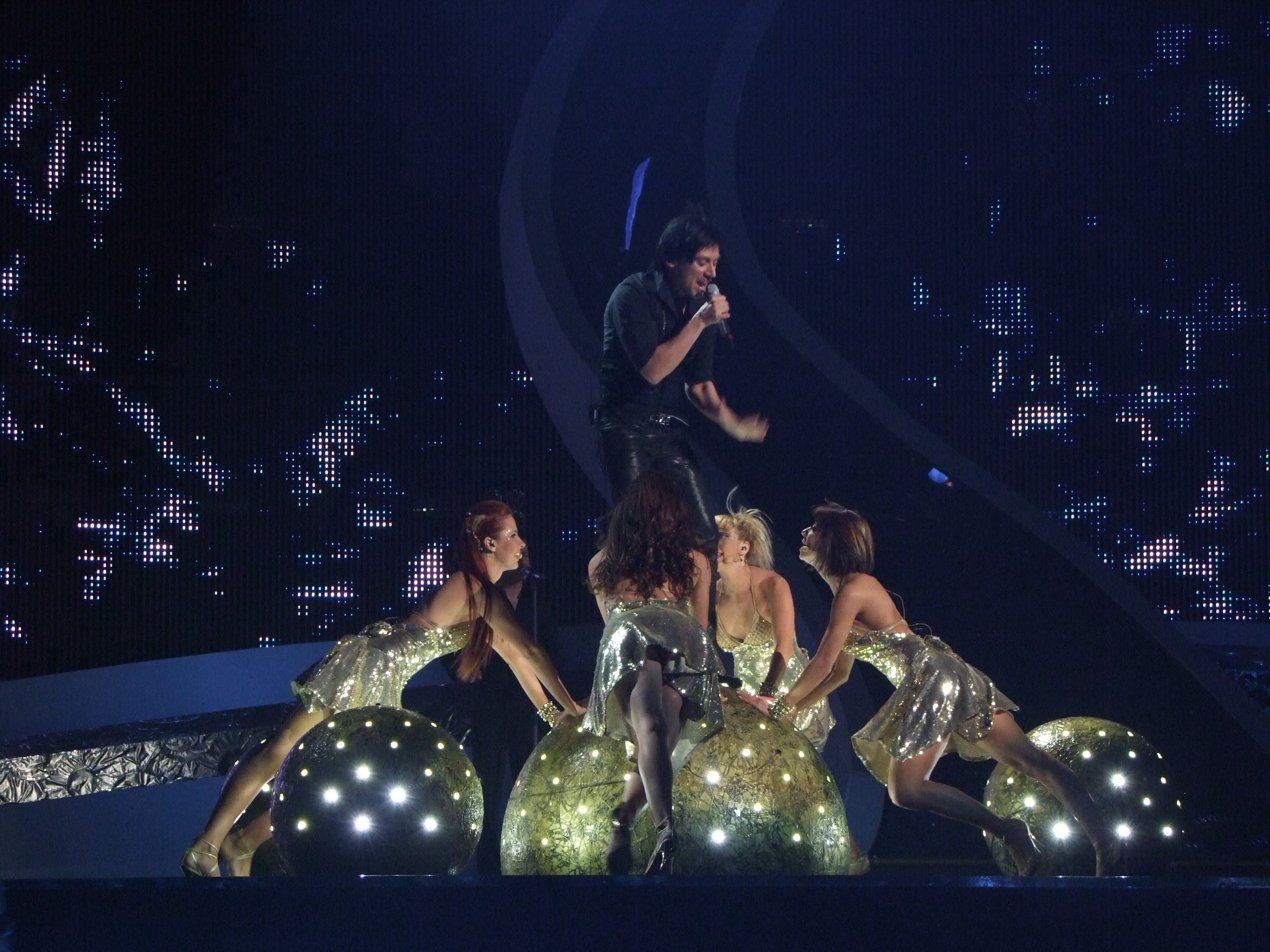
Ruslan Alekhno in Belgrade (2008)

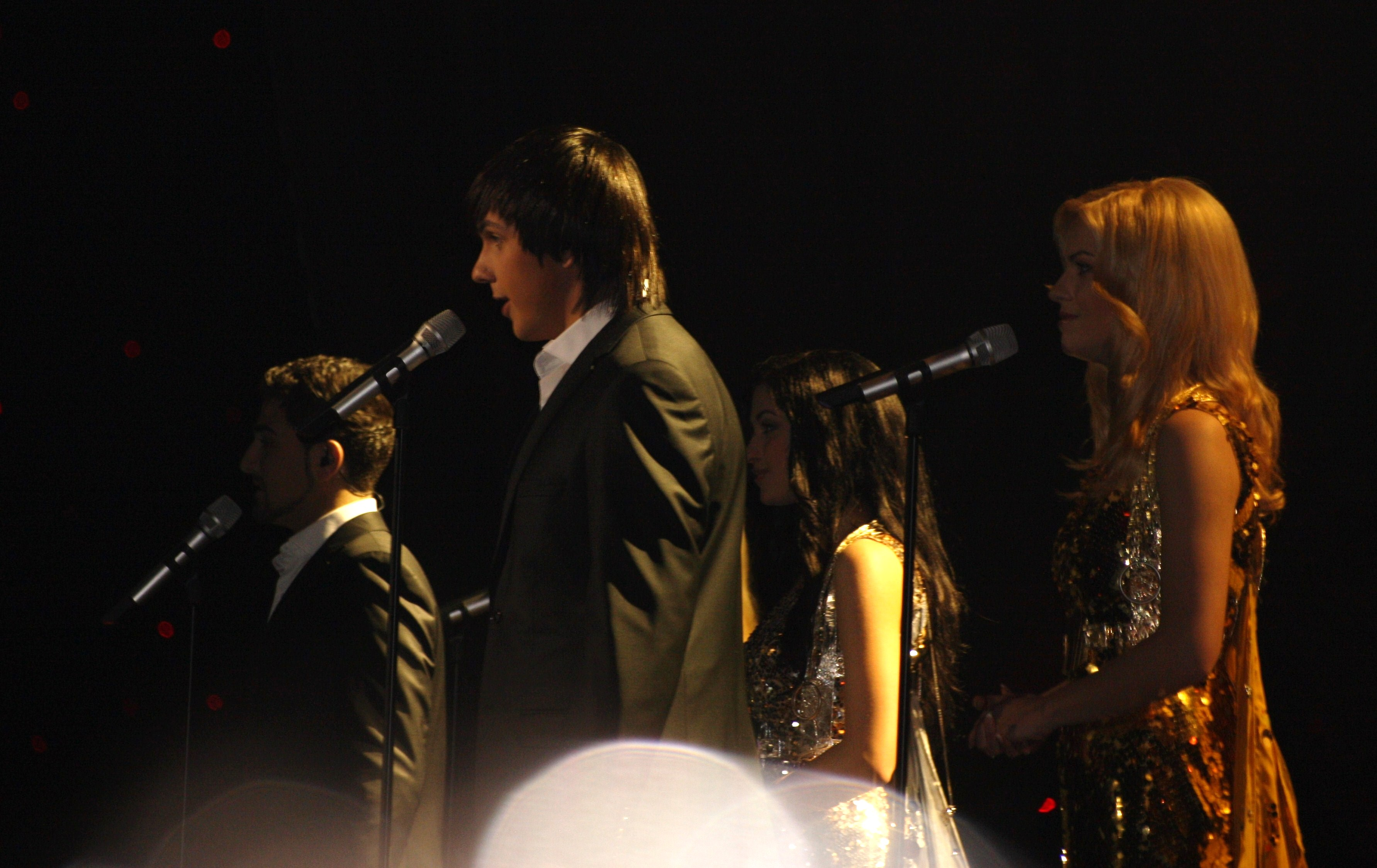
3+2 in Oslo (2010)

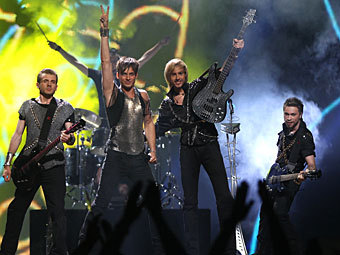
Litesound in Baku (2012)

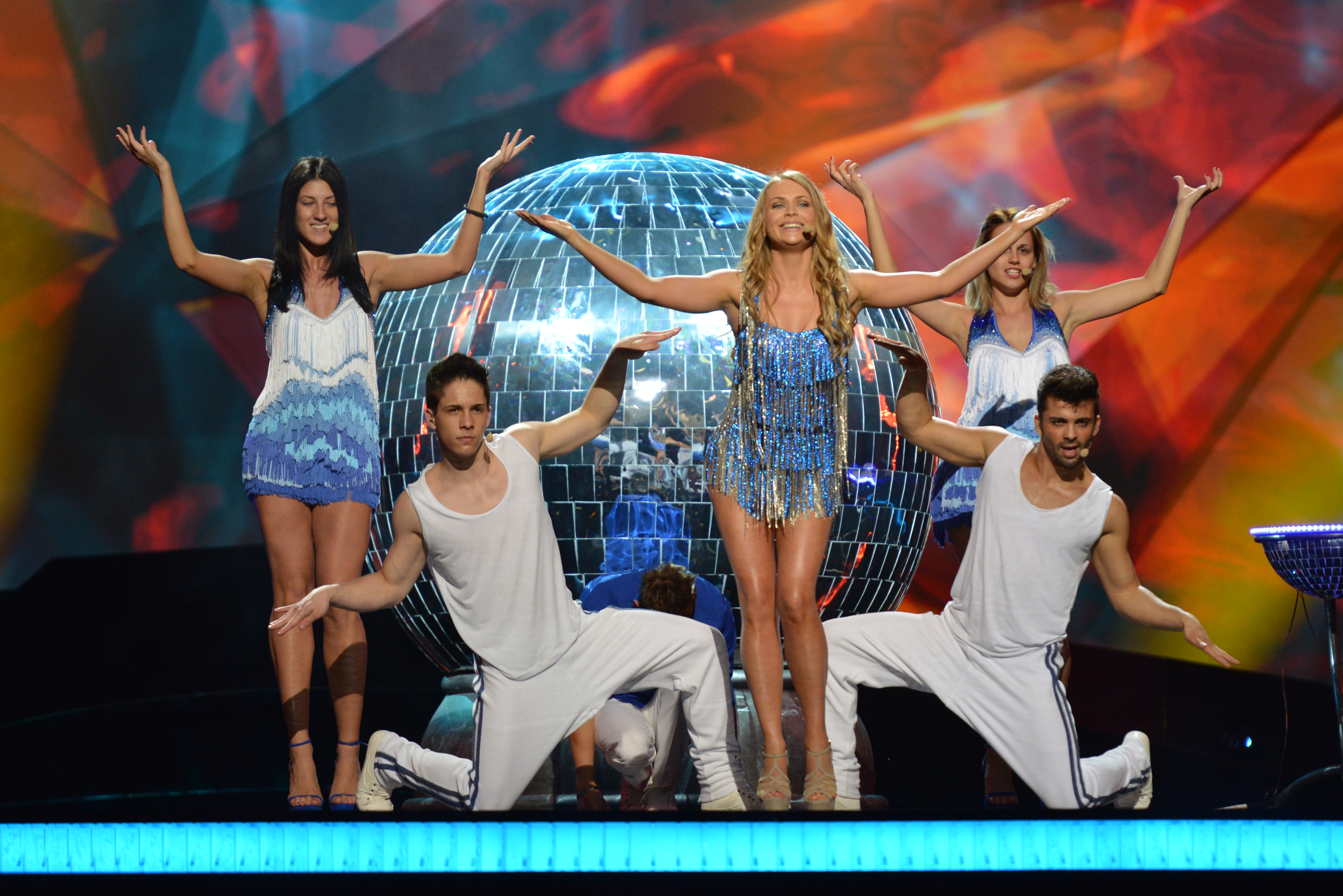
Alyona Lanskaya in Malmö (2013)

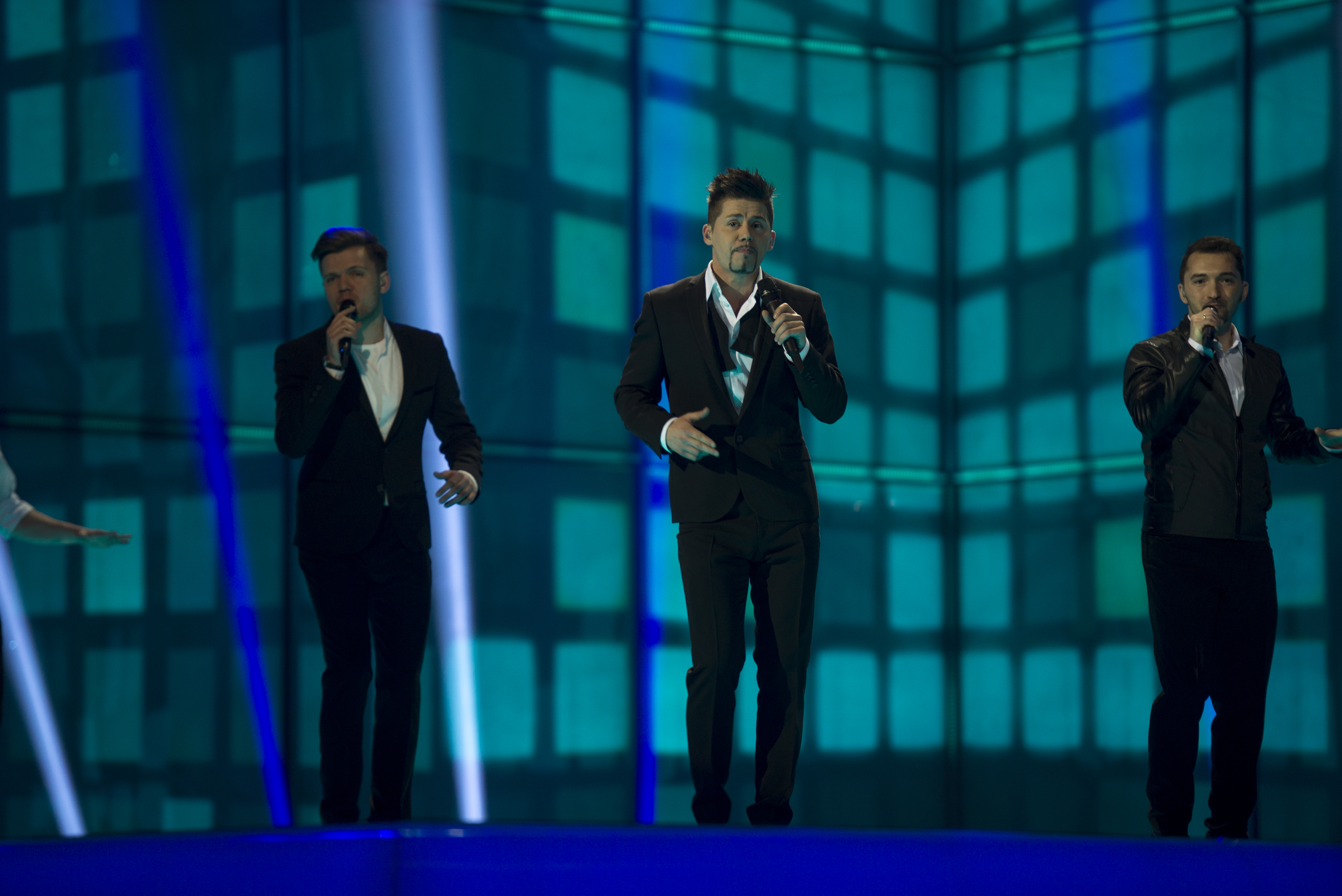
Teo in Copenhagen (2014)

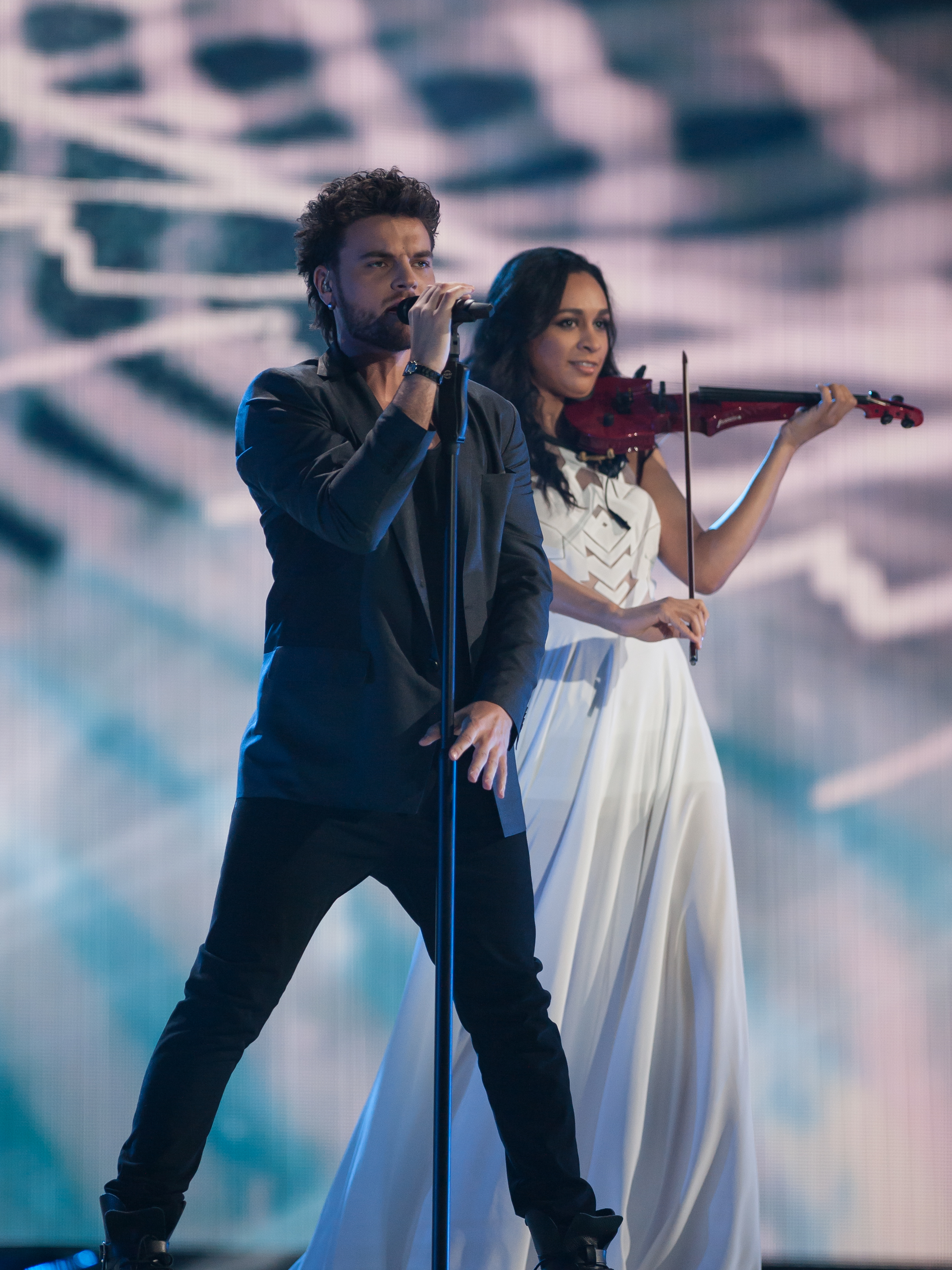
Uzari and Maimuna in Vienna (2015)

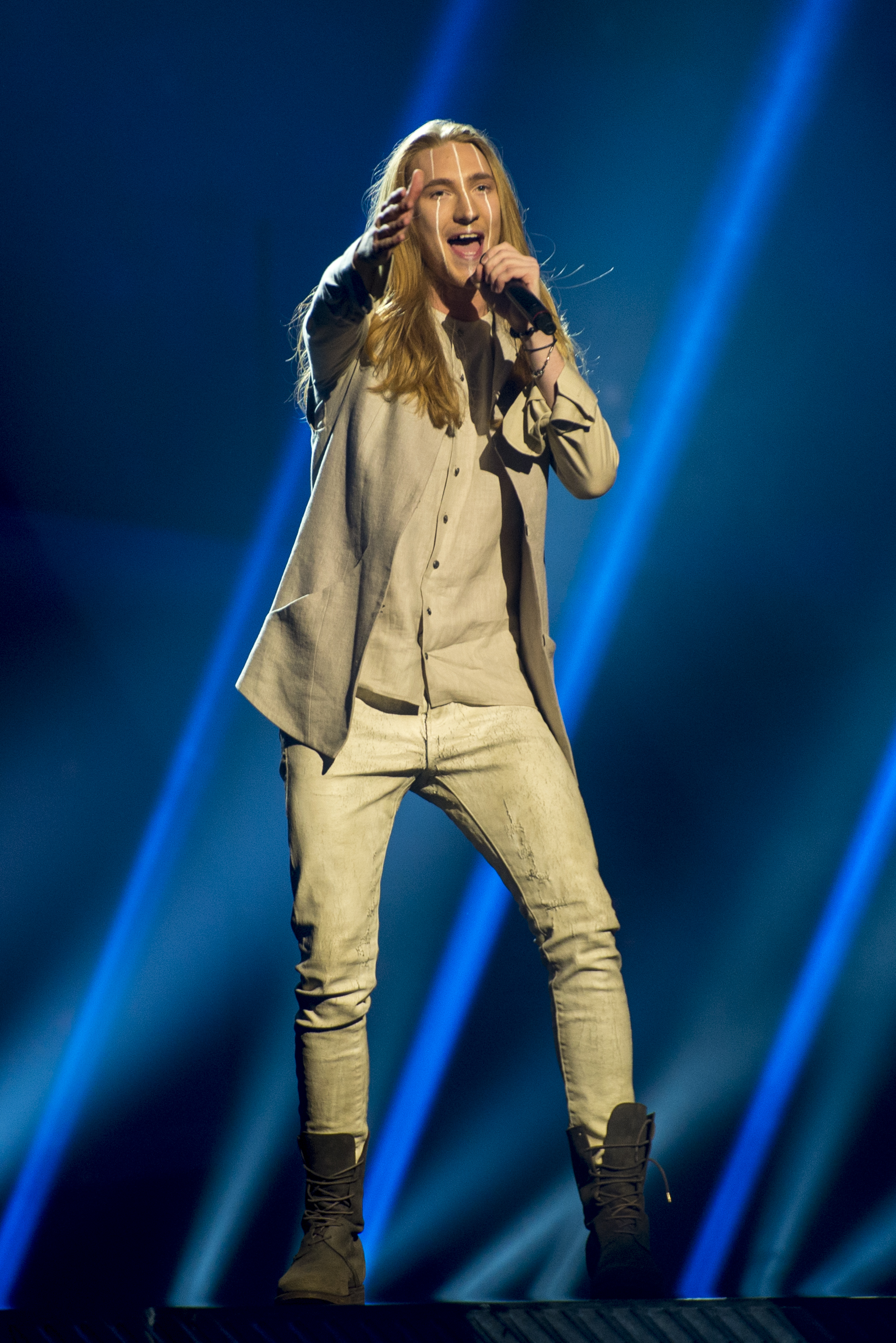
Ivan in Stockholm (2016)

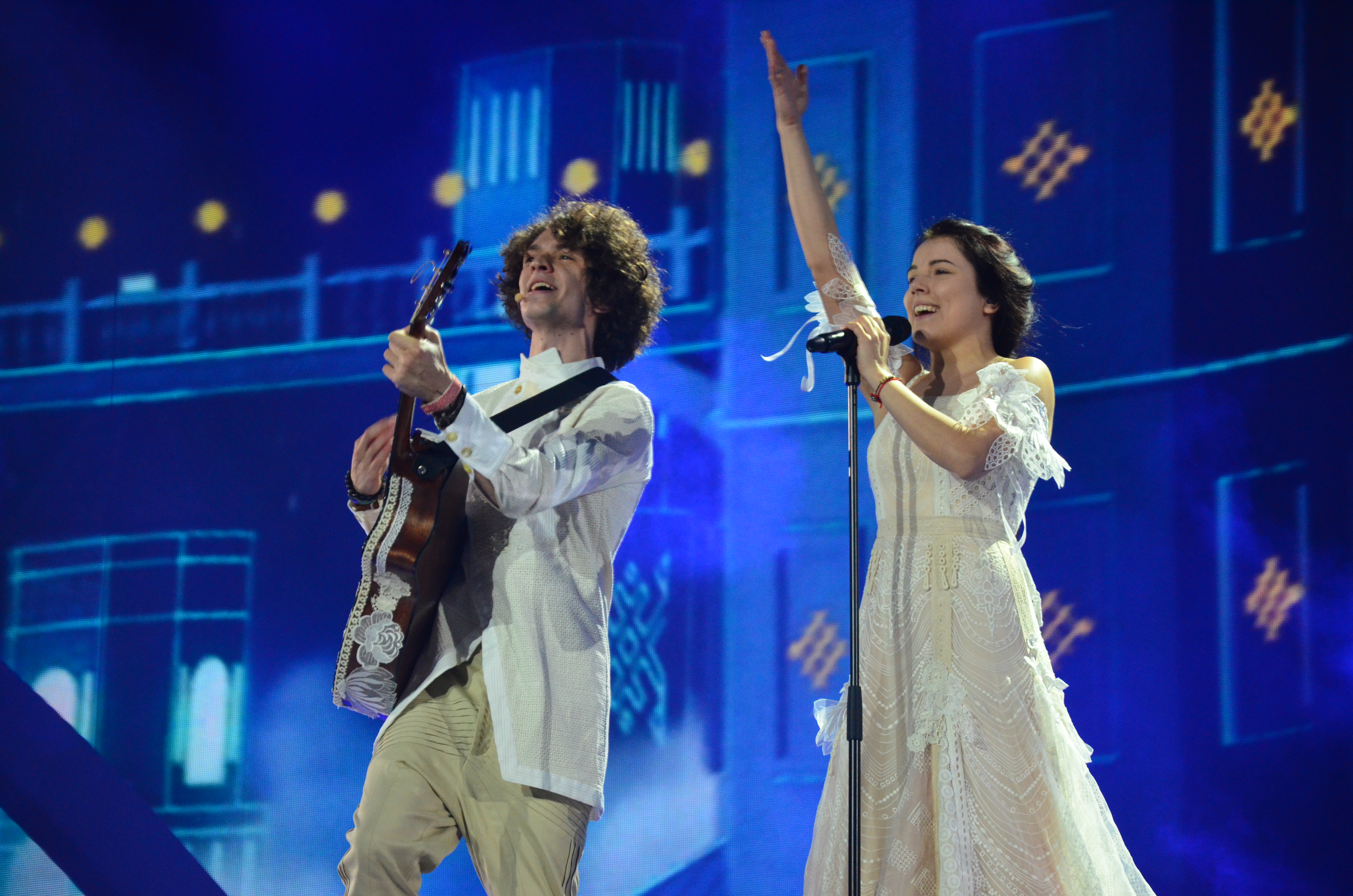
Naviband in Kyiv (2017)

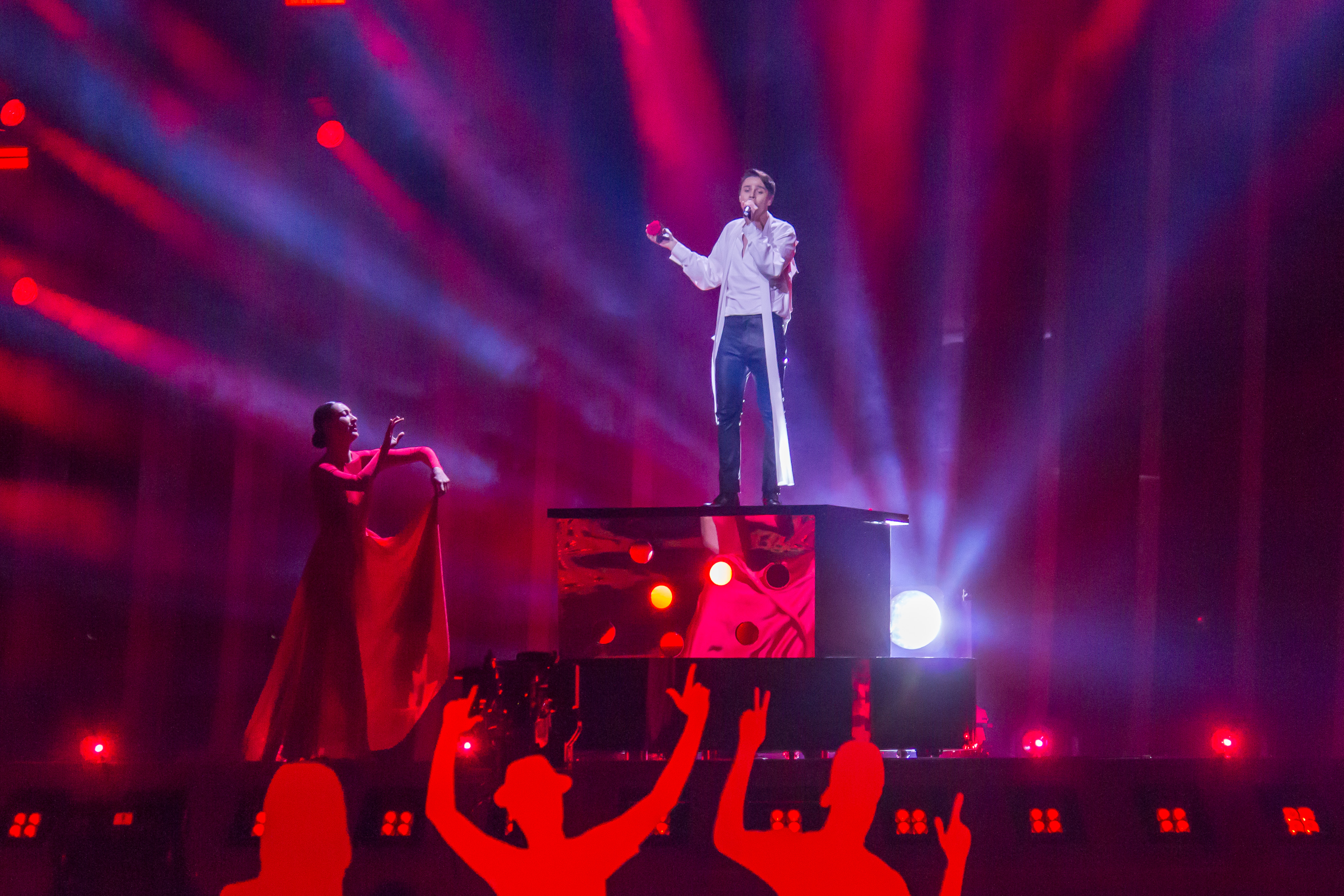
Alekseev in Lisbon (2018)

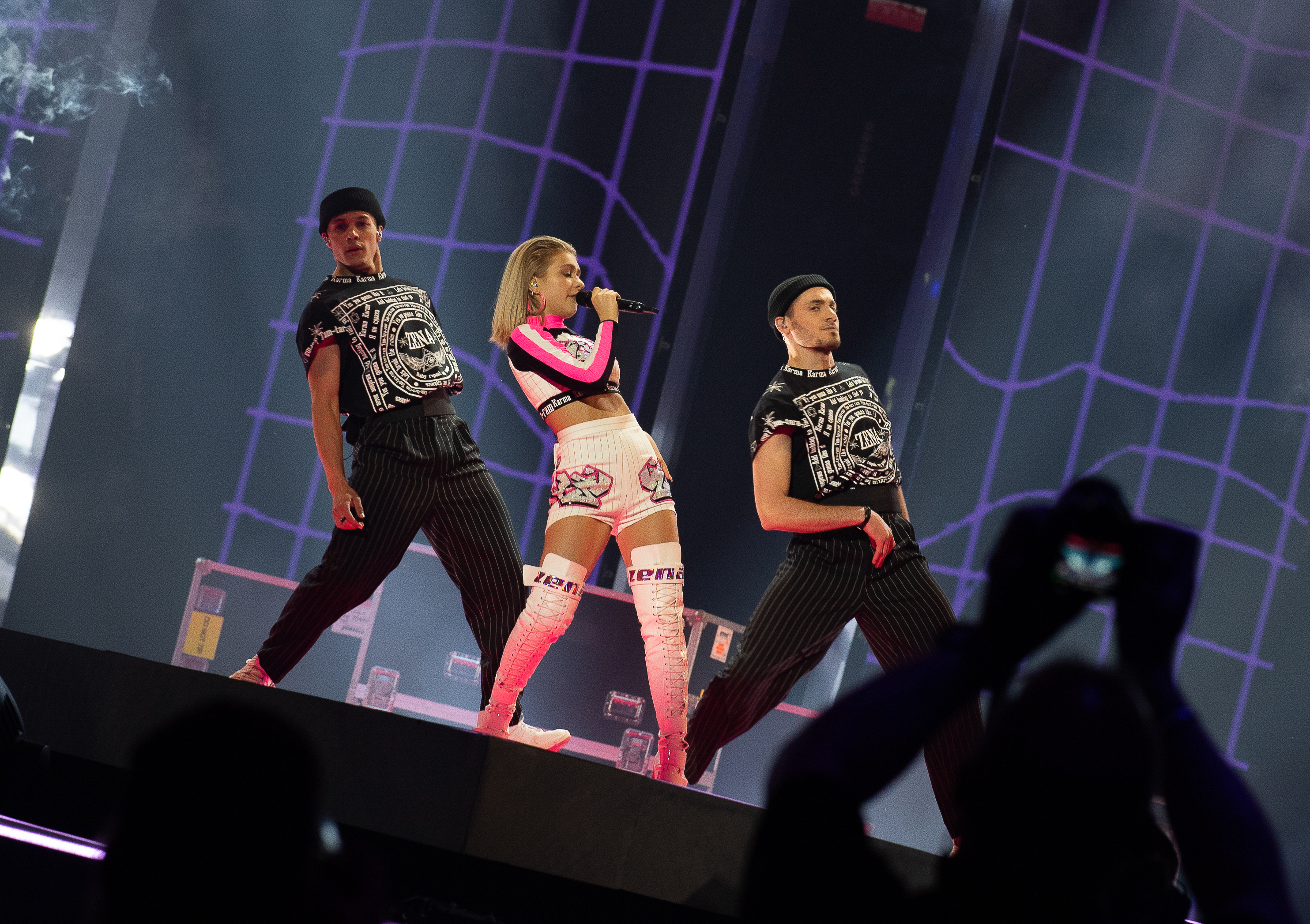
Zena in Tel Aviv (2019)

== See also ==
- Belarus in the Junior Eurovision Song Contest – Junior version of the Eurovision Song Contest.
- Belarus in the Intervision Song Contest – A competition formerly organized by the International Radio and Television Organisation (OIRT) from 1965 to 1980, and revived in 2025.
