= Ruslana (given name) =

Ruslana is a Slavic female given name. Ruslana is a feminine form of the Turkic name Ruslan. Notable people with the name include:

- Ruslana (born 1973), Ukrainian singer and winner of the Eurovision Song Contest 2004
- Ruslana Korshunova (1987–2008), Russian model
- Ruslana Kyrychenko (born 1975), Ukrainian basketball player
- Ruslana Panchyshyna (born 2005), Ukrainian-Spanish singer
- Ruslana Pysanka (1965–2022), Ukrainian actress and cinematographer
- Ruslana Taran (born 1970), Ukrainian sailor
- Ruslana Tsykhotska (born 1986), Ukrainian athlete
