= Yeruslan (disambiguation) =

Yeruslan is a river in Russia.

Yeruslan or Eruslan (Russian: Еруслан) may also refer to:

- Yeruslan Lazarevich, Russian folk hero
- Yeruslan, Saratov Oblast, village in Russia
- Yeruslan (station), station on the Privolzhskaya Railway, Russia

== See also ==
- Ruslan (disambiguation)
