= Ruslan Alekhno =

Russian and Belarusian singer

- Руслан Аляхно
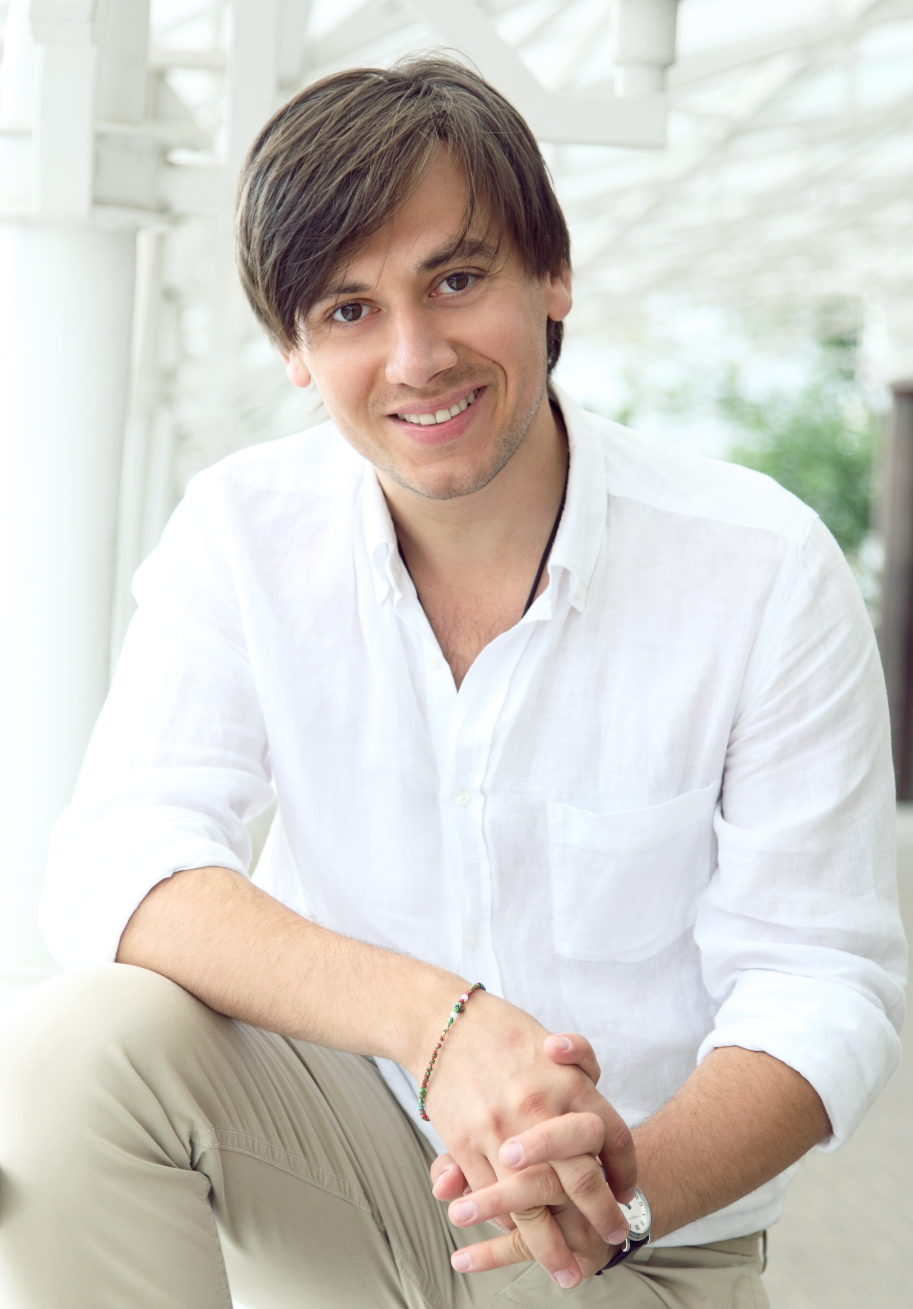
- Alehno in 2012
- Born: October 14, 1981 (age 44); Bobruysk, Byelorussian SSR, USSR
- Occupations: singer, performer
- Years active: 2001–present
- Musical career
- Genres: Pop, Pop rock, Russian romance
- Website: www.alehno.ru

Ruslan Fyodorovich Alekhno (Russian: Русла́н Фёдорович Алехно́, Ruslan Feodorovich Alekhno, Belarusian: Русла́н Фёдаравіч Аляхно́, Ruslan Feodaravich Alyakhno; born October 14, 1981) is a Belarusian-Russian singer who rose to popularity after winning Narodniy Artist – 2, the Russian version of Pop Idol. Alekhno received the Medal of Francysk Skaryna in 2019.

== Early life ==
Ruslan Alekhno was born on October 14, 1981, in Babruysk, Byelorussian SSR, USSR now Belarus. Alekhno grew up in a military family, his father was a military officer. Although Alekhno only has one younger brother, he grew up alongside a total of 23 cousins. As a child, Alekhno was interested in music and took classes to play bayan and trumpet. When he was 16, Alekhno wrote his first musical composition. The role of the only spectator and critic as well was given to his mother.

Alekhno graduated the Babruysk State Auto-Transport College with a degree in transport planning. Subsequently, he was drafted into the Belarusian army. During his service, he was invited to become part of the Belarusian Armed Forces Academic Song and Dance Ensemble after one of the solists had heard his singing voice at an evening activity. Alekhno stayed into the Ensemble for four years, before decided to leave the army to pursue a solo career in music.

== Career ==
=== Early career ===
In 2001, Ruslan Alekhno was the winner of the Belarusian TV project Hit-Moment, and in 2003 he was the winner in "Clear Voice" nomination at the "Crossroads of Europe Festival" in Belarus and was also the laureate of "Molodechno-2003" vocal contest in Belarus. In 2004, he also won the second prize in the International Malvy Festival in Poland. In 2005, together with Aleksey Goman, winner of Narodniy Artist – 1, he was the prize winner of Festival of Patriotic songs with "This is my Homeland", devoted to Victory anniversary.

Ruslan Alekhno won the Russian TV project Narodniy Artist – 2 (in Russian Народный артист – 2, translated as People's Artist – 2, the Russian version of Pop Idol). Upon his victory, he released his first studio album Rano ili pozdno (Sooner or later) in 2005.

=== Eurovision 2008 ===
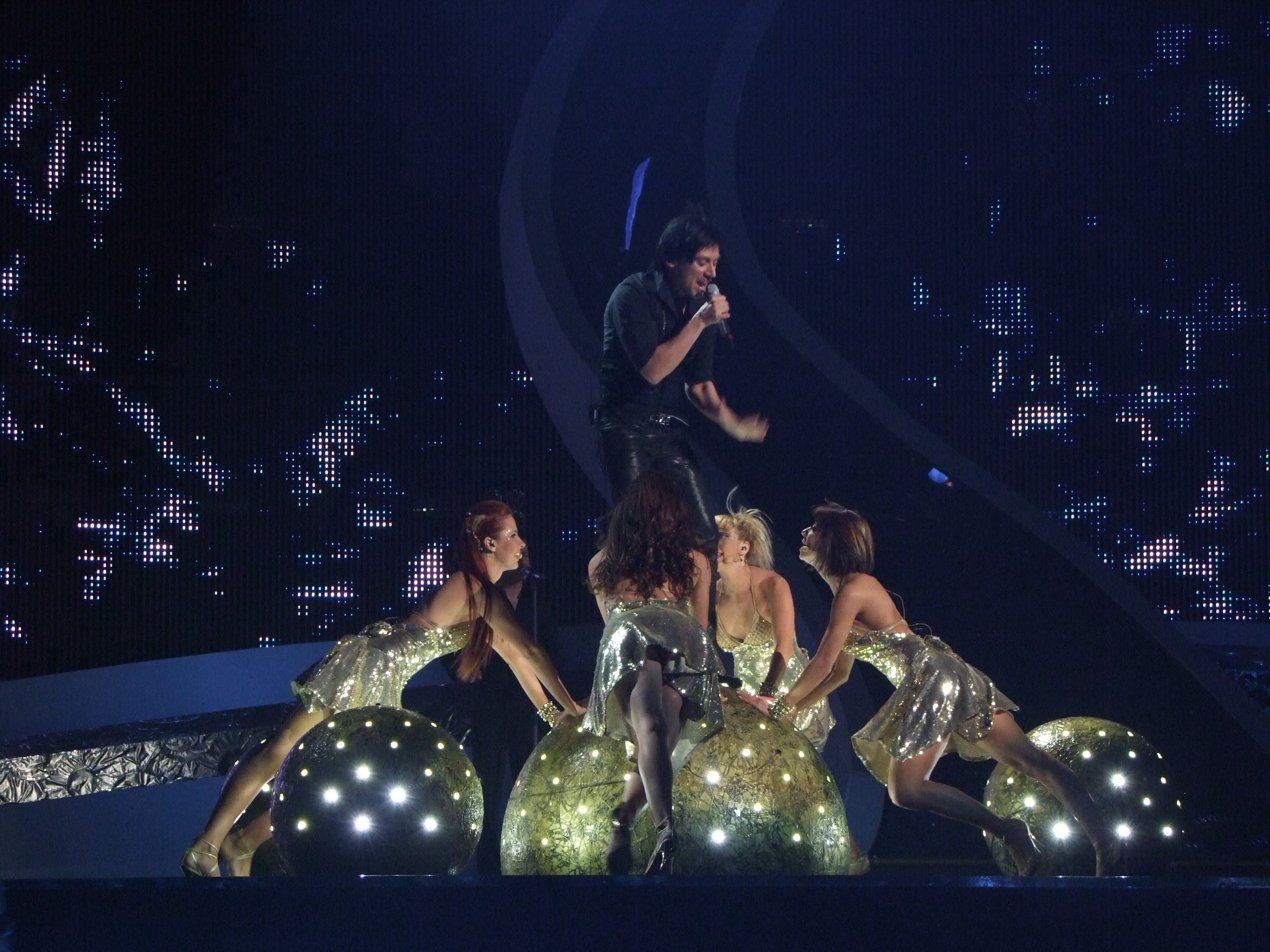
Ruslan Alekhno at Belgrade (2008)

In 2008, Ruslan Alekhno became the winner of National Television Musical project EuroFest, the Belarusian annual competition to decide the Belarusian entry in the Eurovision Song Contest.

Emerging as the victor, he went on to represent Belarus in the Eurovision Song Contest 2008. Alekhno sang in the second semi-final elimination round on May 22, 2008, singing "Hasta la Vista", but failed to qualify to the final.

=== 2008-present ===
In 2012, Alekhno began a new creative phase, recording new songs and working on a new show. His new song "Ne zabyt'" was in rotation on radio stations, and a new video was released, as well as his next single "My ostanemsya".

In May 2013, he released album of war songs Nasledie, which included the famous Russian songs of the Great Patriotic War. According to Ruslan, his new album is a tribute to all veterans of World War II. Ruslan dedicates it to all grandparents, who fought against fascism.

On May 26, 2013, International Academy of Public Recognition presented Ruslan Alekhno with the Award "For contribution to the development of Russian culture."

In 2014, Alekhno released the single "Serdtse iz stekla" featuring Russian singer Valeriya. Its music video was released in Spring 2014.

In 2015, Alekhno won the TV show "Odin v odin!", the Russian version of "Your Face Sounds Familiar".

Alekhno performed in a concert for Russian troops in Syria at new year 2016.

In 2019, he participated in The Voice of Russia. During the Blind Auditions, he sang Jaak Joala's "Podberu muzyku" and did not manage to let any of the coaches turn. One of the coaches, Konstantin Meladze, called Alekhno a "restaurant singer, who you listen to when you are drunk", causing a stir in the Belarusian media. Alekhno later said that he was happy that he did not pass the audition phase and he had little interest in the show. He admitted getting onto the show purely for the fee that Channel One had offered for his participation and said that the producers of the show had been trying to get him to participate for multiple seasons straight.

== Awards ==
- 2000 Winner of contest "Viva Victory"
- 2001 First Prize at the International Competition in Poland
- 2001 Grand Prix of the International Contest of patriotic songs Russia
- 2002 Laureate of the Belarusian Song and poetry
- 2003 Second Prize at the "Golden Hit"
- 2003 "Clear Voice" reward at festival "Crossroads of Europe"
- 2004 Second Prize of the International Festival of "Mallow" (Poland)
- 2004 Winner of the TV channel Russia contest "People's Artist – 2"
- 2005 First Prize of the All-Russian competition of patriotic songs
- 2013 The Award "For contribution to the development of Russian culture"
- 2015 Winner of the TV show "Odin v Odin!"
- 2019 Award of Francysk Skaryna
- 2021 Honored Artist of the Republic of Belarus
- 2022 "Chanson of the Year" Award
- 2022 "Song of the Year" Award

== Personal life ==
Ruslan Alekhno was in a relationship with actress Irina Medvedeva between 2004 and 2011, being married 2009–2011. In 2016, Ruslan married again. His second wife is Yulia Alekhno. On 2017-03-31 a daughter Varvara was born from this marriage.

Alekhno is an Eastern Orthodox believer. He prays every day and vows to go to mass every single Sunday.

Although he was initially reluctant to speak about the 2020-2021 Belarusian protests, Alekhno later took part in the anti-protest song "Lyubimuyu ne otdayut". He however refused to reveal on whom he had voted during the 2020 Belarusian presidential election. Alekhno is considered to be part of the inner circle of Alexander Lukashenko and was seen celebrating New Year's Eve with him in 2020. Alekhno criticised artists withdrawing from and boycotting the 2021 Slavianski Bazaar.

== Discography ==
=== Albums ===
- Rano ili Pozdno (Sooner Or Later) (2005)
- Hasta La Vista (2008)
- Nasledie (Heritage) (2013)
- Ruslan Alehno (2015)
- Ya Podaryu Tebe Lyubov (I'll Give You My Love) (2017)
- Moya Dusha (My Soul) (2019)

=== Music Videos ===
- 2005: "Neobyknovennaya" – Trio with Alexey Chumakov and Aleksandr Panayotov
- 2007: "Serdtse Zemli Moyei" – Duet with Irina Dorofeeva
- 2008: "Hasta La Vista"
- 2012: "Ne Zabyt"
- 2013: "Lyubimaya"
- 2014: "Heart of Glass" – Duet with Valeriya
- 2017: "Spasibo" (Thanks) — OST of movie Red Dog
- 2017: "Samaya Milaya" — Duet with Yaroslav Sumishevsky
- 2018: "Samaya-Samaya" (You're the most)
- 2019: "My Zhivyom" (We're living)

=== Singles ===
- 2005: "Neobiknovennaya" (Необыкновенная, Unusual Girl) – Trio with Alexey Chumakov and Aleksandr Panayotov
- 2007: "Serdtse Zemli Moyei" (Сердце Земли Моей, Heart of my Land) (duet with Irina Dorofeeva)
- 2008: "Hasta la Vista"
- 2009: "Mroja" (Dream)
- 2012: "Ne Zabyt'" (Не Забыть, Can't Be Forgotten)
- 2012: "My Ostanemsya" (Мы Останемся, We'll stay)
- 2013: "Lyubimaya" (Любимая, Beloved)
- 2014: "Serdtse Iz Stekla" (Сердце Из Стекла, Heart Of Glass") (feat Valeriya)

== See also ==
- Belarus in the Eurovision Song Contest

Awards and achievements
Preceded by Koldun with "Work Your Magic"	Belarus in the Eurovision Song Contest; 2008	Succeeded by Petr Elfimov with "Eyes That Never Lie"
