= Presidential Orchestra of the Republic of Belarus =

Belarusian orchestra

- Presidential
- Native name: Прэзідэнцкі аркестр Рэспублікі Беларусь
- Founded: 6 August 2002; 22 years ago
- Location: Minsk, Belarus
- Principal conductor: Viktor Babarikin (since September 2002)

Presidential Orchestra of the Republic of Belarus (Прэзідэнцкі аркестр Рэспублікі Беларусь) is a Belarusian orchestra which is made up of graduates of the Belarusian State Academy of Music (BSAM), the Belarusian State University of Culture and the Minsk Music School. It is one of three major symphonic orchestras in the country. It was founded on August 6, 2002.

The principal conductor and artistic director of the orchestra since September 2002 is Viktor Babarikin, a 2008 graduate of the Belarusian State Academy of Music Department of Opera-Symphonic Conducting. It performs songs such as Muslim Magomayev to Pyotr Ilyich Tchaikovsky.

== Composition ==
It is made up of 57 musicians:

- 2 flutes
- 2 oboes
- 2 clarinets
- 2 bassoons
- 4 saxophones
- 4 horns
- 4 trumpets
- 4 trombones
- 2 percussions
- 2 guitars
- 1 bass guitar
- 2 synthesizers
- 6 first violins
- 5 second violins
- 4 violas
- 5 cellos
- 2 double-basses

== See also ==
- Central Band of the Armed Forces of the Republic of Belarus
- Music of Belarus
- Wind orchestra
- String orchestra
