= Belarus in the Eurovision Song Contest 2005 =

- Eurovision Song Contest 2005
- Participating broadcaster: Belarusian Television and Radio Company (BTRC)
- Country: Belarus
- Selection process: Artist: Evrovidenie 2005 - Otborochny Tur; Song: Internal selection
- Selection date: Artist: 31 January 2005; Song: 18 March 2005

Competing entry
- Song: "Love Me Tonight"
- Artist: Angelica Agurbash
- Songwriters: Nikos Terzis; Nektarios Tyrakis

Placement
- Semi-final result: Failed to qualify (13th)

Participation chronology

Belarus was represented at the Eurovision Song Contest 2005 with the song "Love Me Tonight", composed by Nikos Terzis, with lyrics by Nektarios Tyrakis, and performed by Angelica Agurbash. The Belarusian participating broadcaster, Belarusian Television and Radio Company (BTRC), internally selected its entry after having previously selected the performer through the national final Evrovidenie 2005 - Otborochny Tur.

The national final consisted of two rounds held on 25 December 2004 and 31 January 2005, respectively. In the first round, fourteen competing acts participated in a televised production where public televoting selected the top three entries to qualify to the final. In the final, "Boys and Girls" performed by Angelica Agurbash was initially selected as the winner by a jury panel, however the singer opted to withdraw her song and the replacement entry, "Love Me Tonight", was announced on 18 March 2005.

Belarus competed in the semi-final of the Eurovision Song Contest which took place on 19 May 2005. Performing during the show in position 8, "Love Me Tonight" was not announced among the top 10 entries of the semi-final and therefore did not qualify to compete in the final. It was later revealed that Belarus placed thirteenth out of the 25 participating countries in the semi-final with 67 points.

== Background ==
Prior to the 2005 Contest, Belarusian Television and Radio Company (BTRC) had participated in the Eurovision Song Contest representing Belarus only one time, in 2004. In its debut entry in 2004, the song "My Galileo" performed by Aleksandra and Konstantin failed to qualify to the final where it placed nineteenth in the semi-final. BTRC, which organises the selection of its entry in the Eurovision Song Contest and broadcasts the event in the country as part of its duties as participating broadcaster, organised a national final in 2004 in order to choose its entry. The selection procedure was continued for their 2005 entry.

== Before Eurovision ==
=== Evrovidenie 2005 - Otborochny Tur ===
Evrovidenie 2005 - Otborochny Tur was the national final format developed by BTRC to select the Belarusian entry for the Eurovision Song Contest 2005. Artists and composers were able to submit their applications and entries to the broadcaster between 17 September 2004 and 1 November 2004. At the closing of the deadline, 38 entries were received by the broadcaster. A jury panel was tasked with selecting up to fifteen entries to proceed to the televised national final. The jury consisted of Mihail Finberg (chairman of the jury, director of the State Academic Choir), Vladimir Antipovich (deputy head of the arts department at the Belarusian Ministry of Culture), Valeriy Grebenko (head of the BTRC sound engineers department), Oleg Eliseenkov (composer), Eduard Zaritsky (composer), Leonid Zakhlevny (composer, artistic director of the ensemble Byasyeda), Vladimir Maksimkov (director of the BTRC concert and production directorate), Vasily Rainchik (director of the Youth Variety Theater), Vladimir Ugolnik (head of the variety arts department at the Belarusian State University of Culture and Arts) and Anatoliy Yarmolenko (director of the ensemble Syabry). Thirteen finalists were selected and announced on 17 December 2004, while an additional finalist, Janet, was later announced.

The national final consisted of two rounds. The first round took place on 25 December 2004 at the BTRC studios in Minsk, hosted by Svetlana Borovskaya and Ales Kruglyakov and was televised on the First Channel. Prior to the show, a draw for the running order took place on 22 December 2004. Performances of the competing entries were filmed on 23 and 24 December 2004, and public televoting exclusively selected the top three songs to qualify to the second round. Only the top three placings were announced, but results displayed on screen shortly before the telephone lines were closed showed that Polina Smolova was in the lead with 1,529 votes. In the second round, performances of the three entries were filmed on 27 January 2004 at the Youth Variety Theater in Minsk, and the votes of jury members made up of music professionals selected the song "Boys and Girls" performed by Angelica Agurbash as the winner on 31 January 2005. The jury consisted of Mihail Finberg, Vladimir Antipovich, Valeriy Grebenko, Oleg Eliseenkov, Eduard Zaritsky, Leonid Zakhlevny, Vladimir Maksimkov, Vasily Rainchik, Vladimir Ugolnik, Anatoliy Yarmolenko and members of the national final organising committee.

First Round – 25 December 2004
R/O	Artist	Song	Songwriter(s)	Place
1	Janet	"From Belarus With Love"	Janet Buterus	—N/a
2	Georgiy Koldun	"In Your Eyes"	Georgiy Koldun	—N/a
3	Vesta	"Dze ty" (Дзе ты)	Unknown	—N/a
4	Savanna	"My Best Shoes"	Alex Solomaha, Evgeniy Yakovenko	—N/a
5	Angelica Agurbash	"Boys and Girls"	Alexander Shkuratov	2
6	Polina Smolova	"Smile"	Vladimir Kurlovich, Mikhail Goldenkov	1
7	Natalia Tamelo	"My Love Is Sweet Poison"	Leonid Shirin, Ekaterina Kachina	3
8	Novi Ierusalim	"Melodiya lyubvi" (Мелодия любви)	Vadim Kalatsey, Alexander Patlis	—N/a
9	Velesa Lyulkevich	"Chocolate"	Unknown	—N/a
10	Gunesh Abasova	"Nazovi menya po imeni" (Назови меня по имени)	Sergey Sukhomlin	—N/a
11	Ruslan Musvidas	"Portrety" (Портреты)	Veronika Musvidas	—N/a
12	Alexandra Gaiduk	"Just Say You Love Me"	Arnis Mednis, Sergey Panamorev	—N/a
13	Anastasiya Kuzmitskaya	"Negromkaya lyubov" (Негромкая любовь)	Unknown	—N/a
14	Corriana	"You Break Me"	Leonid Shirin, Ekaterina Kachina	—N/a

Second Round – 31 January 2005
Artist	Song	Place
Angelica Agurbash	"Boys and Girls"	1
Natalia Tamelo	"My Love Is Sweet Poison"	3
Polina Smolova	"Smile"	2

=== Song selection ===
Following the Belarusian national final, Angelica Agurbash stated that she could be changing her contest song following public feedback and upon receiving new proposals from composers. Three songs, including a new version of "Boys and Girls" recorded at the Abbey Road Studios in London, were under consideration and a public poll was also opened on Agurbash's official website in order to provide consultation on which song should be selected. On 18 March 2005, BTRC announced that Angelica Agurbash would be performing the song "Love Me Tonight" at the 2005 Eurovision Song Contest, which officially replaced "Boys and Girls" as the Belarusian entry through the decision of jury members made up of music professionals. The song was presented to the public via the release of the official music video on 22 March 2005.

Song selection – 18 March 2005
Song	Songwriter(s)
"Boys and Girls"	Alexander Shkuratov
"Love Me Tonight"	Nikos Terzis, Nektarios Tyrakis
"Show Me Your Love"	Svika Pick, Mirit Shem-Or

=== Promotion ===
To specifically promote "Love Me Tonight" as the Belarusian Eurovision entry, Angelica Agurbash made appearances in 17 countries across Europe between 11 April and 10 May 2005.

== At Eurovision ==
According to Eurovision rules, all nations with the exceptions of the host country, the "Big Four" (France, Germany, Spain, and the United Kingdom) and the ten highest placed finishers in the 2004 contest are required to qualify from the semi-final on 19 May 2005 in order to compete for the final on 21 May 2005; the top ten countries from the semi-final progress to the final. On 22 March 2005, an allocation draw was held which determined the running order for the semi-final. Belarus was drawn to perform in position 8, following the entry from Israel and before the entry from the Netherlands.

The semi-final and the final were broadcast in Belarus on the First Channel with commentary by Ales Kruglyakov. BTRC appointed Elena Ponomareva as its spokesperson to announce the results of the Belarusian televote during the final.

=== Semi-final ===
Angelica Agurbash took part in technical rehearsals on 12 and 14 May, followed by dress rehearsals on 18 and 19 May. Prior to the semi-final, Belarus was considered by bookmakers to be the fourth most likely country to advance into the final.

The Belarusian performance featured Angelica Agurbash performing a choreographed routine on stage wearing a golden outfit together with four male backing dancers wearing denim outfits with white collars which was based on the Tsarist court servants. Agurbash's outfit was removed twice during the performance, firstly revealing a blue and gold dress designed by Russian designer Valentin Yudashkin who based the design on the Catherine II collection, and secondly a golden skin-tight body suit containing Swarovski crystals. Agurbash was also joined by two on-stage backing vocalists: Chryso Stamatopoulou and Victoria Chalkitis.

At the end of the show, Belarus was not announced among the top 10 entries in the semi-final and therefore failed to qualify to compete in the final. It was later revealed that Belarus placed thirteenth in the semi-final, receiving a total of 67 points.

=== Voting ===
Below is a breakdown of points awarded to Belarus and awarded by Belarus in the semi-final and grand final of the contest. The nation awarded its 12 points to Israel in the semi-final and to Russia in the final of the contest.

==== Points awarded to Belarus ====
Points awarded to Belarus (Semi-final)
Score	Country
12 points	Bulgaria
10 points	Russia
8 points	Greece
7 points	Cyprus; Malta
6 points	Macedonia
5 points	
4 points	Ukraine
3 points	Latvia; Lithuania; Turkey
2 points	Israel
1 point	Monaco; Poland

==== Points awarded by Belarus ====
Points awarded by Belarus (Semi-final)
Score	Country
12 points	Israel
10 points	Moldova
8 points	Switzerland
7 points	Latvia
6 points	Poland
5 points	Norway
4 points	Hungary
3 points	Romania
2 points	Slovenia
1 point	Croatia

Points awarded by Belarus (Final)
Score	Country
12 points	Russia
10 points	Switzerland
8 points	Israel
7 points	Moldova
6 points	Latvia
5 points	Malta
4 points	Norway
3 points	Serbia and Montenegro
2 points	Hungary
1 point	Romania
