= Ruslan =

Ruslan may refer to:

- Ruslan (given name), including a list of people and fictional characters
- Ruslan (film), a 2009 film starring Steven Segal
- Ruslaan, a 2024 Indian film
- Antonov An-124 Ruslan, large Soviet cargo aircraft, later built in Ukraine and Russia
- Ruslan (ship), a Russian cargo ship in the Third Aliyah in 1919

== See also ==
- Aslan (disambiguation), cognate
- Rusian (disambiguation)
- Ruslan and Ludmila (disambiguation)
