= Aleksandra and Konstantin =

Belarusian musical duo

Aleksandra and Konstantin Аляксандра і Канстанцін
- Also known as: Aliaksandra i Kanstantsin
- Origin: Belarus
- Genres: Pop rock
- Years active: 1998–present
- Labels: Ковчег, West Records, Vigma
- Members: Aleksandra Kirsanova; Konstantin Drapezo

Aleksandra and Konstantin (Belarusian: Аляксандра і Канстанцін, Aliaksandra i Kanstantsin) is a Belarusian musical duo composed of singer Aleksandra Kirsanova (Belarusian: Аляксандра Кірсанава, Aliaksandra Kirsanava) and guitarist Konstantin Drapezo (Belarusian: Канстанцін Драпеза, Kanstantsin Drapeza).

The duo was formed in 1998. They represented Belarus in their inaugural entry in the Eurovision Song Contest, singing "My Galileo" in the 2004 Contest. which failed to qualify to the final scoring only 10 points tying with Monaco for 19th place from a pool of 22. One of their backing singers during the performance, Petr Elfimov, represented Belarus 5 years later at the Eurovision 2009 Contest in Moscow.

== Discography ==
=== Albums ===
- За ліхімі за марозамі (Ковчег, 2001)
- Сойка (2003)
- A&K Лепшае (West Records, 2004)
- Аўтаномная Навігацыя (West Records, 2006)
- Ключы златыя (Vigma, 2009)
- М1 (Vigma, 2013)

== EPs ==
- My Galileo. The Best (2004)
- Масьленіца (2011)

Awards and achievements
Preceded by None	Belarus in the Eurovision Song Contest; 2004	Succeeded by Angelica Agurbash with "Love Me Tonight"
