= Ruslan Akhmadullin =

Russian ice hockey forward

- Born: January 26, 1982 (age 43) Ufa, Russian SFSR, Soviet Union
- Height: 6 ft 0 in (183 cm)
- Weight: 225 lb (102 kg; 16 st 1 lb)
- Position: Forward
- Played for: Salavat Yulaev Ufa
- Playing career: 2000–2012

Ruslan Akhmadullin (born January 26, 1982) is a Russian former professional ice hockey forward.

Akhmadullin spent one season playing in the junior Ontario Hockey League for the Kitchener Rangers after they selected him 10th overall in the 1999 CHL Import Draft. He scored 12 goals and 12 assists in 58 games during the 1999–00 OHL season before returning to his native Ufa in Russia, joining Salavat Yulaev Ufa of the Russian Superleague. He spent three seasons with Salavat Yulaev between 2000 and 2003, playing 57 games and scoring six goals and four assists.

Akhmadullin then played one season in the second-tier Vysshaya Liga for Dinamo-Energija Yekaterinburg before playing the remainder of his career in the third-tier Pervaya Liga.
