= Ruslan and Ludmila (disambiguation) =

Ruslan and Ludmila is a poem by Aleksandr Pushkin, published in 1820.

Ruslan and Ludmila can also refer to several works based on the Pushkin poem:

- Ruslan and Ludmila (1821 ballet), 1821 ballet by Adam Glushkovsky to music by Friedrich Scholz
- Ruslan and Ludmila (film), a 1972 film directed by Aleksandr Ptushko
- Ruslan and Lyudmila (opera), an 1842 opera composed by Mikhail Glinka based on the poem by Pushkin

== See also ==
- Ruslan (disambiguation)
