= Polina Smolova =

Belarusian pop singer

Polina Smolova Паліна Смолава
- Born: Polina Smolova; 3 September 1980 (age 45); Minsk, Byelorussian SSR, Soviet Union (now Belarus)
- Origin: Belarus
- Occupation: Singer

Polina Petrovna Smolova (Belarusian: Паліна Пятроўна Смолава, romanized: Palina Piatroǔna Smolava, Russian: Полина Петровна Смолова; born 3 September 1980) is a Belarusian pop singer and the Belarusian entry for the Eurovision Song Contest 2006 with the song Mum, with which she took part in the Eurovision semi-final. She performed 5th in the running order but failed to qualify for the final placing 22nd out of 23 accumulating a total of 10 points.

== Biography ==
Polina Smolova started her singing career in the children folk bands. In 2012, Polina attempted to represent Russia at the Eurovision Song Contest 2012 with the song "Michael" about Michael Jackson. She placed seventh in the Russian national selection. She once again attempted to represent Russia in the 2014 contest with the song "Sometimes" but failed to get chosen from the internal selection.

On 11 November 2017 she gave birth to a son.

Awards and achievements
Preceded by Angelica Agurbash with "Love Me Tonight"	Belarus in the Eurovision Song Contest; 2006	Succeeded by Koldun with "Work Your Magic"
