= Irina Dorofeeva =

Belarusian singer and politician

Irina Dorofeeva Ірына Дарафеева
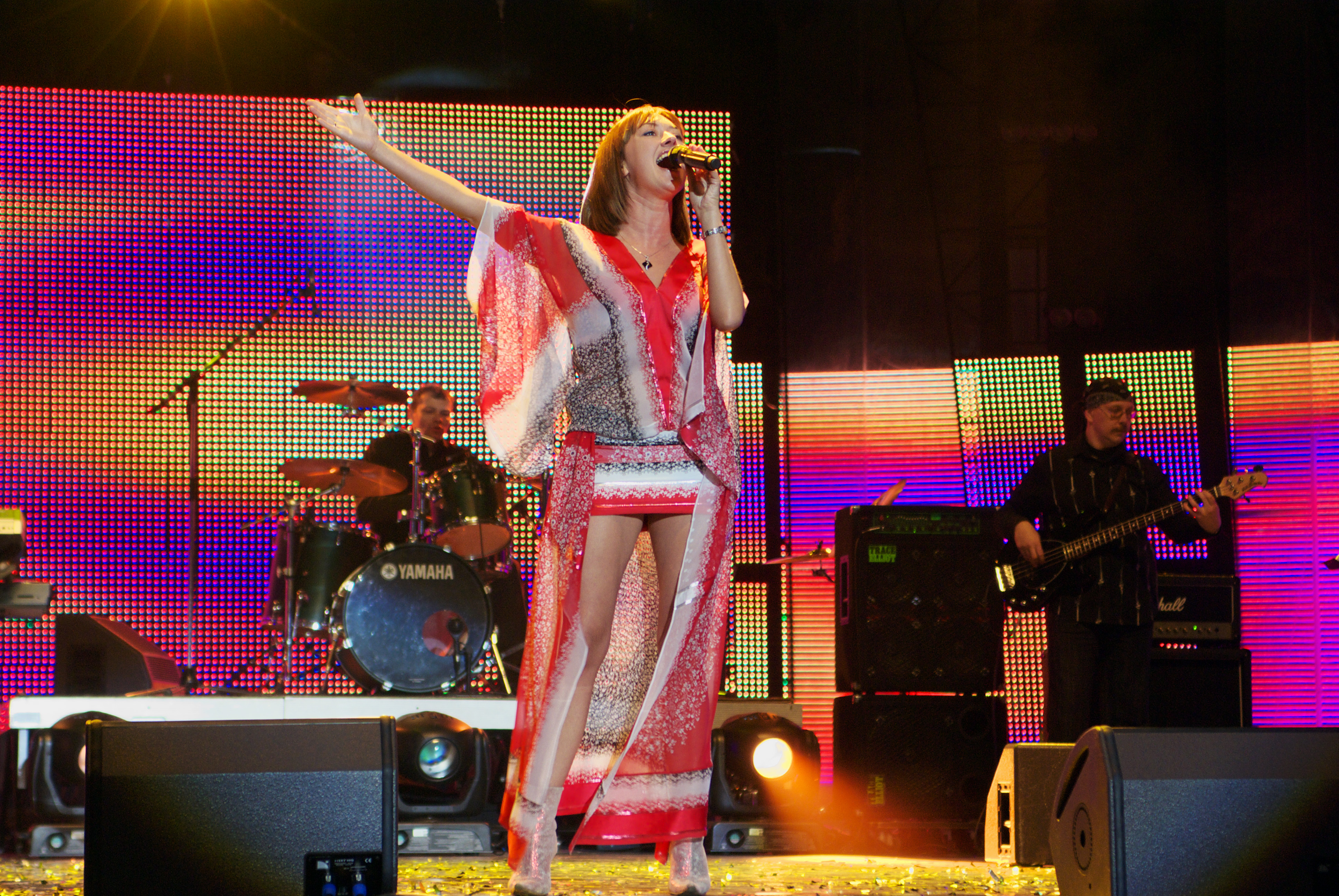

Background information
- Born: 6 July 1977 (age 49); Mogilev, Byelorussian SSR, Soviet Union
- Genre: Popular
- Occupation: Singer
- Instrument: Singing

Irina Arkadyevna Dorofeeva (Note: Belarusian: Ірына Аркадзьеўна Дарафеева, romanized: Iryna Arkadz′yewna Darafyeyeva; Russian: Ирина Аркадьевна Дорофеева, romanized: Irina Arkadyevna Dorofeyeva) (born 6 July 1977) is a singer from Belarus.

== Eurovision Song Contest 2011 ==
On January 15, 2011, National State Television and Radio Company of the Republic of Belarus announced that Dorofeeva will represent Belarus in the Eurovision Song Contest 2011 but she was replaced by Anastasia Vinnikova.

== Awards ==
Honoured Artist of the Republic of Belarus
