= Vasily Rainchik =

Belarusian musician and composer

Vasil Pyatrovič Rainčyk (Belarusian: Васіль Пятро́віч Раінчык, Russian: Василий Петрович Раинчик) (born March 7 1950, village Charapy, Mogilev Region, Belarus), also Vasily Rainchik, is a Belarusian musician and composer and also a professor at the Belarus University of Culture, Minsk, Belarus. He was also the leader of Vierasy, an early Belarusian pop music band.

In 1994 he became musical director and in 2000 artistic director he became artistic director of the State Youth Variety Theater (Моладзевы тэатар эстрады) of the Belarus University of Culture.

== Awards ==
- 1980: Belarus Komsomol prize
- 1982: Honored Artist of the Byelorussian SSR
- 1985: People's Artist of Belarus
- 2006: Order of Francysk Skaryna
- 2006: Certificate of Honor from the National Assembly of the Republic of Belarus

== Personal ==
Married to Irina Tsvetkova (Ирина Цветкова). Their only son Sergey died in 2020 (at the age of 48). Grandson: Vasily (23 years in 2020).
