= Turkvision Song Contest 2020 =

4th Turkvision Song Contest

- Türkvizyon Istanbul 2020

Date and venue
- Final: 20 December 2020
- Venue: Istanbul, Turkey (hosted online)

Organisation
- Host broadcaster: Turkish Music Box Television (TMB)
- Presenters: Esra Balamir; Refik Sarıöz; Nermin Barıs

Participants
- Number of entries: 26
- Debuting countries: Iraqi Turkmens; Kazakh Uyghurs; Moldova; Nogais; Poland; Tyumen Oblast
- Returning countries: Bashkortostan; Khakassia; Moscow; Tatarstan; Tuva; Yakutia
- Non-returning countries: Bulgaria; Georgia; Iran; Iraq; Kosovo; Syria; Uzbekistan
- Participation map: Participating countries Countries that participated in the past but not in 2020

Vote
- Voting system: A juror from each region scores all songs from 1 to 10 points.
- Winning song: Ukraine "Tikenli yol"

The Turkvision Song Contest 2020 (Turkish: Türkvizyon Şarkı Yarışması 2020) was the fourth edition of the Turkvision Song Contest. It took place in Istanbul, Turkey, with performances filmed remotely, and organised by Turkish Music Box Television (TMB TV).

The contest took place on 20 December 2020. Twenty-six Turkic regions, which have either a large Turkic population or a widely spoken Turkic language, participated in the contest. The Iraqi Turkmens, the Kazakh Uyghurs, Moldova, the Nogais, Poland and Tyumen Oblast made their debuts in the contest, while Bashkortostan, Khakassia, Moscow, Tatarstan, Tuva and Yakutia returned to the contest, having been absent in 2015.

Ukraine won the contest with the song "Tikenli yol" performed by Natalie Papazoglu. Yakutia and Bosnia and Herzegovina placed second and third respectively, with Yakutia, Bosnia and Herzegovina, Germany, Moscow, Gagauzia, Khakassia, Serbia and Tuva achieving their highest placings in the contest to date.

== Background ==
Prior to 2020, the Turkvision Song Contest had not been held since 2015. A fourth edition was initially planned for 2016, to be hosted at the Yahya Kemal Beyatli Cultural Centre in Istanbul, but it was cancelled (ostensibly due to the Istanbul bombings throughout 2016). They subsequently attempted to host a 2017 edition in Kazakhstan, but to no avail, and plans to revive the contest in 2018 failed as well. Several of the songs competing in the 2020 contest were originally set to compete in the cancelled 2016 contest.

In October 2020, it was reported that TMB TV would host an online-only version of the contest from Istanbul.

== Format ==
All performances were intended to be filmed by 15 November 2020 (although several participants filmed their entries after that date), with participants either chosen by national/regional broadcasters or through submitting their entries directly.

=== Voting ===
The jury was composed of one person per participating region, chosen by their region's head of delegation. Each juror scored every song from 0 to 10 points, and the song with the most points won. The jurors awarded their points via satellite link, and the chair of the jury was Belarusian singer Gunesh, who previously finished as runner-up for her country at the 2013 contest. The top three entrants will receive cash prizes, and the winner would receive a direct invitation to the Turkvision Song Contest 2021 in Shusha, Azerbaijan and the opportunity to film a music video for their entry. It was later revealed that the 2021 edition would be taking place in Turkistan, Kazakhstan instead, but in the end, the 2021 contest did not materialize. There was also an audience sympathy prize for the "Sari Gelin" cover that received the most votes on the contest website. The performances were ranked by the following jurors from each country participating in the contest:

- Albania – Avni Qahili
- Azerbaijan – Kenan Çelik
- Bashkortostan – Aigul Akhmadeeva
- Belarus – Gunesh (chairperson)
- Bosnia and Herzegovina – Ahmed Švrakić
- Gagauzia – Petr Petkovic
- Germany – Volkan Gucer
- Iraqi Turkmens – Ahmet Tuzlu
- Kazakh Uyghurs – Polat Izimov
- Kazakhstan – Marat Omarov
- Khakassia – German Tanbaev
- Kyrgyzstan – Gulnur Satylganova
- Moldova – Ivan Kain
- Moscow – Leush Lyubich
- Nogais – Ayna Cherkesova
- North Macedonia – Erhan Hasip
- Northern Cyprus – Ertan Birinci
- Poland – Dawid Szwajcowski
- Romania – Cengiz Erhan Kutluakay
- Serbia – Denis Mavrić
- Tatarstan – Damir Davletshin
- Turkey – Selim Gülgören
- Tuva –
- Tyumen Oblast – Kabirov Mansur Mannurovich
- Ukraine – Nadezhda Malenkova
- Yakutia – Chyskyyray

== Participating regions ==
The contest took place on Sunday 20 December at 16:00 TRT. The interval act consisted of Natali Deniz performing "Sarmaş bana". The following countries and regions participated in the contest:

R/O	Region	Artist	Song	Language	Points	Place
1	Albania	Ilire Ismajli	"Përsëri"	Albanian, Turkish	171	19
2	Nogais	Zhanna Musayeva	"Muñayma" (Мунъайма)	Nogai	159	24
3	Bashkortostan	Ziliya Bahtieva	"Halkyma" (Халҡыма)	Bashkir	174	17
4	Bosnia and Herzegovina	Armin Muzaferija	"Džehva"	Bosnian	194	3
5	Northern Cyprus	Çağıl İşgüzar	"Acıtır Hep Hayallerim"	Turkish	171	21
6	North Macedonia	Cengiz Sipahi	"Kal Yanımda"	Turkish	171	20
7	Tuva	Omak Chopanovich Oorzhak	"Bayla la Talgam" (Байла ла Талгам)	Tuvan	176	15
8	Azerbaijan	Aydan İlxaszade	"Can Can Qardaş Can"	Azerbaijani	193	5
9	Poland	Mishelle	"Doğma yerlər"	Azerbaijani	172	18
10	Tatarstan	Diliya Ahmetshina	"Ğafu it, awılım" (Гафу ит, авылым)	Tatar	191	6
11	Germany	Seyran Ismayilkhanov	"Odun"	Turkish	190	8
12	Iraqi Turkmens	Sarmad Mahmood	"Kelebek"	Iraqi Turkmen	150	26
13	Gagauzia	Yulia Arnaut	"Kemençä"	Gagauz	185	10
14	Khakassia	Darya Tacheyeva	"Ot chalynda" (От чалында)	Khakas	181	11
15	Ukraine	Natalie Papazoglu	"Tikenli yol"	Gagauz	226	1
16	Serbia	Haris Skarep	"Doživotno osuđen" (Доживотно осуђен)	Serbian	178	13
17	Kyrgyzstan	Aiganysh Abdieva	"Yupiter" (Юпитер)	Kyrgyz	176	16
18	Belarus	Svetlana Agarval	"Məni anla"	Azerbaijani	166	23
19	Moscow	Olga Shimanskaya	"Hadi Gel"	Turkish	186	9
20	Romania	Sunai Giolacai	"Niye?"	Turkish	167	22
21	Kazakhstan	Almaz Kopzhasar	"Kim ol" (Кім ол)	Kazakh	159	25
22	Moldova	Pelageya Stefoglo	"Ateş Gibi"	Turkish	191	7
23	Yakutia	Umsuura	"Mokhsoğollor" (Мохсоҕоллор)	Yakut	204	2
24	Tyumen Oblast	Adilya Tushakova	"Havalarda" (Һаваларда)	Siberian Tatar	193	4
25	Turkey	Ertan & İsrafil	"Ne Yaptıysam Olmadı"	Turkish	179	12
26	Kazakh Uyghurs	Sada Ensemble	"Sevgiyi besle"	Uyghur	178	14

=== Audience sympathy prize ===
The audience sympathy prize is in the running between 14 of the national representatives, who each recorded a cover of the famous folk song "Sari Gelin". Moscow's cover, which received the most online votes, won the prize. Voting opened on 15 December 2020 and closed on 1 January 2021. The following countries and artists competed:

- Azerbaijan – Aydan İlxaszade
- Bashkortostan – Ziliya Bahtieva
- Gagauzia – Yulia Arnaut
- Germany – Seyran Ismayilkhanov
- Iraqi Turkmens – Sarmad Mahmood
- Kyrgyzstan – Aiganysh Abdieva
- Moscow – Olga Shimanskaya
- North Macedonia – Cengiz Sipahi
- Northern Cyprus – Çağıl İşgüzar
- Poland – Mishelle
- Romania – Sunai Giolacai
- Tatarstan – Diliya Ahmetshina
- Turkey – Ertan & İsrafil
- Ukraine – Natalie Papazoglu

== Scoreboard ==
The table below summarizes the point distribution as shown during the show. For each song, the official total score may sometimes differ from a direct sum of the individual scores received.

		Jury results																											
		Official total score	Raw total score	Albania	Nogais	Bashkortostan	Bosnia and Herzegovina	Northern Cyprus	North Macedonia	Tuva	Azerbaijan	Poland	Tatarstan	Germany	Iraqi Turkmens	Gagauzia	Khakassia	Ukraine	Serbia	Kyrgyzstan	Belarus	Moscow	Romania	Kazakhstan	Moldova	Yakutia	Tyumen Oblast	Turkey	Kazakh Uyghurs
Contestants	Albania	171	164		8	8	10	8	10	6	4	5	8	6	7	7	8	7	7	5	7	9	6	4	7	2	7	4	4
Contestants	Nogais	159	167	8		9	8	7	9	6	3	7	8	8	8	7	9	7	0	4	8	8	8	6	8	4	8	4	5
Contestants	Bashkortostan	174	174	8	8		8	7	9	10	5	10	10	8	8	10	10	9	0	5	9	0	7	4	7	3	8	6	5
Contestants	Bosnia and Herzegovina	194	188	10	8	9		8	10	7	5	7	8	9	8	8	10	7	10	6	8	9	6	5	8	3	8	7	4
Contestants	Northern Cyprus	171	163	8	7	8	8		10	7	9	4	8	5	10	7	7	8	0	4	8	7	6	4	8	3	6	7	4
Contestants	North Macedonia	171	165	10	7	7	10	8		6	4	3	8	6	9	7	7	8	9	5	7	8	7	4	7	3	6	5	4
Contestants	Tuva	176	166	8	8	8	8	7	7		3	5	8	7	7	7	10	7	0	7	6	6	8	6	9	4	9	6	5
Contestants	Azerbaijan	193	193	10	9	9	8	9	9	6		8	5	7	10	5	8	10	6	5	10	9	8	9	7	4	7	6	9
Contestants	Poland	172	169	8	6	9	9	7	8	6	4		8	9	7	10	8	7	2	7	8	10	6	3	9	3	7	4	4
Contestants	Tatarstan	191	190	9	9	10	8	8	7	8	7	9		10	8	9	9	9	0	6	7	9	8	6	9	4	8	6	7
Contestants	Germany	190	190	9	9	10	8	8	10	6	6	10	9		9	7	10	9	5	9	8	7	9	4	8	3	9	4	4
Contestants	Iraqi Turkmens	150	149	8	7	8	8	7	8	5	3	5	8	6		7	10	7	0	5	7	6	7	3	7	3	7	3	4
Contestants	Gagauzia	185	185	8	8	10	8	9	8	6	4	8	8	6	7		10	9	0	9	8	9	9	6	9	4	7	7	8
Contestants	Khakassia	181	182	9	9	10	8	7	8	10	4	4	8	7	8	10		8	0	8	9	6	8	6	9	4	7	7	8
Contestants	Ukraine	226	219	8	10	10	9	7	9	9	10	10	10	9	9	10	7		4	10	10	10	10	8	10	2	10	8	10
Contestants	Serbia	178	178	8	7	10	10	6	9	7	4	9	8	8	7	7	8	8		10	6	8	7	2	8	3	8	6	4
Contestants	Kyrgyzstan	176	175	9	7	9	8	8	7	6	4	9	8	8	8	8	8	9	0		9	9	7	5	8	3	7	7	4
Contestants	Belarus	166	166	9	6	6	8	8	7	7	6	5	8	7	7	9	9	8	1	5		10	6	4	9	3	8	5	5
Contestants	Moscow	186	186	8	9	8	10	6	10	9	6	10	8	5	8	9	10	9	0	6	10		8	4	8	3	9	7	6
Contestants	Romania	167	167	8	6	9	8	7	9	6	5	3	8	6	7	8	8	8	0	6	8	8		7	8	3	9	5	7
Contestants	Kazakhstan	159	157	9	5	7	9	8	7	5	4	4	8	4	9	7	8	7	0	6	6	8	6		7	3	6	4	10
Contestants	Moldova	191	183	8	8	10	8	7	9	7	7	8	8	8	8	9	10	9	0	7	8	9	8	5		3	8	6	5
Contestants	Yakutia	204	204	9	8	10	8	8	10	10	5	10	8	7	8	8	10	10	0	10	9	9	9	8	8		9	6	7
Contestants	Tyumen Oblast	193	163	9	7	7	8	8	8	6	4	6	8	7	8	8	7	7	0	5	8	7	6	5	7	3		8	6
Contestants	Turkey	179	179	10	6	7	10	9	8	5	10	6	8	5	10	8	7	9	8	6	8	9	6	3	8	3	7		3
Contestants	Kazakh Uyghurs	178	175	10	7	7	9	8	8	5	7	9	8	4	8	7	7	7	3	5	8	7	7	10	7	3	7	7	

== Other regions ==
- Netherlands – The Netherlands had initially confirmed their participation in the 2020 contest with Elcan Rzayev as their representative with the song "Ana – Vətən". However, Rzayev withdrew from the competition, as he was to unable to film his entry due to COVID-19 restrictions in the Netherlands. The Netherlands' non-participation was confirmed by the release of the running order by the contest organisers.
- Sweden – Sweden had initially confirmed their participation at the 2020 contest with the singer Arghavan and the song "Dirçəliş". However, on 12 December 2020, it was announced that Sweden had withdrawn from the contest. According to Eurovoix World, the country's withdrawal was caused by the inability of the Swedish singer to film a performance that was up to the standards of the competition.

== Broadcasters and commentators ==
Country	Channel	Ref.
Azerbaijan	ATV	
Bosnia and Herzegovina	Hayat Music	
Germany	Düğün TV (Note: The broadcast was deferred to a later date.)	
Kazakhstan	Novoe Televidenie	
Kyrgyzstan	KTRK Muzik	
Kyrgyzstan	Tumar TV	
Moldova	GRT	
Northern Cyprus	Kıbrıs Genç TV	
Romania	Alpha Media TV	
Romania	Media TV	
Russia	Salyam TV	
Russia	BEZ	
Serbia	RTV Novi Pazar	
Turkey	TMB TV	
