= Turkvision Song Contest 2014 =

2nd Turkvision Song Contest

- Türkvizyon Kazan 2014

Dates and venue
- Semi-final: 19 November 2014
- Final: 21 November 2014
- Venue: TatNeft Arena, Kazan, Tatarstan

Organisation
- Executive supervisor: İsmet Zaatov

Production
- Host broadcaster: Maydan Television (MTV)
- Director: Damir Davletshin
- Executive producer: Islam Bagirov
- Presenters: Artem Shalimov; Narmin Agaeva; Ranil Nuriov

Participants
- Number of entries: 25
- Debuting countries: Albania; Bulgaria; Germany; Iran; Moscow; Turkmenistan
- Non-returning countries: Altai Republic; Belarus; Kemerovo; Kosovo; Northern Cyprus
- Participation map: Participating countries Did not qualify from the semi-final Countries that participated in the past but not in 2014

Vote
- Voting system: A juror from each region evaluates all the songs on a 10 point system.
- Winning song: Kazakhstan; "Izin kórem"

The Turkvision Song Contest 2014 (Turkish: Türkvizyon Şarkı Yarışması 2014) was the second edition of the Turkvision Song Contest, which took place in Kazan in the region of Tatarstan. Twenty-four Turkic regions, which have either a large Turkic population or a widely spoken Turkic language, confirmed their participation, making it the largest contest exceeding the participation number for the 2013 contest whereas four European countries (Albania, Bulgaria, Germany and Russia) made their debut. Altai Republic, Belarus, Kemerovo, Kosovo, and Northern Cyprus withdrew from the contest. The semi final took place on 19 November 2014 and the final took place on 21 November 2014. The presenters of the contest were Artem Shalimov, Narmin Agaeva, and Ranil Nuriov.

== Location ==
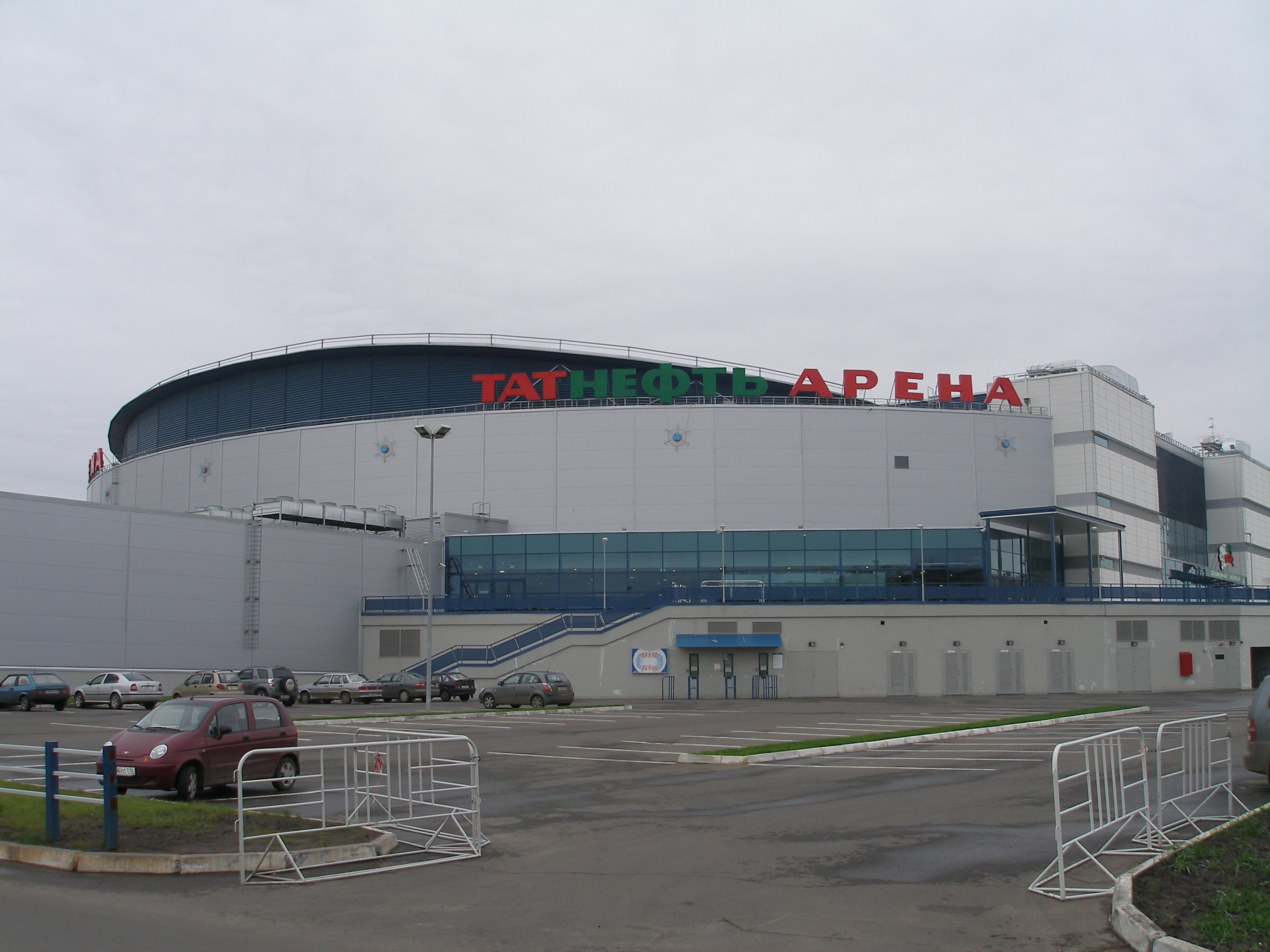
TatNeft Arena is the venue for the Turkvision Song Contest 2014

On 15 October 2013, it was announced that the hosts for Turkvision 2014 will be Kazan, Tatarstan. Kazan is the capital and largest city of the Republic of Tatarstan, Russia. With a population of 1,143,535, it is the eighth most populous city in Russia. Kazan lies at the confluence of the Volga and Kazanka Rivers in European Russia.

The TatNeft Arena, an indoor sporting arena, was chosen as the host venue for the 2014 contest. The capacity of the arena is 10,000 and was opened in 2005. The arena is home to Ak Bars Kazan of the Kontinental Hockey League.

== Format ==
The contest consisted of a semi-final held on 19 November 2014, and a grand final which took place on the evening of 21 November 2014. Twenty-five participating regions took part in the semi-final, of which twelve were to qualify and proceeded to the grand final. This was later changed to fifteen qualifiers, after it was discovered that voting fraud had occurred from Turkmenistan}}, who had awarded themselves 5 points. Also the total score for Bosnia and Herzegovina}} was miscalculated on the scoring system, and had totalled up more points than they actually received.

=== National host broadcaster ===
Maydan Television (MTV) was the host broadcaster for the 2014 contest.

== Participating countries and regions ==
=== Returning artists ===
Eldar Zhanikaev, Genghiz Erhan Cutcalai, and Ahmet Tuzlu returned to the contest for a second consecutive year, representing the joint-region of Kabardino-Balkaria & Karachay-Cherkessia, Romania, and Iraq respectively. Zhanikaev's previous entry was entitled "Adamdi Bizni Atibiz" (His name is Adam), while Tuzlu's last entry was entitled "Kerkük'ten Yola Çikak" (Out from Kirkuk).

=== Semi-final ===
The semi-final took place at the TatNeft Arena at 19:00 MSK on 19 November 2014.

Draw	Region	Artist	Song	Language	Points	Place
1	Kazakhstan	Zhanar Dugalova	"Izin kórem" (Ізін көрем)	Kazakh	198	3
2	Germany	Fahrettin Güneş	"Sevdiğim"	Turkish	149	21
3	Turkmenistan	Züleýha Kakaýewa	"Şykga Şykga Bilezik"	Turkmen	164	15
4	Georgia	Ayla Shiriyeva & Aysel Mamedova	"Tenhayam"	Azerbaijani	141	25
5	Uzbekistan	Aziza Nizamova	"Dunyo boʻlsin omon"	Uzbek	172	10
6	Albania	Xhoi Bejko	"Hava ve Ates"	Turkish, Albanian	154	19
7	Gagauzia	Maria Topal	"Aaladım"	Gagauz	162	16
8	Ukraine	Natali Deniz	"Sän benim"	Gagauz	148	23
9	Iran	Barış Grubu	"Heydər Baba" (حیدر بابا)	Azerbaijani	178	9
10	Kabardino-Balkaria &; Karachay-Cherkessia	Eldar Zhanikaev	"Barama" (Барама)	Karachay-Balkar	148	24
11	Tatarstan	Aydar Suleymanov	"Atlar çaba" (Атлар чаба)	Tatar	223	1
12	Moscow	Kazan World	"Sine kötäm" (Сине көтәм)	Tatar	190	5
13	Kyrgyzstan	Non-Stop	"Seze bil" (Сезе бил)	Kyrgyz	190	6
14	Yakutia	Vladlena Ivanova	"Kyn" (Күн)	Yakut	168	12
15	Turkey	Funda Kılıç	"Hoppa"	Turkish	199	2
16	Bosnia and Herzegovina	Mensur Salkić	"Šutim/Susuyorum"	Bosnian	168	13
17	Bashkortostan	Zaman	"Kubair" (Кубаир)	Bashkir	193	4
18	Bulgaria	İsmail Matev	"Yollara, Taşlara"	Turkish	168	11
19	Iraq	Ahmet Tuzlu	"Çal Kalbimi"	Azerbaijani	155	18
20	Crimea	Darina Siniçkina	"Gider isen" (Гидер исен)	Crimean Tatar	178	8
21	Azerbaijan	Elvin Ordubadli	"Divlərin yalnızlığı"	Azerbaijani	166	14
22	Romania	Cengiz Erhan & Alev Gafar	"Genclik Basa Bir Gelir"	Turkish	158	17
23	Macedonia	Kaan Mazhar	"Yolumu Bulurum"	Turkish	181	7
24	Khakassia	Sayana Saburova	"Alzhaas"	Khakas	148	22
25	Tuva	Ayas Kuular	"Subedei"	Tuvan	151	20

=== Final ===
The Final took place at the TatNeft Arena at 19:00 MSK on 21 November 2014.

Draw	Region	Artist	Song	Language	Points	Place
1	Turkey	Funda Kılıç	"Hoppa"	Turkish	128	15
2	Crimea	Darina Siniçkina	"Gider isen" (Гидер исен)	Crimean Tatar	186	6
3	Kazakhstan	Zhanar Dugalova	"Izin kórem" (Ізін көрем)	Kazakh	225	1
4	Uzbekistan	Aziza Nizamova	"Dunyo boʻlsin omon"	Uzbek	183	7
5	Iran	Barış Grubu	"Heydər Baba" (حیدر بابا)	Azerbaijani	167	13
6	Bashkortostan	Zaman	"Kubair" (Кубаир)	Bashkir	199	3
7	Kyrgyzstan	Non-Stop	"Seze bil" (Сезе бил)	Kyrgyz	196	4
8	Turkmenistan	Züleýha Kakaýewa	"Şykga Şykga Bilezik"	Turkmen	192	5
9	Yakutia	Vladlena Ivanova	"Kyn" (Күн)	Yakut	183	7
10	Bulgaria	İsmail Matev	"Yollara, Taşlara"	Turkish	172	11
11	Azerbaijan	Elvin Ordubadli	"Divlərin yalnızlığı"	Azerbaijani	177	9
12	Bosnia and Herzegovina	Mensur Salkić	"Šutim/Susuyorum"	Bosnian	176	10
13	Macedonia	Kaan Mazhar	"Yolumu Bulurum"	Turkish	166	14
14	Moscow	Kazan World	"Sine kötäm" (Сине көтәм)	Tatar	170	12
15	Tatarstan	Aydar Suleymanov	"Atlar çaba" (Атлар чаба)	Tatar	201	2

== Scoreboard ==
=== Semi-final ===
		Results																									
		Total score	Kazakhstan	Germany	Turkmenistan	Georgia	Uzbekistan	Albania	Găgăuzia	Ukraine	Iran	Kabardino-Balkaria and Karachay-Cherkessia	Tatarstan	Moscow	Kyrgyzstan	Yakutia	Turkey	Bosnia and Herzegovina	Bashkortostan	Bulgaria	Iraq	Crimea	Azerbaijan	Romania	Macedonia	Khakassia	Tuva
Contestants	Kazakhstan	198		7	10	10	10	7	7	7	7	10	9	7	10	10	1	9	9	7	7	10	10	9	5	10	10
Contestants	Germany	149	7		7	5	6	5	8	6	5	7	8	6	9	7	4	4	8	10	5	8	5	1	8	5	5
Contestants	Turkmenistan	164	9	6		9	7	8	8	10	5	7	7	6	8	8	5	4	9	5	7	9	9	1	4	6	7
Contestants	Georgia	141	6	7	5		6	4	7	5	5	8	5	5	6	7	7	5	6	5	6	6	10	5	4	6	5
Contestants	Uzbekistan	172	8	10	8	6		5	8	9	6	7	8	5	8	8	7	6	7	5	7	8	8	9	6	7	6
Contestants	Albania	154	6	5	7	5	7		6	6	5	6	5	5	8	7	5	10	7	10	6	7	9	1	10	6	5
Contestants	Găgăuzia	162	6	9	9	5	9	5		10	6	8	5	6	8	8	4	5	10	5	8	9	6	1	3	10	7
Contestants	Ukraine	148	7	5	7	6	8	4	9		4	6	5	5	7	7	6	6	5	6	7	7	9	5	6	7	4
Contestants	Iran	178	7	9	9	6	10	6	7	10		9	8	6	9	7	4	6	7	7	8	8	7	9	7	6	6
Contestants	Kabardino-Balkaria and Karachay-Cherkessia	148	6	5	7	6	8	3	6	7	8		6	5	9	7	3	4	6	5	7	6	8	7	5	8	6
Contestants	Tatarstan	223	10	10	10	10	10	9	8	9	10	10		8	10	10	7	9	9	9	9	10	10	10	8	8	10
Contestants	Moscow	190	10	6	8	6	10	7	8	9	7	9	9		10	9	4	8	8	5	8	9	10	7	8	8	7
Contestants	Kyrgyzstan	190	10	7	8	8	9	8	7	8	6	10	7	7		9	7	9	10	8	7	8	9	5	5	10	8
Contestants	Yakutia	168	8	5	7	5	10	4	5	7	9	7	7	7	10		1	5	8	5	7	10	8	9	5	9	10
Contestants	Turkey	199	6	10	10	8	9	9	8	10	5	8	7	6	7	9		10	6	8	10	7	10	9	10	10	7
Contestants	Bosnia and Herzegovina	168	7	5	8	5	8	10	5	5	6	7	6	6	10	8	1		9	10	8	8	5	4	10	8	9
Contestants	Bashkortostan	193	10	6	10	5	9	9	8	7	8	8	10	8	9	9	1	6		10	9	9	10	7	6	10	9
Contestants	Bulgaria	168	6	10	8	5	9	10	7	6	3	6	9	6	9	8	1	10	10		7	8	2	8	9	6	5
Contestants	Iraq	155	7	6	9	5	7	4	6	9	6	7	5	7	8	8	3	4	6	6		7	7	7	6	7	8
Contestants	Crimea	178	8	7	7	6	9	6	9	7	5	8	10	7	9	9	3	5	10	6	7		9	5	9	9	8
Contestants	Azerbaijan	166	5	8	8	5	8	9	7	9	5	8	4	6	7	6	8	5	6	7	10	6		8	8	7	6
Contestants	Romania	158	5	10	9	4	7	2	7	8	4	6	8	6	7	7	4	5	8	10	6	7	5		10	6	7
Contestants	Macedonia	181	6	7	8	4	10	10	7	9	5	7	8	7	9	8	3	10	5	10	6	8	9	10		7	8
Contestants	Khakassia	148	7	5	7	4	7	5	8	6	7	6	5	6	10	7	3	5	9	5	6	8	6	5	4		7
Contestants	Tuva	154	7	8	8	6	10	2	6	7	9	7	5	7	6	10	3	5	8	8	9	4	3	5	4	8	

==== 10 points ====
Below is a summary of the maximum 10 points each country awarded to another in the semifinal:

N.	Contestant	Nation(s) giving 10 points
13	Tatarstan	Azerbaijan, Crimea, Germany, Georgia, Iran, Karachay-Cherkessia & Kabardino Balkaria, Kazakhstan, Kyrgyzstan, Romania, Turkmenistan, Tuva, Uzbekistan, Yakutia
10	Kazakhstan	Azerbaijan, Crimea, Georgia, Karachay-Cherkessia & Kabardino Balkaria, Khakassia, Kyrgyzstan, Turkmenistan, Tuva, Uzbekistan, Yakutia
8	Turkey	Azerbaijan, Bosnia and Herzegovina, Germany, Khakassia, Macedonia, Turkmenistan, Ukraine, Iraq
6	Bashkortostan	Azerbaijan, Bulgaria, Kazakhstan, Khakassia, Tatarstan, Turkmenistan
5	Macedonia	Albania, Bosnia and Herzegovina, Bulgaria, Romania, Uzbekistan
4	Bosnia and Herzegovina	Albania, Bulgaria, Kyrgyzstan, Macedonia
4	Bulgaria	Albania, Bashkortstan, Bosnia and Herzegovina, Germany
4	Kyrgyzstan	Bashkortostan, Kazakhstan, Khakassia, Karachay-Cherkessia & Kabardino Balkaria,
4	Moscow	Azerbaijan, Kazakhstan, Kyrgyzstan, Uzbekistan
4	Yakutia	Crimea, Kyrgyzstan, Tuva, Uzbekistan
3	Albania	Bosnia and Herzegovina, Bulgaria, Macedonia
3	Gagauzia	Bashkortostan, Khakassia, Ukraine
3	Romania	Bulgaria, Germany, Macedonia
2	Crimea	Bashkortostan, Tatarstan
2	Iran	Ukraine, Uzbekistan
2	Tuva	Uzbekistan, Yakutia
1	Azerbaijan	Iraq
1	Georgia	Azerbaijan
1	Germany	Bulgaria
1	Khakassia	Kyrgyzstan
1	Turkmenistan	Ukraine
1	Uzbekistan	Germany

=== Final ===
		Results																									
		Total score	Turkey	Crimea	Kazakhstan	Uzbekistan	Iran	Bashkortostan	Kyrgyzstan	Turkmenistan	Yakutia	Bulgaria	Azerbaijan	Bosnia and Herzegovina	Macedonia	Moscow	Tatarstan	Albania	Găgăuzia	Georgia	Germany	Iraq	Khakassia	Kabardino-Balkaria and Karachay-Cherkessia	Romania	Tuva	Ukraine
Contestants	Turkey	128		7	1	10	4	5	3	10	1	1	9	1	3	8	8	1	6	7	6	5	3	8	9	2	10
Contestants	Crimea	186	5		7	10	5	9	7	9	5	8	8	7	8	10	10	8	10	6	8	6	8	9	9	5	9
Contestants	Kazakhstan	225	10	10		10	6	10	10	10	10	9	10	10	6	10	10	9	10	10	9	7	10	10	9	10	10
Contestants	Uzbekistan	183	8	9	6		5	8	6	10	5	6	8	6	10	9	8	10	8	6	8	6	7	7	9	10	8
Contestants	Iran	167	5	7	2	10		7	5	8	1	6	8	5	5	8	9	9	8	10	8	9	5	9	9	6	8
Contestants	Bashkortostan	199	5	9	10	10	5		9	8	10	10	10	7	8	8	9	6	10	5	6	7	10	9	9	10	9
Contestants	Kyrgyzstan	196	7	8	10	10	6	8		9	10	6	10	10	9	9	8	7	7	7	7	7	10	9	9	6	7
Contestants	Turkmenistan	192	8	8	6	10	7	8	8		5	6	7	10	10	9	8	9	8	9	9	10	6	7	9	5	10
Contestants	Yakutia	183	4	9	10	10	8	9	10	7		5	6	5	8	8	7	5	7	8	7	6	9	8	9	10	8
Contestants	Bulgaria	172	5	8	3	10	3	9	6	8	2		6	10	10	8	8	10	7	7	9	8	5	8	10	2	9
Contestants	Azerbaijan	177	10	7	3	10	7	7	5	9	2	6		10	10	8	7	10	7	10	8	8	4	7	9	3	10
Contestants	Bosnia and Herzegovina	176	10	8	3	10	5	6	8	8	2	10	10		10	8	8	10	7	6	7	8	6	7	9	5	5
Contestants	Macedonia	166	6	7	2	10	4	5	4	8	1	9	6	10		9	8	10	8	6	9	8	4	8	10	7	7
Contestants	Moscow	170	5	9	5	10	7	8	5	9	3	7	8	5	8		9	5	9	6	6	5	7	9	9	6	10
Contestants	Tatarstan	201	10	10	4	10	8	9	7	10	5	8	9	5	8	9		9	9	9	9	9	6	9	10	9	10

==== 10 points ====
Below is a summary of the maximum 10 points each country awarded to another in the final:

N.	Contestant	Nation(s) giving 10 points
16	Kazakhstan	Azerbaijan, Bashkortostan, Bosnia and Herzegovina, Crimea, Gagauzia, Georgia, Karachay-Cherkessia & Kabardino Balkaria, Khakassia, Kyrgyzstan, Moscow, Tatarstan, Turkey, Turkmenistan, Tuva, Uzbekistan, Yakutia
8	Bashkortostan	Azerbaijan, Bulgaria, Gagauzia, Kazakhstan, Khakassia, Tuva, Uzbekistan, Yakutia
7	Azerbaijan	Albania, Bosnia and Herzegovina, Georgia, Macedonia, Turkey, Uzbekistan, Ukraine
6	Bosnia and Herzegovina	Albania, Azerbaijan, Bulgaria, Macedonia, Turkey, Uzbekistan
6	Kyrgyzstan	Azerbaijan, Bosnia and Herzegovina, Kazakhstan, Khakassia, Uzbekistan, Yakutia
6	Tatarstan	Crimea, Turkey, Romania, Turkmenistan, Uzbekistan
5	Bulgaria	Albania, Bosnia and Herzegovina, Macedonia, Romania, Uzbekistan
5	Turkmenistan	Bosnia and Herzegovina, Macedonia, Iraq, Ukraine, Uzbekistan
4	Macedonia	Albania, Bosnia and Herzegovina, Romania, Uzbekistan
4	Turkey	Gagauzia, Tatarstan, Moscow, Uzbekistan
4	Uzbekistan	Albania, Macedonia, Turkmenistan, Tuva
4	Yakutia	Kazakhstan, Kyrgyzstan, Tuva, Uzbekistan
3	Turkey	Turkmenistan, Ukraine, Uzbekistan
2	Iran	Georgia, Uzbekistan
2	Moscow	Ukraine, Uzbekistan

== Incidents ==
=== Funda Kılıç outfit ===
Following the semi-final, it was reported that Funda Kılıç had come under criticism from a number of delegations for performing in shorts. The head of delegation for Bashkortostan stated that it was outrageous for Kılıç to be wearing the shorts in front of 300 million viewers. Kılıç did however have the support of the contest organisers. In the final, Kılıç did not opt to wear the same outfit as in the semi-final.

== International broadcasts and voting ==
=== National jury members ===
Each participating country was represented by one jury member. Confirmed as being on the jury were:

- Albania – Avni Qahili
- Azerbaijan – Eldar Gasimov
- Bashkortostan – Aigul Akhmadeeva
- Bosnia and Herzegovina – Ahmed Švrakić
- Crimea – Seyran Mambetov
- Georgia – Afik Novruzov
- Germany – Volkan Gucer
- Iran – Javat Abrahem
- Iraq – Fethullah Ahmed Salih
- Karachay-Cherkessia – Nadezhda Hadzhieva
- Kazakhstan – Bolat Mazhagulov
- Kyrgyzstan – Gulnur Satylganova
- Macedonia – Eran Hasip
- Moscow – Arman Davletyarov
- Tatarstan – Dina Garipova
- Turkey – Sinan Akçıl
- Turkmenistan – Atageldi Garyagdyyew
- Uzbekistan – Mansur Tashmatov
- Yakutia – Vladimir Indigirsky

=== Commentators ===
Each participating broadcaster is expected to show the contest live enabling the public to vote in the contest. The broadcasters that have been confirmed so far are:

- Azerbaijan – ATV Azerbaijan
- Bashkortostan – Kurai Television
- Bosnia and Herzegovina – Hayat TV
- Crimea – Crimea Public Radio and Television
- Gagauzia – GRT Television
- Georgia – Marmueli Television
- Germany – Türkshow
- Iran – IRIB
- Iraq – Turkmenli Television
- Kazakhstan – Timur Serzhanov and Arman Duisenov (Adam Media Group)
- Karachay-Cherkessia – Arhiz 24
- Khakassia – RTV
- Kyrgyzstan – KTRK
- Macedonia – MRT 2
- Northern Cyprus – Kibris Genc Television (non-participating)
- Omsk Oblast – GTRK Omsk (non-participating)
- Romania – Alpha Media TV
- Russia – TMB Russia – Your World East (non-participating)
- Tatarstan – Maydan Television
- Turkey – TMB TV
- Ukraine – ODTRK Odesa

== Other regions ==
- Northern Cyprus – The region of Northern Cyprus had initially selected İpek Amber to represent them with the song "Sessiz gidiş" (Silent leaving). But it was later announced that it was highly likely they would have to withdraw due to political technicalities. The singer was to enter Tatarstan using a Northern Cypriot passport. However, due to the Cyprus dispute, the International recognition of Northern Cyprus as a self-declared state is not recognised by Russia, thus denying entry into Tatarstan, a federal subject of Russia.
