= Turkvision Song Contest 2015 =

3rd Turkvision Song Contest

- Türkvizyon Istanbul 2015

Date and venue
- Final: 19 December 2015
- Venue: Yahya Kemal Beyatli Cultural Centre, Istanbul, Turkey

Organisation
- Host broadcaster: Turkish Music Box Television (TMB)
- Presenters: Vatan Sasmaz; Oylum Talu

Participants
- Number of entries: 21
- Debuting countries: Serbia; Syria
- Returning countries: Belarus; Kosovo; Northern Cyprus
- Non-returning countries: Bashkortostan; Crimea; / Kabardino-Balkaria & Karachay-Cherkessia; Khakassia; Moscow; Tatarstan; Turkmenistan; Tuva; Yakutia
- Participation map: Participating countries Countries that participated in the past but not in 2015

Vote
- Voting system: A juror from each region evaluates all the songs on a 10 point system.
- Winning song: Kyrgyzstan; "Kim Bilet"

The Turkvision Song Contest 2015 (Turkish: Türkvizyon Şarkı Yarışması 2015) was the third edition of the Turkvision Song Contest, which took place in Istanbul, Turkey; and organised by Turkish Music Box Television (TMB). A total of twenty-one Turkic regions, which have either a large Turkic population or a widely spoken Turkic language, participated in the contest, as well as one Turkic ethnic groups who do not have a defined region. Several regions of the Russian Federation were on the preliminary participation list for the contest, but were later forced to withdraw due to the Ministry of Culture banning Russian regions from the TURKSOY organisation. There was no semi-final this year, whilst the final took place on 19 December 2015.

== Location ==
On 22 November 2014, it was announced that the hosts for Turkvision 2015 would have been Turkmenistan. Mary, the capital city of Mary Province in Turkmenistan, had been previously chosen as the host city. However, on 21 February 2015 it was announced that the host city had been changed and the contest would then take place in Ashgabat. In late August 2015, the host city was changed yet again to Istanbul, Turkey.

The contest was held in the Yahya Kemal Beyatli Cultural Centre, in Istanbul, Turkey. The centre has 10,000 covered seats of 30,000 seats at total in Küçükçekmece district of Istanbul.

== Format ==
=== National host broadcaster ===
Unlike the previous two editions, there was no semi-final held for the 2015 edition. The final took place on 19 December 2015, and was organised by the host broadcaster Turkish Music Box Television (TMB).

=== National jury members ===
Each participating country is represented by one jury member, confirmed as being on the jury were:

- Albania – Avni Qahili
- Azerbaijan – Isa Melikov
- Belarus – Gunesh Abasova
- Bosnia and Herzegovina – Ahmed Švrakić
- Bulgaria – Erhan Hüseyin
- Gagauzia – Piotr Petkovic
- Germany – Volkan Gucer
- Georgia – Afik Novruzov
- Iran – Mesut Barış
- Iraq – Yalman Hacarov
- Kazakhstan – Bolat Mazhagulov
- Kyrgyzstan – Kanatbek Kultaev
- Kosovo – Reşit İsmet Krüezi
- Macedonia – Sedat Azizoglu
- Northern Cyprus – Ertan Birinci
- Romania – Nejat Sali
- Serbia – Denis Mavrić
- Syria – Ömer Gürcan
- Turkey – Cengiz Erdem
- Ukraine – Madejda Malenkova
- Uzbekistan – Çokay Koçar

== Participants ==
Twenty-one Turkic regions, which have either a large Turkic population or a widely spoken Turkic language, participated in the contest which took place on 19 December 2015. Below are the details of each of the participants.

Draw	Region	Artist	Song	Language	Points	Place
1	Germany	Derya Kaptan	"Sessiz Çiğlik"	Turkish	153	11
2	Albania	Xhoi Bejko & Visar Rexhepi	"Adi Hasret"	Turkish	154	8
3	Azerbaijan	Mehman Tağıyev	"İstanbul"	Azerbaijani	155	7
4	Belarus	Aleksandra Kazimova	"Azadliq"	Azerbaijani	126	20
5	Bosnia and Herzegovina	Adis Škaljo	"Pa šta"	Bosnian	153	12
6	Bulgaria	Big Star Life	"İstanbuldayiz"	Turkish	162	6
7	Georgia	Anar Askerov	"Tenha Yürek"	Azerbaijani	138	16
8	Iraq	Oğuz Sirmali	"Serenat"	Turkish	137	17
9	Iran	Reza Esbilani	"Menim Arzum"	Azerbaijani	131	19
10	Kazakhstan	Orda	"Olaı emes" (Олай емес)	Kazakh	185	2
11	Kyrgyzstan	Jiidesh İdirisova	"Kim bilet" (Ким билет)	Kyrgyz	194	1
12	Kosovo	Tolga Kazaz	"Sevmek Günah Midir?"	Turkish	141	14
13	Northern Cyprus	İpek Amber	"Sessiz Gidiş"	Turkish	154	9
14	Macedonia	Kaan Mazhar	"Böyle Olmamaliydi"	Turkish	165	4
15	Gagauzia	Valentin Ormanji	"Sev Beni Sev"	Turkish	154	10
16	Uzbekistan	KaaPlya (Ajnabiy) and Hurdona	"Azadlik"	Uzbek	119	21
17	Romania	Edvin Eddy	"Seviyorum Anlasana"	Turkish	134	18
18	Serbia	Almedin Varošanin	"Trag" (Траг)	Serbian, Bosnian	140	15
19	Syria	Adil Şan	"Geliş"	Turkish	165	5
20	Turkey	Görkem Durmaz	"Hirçin Sular"	Turkish	175	3
21	Ukraine	Anna Mitioglo	"Baaşla bana"	Gagauz	148	13

== Other awards ==
In addition to the contest winner, there were also three other awards presented during the show. These were as follows:

Category	Country	Performer(s)	Song
Peace Prize	Iraq	Oğuz Sirmali	"Serenat"
Friendly Prize	Syria	Adil Şan	"Geliş"
Special Jury Award	Germany	Derya Kaptan	"Sessiz Çiğlik"

== Broadcasters ==
Each of the participating broadcasters is expected to broadcast the contest live. The broadcasters that are confirmed so far are:

- Albania – Tring TV
- Azerbaijan – ATV Azerbaijan
- Bosnia & Herzegovina – Hayat TV – 19 December at 20:00 CET
- Gagauzia – GRT Television
- Georgia – Marnueli Television
- Germany – Türk Show
- Iraq – Türkmeneli TV
- Kazakhstan – Khabar TV – 19 December at 21:00 (17:00 CET)
- Kyrgyzstan – KTRK
- Macedonia – MRT 2
- Northern Cyprus – Kibris Genc Television
- Romania – Alpha Media TV
- Serbia – RTV Novi Pazar
- Turkey – TMB TV, ATV, Ordu Boztepe TV, Kral TV
- Ukraine – ODTRK Odesa, Yuzhnaya Volna TV

== Other regions ==
The following list of regions participated in the past but did not compete in 2015:

- Altai Republic – On 28 November it was announced that Altai Republic would withdraw from the contest due to the current state of international relations between the Russian Federation and Turkey.
- Bashkortostan – On 30 November it was announced that Bashkortostan would withdraw from the contest due to the current state of international relations between the Russian Federation and Turkey. Despite this Bashkortostan did select Ziliya Bachtieva to represent them in 2015.
- Crimea – On 30 November it was announced that Crimea would withdraw from the contest due to the current state of international relations between the Russian Federation and Turkey. Despite this Crimea did select Safiye Denishaeva with the song "Aqın Dostlar" to represent them in 2015.
- Kabardino-Balkaria & Karachay-Cherkessia – On 30 November it was announced that Kabardino-Balkaria & Karachay-Cherkessia would withdraw from the contest due to the current state of international relations between the Russian Federation and Turkey. Despite this Kabardino-Balkaria & Karachay-Cherkessia did select Islam Appayev with the song "Unutma meni" (Karachay-Balkar: Унутма мени) to represent them in 2015.
- Khakassia – On 30 November it was announced that Khakassia would withdraw from the contest due to the current state of international relations between the Russian Federation and Turkey. Despite this Khakassia did select Sayana Saburova & Olga Vasilyeva to represent them in 2015.
- Kumyks – On 17 December it was announced that Kumyks would not debut at the contest due to the current state of international relations between the Russian Federation and Turkey. Despite this Kumyks did select Gulmira, Fatima and Kamilya with the song "Alğa!" to represent them in 2015.
- Moscow – On 30 November it was announced that Moscow would withdraw from the contest due to the current state of international relations between the Russian Federation and Turkey. Despite this Moscow did select Zuleyha İlbakova with the song "Belekey qiź" to represent them in 2015.
- Stavropol Krai – On 3 December it was announced that Stavropol Krai would not debut at the contest due to the current state of international relations between the Russian Federation and Turkey. Despite this Stavropol Krai did select İslam Satırov with the song "Tuvgan erym" (Nogai: Тувган ерым (Native land)) to represent them in 2015.
- Tatarstan – In December 2015, it was announced that Tatarstan would withdraw from the contest due to the state of international relations between the Russian Federation and Turkey. Tatarstan had selected the song "Siña kaytam", performed by Yamle, to represent them in 2015.
- Tuva – On 30 November it was announced that Tuva would withdraw from the contest due to the current state of international relations between the Russian Federation and Turkey. Despite this Tuva did select Arjaana Stal-ool with the song "Tuvam" (Tuvan: Тывам) to represent them in 2015.
- Yakutia – On 1 December it was announced that Yakutia would withdraw from the contest due to the current state of international relations between the Russian Federation and Turkey. Despite this Yakutia did select Dalaana to represent them in 2015.

Whilst these countries were rumored to debut, but did not enter:

- Hungary – Hungary sent a delegation to the Capital of Culture's opening ceremony in Merv, Turkmenistan. However, none of the Hungarian broadcasters have made any official announcement regarding their début.
- Kalmykia – The Republic of Kalmykia also sent a delegation to Merv, Turkmenistan; hosts of the Capital of Culture's opening ceremony. However, GTRK Kalmykia, the broadcaster of Kalmykia, has not made any official announcement regarding their début.

== See also ==
- Bala Turkvision Song Contest 2015
- Eurovision Song Contest 2015
- Junior Eurovision Song Contest 2015
- Eurovision Young Dancers 2015
- ABU TV Song Festival 2015
- ABU Radio Song Festival 2015
