= Güçer =

Güçer, Gücer is a Turkish surname. Notable people with the surname include:

- Hürriyet Güçer (born 1981), Turkish footballer
- Volkan Gucer, Turkish composer, producer, and musician
- Yusuf Behçet Gücer (1890–1952), Turkish politician
