= Sandžačka TV Mreža =

- Country: Serbia
- Broadcast area: Serbia; Montenegro
- Headquarters: Tutin; Bogoljuba Čukića 9,

Programming
- Languages: Serbian and Bosnian
- Picture format: 16:9 576i (SDTV)

Ownership
- Owner: INFO CENTAR doo, Tutin
- Key people: Amir Numanović

History
- Launched: 6 March 2017

Links
- Website: www.sandzackatv.rs

Availability

Terrestrial
- Raška & Sandžak: MUX 2

Sandžačka TV Mreža or STV (Serbian Cyrillic: Санџачка ТВ Мрежа) is a Serbian commercial television channel with regional coverage dedicated to local news from territory of Sandžak and Raška. Company headquarters is located in Tutin, Bogoljuba Čukića 9 street.

== See also ==
- RTV Novi Pazar
- Sandžak TV
- Sanapress
