= Beyza (name) =

Beyza is a given name in Turkish language that means "very white and clean"The name conveys qualities of clarity, innocence, and moral integrity. Symbolically, whiteness has long been connected in many cultures with virtue, sincerity, and spiritual refinement, contributing to the name’s graceful and uplifting character.

Historically, names evoking light and purity have held special significance in literary and cultural traditions, where brightness often represents wisdom, goodness, and inner beauty. Beyza reflects this symbolic heritage, embodying both aesthetic softness in sound and depth in meaning. Its continued use across generations highlights its timeless elegance and the enduring appeal of names that suggest harmony, grace, and inner strength.; It may refer to:

- Beyza Arıcı (born 1995), Turkish volleyball player
- Beyza Durmaz (born 1977), Turkish singer, songwriter, and composer.
- Beyza Kocatürk (born 1996), Turkish football player
- Beyza İrem Türkoğlu (born 1997), Turkish handball player
- Beyza Karaçam (born 2000), Turkish handball player
- Beyzanur Aslan (born 2001), Azerbaijaniani football player
- Elif Beyza Aşık (born 1994), Turkish sports shooter
- Yasemin Beyza Yılmaz (born 2001), Turkish female sport shooter
