= Sakhaya =

Russian singer

- Also known as: Vladlena Ivanova
- Born: Vladlena Pavlovna Nogovitsyna; 27 January; Kobyaysky District
- Genres: Folk; pop; folk-pop; rock
- Occupations: Singer; actress; presenter
- Years active: 1994–present

Vladlena Pavlovna Burnasheva (Russian: Владлена Павловна Бурвна; born Nogovitsyna, formerly Ivanova), known professionally as Sakhaya (Russian: Сахая, Yakut: Сахаая), is a Russian singer, actress and presenter from the Kobyaysky District of Sakha. She is internationally best known for having represented Sakha in the Turkvision Song Contest in 2014. She is considered one of the most successful singers from the republic.

== Biography ==
Sakhaya began her musical career after meeting producer Nikolay Donsky in 1994, and the following year, she released the album Ty Moj Paren. In 2001, she won the Grand Prix in the song contest Stoj, Molodaja Pora and later she has won the nomination "Best Singer of the Year" in Sakha's most prestigious music award, Etigen Khomus, presented by the Victoria Sakha Radio Channel five times. In 2003, Sakhaya won the Velaja Luna Competition in Buryatia. For her work, she was named a People's Artist of the Sakha Republic in 2007.

In 2014, Sakhaya came in seventh place when she performed the song "Kyn" in the Turkvision Song Contest in Kazan.

Sakhaya was first married to singer Alexander Burnashev, before marrying lawyer Mark Ivanov in 2013. In 2015, she remarried Burnashev. Together they have two children.

== Discography ==
=== Singles ===
- Kyn (2014)
