= Muzaferija =

Muzaferija is a Bosnian surname. Notable people with the surname include:

- Armin Muzaferija (born 1988), Bosnian singer
- Elvedina Muzaferija (born 1999), Bosnian alpine skier
- Zaim Muzaferija (1923–2003), Bosnian film, television and stage actor
