= Sandžak TV =

Serbian television channel

- Country: Serbia
- Broadcast area: Serbia; Bosnia and Herzegovina; Montenegro; Worldwide
- Headquarters: Novi Pazar, Dimitrija Tucovića bb

Programming
- Language(s): Serbian language, Bosnian language
- Picture format: 16:9 576i (SDTV)

Ownership
- Owner: SANDŽAK TELEVIZIJA doo, Novi Pazar
- Key people: Salahudin Fetić, CEO

History
- Launched: 29 December 1998
- Former names: Ekran TV (1999-2008); Universa (2008-2011)

Links
- Website: www.sandzak.tv

Availability

Terrestrial
- Raška & Sandžak: MUX 2

Sandžak TV or Sandžačka Televizija (Serbian Cyrillic: Санџак ТВ) is a Serbian commercial television channel with regional coverage dedicated to local news from the territory of Sandžak and Raška. The company's headquarters is located in Novi Pazar, Dimitrija Tucovića bb street.

== History ==
Sandžak TV was founded as Ekran TV on 29 December 1998 as the first television channel in Novi Pazar.

After 16 June 2008, television changed its name into the Universa and new owner was International University of Novi Pazar. The main idea of university television was to be a training bastion for journalists who study at the Department of Journalism at IUNP.

On 11 May 2011, the television channel changed its name to the current name, Sandžak Televizija. Along with the television channel, local news agency Sanapress (Sandžak news agency), Refref radio and the newspapers Glas islama and Revija Sandžak are local media in Novi Pazar.

== Current line-up ==
- Tema dana - daily news programme
- Pretres - weekly political talk show dedicated to events in Sandžak, Serbia, Bosnia and Herzegovina and Montenegro
- Hajrat - TV show devoted to local charity actions and humanitarian work
- Dječije radosti - kids' programme
- Naši mališani - kids' programme
- Vremeplov - review of important historical events
- Magazin - talk show
- Iz Svijeta sporta - weekly sports magazine
- Knjiga je moj najbolji prijatelj - TV show dedicated to literature and art

== See also ==
- RTV Novi Pazar
- Sandžačka TV Mreža
