= Zhanar Dugalova =

Kazakh singer

Zhanar Dugalova Жанар Дұғалова
- Born: 18 January 1987 (age 39); Kyzylorda, Kazakh SSR, USSR
- Genres: World; electronic; folk; pop
- Occupation: Singer
- Years active: 2012–present

Zhanar Dugalova (Kazakh: Жанар Дұғалова, Janar Dūğalova; born 18 January 1987) is a Kazakh singer who won the Turkvision Song Contest 2014 representing Kazakhstan with the song "Izin kórem". She is also a former member of Kazakhstani pop group KeshYou. Since August 2014 she has continued her career independently.

== Biography ==
Dugalova was born in Kyzylorda, southern Kazakhstan, before moving with her family to Almaty. Years before her debut in the music industry, she took part in the contest Zhas Kanat, a national music festival which aimed to launch the careers of amateur and new singers. After her performance in the festival, well-known producer Bayan Esentayeva became interested in her voice. She was hailed for her powerful voice and her beauty. In late 2012, she released her first single "Súıemin deshi" (Kazakh: Сүйемін деші), which was used as a song in the soundtrack of the movie "Ǵashyq júrek" (Kazakh: Ғашық жүрек, A cocktail with stars) where she also had a role. The popularity of the film and the success of the song turned the young singer into a celebrity.

=== With KeshYou ===
In 2013, she was included in the new lineup of KeshYou, a well-known band in Kazakhstan, which is also known for its almost constant lineup changes. Her first single with KeshYou was the song "Asıqpa", which was a smash hit in Kazakhstan, topping the airplay charts for months.

Zhanar became more popular than Aidana Medenova and Kamshat Joldibayeva, the other two vocalists of KeshYou. Thanks to the enormous promotional effort by Bayan Esentayeva, the popularity of the band increased, producing many more hit singles including "Qazaq qyzdary" (Kazakh: Қазақ қыздары, Kazakh girls). The band also participated in Kazakhstan's national final for the Turkvision Song Contest 2013 with the song "Rizamyn" (Kazakh: Ризамын), which placed fourth, and became another hit. During this part of her music career, Zhanar Dugalova combined her KeshYou trajectory with solo songs.

=== Solo ===
Dugalova left KeshYou in 2014. She released more solo songs with the collaboration of her producer Bayan Esentayeva, increasing her popularity. Dugalova won the Kazakhstani national final for the Turkvision Song Contest 2014 with the song "Izin kórem" (Kazakh: Ізін көрем), and went on to represent Kazakhstan in the contest in Kazan, Tatarstan, Russia. She qualified from the semi-final on 19 November 2014 and won the contest on 21 November 2014 with 225 points.

Having become a national heroine, Dugalova released more songs and took part in many national events. In 2015, the singer met then-President of Kazakhstan Nursultan Nazarbayev, who invited her to a convention of Kazakhstani women in which other successful Kazakhstani personalities, such as female volleyball player Sabina Altynbekova, took part.

In April 2017, Dugalova expressed interest in representing Kazakhstan in the Eurovision Song Contest. As of 2026, Kazakhstan has never participated in the contest.

== Singles ==
=== With KeshYou ===
- Asyqpa (Acықпa) (2013)
- Qazaq qyzdary (Қaзaқ қыздapы) (2013)
- Týǵan jer (Tyғaн жep) (2013)
- Rızamyn (Ризамын) (2013)
- Mahabbat (Maxaббaт) (2014)

=== Solo ===
- Tańdanba (Taңдaнбa) (2011)
- Súıemin deshi (Сүйемін деші) (2012)
- Sen emes (Ceн eмec) (2012)
- Kim úshin (Kiм үшiн) (2013)
- Bir sýraq (Біp cypaқ) (2013)
- Ýaıymdama (Уaйымдaмa) (2013)
- Izin kórem (Iзiн көpeм) (2014)
- Sen meni túsinbedin (Ceн мeнi түciнбeдін), With Kairat Nurtas (2014)
- Aıta bersin (Aйтa бepcін), with Ninety One on Gakku Áýenderi 2016 (Kazakh: Gakku Әуендері)
- Ala ketpediń (Ала кетпедің) (2017)

Preceded by Farid Hasanov with "Yaşa"	Winner of the Turkvision Song Contest; 2014	Succeeded by Jiidesh İdirisova with "Kim bilet"
Preceded by Rin'go with "Birlikpen alǵa"	Kazakhstan in the Turkvision Song Contest; 2014	Succeeded by Orda with "Olaı emes"
