= Azerbaijanis in Belarus =

Azerbaijanis in Belarus Belarus azərbaycanlıları
Total population
- 5,567 (Census 2009) and 7.000 (Estimate)

Regions with significant populations
- Minsk

Languages
- Azerbaijani, Belarusian and Russian

Religion
- Predominantly Muslim

Azerbaijanis in Belarus (Azerbaijani: Belarus azərbaycanlıları, Belarusian: Азербайджанцы ў Беларусі/Azěrbajdžancy w Bělarusi) are a small Azerbaijani diaspora in Belarus, and are Belarusian citizens and permanent residents of ethnic Azerbaijani background. Azerbaijan and Belarus both used to be the part of the Russian Empire and then the Soviet Union. Currently there are over 5,567 (0.1%) Azerbaijanis in Belarus.

== Demographics ==
Population of Azerbaijanis in Belarus according to ethnic group 1959-2009
Ethnic group	census 1959^{1}		census 1970^{2}		census 1979^{3}		census 1989^{4}		census 1999^{5}		census 2009^{6}	
Ethnic group	1,402	0.0	1,335	0.0	2,654	0.0	5,009	0.1	6,300	0.1	5,567	0.1
^{1} Source: . ^{2} Source: . ^{3} Source: . ^{4} Source: . ^{5} Source: . ^{6} Source: .

== Notable people ==
- Gunesh Abasova, Belarusian singer
- Chingiz Allazov, Azerbaijani kickboxer
- Natik Bagirov, Belarusian judoka
- Leila Ismailava, Belarusian journalist leading music TV programs; model
- Kamandar Madzhidov, Belarusian wrestler, 1988 Olympic gold medal winner
- Rashad Mammadov, Belarusian judoka
- Zabit Samedov, Azerbaijani kickboxer

== See also ==
- Azerbaijan–Belarus relations
- Azerbaijani diaspora
- Demographics of Belarus
