= Turkvision Song Contest =

Turkic-language recurring song contest

- Also known as: Türkvizyon Song Contest
- Genre: Song contest
- Created by: TÜRKSOY; TMB TV
- Original languages: Turkish & official language(s) of host country
- No. of episodes: 4 contests

Production
- Running time: 2 hours, 45 minutes (semi-final); 2 hours, 30 minutes (final)
- Production company: TMB TV

Original release
- Release: 19 December 2013 – 20 December 2020

Related
- Eurovision Song Contest; Intervision Song Contest

The Turkvision Song Contest (TSC, Turkish: Türkvizyon Şarkı Yarışması), also known as the Türkvizyon Song Contest, is a song competition created by Turkish music channel TMB TV, inspired by the format of the Eurovision Song Contest. The first edition took place in Eskişehir, Turkey in December 2013. Countries and regions which are Turkic-speaking and of Turkic ethnicity are eligible to participate. The contest was last held on 20 December 2020 as an online event hosted from Istanbul, Turkey. Several cancellations followed, and the future of the event remains uncertain.

== History ==
According to an October 2013 statement on the official website Turkvision.info: "Turkvision is a new contest inspired of Eurovision song contest. While Eurovision focuses in European countries, Turkvision is a contest whose participants are mainly from Turkish countries or Turkish spoken countries." Turkvision was actually a song contest which was created by TÜRKSOY in cooperation with the Turkish music channel TMB TV. The participating countries and regions had to take part in the Semi Final. A juror from each nation awarded between 1 and 10 points for every entry, except their own. An amount of 12 to 15 nations qualified for the Grand Final where the jury determined the winner. TÜRKSOY stated that televoting would be introduced in the future, but this never took place.

Hosting of the Turkvision Song Contest took place in the country or region that also hosted the Turkic Capital of Culture instead of the previous year's winning country.

In November 2020, the official Turkvision website posted that they hoped to stage the 2021 edition in Shusha, Azerbaijan. This was confirmed in December 2020 by İslam Bağırov, the contest's general coordinator, though it was later revealed that the 2021 edition would be taking place in Turkistan, Kazakhstan. However, the 2021 contest did not materialize.

On 1 February 2022, the Uzbekistan Tourism Ambassador announced on Twitter that the 2022 contest would take place in the first week of June 2022 in Fergana, Uzbekistan. However, this did not materialize and TÜRKSOY stated that the contest will be moved to Bursa, Turkey and take place later in the year, but that didn't materialize either.

On 19 April 2024, Gunesh Abasova, Chairperson of the Turkvision 2020 jury and heavily involved in the contest since her participation in 2013, stated on social media that the contest is set to return in 2024. As part of a song release, she said that its music video would be premiered "at the large-scale competition Turkvision 2024".

== Participation ==
Participation since 2013: Entered at least once Entered at least once, but only in a combined entry Never entered, although eligible to do so Entry intended but later withdrew

Participants from Turkic-speaking and Turkic countries or regions were eligible to compete in the annual Turkvision Song Contests, such as Crimea, Karachay-Cherkessia, and Turkey.

Twenty-four countries and regions took part in the first edition of Turkvision. There were several unsuccessful attempts to participate in the Turkvision Song Contest. Chuvashia, Russia, Turkmenistan, and Xinjiang were one of the original twenty-four participating areas with initial intentions to competing at the 2013 Contest, but later withdrew for undisclosed reasons.

Russia's Omsk Oblast broadcast the 2014 contest, but they have never made any statement regarding participation. A delegation from another Russian federal subject, Kalmykia, attended the 2015 contest, but did not participate and have not made any subsequent statements regarding participation.

Table key

Inactive – Countries or regions which have participated in the past, but did not participate in the most recent contest or will not participate in the upcoming contest.

Country or region	Debut year	Latest entry	Entries	Wins	Broadcaster(s)
Albania	2014	2020	3	0	Radio Televizioni Shqiptar
Altai Republic	2013	2013	1	0	STRC Altai Mountains
Azerbaijan	2013	2020	4	1	ATV Azerbaijan
Bashkortostan	2013	2020	3	0	STRC Bashkortostan
Belarus	2013	2020	3	0	Belarusian Television and Radio Company
Bosnia and Herzegovina	2013	2020	4	0	Hayat TV
Bulgaria	2014	2015	2	0	Alfa Media^{[a]}
Crimea	2013	2014	2	0	Crimea Public Radio and Television
Gagauzia	2013	2020	4	0	Gagauziya Radio Televizionu
Georgia	2013	2015	3	0	Kvemio Kartlia Television (2013); Marneuli Television (2014-2015)
Germany	2014	2020	3	0	Türkshow Televizyonu
Iran	2014	2015	2	0	Islamic Republic of Iran Broadcasting
Iraq	2013	2015	3	0	Türkmeneli TV
Iraqi Turkmens	2020	2020	1	0	Türkmeneli TV
Kabardino-Balkaria^{[d]}	2013	2014	2	0	GTRK Kabardino-Balkaria TV
Karachay-Cherkessia^{[d]}	2013	2014	2	0	Arkhyz 24
Kazakhstan	2013	2020	4	1	Adam Media Group
Kazakh Uyghurs	2020	2020	1	0	N/A
Kemerovo	2013	2013	1	0	VGTRK
Khakassia	2013	2020	3	0	VGTRK
Kosovo	2013	2015	2	0	RTK Television
Kyrgyzstan	2013	2020	4	1	Piramida Television
Moldova	2020	2020	1	0	KTRK
Moscow	2014	2020	2	0	VGTRK
Nogais	2020	2020	1	0	Union of Nogai Youth
North Macedonia	2013	2020	4	0	MRT 2
Northern Cyprus	2013	2020	3	0	GENC Television
Poland	2020	2020	1	0	N/A
Romania	2013	2020	4	0	Alpha TV Media
Serbia	2015	2020	2	0	RTV Novi Pazar
Syria	2015	2015	1	0	ORTAS
Tatarstan	2013	2020	3	0	Maydan Television
Turkey	2013	2020	4	0	Kral TV
Turkmenistan	2014	2014	1	0	Altyn Asyr
Tuva	2013	2020	3	0	VGTRK
Tyumen Oblast	2020	2020	1	0	VGTRK
Ukraine	2013	2020	4	1	Kultura
Uzbekistan	2013	2015	3	0	MTRK
Yakutia	2013	2020	3	0	VGTRK

=== Other countries ===
The following countries and regions had confirmed participation at previous editions of the contest, but either withdrew prior to their debut or the contest was cancelled before they could:

- Austria.
- Belgium.
- Chuvashia.
- Dagestan. On 1 July 2016, it was confirmed that Dagestan would make their official Turkvision Song Contest début at the 2016 contest to be held in Turkey, however the contest was eventually canceled.
- Greece.
- Hungary.
- Kumyk.^{[c]} On 23 September 2015 it was confirmed that the Kumyks would make their official début at the 2015 contest to be held in Istanbul, Turkey. However, on 17 December it was announced that Kumyk would not debut at the contest due to the current state of international relations between the Russian Federation and Turkey. Despite this Kumyk did select Gulmira, Fatima and Kamilya with the song "Alğa!" to represent them in 2015. The Kumyks had selected Daniyal Harunow as their artist in 2016 before the contest's cancellation.
- Latvia. On 29 October 2016, it was announced that Latvia would be making their Turkvision debut at the 2016 edition, and had internally selected Oksana Bilera with the song "Yakışıyor bize bu sevgi". However, it was later confirmed that both of the 2016 contests had been cancelled due to the December 2016 Istanbul bombings.
- Netherlands. In October 2016, it was announced that the Netherlands would debut at the 2016 contest in Turkey, when the song "Ana – Vətən", performed by Elcan Rzayev, was announced as the country's entry. However, the 2016 contest was later cancelled. The Netherlands' participation in the 2020 contest was provisionally confirmed in November 2020, when "Ana – Vətən", performed by Elcan Rzayev, was again revealed as the Netherlands' entry for the contest. However, in December 2020, Rzayev withdrew from the contest due to COVID-19 restrictions in the Netherlands, leaving the country's participation in the contest in doubt.
- Russia
- Stavropol Krai.^{[c]} On 23 September 2015 it was confirmed that Nogais would make their official Turkvision Song Contest début at the 2015 contest to be held in Istanbul, Turkey. But later on 23 November it was announced that they will be represented as Stavropol Krai. However, the contest was eventually canceled.
- Sweden. On 25 October 2016, it was announced that Sweden will debut at the 2016 contest in Turkey. The same day it was announced that Arghavan with the song "Dirçəliş" will fly the Swedish to Turkey. After initially opting to send their 2016 entry to the 2020 contest, the country eventually withdrew citing an inability to record a performance acceptable for the competition.
- Tajikistan.
- Xinjiang. Xinjiang was to make their debut at the inaugural 2013 festival, in Eskişehir, Turkey, however it later opted to not partake.

== Winners ==
=== By year ===
Year	Date	Host city	Participants	Winner	Draw	Song	Performer	Points	Margin	Runner-up
2013	21 December	Eskişehir	24	Azerbaijan	9	"Yaşa"	Farid Hasanov	210	5	Belarus
2014	21 November	Kazan	25	Kazakhstan	3	"Izin kórem" (Ізін көрем)	Zhanar Dugalova	225	24	Tatarstan
2015	19 December	Istanbul	21	Kyrgyzstan	11	"Kim bilet" (Ким билет)	Jiidesh İdirisova	194	9	Kazakhstan
2020	20 December	Istanbul	26	Ukraine	15	"Tikenli yol"	Natalie Papazoglu	226	22	Yakutia

=== By country/region ===
Map showing winners since 2013.

The table below shows the top-three placings from each contest, along with the years that a country won the contest.

Country	1st place, gold medalist(s)	2nd place, silver medalist(s)	3rd place, bronze medalist(s)	Total	Years won
Kazakhstan	1	1	0	2	2014
Ukraine	1	0	1	2	2020
Azerbaijan	1	0	0	1	2013
Kyrgyzstan	1	0	0	1	2015
Belarus	0	1	0	1	—N/a
Tatarstan	0	1	0	1	—N/a
Yakutia	0	1	0	1	—N/a
Bashkortostan	0	0	1	1	—N/a
Bosnia and Herzegovina	0	0	1	1	—N/a
Turkey	0	0	1	1	—N/a

=== By language ===
Wins	Language	Years	Country
1	Azerbaijani	2013	Azerbaijan
1	Gagauz	2020	Ukraine
1	Kazakh	2014	Kazakhstan
1	Kyrgyz	2015	Kyrgyzstan

== Hosting ==
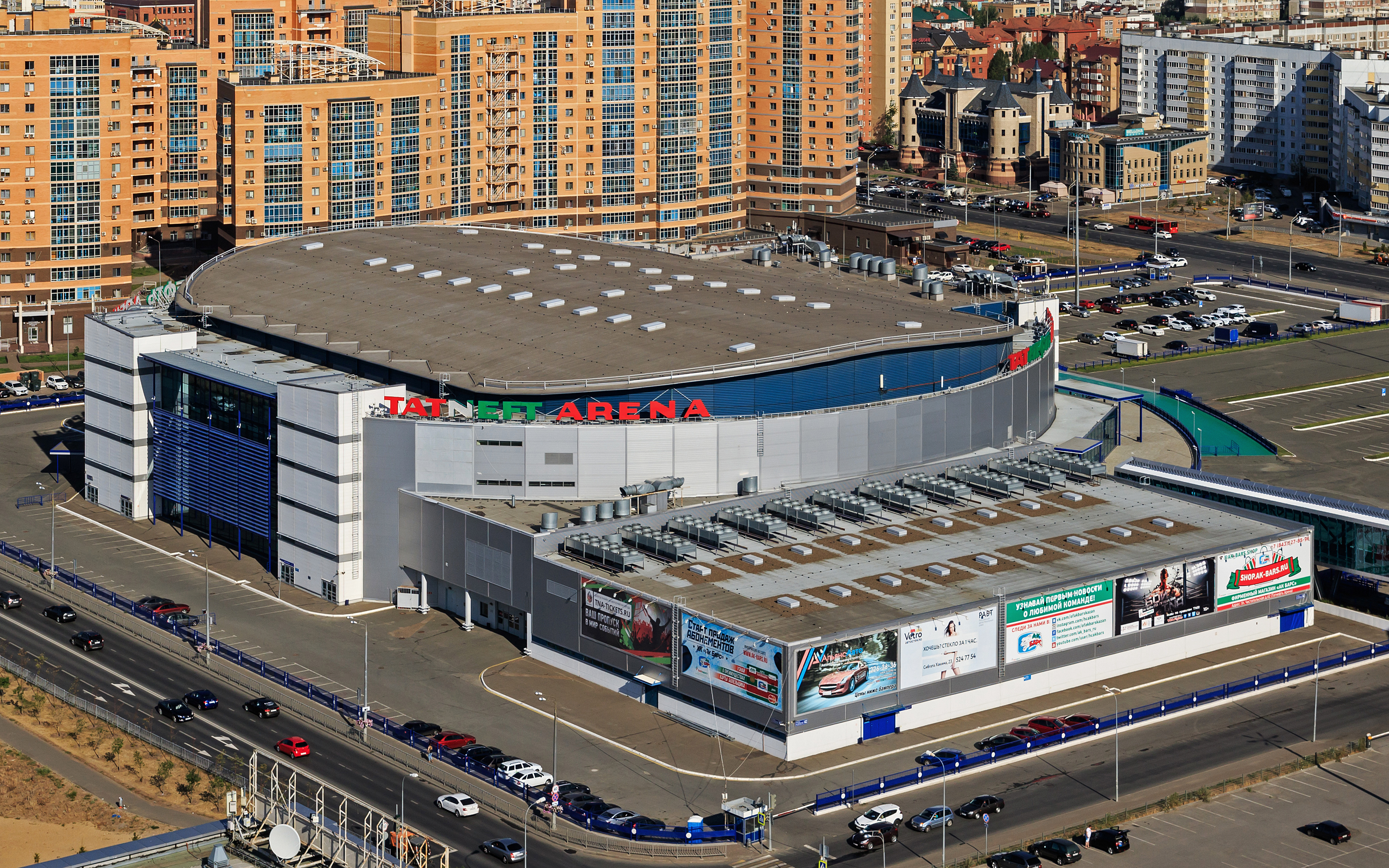
TatNeft Arena in Kazan hosted the 2014 Contest.

Hosts	Country/Region	City	Years
3	Turkey	Eskişehir	2013
3	Turkey	Istanbul	2015
3	Turkey	Istanbul	2020
1	Tatarstan	Kazan	2014

== Bala Turkvision Song Contest ==
The Bala Turkvision Song Contest was intended to be an annual children's version of the Turkvision Song Contest based on the format of the Junior Eurovision Song Contest. Contestants had to be aged between 8 and 15 and had to perform in a Turkic language. Only one edition of the Bala Turkvision Song Contest took place, on 15 December 2015, and it included 13 countries and regions. It had been announced on 7 June 2015, that the inaugural Bala Turkvision Song Contest would be held in Mary, Turkmenistan, however, it was later decided that it would take place in Istanbul, Turkey, but it did not materialize and the contest disappeared without a trace. Eligible to participate were Turkic regions, which had either a large Turkic population or a widely spoken Turkic language. Participating countries and regions included Albania, Azerbaijan, Belarus, Gagauzia, Georgia, Iran, Kazakhstan, Kosovo, Kyrgyzstan, Macedonia, Romania, Turkey, and Ukraine. Azerbaijan was the winner of the event with the song "Cocukluk Yillari" performed by Nuray Rahman and Ahmed Amirli.

== Notes and references ==
=== Footnotes ===
1. Broadcast the 2013 final live on the local channel Bengu Turk for Bulgarian Turks.
2. These countries were on the preliminary participation list for 2013 contest but later withdrew prior to the finalised list of participating regions, for unknown reasons.
3. These countries were on the preliminary participation list for 2015 contest but were later forced to withdraw due to the Ministry of Culture banning Russian regions from the TURKSOY organisation.
4. Participated since 2013 contest under the joint-regional name of Kabardino-Balkaria and Karachay-Cherkessia.
