= Yulduz Usmonova =

- Юлдуз Усмонова
- Born: Yulduz Ibrahimovna Usmonova; 12 December 1963 (age 62); Margilan, Uzbek SSR, Soviet Union
- Other name: Yıldız Usmonova
- Occupations: Singer; actress; songwriter; composer
- Years active: 1991–present
- Children: Nilufar Usmonova
- Musical career
- Genres: Pop
- Instrument: Vocals
- Website: www.yulduz.uz

Yulduz Ibrahimovna Usmonova (Uzbek: Юлдуз Иброҳимовна Усмонова; born 12 December 1963), also known as Yıldız Usmonova, is an Uzbek singer, songwriter, composer and actress. She is the People's Artist of Uzbekistan and honored artist of Kazakhstan, Turkmenistan and Tajikistan. She has achieved widespread fame in Uzbekistan, other parts of Central Asia, and more recently in Turkey. Usmonova has also acted in a number of Uzbek films.

Yulduz Usmonova was born in Margilan in the Ferghana region of Uzbekistan. Her parents worked at a silk factory. She studied music at the pedagogical institute in Margilan.

She was discovered by Gavharxonim Rahimova after singing at a Women’s Day show. Rahimova helped to open many doors for Usmanova. After being introduced to professors from the Uzbekistan State Conservatory, she prepared under their guidance. She studied vocal, and then later became a popular singer in Uzbekistan after independence in 1991. She became famous throughout Central Asia and later in Turkey and has released songs in many languages, such as Uzbek, Uyghur, Turkish, Russian, Tajik, Arabic, Kazakh, Indian and Tatar.

== Works ==
Yulduz Usmonova, through the creative use of folk melodies, enriched with the spirit of patriotism, created songs based on the verses of Muhammad Yusuf and many other poets (We won't give you to anyone, Uzbekistan), (May you remain ours, my people). Furthermore, Uzbek music in the 20th century included traditional lyrical songs (Nastarin, Sanamgina, Qizil Olma), festive songs (Nozanin, Buxorodan kuyov Qiling), lyrical-dramatic compositions (Ona, Shoh va gado, Otajon, Allohim, Muhammad Yusufga), and performed a range of foreign and friendly nations' songs on stage, such as "Allah Allah Ya-Baba" (in Arabic), "Dunyo" (in Turkish), "Parvardigori" (in Persian).

In the late 1980s, Yulduz Usmonova released her debut album, "Mayda". In 1990, she won second place in the international competition "Osiyo ovozi," held in Alma-Ata. Following this, her album "Olma-Olma" was well-received on the World Music Charts Europe, reaching high rankings. Her song "I Wish You Were Here," with English and Uzbek lyrics, achieved high ratings on several European pop charts. Later, she released albums such as "Jannona" (1995), "Men shu yerda bo'lsang" (1995), "Binafsha" (1996), "Tanlov albomi" (1997), and "Dunyo" (1999). Additionally, in 1999, Yulduz Usmonova participated in a music festival in the Netherlands. In 2002, she was honored with the title "Middle Asia's Queen of the Arts".

== Filmography ==
Film
Year	Film	Role	Notes
1991	Temir erkak	Yulduz	
1992	Olov qaʻridagi farishta	Nargiza	Singing
1995	Bolajon	Herself	Cameo
2000	Tohir va Zuhra yangi talqin	Herself	Cameo
2004	Muhabbat sinovlari 2	Herself	Cameo
2004	Qalblar toʻlqini	Nodira	Singing
2004	Sarvinoz	Herself	Cameo
2011	Er bermoq - jon bermoq	Herself	Cameo

Music
Year	Film	Film	Notes
1990	Temir xotin	Iron Woman	
1991	Temir erkak	Iron Man	
1992	Olov qaʻridagi farishta		
1992	Kim jinni?		
1995	Bolajon	Kid	
2000	Tohir va Zuhra yangi talqin	Tohir and Zuhra: A New Interpretation	
2004	Muhabbat sinovlari 2		
2004	Qalblar toʻlqini		
2004	Sarvinoz	Sarvinoz	
2005	Nahotki, sen?		
2007	Boʻrilar	Wolves	
2008	Oshiqlar	Sweethearts	
2011	Er bermoq - jon bermoq		
2013	Ojiza		
2015	Yolgʻon dunyo	Imbalanced World	

Music videos
Year	Song title	Artist
2007	"Bir kuning baxsh et"	Nilufar Usmonova
2017	"Нам нужна одна победа"	Akbar ft. Shirin Mamatova

== Discography ==
Studio albums

- 1993: Alma Alma
- 1995: Jannona
- 1996: Binafscha
- 1999: Oqqan daryo oqaveradi
- 1999: Yulduz
- 2001: Buncha goʻzal bu hayot
- 2001: Oshiqlik
- 2002: Yoshligim, beboshligim
- 2003: Mendan meni so'rama
- 2003: О Любви
- 2004: Men oʻzimni topmasam
- 2005: Yondiraman, yonaman
- 2005: Ayol
- 2005: Биё, Жонам
- 2006: Faqat sabr tiladim
- 2007: Kerak boʻlsa jonim fido
- 2007: Oʻzbekiston — qanday bo'lsang shunday sevaman
- 2008: Inadim
- 2009: Dunya
- 2009: Sen ham asra, koʻzmunchogʻingman
- 2010: Tilimdan emas dilimdan
- 2010: Kible Benim Kalbimde
- 2011: Bir Şans Ver
- 2019: Men seni sevaman

== Videography ==
- (1991) “Aylanma“
- (1991) “Qizil olma”
- (2000) “Sevgilim“ (feat. Ruslan Sharipov)
- (2001) “Nozanin” (feat. Ruslan Sharipov)
- (2003) “Mendan meni soʻrama“
- (2003) “Senga”
- (2004) “Qalb”
- (2004) “Men kimman ayt”
- (2004) “Oʻgʻil bola”
- (2005) “Biyo jonam biyo” (In Tajik)
- (2005) “Koʻrmasam boʻlmas”
- (2005) “Nadur” (feat. Akron Ibodullaev)
- (2005) “Sevaman seni” (feat. Davron Ergashev)
- (2006) “Bevafo yorim”
- (2006) “Iymon”
- (2006) “Jon me bari jon” (In Tajik)
- (2006) “Muhabbat”
- (2006) “Oh dilame” (In Tajik)
- (2006) “Sogʻinch”
- (2006) “Тик так” (In Russian)
- (2006) “Ангел мой” (In Russian)
- (2007) “Dadajon”
- (2007) “Oʻp - oʻp”
- (2007) “Oq kema”
- (2007) “Yana bahor”
- (2007) “Любовь моя” (feat. the band "Dostar") (In Russian)
- (2008) “Affet Allahim” (In Turkish)
- (2008) “Babacim” (In Turkish)
- (2008) “Öp” (In Turkish)
- (2008) “Salovat”
- (2008) “Shekilli”
- (2009) “Görmesem Olmaz” (feat Fatih Erkoç)
- (2009) “Yalan”ya (In Turkish)
- (2010) “Beni kovma kalbinden” (In Turkish)
- (2010) “Seni severdim" (In Turkish)
- (2010) “Yalvar guzel Allah`a” (In Turkish)
- (2010) “Yolvor goʻzal Allohga”
- (2011) “Aldadi” (feat. Atham Yuldashev)
- (2011) “Aynanayin”
- (2011) “Belli belli” (In Turkish)
- (2011) “Dunya” (In Turkish)
- (2011) “Ey yor” (In Tajik)
- (2011) “Koʻz yoshim oqar”
- (2018) "Yalli-yalli"
- (2019) "Taralli dalli"
- (2022) "Muhabbat"
- (2022) "Yor biyo" (In Tajik, feat Malik)
- (2022) "Bu sevgi"
- (2022) "Tojiki medonet" (in Tajik, feat Malik)
- (2022) "Kel"
- (2022) "Bas" (in Tajik)
- (2023) "DA KUJO SHUMO" (in Uzbek and Tajik, feat Malik)

== Awards ==
She has been the laureate of several international music competitions (Yurmala, 1989; Alma-Ata, 1991). She was awarded the title of "Dame of Eastern Songs" (2000, Turkey). She has performed on stage in Europe, Asia, America, and North Africa. She served as a two-term deputy in the Supreme Council of the Republic of Uzbekistan (1995-2000).

- Honored "Artist of Uzbekistan" (1993)
- People's Artist of Uzbekistan (1995)
- "Qoraqalpog‘iston xalq artisti" ("People's Artist of Karakalpakstan") (2000)
- Order of Outstanding Merit (2005)
- "Shuhrat" medali ("Shuhrat" Medal) (2021)
- "El-yurt hurmati" ordeni (Order of "Respect of the Country").
- Hormatly "Türkmenistanyň suratkeşi" (Honored "Artist of Turkmenistan")
