= Jiidesh Idirisova =

Jiidesh Idirisova Жийдеш Идирисова
- Born: 19 January 1985 (age 41); Naryn, Kirghiz SSR, Soviet Union
- Occupation: Singer
- Label: Kaymak Music

Jiidesh Idirisova (Kyrgyz: Жийдеш Идирисова; born 19 January 1985), also known as Jeedesh, is a Kyrgyzstani singer and performer. She represented Kyrgyzstan in the Turkvision Song Contest 2015 with the song "Kim bilet", winning the competition.

== Biography ==
Idirisova was born on 19 January 1985 in the city of Naryn. Her mother was a musician and did not want her daughter to follow a musical career. After singing since childhood, Idirisova's career began when she was accepted as a member of the group Kerben. Later she was a member of the group Artek for over six years, before she started her solo career in 2014. Later that year, she released the single "Late". In 2014, Idirisova also had a role in the film Bolshevik ljudi: Zjol Inclusive. Idirisova is a member of the Kyrgyz KVN team "Asia MIX". In August 2016, she appeared in a promotional video for the 2016 World Nomad Games, which were held in Kyrgyzstan. In 2018, she participated in the Star of Asia Song Festival in Almaty with the song "Narinai". Since September 2018, she has been a member of the jury on the TV programme "Asman".

== Turkvision Song Contest ==
After winning Kyrgyzstan's national Turkvision Song Contest final in 2015 with the pop song "Kim bilet", against seven other entrants. She won the international competition in December of the same year. The judges awarded her 194 points. The song was composed by Kyyalbek Urmanbetov. It was the first time that Kyrgyzstan had won the contest.

== Personal life ==
Idirisova has been in a relationship with singer-producer Andrei Dugay since 2010; they married in 2016 and have two daughters.

== Discography ==
Albums
Title	Details	Ref.
Jiideş (Жийдеш)	Released: 2017; Label: Kaymak Music; Format: Digital download	

Preceded by Zhanar Dugalova with "Izin kórem"	Winner of the Turkvision Song Contest; 2015	Succeeded by Natalie Papazoglu with "Tikenli yol"
