= Mirza Šoljanin =

- Born: 11 January 1985 (age 41); Sjenica, SR Serbia, SFR Yugoslavia
- Occupation: singer
- Years active: 2010–present
- Musical career
- Genres: ballad; sevdalinka
- Instrument: vocals

Mirza Šoljanin (born 11 January 1985) is a Bosnian singer and winner of the third season of the Bosnian television singing contest Zvijezda možeš biti ti (You Can Be a Star).

== Early life ==
Šoljanin was born in Sjenica, Serbia, into an ethnic Bosniak family. He moved to the Bosnian capital city Sarajevo in 2004 to attend the University of Sarajevo's Faculty of Forestry.

== Career ==
Šoljanin auditioned for the third season of the Bosnian television singing contest Zvijezda možeš biti ti (You Can Be a Star) in 2010 on Hayat TV. He won on 17 February 2011. His debut studio album, Poljubi me (Kiss Me), was released on 3 July 2011 through the label Hayat Production. The title song served as the album's lead single and premiered 9 March 2011.

With the Bosnian rock band Emir & Frozen Camels, Šoljanin recorded the song "Ters Bosanka" in 2013. They entered the song into the inaugural Turkvision Song Contest 2013 in December 2013 and finished in sixth place. The music video featured Bosnian pin-up Idda van Munster and premiered on 3 December.

== Personal life ==
On 30 June 2012 Šoljanin married Merima Džeko, sister of football player Edin Džeko. They divorced a year later.

== Discography ==
- Poljubi me (2011)
