= Natalie Papazoglu =

Gagauz-Ukrainian singer (born 1983)

Natalie Papazoglu Наталія Папазоглу
- Born: Natalia Papazohlu; 1983 (age 42–43); Kalush, Ukrainian SSR, Soviet Union
- Occupations: Singer, songwriter

Natalie Papazoglu (Ukrainian: Наталія Папазоглу, Natalija Papazohlu; born 1983) is a Gagauz-Ukrainian singer-songwriter. She participated in season 6 of the Ukrainian X-Factor, and won the Turkvision Song Contest 2020 with the song "Tikenli yol", representing Ukraine.

== Early life ==
Papazoglu was born in Kalush, Ukraine in 1983 to a Gagauz father. She was a student at Borys Hrinchenko Kyiv University.

== Career ==
=== X-Factor ===
In 2015, Papazoglu participated in season 6 of the Ukrainian X-Factor, finishing in fourth place.

=== Turkvision Song Contest ===
Papazoglu had originally been selected to represent Ukraine in the Turkvision Song Contest 2016, however the contest was later cancelled. She was again selected to represent Ukraine in the 2020 contest with the self-written song "Tikenli yol", which had originally been written for the 2016 contest. She had expressed regret that the competition would be held online, stating that it did not allow her to show all of her team's ideas. She won the contest, held on 20 December 2020, with 226 points. Ukrainian Foreign Minister Dmytro Kuleba congratulated Papazoglu on her victory.

== Discography ==
=== Extended plays ===
Title	Details
Ne voroh (Не ворог)	Released: 6 December 2017; Label: FDR Music; Formats: Digital download, streaming

=== Singles ===
Title	Year
"Run Away"	2017
"Good Morning, Ukraine"	2017

Preceded by Jiidesh İdirisova with "Kim bilet"	Winner of the Turkvision Song Contest; 2020	Succeeded by Incumbent
