= Nilufar Usmonova =

Nilufar Usmanova
- Birth name: Nilufar Hakimova Ibrohimxonovna
- Born: 6 April 1987 (age 37)
- Origin: Tashkent, Uzbek SSR, USSR
- Genres: Pop; Uzbek music
- Occupation(s): Singer, actress
- Years active: 1995–present
- Labels: RizaNova
- Website: www.nilufarusmonova.uz

Nilufar Usmanova (Uzbek: Nilufar Usmonova,) (born 6 April 1987) is an Uzbek singer and actress. She received primary education in school number 18 (in Margilan) and number 17 (in Tashkent). At age 10 her parents sent her to the United Kingdom, where during four years she studied in educational institutions such as the Vinehall School (1996–1999) and Sherborne International College (1999–2000). In 2001 Nilufar returned to Uzbekistan, entered to the Tashkent Ulugbek International School and finished it in 2004.In 2006, Nilufar, aiming to become lawyer, started studying in Tashkent State Law University and graduated in 2013.

== Personal life ==
In 2004, Nilufar Usmanova married a young lawyer Novzod Saidgaziev. In 2004, they had a son, Saidazam, and in the same year, the couple got divorced. In 2009 Nilufar married for the second time. From this marriage, in 2011 she gave birth to a son Ibrahim, and in 2012 to another son called Suleiman. In 2019, she changed her name to Aisha.

== Career ==
At the age of 8 Nilufar sang her first song "Shaytonga buysungan yuraklar" in a duet with her mother Yulduz Usmanova. In 1995, video for the song "Shaytonga buysungan yuraklar" was released and in the same year, as part of a solo concert of Yulduz Usmanova, Nilufar first appeared on a big stage, debuting with her mother. In 1995 she starred in the leading role in the movie Bolajon with Uzbek actor Mirza Holmedov and her mother Yulduz Usmanova. In 2002 and 2003, she starred in such films as Muhabbat sinovlari (Trials of love) and Muhabbat sinovlari – 2 (trials of love 2).

Her professional career began in 2005 with the release of the song "Bolam shu yurt seniki" (My child this land is yours). In 2006 she signed a contract with Tarona Records company and in the same year Nilufar had the title role in the film Burilar (Wolves). In 2007, the song "Taslim buldim" (I gave up) was released, which later became a hit. In the same year she presented another hit "Bir Kuning Baxsh et" (Devote one your days). In 2008, the first studio album was recorded, "Taslim Buldim!" (I gave up) and new single "Bevafo yorim" (Untrustworthy lover). In 2009, there was the release of the second studio album Bahtingni kutgin (Wait for your happiness) most singles of which were performed in duets with domestic singers (with Otabek Mutalhodzhaev "Mayli, mayli," (Alright) with Akbar Atamuhammedov (band "Sado") "Voy-Doda" (Oh My God) with Shahruhhon "Senga bulsin!" (Let it be for you) and with Shahriyor). In the same year she recorded the song "Uchar kiz" (Flying girl) (Yalanci şahidim).

In 2010 and 2011, she released such songs as "Farishtalar" (Angels) (a soundtrack for the film Poyma poy), "Tasanno" (Bravo), "Khayolim ugrisi" (Robber of my mind), "Serobginam" (My plentiful), "Karay olasanmi?" (Can you look at?). Next year 2012 was marked with the premiere of singles and videos, "Jani", "Qayt" (Come back), duets "Aytishuv" (Battle) with Doniyar Bekturdiev (singer from Khorezm) and "Illo" with Yulduz Usmanova. In 2013 she recorded singles and made videos "Ana-ana" (Here it is) and "Kadrimga et" (Appreciate me), "Hey bola" (Hey guy), "Unutgin" (Forget). 2014: "Chapanigina Uzbegim" (My common Uzbek), "Kuyla-kuyla" (Sing-sing). On 31 January and 1 February 2015 in Istanbul (Turkey) Nilufar Usmanova performed with the concert program. In the spring of 2015 there were two videos made for the song "Maktab" (School) and "Dunyo" (World). In June there were video shoots for the song "Bir donang bulay" (Let me be your only one), the video was released in July 2015.

== Discography ==
Year	Album
2008	Taslim boʻldim
2009	Baxtingni kutgin
2013	Qadrimga yet
2015	Dunyo

== Filmography ==
This is a chronologically-ordered list of films in which Nilufar has appeared.

Year	Title	Notes
1995	Bolajon	Herself
2002	Muhabbat sinovlari	Nilufar
2003	Muhabbat sinovlari 2	Nilufar
2007	Bo'rilar	Madina
2008	Quvg'in	Madina
2010	Ada emas, dada! Tohir va Zuhra 2 yangi talqin	Herself
2011	G'aroyib orzular	Herself

Music videos
Year	Song title	Artist
2013	"Nilufarim"	Jahongir Foziljonov

== Music videos ==
Year	Video	Director
1995	Shaytonga bo'ysungan yuraklar (Hearts obeyed devil)	
1997	Otajon (Dear father)	
2001	Yur (Let's go)	Rustam Sagdiev
2005	Bolam (Dear child)	9999 studio
2006	Qachon sezadi (When will feel) Samarqand qiziman (I'm a girl of Samarkand)	Djasur Shametov 9999 studio
2007	Taslim bo'ldim (I gave up) Aybim (My fault) Bir kuning baxsh et (Devote one of your days)	Djasur Shametov Sharq cinema Yodgor Nosirov
2008	Oshiqligim bilmading (Didn’tt know my amorousness) Mayli-mayli (feat. Otabek Mutalhodzhaev) (Alright) Voy doda (feat. Akbar Atamuhammedov) (Oh my God)	Sharq cinema Muzaffar Erkinov Nodir Muminov
2008	Aybim sevganim	Aziz
2009	Bevafo yor (Untrustworthy lover) Armonli muhabbat (Unfulfilled Love) Farishtalar (Angels) Sen yetim emassan (You are not an orphan)	Yodgor Nosirov Sharq cinema Sharq cinema 9999 studio
2010	Uchar qiz (Yalanci şahidim) (Rafet El Roman cover) (Flying girl) Tasanno (Bravo) Hayolimning o'g'risi (Robber of my mind) Serobginam (My plentiful) Sunny (Boney M cover) (feat. Shahriyor and Anora and Munisa Rizaeva)	Sharq cinema Yodgor Nosirov Jasur Shametov Jasur Shametov
2011	Jani (Jani) Qaray olasanmi (Can you look at?)	Nozim Jumaev Yodgor Nosirov
2011	Bahor	
2012	Qayt (Come back) Uylanding (You got married )	Akrom Tolipov Sharq cinema
2013	Ana-ana (Here it is) Qadrimga yet (Appreciate me) Ey bola (Hey boy) Unutgin (Forget)	Dilmurod Sharipov Yodgor Nosirov Yodgor Nosirov Yodgor Nosirov
2014	Chapanigina O'zbegim (My common Uzbek ) Kuyla-kuyla (Sing)	Sarvar Isaev Yodgor Nosirov
2014	Sevgi qissasi	Sarvar Isaev
2015	Dunyo (World) Maktab (School) Dona (Let me be your only one)	Timur Primkulov Yassaviy Yigitali Mamadjanov
2016	Kelaqol jonim	Jakhongir Ahmedov
2016	Chin sevaman	Jakhongir Ibragimov
2016	Kel ikkimiz	Sarvar Isaev
2017	Aladdin	Alisher Uzakov

== Awards ==
Year	Award	Nomination	Result
2007	"Star hit-parade" radio "Uzbegim taronasi»	Golden disc	Victory (for the song "Бир кунинг бахш эт!" (Devote one day)
2010	"M&TVA»	"best singer of the year»	Victory
2011	"Star hit-parade" radio "Uzbegim taronasi»	Golden disc	Victory (for the song "Тасанно" (Bravo))
2012	"Star hit-parade" radio "Uzbegim taronasi»	Golden disc	Victory (for the song "Карай оласанми" (Can you look at?) and for the duet "Айтишув" with Diniyar Bekturdiev (a singer from Khorezm))
