= Avni Qahili =

Macedonian-Albanian television presenter (born 1967)

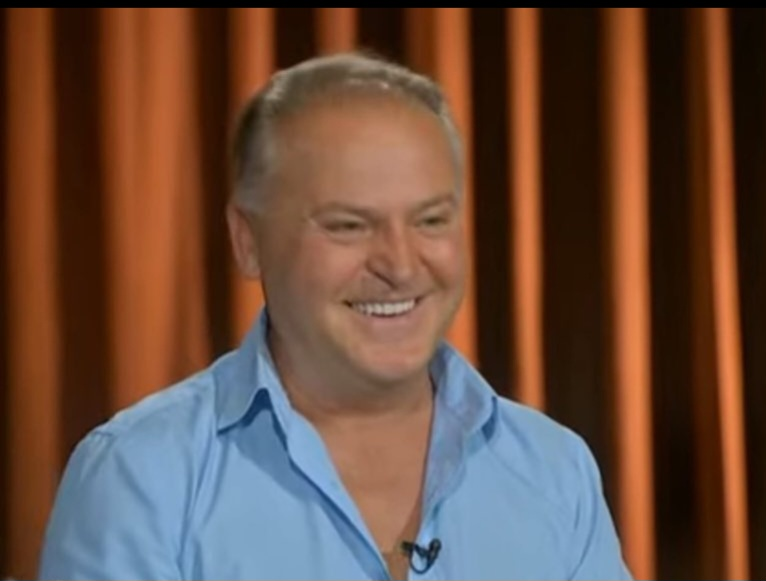
- Born: September 12, 1967 (age 58)
- Known for: Songwriting and television presenting

Avni Qahili (born 12 September 1967) is a Macedonian-Albanian television presenter, songwriter and musician.

== Life ==
Qahili finished studies in Prishtina in 1991 and studied in Skopje in 1993. He was hired in Macedonian National Television in 1992, where he still works up to this date. Qahili had been cooperating with Kosovo's magazine "Zëri", magazine in Macedonia "Bis", magazine in Albania "Paloma" and with DW (Deutsche Welle) in the "Periskop" project. He is the author of approximately 5000 song lyrics, and has been working with almost all new and famous Albanian singers.

In many various festivals his songs have gotten to the first place and also have been rewarded with the best lyric writer (author) on the same festivals. Worth highlighting is the prize for Best Lyrics in 2004 in the "Ohridski Trubaduri" International festival of Ohrid.

From 2022 until 2023, he completed two-year master's studies in media and communication in UBT Prishtina, while now he is pursuing doctoral studies in media and communication.

Qahili had realized thousands of television programs and shows which have been the most viewed in republican level and region, with which many times have awarded him the "Journalist of the year" from Macedonian National Television.

He is the head of the board of "Netët e klipit shqiptar", "Miss Shqipëria" and "Miss Globe International", and a member of the Macedonian team for choosing the song for the Eurovision Song Contest. In addition, Qahili was the chief of the Albanian delegation on Turkvision Song Contest, and many other well known festivals.

He presents various musical spectacles and also various literature and cultural promotions.

Qahili works in Skopje – his birthplace, even though during the year he travels the world more than he is home.
