= Beyza Durmaz =

Turkish singer, songwriter, and composer

- Born: 5 August 1977 (age 49); Istanbul, Turkey
- Education: Istanbul University
- Occupations: Singer; songwriter; composer
- Musical career
- Genres: Pop
- Years active: 2005–present
- Labels: MZKL; Poll
- Website: www.beyzadurmaz.com

Beyza Durmaz (born 5 August 1977) is a Turkish singer, songwriter, and composer.

== Life and career ==
Having completed her high school education at the Private Culture High School, Durmaz took various courses in singing, guitar, piano and Turkish Art Music, at the same period while she was studying at the Faculty of Business Administration of Istanbul University, and then joined the group "Nefes" as a soloist. After graduating from university, she began to perform as Mustafa Sandal's back vocalist.

She was first featured on Burak Demir's album Dreamin' İstanbul as a guest vocalist. Durmaz's first album Koku was released in 2005. It was produced by Volkan Gucer and composed by Burak Demir. The songs on this album were written by Durmaz herself. She also sang the song for the main title of the series Sihirli Annem which was broadcast for 7 seasons.

She also collaborated with the Italian group Nemas Project on the album "Snow in Istanbul". Together with Ali Cem Çehreli, Durmaz also wrote and composed the song "Hüsran" for Mustafa Ceceli's album "Kalpten".

In 2015, she released a music video for the song "Olan Var Olmayan Var". The song ranked eighth on Google's list of most-searched songs in Turkey in 2015.

== Discography ==
Albums

- Koku (2005)

EPs

- Olan Var Olmayan Var (2015)

Singles

- "Ben N'aptım" (2016)
- "Miras" (2018)
- "Wake Up" (feat. ToldorTunes) (2019)

== Awards and nominations ==
Year	Award	Category	Nominee	Result	Ref.
2006	POPSAV 1. Achievement Awards	Best Female Newcomer Singer of the Year	Beyza Durmaz	Nominated	
2006	12th Kral TV Video Music Awards	Best Female Newcomer Singer of the Year	Beyza Durmaz	Nominated	
