= Turkvision Song Contest 2013 =

1st Turkvision Song Contest

- Türkvizyon Eskişehir 2013

Dates and venue
- Semi-final: 19 December 2013
- Final: 21 December 2013
- Venue: Anadolu Üniversitesi BESYO Spor Salonu, Eskişehir, Turkey

Production
- Host broadcaster: Turkish Radio and Television Corporation (TRT)
- Director: İsmet Zaatov
- Presenters: Semi-final: Ece Vahapoğlu; Vatan Sasmaz; Final: Engin Hepileri

Participants
- Number of entries: 24
- Debuting countries: 24: Altai Republic; Azerbaijan; Bashkortostan; Belarus; Bosnia and Herzegovina; Crimea; Gagauzia; Georgia; Iraq; / Kabardino-Balkaria & Karachay-Cherkessia; Kazakhstan; Kosovo; Kemerovo; Khakassia; Kyrgyzstan; Macedonia; Northern Cyprus; Romania; Tatarstan; Turkey; Tuva; Ukraine; Uzbekistan; Yakutia
- Participation map: Participating countries Did not qualify from the semi-final

Vote
- Winning song: Azerbaijan "Yaşa"

Turkvision Song Contest 2013 (Turkish: Türkvizyon Şarkı Yarışması 2013) was the inaugural edition of the Turkvision Song Contest, held in Eskişehir, Turkey. Twenty-four Turkic regions, which have either a large Turkic population or a widely spoken Turkic language, participated in the contest. The semi-final took place on 19 December 2013, while the final took place on 21 December 2013.

== Location ==
Location of the host city in Turkey.

Eskişehir is a city in northwestern Turkey and the capital of the Eskişehir Province. According to the 2011 census, the population of the city is 711,396. The city is located on the banks of the Porsuk River, 792 m above sea level, where it overlooks the fertile Phrygian Valley. In the nearby hills one can find hot springs. The city is 233 km (145 mi) to the west of Ankara, 330 km (205 mi) to the southeast of Istanbul and 78 km (48 mi) to the northeast of Kütahya. Known as a university town, both Eskişehir Osmangazi University and Anadolu University (which has one of the largest student enrollments in the world) are based in Eskişehir. The province covers an area of 2,678 km^{2} (1,034 sq mi).

== Format ==
The contest consisted of a semi-final held on 19 December 2013, and a grand final which took place on the evening of 21 December 2013. The twenty-four participating regions took part in the semi-final, of which twelve qualified and proceeded to the grand final.

Voting was done by one juror from each country. These jurors did not have to have any music industry experience. The scoring method and how each participating country/region was not announced, however they were allowed to vote for their own country/region.

=== National host broadcaster ===
Turkish Radio and Television Corporation (TRT) was the host broadcaster for the inaugural contest. The contest was broadcast by TRT on TRT Avaz, TRT Music and TRT Anadolu.

== Participation ==
A total of twenty-four Turkic-related areas took part in the first edition of the contest. Previously announced competitors Turkmenistan, Chuvashia, Russia, and Xinjiang were not part of the final lineup announced on 17 December.

=== Semi-final ===
The semi-final took place on 19 December 2013. Twelve regions qualified and proceeded to the grand final.

Draw	Country	Artist	Song	Language
1	Altai Republic	Artur Marlujokov	"Altayım Menin" (Алтайым Менин)	Altai
2	Azerbaijan	Farid Hasanov	"Yaşa"	Azerbaijani
3	Bashkortostan	Diana Ishniyazova	"Kuray Şarkısı"	Bashkir
4	Belarus	Gunesh Abasova	"Son Hatıralar"	Turkish
5	Bosnia and Herzegovina	Emir & Frozen Camels feat. Mirza Šoljanin	"Ters Bosanka"	Bosnian
6	Gagauzia	Lüdmila Tukan	"Vernis' lyubov'" (Вернись любовь)	Gagauz, Russian
7	Georgia	Eynar Balakişiyev & Afik Novruzov	"Qelbini Saf Tut"	Azerbaijani
8	Khakassia	Vladimir Dorju	"Tus Çirinde"	Khakas
9	Iraq	Ahmet Tuzlu	"Kerkük'ten Yola Çıkak"	Iraqi Turkmen
10	Kabardino-Balkaria &; Karachay-Cherkessia	Eldar Zhanikaev	"Adamdı bizni atıbız" (Адамды бизни атыбыз)	Karachay-Balkar
11	Kazakhstan	Rin'go	"Birlikpen alǵa" (Бірлікпен алға)	Kazakh
12	Kemerovo	Çildiz Tannakeşeva	"Şoriya'nın Ünü"	Shor
13	Kyrgyzstan	Çoro	"Kaygırba" (Кайгырба)	Kyrgyz
14	Crimea	Elvira Sarihalil	"Dağların elları" (Дагъларын эллары)	Crimean Tatar
15	Kosovo	Ergin Karahasan	"Şu Prizen"	Turkish
16	Northern Cyprus	Gommalar	"Havalanıyor"	Turkish
17	Macedonia	Ikay Yusuf	"Düşlerde Yaşamak"	Turkish
18	Uzbekistan	Nilufar Usmonova	"Unutgin"	Uzbek
19	Romania	Genghiz Erhan Cutcalai	"Ay Ak Shatır"	Turkish
20	Yakutia	Olga Spiridonova	"Kötütüöm" (Көтүтүөм)	Yakut
21	Tatarstan	Alinä Şäripcanova	"Üpkälämim" (Үпкәләмим)	Tatar
22	Tuva	Saylik Ommun	"Çavıdak" (Чавыдак)	Tuvan
23	Turkey	Manevra	"Sen, Ben, Biz"	Turkish
24	Ukraine	Fazile Ibraimova	"Elmalım" (Элмалым)	Crimean Tatar

=== Final ===
The final took place on 21 December 2013. Twelve semi-final qualifiers participated.

Draw	Country	Artist	Song	Language	Points	Place
1	Turkey	Manevra	"Sen, Ben, Biz"	Turkish	187	6
2	Belarus	Gunesh Abasova	"Son Hatıralar"	Turkish	205	2
3	Kosovo	Ergin Karahasan	"Şu Prizen"	Turkish	151	12
4	Kazakhstan	Rin'go	"Birlikpen alǵa" (Бірлікпен алға)	Kazakh	178	9
5	Bosnia and Herzegovina	Emir & Frozen Camels feat. Mirza Šoljanin	"Ters Bosanka"	Bosnian	187	6
6	Tatarstan	Alinä Şäripcanova	"Üpkälämim" (Үпкәләмим)	Tatar	192	4
7	Ukraine	Fazile Ibraimova	"Elmalım" (Элмалым)	Crimean Tatar	200	3
8	Altai Republic	Artur Marlujokov	"Altayım Menin" (Алтайым Менин)	Altai	189	5
9	Azerbaijan	Farid Hasanov	"Yaşa"	Azerbaijani	210	1
10	Northern Cyprus	Gommalar	"Havalanıyor"	Turkish	175	10
11	Kyrgyzstan	Çoro	"Kaygırba" (Кайгырба)	Kyrgyz	183	8
12	Uzbekistan	Nilufar Usmonova	"Unutgin"	Uzbek	173	11

== National jury members ==
Each participating country is represented by one jury member,

- Altai Republic – Vladymyr Konchev
- Azerbaijan – Govhar Hasanzadeh
- Bashkortostan – Aygul Akhmadeeva
- Belarus –
- Bosnia and Herzegovina – Ahmed Švrakić
- Crimea – Seyran Mambetov
- Gagauzia – Piotr Petkovic
- Georgia – Giorgi Chomakashvili
- Iraq – Fethullah Ahmed Salih
- Karachay-Cherkessia – Nadezhda Hadzhieva
- Kazakhstan – Kydyrali Bolmanov
- Kemerovo – Ismet Zaatov
- Khakassia – German Tambaev
- Kosovo – Elif Tokmak
- Kyrgyzstan –
- Macedonia – Eran Hasip
- Northern Cyprus – Ertan Birinci
- Romania – Mioara Girba-Tuțu
- Tatarstan – Damir Davletshin
- Turkey – Ahmet Koç
- Tuva –
- Ukraine – Enver Ismayilov
- Uzbekistan –
- Yakutia -

== International broadcasts ==
Each participating broadcaster is expected to show the contest live enabling the public to vote in the contest.

Broadcasters and commentators in participating countries
Country	Broadcaster	Ref(s)
Altai Republic	STRC "Altai Mountains"	
Azerbaijan	ATV Azerbaijan	
Bashkortostan	Kuray Television	
Belarus	BTRC	
Bosnia and Herzegovina	Hayat TV	
Crimea	Crimea Public Radio and Television	
Gagauzia	GRT	
Georgia	KKTV	
Iraq	Türkmeneli TV	
Kabardino-Balkaria	9 Volna	
Karachay-Cherkessia	9 Volna	
Kazakhstan	Adam Media Group	
Kemerovo	VGTRK	
Khakassia	VGTRK	
Kosovo	RTK	
Kyrgyzstan	Piramida Television	
Macedonia	MRT 2	
Northern Cyprus	GENC Television	
Romania	Alpha TV Media	
Tatarstan	Maydan Television	
Turkey	TRT Avaz, TRT Music, and TRT Anadolu	
Turkey	Kral TV	
Tuva	VGTRK	
Ukraine	Kultura	
Uzbekistan	MTRK	
Yakutia	VGTRK	

Broadcasters and commentators in non-participating countries
Country	Broadcaster	Ref(s)
Bulgaria	Bengu Turk	
Russia	TMV Television	

== See also ==
- Eurovision Song Contest 2013
- Junior Eurovision Song Contest 2013
- ABU TV Song Festival 2013
- European Broadcasting Union
