= Behçet Gücer =

Turkish politician

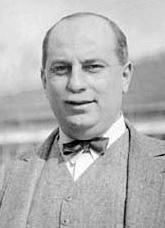

Member of the Grand National Assembly

Personal details
- Born: 1890 Constantinople, Ottoman Empire
- Died: 12 February 1952 (aged 61–62)

Yusuf Behçet Gücer (1890 – 12 February 1952) was a Turkish politician, and a member of the CHP. He furthermore served as a teacher and principal of Galatasaray High School.
