= Armin Muzaferija =

Bosnian singer (born 1988)

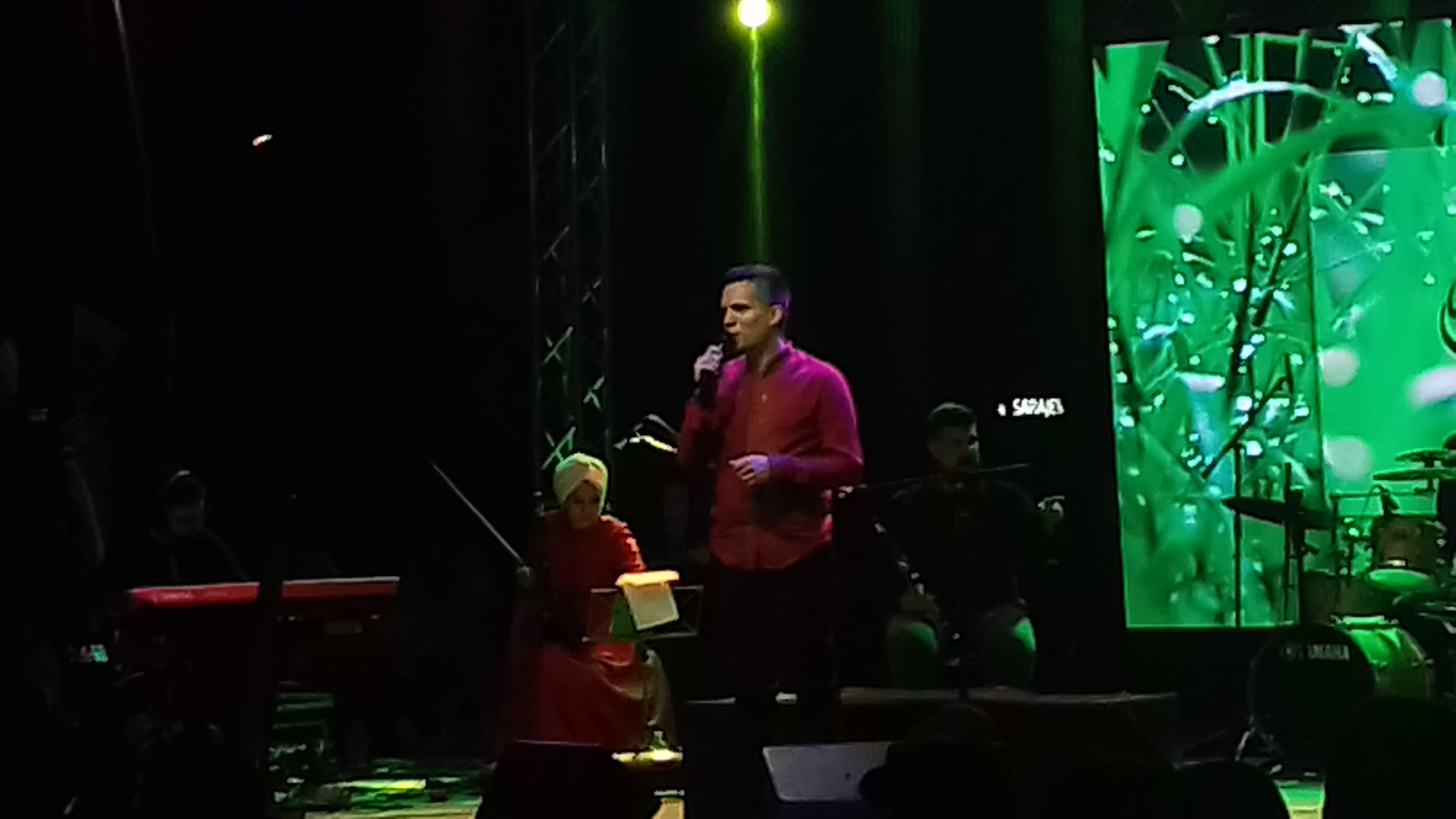

Background information
- Born: 1 December 1988 (age 37); Visoko, SR Bosnia and Herzegovina, SFR Yugoslavia
- Genres: Pop; sevdalinka; ilahija
- Occupation: Singer
- Instruments: Vocals, keyboards, percussion
- Years active: 2000–present
- Labels: Hit Records, Hayat Production
- Website: arminmuzaferija.ba

Armin Muzaferija (born 1 December 1988) is a Bosnian artist and vocal performer. His most popular songs are “Studen vodo”, "Vulkani", "Tvom Resulu", "Lasto mala", "Hadžija" and "Džehva". He has organized numerous concerts around the world, thus presenting the ethno-melodies of the Balkans: USA, England, Scotland, UAE, Morocco, Spain, France, Turkey, Italy, Norway, Germany, etc.

== Biography ==
Armin Muzaferija was born on 1 December 1988 in Visoko, SFR Yugoslavia, present-day Bosnia and Herzegovina. He comes from a prominent Bosniak family. In 2000, he was awarded the Most Promising Young Interpreter Award at the Zenica Traditional Music Festival (that marks his music career beginning). In 2001, Armin won the same festival, followed by many awards at local and regional young talent competitions. In the late summer of 2007, Muzaferija went to study English in the UK, where he attended the prestigious Cambridge University. Upon his return, he enrolled at the Faculty of Economics, University of Sarajevo. In 2007, Armin collaborated with the Bosnian singer-songwriter Hari Varešanović, who authored and arranged the song "Još te volim" (I Still Love You), and with whom Muzaferija performed at the 2007 Melody of Mostar Festival and won the second jury award. Appearing at the 2007 Sunny Scales in Herceg Novi with the song "Povedi me" (Take Me), signed by Varešanović and Fahrudin Pecikoza, he won the high fifth place in the strong competition. In Croatia, Muzaferija performed on "Evening of Sevdah" in Zagreb, Rijeka and Pula. He was also part of a big tour honoring the legendary Indexi, where he performed with music veterans: Hari Varešanović, Aki Rahimovski, Mladen Vojičić Tifa, Željko Bebek, Teška Industrija and other notable names. Muzaferija performed at the 12th Croatian Radio Festival in 2008, where he was awarded two awards for his song "Where My Love Sleeps" in this large competition. In addition to his music career, Muzaferija also made his first acting role in the short documentary feature film Marimaga, premiered as part of the "Sarajevo that is gone" (Sarajevo kojeg više nema) event. In addition to appearing in the film, Muzaferija sang the sevdalinka "Kad ja pođoh na Bentbašu" (When I went to Bentbash) which is also the soundtrack of the film.

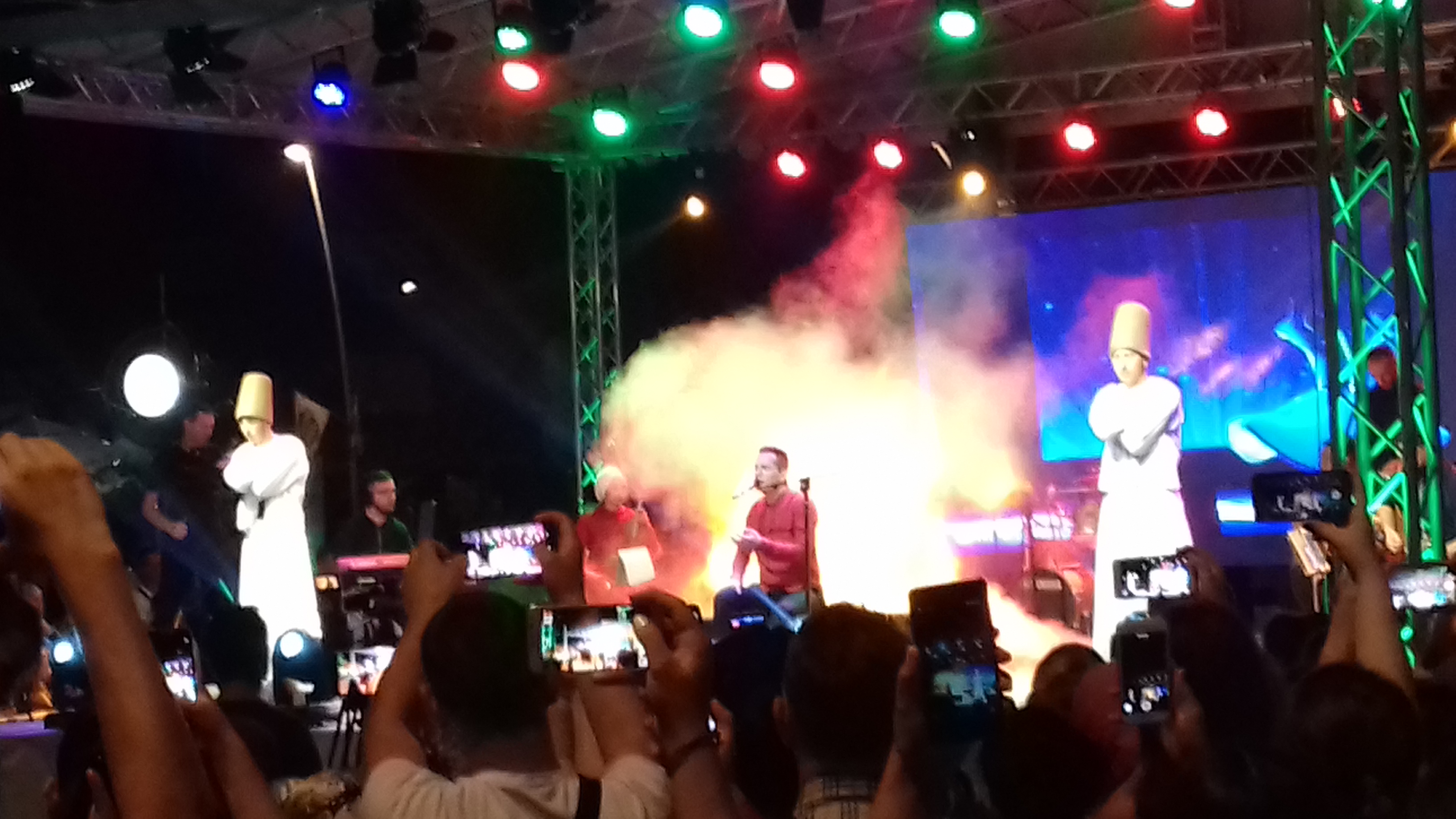
Muzaferija singing on Eid solemnity 2019 in Zenica

On 16 July 2015 (day before Eid al-Fitr 2015), Muzaferija performed on a Bijeljina manifestation "Ramadan in Bosnia" (Ramazan u Bosni / Рамазан у Босни). On 12 August 2019 (2nd day of Eid al-Adha 2019), Muzaferija was the main performer on Zenica city-square concert entitled "Eid solemnity" (Bajramska svečanost / Бајрамска свечаност). and during Eid concerts.

Muzaferija represented Bosnia and Herzegovina in the Turkvision Song Contest 2020 with the song "Džehva". The song placed third out of 26 entries with 194 points.

He is married and has four children with his wife.

== Discography ==
Studio albums

- Još te volim (I Still Love You; Hit Records, 2009)
- Na srcu potpisan (Signed at the Heart; Hayat Production, 2015)

Singles

- "Gdje mi ljubav spava" (Where My Love Sleeps, 2008)
- "Ne mogu da te ne volim" (I Can't Not To Love You, 2009)
- "Šehidi" (Shahids, 2010)
- "Od Mašrika do Magriba" (From Mashriq to Maghreb, 2011)
- "Putujem" (I Travel, 2011)
- "Allahu Allah" (Allah Allah, 2012)
- "S tobom bez tebe" (With You Without You, 2012)
- "Sa tvojih usana" (From Your Lips, 2013)
- "Sultan" (Sultan, 2013)
- "Gdje si ti" (Where Are You, 2015)
- "Samo ti" (Only You, 2016)
- "Biću tu" (I'll Be There, 2018)
- "Tvom Resulu" (To Your Resulla, 2018)
- "Džehva" (2018)
- "Voljenom odlaze voljeni" (Beloved Goes To Beloved, 2019)
- "Studen vodo" (Cold Water, 2021)
