= Gulnur Satylganova =

Kyrgyz singer (born 1968)

- Born: 1 November 1968 (age 57); Toktogul, Jalal-Abad Region, Kyrgyzstan, Soviet Union
- Genres: Pop; soul; dance; folk
- Occupation: singer
- Instrument: vocals

Gulnur Satylganova (Kyrgyz: Гүлнур Сатылганова; born 1 November 1968) is a Kyrgyz singer.

== Biography ==
Satylganova was born in Toktogul in western Kyrgyzstan. From 1987 to 1991, she studied at the conducting department of the Kyrgyz State Institute of Art named after Bübüsara Beyshenalieva (Kyrgyz: Кыргыз мамлекеттик Б.Бейшеналиева атиндагы искунствотитунствотутунствотитунство. Her professor was Nadezhda Kakhlova. At this university, she met such outstanding singers and poets as Kanıkey Eraliyeva and Ataybek Bodoshov.

After graduation, Satylganova worked for some time as an actress. At first she was employed in the "Kuudułdar" theatre (Kyrgyz: Куудулдар), then she moved to the Asanbek Ömüraliev Theatre. Later she started acting onstage. She made her debut as a singer in 1986 and was soon accepted into the music group "Ming kyjał" (Kyrgyz: Миң кыял). Currently, she successfully continues her solo career. Although she is fluent in Russian, she usually performs songs in her native Kyrgyz. She is the winner of many state and international awards and she has been honored, among others, with the title of National Artist of the Kyrgyz Republic in 2008. She was the first Kyrgyz woman to be awarded the Order of St. George.

== Personal life ==
Satylganova was married to Daniel Toktobayev with whom she has a son named Arnaz.
