= Gunesh Abasova =

Belarusian Azerbaijani singer-songwriter (born 1979)

Gunesh Abasova Günəş Abbasova
- Born: 1979 (age 45–46); Baranavichy, Byelorussian SSR, Soviet Union
- Occupation: Singer-songwriter

Gunesh Alisafayevna Abasova (Azerbaijani: Günəş Əlisaf qızı Abbasova; Belarusian: Гюнэш Алісафаеўна Абасава, Güneš Alisafaěwna Abasava; born 1979), often known simply as Gunesh, is a Belarusian-Azerbaijani singer-songwriter. She represented Belarus in the Turkvision Song Contest 2013 with the song "Son Hatıralar".

== Early life ==
Abasova was born in Baranavichy in 1979. She is fluent in Turkish.

== Career ==
In 2004, Abasova collaborated with Belarusian band Krambambula for their album Radio Krambambula 0.33 FM as a vocalist. She recorded two songs in Azerbaijani for the album.

She has attempted to represent Belarus in the Eurovision Song Contest several times since 2005. She competed in the Belarusian national final for the 2005 contest with the song "Call My Name", for the 2006 contest with "Connect the Hearts", for the 2008 contest with "I Can't Live Without You", for the 2009 contest with "Fantastic Girl", for the 2012 contest with "And Morning Will Come" (later changed to "Tell Me Why"), for the 2015 contest with "I Believe in a Miracle", and for the 2018 contest with "I Won't Cry".

She was awarded the second prize for young pop song performers at the 2005 edition of the Slavianski Bazaar in Vitebsk. She later performed at the 2006 edition to celebrate the festival's 15th anniversary.

In 2011, she was awarded the Medal of Francysk Skaryna by President of Belarus Alexander Lukashenko.

Abasova and her song "Son Hatıralar" were revealed as the Belarusian entry for the Turkvision Song Contest 2013 in November 2013. The song was written and composed by Abasova herself. Belarus qualified from the semi-final held on 19 December 2013, and placed second in the final on 21 December 2013 with 205 points.

== Personal life ==
Abasova married her Turkish husband in Istanbul in June 2014. The couple had been engaged since December 2012. She currently resides in Minsk.

== Discography ==
=== Extended plays ===
Title	Details
Gunesh	Released: 2013; Label: Gönenay Ajans; Formats: Digital download, streaming

=== Singles ===
Title	Year
"Heartbroken Woman"	2017
"I Won't Cry"	2018
"My vzjali odnu vysotu" (Мы взяли одну высоту)	2018
"Maršrutami na Vostok" (Маршрутами на Восток)	2018
"Padajem v sneg" (Падаем в снег)	2018
"Razbitomu serdcu" (Разбитому сердцу)	2019
"Beregi mojo serdce" (Береги моё сердце)	2020
