= Volkan Gucer =

Turkish music composer and producer

Volkan Gucer (Turkish: Volkan Gücer) is a music composer, producer, performer on the dilli kaval (Turkish wooden flute), and the Irish whistle.

== Career ==
Originally spelled as Volkan Gücer. With a professional career since 1992, he has written and produced music for 40 TV series and films, as well as numerous documentaries and commercial jingles. He is best known for the songs "Amerikali", "Gölge Çiçegi", and "Gözlerinde Son Gece" that he composed for the movies with the same titles (lyrics by Aysel Gürel). His library CD's, A Kanun Journey Through Turkiye and Vocal Manoeuvers, catalogue many of his most exceptional works and have been used in television on films around the world.

Gucer is a founding member of the Composers, Authors, and Publishers Rights Organisation of Turkey, MSG and a member of Gema.

Along with his interest in wooden flutes, Gucer produced Dreamin' Istanbul of "Burak Demir", "Hancer" & Paslanmaz of "Burak Aziz" and "Koku" of Beyza Durmaz.

Gucer had guest appearances in the concerts of the Italian music group Milagro Acustico Ensemble and Agricantus in Italy and Turkey.

Along with being the producer of the album, Gucer also performed in the concert of Burak Demir's Dreamin' Istanbul Project.

As of 2010, he moved to Germany and produced music tracks with recitative poems with Nez, Ebru Özpirinç, Gülbahar Kültür and Hatice Balaban. He took stage with musicians as Seyran Ismayilkhanov, Serdar Yayla, Atilla Dogan, Deniz Güngör, Hatice Balaban and others.

Despite having a civil engineering bachelor degree, he is now working as a producer, composer, performer as well as career coach in Getacare GmbH, that he is a shareholder and an executive member. Beside his mother tongue Turkish, he can also speak English, French and some German.
