= RTV Novi Pazar =

Serbian television channel

- Country: Serbia
- Broadcast area: Serbia; Bosnia and Herzegovina; Montenegro
- Headquarters: Novi Pazar, Stane Bačanin 29

Programming
- Language(s): Serbian language, Bosnian language
- Picture format: 16:9

Ownership
- Owner: RADIO TELEVIZIJA NOVI PAZAR doo, Novi Pazar
- Key people: Denis Mavrić, CEO

History
- Launched: 2002.
- Former names: Regionalna radio-televizija Novi Pazar

Links
- Website: www.rtvnp.rs

Availability

Terrestrial
- Raška & Sandžak: MUX 2

RTV Novi Pazar (Serbian Cyrillic: РТВ Нови Пазар) is a Serbian commercial television channel with regional coverage.

Company headquarters is located in Novi Pazar. Since 14 August 2015., television channel is privately owned. The program is mainly dedicated to local news from Sandžak and Raška region.
