= Dmitry Koldun discography =

- Studio albums: 1
- Compilation albums: 1
- Singles: 4
- Music videos: 7

This is a comprehensive listing of official releases by Dmitry Koldun, a Belarusian pop rock singer. Koldun has released four singles and four music videos. Koldun is currently working on his first studio album and has a fan-made compilation album. Koldun rose to fame after his performance in the Eurovision Song Contest 2007 with the song Work Your Magic.

== Albums ==
Year	Title	Translation	Chart positions	Sales	Notes
Year	Title	Translation	RUS	Sales	Notes
2009	Колдун: Released: 3 September 2009	Koldun	N/A	N/A	Debut album

=== Other ===
Year	Title	Translation	Chart positions	Sales	Notes
Year	Title	Translation	RUS	Sales	Notes
2008	Work Your Magic: Released: 2007 (Europe)	N/A	N/A	The EP was free for a limited time	The EP was released to promote Koldun's participation in the Eurovision Song Contest
2008	Я Не Волшебник: Released: 25 February 2008	I'm Not a Magician	N/A	N/A	An unofficial album, not endorsed by Koldun but accepted, to some degree, as an album release.

== Singles ==
Year	Single	Album	Chart position			
Year	Single	Album	RUS	LAT	SBN	SWE
2007	"Work Your Magic"	Я Не Волшебник	2	3	34	47
2007	"Я Для Тебя" (Ya Dlya Tyebya)	Я Не Волшебник	5	23	—	—
2008	"Царевна" (Tsarevna)	Я Не Волшебник	13	—	—	—
2008	"Настройся на Меня" (Nastroysya na Menya)	Колдун	39	—	—	—
Number-one hits			—	—	—	—
Top ten hits			2	1	—	—

== Other Singles ==
=== Star Factory ===
The following songs were performed by Koldun during his time as a contestant on the hit Russian TV show Star Factory/Фа́брика звёзд. Some were later available as studio versions.

Title	Pronunciation	Translation
Я прошу	Ya proshu	I Request That I
Тебя лучше нет	Tebya Luchshe Nyet	
На волне	Na volnye	On the Wave
Никогда	Nikagda	Never
Я буду ждать	Ya budu zhdat	I Shall Wait
Я не умру без твоей любви	Ya nye umru bez tvoei liubvi	I Willn’t Die
Ты улетишь	T ulyetish	You Will Depart
Несерьёзно	Neseryozna	Not serious
Я Для Тебя	Ya Dlya Tyebya	I (am) For You
Прости за все	Prosti za vsye	Forgive me for Everything

=== Eurovision entries ===
The following songs were Koldun's entries into the Eurovision Song Contest and their variations.

Eurovision Song Contest	Title	Remixes	Notes
2006	Maybe	-	Failed in the Belarusian national final
2006	Быть Может (Bit' Mozhyet)	-	Russian version of Maybe performed with Koldun's brother
2007	Get Up, Get Down	-	Song was disqualified (though Koldun was not) due to it already being an official song of a Finnish band
2007	Ангел мечты	-	A temporary song to replace the disqualified Get Up, Get Down
2007	Work Your Magic	Deep Zone Project Remix, Deep Zone Project short dance remix, Zoloto remix, Karaoke version	Composed by Philip Kirkorov especially for Koldun who went on to win the national selection and achieve 6th place in the Eurovision final
2007	Дай Мне Силу	Deep Zone Project Remix, Deep Zone Project short dance remix, Zoloto remix, Karaoke version	Russian version of Work Your Magic

== Music videos ==
Year	Title
2006	Быть Может: Russian version of Maybe performed with George Koldun (Koldun's brother)
2007	Work Your Magic: Available on Work Your Magic album and Magic Wrks in Europe
2007	Дай Мне Силу: Available on Work Your Magic album and Magic Works in Europe
2007	Я Для Тебя
2008	Ча-Ча-Ча: Special New Year video & song, shown on Channel 1 Russia
2008	Царевна
2009	Настройся на Меня

=== DVDs ===
Koldun currently has two DVDs, one included with the Work Your Magic album. The DVD included with the album features the video to Work Your Magic in both English and Russian. Koldun's other DVD Magic Works in Europe is a documentary that looks at Koldun's life, his tour around Europe prior to the Eurovision Song Contest 2007, rehearsals in Helsinki and the music video to Work Your Magic.
