= Koldun =

Koldun may refer to:

- Dmitry Koldun (born 1985), Belarusian pop singer
- Koldun, Iran, a village in Isfahan Province, Iran
- Russian monitor Koldun, a Russian Uragan-class monitor
- Koldun (album)
