= I'm Not a Magician =

Я Не Волшебник

Compilation album by Dmitry Koldun
- Released: (Belarus) February 25, 2008 (Russia) February 25, 2008
- Genres: Pop; Rock
- Length: 52:30
- Label: Star Track

Dmitry Koldun chronology
Я Не Волшебник (2008)	Колдун (2009)

Я Не Волшебник (Transliteration: Ya Nye Volshyebnik, English translation: "I'm Not a Magician") is an unofficial compilation album of Dmitry Koldun, a popular singer from Belarus. The album is available, and was primarily only available, in MP3 format. It was later made available as a physical release.

Although the album was allowed to be sold commercially and feature Koldun songs it remains an unofficial album and is, therefore, not considered to be Koldun's first album, which instead refers to the album named Koldum which was released in 2009.

Most singles are from Koldun's participation in Star Factory, although some are officially released singles of Koldun after this period.

The album originally consisted of only 12 songs but due to the popularity of Work Your Magic two more songs were added. Both songs are remixes of the original song and one is in Russian.

== Track listing ==
No.	Title	Length
1.	"Я Для Тебя"	3:30
2.	"Никогда"	3:30
3.	"Reality of Dreams"	3:18
4.	"Царевна"	3:27
5.	"Девушка Моей Мечты"	3:55
6.	"Я Не Умру Без Твоей Любви"	3:27
7.	"Ангел Мечты"	4:31
8.	"Я Буду Ждать"	3:22
9.	"Вальс Бостон"	4:05
10.	"Жизнь В Ритме Танца"	3:58
11.	"Вечный Огонь"	2:32
12.	"Ты Улетишь"	4:01
13.	"Дай Мне Силу (Zoloto Remix)"	3:58
14.	"Work Your Magic (Remix)"	4:37

=== Translated track list ===
English track titles

1. I For You
2. Never
3. Reality of Dreams
4. Princess
5. Girl of My Dreams
6. I do not Die Without Your Love
7. Angel of Dreams
8. I Would Wait
9. Waltz Boston
10. Living In Rhythm Dance
11. Eternal Flame
12. You Fly Away
13. Give Me Power (Zoloto Remix)
14. Work Your Magic (Remix)

== Singles released ==
Officially released singles that feature on the album include:

1. Work Your Magic/Дай Мне Силу (though not a remixed version)
2. Я Для Тебя
3. Царевна
