= Anastasia Vinnikova =

Anastasia Vinnikova Анастасія Віннікава
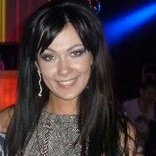

Background information
- Born: 15 April 1991 (age 35); Dzyarzhynsk, Byelorussian SSR, Soviet Union (now Belarus)
- Origin: Dzyarzhynsk, Belarus
- Occupation: Singer
- Website: vinnikova.by

Anastasia Vinnikova, (Belarusian: Анастасія Віннікава, Anastasija Vinnikava; Russian: Анастасия Винникова) born 15 April 1991 is a Belarusian singer. She represented her country at the Eurovision Song Contest 2011 with the song "I Love Belarus", but failed to qualify to the final.

== History ==
Anastasia Vinnikova was born in Dzyarzhynsk, BSSR on 15 April 1991. Anastasia attended the Minsk State Linguistic University, School of Translation and Interpreting.

== Eurovision ==
Anastasia participated in Eurovision in 2011 with the song "I Love Belarus". The song was written by Evgeny Oleinik. Originally, Vinnikova was to perform the song "Born in Bielorussia" until it was discovered that the song had been previously performed in the summer of 2010. Anastasia competed in the second semi-final at Eurovision. Belarus placed fourteenth with a total of forty-five points.

== Discography ==
=== Singles ===
- 2009 : Your Love Is...
- 2010 : Here We Go for the Gold
- 2010 : Born in Bielorussia
- 2010 : Мама
- 2011 : I Feel You
- 2011 : I Love Belarus (Мая Беларусь-Моя Беларусь)
- 2011 : Shining in Twilight
- 2012 : One Life
- 2012 : Crazy
- 2012 : Календарь
- 2013 : It's My Life with Petr Elfimov
- 2013 : Хто Казаў with Aura
- 2016 : Паранойя
- 2017 : Нулевой рубеж
- 2018 : Нелюбовь

Inconnu :

- Тысячы зор

Awards and achievements
Preceded by 3+2 feat. Robert Wells with "Butterflies"	Belarus in the Eurovision Song Contest; 2011	Succeeded by Litesound with "We Are the Heroes"
