= Belarus in the Eurovision Song Contest 2012 =

- Eurovision Song Contest 2012
- Participating broadcaster: Belarusian Television and Radio Company (BTRC)
- Country: Belarus
- Selection process: Internal selection among Eurofest 2012 entries
- Selection date: 24 February 2012

Competing entry
- Song: "We Are the Heroes"
- Artist: Litesound
- Songwriters: Dmitriy Karyakin; Vladimir Karyakin

Placement
- Semi-final result: Failed to qualify (16th)

Participation chronology

Belarus was represented at the Eurovision Song Contest 2012 with the song "We Are the Heroes", written by Vladimir Karyakin and Dmitry Karyakin, and performed by the band Litesound. The Belarusian participating broadcaster, Belarusian Television and Radio Company (BTRC), selected its entry for the contest through the national final Eurofest 2012. The national final was a televised production which consisted of a semi-final and a final held on 21 December 2011 and 14 February 2012, respectively. Fifteen competing acts participated in the semi-final where the top five entries qualified to the final. In the final, "All My Life" performed by Alyona Lanskaya was initially selected as the winner following the combination of votes from a jury panel and public televoting, however the entry was later disqualified due to vote rigging and replaced by runner-up "We Are the Heroes" performed by Litesound.

Belarus was drawn to compete in the second semi-final of the Eurovision Song Contest which took place on 24 May 2012. Performing during the show in position 5, "We Are the Heroes" was not announced among the top 10 entries of the second semi-final and therefore did not qualify to compete in the final. It was later revealed that Belarus placed sixteenth out of the 18 participating countries in the semi-final with 35 points.

== Background ==
Prior to the 2012 contest, Belarusian Television and Radio Company (BTRC) had participated in the Eurovision Song Contest representing Belarus eight times since its first entry in 2004. Its best placing in the contest was sixth, achieved in 2007 with the song "Work Your Magic" performed by Dmitry Koldun. Following the introduction of semi-finals for the 2004 contest, Belarus had only managed to qualify to the final two times. In 2011, "I Love Belarus" performed by Anastasia Vinnikova failed to qualify to the final.

As part of its duties as participating broadcaster, BTRC organises the selection of its entry in the Eurovision Song Contest and broadcasts the event in the country. The broadcaster has used both internal selections and national finals to select its entry for the contest in the past. For their 2012 entry, BTRC announced that it would organise a national final to choose its entry, the first time since 2009.

== Before Eurovision ==
=== Eurofest 2012 ===
Eurofest 2012 was the national final format developed by BTRC to select its entry for the Eurovision Song Contest 2012. The competition consisted of a semi-final and final held on 21 December 2011 and 14 February 2012, respectively. Both shows were broadcast on the Belarus 1, Belarus TV, and Radius FM as well as online via the broadcaster's official website tvr.by. The final was also broadcast online via the official Eurovision Song Contest website eurovision.tv.

==== Format ====
The competition consisted of three stages. In the first stage, artists and songwriters had the opportunity to apply for the competition by attending live auditions during designated dates. Fifteen entries were selected to participate in the second stage out of all the submitted applications. The second stage was the televised semi-final which took place on 21 December 2011. Five entries advanced to the final based on the 50/50 combination of votes from a public televote and an expert jury. The third stage was the final, which took place on 14 February 2012 where the 50/50 combination of votes from a public televote and an expert jury determined the winner that would represent Belarus in Eurovision out of the five acts. The competition rules also allowed for the finalists to completely change their candidate songs.

The jury panel that participated in the semi-final and final consisted of:

- Alexander Tikhanovich (chairman of the jury) – singer
- Inna Afanasieva – singer
- Alexey Khlestov – singer
- Anatoly Yarmolenko – director of the ensemble Syabry
- Nikolay Skorikov – executive producer of the TV channel Belarus 1
- Yuriy Vashchuk – singer-songwriter, television presenter
- Leonid Shirin – composer
- Evgeny Oleinik – songwriter and producer
- Alexander Mezhenny – choreographer
- Dmitry Baranov – national final project manager

==== Competing entries ====
Artists and composers were able to submit their applications and entries to the broadcaster between 1 November 2011 and 25 November 2011. At the closing of the deadline, 115 artists applied for the competition and 56 songs were received by the broadcaster. Auditions were held at the Youth Variety Theater in Minsk where a jury panel was tasked with selecting fifteen entries to proceed to the televised national final. The jury consisted of Alexander Tikhanovich, Inna Afanasieva, Alexey Khlestov, Anatoly Yarmolenko, Nikolay Skorikov, Yuriy Vashchuk, Leonid Shirin, Evgeny Oleinik, Alexander Mezhenny and Dmitry Baranov. The selected semi-finalists were announced on 6 December 2011. Among the competing artists was Anastasia Vinnikova, who represented Belarus in 2011. The competing entries were presented to the public in the lead up to the national final through special diaries that aired to promote the competition, a weekly review programme broadcast online via the broadcaster's official website and aired on Belarus 1 and Belarus TV.

==== Semi-final ====
The televised semi-final took place on 21 December 2011 at the BTRC studios in Minsk, hosted by Denis Kurian. Prior to the semi-final, a draw for the running order took place on 16 December 2011. A 50/50 combination of votes from jury members made up of music professionals and public televoting selected the top five songs to qualify to the final.

In addition to the performances from the competitors, the show featured guest performances by Lidiya Zablotskaya, who represented Belarus in Junior Eurovision 2011, members of the Theatre of Modern Choreography D.O.Z.SK.I, Inna Afanasieva and Alexey Khlestov.

Semi-final – 21 December 2011
R/O	Artist	Song	Songwriter(s)	Result
1	Anna Blagova	"You"	Anna Blagova, Victor Rudenko	—N/a
2	German	"Keep Faith"	Dmitry Karpinchik, Yuri Mantachik	—N/a
3	Aura	"Hands Up!"	Evgeny Oleinik, Yulia Bykova, Svetlana Geraskova	—N/a
4	Alexandra Gaiduk and Natalia Baldina	"Loveless"	Maxim Oleinikov, Andrey Glushko, Alyona Gorbachova	—N/a
5	Gunesh	"And Morning Will Come"	Isa Melikov, Zahra Badabeyli	Advanced
6	Anastasia Vinnikova	"Shining In Twilight"	Leonid Shirin, Yuriy Vashchuk	—N/a
7	The Champions	"It's Your Time"	Olisa Emeka Orakposim, Vyacheslav Lyschik	—N/a
8	Yan Zhenchak and Outerplain	"We Are the Candles"	Yan Zhenchak	—N/a
9	Ekivoki	"Number One"	Alexander Sukharev, Dmitry Apolenis	—N/a
10	Victoria Aleshko	"Dream"	Evgeny Oleinik, Julia Bykova, Svetlana Geraskova	Advanced
11	Alyona Lanskaya	"All My Life"	Leonid Shirin, Yuriy Vashchuk	Advanced
12	Uzari	"The Winner"	Yuri Naurotski	Advanced
13	Nuteki	"Superheroes"	Mikhail Nokarashvili	—N/a
14	Litesound	"We Are the Heroes"	Vladimir Karyakin, Dmitriy Karyakin	Advanced
15	Thriller	"Message to the World"	Ivan Lutsenko, Anna Gorbachev	—N/a

==== Final ====
The televised final took place on 14 February 2012 at the Sports Palace in Minsk, hosted by Denis Kurian and Leyla Ismailova. Prior to the final, Gunesh opted to change her candidate song, while a draw for the running order took place on 24 January 2012. A 50/50 combination of votes from jury members made up of music professionals and public televoting resulted in a tie between "All My Life" performed by Alyona Lanskaya and "We Are the Heroes" performed by Litesound. Alyona Lanskaya was ultimately selected as the winner as she received the most votes from the public.

In addition to the performances from the competitors, the show featured guest performances by Philip Kirkorov (who represented Russia in 1995), Dmitry Koldun (who represented Belarus in 2007), Sakis Rouvas (who represented Greece in 2004 and 2009), Sinplus (who would represent Switzerland in 2012), and former Eurovision winners Lys Assia (Switzerland 1956), Ruslana (Ukraine 2004), Marija Šerifović (Serbia 2007), Alexander Rybak (Norway 2009) and Ell & Nikki (Azerbaijan 2011).

Winner

Final – 14 February 2012
R/O	Artist	Song	Songwriter(s)	Jury	Televote	Total	Place
1	Alyona Lanskaya	"All My Life"	Leonid Shirin, Yuriy Vashchuk	10	12	22	1
2	Gunesh	"Tell Me Why?"	Isa Melikov, Zahra Badabeyli		7		3
3	Victoria Aleshko	"Dream"	Evgeny Oleinik, Yulia Bykova, Svetlana Geraskova				5
4	Litesound	"We Are the Heroes"	Vladimir Karyakin, Dmitriy Karyakin	12	10	22	2
5	Uzari	"The Winner"	Yuri Naurotski				4

=== Disqualification and replacement ===
Following Alyona Lanskaya's win at Eurofest 2012, the song had been regarded by many international fans as "a terrible song that features child-like lyrics", which led to allegations from Belarusian press that Lanskaya had rigged the televote of the selection in her favour, which led to her "unfair" victory. An investigation following the rumours confirmed that Lanskaya and her producers had rigged the public televote. As a result, she was disqualified from the contest and national final runner-up "We Are the Heroes" performed Litesound was announced as the new Belarusian entry for the Eurovision Song Contest 2012 on 24 February 2012.

=== Preparation ===
On 14 March, BTRC announced that "We Are the Heroes" would undergo changes for the Eurovision Song Contest. The new version of the song was produced by Greek composer Dimitris Kontopoulos who had previously written several Eurovision entries for various countries. The official music video, directed by band members Vladimir Karyakin and Dmitry Karyakin and filmed at the Lipki Aerodrome in Minsk, was released on 16 May.

== At Eurovision ==
According to Eurovision rules, all nations with the exceptions of the host country and the "Big Five" (France, Germany, Italy, Spain and the United Kingdom) are required to qualify from one of two semi-finals in order to compete for the final; the top ten countries from each semi-final progress to the final. The European Broadcasting Union (EBU) split up the competing countries into six different pots based on voting patterns from previous contests, with countries with favourable voting histories put into the same pot. On 25 January 2012, a special allocation draw was held which placed each country into one of the two semi-finals. Belarus was placed into the second semi-final, to be held on 24 May 2012. The running order for the semi-finals was decided through another draw on 20 March 2012 and Belarus was set to perform in position 5, following the entry from Malta and before the entry from Portugal.

The two semi-finals and the final were broadcast in Belarus on the Belarus 1 with commentary by Denis Kurian. BTRC appointed Dmitry Koldun as its spokesperson to announce the Belarusian votes during the final.

=== Semi-final ===
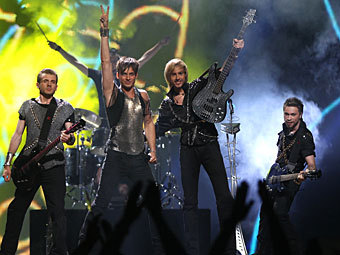
Litesound during a rehearsal before the second semi-final

Litesound took part in technical rehearsals on 4 and 8 May, followed by dress rehearsals on 11 and 12 May. This included the jury show on 11 May where the professional juries of each country watched and voted on the competing entries.

The Belarusian performance featured the members of Litesound performing on stage in a band set-up wearing black biker outfits trimmed with silver accessories, with the lead vocalist of the band Dmitry Karyakin wearing a ripped net t-shirt. During the performance, the guitarists of the band leaned back on their microphone stands into an almost horizontal position by hooking their feet into a strap on the floor, while Karyakin made use of the stage ramp by coming towards the audience. The stage colours were predominantly blue and yellow with the LED screens displaying images of nuts, bolts, cogs and wheel parts. The performance also featured pyrotechnic effects.

At the end of the show, Belarus was not announced among the top 10 entries in the second semi-final and therefore failed to qualify to compete in the final. It was later revealed that Belarus placed sixteenth in the semi-final, receiving a total of 35 points.

=== Voting ===
Voting during the three shows involved each country awarding points from 1-8, 10 and 12 as determined by a combination of 50% national jury and 50% televoting. Each participating broadcaster assembled a jury of five music industry professionals who were citizens of the country they represented. This jury judged each entry based on: vocal capacity; the stage performance; the song's composition and originality; and the overall impression by the act. In addition, no member of a national jury was permitted to be related in any way to any of the competing acts in such a way that they cannot vote impartially and independently.

Below is a breakdown of points awarded to Belarus and awarded by Belarus in the second semi-final and grand final of the contest. The nation awarded its 12 points to Ukraine in the semi-final and to Russia in the final of the contest.

==== Points awarded to Belarus ====
Points awarded to Belarus (Semi-final 2)
Score	Country
12 points	Ukraine
10 points	
8 points	Georgia
7 points	Lithuania
6 points	
5 points	
4 points	Malta
3 points	
2 points	Croatia
1 point	Macedonia; Netherlands

==== Points awarded by Belarus ====
Points awarded by Belarus (Semi-final 2)
Score	Country
12 points	Ukraine
10 points	Lithuania
8 points	Serbia
7 points	Sweden
6 points	Georgia
5 points	Malta
4 points	Estonia
3 points	Norway
2 points	Macedonia
1 point	Croatia

Points awarded by Belarus (Final)
Score	Country
12 points	Russia
10 points	Ukraine
8 points	Lithuania
7 points	Azerbaijan
6 points	Sweden
5 points	Moldova
4 points	Estonia
3 points	Malta
2 points	Macedonia
1 point	Ireland
