= Elgiazar Farashyan =

Belarusian singer

Egiazar Elgiazar Farashyan
- Born: 2 November 1988 (age 37); Armenia
- Origin: Belarus / Armenia
- Genres: Pop
- Occupation: Singer
- Instrument: Vocals
- Years active: 2005–present

Elgiazar Farashyan (Armenian: Եղիազար Ֆարաշյան; Belarusian: Ягіазар (or Егіязар) Фарашян, also known by the mononym Egiazar born 2 November 1988) is a Belarusian singer. Born in Armenia, Farashyan and his family relocated to the Gomel region in eastern Belarus when he was five years old.

Farashyan's musical ambitions were fostered by his mother, a vocal teacher. He studied at the Gomel College of Art.

Along with pop group 3+2, Farashyan represented Belarus in the Eurovision Song Contest 2010. Originally the song "Far Away" was chosen. But eventually Belarus decided to take part with the song "Butterflies".
