= 3+2 =

3+2 may refer to:

- Three Plus Two, a 1963 film
- 3+2 (band), a Belarusian band
- Five, the result of the expression 3+2
