= Belarus in the Eurovision Song Contest 2010 =

- Eurovision Song Contest 2010
- Participating broadcaster: Belarusian Television and Radio Company (BTRC)
- Country: Belarus
- Selection process: Internal selection
- Announcement date: Artist: 25 February 2010; Song: 19 March 2010

Competing entry
- Song: "Butterflies"
- Artist: 3+2 feat. Robert Wells
- Songwriters: Maxim Fadeev; Robert Wells; Malka Chaplin

Placement
- Semi-final result: Qualified (9th, 59 points)
- Final result: 24th, 18 points

Participation chronology

Belarus was represented at the Eurovision Song Contest 2010 with the song "Butterflies", written by Maxim Fadeev, Robert Wells, and Malka Chaplin, and performed by the group 3+2 featuring Robert Wells. The Belarusian participating broadcaster, Belarusian Television and Radio Company (BTRC), internally selected its entry for the contest. Initially, on 25 February 2010, the broadcaster announced the song "Far Away" performed by 3+2 as its entry, however the band opted to withdraw their song and the replacement entry, "Butterflies", was announced on 19 March 2010.

Belarus was drawn to compete in the first semi-final of the Eurovision Song Contest which took place on 25 May 2010. Performing during the show in position 16, "Butterflies" was announced among the top 10 entries of the first semi-final and therefore qualified to compete in the final on 29 May. It was later revealed that Belarus placed ninth out of the 17 participating countries in the semi-final with 59 points. In the final, Belarus performed in position 9 and placed twenty-fourth out of the 25 participating countries, scoring 18 points.

== Background ==
Prior to the 2010 contest, Belarusian Television and Radio Company (BTRC) had participated in the Eurovision Song Contest representing Belarus six times since its first entry in 2004. Its best placing in the contest was sixth, achieved in 2007 with the song "Work Your Magic" performed by Koldun. Following the introduction of semi-finals for the 2004, Belarus had only managed to qualify to the final once. In 2009, "Eyes That Never Lie" performed by Petr Elfimov failed to qualify to the final.

As part of its duties as participating broadcaster, BTRC organises the selection of its entry in the Eurovision Song Contest and broadcasts the event in the country. Since 2004, the broadcaster has organised a national final in order to choose its entry. However, BTRC announced that its 2010 entry would be selected via an internal selection.

== Before Eurovision ==
=== Attempt of broadcaster takeover and ONT participation ===
Shortly after the Eurovision Song Contest 2009 where BTRC failed to qualify to the final, Belarusian president Alexander Lukashenko expressed his dissatisfaction over the broadcaster organisation. He also expressed his frustrations over divisions within the team and suggested that broadcaster All-National TV (ONT) should take over as the Belarusian participating broadcaster in the contest.

On 31 July 2009, ONT launched the national final Song for Eurovision, which would result in a winning song to be performed by an internally selected male soloist or a group of six female soloists under the name Nezamuzhem at the Eurovision Song Contest 2010. A song submission period was also opened on where composers were able to submit their songs in English to the broadcaster until 1 October 2009. However, information on the national final had been completely removed from ONT's official website in September 2009 as original plans of "a female band selected through castings hadn't really worked out", and that the broadcaster did not have the right to participate in the contest due to not having EBU membership. ONT also removed all Eurovision references from its website as it had no right to use the "Eurovision" brand as it was not an EBU member, which would lead to legal action by the EBU if continued. EBU Eurovision director Bjørn Erichsen stated on 18 September 2009 during his visit to Minsk that ONT's application for full active EBU membership would be considered only in December 2009 after the application deadline for the Eurovision Song Contest 2010, therefore BTRC as only EBU member in the country should submit a formal application to participate in the 2010 contest with the two broadcasters then making a decision if ONT becomes a member of the union.

Logo of the second ONT selection Musical Court

ONT announced on 29 October 2009 that it would collaborate with BTRC in order to select the Belarusian entry. The broadcaster also launched the national final Musical Court which consisted of six shows: five semi-finals held between 20 November 2009 and 18 December 2009, and a final on 26 December 2009. Twenty-five songs were selected from the submissions received and five were performed in each semi-final by participants of the project New Voices of Belarus. Two songs qualified to the final from each semi-final with one selected by jury members made up of music professionals and one selected by a public televote from the remaining songs. The ten qualifying songs were performed by professional artists in the final and regional televoting selected "Don't Play in Love" performed by Artem Mihalenko as the winner. A second selection stage was planned to take place in February 2010 but was later cancelled after ONT's application for EBU membership was rejected. The broadcaster later stated that Musical Court was "not necessarily" a Eurovision national final but was instead intended "to choose songs to represent the country in any international competitions".

=== Internal selection ===
BTRC announced in January 2010 that it would internally select its entry for the 2010 contest. On 29 January 2010, a submission period was opened on where artists and composers were able to submit their applications and entries to the broadcaster until 15 February 2010. At the closing of the deadline, 41 entries were received by the broadcaster. Among the artists that had submitted entries were Alexandra Gaiduk, Alexandra Zakharik, Alyona Lanskaya, Bullet, Dali, Elena Grishanova, Elaine Hirti, Gunesh, Ivan Buslai, Litesound, NHS, Nina Bogdanova, Rosana Brown and Sonika.

A jury panel consisting of representatives of BTRC, ONT, and CTV was tasked with evaluating the received entries and "Far Away" performed by the group 3+2 was announced as the Belarusian entry for the Eurovision Song Contest 2010 on 25 February 2010; "How Can It Be?" performed by Aleks was also announced as the backup entry in the event of the group being unable to participate. 3+2 and the song, which was written by Leonid Shirin and Yuriy Vaschuk, had previously participated in ONT's Musical Court finishing second. Among the members of the band was the winner of Musical Court Artem Mihalenko.

=== Song replacement ===
On 19 March 2010, BTRC announced that "Far Away" had been withdrawn from the contest and replaced by the song "Butterflies", which was written by Maxim Fadeev, Robert Wells and Malka Chaplin. Fadeev had previously composed the 2004 and 2007 Russian Eurovision entries.

== At Eurovision ==
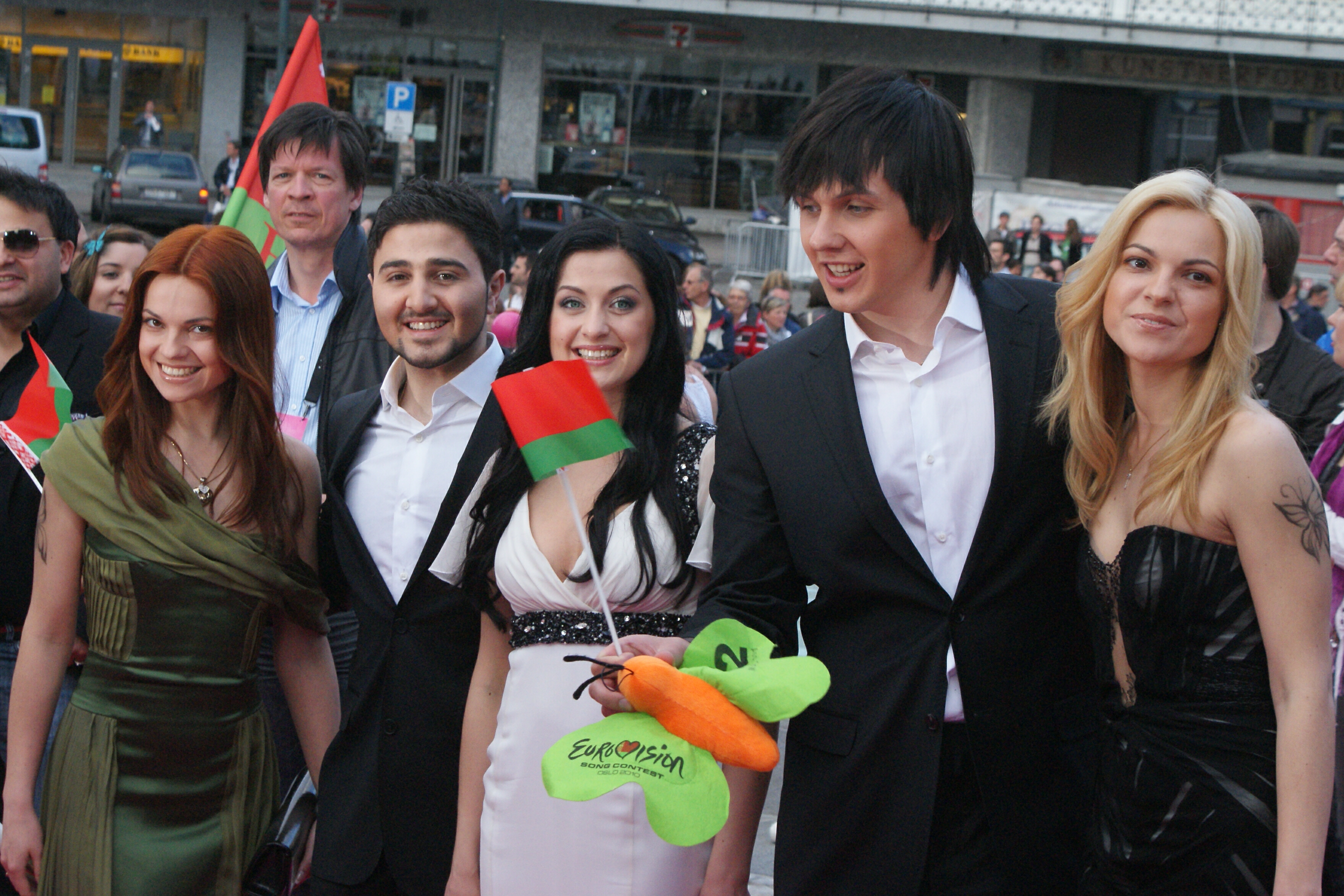
3+2 at the Eurovision Opening Party in Oslo

According to Eurovision rules, all nations with the exceptions of the host country and the "Big Four" (France, Germany, Spain and the United Kingdom) are required to qualify from one of two semi-finals in order to compete for the final; the top ten countries from each semi-final progress to the final. The European Broadcasting Union (EBU) split up the competing countries into six different pots based on voting patterns from previous contests, with countries with favourable voting histories put into the same pot. On 7 February 2010, a special allocation draw was held which placed each country into one of the two semi-finals. Belarus was placed into the first semi-final, to be held on 25 May 2010. The running order for the semi-finals was decided through another draw on 23 March 2010 and Belarus was set to perform in position 16, following the entry from Macedonia and before the entry from Iceland.

The two semi-finals and the final were broadcast in Belarus on the Belarus 1 with commentary by Denis Kurian. BTRC appointed Aleksei Grishin as its spokesperson to announce the Belarusian votes during the final.

=== Semi-final ===
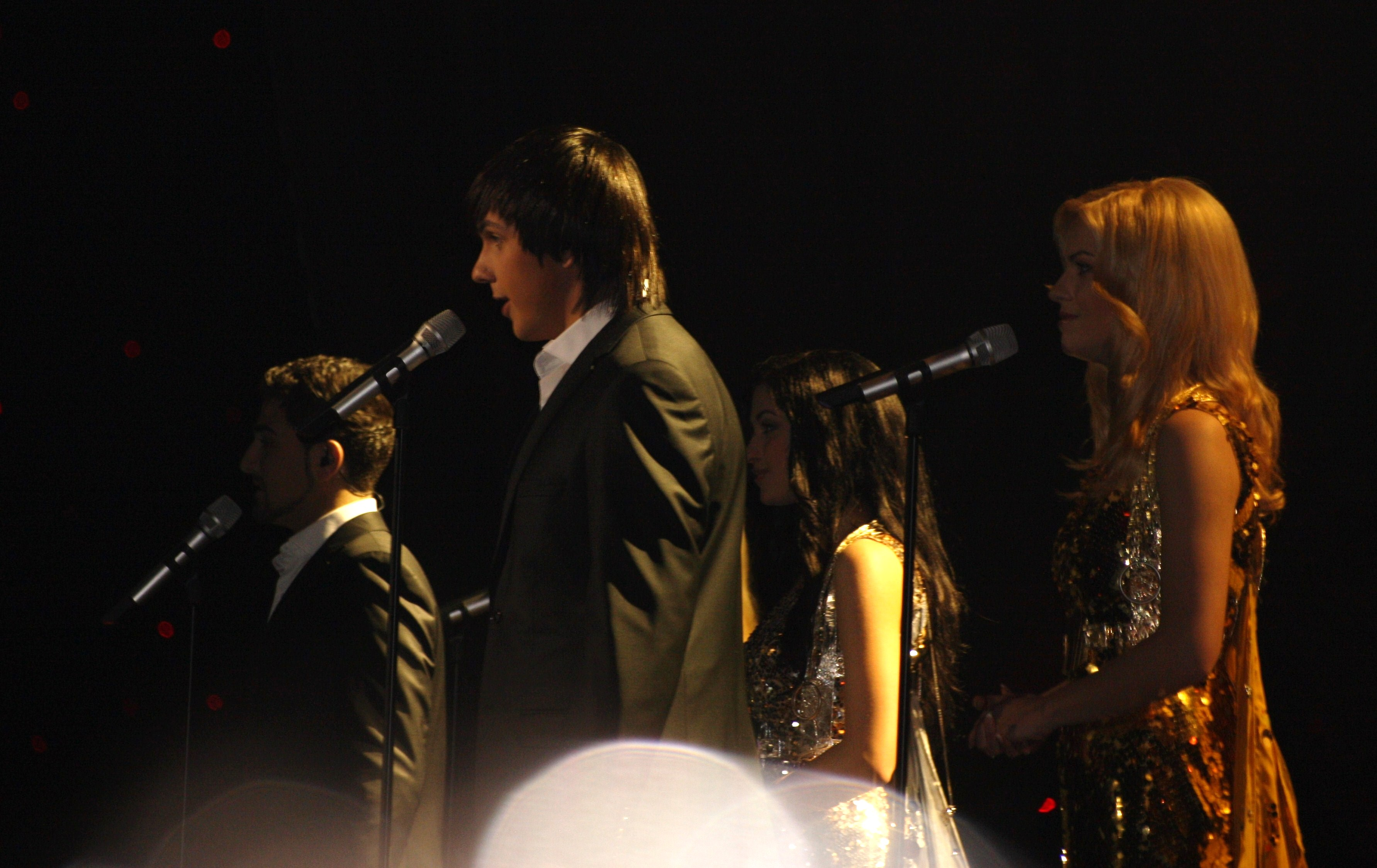
3+2 performing during the Eurovision Song Contest 2010

3+2 took part in technical rehearsals on 17 and 21 May, followed by dress rehearsals on 24 and 25 May. This included the jury show on 24 May where the professional juries of each country watched and voted on the competing entries.

The Belarusian performance featured 3+2 performing on stage with the male members wearing black suits and the female members wearing long dresses in gold, silver and copper colours with attached butterfly wings that appear during the performance. Co-composer of the song Robert Wells, who did not appear until the dress rehearsals, was also on stage playing a white piano. The stage colours were dark with spotlights on the band members, and the black curtains were raised during the performance which revealed a starry background with red lights.

At the end of the show, Belarus was announced as having finished in the top 10 and subsequently qualifying for the grand final. It was later revealed that Belarus placed ninth in the semi-final, receiving a total of 59 points.

=== Final ===
Shortly after the first semi-final, a winners' press conference was held for the ten qualifying countries. As part of this press conference, the qualifying artists took part in a draw to determine the running order for the grand final. This draw was done in the order the countries appeared in the semi-final running order. Belarus was drawn to perform in position 9, following the entry from Serbia and before the entry from Ireland.

3+2 and Robert Wells once again took part in dress rehearsals on 28 and 29 May before the final, including the jury final where the professional juries cast their final votes before the live show. 3+2 and Robert Wells performed a repeat of their semi-final performance during the final on 29 May. Belarus placed twenty-fourth in the final, scoring 18 points.

=== Voting ===
Voting during the three shows involved each country awarding points from 1–8, 10 and 12 as determined by a combination of 50% national jury and 50% televoting. Each participating broadcaster assembled a jury of five music industry professionals who were citizens of the country they represent. This jury judged each entry based on: vocal capacity; the stage performance; the song's composition and originality; and the overall impression by the act. In addition, no member of a national jury was permitted to be related in any way to any of the competing acts in such a way that they cannot vote impartially and independently.

Below is a breakdown of points awarded to Belarus and awarded by Belarus in the first semi-final and grand final of the contest. The nation awarded its 12 points to Russia in the semi-final and final of the contest.

==== Points awarded to Belarus ====
Points awarded to Belarus (Semi-final 1)
Score	Country
12 points	Russia
10 points	
8 points	Moldova
7 points	Portugal
6 points	Greece
5 points	Latvia; Macedonia; Malta
4 points	Estonia
3 points	Poland; Slovakia
2 points	
1 point	France

Points awarded to Belarus (Final)
Score	Country
12 points	Georgia
10 points	
8 points	
7 points	
6 points	
5 points	
4 points	
3 points	Moldova
2 points	Russia
1 point	Bulgaria

==== Points awarded by Belarus ====
Points awarded by Belarus (Semi-final 1)
Score	Country
12 points	Russia
10 points	Moldova
8 points	Belgium
7 points	Finland
6 points	Iceland
5 points	Greece
4 points	Bosnia and Herzegovina
3 points	Poland
2 points	Malta
1 point	Estonia

Points awarded by Belarus (Final)
Score	Country
12 points	Russia
10 points	Ukraine
8 points	Israel
7 points	Georgia
6 points	Azerbaijan
5 points	Armenia
4 points	Moldova
3 points	Turkey
2 points	Iceland
1 point	Romania
