= Robert Wells (composer) =

Swedish singer, songwriter and musician (born 1962)

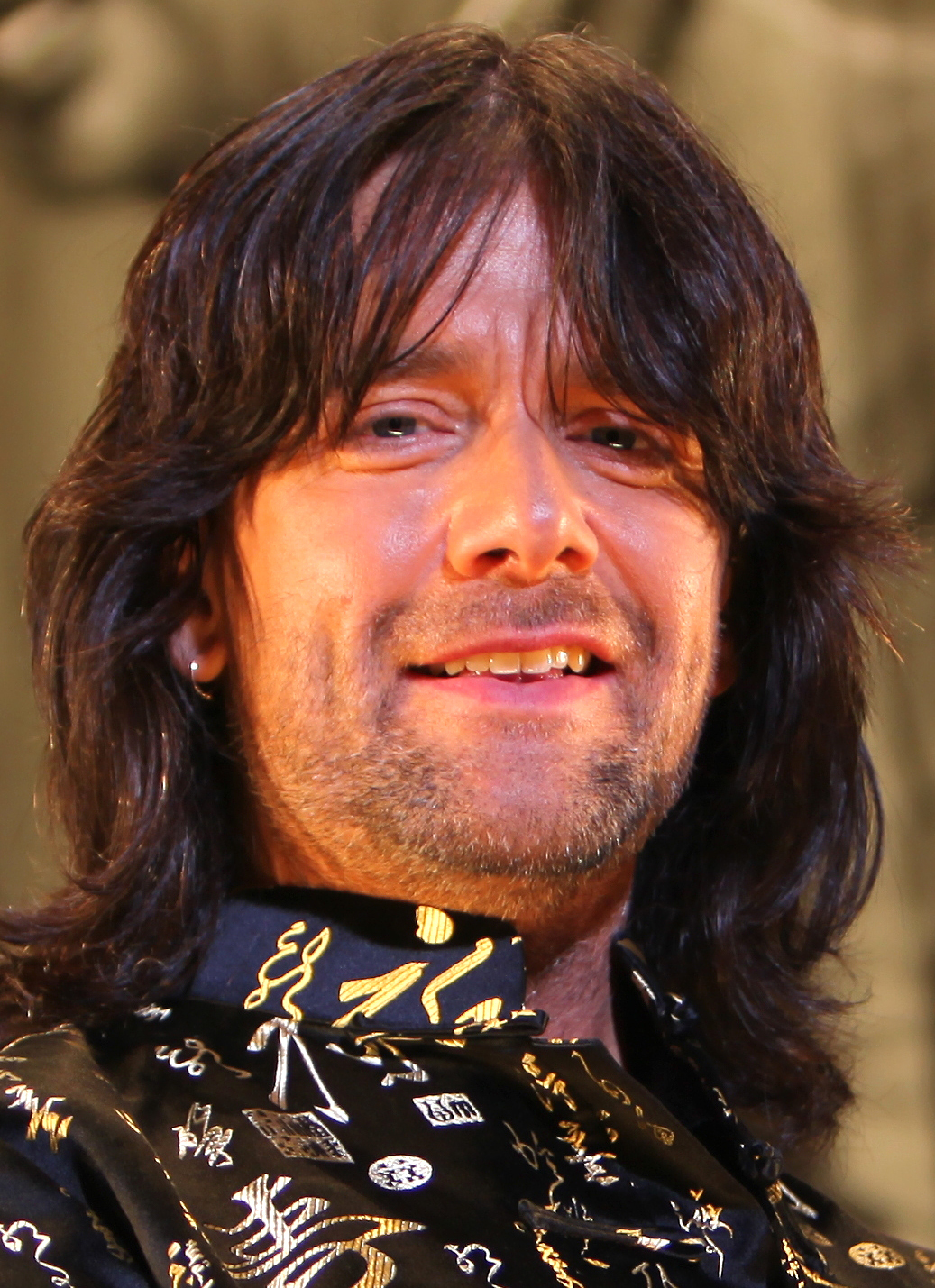
- Wells in 2009

Background information
- Born: Robert Henry Arthur Wells; 7 April 1962 (age 64); Solna, Sweden
- Occupations: Singer; songwriter; musician
- Musical career
- Genres: Rock; pop
- Instruments: Vocals; keyboards
- Years active: 1986–present
- Label: Philips

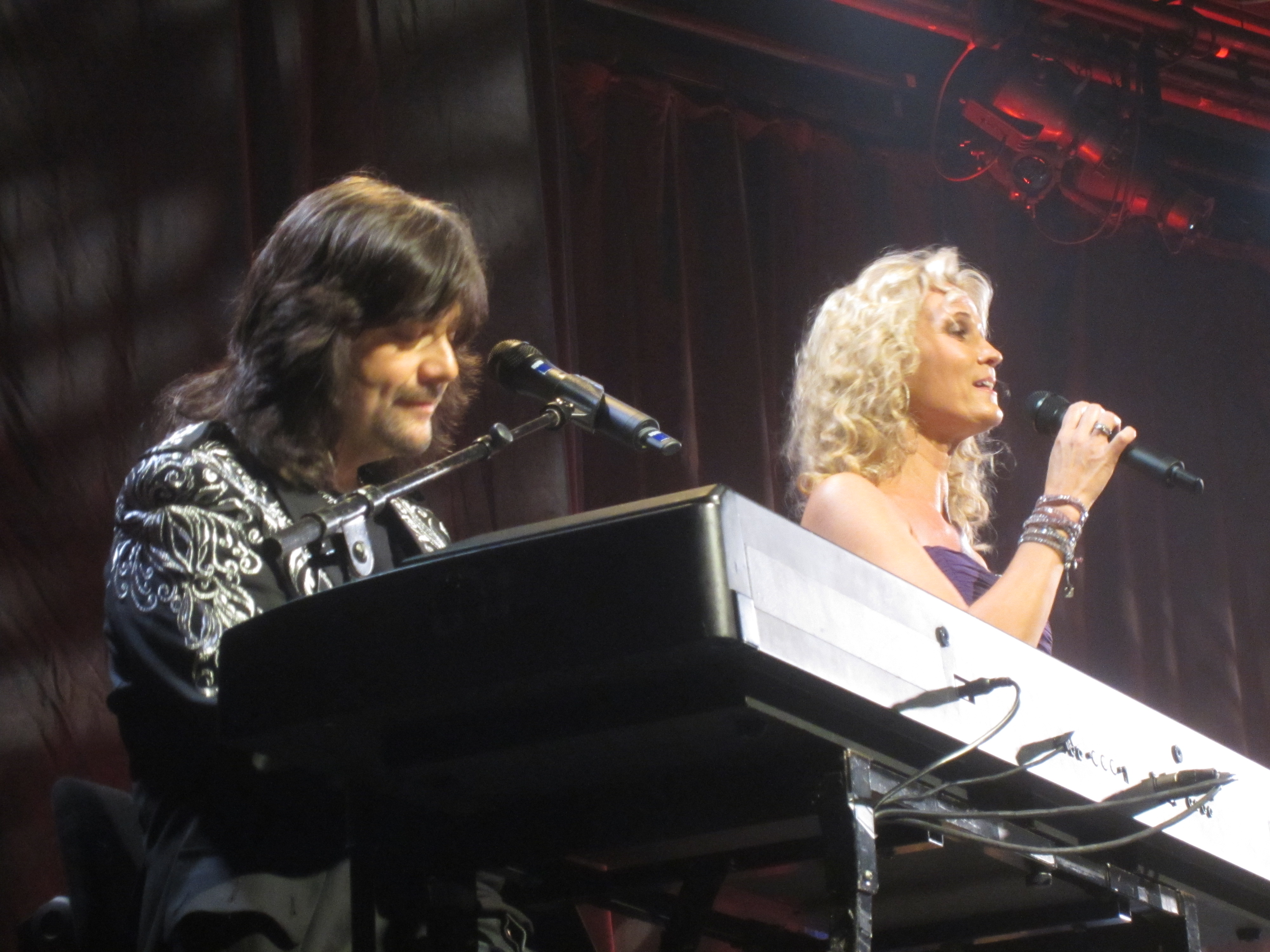
Robert Wells and Maria Sköld (singer) in a commemorative concert for Charlie Norman at the Scalateatern, Stockholm in November 2013.

Robert Henry Arthur Wells (born 7 April 1962) is a Swedish singer, songwriter and musician best known for the musical Rhapsody in Rock, which contains elements of rock, classical and boogie-woogie.

== Early life and career ==
Wells was born in Stockholm. He attended the Adolf Fredrik's Music School in Stockholm at the age of 7 in 1969 and four years later, at the age of 11, became the youngest person ever to attend the Royal Swedish Academy of Music. At the age of 16 in 1978, Wells won two major Swedish talent contests. Wells has also participated twice in Melodifestivalen.

Wells was the musical director of two Swedish television shows. Wells appeared regularly on Så ska det låta, the Swedish version of The Lyrics Board.

Wells's first musical tour was with the Leningrad Orchestra in 1990. Wells's music was chosen as the official television theme music for the 2008 Olympic games in Beijing.

== Eurovision ==
Wells played piano during the Belarus entry at the Eurovision Song Contest 2010 on 25 May performed by 3+2.

== Discography ==
Rhapsody in Rock IV
Sample from Rhapsody in Rock – Completely Live

=== Albums ===
Year	Album	Peak chart positions			Certifications (SWE)
Year	Album	SWE	NOR	DEN	Certifications (SWE)
1987	Robert Wells	12	—	—	
1988	The Way I Feel	—	—	—	
1989	Rhapsody in Rock I	30	—	—	
1990	Rhapsody in Rock II	—	—	—	
1991	Dubbelpianisterna – Hör och Häpna	—	—	—	
1993	Rhapsody in Rock III	—	—	—	
1994	Robert Wells (Finland Special Edition)	—	—	—	
1996	Norman and Wells (with Charlie Norman)	52	—	—	
1998	Rhapsody in Rock Complete	6	—	—	Platinum
2000	Rhapsody in Rock – World Wide Wells	19	—	—	Gold
2000	Jingle Wells	29	—	—	Gold
2001	Rhapsody in Rock – Completely Live	6	—	—	Gold
2002	Väljer sina klassiska favoriter	—	—	—	
2003	Rhapsody in Rock The Complete Collection	1	—	—	Platinum
2004	Rhapsody in Rock – The Anniversary	5	17	18	Gold
2005	Full House Boogie	3	—	—	
2008	The Best of Rhapsody 1998–2008	6	—	—	
2010	Close Up Classics	20	—	—	
2012	Piano Concertos I-1X	—	—	—	
2013	A Tribute to Charlie (Robert Wells Trio)	16	—	—	
2017	Sun Studio Sessions	—	—	—	

"—" denotes releases that did not chart or unknown.

=== Singles ===
Year	Single	Peak chart positions			Certifications (SWE)
Year	Single	SWE	NOR	DEN	Certifications (SWE)
1986	Upp på berget	13	—	—	
1995	Robert Trio	—	—	—	
1997	Spanish Rhapsody	—	—	—	
2000	ROCKARIA	—	—	—	
2003	My Love (with Sofia Källgren)	—	—	—	
2009	Handful of Keys	1	—	—	Gold

=== Videos ===
- 1987: Robert Wells

=== DVDs ===
- 2002: Rhapsody in Rock – The Stadium Tour 2002
- 2004: Rhapsody in Rock – The Anniversary Tour
- 2005: Rhapsody in Rock- The 2005 Summer Tour

== Other works ==
=== Books ===
- 2003: Mitt Liv Som Komphund
- 2019: Blod, Svett & Toner

== Awards and honors ==
- The Charlie Norman Honor Prize, 2011
- H. M. The King's Medal, 8th size with blue ribbon, 2012

== See also ==
- List of Swedish composers

Awards and achievements
Preceded by Petr Elfimov with "Eyes That Never Lie"	Belarus in the Eurovision Song Contest (with 3+2); 2010	Succeeded by Anastasia Vinnikova with "I Love Belarus"
