= Grand Courage =

Russian band

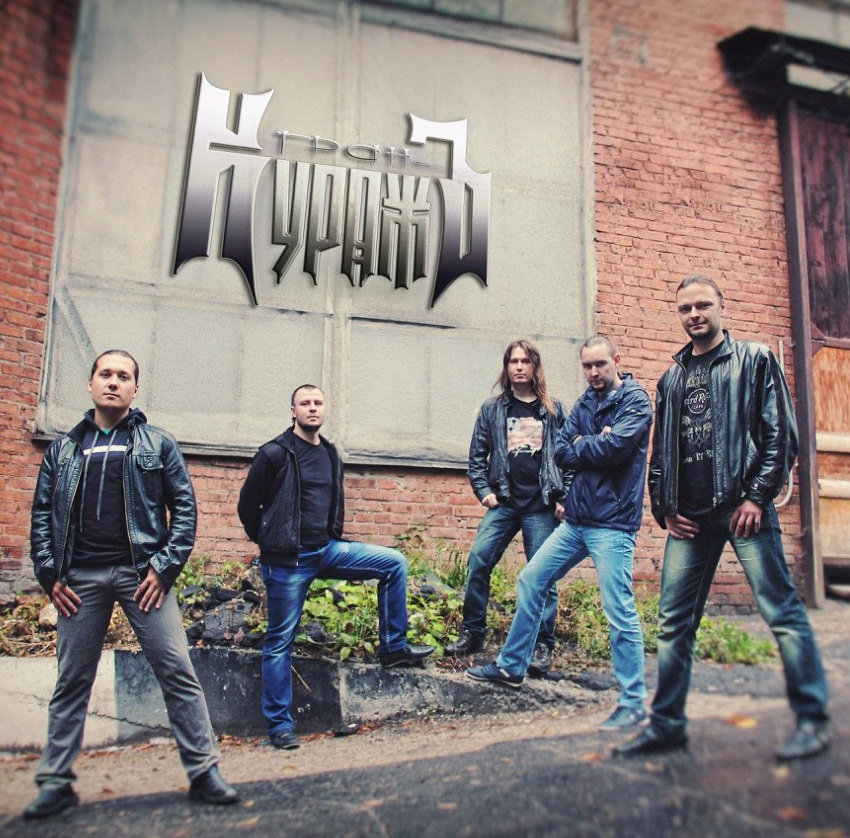

Background information
- Also known as: КуражЪ (Courage) (1999–2007)
- Origin: Russia
- Genres: Heavy metal, Power metal
- Years active: 1999–present
- Labels: CD Maximum; Sound Age; Metalism Records
- Members: Evgeni' Kolchin; Mikhail Bugaev; Pavel Selemenev; Alexey "Zebr" Putilin
- Past members: Mikhail Zhitnyakov

Grand Courage (Russian: Гран-КуражЪ) is a Russian heavy/power metal band that was formed in 1999 in Bronnitsy.

== History ==
The band was founded by Mikhail Bugaev in 1999. At that time the band performed only in Bronnitsy. It began to gain fame only in 2004, when the "Golden lineup" was formed.

In 2005 it won the contest "ProRock" and was a Grand Prix recipient.

On September 20, 2006, the band released its debut album Vechnaya igra.

In 2007, the band's name changed from Courage to Grand Courage.

In 2007 and 2008, Grand Courage performed in the rock festival Slava Rossii (Fame to Russia).

In 2008, the band released its second album Novoy nadezhdy svet...

On May 9, 2010, the band released its first single, "Na voyne" (Into the War), dedicated to the 65th anniversary of the 1945 victory over Nazi Germany. It is available for free download on their website.

On July 11, 2010, the band performed in the Russian rock music festival, Nashestvie. It performed in the alternative scene with bands such as Epidemia, Master, Mavrin, Catharsis, Arda, and Slot.

In the Spring of 2011, Grand Courage began the recording of its third full-length album.

On September 16, 2011, Grand Courage vocalist Mikhail Zhitnyakov was announced on Nashe Radio as the new vocalist for the band Aria.

In February 2012 Zhitnyakov officially left Grand Courage, leaving the band seeking a new frontman. This announcement was made after the band finished recording the new album, and all the vocal parts were recorded with Zhitnyakov.

On May 28, 2012, the third album Serdtsa v Atlantide was released. On September 15, the band organized a concert which featured four vocalists: Sergey Sergeev, Alexander Cap, Andrey Nefyodov and Mikhail Nakhimovich. It was not certain if one of these would become the new frontman.

In July 2013, it was announced that the band had found a new frontman, but his identity remained a secret.

== Style and lyrical themes ==
Grand Courage's style mostly resembles heavy metal with elements of power metal.

Their songs contain themes such as human emotions (love, sorrow, hate, etc.), relationships, mythology, history, war, politics, and patriotism. Mikhail Bugaev, the band's primary songwriter, often draws inspiration from literature and films. For example, the song "Teoriya khaosa" ("Теория Хаоса", "Theory of Chaos") is based on the movie The Butterfly Effect. War as a theme appears in songs like "Te, kogo ryadom net" ("Те, кого рядом нет", "Those Who Are Not Around"), a song dedicated to those who died in the Soviet–Afghan War), and "Na voyne" ("На войне", "At War"), a song in memory of the veterans of World War II.

== Band members ==
Current members

- Mikhail Bugaev – guitar, keyboards, bandleader, songwriter (1999–present)
- Pavel Selemenev – bass (2001–present)
- Alexey "Zebr" Putilin – drums (2003–present)
- Yuriy Bobyryov – guitar, backing vocals (2012–present)

Former members

- Mikhail Zhitnyakov – lead vocals (2004–2012)
- Evgeni' Kolchin – lead vocals (2013–2018)
- Petr Elfimov lead vocals (2018-2026)
- Evgeniy Komarov – keyboards (1999–2010)
- Sergey Volkov – drums (1999-2003)
- Ravshan "Robson" Muhtarov – bass guitar, lead vocals (1999–2002)

Timeline

== Discography ==
Albums

- Vechnaya igra ("Вечная игра", "Eternal Game") (2006)
- Novoy nadezhdy svet... ("Новой надежды свет", "The Light of New Hope...") (2008)
- Serdtsa v Atlantide ("Сердца в Атлантиде", "Hearts in Atlantis") (2012)
- Zhit' kak nikto drugoy ("Жить как никто другой", Live Like No One Else) (2016)

Extended plays

- "Eto ne igra" ("Это не игра", It's Not a Game) (2014)

Singles

- "Na voyne" ("На войне", At War) (2010)
- "Lod i plamya" ("Лёд и пламя", "Ice & Fire") (2013)

Compilations

- Demos & Rares (2004-2010) (2017)
