= Handful of Keys (Robert Wells song) =

Single by Robert Wells
- Released: 2009
- Recorded: 2009
- Songwriter(s): Robert Wells

Handful of Keys is a song written and performed by Swedish pianist and composer Robert Wells. It was released in Sweden and entered the Swedish Singles Chart straight in at #1 on 17 July 2009, where it stayed for 1 week.

== Charts ==
=== Weekly charts ===
Chart (2009)	Peak position
Sweden (Sverigetopplistan)	1

=== Year-end charts ===
Chart (2009)	Position
Sweden (Sverigetopplistan)	74
