= Alena and Ninel Karpovich =

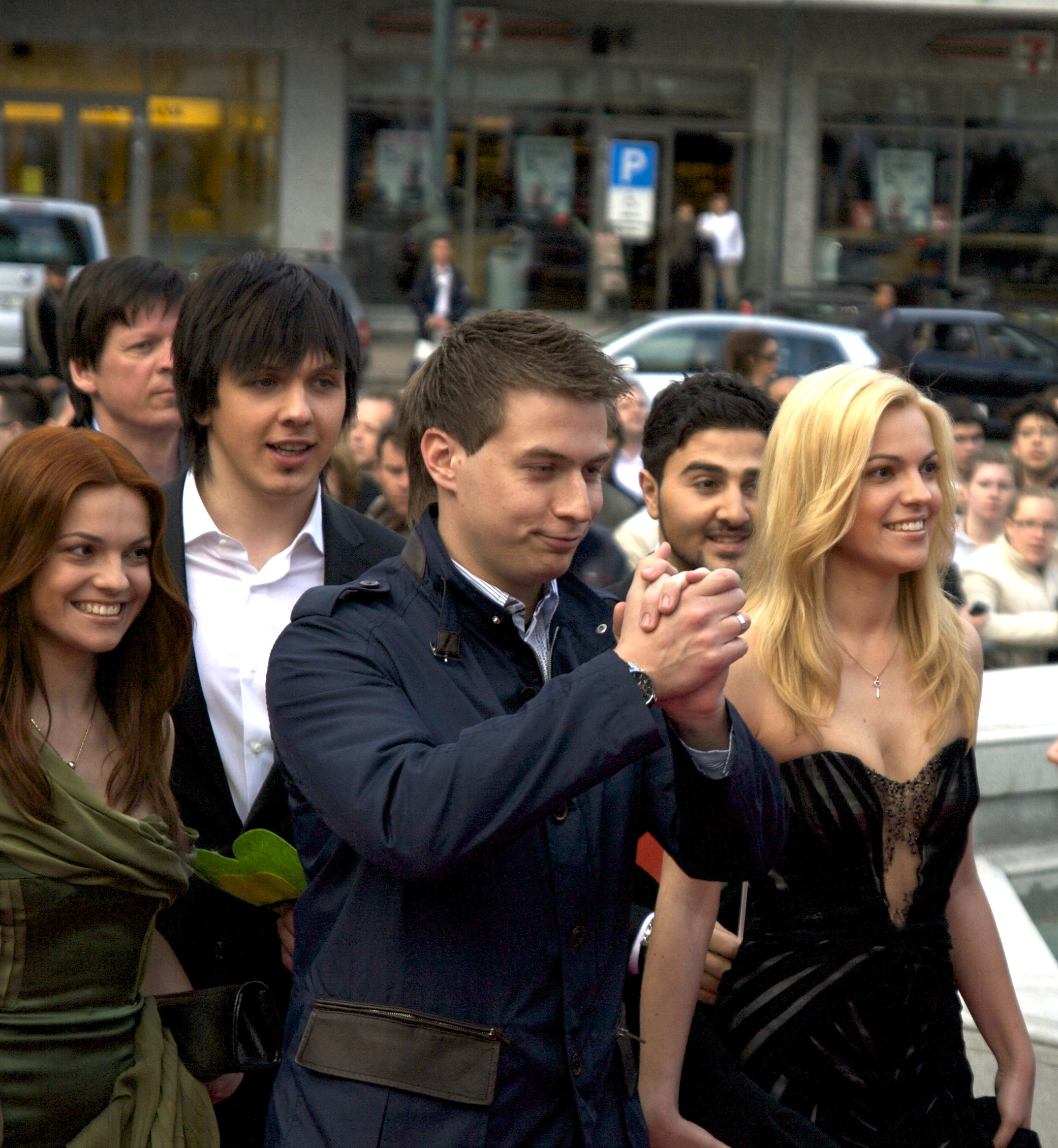
- Alena (left) and Ninel (right) Karpovich in Oslo, 23 May 2010

Background information
- Born: Alena Karpovich; Ninel Karpovich; 3 March 1985 (age 41)
- Origin: Minsk, Belarus
- Genres: Pop, soul
- Occupation: Singers
- Years active: 2009–present

Alena and Ninel Karpovich (Belarusian: Алёна Карповіч, Нінэль Карповіч; born on 3 March 1985 in Minsk, Byelorussian SSR, USSR) are a Belarusian twin sister musical duo that are current members of the pop group 3+2 that represented Belarus in the Eurovision Song Contest 2010 in Oslo. They have both hosted the Belarusian national lottery show together for a year. The twins have also released a few music singles as a musical duo. They were finalists in the television talent show New Voices of Belarus, the Belarusian version of Star Factory, and got work in the main state orchestra of Belarus. During the television show TV project Musical Court the twins became two of the members of the pop group 3+2 that will represent Belarus in the Eurovision on 25 May 2010. The sisters also had their own entry in the Belarus pre-selection heats that was held previously.
