= Petr Elfimov =

Belarusian singer

Petr Elfimov Пётр Елфімаў
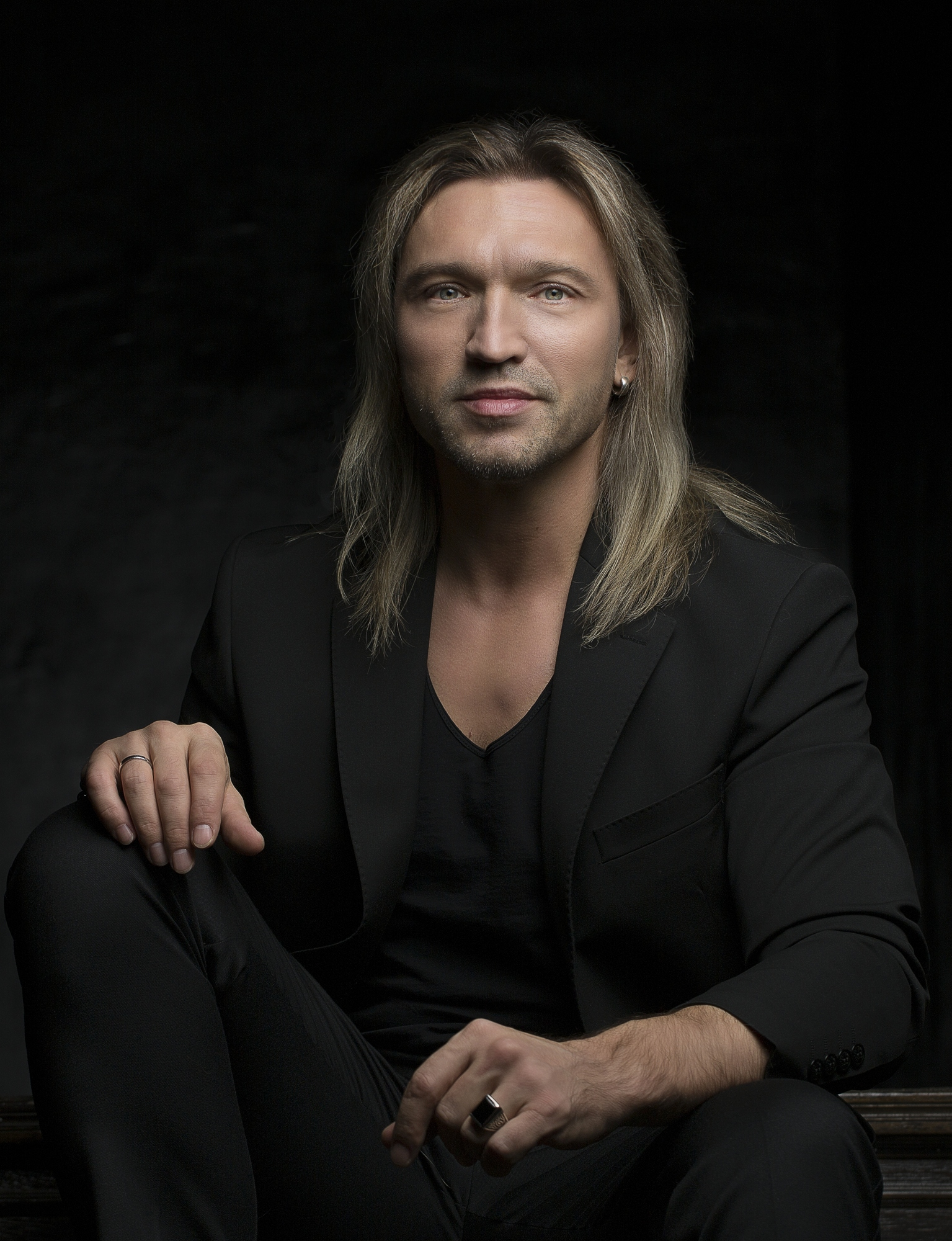
- Photo: Ilya Benton

Background information
- Born: 15 February 1980 (age 46)
- Origin: Mogilev, Byelorussian SSR, USSR
- Genres: Rock, pop, classic
- Occupations: Singer, songwriter, arranger, music producer, actor
- Instruments: Vocal, guitar, keyboard
- Years active: 1986–present
- Website: https://t.me/petrelfimov

Petr Petrovich Elfimov (Belarusian: Пётр Елфімаў, Pyotr Yelfimaŭ; born 15 February 1980) is a Belarusian singer, musician, songwriter and arranger, music producer, actor. Outside of Belarus, he is best known for representing his country at the Eurovision Song Contest 2009 held in Moscow.

He holds a title of Master of Art Criticism and serves as associate professor in the Department of Variety and Jazz Singing at Institute of Modern Art. He's the voice and the face of the project ELFIMOV, as well as groups Grand Courage and METHEORA.

== Biography ==
He was the Grand Prix winner of the 2004 Slavianski Bazaar in Vitebsk. From 1999 to 2007 Pyotr played the student game KVN. He appeared for two teams, who in different years became KVN's Major League Champions: BGU (Minsk), Champions in 1999 and 2001; and RUDN (Moscow), with whom he won the Super Cup with them in 2007 in Sochi.

On January 19, 2009, he won Eurofest 2009, with the rock song Eyes That Never Lie, and thus gained the right to represent Belarus in the Eurovision Song Contest 2009. He competed in the first semi-final of the event, on 12 May 2009. Finishing 13th out of 18 acts in the semi-final, he failed to qualify to the final on 16 May.

In 2018, Elfimov joined Heavy metal band Grand Courage as vocalist.

In 2019, Petr Elfimov was the opening singer for 2019 European Games held in Minsk, Belarus along with Alyona Lanskaja.

== Discography ==
=== Solo albums ===
Name	Date
Я хочу	2006
Колокола	2007
С новым рожденьем	2009
Книга откровений	2012

=== EP and singles ===
Name	Date
EP Eyes that never lie	2009
single Где-то не со мной	2011
EP Главная роль	2015
single Полукровки	2015
single Новогодний рок-н-ролл	2018
single Остановись	2018
single Помни меня	2023
single Тихая гавань	2024
single Ступени	2024
single Я с тобой	2025
single Вещий	2025
EP Новая глава	2026

=== Live-albums ===
Name	Date
Квартирник у Маргулиса (Live NTV, Moscow)	2025

=== As part of the group Grand Courage ===
Studio albums

Name	Date
Эпохи, герои и судьбы	2021
Легенды мира из огня	2024

EP и синглы

Название	Год
single Кто?	2018
single Волна	2018
single Адреналин	2018
single За мечтой	2020
single Без потерь	2020
single Город-призрак	2021
EP Эйфория	2022
EP Скоморох	2023
single Станем вместе	2024
single Лети	2024
single Дождь	2025
EP Меланхолия	2025
single Нити в узоре миров	2026

Live albums

Name	Date
IX жизней	2022
Квартирник у Маргулиса (Live NTV, Moscow)	2025

=== As part of the group METHEORA ===
Name	Date
“Мёртвые сны”	2023
“ЭХО”	2023
“Чёрный снег”	2024
“Города”	2024
“The Rumbling” (cover)	2025
“Ангелы молчат” (cover)	2025
“Время”	2025

=== Guest participation ===
2005–2009

Song	Author	Album	Date
“Страна льдов”	Staya	Страна льдов	2005
“Непобёжденный судьбой”	Staya	Страна льдов	2005
“Прыгнуть в пустоту”	Staya	Страна льдов	2005
“Не забудь мою печаль”	Staya	Страна льдов	2005
“Маю надзею”	PITBUL	Маю надзею	2006
“Новый день”	Irina Dorofeeva	Новый день	2008
“Вороны”	Chisty Golos	Вороны	2009

2011–2014

	Song	Author	Album	Date
“Для неё”	Fanem	Для неё	2011	
“Пять минут — исповедь палача”	Epoha	Молот ведьм	2012	
“Молот ведьм”	Epoha	Молот ведьм	2012	
“Drive”	Euphoria	Drive	2013	
“Дует ветер ледяной”	Epidemia	Сокровище Энии	2014	
“Под огнём”	Aillion	Под огнём	2014	
“Отступник”	Sad gryoz	Шизофрения	2014	

2015

Song	Author	Album
“Тишина”	Skrizhali	Назад дороги нет
“Двое”	Skrizhali	Назад дороги нет
“Без слов”	Skrizhali	Назад дороги нет
“Война миров”	Aillion	Война миров
“Под огнём”	Aillion	Война миров
“Зверь”	Aillion	Война миров
“Пустые слова”	Aillion	Война миров
“Последний сон”	Aillion	Война миров
“Солнце свободы”	Aillion	Война миров
“Да и нет”	Aillion	Война миров
“Яд”	Aillion	Война миров
“Мертвый рай”	Aillion	Война миров
“If you are happy”	FORCES UNITED	II
“Мама”	Valery Golovko	Мама
“Исповедь пианиста”	Valery Golovko	Мама
“Исповедь поэта”	Valery Golovko	Мама
“Дай мне шанс”	Valery Golovko	Мама
“К Тамаре”	Valery Golovko	Мама
“Старый мотив”	Valery Golovko	Мама
“Возьми протянутую руку”	Valery Golovko	Мама
“United Force”	FORCES UNITED	III
“Break us”	Ethereal Dawn	The Moonlight of Gloom
“Две грозы-2”	VIKONT	Арийская Русь. Часть 2
“Is This the End?”	FORCES UNITED	IV

2016

Song	Author	Album
“Lies and Truth”	NEWLEVEL	Kenopsia
“Or am I dreaming”	FORCES UNITED	Best&Rares
“Шаг навстречу”	Olga Kolesnikova	Шаг навстречу
“Очарованные грустью”	Sphinx & MARGENTA	Очарованные грустью
“Вымоленный дождь”	Sphinx & MARGENTA	Очарованные грустью
“All or nothing”	FORCES UNITED	Power Subunit
“Be careful what you wish for”	FORCES UNITED	Power Subunit
“А может это сон?”	FORCES UNITED	Ансамбль ФОРСЭЗ ЮНАЙТЭД
“Бог”	KALMAN	Бог

2017

Song	Author	Album
“Nothing's Perfect”	FORCES UNITED	V
“Я и ТЫ”	Power Tale	Семь подземных королей
“Time to go”	FORCES UNITED	VI
“Волны”	Alekseevskaya ploshad'	Всё повторится вновь
“Увертюра” (choir)	FORCES UNITED	rock opera Мавзолей
“Великая страна” (choir)	FORCES UNITED	rock opera Мавзолей
“Братья ордена света”	FORCES UNITED	rock opera Мавзолей
“Встань же, грозный великан!”	FORCES UNITED	rock opera Мавзолей
“Пробуждение мумии”	FORCES UNITED	rock opera Мавзолей
“Механическое сердце”	FORCES UNITED	rock opera Мавзолей
“Новый человек”	FORCES UNITED	rock opera Мавзолей
“Любовь в Мавзолее”	FORCES UNITED	rock opera Мавзолей
“Поплывём на дальний берег”	FORCES UNITED	rock opera Мавзолей
“Прощание”	FORCES UNITED	rock opera Мавзолей
“Чистое сердце”	FORCES UNITED	rock opera Мавзолей
“Позвольте умереть...” (choir)	FORCES UNITED	rock opera Мавзолей
“Уйди, измученный кумир!” (choir)	FORCES UNITED	rock opera Мавзолей

2018

Song	Author	Album
“Listen to hear”	FORCES UNITED	VII
“Awesome Threesome”	FORCES UNITED	ДЕТЯМ
“Был тогда другим наш мир (Гимн рокерам 80-х!)”	FORCES UNITED	ДЕТЯМ
“Спаси и храни”	Gasnet svet	IN TENEBRIS
“Onyx”	ORSHED	Onyx
“Выбор есть!”	Epidemia	Легенда Ксентарона
“Стрела Судьбы”	Epidemia	Легенда Ксентарона
“Музыкальный магазин”	Kolizey	Два диска
“Книга судьбы”	Kolizey	Два диска
“Голоса былого”	Kolizey	Два диска
“Тебе не убежать”	Kolizey	Два диска
“Граница”	SuMax records	Граница
“Легион”	MISSIYA	Легион
“Багровость облаков”	MARGENTA	rock opera Окситания
“Небо мне доверяет”	MARGENTA	rock opera Окситания
“Прощай, Каркассон”	MARGENTA	rock opera Окситания
“Мы — совершенные”	MARGENTA	rock opera Окситания
“Совершенные (Поцелуй мира)”	MARGENTA	rock opera Окситания
“Финал”	MARGENTA	rock opera Окситания
“One and only”	FORCES UNITED	Andy Vortex
“Рулетка”	Aillion	Эра чёрных зеркал
“Живой”	Aillion	Эра чёрных зеркал
“Тени играют”	Aillion	Эра чёрных зеркал

2019

Song	Author	Album
“Полина”	Valery Golovko	Полина
“Зеркало судьбы”	CATHARSIS	Зеркало судьбы
“Невесомость”	CATHARSIS	Зеркало судьбы
“Второй шанс”	Power Tale	Огненный Бог Марранов
“Падший в рай”	Power Tale	Огненный Бог Марранов
“Ведомый зарёй”	Power Tale	Огненный Бог Марранов
“Сталь и кровь”	Power Tale	Огненный Бог Марранов
“Гимн свободы”	Power Tale	Огненный Бог Марранов
“Царь и сын его Иван”	FORCES UNITED	GOLD
“Чёрная быль”	FORCES UNITED	GOLD
“Smoke on the water” (cover)	StoneHand	Stone Purple

2020

Song	Author	Album
“Ария”	CRASH TEST	Ария
“Долгий путь домой”	StoneHand	Дорожный альбом
“Наш дом — земля”	LIVE HELP	Наш дом — земля
“Лагерта”	MARGENTA & CATHARSIS	Алый король
“Аве, Вавилов!”	FORCES UNITED	ПРЕДАНИЯ о ПРЕДАННЫХ и ПРЕДАТЕЛЯХ. 1 ЧАСТЬ
“Обитаемый остров”	FORCES UNITED	Миры братьев Стругацких
“Ты един, ты один”	ASPHERIX	Падшие
“Падший”	ASPHERIX	Падшие
“Предатель”	ASPHERIX	Падшие
“Небесное воинство”	ASPHERIX	Падшие
“Ты видишь”	ASPHERIX	Падшие
“A Life to learn”	FORCES UNITED	Heart

2021

Song	Author	Album
“8000 метров”	Eskalada	Легион
“Not a Saint!”	Defiant	No more pain
“Золото и кровь”	Gasnet svet	Aurum et Sanguinem
“Время”	SuMax records	Время
“Гарри Поттер — детство сердца и беда!”	MARGENTA	Маги и маглы
“На смерть профессора Дамблдора. Реквием”	MARGENTA	Маги и маглы
“Always!”	MARGENTA	Маги и маглы
“Албанский лес (Эффект Боггарта)”	MARGENTA	Маги и маглы
“На передовой”	FORCES UNITED	На передовой
“Чарли и шоколадная фабрика”	FORCES UNITED	HITS FROM METAL MUSICALS. 1 ЧАСТЬ
“Bonus Track”	FORCES UNITED	HITS FROM METAL MUSICALS. 1 ЧАСТЬ
“Сёстры”	DRAGONSPELL	Сёстры
“Письмо Ведьмаку”	Epidemia	Призраки и тени
“Палач”	FORCES UNITED	ПРЕДАНИЯ о ПРЕДАННЫХ и ПРЕДАТЕЛЯХ. 2 ЧАСТЬ
“Осколки розовых очков”	FORCES UNITED	ПРЕДАНИЯ о ПРЕДАННЫХ и ПРЕДАТЕЛЯХ. 2 ЧАСТЬ
“Балтийский шторм”	FORCES UNITED	ПРЕДАНИЯ о ПРЕДАННЫХ и ПРЕДАТЕЛЯХ. 2 ЧАСТЬ
“Свет надежды”	DRAGONSPELL	Свет надежды
“Новый новый год”	Bolshoe spasibo	Новый новый год
“Лучше, чем вчера”	Gioconda	Лучше, чем вчера

2022

Song	Author	Album
“Новое кино”	Revolucia	Первый
“Сквозь горизонт”	Above the stars	Dawn of the New Day
“Верь”	APOTOM	Верь
“Скарабей”	Golosa	Скарабей
“Заря”	Golosa	Скарабей
“Два крыла”	Golosa	Скарабей
“Echo”	Somewhere Place	Pinsnowlande
“Straight across the sea”	Somewhere Place	Pinsnowlande
“Моя Земля”	Golosa	Плач Сирин
“Письмо без слов”	SuMax records	Письмо без слов
“Четыре поросёнка и Серый член ЦК”	FORCES UNITED	HITS FROM METAL MUSICALS. 2 ЧАСТЬ
“Звёздный сон любви”	VIA Troya	Звёздный сон любви
“Тёмная башня”	MARGENTA	Сон императора
“Песнь о колоколе” (bonus track)	MARGENTA	Сон императора
“Дорога жизни”	FORCES UNITED	Дорога жизни
“Ария простуженного Пьеро”	FORCES UNITED	HITS FROM METAL MUSICALS. 3 ЧАСТЬ

2023

Song	Author	Album
“Здесь и сейчас”	Vitaly Dubinin	Бал-Маскарад. Постскриптум
“Шрамы павших звёзд”	Aleksei Strike	VOODOO PRESS II
“Сто ночей”	DIGIMORTAL	Сто ночей 2023
“Подземный грот”	Gothic Sky	Последние слова покаяния
“Дзякую табе”	FORCES UNITED	GOLDEN BALLADS
“Дом разбитых сердец”	MARGENTA	Прикосновение

2024

Song	Author	Album
“Только ты”	SKATES	Только ты
“После поцелуя неба”	MONOCAST	Детства край
“Кто спас мир?”	FORCES UNITED	Железный занавес
“Презрев успех”	FORCES UNITED	Железный занавес
“Баллада о корабле”	Soundtrack to the book series “Прядущая”	Баллада о корабле
“Олимпиада — 80”	FORCES UNITED	FORCES OF DAVID
“Миллион лет до нашей эры”	FORCES UNITED	FORCES OF DAVID
“Светлый мир”	ASPHERIX	Светлый мир
“В её мечтах — Дракон”	Save my name	В её мечтах — Дракон

2025

Song	Author	Album
“Может быть”	Gioconda	Может быть
“Одинокие жизни”	AVANTGARDE	Одинокие жизни
“По ту сторону смерти”	Gioconda	По ту сторону смерти
“В неведомой стране”	Epidemia	Где сходятся миры
“Память”	Aria	Когда настанет завтра
“Всё для любви”	AMALGAMA	Всё для любви

2026

Song	Author	Album
“Берег мёртвых деревьев”	Angel-Hranitel'	Знахарь: Путь крови
“И всюду тьма”	Angel-Hranitel'	Знахарь: Путь крови

=== Tributes ===
Song	Author	Album	Date
“Без тебя”	Aria	Internet Tribute to Ария. XXV. Дай руку мне	2011
“Бесы”	Aria	Internet Tribute to Ария. XXV. Дай руку мне	2011
“Burning In Hell”	Master	A Tribute To Мастер. XXV	2013
“Пока Боги спят”	Mavrin	Tribute To Маврин. Fifteen Years	2013
“Далёкая звезда”	August	Tribute to Август 33	2016
“Kolizey”	Aria	Симфония Холстинина	2018
“Последний закат”	Aria	Симфония Холстинина	2018
“Патриот”	Aria	Симфония Холстинина	2018
“Вампир”	Aria	Симфония Холстинина	2018

Awards and achievements
Preceded by Ruslan Alekhno with "Hasta la Vista"	Belarus in the Eurovision Song Contest; 2009	Succeeded by 3+2 feat. Robert Wells with "Butterflies"
