= Koludan =

Koludan كلودان
- Village
- Location within Iran
- Coordinates: 32°30′28″N 51°53′02″E
- Country: Iran
- Province: Isfahan
- County: Isfahan
- Bakhsh: Central
- Rural District: Baraan-e Jonubi

Population (2006)
  - Total: 70
- Time zone: UTC+3:30 (IRST)
  - Summer (DST): UTC+4:30 (IRDT)

Koludan (Persian: كلودان, also Romanized as Kolūdān; also known as Kaldūn, Koldūn, Kūldān, and Kuldūn) is a village in Baraan-e Jonubi Rural District, in the Central District of Isfahan County, Isfahan Province, Iran. At the 2006 census, its population was 70, in 16 families.
