= 3+2 (band) =

Belarusian pop group

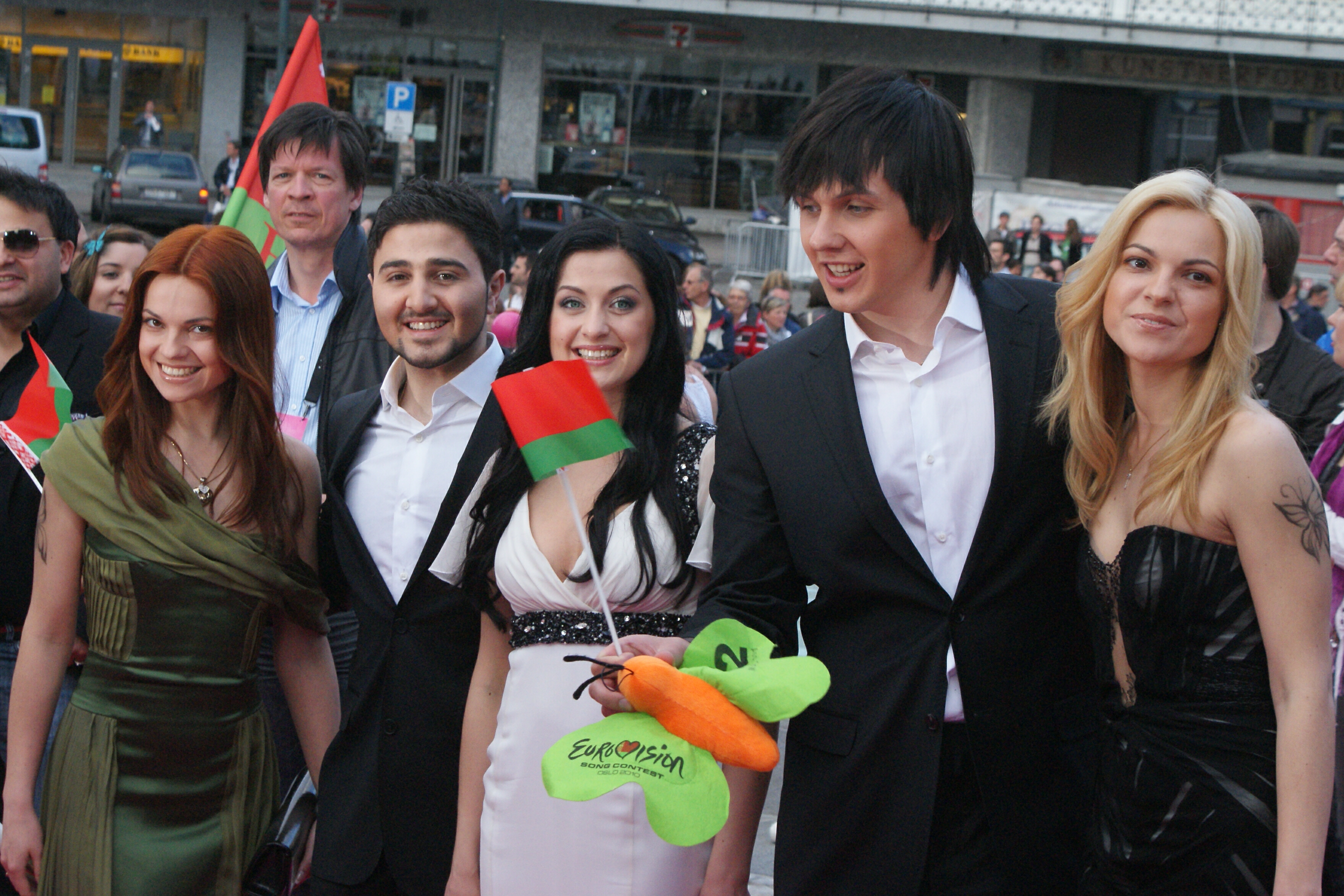
- 3+2

Background information
- Origin: Minsk, Belarus
- Genres: Pop, Soul
- Years active: 2009–2011
- Past members: Elgiazar Farashyan; Yulia Shisko; Artsem Mikhalenka; Alena Karpovich; Ninel Karpovich; Mihail Mikhalenka

3+2 or Three Plus Two (Belarusian: Тры плюс два; Russian: Три плюс два) were a Belarusian pop group that represented Belarus in the Eurovision Song Contest 2010 in Oslo, Norway.

== Formation ==
The band was formed by the Belarusian television channel ONT and the project "New Voices of Belarus" in 2009. All the group members are the finalists of that TV show.

== Eurovision Song Contest 2010 ==
After the victory in the national selection for the Eurovision 2010, public interest has grown rapidly. On 25 February 2010, 3+2 were chosen internally to represent Belarus in the Eurovision Song Contest 2010 with the song "Butterflies", performing in the first semi-final to be held on 25 May 2010.

Songwriters from Belarus and neighbouring countries offered the band their compositions. The producers of 3+2 considered different variants of the song, clips and performance. The band director decided to contact well-known producer and writer Max Fadeev for some conceptual ideas. Within a week he managed to create the full original set for the band. The song Butterflies was written by Max Fadeev, Swedish composer Robert Wells and by Polish poet Malka Chaplin especially for the group. They previously chose to perform "Far Away" at the contest, but changed it to "Butterflies" later due to poor reactions on the internet. Butterflies placed 24th in the grand final with a total of 18 points.

Awards and achievements
Preceded by Petr Elfimov with "Eyes That Never Lie"	Belarus in the Eurovision Song Contest (with Robert Wells); 2010	Succeeded by Anastasia Vinnikova with "I Love Belarus"
