= Litesound =

Belarusian pop rock band

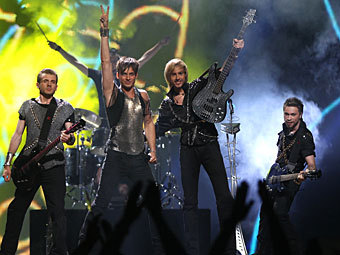
- Litesound at Eurovision Song Contest 2012 in 2012 performing We Are the Heroes

Background information
- Origin: Minsk, Belarus
- Genres: Pop rock
- Years active: 2005–present
- Labels: MediaCube Music, West Records
- Members: Dmitry Karyakin; Vladimir Karyakin; Evgeny Balchuys; Max Bobko
- Past members: Andrey Ravovoy; Mario Gulinsky; Sergey Genko; Alex Kolchin; Ignat Yakovich; Artyom Doronkin; Egor Doronkin; Jacopo Massa; Evgeniy Sadovskiy
- Website: www.litesound.com

Litesound is a Belarusian pop rock band formed in 2005 by brothers Dmitry and Vladimir Karyakin. In 2010, they released their debut album Going to Hollywood. Two years later, in 2012, the band was chosen to represent Belarus in the Eurovision Song Contest, performing the song "We Are the Heroes". As of 2018, they released their second studio album Litesound.

== History ==
=== Early years and debut album ===
The band, originally formed as an acoustic duo, was formed in 2002 by brothers Dmitry and Vladimir Karyakin. In 2005, the band was changed into a quartet and became what is known as Litesound. The additions included bassist Mario Gulinsky and drummer Sergey Genko. In 2006, the band won the Maiori International Music Festival, held in Italy, during which they met Italian singer Jacopo Massa, who was also taking part in the competition. Massa and Litesound started collaborating, leading Massa to appear at several concerts as a guest. Eventually, this lead Massa in becoming an official member of the band. Russian guitarist Alex Kolchin and Belarusian drummer Ignat Yakovich also joined the band, while Gulinsky and Genko left the group in 2006.

The band competed in the Eurofest 2006, in hope of representing Belarus in the Eurovision Song Contest, performing the song "My Faith", placing 6th. Litesound participated in the Eurofest 2008, performing the song "Do You Believe", in which they qualified to the final as 2nd, but eventually lost out to Ruslan Alekhno. They gave it another shot and returned to the Eurofest 2009, placing 3rd with the song "Carry On", featuring vocals by Dakota. In 2010, the band released the debut album Going to Hollywood, including the single "Solo Per Te".

=== Eurovision Song Contest 2012 ===
Starting from December 2011, Litesound, once again aimed to represent their country at Eurovision, by taking part in the Eurofest 2012. During the semi-final of the contest, Litesound performed the song "We Are the Heroes". After qualifying to the final, they decided not to change their entry. On 14 February 2012, Alyona Lanskaya was announced the winner of the Eurofest 2012, while Litesound came in 2nd place.

However, on 21 February 2012, the Belarusian president conducted an investigation about an alleged fraud in the televote, which turned out to be true. As a result of the investigation, All My Life by Alyona Lanskaya was disqualified. As a result, Litesound were then internally chosen to replace Alyona Lanskaya to represent Belarus in the Eurovision Song Contest 2012. Their entry "We Are the Heroes" was later re-recorded in a new version, produced by Dimitris Kontopoulos. The song ultimately failed to progress from the second semi-final into the final.

=== After Eurovision ===
In 2013, Alex Kolchin left the band. The new additions to the band were Artyom and Egor Doronkin, who are also brothers. Together they recorded the Christmas single "Shooting Star" accompanied with a music video. The Doronkin brothers left the band in 2015, while Andrey Ravovoy joined. Alex Kolchin returned to collaborate with Litesound on a cover of the Russian entry for Eurovision Song Contest 2015 "A Million Voices" by Polina Gagarina. On 16 April 2015, Litesound celebrated their 10th anniversary and released a new song for the occasion, "Give Me Your Hand".

In 2016, Litesound joined forces with Moldovan singer Katherine to enter the Eurovision Song Contest in Sweden, making this their 5th Eurovision attempt. After auditioning, they reached the semi-finals to represent Moldova with the song "Imagine". However, on 1 February it was announced that Katherine & Litesound withdrew their entry from the national selection for personal reasons.

Andrey Ravovoy left the band in 2016. After the departure of Ravovoy, the band released the single "Together (Young.Wild.Brave)". In 2017, they released "The Whole World", a song composed by international songwriters. Prior to the release of the song Evgeny Balchuys joined the band, becoming the new bassist. Andrey Ravovoy returned as the band's drummer in 2017. On 11 December 2017, Litesound released a teaser for their long-awaited second album, to be released in 2018, and the release of three new music videos. On 30 September 2018, Litesound released their long-awaited second album Litesound. In April 2019, Andrey Ravovoy and the band parted ways for a second time. On 25 June 2019, Litesound released the song "Champion", which was released as the official song to the European Games 2019 taking place in Minsk, Belarus. On 15 December 2019, they released their new single "Fight For The Dream", a song for the 2020 World Junior Ice Hockey Championships – Division I A held in Belarus.

=== 2020 and beyond ===
In 2020, the musicians criticised the policy of the Belarusian authorities regarding the COVID-19 pandemic. After that, the group was denied concerts on July 3 and participation in the Slavianski Bazaar. In July 2020, Litesound released a Belarusian-language version of "We Are the Heroes". The group spoke at a rally in support of Sviatlana Tsikhanouskaya.

On 13 October 2022, the Karyakin brothers and their parents were detained by the SOBR (special rapid response unit) soldiers in full gear. In March 2023, all four were sentenced to several years of restriction of freedom for participating in the 2020 protests.

== Band members ==
Current members

- Dmitry Karyakin – vocals, guitars, bass, keyboards, saxophone (2005–present)
- Vladimir Karyakin – vocals, guitars, keyboards (2005–present)
- Evgeny Balchuys – backing vocals, bass (2017–present)
- Max Bobko – drums (2019–present)

Past members

- Mario Gulinsky – bass guitar (2005–2006)
- Sergey Ginko – drums (2005–2006)
- Jacopo Massa – vocals, guitars (2006–2015)
- Evgeniy Sadovskiy – keyboards (2009–2012)
- Ignat Yakovich – drums (2012)
- Alex Kolchin – guitars (2012–2013)
- Artyom Doronkin – guitars (2013–2015)
- Egor Doronkin – drums (2013–2015)
- Andrey Ravovoy – drums (2015–2016, 2017–2019)

== Discography ==
=== Studio albums ===
- 2010: Going to Hollywood
- 2018: Litesound

=== Collaborative albums ===
- 2015: Songs (with Valeriy Golovko)
- 2019: The Star (with Valeriy Golovko)

=== Singles ===
- 2006: "My Faith"
- 2008: "Do You Believe"
- 2009: "Carry On" (Feat. Dakota)
- 2010: "Solo Per Te"
- 2011: "See You In Vegas"
- 2012: "We Are the Heroes"
- 2012: "Finally"
- 2013: "Shooting Star"
- 2014: "Brothers"
- 2015: "UFO"
- 2015: "I Wish You Were Near Me"
- 2015: "Give Me Your Hand"
- 2016: "Imagine" (Feat. Katherine)
- 2016: "Раздеть тебя" ("Razdet tebya")
- 2016: "Together (Young.Wild.Brave)"
- 2017: "Качели" ("Kacheli")
- 2017: "The Whole World"
- 2018: "Don't Worry About Me"
- 2019: "На клеточном уровне" ("Na kletochnom urovne")
- 2019: "Polina" (with Valeriy Golovko)
- 2019: "Ненормальный" ("Nenormal'nyy")
- 2019: "Champion"
- 2019: "Our Life" (with Valeriy Golovko)
- 2019: "Arcade Games"
- 2019: "Fight For The Dream"
- 2020: "Моя вселенная" ("Moya vselennaya")
- 2020: "Мы героі" ("My geroi")
- 2020: "Беларускаму люду" ("Bielaruskamu liudu")
- 2021: "Бесконечно" ("Beskonechno")
- 2021: "Fire"

=== Music videos ===
- 2010: "Solo Per Te"
- 2011: "See You In Vegas"
- 2012: "We Are the Heroes"
- 2012: "Finally"
- 2013: "Shooting Star"
- 2014: "Brothers"
- 2015: "UFO"
- 2015: "I Wish You Were Near Me"
- 2016: "Раздеть тебя" (Razdet tebya)
- 2016: "Together (Young.Wild.Brave)"
- 2018: "Don't Worry About Me"
- 2019: "Ненормальный" (Nenormal'nyy)
- 2019: "Champion"

=== Covers ===
- 2015: "Boogie Woogie Bugle Boy" (Feat. Andy Ray) (The Andrews Sisters Cover)
- 2015: "A Million Voices" (Feat. Alex Kolchin) (Polina Gagarina Cover)
- 2017: "There's Nothing Holdin' Me Back" (Shawn Mendes Cover)
- 2018: "Iris" (Goo Goo Dolls Cover)

Awards and achievements
| Preceded by Anastasia Vinnikova with "I Love Belarus" | Belarus in the Eurovision Song Contest; 2012 | Succeeded by Alyona Lanskaya with "Solayoh" |
