= Koldun (album) =

Колдун

Studio album by Dmitry Koldun
- Released: 3 September 2009 (Russia)
- Recorded: 2007 – 2008 (Lunev album); 2008 – 2009 (Lizard album) (Moscow)
- Genre: Pop rock, rock
- Length: 49:37
- Label: Lizard; Soyuz (Union) (Russia); West Records (Belarus)
- Producer: Dmitry Koldun

Singles from Колдун
- 1. "Настройся на Меня" Released: 18 July 2009

Koldun (Russian: Колдун) is the debut album from Belarusian singer Dmitry Koldun. Due to the change in producer and label, the album has been postponed many times and the name has changed from Ангел Под Дождем (English: Angel in the Rain) as it was Koldun's previous producer, Lunev, who named the album. Koldun released the album under his own label Lizard Studios 3 September 2009. On 21 August 2009 Koldun signed a deal with Russian leading media company Soyuz (Union) to produce and sell the album.

== 2008: Angel in the Rain ==
In an interview in August 2008 Koldun finally told the public the name of his previously untitled album. In the interview Koldun mentions that he wrote many songs for the album but perhaps only two will be featured.

On a Russian music news site, a representative correspondent from InterMedia (Russia) has stated that Koldun has worked on writing his own songs (music and lyrics) and is expected to produce about 20 songs in a more rock style to his current pop rock-themed music. The correspondent also stated that it is currently unknown what will happen to these new songs but are likely to remain just as a recording (in Moscow).

Koldun has shown great interest in releasing music in the UK and the US.

The album (under producer Lunev) was planned to feature both English and Russian songs with the possibility of having 12 tracks in total.

=== Production problems ===
The album was slated first to be released on 11 June 2008 (Koldun's birthday) but some minor production problems caused the release to be postponed to autumn 2008. However, in 2008 Koldun stopped working with Lunev due to conflicting opinions. Lunev did not want Koldun's own songs being featured on the debut album. Since the dispute Koldun is now his own producer and the album release was pushed to February/March 2009. Koldun has said (translated from Russian) "I was deciding for a long time what to do, but at the end of all I saw this is not going to work out and I decided to be my own producer. To be alone and be able to do with my music what I want."

After more than two years since Koldun was first made popular in Eurovision he announced on his official website that a ceremony will be held on 3 September to celebrate the release of his debut album. News later came of the title of the album Koldun a change to its previous title.

== Track listing ==
Track	Title	Length
1	Ангел Мечты/Angel Mechti; Angel Of Death	4:18
2	Плохая новость/Plohaya Novosti; Bad News	3:35
3	Не рай/Ne Rai; It isn't Paradise	3:23
4	Все что ты хочешь/Vse Chto Ti Hochesh; Everything That You Wish	4:03
5	Поезд на юг/Poezd na yug Train to the South	4:06
6	Reality Of Dreams (ft. Dmitry Chetvergov)	3:22
7	I Surrender	3:52
8	Don't Fade Away	3:48
9	Звезда/Zvezda (ft. Dmitry Chetvergov); The Star	3:43
10	Somebody's Loving You	4:28
11	Дай мне силу/Dai Mne Silu (2009 version); Give The Power to Me	3:23
Bonus tracks
12	Настройся на Меня (Dance Version); Tune in to Me	3:23
13	Я люблю тебя/Ya Lyublyu Tebya (Dance Version); I Love You	3:34

== See also ==
- Dmitry Koldun
- Dmitry Koldun discography
- Lizard
