= Work Your Magic =

2007 single by Dmitry Koldun

Single by Dmitry Koldun

from the album Koldun
- Released: 2007
- Recorded: 2007
- Genre: Pop rock
- Length: 3:08
- Composers: Philipp Kirkorov; Dimitris Kontopoulos
- Lyricist: Karen Kavaleryan

Dmitry Koldun singles chronology
"Work Your Magic" (2007)	"Ya Dlya Tebya" (2007)

Eurovision Song Contest 2007 entry
- Country: Belarus
- Artist: Dmitry Koldun
- Language: English
- Composers: Philipp Kirkorov; Dimitris Kontopoulos
- Lyricist: Karen Kavaleryan

Finals performance
- Semi-final result: 4th
- Semi-final points: 176
- Final result: 6th
- Final points: 145

Entry chronology
- ◄ "Mum" (2006)
- "Hasta La Vista" (2008) ►

"Work Your Magic" is a single released by Dmitry Koldun, which ranked 6th in the Eurovision Song Contest 2007 in Helsinki, representing Belarus. The title is a pun on the artist's surname, since koldun (колдун) in Russian means "magician" or "sorcerer".

The song is an up-tempo number, with Koldun describing the power that his lover has over him, likening it to "magic". He tells her that, as a result of her power, she can "keep [his] heart forever bound". He also promises "you'll get the best of what I've got".

"Work Your Magic" featured on Koldun's 2009 self-titled debut album as a new, longer version of "Dai Mne Silu" (Russian: Дай мне силу, lit. 'Give me the power'). The album was released shortly before the Eurovision Song Contest 2007, and features nine versions of the popular song "Work Your Magic". The CD comes with a DVD which has the official music video for "Work Your Magic" and "Dai Mne Silu". The set also includes a small biography for Koldun and producer Philip Kirkorov, the lyrics of "Work Your Magic" and some promotional photos. The CD/DVD set was originally sold in stores in Eastern Europe (being popular in Russia, Belarus and Greece), then sets were given away for free as a promotion – they were later given away for free with other items such as a Koldun T-shirt, cap and chocolate at the Eurovision Song Contest.

The song "Work Your Magic" proved popular in some Western European countries such as Ireland and Spain, although both countries awarded Belarus no points in the contest final. Three Western countries to give Belarus any points was Portugal (1 point), Malta (10 points) and Iceland (4 points).

== Music video and promotion ==
Koldun made his promotional music video for the song in Saint Petersburg. As both the artist's name and song may suggest, the video has a very strong "magical influence" as the video features magicians, witches, fire breathers, etc. The main plot appears to be a jealous queen's attempt to destroy a young woman whom Koldun may be singing about. The young woman is teleported through the fire into a grand castle-like setting as magical acts and occurrences around her. She runs through halls and corridors attempting to escape though in the end she runs into the queen (who is much larger than her) and is obliterated as the queen raises her hand and laughs in triumph. Throughout the video there are clips of Koldun performing the song, accompanied by two guitarists and a drummer.

The video bears a close resemblance to the video for the song "Jaded" by Aerosmith, in which many elements and characters, including the young female central to the story, are quite similar.

== Eurovision Song Contest ==
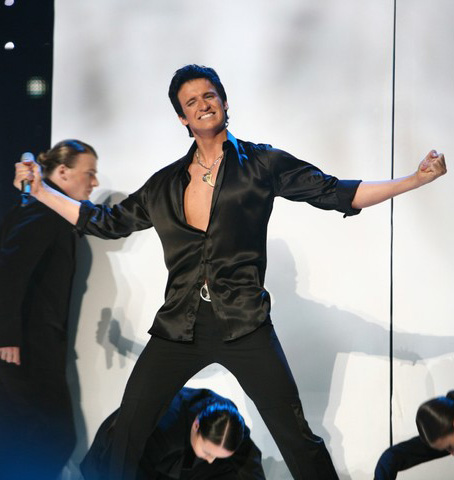
Koldun performing at the Eurovision Song Contest.

The performance in Helsinki featured two backing dancers climbing on moveable walls. BBC commentary focused on Koldun's perceived similarities to Princess Diana.

Prior to the contest Koldun led the biggest European tour ever made by any Eurovision participant appearing (and performing) all over Europe – Russia in the far east and Ireland, far west.

As Belarus had not finished in the top 10 in the Eurovision Song Contest 2006, the song had to compete in the semi-final. Here, it was performed fourth, following Cyprus' Evridiki with "Comme ci, comme ça" and preceding Iceland's Eiríkur Hauksson with "Valentine Lost". The song received 176 points in the semi-final, placing fourth in a field of 28 and qualifying Belarus for the final.

In the final, the song was performed third, following Spain's D'NASH with "I Love You Mi Vida" and preceding Ireland's Dervish with "They Can't Stop the Spring". At the close of voting, it had received 145 points, placing sixth in a field of 24.

It was noted on various Eurovision fan forums that the main string loop of the song was available commercially as "cinematic 11 orchestra 2" in the Cinematic volume of the Orchestral Series of Sony Sound Series libraries, although this apparently did not constitute a breach of Eurovision rules.

== Track listing ==
1. "Work Your Magic" – 3:06
2. "Dai Mne Silu" – 3:06
3. "Work Your Magic" (Deep Zone Project Remix) – 4:35
4. "Work Your Magic" (Deep Zone Project short dance remix) – 2:38
5. "Work Your Magic" (Zoloto remix) – 4:00
6. "Dai Mne Silu" (Deep Zone Project remix) – 4:35
7. "Dai Mne Silu" (Deep Zone Project short dance remix) – 2:38
8. "Dai Mne Silu" (Zoloto remix) – 4:00
9. "Work Your Magic" (Karaoke version) – 3:06

=== DVD ===
The Koldun Slideshow is a series of professional photographs displayed in a slide show form with "Work Your Magic" as a backing track. The video also shows Philip Kirkorov and the Eurovision logo (the Eurovision heart) with the Belarusian flag in its centre. The second disc included with "Work Your Magic" is a video DVD with the following three files:

1. "Work Your Magic" music video
2. "Dai Mne Silu" music video
3. Koldun Slide Show

== Credits and personnel ==
=== CD ===
Mastering:

- Rembo, "Grimm Brothers" Studio

Remixes:

- Dian Savov (DJ Dian), Rosen Stoev, Lyubomir Savov – Deep Zone Project
- Vladimir Adarichev, Andrei Pokutni

Credits:

- Produced & arranged by DTC
- Guitars – Kodakis Spyros
- Backing vocals – Halkiti Victoria & Psihramis Apostolos
- Sound recording and Mix – Binis Aris
- Studio – Vox Recording Studio, Athens Greece 2007

=== DVD ===
Photography:

- George Kalfamanolis (Greece)

Creative:

- Yana Rudkovskaya, Philip Kirkorov (Russia)

Design:

- Stepan Hajyan (Armenia)

== Cover versions ==
There is a Russian version of the song titled "Dai Mne Silu" as well as several remixes (e.g. Zoloto, Deep Zone Project and a Russian/English lyric mix). The song was released in Russia and Belarus several weeks after "Work Your Magic" and though it was successful it failed to achieve the popularity or rating of "Work Your Magic".

== Charts ==
=== Weekly charts ===
Chart (2007)	Peak position
CIS Airplay (TopHit)	2
Sweden (Sverigetopplistan)	34

=== Year-end charts ===
Chart (2007)	Position
CIS (Tophit)	23
