= Dmitry Koldun =

Belarusian singer (born 1985)

Dmitry Koldun Дзмітры Калдун
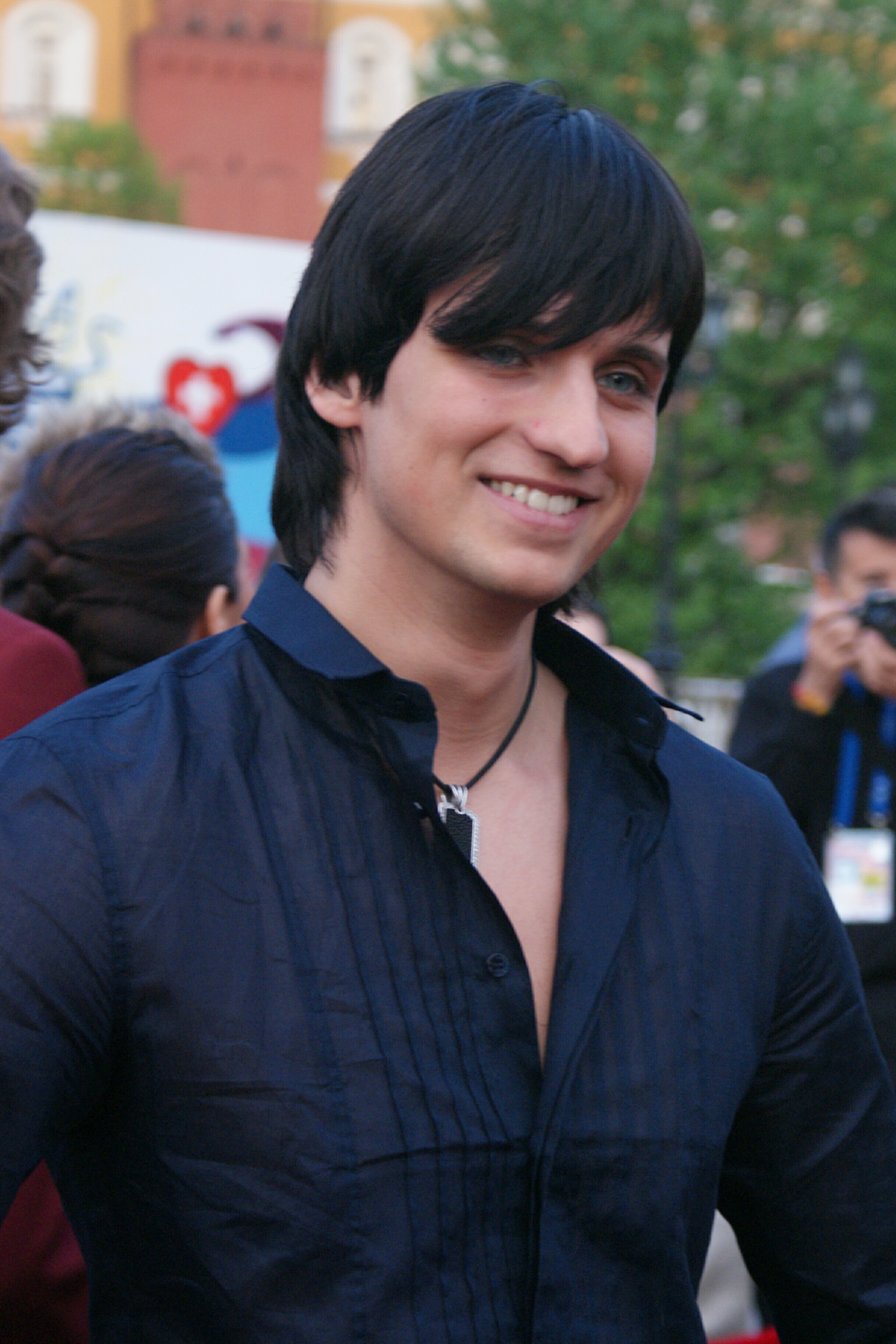
- Koldun in 2009

Background information
- Also known as: Dima Koldun
- Born: 11 June 1985 (age 41)
- Origin: Minsk, Belarusian SSR, Soviet Union
- Genres: Pop, Pop rock, synthpop
- Occupation: Singer
- Years active: 2004–present
- Label: Lizard

Dmitry Aleksandrovich Koldun (Belarusian: Дзмітры Аляксандравіч Калдун, Dzmitry Kaldun; Russian: Дмитрий Александрович Колдун; born 11 June 1985) is a Belarusian pop singer.

Koldun rose to fame through his participation in several Russian television talent shows. In 2006, he won the sixth season of Fabrika Zvyozd. He acquired further fame when he represented Belarus in the Eurovision Song Contest 2007 with "Work Your Magic". Koldun finished sixth overall, which remains the country's most successful result to date.

He starred as Joaquín in the rock opera "Звезда и Смерть Хоакина Мурьеты" (The Star and the Death of Joaquín Murety) staged at the Lenkom Theatre.

After Fabrika Zvyozd and Eurovision, Koldun has enjoyed long-term commercial success in his native Belarus and Russia. In total, Koldun has released five studio albums and one extended play.

== Early life ==
Koldun was born in Minsk, Belarusian SSR, USSR. He has one older brother, Georgy. His parents divorced when he was a child, and he decided to stay with his mother, while his brother went to live with their father. He later said that he found the divorce to be traumatic for him and that it was not something he wanted to repeat for himself.

== Career ==
=== 2004-2006: Narodnyi Artist-2 and Fabrika Zvyozd ===
In 2004, he tried out in the RTR show Narodnyi Artist-2, but did not qualify to the main stage. This did not deter him from his musical interest and in 2004 and 2005 he worked in the State Concert Orchestra of the Republic of Belarus headed by Mikhail Finberg and in the Grand-Prix studio headed by the composer Oleg Eliseenkov. In July 2005, Koldun took part Slavianski Bazaar in Vitebsk.

In 2006, Koldun won the sixth season of the Russian television show Fabrika Zvyozd on Channel One. Throughout the show, Koldun proved to be a very popular candidate, mainly for his quirky and carefree behaviour in the shared living space of the contestants. In 2020, Koldun said that it was not necessarily singing that was important in Fabrika Zvyozd, but the way you behave on camera and that he understood that from the start.

During Fabrika Zvyozd, Koldun performed with several artists including the renowned Scorpions performing "Still Loving You" after which he was invited by the soloist Klaus Meine to perform this song on a joint tour. Due to his successes Koldun became popular in Russia and other past Soviet states. Koldun signed a contract with the National Music Corporation and became the soloist of the reformed group K.G.B. (Koldun, Gurkov, Barsukov).

=== 2007: Eurovision Song Contest ===
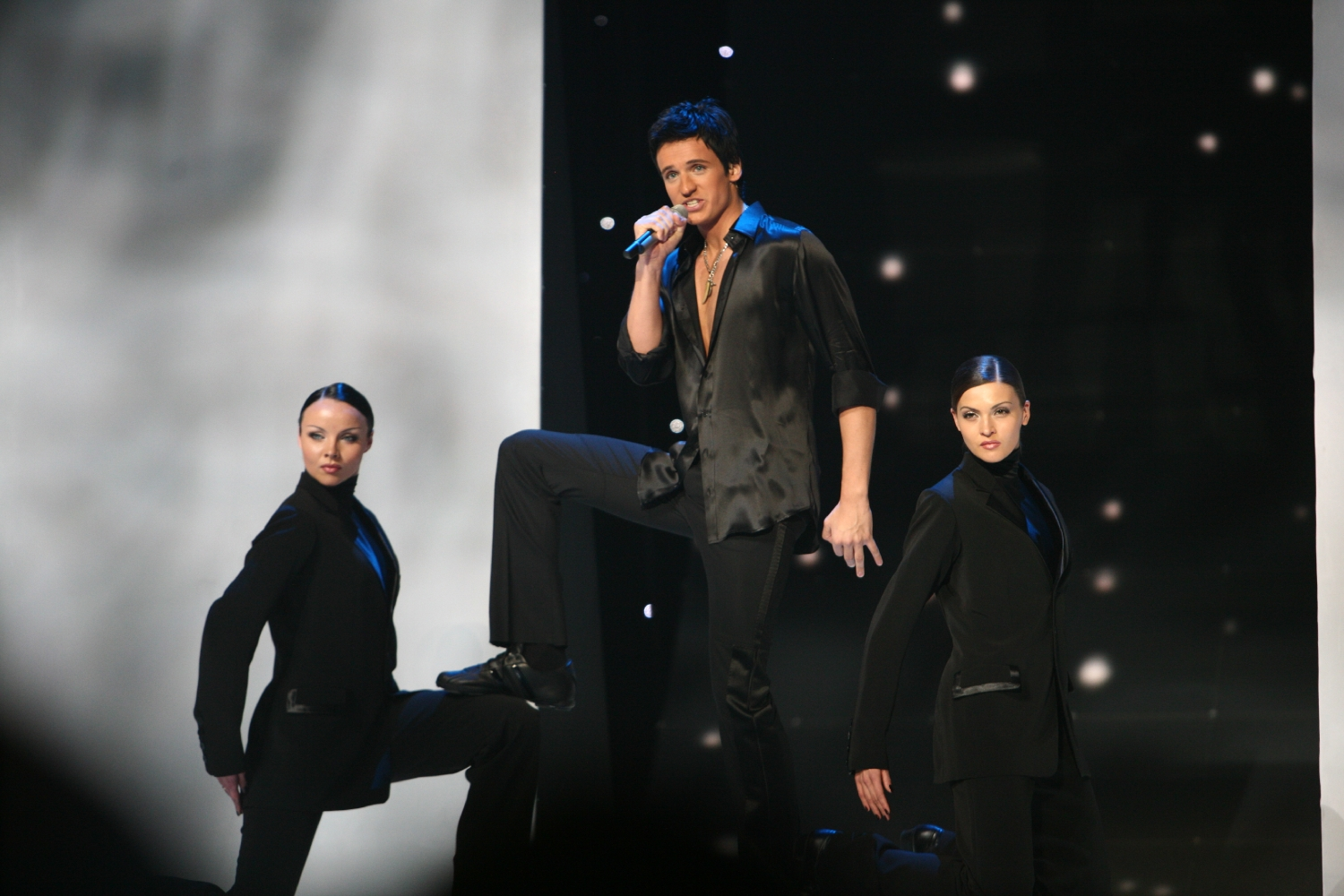
Koldun at Eurovision 2007

==== Before Eurovision ====
After leaving the group Koldun returned to Belarus to take part in Eurofest. In the preliminary stage, Koldun performed "Angel Mechty" receiving 4412 votes, 32% of the public vote. Initially, Koldun was scheduled to perform with a song called "Get Up", produced by Viktor Drobysh. However, Eurovision web site ESCKAZ discovered that the song had already been released commercially by Finnish band The Ratzz. The song, called "Aave" in Finnish, written by Jörgen Elofsson, Maki Kolehmainen and Tracy Lipp was included into the debut album of the band Hard Ratzz Hallelujah. As ESCKaz was told by a representative of the label Helsinki Music Centre: "We were not aware that Dmitry Koldun had been performing the song. The rights for both "Aave" and "Get Up, Get Down, Get Crazy" are possessed by HMC & BMG Music Publishing Scandinavia, song was already published by us on The Ratzz album". ESCKaz also learned that Koldun was regularly performing the song "Get Up" on a Star Factory 6 tour including the series of commercial concerts in Belarus at the beginning of September. The song was also available since mid-September on the internet. Both are prohibited by "Eurovision Song Contest 2007" regulations that do not allow competing songs to be publicly performed before 1 October 2006. This same rule is repeated in the "Eurofest" rules in following variant, paragraph 2.1: "The songs for contest ("entries") (lyrics and music) must not have been commercially released and/or publicly performed before 1 October 2006. The entry as a copyright object must not have been released through the Internet or any other media".

However, towards the national final, Russian producer and singer Philipp Kirkorov offered Koldun a new song, called "Work Your Magic" with lyrics written by Karen Kavaleryan. Koldun accepted the offer and performed "Work Your Magic" at the second stage of the Belarusian selection. Koldun eventually won the selection after a jury chaired by Alexander Tikhanovich appointed him as the winner.

==== At Eurovision ====
As Belarus had not finished the 2006 Contest in the top 10, the song was performed in the semi-final. Here, it was performed fourth (following Cyprus' Evridiki with "Comme Ci, Comme Ça" and preceding Iceland's Eiríkur Hauksson with Valentine Lost). The song received 176 points in the semi-final on 10 May, placing 4th in a field of 28 and qualifying Belarus for the final.

In the final on 12 May, the song was performed third (following Spain's D'NASH with "I Love You Mi Vida" and preceding Ireland's Dervish with "They Can't Stop The Spring"). Koldun received the maximum 12 points from Israel, Russia and Ukraine and in total receiving 145 points earning 6th place in a field of 24, the highest position ever achieved by Belarus.

=== 2008-2012: Producers dispute, first albums ===
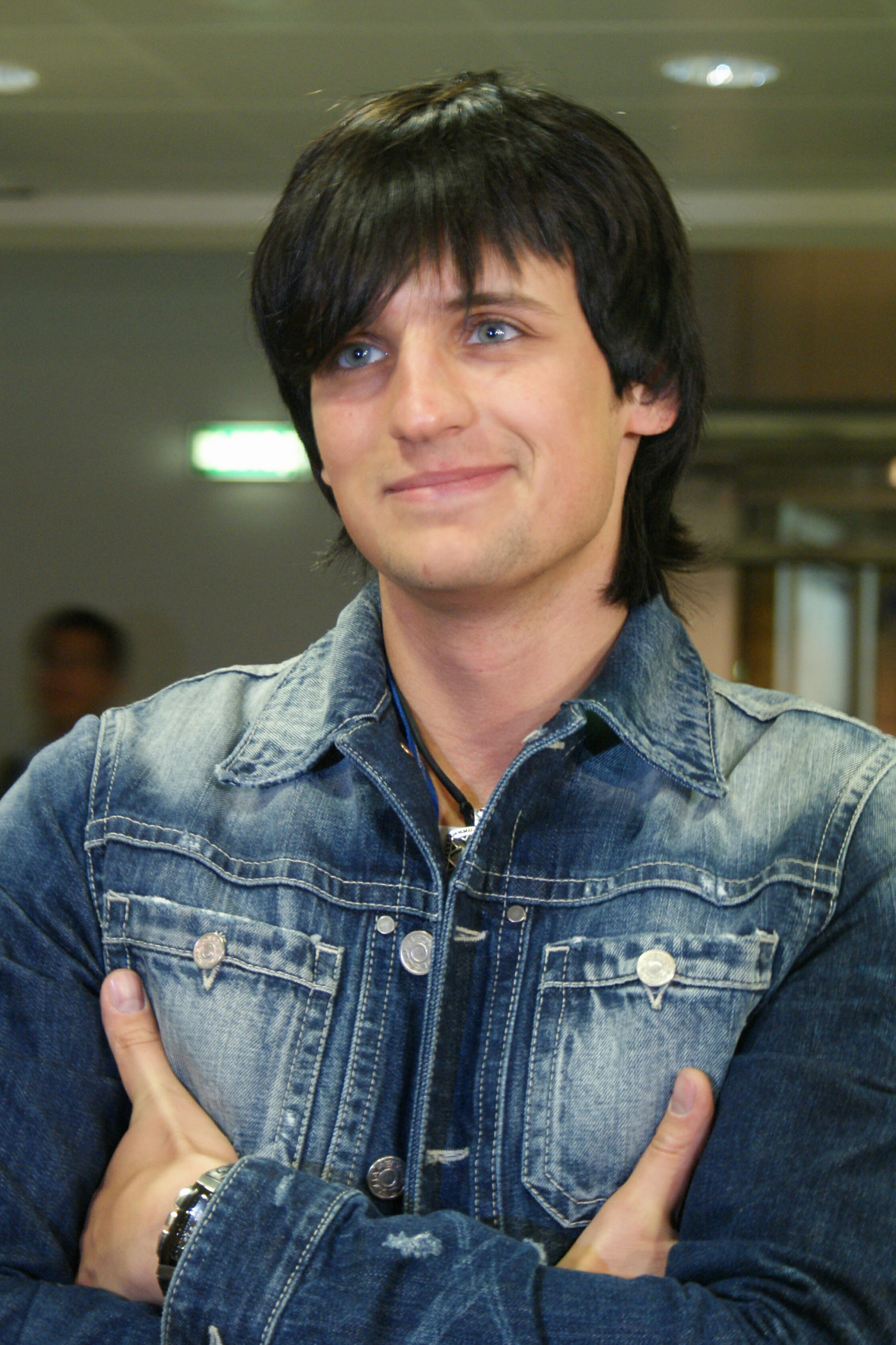
Dmitry Koldun in Moscow in 2009.

After Koldun's successful performance in Eurovision and after "Work Your Magic" became a big hit, there were arguments over who would become Koldun's producer. The two out-spoken producers who wanted to work with Koldun were Philipp Kirkorov (producer of "Work Your Magic") and Victor Drobysh (producer of controversial "Get Up") who both spoke out against each other in the media. However it was Alexander Lunyov, famous for the song "Never Let You Go" by Dima Bilan, who became Koldun's producer. Lunev would then go on to produce Koldun's debut album.

In 2008, Koldun stopped working with Lunev due to conflicting opinions. Lunev did not want songs written by Koldun on the debut album. Since the dispute Koldun is now his own producer and the album release has been postponed again. In 2009 Koldun founded his own label with Alexander Astashenok (a Russian musician, member of Russian band Корни (Roots)) named Lizard (Ящерица or Yasheritsa in Russian).

In 2008, Koldun revealed he would star in "Russia's very first rock opera". Koldun was originally asked just to perform the songs but popular Russian composer Alexey Rybnikov insisted Koldun to play the star of the opera named "Звезда и Смерть Хоакина Мурьеты" (The Star and the Death of Joaquín Murety) alongside Svetlana Svetikova and Igor Sandler also, to which Koldun agreed. The opera received support from Dmitry Chetvergova's rock band as well as financial support from the government of Moscow.

The opera is based on the life of Joaquin Murrieta, a semi-legendary figure in California during the California Gold Rush of the 1850s. Murrietta was partly the inspiration for the fictional character of Zorro, Zorro themes are used in the opera. Svetikova played Murrieta's love interest in the opera. The opera follows one famous story of Murrieta as several exist some describing Murrieta a hero, others a villain. The Russian opera depicts Murrieta as a hero who has to prove his innocence despite his "Wanted" status.

=== 2013-present: Gorod bol'shikh ogney, chart success and Maneken ===
Between 2013 and 2017, Koldun had a long string of radio hits in Russia. With the single "Gorod bol'shikh ogney" ("The city of large fires"), Koldun peaked at #6 of Russia's TopHit radio charts. The song stayed in the top 100 for over fourteen months. In 2014, the song became the 12th most played song on Russian radio and the sixth most played song in Russian. In 2014, Koldun worked on the music video for his single "Pochemu", for which he died his hair back blonde.

To celebrate the birth of his second child, a daughter, in 2016, Koldun released the single "Potseluy menya". The lyrics of the song were penned by himself. The single received chart success in Russia, peaking at #17.

== Personal life ==
Many people have compared Koldun's appearance to that of Diana.

Koldun revealed that he has suffered from hair discolouring. "Every year my hair colour changes...in my school years I had thick hair. But not now. I believe that that is the fault of the Chernobyl disaster." Koldun states his hair colour has changed from blonde, at an early age in school, gradually (sometimes overnight) becoming shades darker to the 'burning' brunette he is today (naturally).

In 2012, he married his childhood sweetheart Viktoria. He has two children, a son (born 2012) and a daughter (born 2016). Koldun divides his time between his house in Minsk and his apartment in Moscow.

In July 2020, the singer fell ill with symptoms from COVID-19 and was admitted to a hospital in Minsk. Koldun's hospitalisation attracted large media attention in both Belarus and Russia. A few days prior to his hospitalisation, he had performed an opening of a water fountain that was also attended by the president, who was under criticism over his handling of the COVID-19 pandemic. The Belarusian Ministry of Health announced via a statement that Koldun did not have the virus, while Koldun later said in the media that he had tested positive.

In 2022, Koldun revealed that he suffers from a severe form of tinnitus and that he has been deaf in one ear for over a decade following an on-site accident during a television programme involving a tank shooting.

== Discography ==
=== Albums ===
- 2009 – Колдун
- 2012 – Nochnoy Pilot (Ночной Пилот, Night Pilot)
- 2013 – Город больших огней
- 2014 – Maneken

=== Singles ===
Year	Single	Album	Chart position			
Year	Single	Album	RUS	LAT	SPN	SWE
2007	"Work Your Magic"	Я Не Волшебник	2	3	34	47
2007	"Я Для Тебя" (Ya Dlya Tyebya)	Я Не Волшебник	5	23	—	—
2008	"Царевна" (Tsarevna)	Я Не Волшебник	13	—	—	—
2008	"Настройся на Меня" (Nastroysya na Menya)	Колдун	28	—	—	—
2010	"В комнате пустой" (V Komnate Pustoy)	Колдун	—	—	—	—
2011	"Nochnoy pilot" (Nochnoy Pilot)	Ночной пилот	—	—	—	—
2011	"Corabli" (Corabli)	Ночной пилот	10	—	—	—
2012	"Nichego" (Ничего)	Ночной пилот	—	—	—	—
Number-one hits			—	—	—	—
Top ten hits			2	1	—	—

Awards and achievements
Preceded by Victoria Dayneko	Star Factory (Russia) winner 2006	Succeeded by Anastasia Prikhodko
Preceded by Polina Smolova with "Mum"	Belarus in the Eurovision Song Contest; 2007	Succeeded by Ruslan Alekhno with "Hasta la Vista"
