= Ilija Krpić =

Early 20th century Serbian archpriest

- Born: 8 August 1887; Popovac (Čelinac), Austro-Hungarian Empire
- Died: 16 August 1932 (aged 45); Mrkonjić Grad, Kingdom of Yugoslavia
- Known for: one of the founders of the Serbian Cultural-Educational Society “Prosvjeta”

Ilija Krpić (August 8, 1887 – August 16, 1932) was a Serbian archpriest who worked on the promotion of Serb national interests in Medna. He is one of the founders of the Serbian Cultural-Educational Society “Prosvjeta”. Due to his resistance against the policies of the Austro-Hungarian Empire, he was persecuted by the Austro-Hungarian authorities. Krpić founded the Agricultural cooperative and spread cooperative awareness among the peasants, earning him a great reputation among them. Due to his growing popularity, Krpić became a threat to his political opponents. This led to his assassination in Mrkonjić Grad on August 16, 1932.

== Life and work ==
Ilija Krpić was born on August 8, 1887, in Popovac near Čelinac. He graduated from high school and seminary in Reljevo. He was engaged in national work very early. He participated in all student organizations that were opposed to Austria-Hungary, so he was persecuted by the Austro- Hungarian authorities. He is one of the 29 founders of the Serbian educational and cultural society "Prosvjeta". The application for the establishment of Prosvjeta was submitted in 1901, and the authorities, after much suspicion and hesitation, approved the establishment of Prosvjeta in 1902.

After finishing the seminary, he was ordained a deacon on July 31 and a priest on August 1, 1911. He was appointed parish priest in Medna near Mrkonjić Grad. When the World War I broke out, the Austro-Hungarian authorities began huge reprisals against the Serbian population in Bosnia and Herzegovina. Ilija Krpić was first taken as a hostage to the Bočac camp. Later he was imprisoned in Bosanski Brod, and at the end interned in Arad, where his health deteriorated. By 1917, he returned to Medna.

After the liberation and the establishment of the Kingdom of SHS, he became involved in politics. He was an active member and one of the founders of the Agrarian Party. He became a member of the Regional Assembly in Travnik. He founded the agricultural cooperative in Medna, Through his efforts, he managed to develop a strong cooperative consciousness among the population, particularly among the peasants. This led to him gaining a great reputation among the peasants, which made his political opponents consider him a big threat to their interests. Unfortunately, he was killed on August 16, 1932, in Mrkonjić Grad by his political opponent, the state's forest officer Nikola Čulić.

== Legacy ==
Ilija Krpić left behind his wife Stana and four children: Mica, Milorad, Smilja, and Leposava. Milorad and Mica joined the ranks of the Yugoslav Partisans. Milorad unfortunately died fighting in the partisans, while Mica became a prominent fighter. In honor of her contributions, the school in her birthplace Medna was named after Mica Krpić. Ilija's eldest daughter Leposava was a school director in Belgrade, while her daughter Branislava Bošković was a professor of French language, married the Yugoslav diplomat and ambassador Petar Bošković .
