= Serbs of Bosnia and Herzegovina =

Ethnic group

Срби Босне и Херцеговине Srbi Bosne i Hercegovine
- Flag of Republika Srpska

Total population
- 1,086,733 (2013)

Regions with significant populations
- Republika Srpska

Languages
- Serbian

Religion
- Eastern Orthodoxy (Serbian Orthodox Church)

The Serbs of Bosnia and Herzegovina or Bosnian Serbs, (Note: The correct political term is Serbs of Bosnia and Herzegovina (Serbian: Срби у Босни и Херцеговини, romanized: Srbi u Bosni i Hercegovini). They are also often referred to as Bosnian Serbs (Serbian: Босански Срби, romanized: Bosanski Srbi) or Herzegovinian Serbs Serbian: Херцеговачки Срби, romanized: Hercegovački Srbi.) are one of the three constituent peoples of Bosnia and Herzegovina. According to data from the 2013 census, the population of ethnic Serbs in Bosnia and Herzegovina was 1,086,733, constituting 30.8% of the total population; they are the second-largest ethnic group in the country (after Bosniaks) and live predominantly in Republika Srpska.

Serbs have a long history of inhabiting the present-day territory of Bosnia and Herzegovina as well as statehood in the territory. Slavs settled the Balkans in the 6th century and the Serbs were one of the main tribes who settled the peninsula including parts of modern-day Bosnia and Herzegovina. Parts of Bosnia were ruled by the Serbian prince Časlav in the 10th century while the southeastern and eastern parts became integrated into the Serbian medieval state under the Nemanjić dynasty by the 13th-14th centuries. After the Ottoman conquest of Bosnia and Herzegovina, the majority of the Orthodox Christian population in the region retained their Serbian ethnic and religious identity under the restored Serbian Patriarchate of Peć, while many landowners converted to Islam. Throughout the period of Ottoman rule, the Serbs of Bosnia and Herzegovina, formed the core of several major uprisings against Ottoman rule. In 1878, following the Congress of Berlin, Austria-Hungary occupied Bosnia and Herzegovina, facing resistance from the Serb population, which increasingly aspired to unification with the Kingdom of Serbia, culminating in growing tensions that contributed to the assassination of Archduke Franz Ferdinand in Sarajevo, which led to the outbreak of World War I.

After the dissolution of Austria-Hungary in 1918, the Serb population of Bosnia and Herzegovina supported the creation of the Kingdom of Serbs, Croats, and Slovenes (later renamed Yugoslavia), seeing it as the realization of national unification with Serbia. During the World War II, Bosnia and Herzegovina became part of the Nazi-puppet state of Independent State of Croatia in which hundreds of thousands of Serbs were killed in a genocide carried out by the Ustaše regime, while the Partisan fought the Nazi occupiers and their collaborators. In socialist Yugoslavia, Serbs were recognized as one of the three constituent peoples of Bosnia and Herzegovina, holding significant political influence, while the republic experienced rapid industrialization and inter-ethnic peace until the late 1990s. The Bosnian War, triggered by the republic’s secession from Yugoslavia, saw the displacement of populations; the Dayton Agreement established Bosnia and Herzegovina as a consociational state of two entities, where Serbs today maintain strong political autonomy within the political-territorial entity of Republika Srpska, while continuing debates over centralization, secession threats, and NATO integration persist.

== History ==
=== Early Middle Ages ===
Slavic settlement in the Balkans began in the 6th century. The territory of present-day southwestern Serbia (Raška or "Rascia") and eastern Bosnia were the center of Serb settlement. Serb tribes and the groups of Slavs identifying with Serbs gradually expanded across Herzegovina and the Adriatic littoral.

Prince Vlastimir (r. 830–850) united the Serbian tribes in the vicinity, and after a victory over the advancing Bulgars, he went on to expand to the west, taking Bosnia and Zachlumia (Herzegovina). It is at about this point that Bosnia emerges in the sources as a distinct territorial entity, in De Administrando Imperio (ca. 960), a political and geographical document written by Eastern Roman Emperor Constantine VII. In a section dedicated to the territories of the Serbian Prince Časlav his lands were described as including "Bosona, Katera and Desnik", demonstrating Bosnia's dependency on Serbs, although the areas comprised were smaller than modern-day Bosnia. Following his death, much of Bosnia was subjected to Croatian rule, before the arrival of Samuel of Bulgaria who subjugated the territory but eventually found himself deposed by the Byzantine Empire.

=== High and late Middle Ages ===
Serbian polities (in green), the 11th century

Over the course of the 11th century, Bosnia shifted between partial Croatian and partial Serbian governance. To the south of Bosnia proper laid the territories of Duklja, which included Zeta and Zachlumia, who were consolidated into a Serbian Kingdom and ruled by local Serb princes. Under Constantin Bodin, Serbian territory expanded to take most of Bosnia but the Kingdom broke up following his death in 1101. For much of the 12th century Bosnia was in a tug of war between Hungary and the Byzantine empire; Hungary annexed it 1137 before losing it to the Byzantine empire in 1167, and retaking it in 1180. After 1180, Ban Kulin, ruler of Bosnia began to assert his independence and Hungarian control became nominal. For most of the early medieval period Herzegovina was, effectively, Serbian territory with Bosnia proper being tied politically and religiously more towards Croatia. However, neither neighbor had held the territory long enough to acquire their loyalty or to impose any serious claim to Bosnia.

The Kotromanić noble and later royal dynasty would rule Bosnia from the second half of the 13th century until Ottoman conquest in 1463. It began with Stephen II in 1322, who managed to expand the realm of the Bosnian state with the acquisition of territories that included Herzegovina, enabling the formation of a single Bosnia and Herzegovina political entity for the first time. The Kotromanić intermarried with several southeastern and central European royal houses which aided their dynastic development. Stephen II's nephew, Tvrtko I, a descendant of the Serbian Nemanjić dynasty, succeeded him and established the Kingdom of Bosnia in 1377, crowning himself as "The King of Serbs and Bosnia". The last sovereign, Stephen Tomašević, ruled briefly as Despot of Serbia in 1459 and as King of Bosnia between 1461 and 1463, before losing both countries and his life to the Ottomans.

By the Middle Ages, Eastern Orthodoxy had become entrenched in Herzegovina, and during the Nemanjić dynasty the Serbian Orthodox Church's influence grew in the region. However, Orthodoxy lacked consequential progression into Bosnia until the Ottoman conquest. According to some historians, there was a general awareness in medieval Bosnia, at least amongst the rulers, of belonging to a joint state with Serbia and the same group of people. That awareness diminished over time, due to differences in political and social development, although it was kept in Herzegovina and parts of Bosnia, which were a part of the Serbian state.

=== Ottoman rule ===
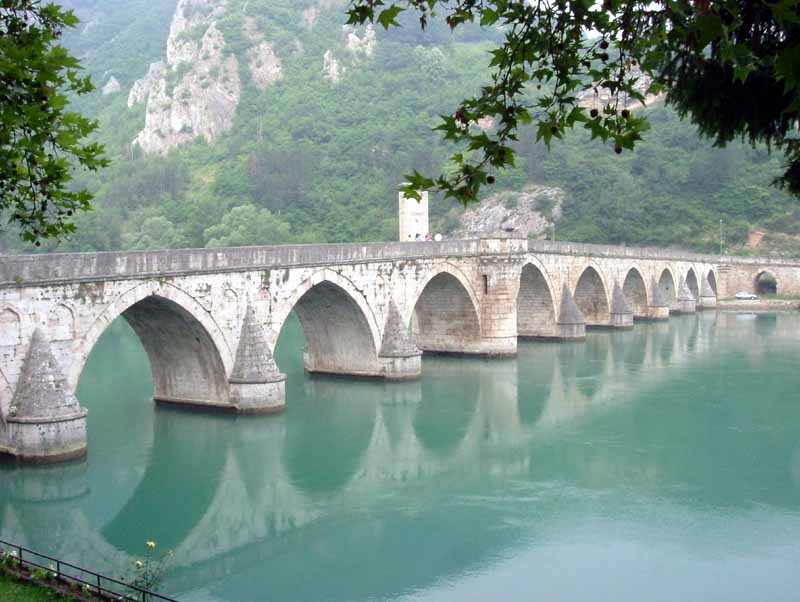
Mehmed Paša Sokolović Bridge (UNESCO World Heritage Site), 16th century

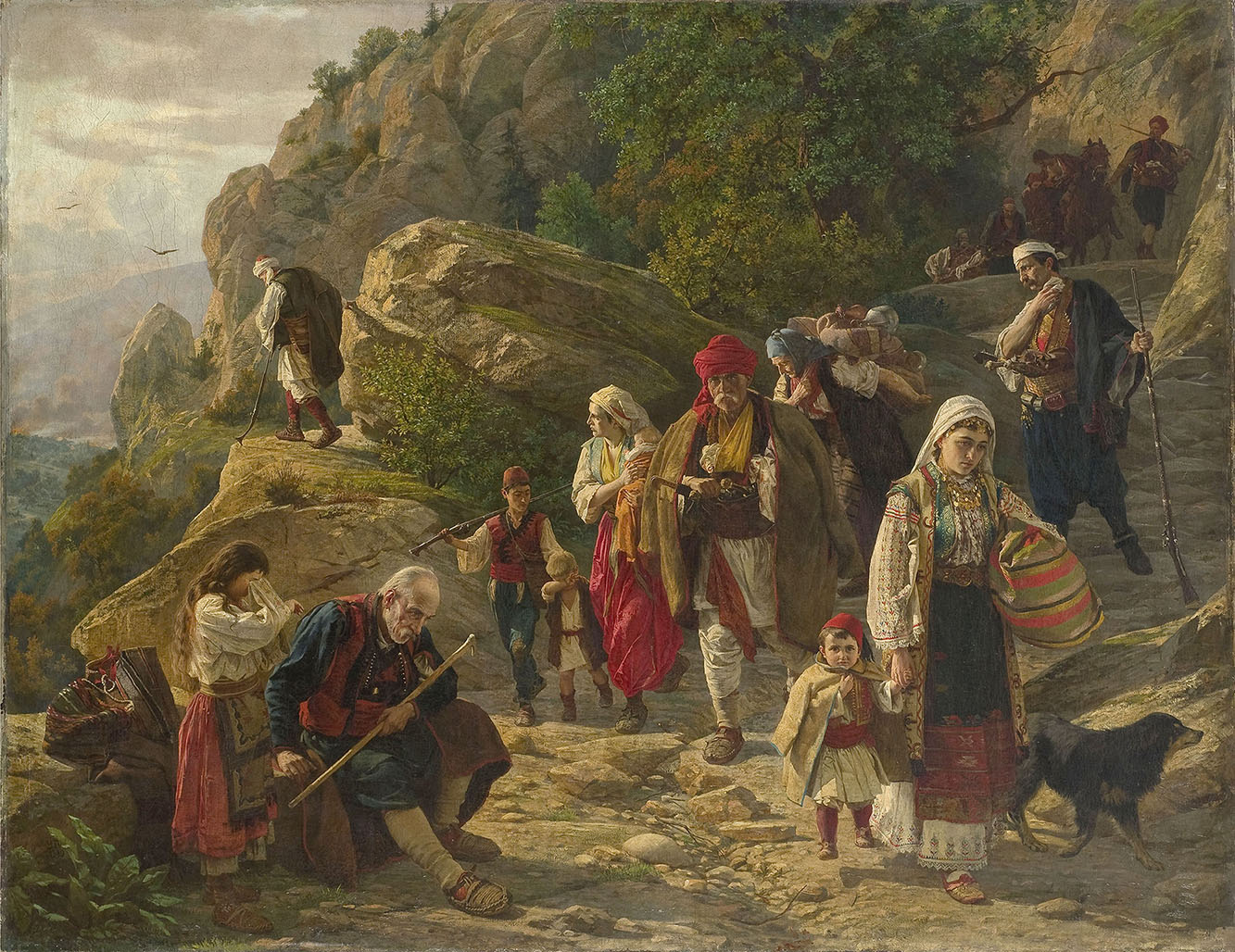
Refugees from Herzegovina, 1889 painting by Uroš Predić, depicting the Herzegovina uprising

The conquest of Bosnia by the Ottomans brought significant administrative, economic, social and cultural changes to the country. The Ottomans however, allowed for the preservation of Bosnian identity and territorial integrity by merely making Bosnia an integral province of its Empire. Under the millet system, Christians were granted a level of autonomy by the provision of local leaders who served the Ottoman state for religious, social, administrative, and legal purposes. The Ottomans allowed Christian communities to band together around these religious leaders and preserve their customs. Consequently, this system also made a clear distinction between Muslims and non-Muslims, paving the way for Islamic supremacy and discrimination towards Christians. For instance, non-Muslims had to pay additional taxes and could not own any land or property or hold positions in the Ottoman state apparatus. Thus, conversion to Islam was advantageous to Bosnians and the 15th and 16th centuries marked the beginning of the Islamization period. A major effect of this system was also the development of three distinct ethnic identities among the Bosnians during the 19th century. Given the threat of the Habsburg Empire to the Ottoman Empire, the Catholics of Bosnia faced strenuous religious oppression, although this same level of discrimination was also applied to the Orthodox population with the rise of an independent Serbian state in the 19th century. During the same period, Ottoman policies favored the settlement of a sizeable Orthodox Christian population into Bosnia proper, including some Vlachs from the central Balkans. The conversion of the adherents of the Bosnian Church also aided the spread of Eastern Orthodoxy. Later, some areas abandoned by Catholics during the Ottoman–Habsburg wars were settled with both Muslims and Orthodox Christians.

Construction of Orthodox monasteries and churches throughout Bosnia started in the northwest in 1515. An Orthodox priest was present in Sarajevo already in 1489, and the city's first Orthodox church was constructed between 1520 and 1539. The Serbian Patriarchate of Peć established a separate metropolitanate for Orthodox Christians in Bosnia, with metropolitan formally transferring his seat to Sarajevo in 1699. A turning point in relations between the Orthodox Church and the Ottomans occurred when Orthodox clergy renounced loyalty to the sultans and started encouraging and aiding peasant rebellions, and seeking Christian allies in neighboring lands, which in turn resulted in the persecution of their clergy. A major Serb uprising against Ottoman rule occurred during the Long Turkish War (1593–1606) when Serb clan chieftains in Herzegovina rose in rebellion actively supporting the Habsburg-led Holy League against the Ottomans and pursued the broader aim of restoring an independent Serbian state. The Herzegovina clan leaders coordinated with the Republic of Venice and with the Spanish viceroy of Naples, who provided promises of military and financial aid for the anti-Ottoman cause.

Around a quarter of rebel leaders (voivodes) of the Serbian Revolution were born in modern-day Bosnia and Herzegovina or had their roots in the region of Bosnia or Herzegovina. Mateja Nenadović met with local Serb leaders from Sarajevo in 1803 in order to negotiate their part in the rebellion, with the ultimate goal being that the two armies meet in Sarajevo.

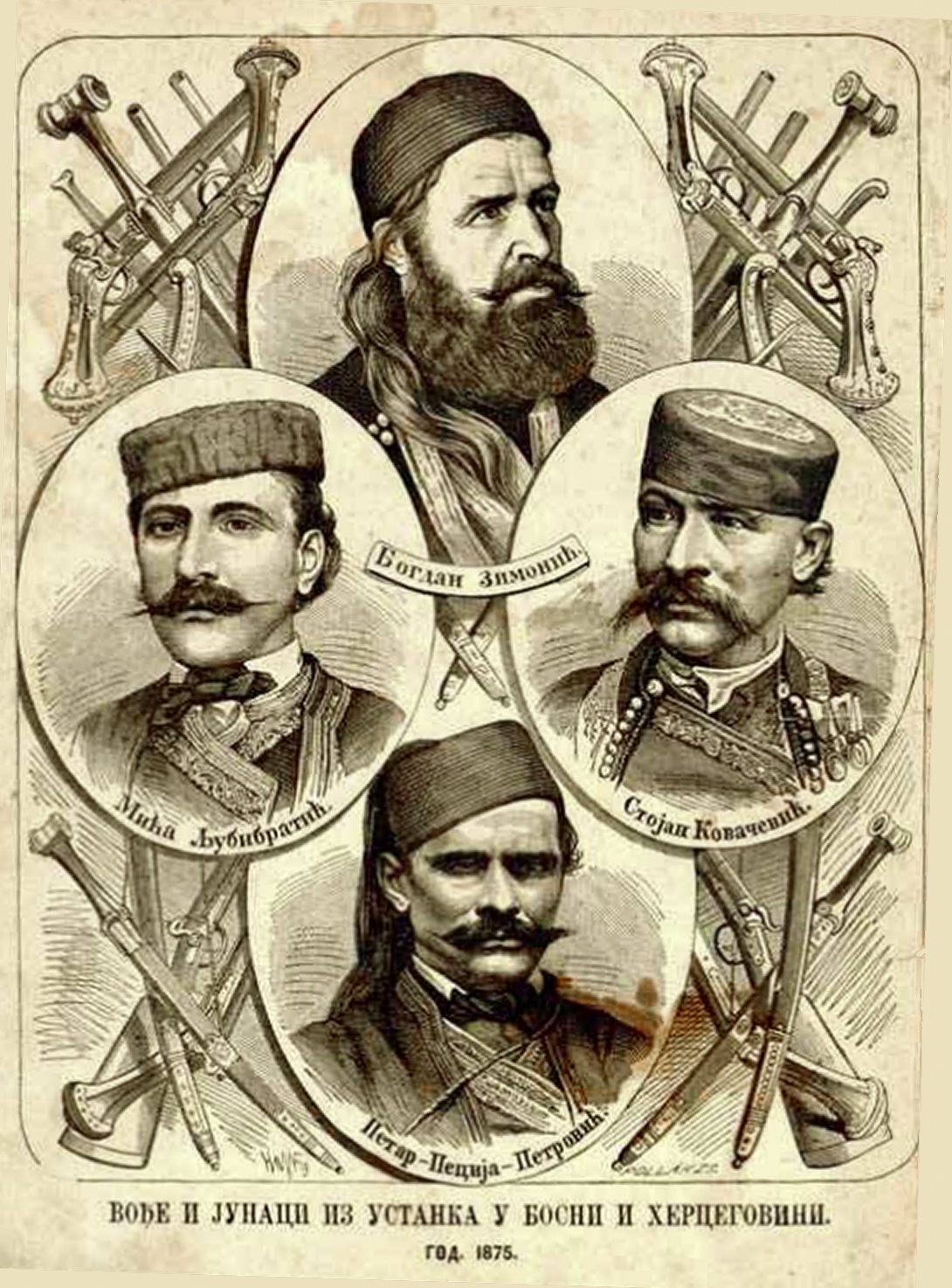
Illustrated depiction of leaders of the Serb uprisings and revolts in 1852, 1858, and 1875

As the rise of Western European development overshadowed the feudal Ottoman system, the empire began a sharp decline that was evident in the 19th century. Bosnia was at this point a regressive state with large landowners, poor peasantry, and a lack of industry and modern transport. A number of anti-Ottoman rebellions occurred, as the dissatisfaction of land-owning Bosnian Muslims aligned itself with nationalistic movements of the non-Muslim population. The various rebellions were largely directed at the Ottoman state and not a product of infighting between the various groups. The Serbs of Bosnia allied themselves with the cause of Serbian statehood; Muslim rebellions sought to stop administrative reforms and peasant rebellions were due to agrarian strife. After the reorganization of the Ottoman army and abolition of the Janissaries, Bosnian nobility revolted in 1831, led by Husein Gradaščević, who wanted to preserve existing privileges and stop any further social reforms. The pivotal rebellion began in 1875 with an uprising in Herzegovina on the part of the Christian population, led by Bosnian Serbs. Initially a revolt against overtaxation by Bosnian Muslim landowners, it spread to a wider rebellion against the Ottoman rulers, with Bosnian Serbs vying for unity with Serbia. The Ottoman authorities were unable to contain the rebellion and it soon spread to other regions of the empire, with the Principality of Serbia joining and the Russian Empire doing the same, resulting in the Russo-Turkish War which Ottomans eventually lost. After the Congress of Berlin in 1878, Austria-Hungary was granted the right to occupy and administer Bosnia and Herzegovina, with the Principality of Serbia and the Principality of Montenegro (both of which had gained full independence at the Congress) deeply dissatisfied with the decision, as were the Bosnian Serbs. All three viewed the Austro-Hungarian occupation as a blatant thwarting of Serbian national aspirations, especially since Bosnia and Herzegovina had a large Serb population that constituted the single largest ethnic group and formed an absolute majority in many regions, particularly in eastern and northwestern Bosnia and across much of Herzegovina.

=== Austro-Hungarian rule ===
Austro-Hungarian rule initially resulted in a fragmentation between the citizenry of Bosnia and Herzegovina, as technically they were subjects of the Ottomans while the land belonged to Austria-Hungary. The Austro-Hungarian administration advocated the ideal of a pluralist and multi-confessional Bosnian nation. Joint Imperial Minister of Finance and Vienna-based administrator of Bosnia Béni Kállay thus endorsed Bosnian nationalism in the form of Bošnjaštvo ("Bosniakhood") with the aim to inspire in Bosnia's people "a feeling that they belong to a great and powerful nation".

The Austro-Hungarians viewed Bosnians as "speaking the Bosnian language and divided into three religions with equal rights." On the one hand, these policies attempted to insulate Bosnia and Herzegovina from its irredentist neighbors (Eastern Orthodox Serbia, Catholic Croatia, and the Muslim Ottoman Empire) and to marginalize the already circulating ideas of Serbian and Croatian nationhood among Bosnia's Orthodox and Catholic communities, respectively. On the other hand, the Habsburg administrators precisely used the existing ideas of nationhood (especially Bosnian folklore and symbolism) in order to promote their own version of Bošnjak patriotism that aligned with loyalty to the Habsburg state. Habsburg policies are thus best described not as anti-national, but as cultivating their own style of pro-imperial nationalisms. These policies also heightened divisions along national and religious lines. Bosnian Serbs felt oppressed by the Austro-Hungarians who favored Catholicism, and in turn the Croat population, who were the only members of the three constituent groups with any loyalty to the empire. After the death of Kallay, the policy was abandoned.

By 1905, nationalism was an integral factor of Bosnian politics, with national political parties corresponding to the three ethnic groups dominating elections. Austro-Hungarian authorities banned textbooks printed in Serbia and a number of other Serbian-language books they deemed to carry nationalistic content. A number of Bosnian Serb cultural and national organizations were formed in the early 20th century, one of which was the Prosvjeta. The Austro-Hungarian empire would wind up annexing the territory in 1908.

The first parliamentary elections to elect members to the Diet of Bosnia were held in 1910. The population was classified according to their ethno-religious status and each group was given its share of seats in the parliament according to their population. As the majority, the Serb representation was won by the Serb National Organization, who received 31 seats.

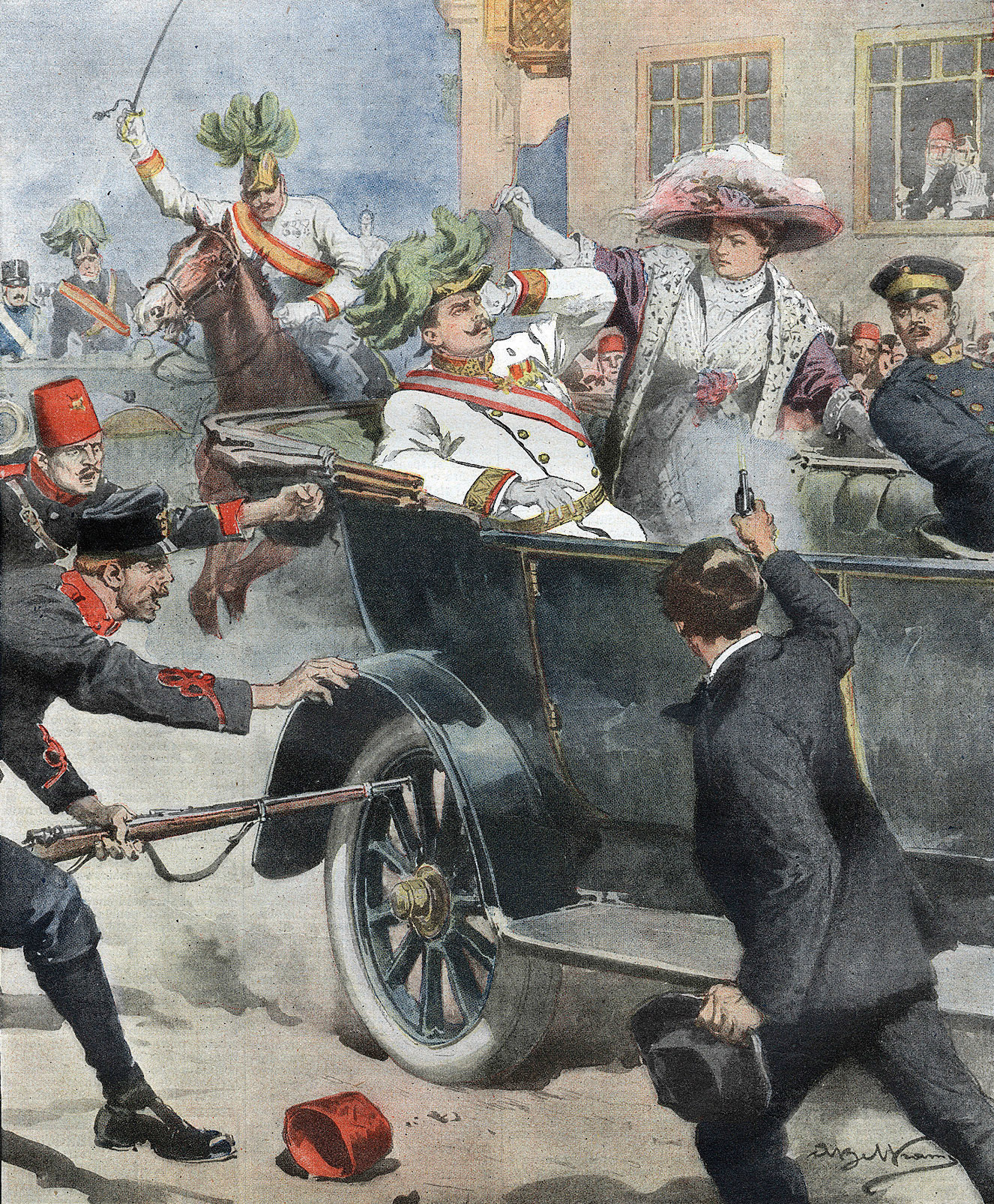
The front page of an Italian La Domenica del Corriere, with a drawing depicting Gavrilo Princip killing Archduke Franz Ferdinand in Sarajevo, 1914

On June 28, 1914, Bosnian Serb Gavrilo Princip made international headlines after assassinating Archduke Franz Ferdinand and his wife Sophie in Sarajevo. This sparked World War I leading to Austria-Hungary's defeat and the incorporation of Bosnia and Herzegovina into the Kingdom of Yugoslavia.

During World War I, Serbs in Bosnia were often blamed for the outbreak of the war, the assassination of Archduke Franz Ferdinand, and were subjected to persecution by the Austro-Hungarian authorities, including internment and looting of their businesses, by people who were instigated to ethnic violence. Early in the war, the Austro-Hungarian authorities unleashed a persecution of Bosnian Serbs, which included the internment of thousands in camps, court-martialling and death sentencing of intellectuals, massacres by the Schutzkorps, looting of property and forced expulsions.

Bosnian Serbs served in the Austro-Hungarian Army during the World War I: on the Italian front they generally remained loyal and fought reliably, however, when deployed to the Serbian or later Macedonian front, large numbers deserted, often crossing the lines to join the Serbian army. Significant number of Bosnian and Herzegovinian Serbs served in Montenegrin and Serbian armies as well since they felt loyalty to the overall pan-Serbian cause.

=== Kingdom of Yugoslavia ===
After World War I, Bosnia and Herzegovina became part of the internationally unrecognized State of Slovenes, Croats and Serbs which existed between October and December 1918. In December 1918, this state united with the Kingdom of Serbia as Kingdom of Serbs, Croats, and Slovenes.

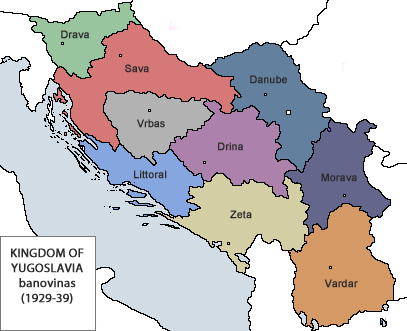
Banovinas of the Kingdom of Yugoslavia (1929–1939)

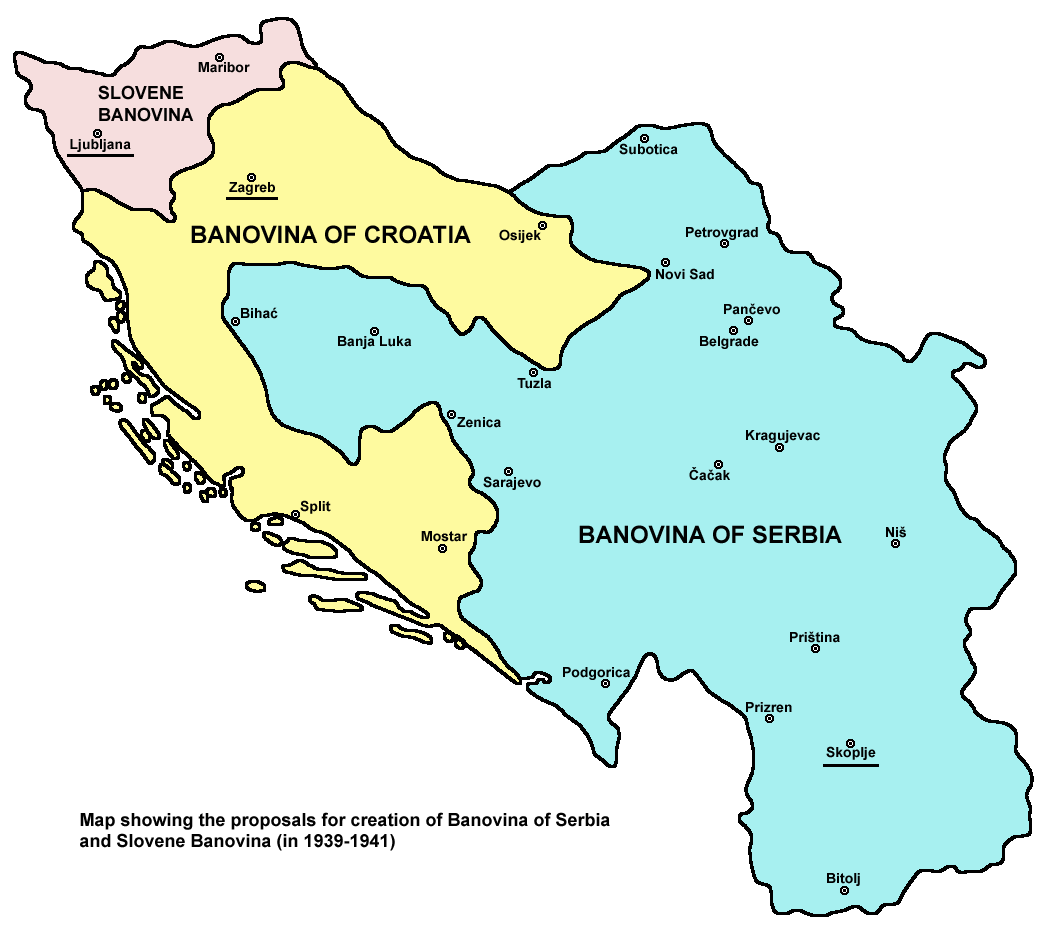
Map with proposed Banovina of Serbia, Banovina of Croatia (eventually created), and Slovene Banovina (1939–1941)

Bosnian Serbs overwhelmingly welcomed unification with Serbia, seeing it as the fulfilment of their long-standing national aspiration, the gathering of all Serbs into a single state. However, part of the Bosnian Serb population were unsatisfied given the fact that there was not a formal establishment between Bosnia and Herzegovina and Serbia. Bosnian Muslims saw the new arrangement as a form of colonial rule and instead argued for a decentralized unitary state with autonomy rights for constituents. Bosnian Croats meanwhile supported the federalization of Yugoslavia into six units, one of which was to be Bosnia and Herzegovina. In order to secure Bosnian Muslim political support, the Serbian-dominated government of the newly formed state accepted the principal demand of the leading Bosnian Muslim politician Mehmed Spaho and the Yugoslav Muslim Organization: it pledged to respect the historical and territorial integrity of Bosnia and Herzegovina and did not redraw the province’s pre-war borders in the 1922-1924 administrative reform. This lasted until 1929 when King Alexander declared a dictatorship. The Kingdom was renamed the Kingdom of Yugoslavia, divided into new territorial entities called banovinas, largely based on natural borders. Bosnia and Herzegovina was divided into four banovinas, with Serbs constituting a majority in three of them. King Alexander was assassinated in 1934, which led to the end of dictatorship.

Faced with killings, corruption scandals, violence and the failure of centralized policy, the Serbian leadership of the country agreed a compromise with Croats. The compromise was based on the following broad principles: banovinas would eventually evolve later into the final proposal for the territorial partition into three parts or three banovinas (one Slovene banovina, one Croatian and one Serb, with each covering most of the traditional ethnic territory of the respective group) with most of the territory of contemporary Bosnia and Herzegovina to be incorporated into proposed Serb Banovina/Banovina Serbia, reflecting the fact that Serbs formed the largest single ethnic group in Bosnia nad Herzegovina as a whole and constituted an absolute majority in the east, north-west, and much of Herzegovina. In 1939, the prime minister of Yugoslavia, Dragiša Cvetković (ethnic Serb), and president of the Croatian Peasant Party, Vladko Maček, reached the agreement according to which a Banovina of Croatia was created which included most of Herzegovina, and parts of central and northern Bosnia. The Cvetković-Maček Agreement failed to satisfy key demands on either side: many Croats regarded the concessions as insufficient, while Serbs felt aggrieved that no equivalent Serbian banovina had been created. Bosnian Muslims, for their part, were neither consulted nor offered any territorial or administrative alternative of their own.

Competing ideologies among Serbs and Croats and their influences on Bosnia and Herzegovina, and to a broader extent, a lack of agreement on inter-ethnic relations in the new Yugoslav state and its governance resulted in perpetual instability. Yugoslavia however would only collapse after the Nazi Germany invasion of the country in April 1941, which dismembered the country into three different zones of occupation.

=== World War II ===
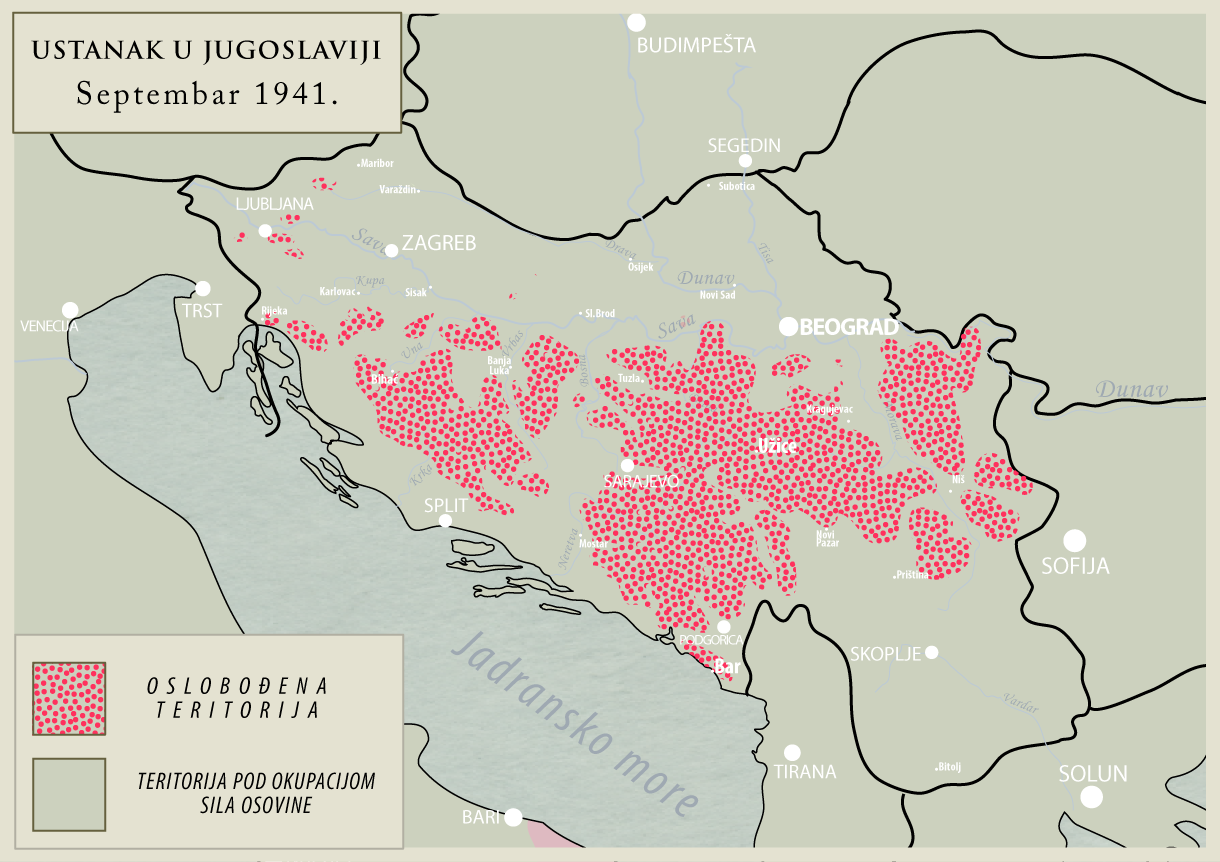
The uprising against Axis occupation began first and spread most rapidly in Serb-populated regions, particularly in Serb-populated areas of Bosnia and Herzegovina, which emerged as the strongholds of armed resistance.

Following the Nazi invasion of Yugoslavia, the territory of Bosnia and Herzegovina was incorporated into the Independent State of Croatia, an Italian-German installed puppet state governed by the Croatian fascist Ustaše regime under Ante Pavelić. Serbs together with Jews and Roma, became victims and primary and most numerous target of a deliberate policy of genocide. In rural areas, Serbs were brutally massacred: hacked to death with axes and knives or thrown alive into pits and ravines.

According to the US Holocaust Museum, 320,000–340,000 Serbs were murdered under Ustasha regime, of which an estimated 209,000 Bosnian Serbs or 16.9% of Bosnian Serb population were killed. The experience had a profound impact in the collective memory of Serbs in Croatia and Bosnia. The intensity of the Ustaše-led genocide and mass violence was such that roughly one in six Serbs in Bosnia and Herzegovina perished, and virtually every Serb family in the region lost at least one member. Others were sent to concentration camps. The Kruščica concentration camp, located near the town of Vitez in central Bosnia, was established in April 1941 for Serb and Jewish women and children. In August 1941, Ustaše forces massacred between 650 and 850 Serb civilians (mostly women and children) from the village of Prebilovci in Herzegovina by throwing them alive into the pit near the village of Šurmanci and later dynamiting the site, making it one of the most brutal single atrocities against Serbs during World War II.

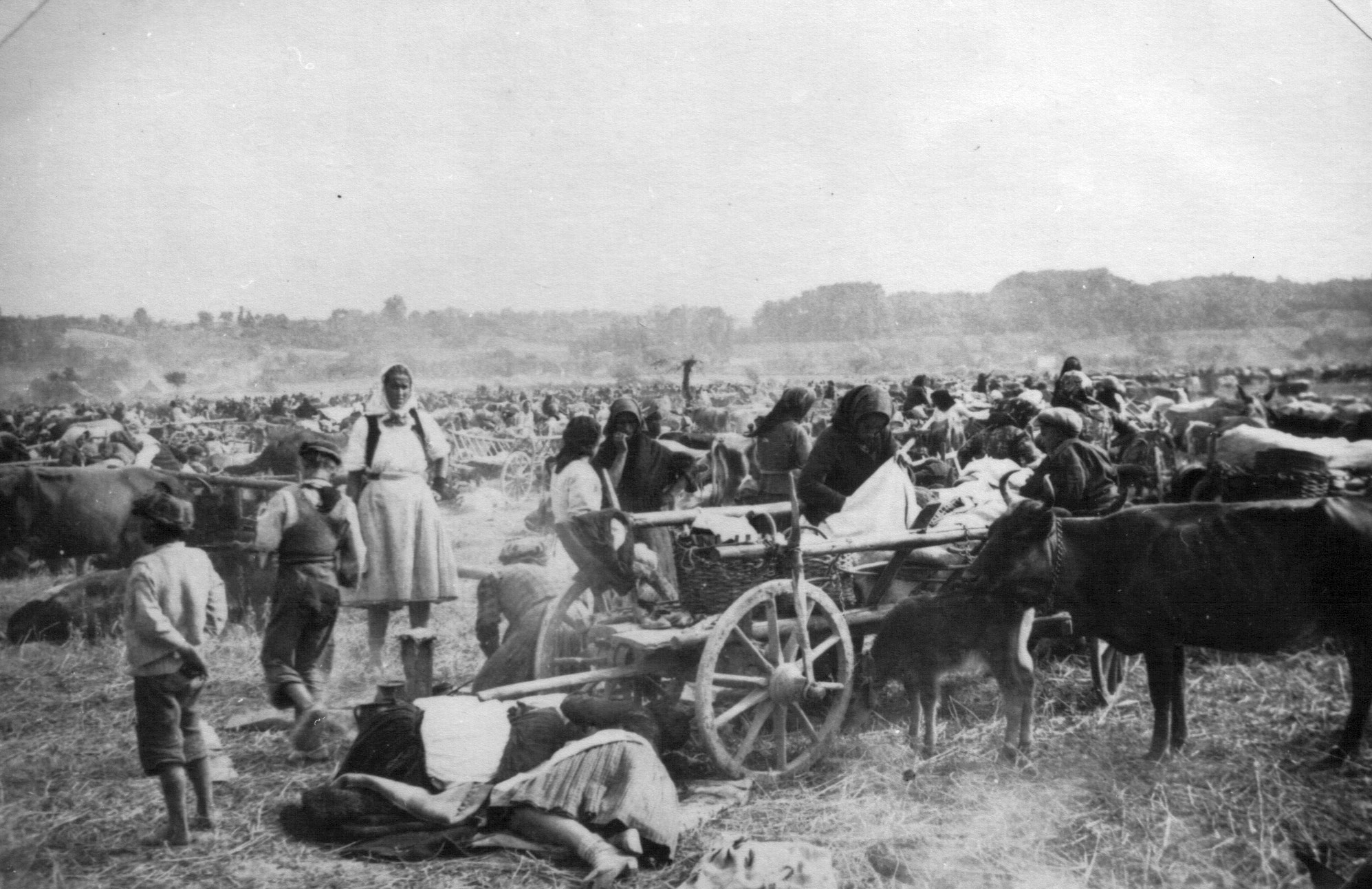
Serb villagers taking refuge in the mountain of Kozara, following the Kozara Offensive carried out by Nazi German and Ustaša forces

The genocidal policies of the Ustaše regime provoked a massive and sustained Serbian insurection. In June 1941, Serbs in eastern Herzegovina staged an armed rebellion against the authorities of the Independent State of Croatia, which was suppressed after two weeks. Persecution of Serbs resulted in the prevalence of resistance movements in Serb-populated areas. Another rebellion, led by the Partisans, began on July 27, 1941. Some of these insurgents in turn committed atrocities against the Muslim and Croat population.

In the broader Yugoslav context, multi-ethnic resistance movement, the Yugoslav Partisans led by Josip Broz Tito, emerged to fight the Axis occupation. Simultaneously, a predominantly Serb nationalist and royalist guerrilla force known as the Chetniks was formed under Draža Mihailović; although it began as an anti-Axis resistance movement, it later shifted toward increasing collaboration with the occupying powers. Serb allegiance was split between the Partisans and Chetniks, although Serbs in western Bosnia aligned themselves more with the Partisans who experienced military success in the area. In the early stages of the war, Serbs formed around 90% of Partisan units that were active on the territories of the Independent State of Croatia with most of the combat fought in Serb-populated areas, such as the Battle of Neretva, Battle of Sutjeska, Drvar Operation, and Kozara Offensive. According to postwar Yugoslav records of recipients of veterans' pensions, 64.1% of all Partisans from Bosnia and Herzegovina were ethnic Serbs. The Partisans liberated Sarajevo on 6 April 1945 and Bosnia came under full control a few weeks later.

=== Socialist Yugoslavia ===
After World War II, Bosnia and Herzegovina became one of the six constituent republics of the People's Federal Republic of Yugoslavia. Following the post-war expulsion of ethnic Germans from Serbian province of Vojvodina, the Yugoslav communist government launched a state-sponsored colonization program, peaking between 1945 and 1948, that resettled tens of thousands of ethnic Serbs from Bosanska Krajina and Herzegovina to Vojvodina. The 1968 constitutional amendments officially recognized Bosnian Muslims as a distinct ethnicity thus elevating them to equal status alongside Serbs and Croats. Throughout the 1960s and 1970s, Bosnia and Herzegovina was often presented as a “Yugoslavia in miniature,” with power-sharing mechanisms among the three constituent nations and a relatively high degree of inter-ethnic coexistence.

=== Bosnian War ===
Following Slovenia and Croatia's declaration of independence in June 1991, Bosnia and Herzegovina was faced with the dilemma of whether to stay in the Yugoslav federation or seek independence. Independence was strongly supported by the majority of Bosniaks and Croats but firmly opposed by most Bosnian Serbs. On 15 October 1991, the Parliament Bosnia and Herzegovina adopted a Memorandum on Sovereignty, prompting Bosnian Serb deputies to walk out in protest and effectively boycott the assembly thereafter. Soon afterwards Serb deputies formed the Assembly of the Serb People of Bosnia and Herzegovina declaring that the Serb people wished to remain in Yugoslavia. In January 1992, the Bosnian Serbs proclaimed the "Republic of the Serb People in Bosnia-Herzegovina" (renamed Republika Srpska in August 1992). The Bosnian referendum, held on 29 February-1 March 1992, produced an overwhelming 99.7% vote in favor of independence, but with a turnout of only 63.4%, owing to a near-total boycott by Bosnian Serbs. Following Bosnia's declaration of independence, violent skirmishes eventually broke out into full-scale war by April 1992.

Bosnian Serb forces, reorganized into the Army of Republika Srpska, backed by Serbia, quickly seized roughly 70% of the territory of Bosnia and Herzegovina. Fighting took place on three main fronts: Bosniak forces against Bosnian Serb forces, Bosniak forces against Bosnian Croat forces (throughout 1993), and a fluctuating alliance between Bosniaks and Croats before and after the 1994 Washington Agreement. The war ended after NATO bombing campaign against Bosnian Serb forces, which led to peace talks and the signing of the Dayton Agreement in November 1995. The agreement divided Bosnia and Herzegovina into two entities, the Federation of Bosnia and Herzegovina and Republika Srpska, while keeping the country internationally recognized as a single state.

== Demographics ==
According to data from the 2013 census, 1,086,733 people in Bosnia and Herzegovina identified as ethnic Serbs, i.e. 30.8% of total population, forming the second largest ethnic group after Bosniaks. The vast majority, i.e. 92.1% of Serbs live in Republika Srpska where they form 81.5% of entity's population. There were 56,550 Serbs in the Federation of Bosnia and Herzegovina (2.5% of entity's population) and additional 28,884 in the Brčko District (34.6% of district's population).

During World War II, in the initial wave of terror alone (May–August 1941), over 200,000 Serbs were expelled across the border into German-occupied Serbia. By the end of war, an additional 137,000 Serbs had left Bosnia and Herzegovina. The displacement and losses suffered during World War II were further compounded by the post-war state-sponsored resettlement of 76,000 ethnic Serbs from Bosanska Krajina and Herzegovina to Vojvodina. The Federal Statistics Institute of Yugoslavia recorded a total of 179,173 people killed in Bosnia and Herzegovina during the war among which 129,114 were ethnic Serbs (72.1%), 29,539 Bosnian Muslims (16.5%), 7,850 Croats (4.4%).

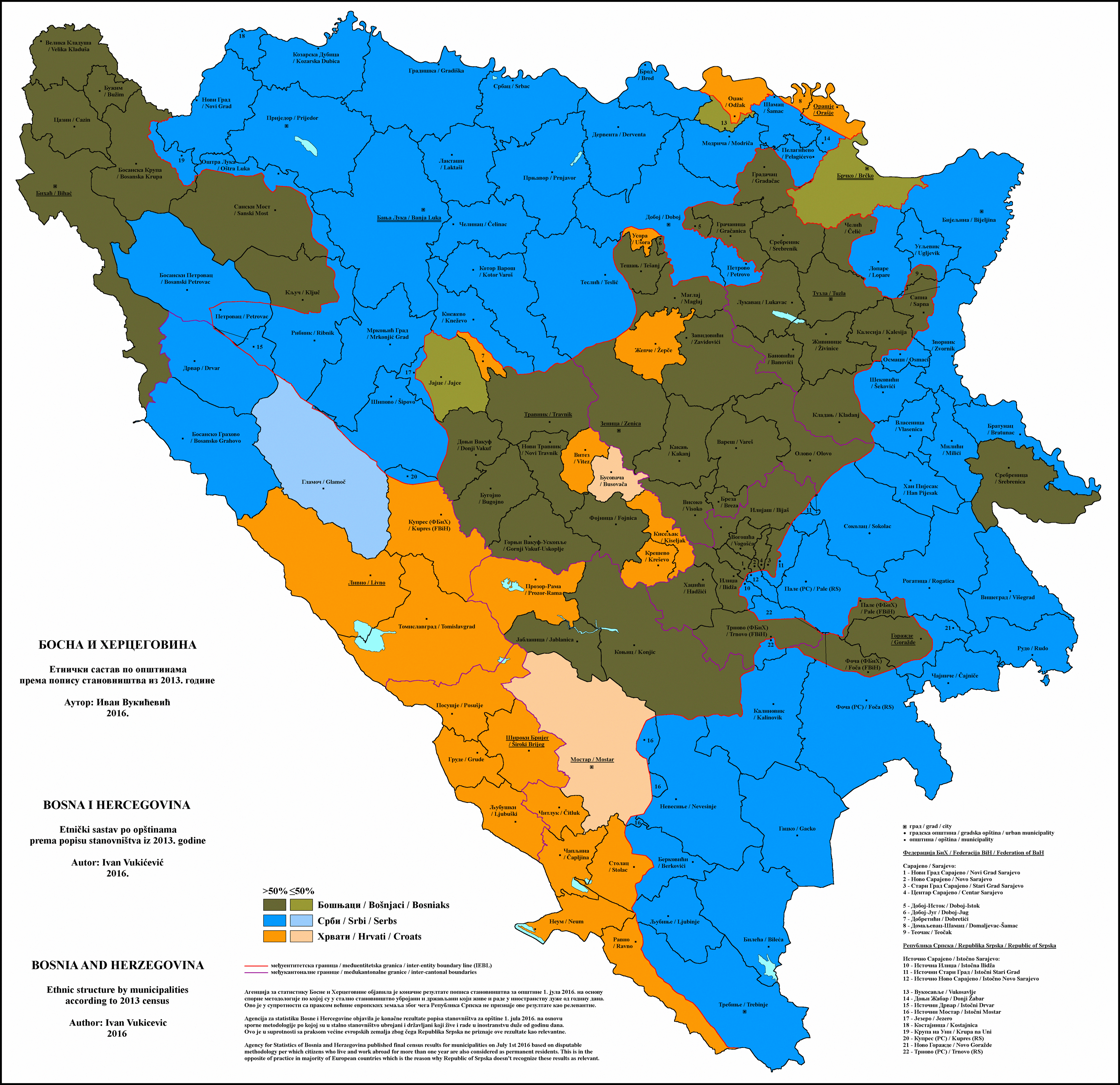
Ethnic map of Bosnia and Herzegovina by municipalities, 2013

Year	Population	Share
1851	485,800	45%
1870	550,256	36.4%
1879	496,485	42.9%
1885	571,250	42.7%
1895	673,246	42.9%
1910	825,418	43.5%
1921	829,290	43.8%
1931	1,028,139	44.2%
1948	1,136,116	44.3%
1953	1,261,405	44.4%
1961	1,406,057	42.9%
1971	1,393,148	37.2%
1981	1,320,644 or 1,320,738	32%
1991	1,369,258 or 1,366,104	31.2%
2013	1,086,733	30.8%

Serbs in Bosnia and Herzegovina belong to the Eastern Orthodoxy and are adherents of the Serbian Orthodox Church. Five dioceses of the Serbian Orthodox Church have jurisdiction over the territory of Bosnia and Herezegovina: one metropolitanate and four eparchies. Metropolitanate of Dabar and Bosnia was founded in 1220 by Saint Sava as the Eparchy of Dabar which stretched into Bosnia; after the restoration of the Serbian Patriarchate of Peć in 1557, it became the Eparchy of Dabar and Bosnia, eventually gaining the status of metropolitanate. In 1611, the Eparchy of Hum was split into two regions before consolidating into the Eparchy of Zachlumia, Herzegovina, and the Littoral in 18th century. Around 1532, an Orthodox episcopate was established in Zvornik and transferred to Tuzla in 1852, becoming the Eparchy of Zvornik and Tuzla. The Eparchy of Banja Luka was formed in 1900 while the Eparchy of Bihać and Petrovac was originally established in 1925, abolished in 1934, and re-established in 1990.

== Politics ==
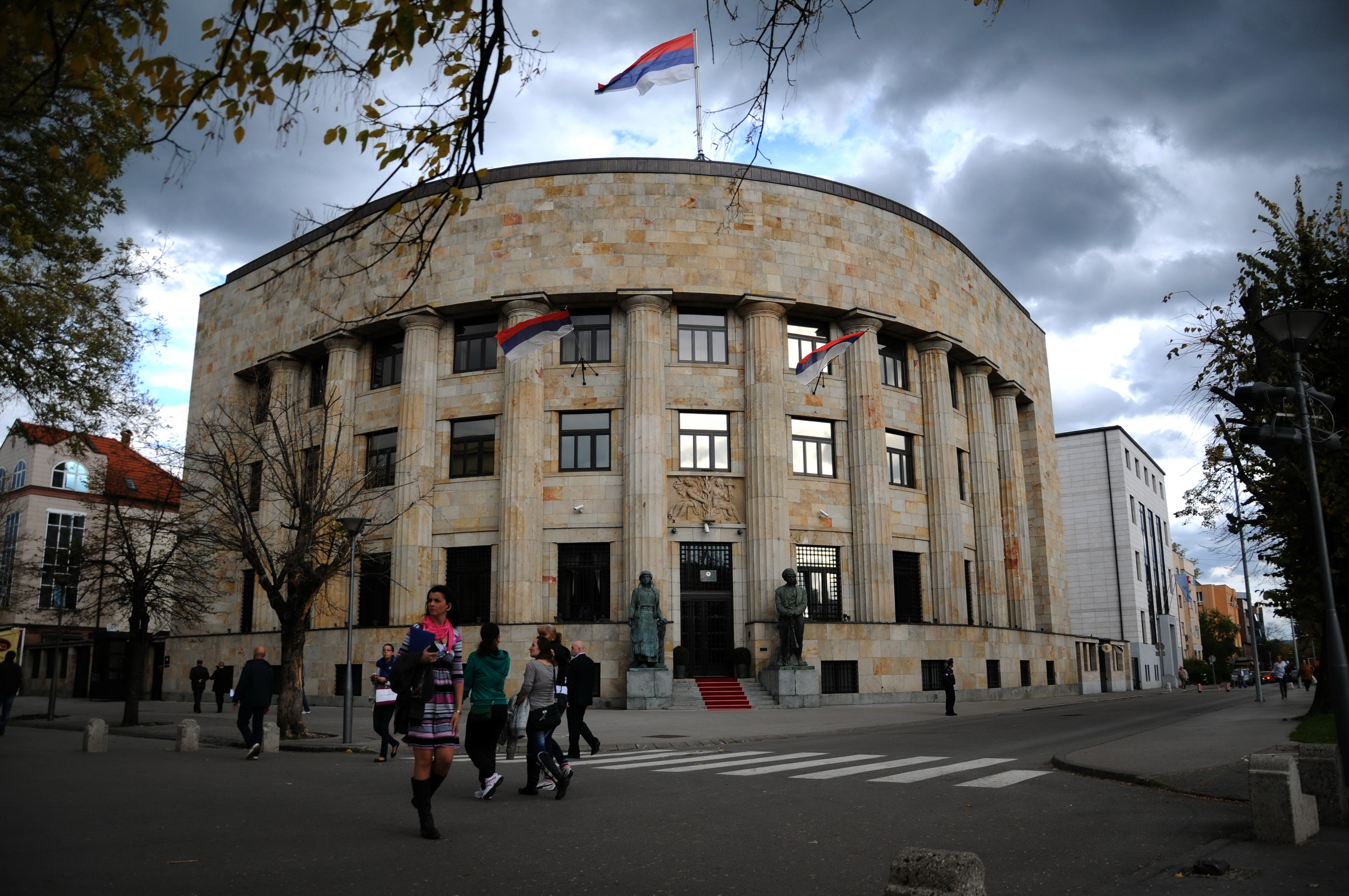
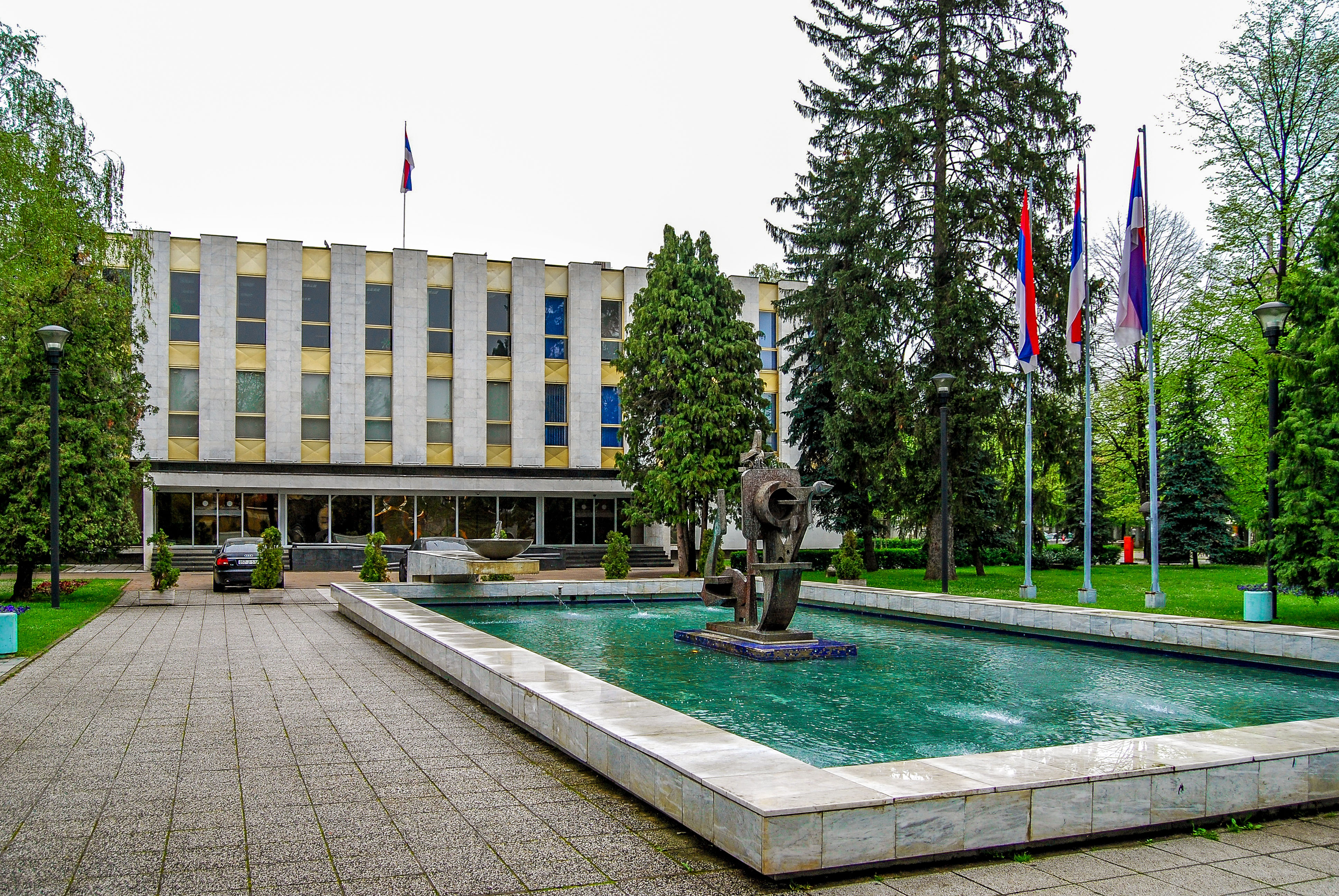
Left: Palace of the Republic, seat of the President of Republika Srpska
Right: Building of the National Assembly of Republika Srpska

Bosnia and Herzegovina operates under a complex consociational system established by the Dayton Agreement, which ended the Bosnian War. This framework recognizes Bosniaks, Serbs, and Croats as "constituent peoples" with equal rights, including mechanisms for ethnic representation. At its core, the system aims to prevent dominance by any ethnic group via power-sharing, but it often leads to gridlock due to veto mechanisms and ethnic vetoes on "vital national interests".

Serbs exercise significant political influence primarily through the Republika Srpska entity, which covers roughly half of country's territory and is predominantly Serb-inhabited. Republika Srpska enjoys one of the broadest sets of prerogatives and competencies of any subnational entity in Europe with powers that in many respects resemble those of a sovereign state rather than a purely subnational entity. It independently performs all functions except in those matters expressly assigned to the state institutions of Bosnia and Herzegovina, including: education, healthcare, police, judiciary, taxation, economic policy, spatial planning, culture, and media. Republika Srpska has its own constitution, parliament, president, government, separate judicial system, police force, as well as its own symbols (flag, anthem, and emblem).

== Culture ==
The culture of Serbs in Bosnia and Herzegovina is an integral part of broader Serbian cultural heritage. Although sharing the core elements of Serbian culture elsewhere, it has developed distinct regional traits shaped by the Dinaric landscape and historical experience within a multi-ethnic environment.

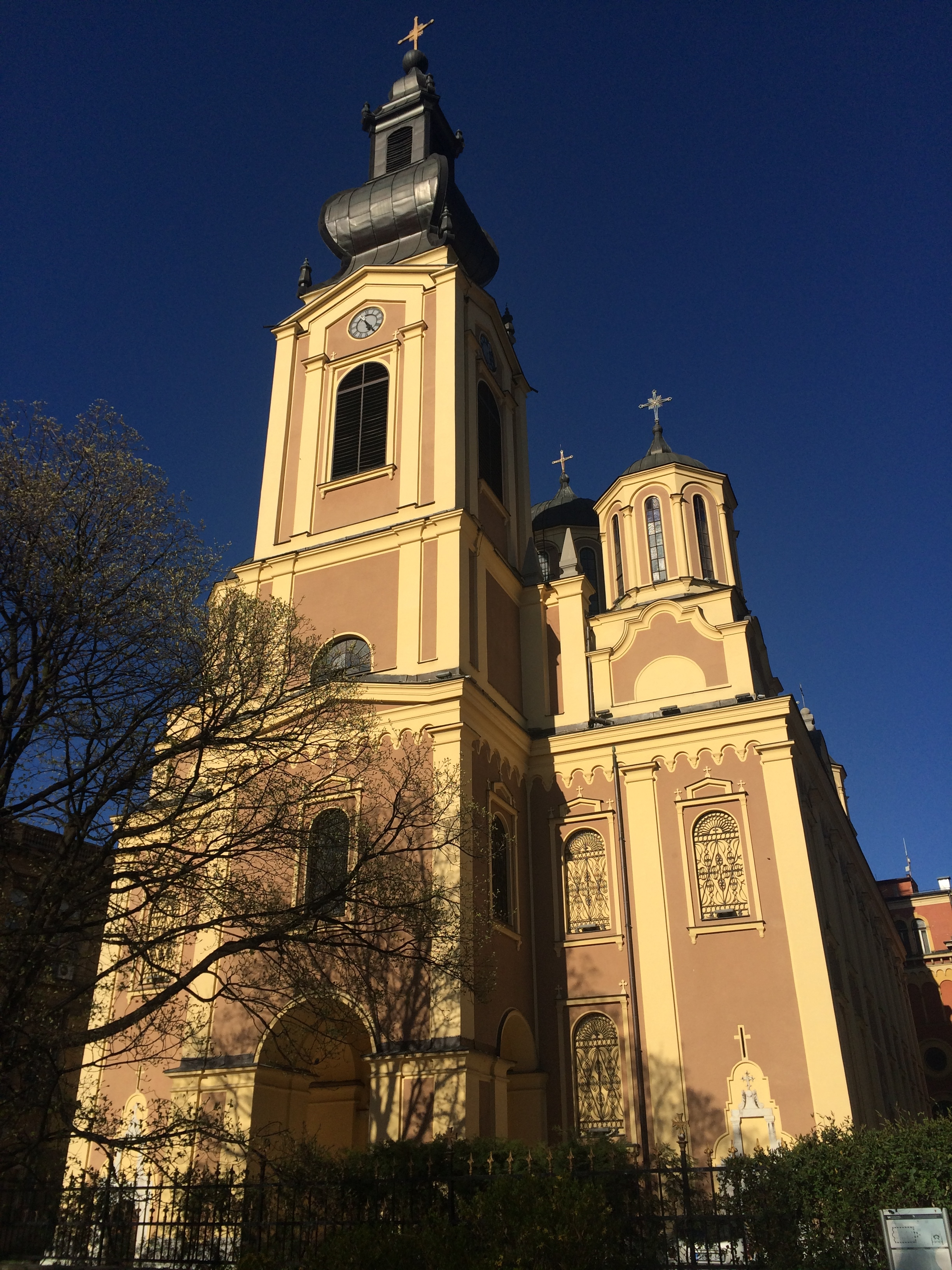
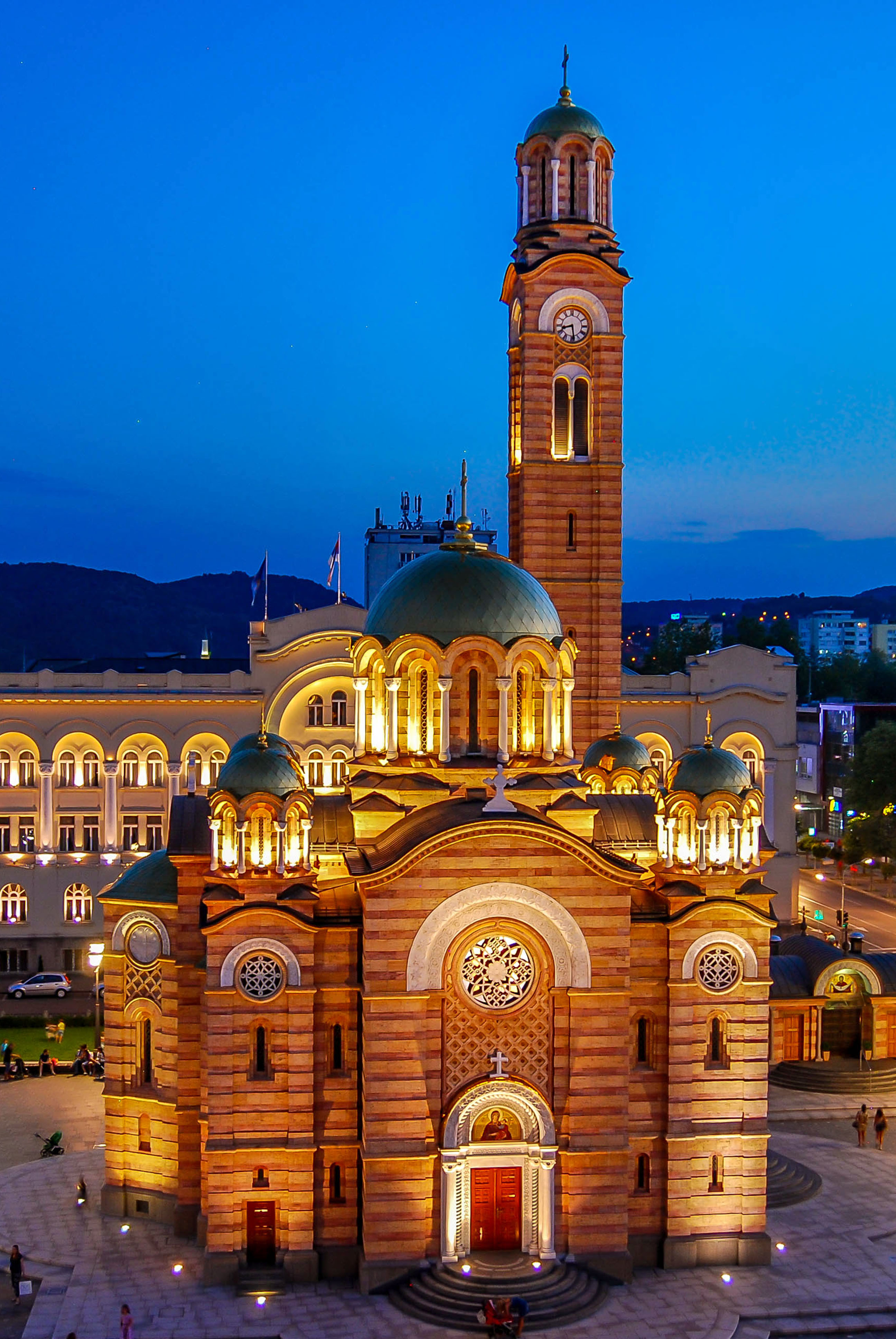
Left: Cathedral of the Nativity of the Theotokos in Sarajevo
Right: Cathedral of Christ the Saviour in Banja Luka

Bosnia and Herzegovina is rich in Serbian architecture, especially when it comes to numerous Serbian churches and monasteries, ranging from late medieval foundations (Tavna, Ozren, Tvrdoš, Žitomislić) to 19th- and 20th-century churches built in both the Baroque (such as the Cathedral of the Nativity of the Theotokos in Sarajevo and Holy Trinity Cathedral in Mostar) or Serbo-Byzantine style (such as the Cathedral of Christ the Saviour in Banja Luka and Hercegovačka Gračanica in Trebinje). Many churches preserve valuable iconostases and frescoes; the treasury of the Church of the Holy Archangels Michael and Gabriel in Sarajevo is considered one of the five richest collections of Orthodox icons and liturgical objects in the world.

The Serbs of Bosnia and Herzegovina speak the Eastern Herzegovinian dialect of Serbian language, characterized by the Ijekavian pronunciation. Traces of Serbian language on this territory are very old as in old inscriptions such as Grdeša's tombstone, the oldest known stećak. The Serbian language possesses a rich corpus of medieval gospels produced in the territory of present-day Bosnia and Herzegovina, many of which are distinguished by their exquisite miniature illuminations, the most important one being the Miroslav Gospel, commissioned by the Serbian Prince Miroslav of Hum and widely regarded as the most beautiful and artistically valuable Serbian medieval book.

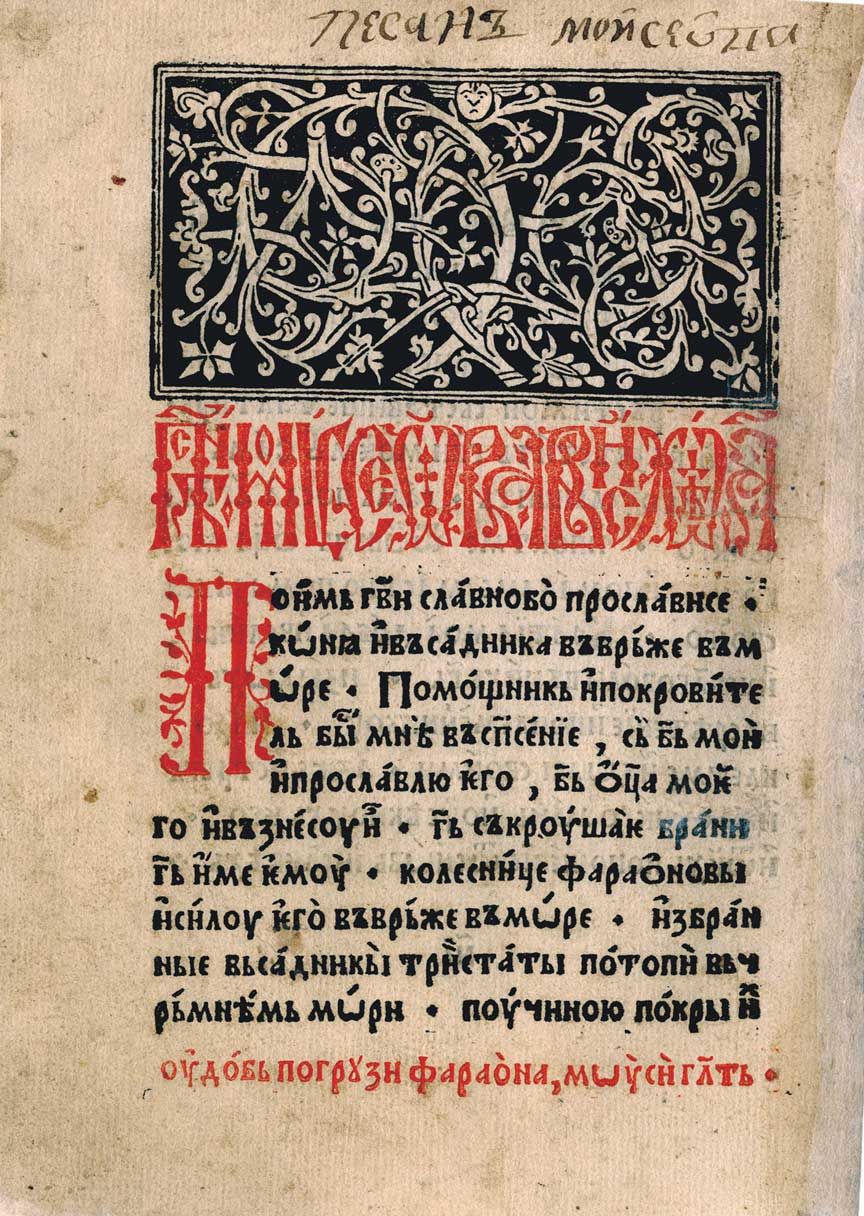
Goražde Psalter, 1521

In the early 16th century the Goražde printing house was founded, one of the earliest printing houses among the Serbs, and the first in the territory of present-day Bosnia and Herzegovina. Goražde Psalter printed there is counted among the better accomplishments of early Serb printers.

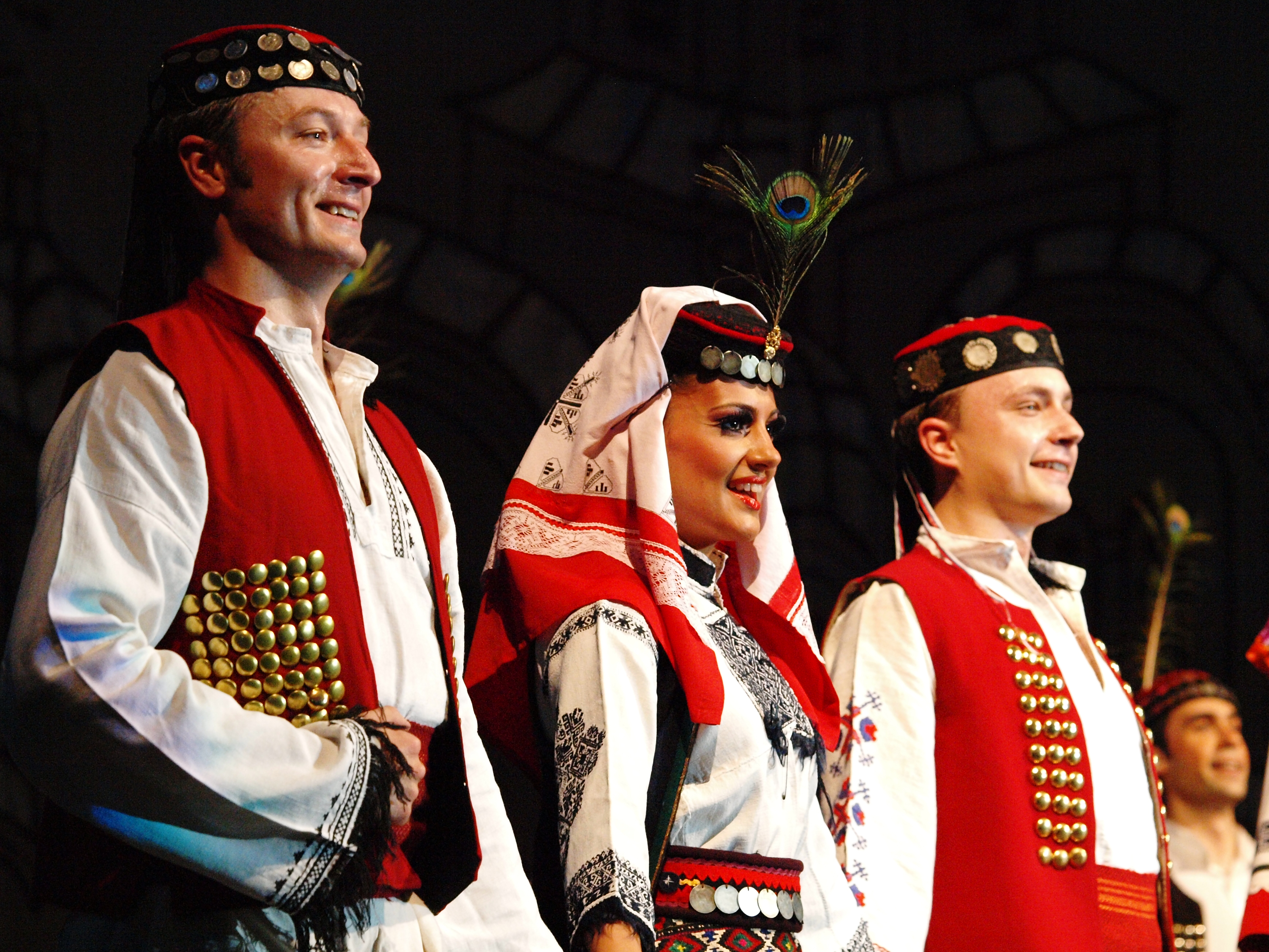
Traditional Serb folk costume from Grmeč

Beginning in the nineteenth century, Bosanska vila from Sarajevo and Zora from Mostar, were important literary magazines at the forefront of political and cultural issues.

Traditional instruments such as gusle, frula, and gajde, were utilized by the Serbs of Bosnia and Herzegovina for musical performances. The first Serb singing societies in Bosnia and Herzegovina were set up in Foča (1885), Tuzla (1886), Prijedor (1887), Mostar and Sarajevo (in 1888). The first concert in Bosnia and Herzegovina was held in Banja Luka in 1881. Serbian music is rich in folk songs of Serb people from Bosnia and Herzegovina. Many songs are performed in traditional way of singing called ojkanje.

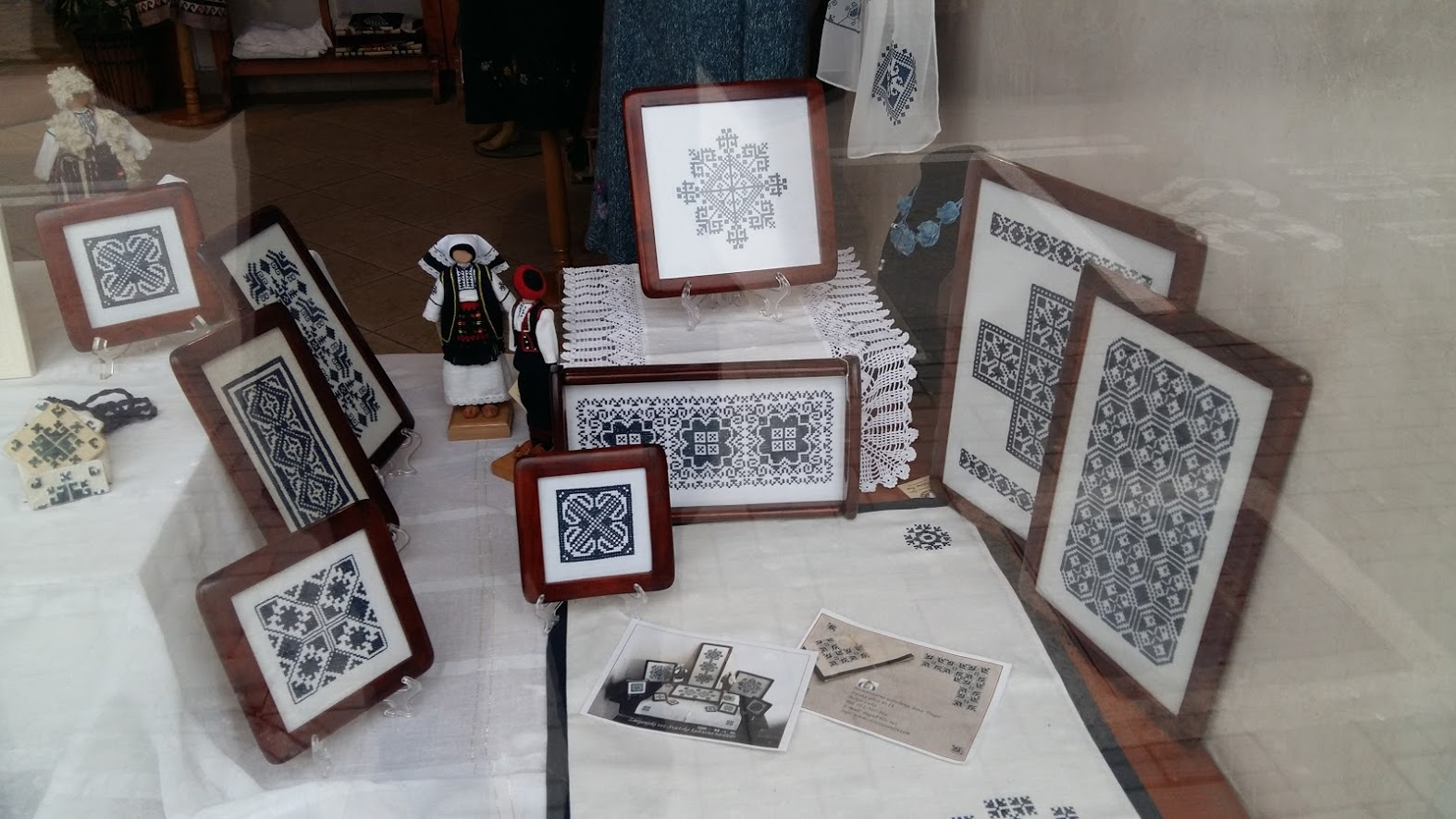
Zmijanje embroidery, UNESCO World Cultural heritage

The Serbs of Bosnia and Herzegovina have made substantial contributions to Serbian folk heritage, particularly in the areas of traditional costumes. Bosnian Serb folk costumes are generally classified into two main types: those of the Dinaric zone (predominant in most of Bosnia and Herzegovina) and the rarer Pannonian type (found in northern regions of Semberija and Posavina).

The Serb cultural and educational society Prosvjeta was founded in Sarajevo in 1902 and soon became the principal organisation uniting ethnic Serbs across Bosnia and Herzegovina. A separate Serb Muslim cultural society, Gajret, was founded the following year. The Academy of Sciences and Arts of the Republika Srpska, founded in 1996, is nowadays the highest scholarly institution among Serbs in Bosnia and Herzegovina.

In the absence of state schooling under Ottoman rule, literacy and basic education among Bosnian Serbs were predominantly transmitted through Serbian Orthodox monasteries and churches, where priests and monks fulfilled the role of educators. Upon the Austro-Hungarian occupation in 1878, Bosnia and Herzegovina had 56 Serbian Orthodox parish schools, a figure that rose to 107 by 1910. All were suppressed by the authorities during World War I and did not resume operation afterward.

The first girls' school was established in Sarajevo in 1858. Higher education in Republika Srpska is centered around two public universities: the University of Banja Luka, founded in 1975, and the University of East Sarajevo, established in 1992, and created from the faculties and infrastructure of the original University of Sarajevo that came under Republika Srpska control after the Bosnian War, effectively serving as its successor institution within the entity. The Orthodox Theological Faculty of St. Basil of Ostrog and the Orthodox Seminary of St. Peter of Dabar-Bosnia are the two Orthodox institutions of higher learning, both located in Foča, having historical continuity with the Sarajevo-Reljevo Theological Seminary that was founded in 1882, as the first Serbian high school in Bosnia.

The first Serbian Sokol sporting societies in present-day Bosnia and Herzegovina were founded in the late 19th century, including the gymnastics society Obilić in Mostar and the sports and gymnastics society Srpski Soko in Tuzla, with additional Sokol societies soon established in other cities across the country.

== Notable people ==
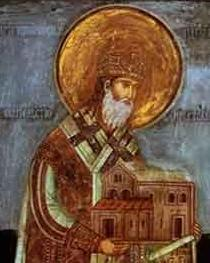
Makarije Sokolović

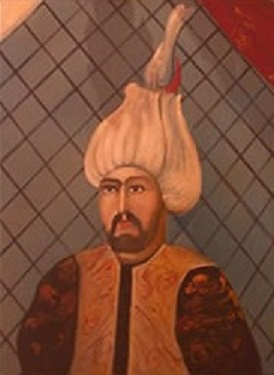
Mehmed-paša Sokolović

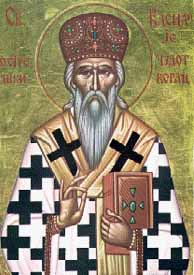
Basil of Ostrog

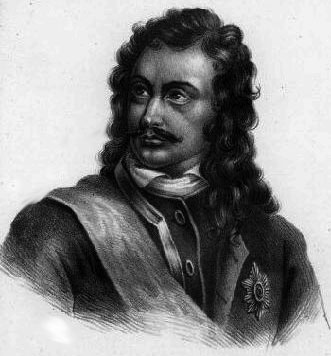
Sava Vladislavich

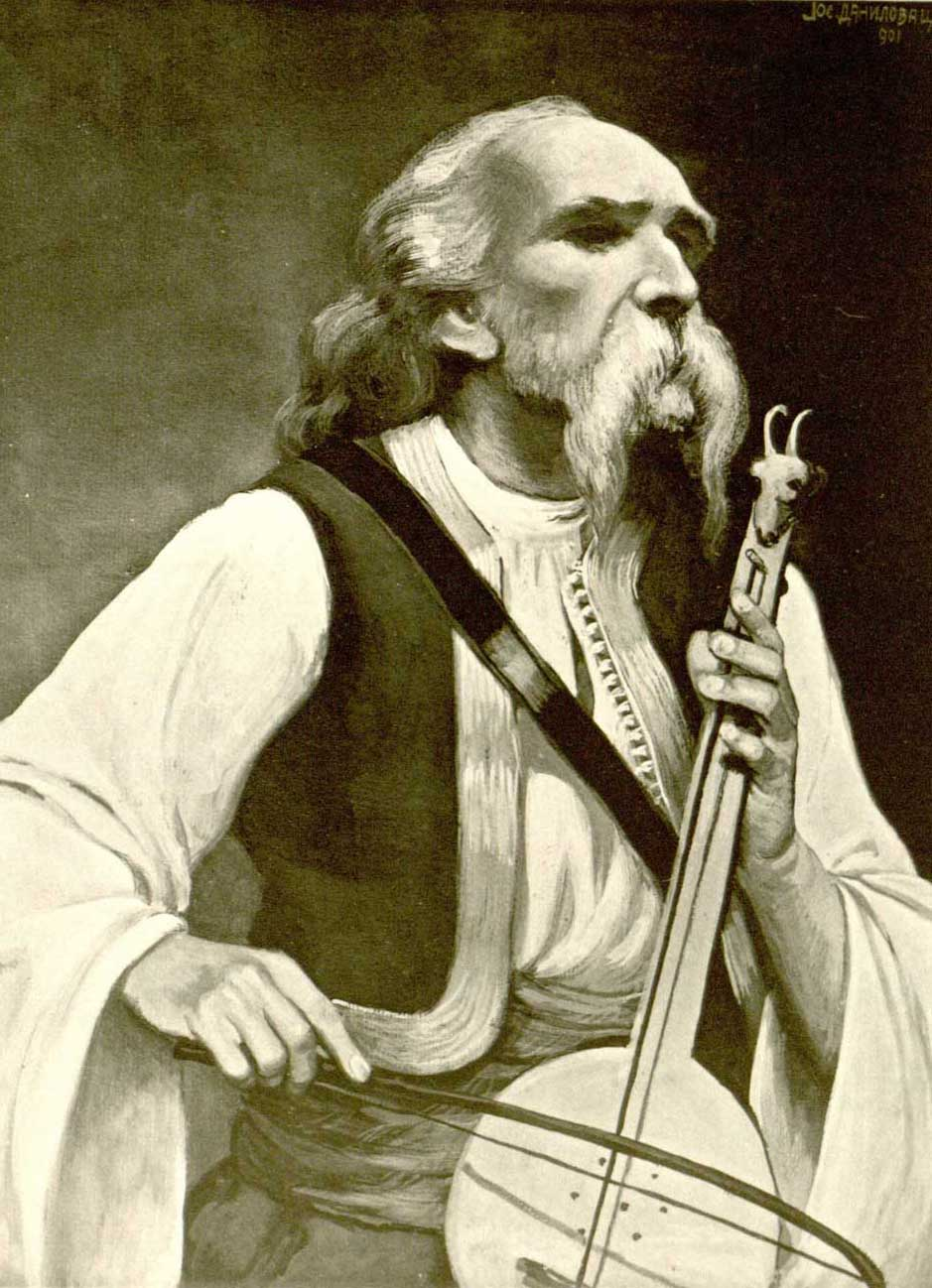
Filip Višnjić

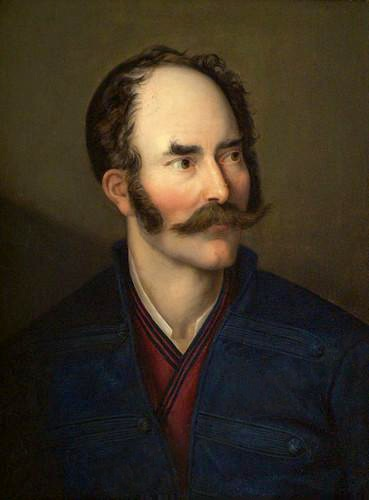
Sima Milutinović Sarajlija

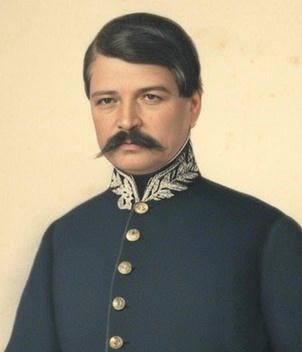
Jovan Marinović

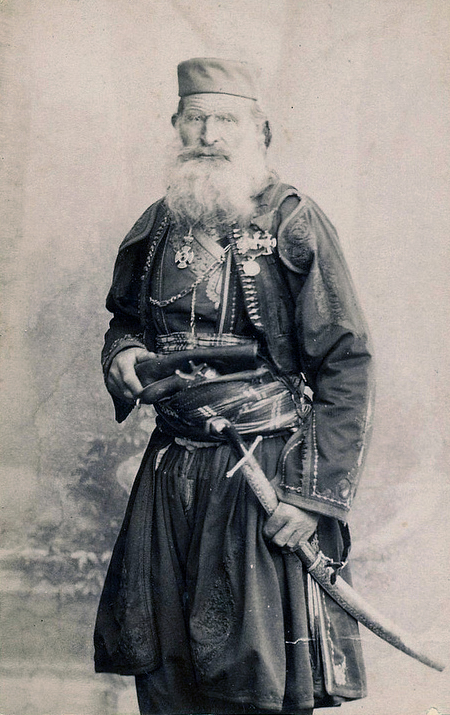
Bogdan Zimonjić

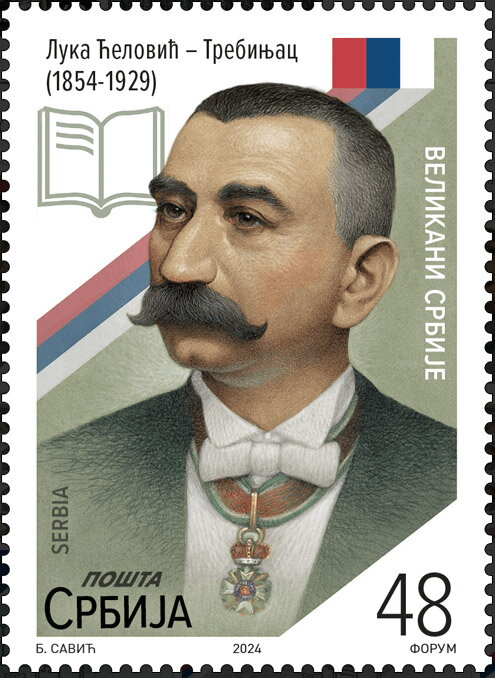
Luka Ćelović Trebinjac

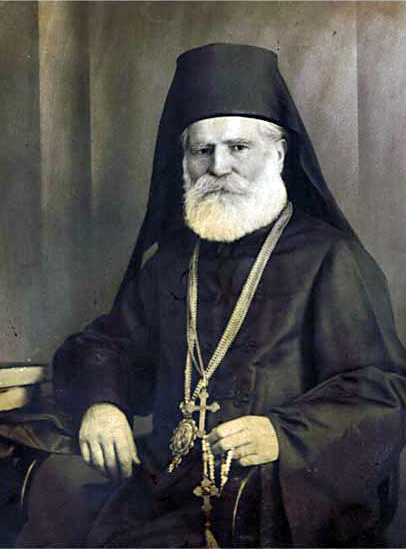
Petar Zimonjić

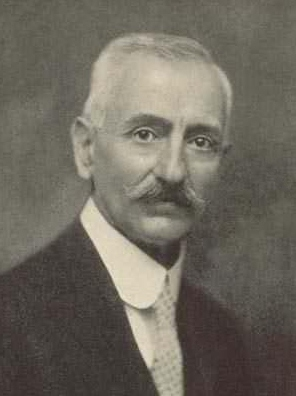
Aleksa Šantić

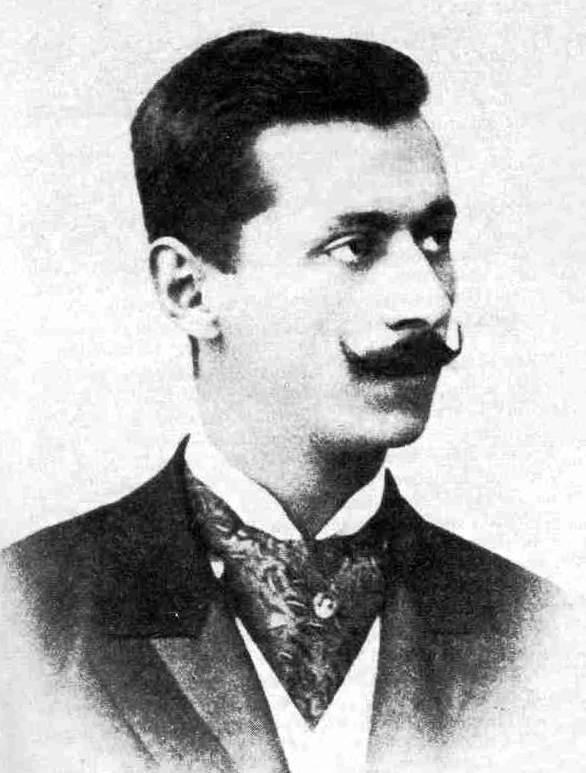
Jovan Dučić

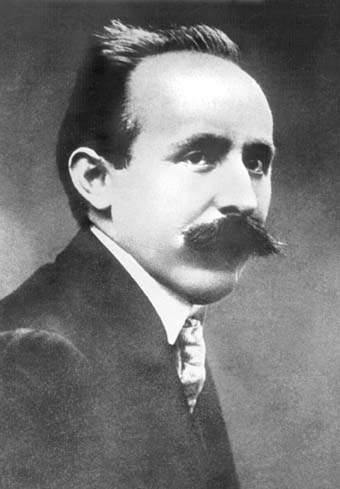
Petar Kočić

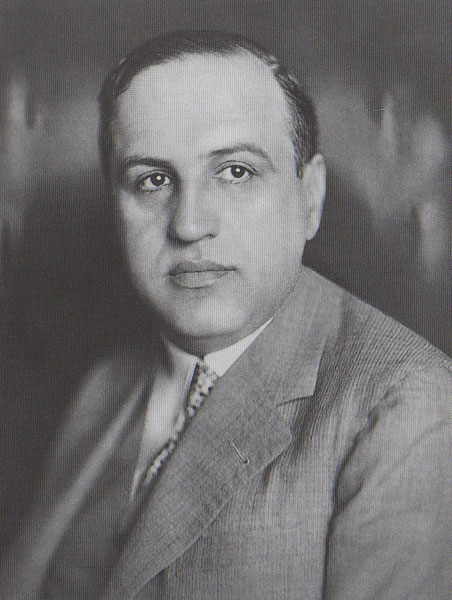
Vladimir Ćorović

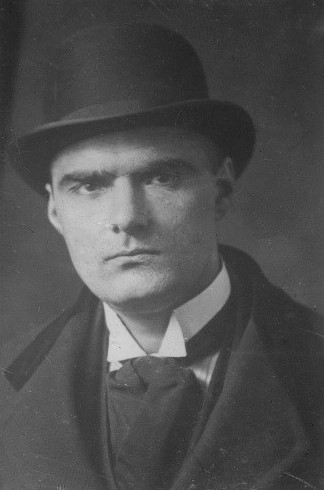
Dimitrije Mitrinović

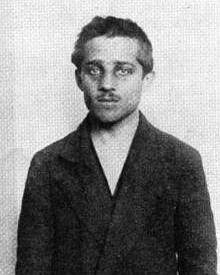
Gavrilo Princip

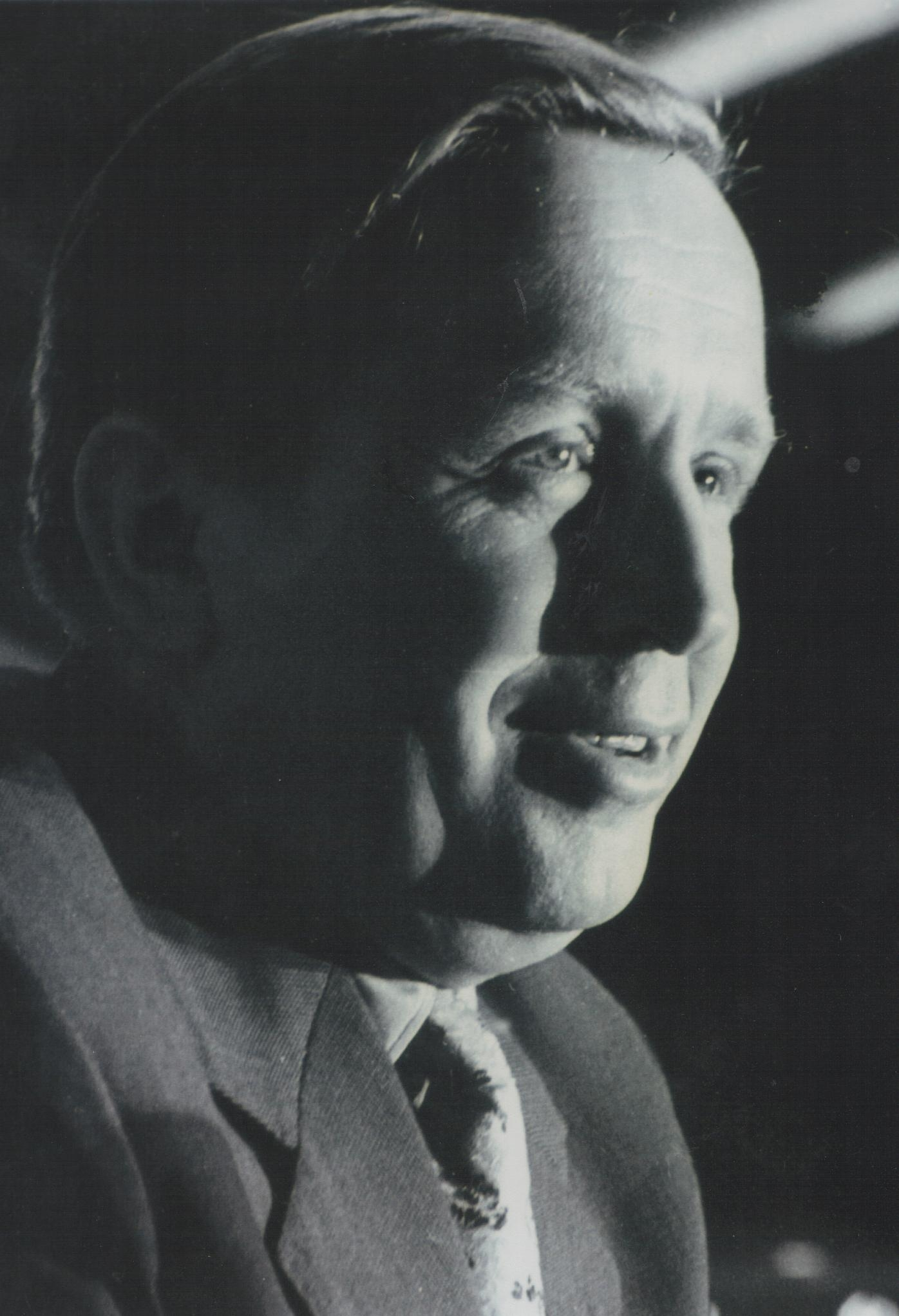
Branko Ćopić

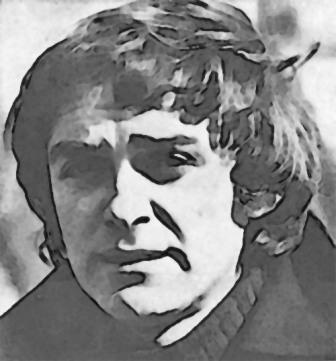
Momo Kapor

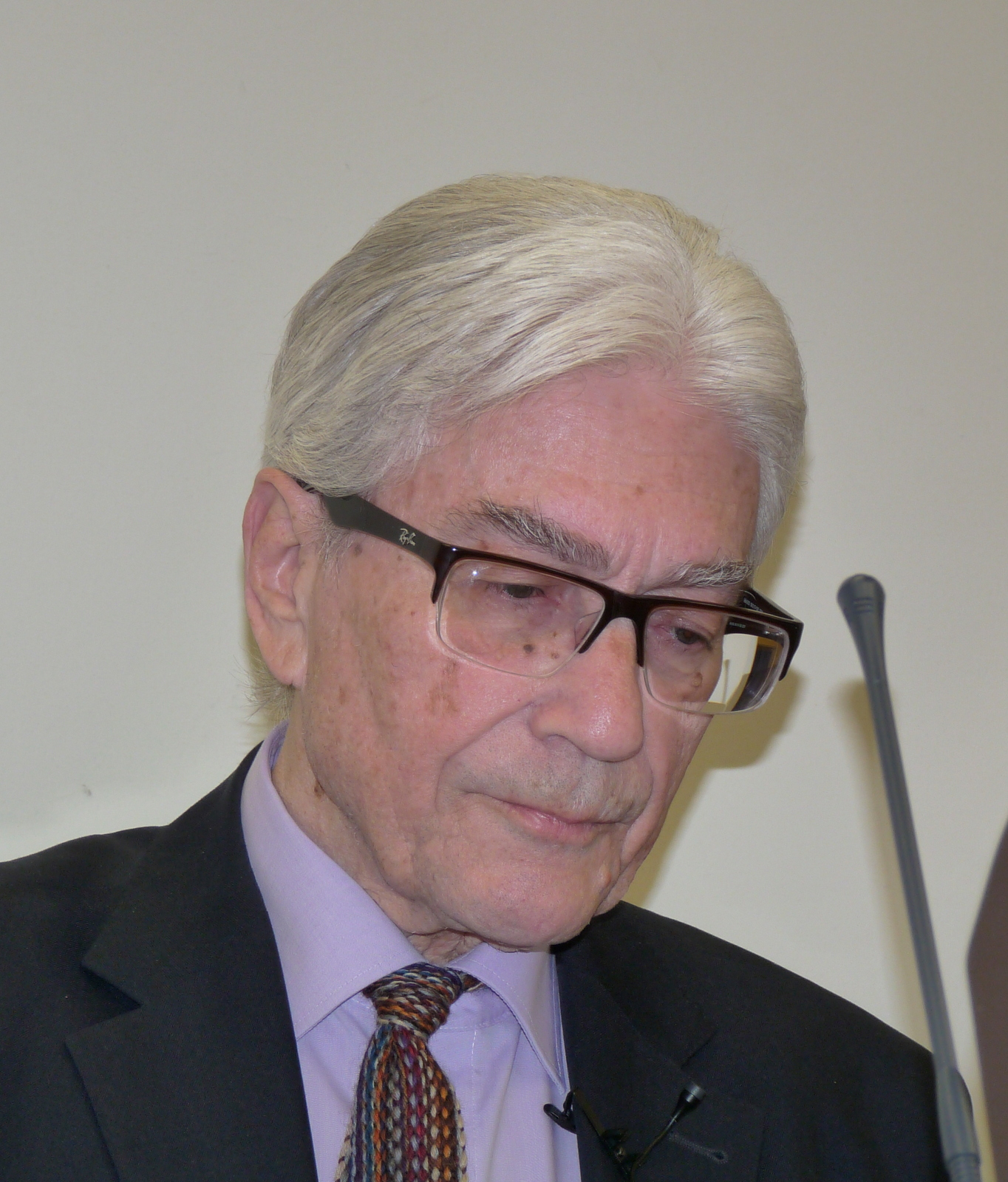
Ranko Bugarski

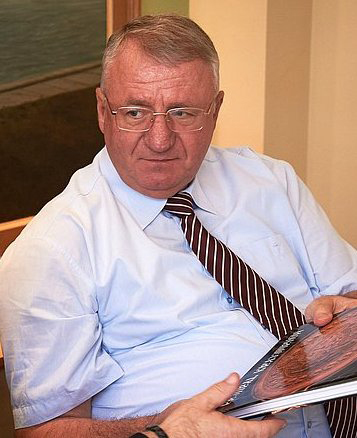
Vojislav Šešelj

Milorad Dodik

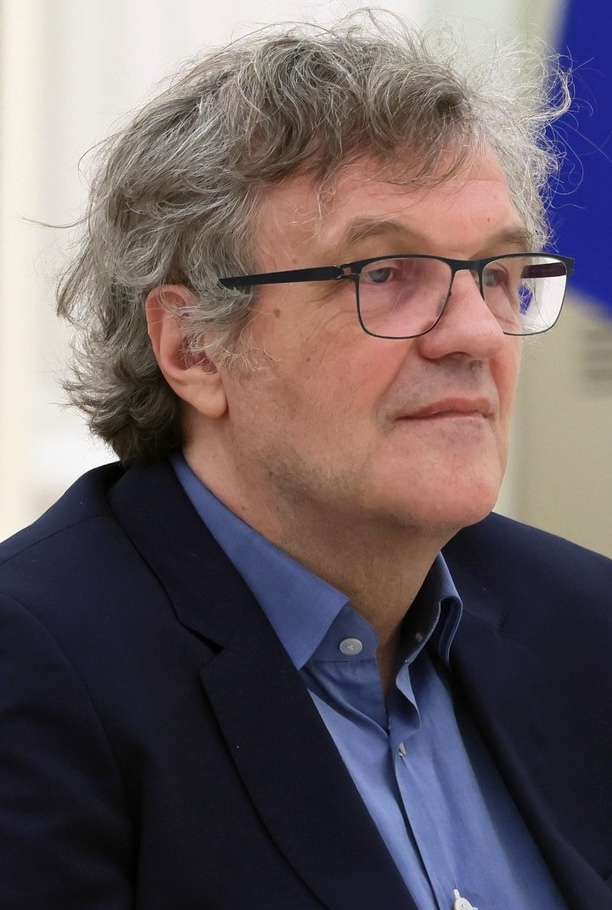
Emir Kusturica

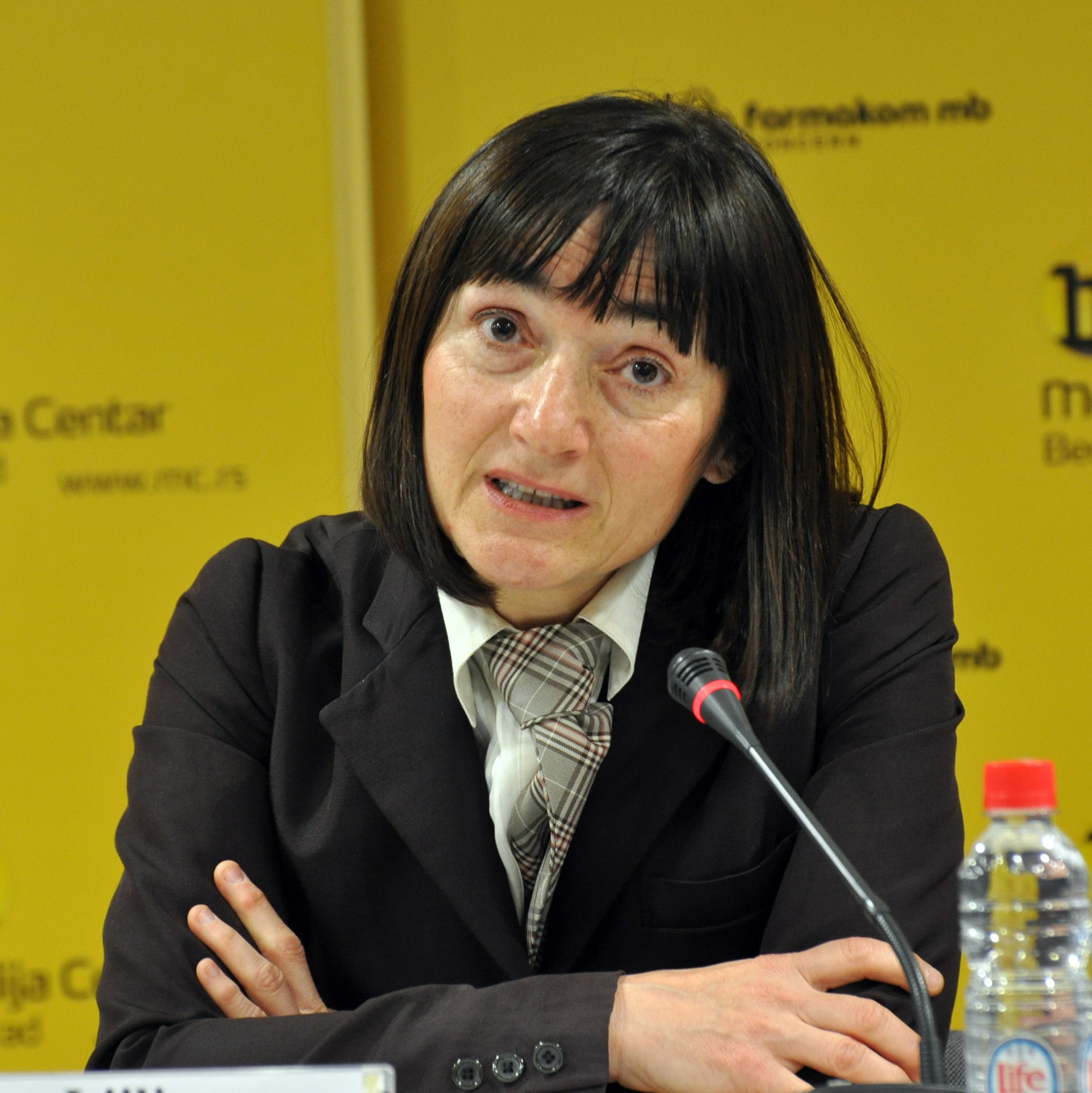
Ljiljana Smajlović

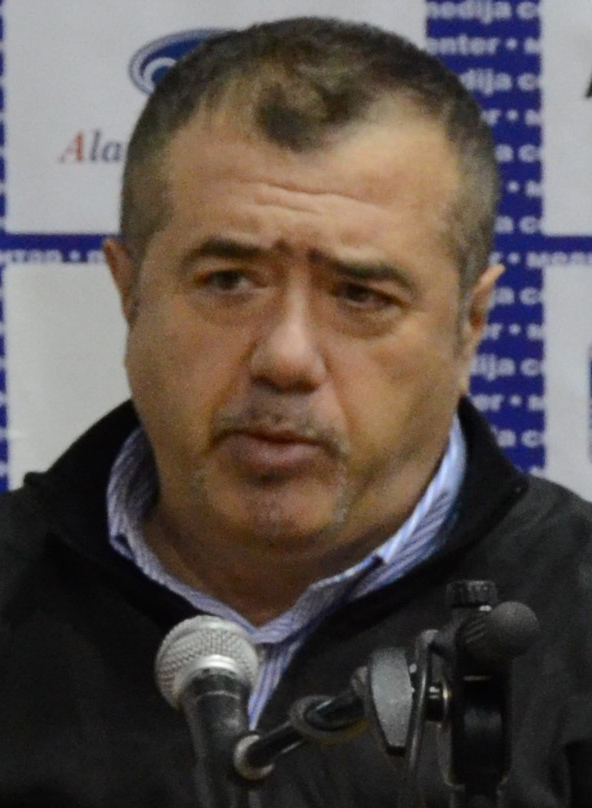
Vladimir Pištalo

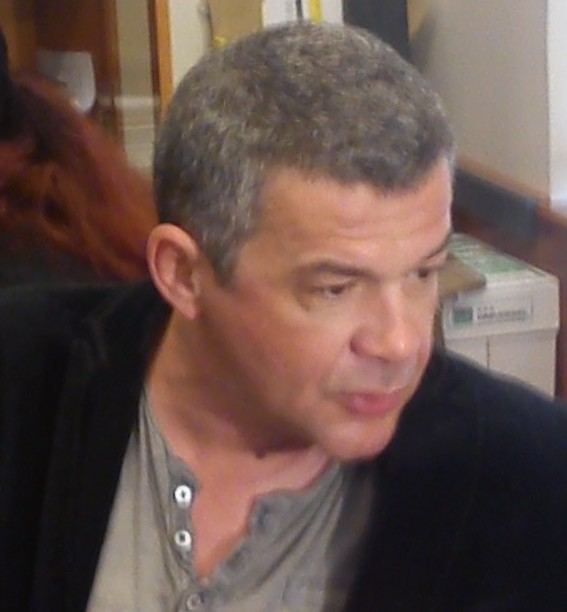
Nebojša Glogovac

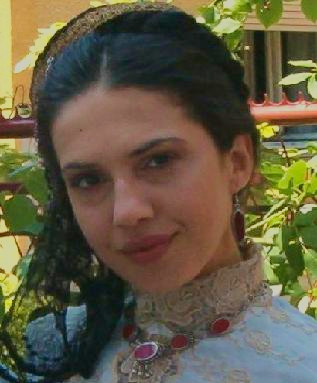
Nataša Ninković

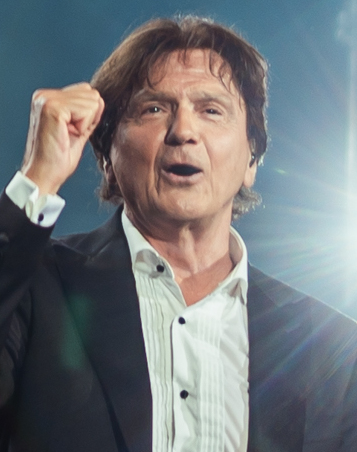
Zdravko Čolić

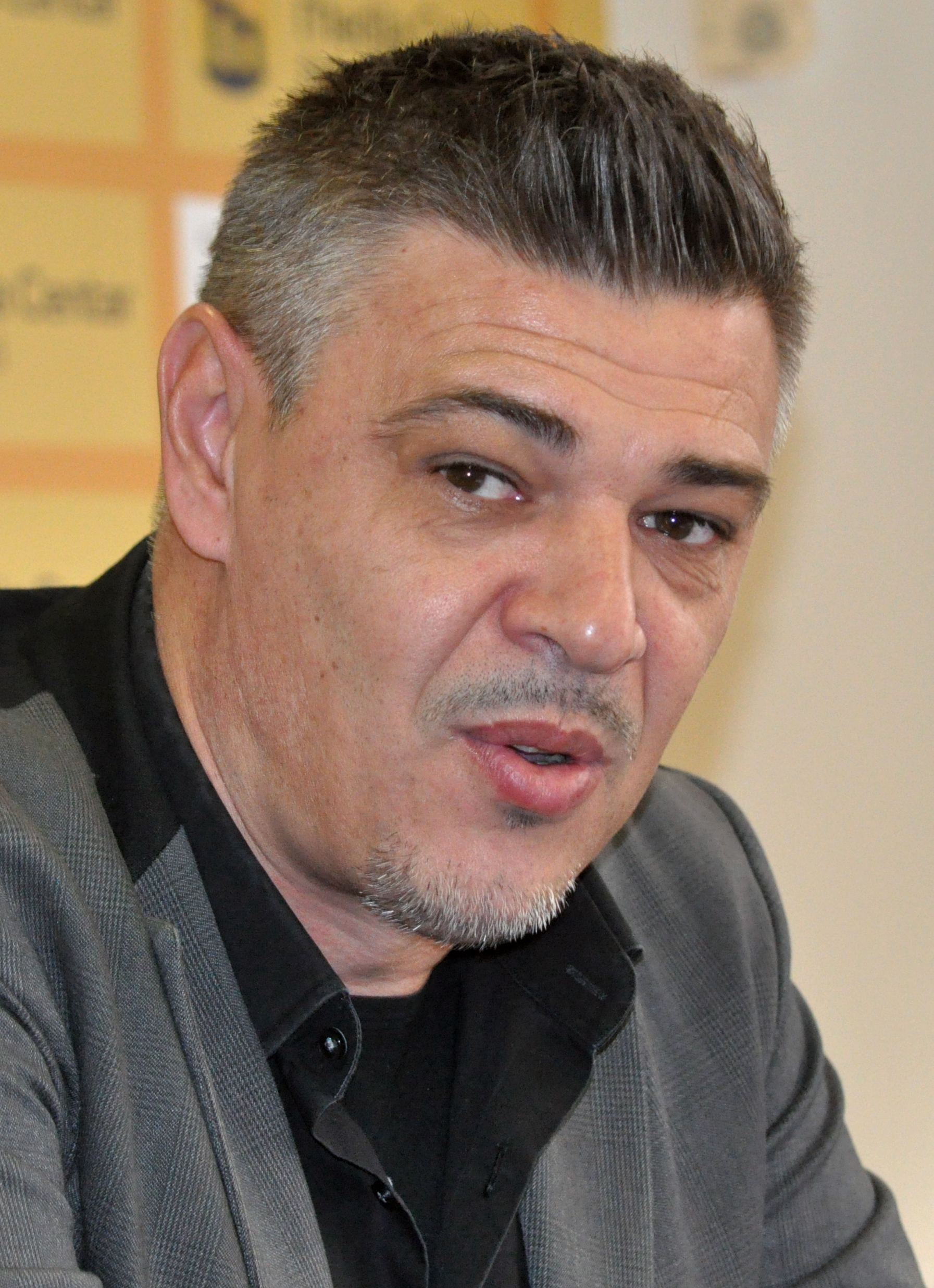
Savo Milošević

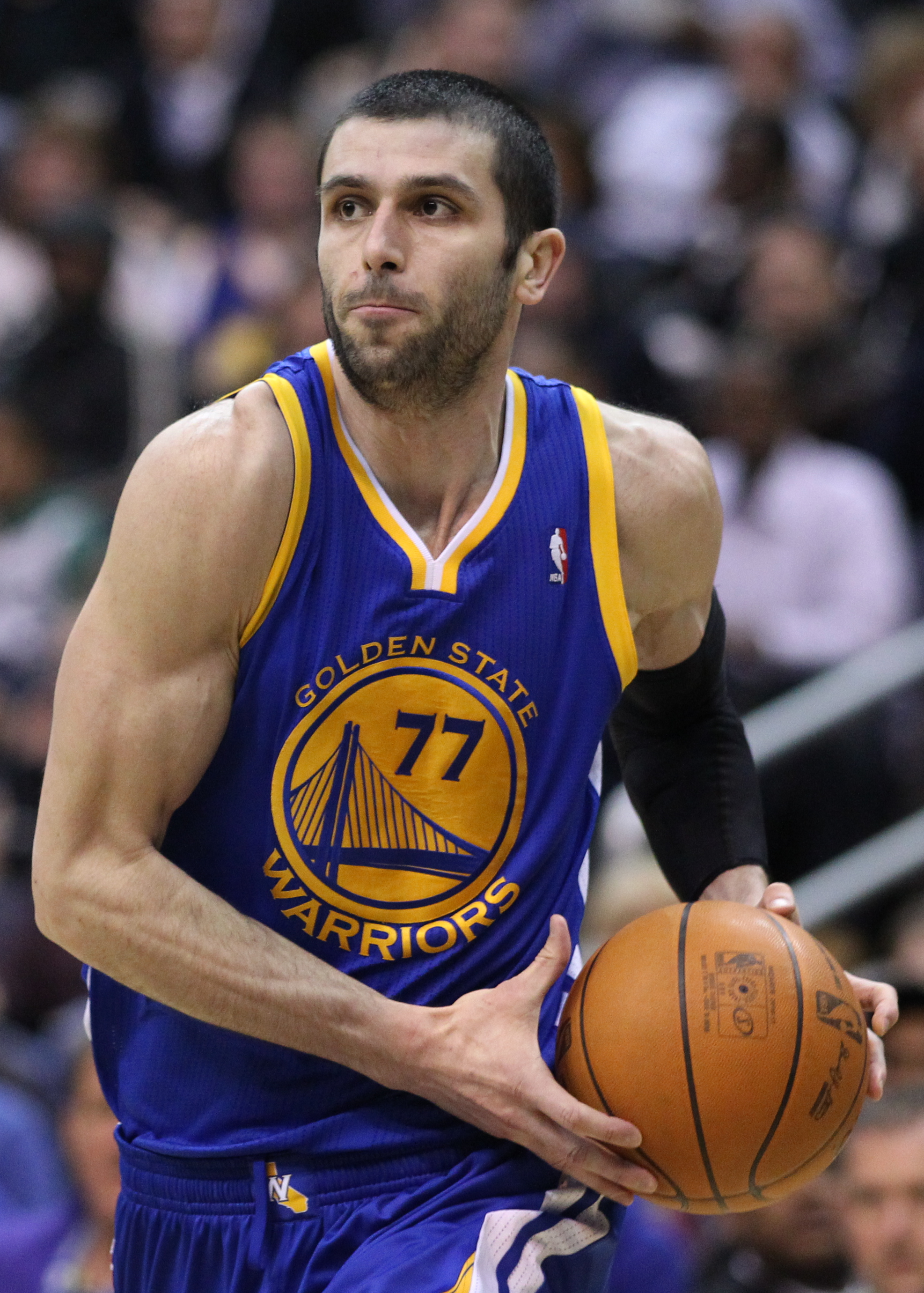
Vladimir Radmanović

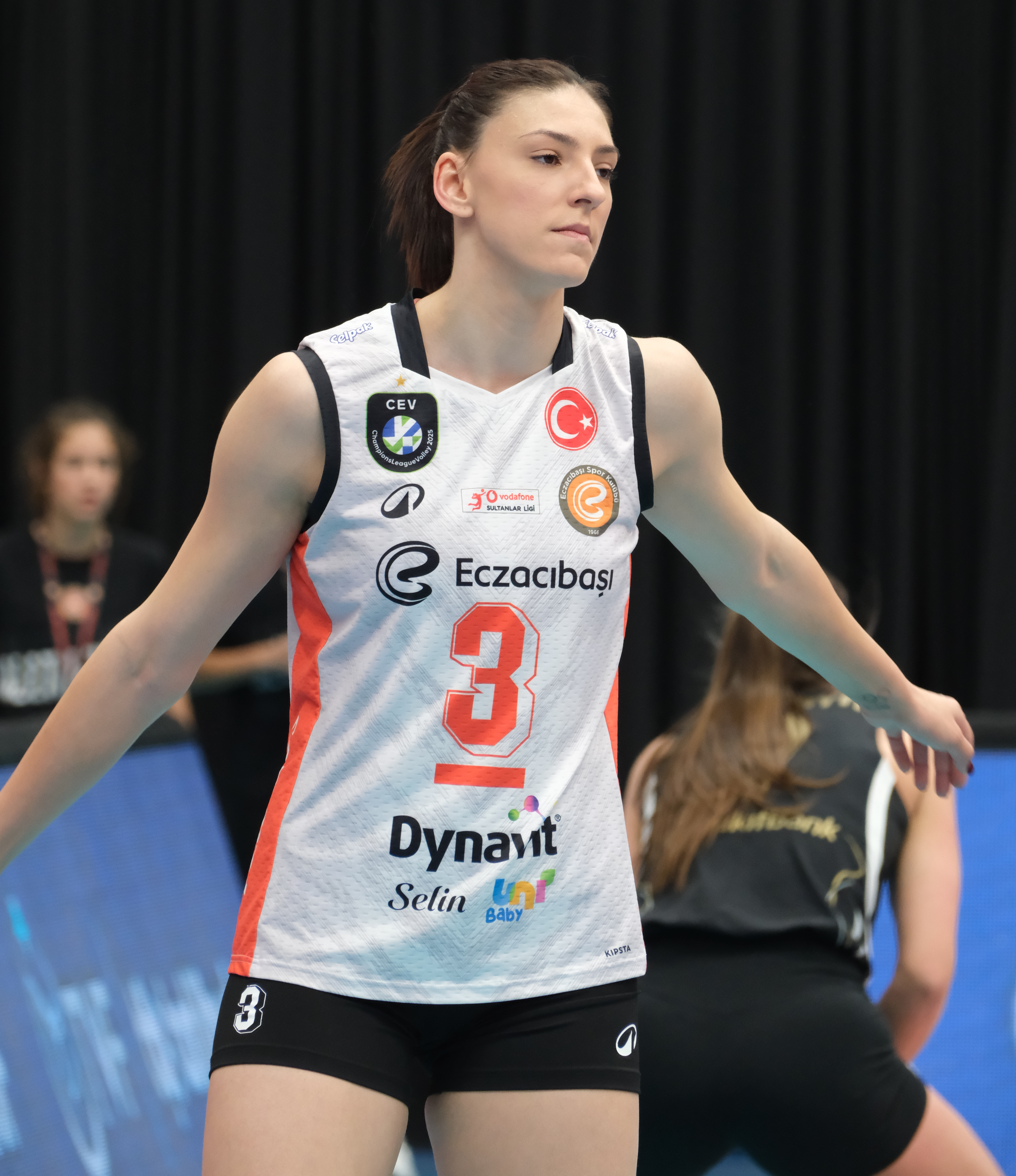
Tijana Bošković

- Dušan Bajević – football player and coach
- Tijana Bošković – volleyball player
- Milan Budimir – linguist
- Ranko Bugarski – linguist
- Basil of Ostrog – venerated Orthodox saint
- Rodoljub Čolaković – politician
- Zdravko Čolić – singer
- Vaso Čubrilović – historian
- Branko Ćopić – writer
- Vladimir Ćorović – historian
- Predrag Danilović – basketball player
- Milorad Dodik – politician
- Ratomir Dugonjić – politician
- Milorad Ekmečić – historian
- Milan Galić – football player
- Nebojša Glogovac – actor
- Slobodan Kačar – boxer
- Tadija Kačar – boxer
- Momo Kapor – painter and novelist
- Nele Karajlić – actor and musician
- Svetlana Kitić – handball player
- Baja Mali Knindža – singer
- Petar Kočić – writer
- Emir Kusturica – director
- Luka Jović – football player
- Mićo Ljubibratić – rebel leader
- Jovan Marinović – politician
- Veselin Masleša – writer
- Saša Matić – singer
- Cvijetin Mijatović – politician
- Savo Milošević – football player
- Dimitrije Mitrinović – philosopher
- Nataša Ninković – actress
- Sokollu Mehmed Pasha – Ottoman Grand Vizier
- Vladimir Pištalo – writer
- Biljana Plavšić – politician
- Gavrilo Princip – assassin
- Ljubomir Popović – painter
- Vladimir Radmanović – basketball player
- Ratko Radovanović – basketball player
- Marinko Rokvić – singer
- Radovan Samardžić – historian
- Željko Samardžić – singer
- Sima Milutinović Sarajlija – poet
- Zoran Savić – basketball player
- Ljiljana Smajlović – journalist
- Makarije Sokolović – Serbian Patriarch
- Tihomir Stanić – actor
- Branko Stanković – football player and coach
- Boro Stjepanović – actor
- Sreten Stojanović – sculptor
- Neven Subotić – football player
- Aleksa Šantić – poet
- Dušan Šestić – composer
- Vojislav Šešelj, politician
- Zdravko Šotra – director and screenwriter
- Todor Švrakić – painter
- Mladen Vojičić Tifa – singer
- Luka Ćelović Trebinjac – philanthropist
- Duško Trifunović – poet and writer
- Filip Višnjić – epic poet
- Sava Vladislavich – diplomat
- Bogdan Zimonjić – rebel leader
- Pero Zubac – poet and writer

== See also ==
- Serbs of Sarajevo
- Serbs of Mostar
- Bosnia and Herzegovina–Serbia relations

== Bibliography ==
Books

- Bataković, Dušan T. (1996). The Serbs of Bosnia & Herzegovina: History and Politics. Dialogue. ISBN 978-2-91152-710-4. Archived from the original on 27 March 2023.
- Carmichael, Cathie (2015). A Concise History of Bosnia (Illustrated ed.). Cambridge University Press. ISBN 978-1-10701-615-6.
- Ćirković, Sima (2004). The Serbs. Malden: Blackwell Publishing. ISBN 9781405142915.
- Čuvalo, Ante (2010). The A to Z of Bosnia and Herzegovina. Rowman & Littlefield. ISBN 978-0-81087-647-7.
- Donia, Robert J.; Fine, John Jr. (1994). Bosnia and Hercegovina: A Tradition Betrayed. Columbia University Press. ISBN 978-0-23110-161-5. Archived from the original on 27 March 2023.
- Ethnicity/National Affiliation, Religion and Mother Tongue (PDF). Sarajevo: Agency for Statistics of Bosnia and Herzegovina. 2019. Archived (PDF) from the original on 25 July 2020.
- Fine, John Van Antwerp Jr. (1991) [1983]. The Early Medieval Balkans: A Critical Survey from the Sixth to the Late Twelfth Century. University of Michigan Press. ISBN 978-0-47208-149-3. Archived from the original on 15 January 2023.
- Friedman, Francine (2013). Bosnia and Herzegovina: A Polity on the Brink. Routledge. ISBN 978-1-13452-754-0. Archived from the original on 27 March 2023.
- Keil, Soeren (2016). Multinational Federalism in Bosnia and Herzegovina. Routledge. ISBN 978-1-31709-343-5. Archived from the original on 16 September 2021.
- Andjelic, Neven (2004). Bosnia-Herzegovina: The End of a Legacy. Routledge. ISBN 978-1-13575-714-4. Archived from the original on 16 September 2021.
- Sugar, Peter F. (1959). Industrialization of Bosnia-Hercegovina, 1878-1918. University of Washington Press.
- Malcolm, Noel (1996). Bosnia: A Short History. New York University Press. ISBN 978-0-81475-561-7. Archived from the original on 27 March 2023.
- Nikolic-Ristanovic, Vesna (2000). Women, Violence and War: Wartime Victimization of Refugees in the Balkans. Central European University Press. ISBN 978-9-63911-660-3. Archived from the original on 27 March 2023.
- Vlasto, A.P. (1970). The Entry of the Slavs Into Christendom: An Introduction to the Medieval History of the Slavs. Columbia University Press. ISBN 978-0-52107-459-9. Archived from the original on 20 January 2023.
- Velikonja, Mittja (2003). Religious Separation and Political Intolerance in Bosnia-Herzegovina. Texas A&M University Press. ISBN 978-1-60344-724-9. Archived from the original on 27 March 2023.
- Živković, Tibor; Crnčević, Dejan; Bulić, Dejan; Petrović, Vladeta; Cvijanović, Irena; Radovanović, Bojana (2013). The World of the Slavs : Studies of the East, West and South Slavs: Civitas, Oppidas, Villas and Archeological Evidence (7th to 11th Centuries AD). Istorijski institut. ISBN 978-8-67743-104-4. Archived from the original on 27 March 2023.

Journals

- Filipović, Emir. O. (2019). "The Most Noble and Royal House of Kotromanić. Constructing Dynastic Identity in Medieval Bosnia". Südost-Forschungen. 78 (1): 1–38. doi:10.1515/sofo-2019-780104. S2CID 229164853.
- Isailovović, Neven (2018). "Pomeni srpskog imena u srednjovjekovnim bosanskim ispravama" (PDF). Srpsko pisano nasljeđe i istorija srednjovjekovne Bosne i Huma. Archived (PDF) from the original on 19 May 2021.
- McCormick, Rob (2008). "The United States' Response to Genocide in the Independent State of Croatia, 1941–1945". Genocide Studies and Prevention. 3 (1): 75–98. Archived from the original on 15 April 2021.
