= Medna =

Medna Медна
- Village
- Location within Bosnia and Herzegovina
- Coordinates: 44.379°N 16.924°E
- Country: Bosnia & Herzegovina

Government
  - President of the Local community council: Dragan Pena

Population
  - Total: 226

Medna (Serbian Cyrillic: Медна) is a settlement and local community in the Mrkonjić Grad municipality of Republika Srpska entity in Bosnia and Herzegovina.

Aside from Medna itself, the Medna local community also encompasses the settlement of Okandžije.

== Name ==
There are two theories for the etymology of this settlement. The first is that the Ottomans named it Medina which is of Arabic origin for a Fortified Settlement. Older locals still refer to the place as Medina, the chance of this etymology is highly likely as there was a Castle named Prizrenac in the area before Ottoman arrival. The second theory is that the settlement derives from the Serbo-Croatian word Med (honey).

== Demographics ==
According to the 1991 census, the village had a total of 791 inhabitants. Ethnic groups in the village include:

- Serbs: 786 (99,4%)
- Others: 5 (0,6%)

According to the 2013 census, the village had a total of 226 inhabitants. Ethnic groups in the village include:

- Serbs 226 (100%)
