= Prosvjeta (1902) =

Bosnian Serb cultural and educational society

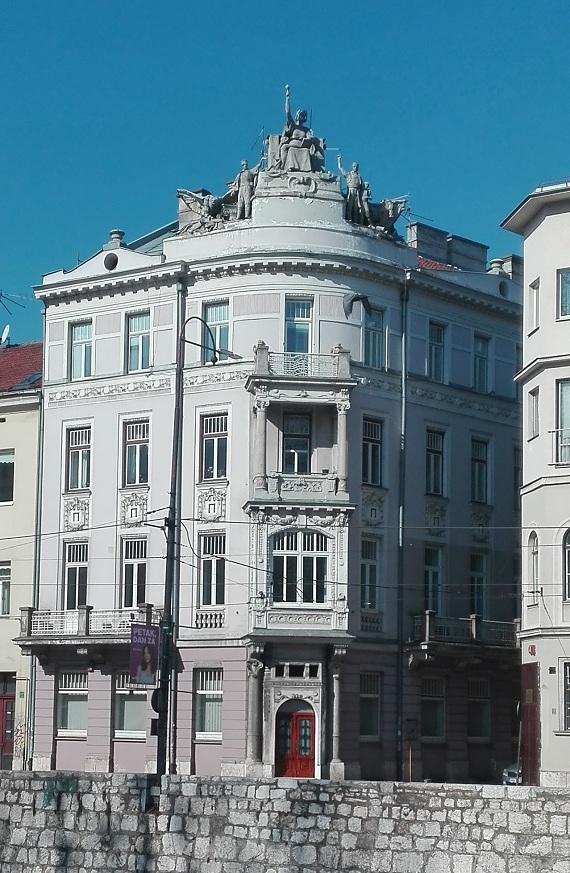
The Prosvjeta building in Sarajevo

Prosvjeta (Serbian Cyrillic: Просвјета; "Enlightenment/Education") or the Serbian Cultural-Educational Society "Prosvjeta" was a Bosnian Serb cultural and educational society in Austro-Hungarian Bosnia and Herzegovina and Yugoslavia. It was founded in Sarajevo in 1902. It quickly became the most important organization gathering ethnic Serb citizens.

In 1909 the first and the only student's house of Prosvjeta was opened in Mostar and Božidar Zečević was its first prefect.

In 1914, the Austro-Hungarian regime had the organization banned and its leadership imprisoned due to "anti-state" actions.

== Notable people ==
- Petar Kočić
- Aleksa Šantić
- Jovan Dučić
- Pero Slijepčević
- Grigorije Petrov
- Jovan Cvijić

== See also ==
- Gajret
- Napredak (1904)

== Sources ==
- Srpsko kulturno i prosvjetno društvo "Prosvjeta": (1902-1949) : sumarno-analitički inventar. Arhiv Bosne i Hercegovine. 2004. ISBN 978-9958-520-03-7.
- Božidar Madžar (2001). Prosvjeta : serb education and culture society 1902-1949. Akademija nauka i umjetnosti Republike Srpske. ISBN 978-86-83255-06-1.
