= Okandžije =

Okandžije Оканџије
- Village
- Location within Bosnia and Herzegovina
- Coordinates: 44.36483104868603°N 16.85972591615452°E
- Country: Bosnia & Herzegovina

Population
  - Total: 48

Okandžije is a settlement in Bosnia and Herzegovina, located in the Mrkonjić Grad municipality of the Republika Srpska entity.

== Name ==
Okandžije derives from a Princess which left the Prizrenac Fortress of rode a horse towards the area of Okandžije where she lost her Kandžija and shouted O, Kandžija!.

== Demographics ==
According to the 1991 census, the village had a total of 143 inhabitants. Ethnic groups in the village include:

- Serbs: 143 (100%)

According to the 2013 census, the village had a total of 48 inhabitants. Ethnic groups in the village include:

- Serbs 48 (100%)
