= Ljubomir Popović =

Serbian and French surrealist painter (1934–2016)

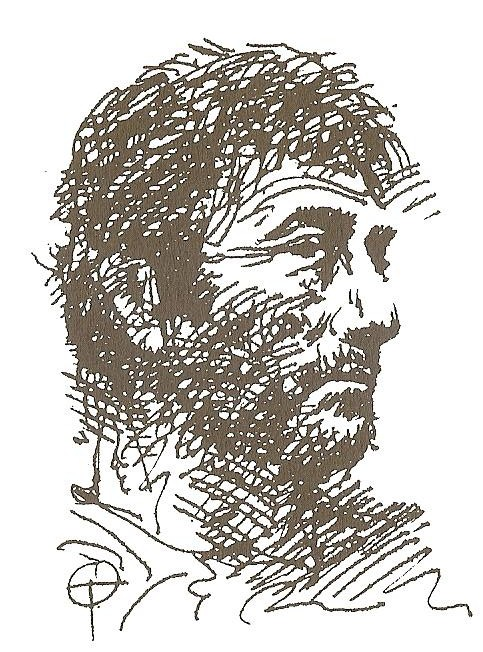
- Drawing of Popović by Zoran Tucić
- Born: 14 October 1934; Tuzla, Kingdom of Yugoslavia (modern-day Bosnia)
- Died: 12 August 2016 (aged 81); Belgrade, Serbia
- Known for: Painter

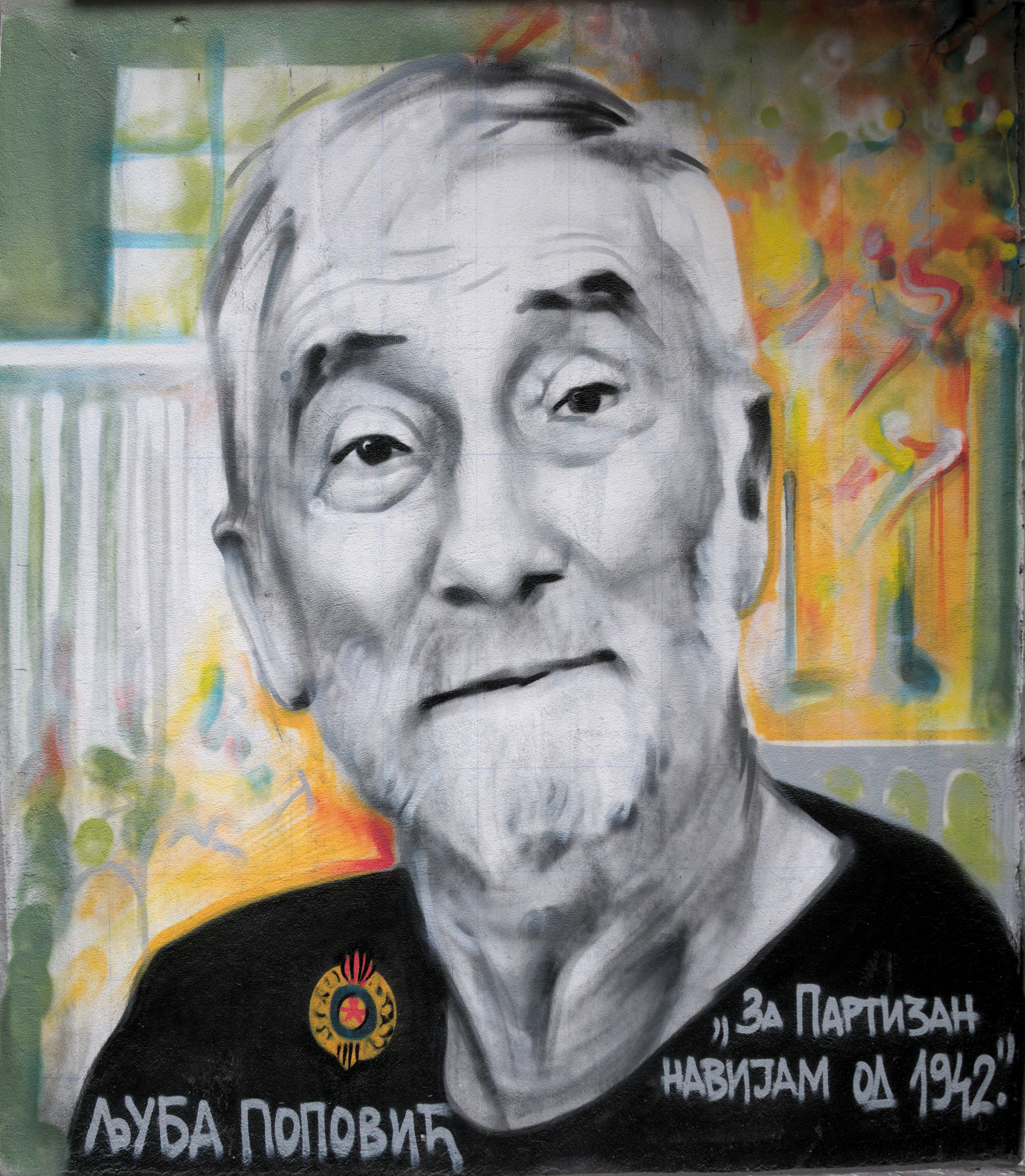
Graffiti in Belgrade, Serbia by FK Partizan fans

Ljubomir "Ljuba" Popović (14 October 1934 – 12 August 2016) was a Serbian surrealist painter. Famous for his numerous erotic and unconventional subjects and active in French painting at the turn of the 1960s and 1970s, he is one of the leading exponents of the era of fantastic surrealism. Capable of combining sensual and iconoclastic themes, his work was widely exhibited at numerous world exhibitions and biennials in the second half of the 20th century.

== Biography ==
Born in Tuzla, Bosnia, Popović studied Fine Arts in Belgrade. During a visit to Paris, he was impressed by the discovery of 1959 exhibition of surrealist art from the Urvater collection. In 1960, he founded the movement "Mediala", to express concepts of desire and fear. Popović arrived in Paris in 1963 and was immediately taken in by French gallerists and surrealists. In his Parisian period in fact Ljuba is very productive, and he came into contact with the vibrant art scene of those years, exhibiting alongside the likes of René Magritte, Wifredo Lam, and many others. Here, supported by the Thessa Herold's gallery, he painted fantastical scenes, full of disturbing and desirable creatures, reminiscent of Dali's work, according to a Mandiargues's review in 1970. Inspired by Renaissance and Baroque painting, as well as his grandfather's exorcisms, Popović's works deal with the demons of a dark pessimism. His subjects, mainly female, are often depicted using mixed media on canvas (alternating between using brushes and applying paint by hand), creating a highly personal painting style.

He is the subject of the short documentary film L'amour monstre de tous les temps (1978) by Walerian Borowczyk.

Popović lived in Paris since 1963, occasionally visiting Serbia. In July 2016, whilst at his summer retreat on the Athos peninsula in Greece, he was taken ill and was transferred to a Belgrade hospital. He died on the night between 11 and 12 August 2016.

== Main works ==
- Les pèlerins d'Emmaüs (1960-1962)
- L'apparition (1967-1968)
- La Tentation de Saint Antoine (1972)
- Le Jugement de l'âme (1984)
- Le Théâtre de la cruauté (1990)
- L'Innocence dévorée (2001)
