= Sunčane Skale 2012 =

International song competition

Dates and venue
- Semi-final: 2 July 2012
- Final: 3 July 2012
- Venue: Kanli Tower, Herceg Novi, Montenegro

Production
- Host broadcaster: Radio Television of Montenegro (RTCG)
- Director: Slobodan Bučevac
- Presenters: Ivan Maksimović, Dajana Pejović Golubović

Participants
- Number of entries: 44 songs from 19 countries
- Debuting countries: Austria; Azerbaijan; Netherlands; Norway; Poland; Tajikistan; Turkey
- Returning countries: Germany; Spain
- Non-returning countries: Denmark; Italy; Russia; Sweden

Vote
- Winning song: J-DA Gel gel

Sunčane Skale 2012 was the eighteenth edition of Sunčane Skale, an annual pop festival held in Montenegro.

== Results ==
=== Nove zvijezde ===
Draw	Singer	Song	Place	Points
01	(Croatia) Marko Vukeš Vuky	Vlasnici srca slomljenih	14	20
02	(Montenegro) Tea Šufta	Magičan dan	15	18
03	(Serbia) Marin Lovrić	Jutarnja vest	17	11
04	(Slovenia) Sandi Kojič	Ona hoče	20	0
05	(Serbia) Joca i zmajevi	Naočari	12	21
06	(Montenegro) Draško Đukić	12 koraka	10	27
07	(Croatia) Matea Sučić	Oprosti što tražim previše	11	25
08	(Serbia) Vladimir Cvetković	Neka govore	13	21
09	(Montenegro) Dragana Rakčević	Odlaziš	2	76
10	(Bosnia and Herzegovina) Aleksandra Bilanović	Somewhere	1	85
11	(North Macedonia) Emil Arsov	Lažem ljude	3	72
12	(Montenegro) Eva Papović	Nisi moj	9	29
13	(Croatia) Andrea Paškvan	Ništa drugo za me ne postoji	16	17
14	(Montenegro) Dragica Bojanić	Ispomoć	19	6
15	(North Macedonia) Zoi Blaz	Sama	7	48
16	(Montenegro) Dušan Mandić Šejn	Daću sve od sebe	18	8
17	(Croatia) Kim Verson	Usijani kamen	8	38
18	(Montenegro) Andrea Vešović	Reskiraj	5	54
19	(Croatia) Tihomir Kožina	Taj osjećaj	6	50
20	(North Macedonia) Denis Murat	Ti si pesnata	4	70

=== Pjesma ljeta ===
The winner of Nove zvijezde should perform first in the final, but actually did not perform.

Draw	Singer	Song	Place	Points
01	(North Macedonia) Aleksandar Belov	Sve je ljepše u dvoje	7	59
02	(Albania) Enrika Derza	Jam e imja	14	32
03	(Austria) Jade Davies	Love crazy girl	9	50
04	(Greece) Elena Iliadi	Agony	19	23
05	(Netherlands) Wim J. Gerrits & (Montenegro) Mićo Vujović	Leave her alone	24	0
06	(North Macedonia) Dani Dimitrovska	Ne pitaj	12	38
07	(Bosnia and Herzegovina) Dino Kulenović	Svirajte još jednu pjesmu	23	7
08	(Poland) Marcin Mrozinski	Is that a real love	3	75
09	(Norway) Rikke Normann	Fading away	18	25
10	(Croatia) Martina Vrbos	Na kraju grada	16	28
11	(Germany) Robert Phoenix	Can you feel how much I love you	17	26
12	(Serbia) Andrej Ilić	Sara	21	17
13	(United States) Glenys Vargas & (United Kingdom) Kevin Ettienne	Love Me/Let Me Go	4	73
14	(Spain) Salome Simone	Fumble in the jungle	22	10
15	(Tajikistan) Tahmina Niyazova	Boom boom boom	6	67
16	(North Macedonia) Vlatko Ilievski	Nema me	20	22
17	(Azerbaijan) Seyran	Sunshine	2	82
18	(Montenegro) Kaja & Dobri Momci	Nek sve bude kao slučajno	15	32
19	(Turkey) J-DA	Gel gel	1	83
20	(Croatia) Magazin	Dušu nemaš da me na njoj nosiš	11	40
21	(Serbia) Dušan Svilar	Kao tebe	5	67
22	(Slovenia) Nuša Derenda	Ja u sebe vjerujem	13	36
23	(Turkey) Deniz Cem	I just need your love	10	44
24	(Montenegro) Ivana Martinović	Slobodna	8	50

== Scoreboard ==
	Results																	
	Points	(Serbia)	(Spain)	(Greece)	(Turkey)	(Poland)	(Slovenia)	(Albania)	(Tajikistan)	(United States)	(Germany)	(Montenegro)	(Austria)	(Azerbaijan)	(Norway)	(Croatia)	(Bosnia and Herzegovina)	(North Macedonia)
Aleksandar Belov	59	7	12	6		5	12						1		8	8		
Enrika Derza	32				2	10						4			12			4
Jade Davies	50	6	5	4	6	4			7	8				10				
Elena Iliadi	23							4	6	10		3						
Wim J. Gerrits & Mićo Vujović	0																	
Dani Dimitrovska	38				4	3	5	2	1	4			10		3	2	4	
Dino Kulenović	7		1		3		3											
Marcin Mrozinski	75	3	8		7		4	8	4	5	10		4	6	5		6	5
Rikke Normann	25					2	6	1	3	3	2		3			3	2	
Martina Vrbos	28		2				10	3			5	1					1	6
Robert Phoenix	26			5		7	1		5					8				
Andrej Ilić	17									2					4	4	7	
Glenys Vargas & Kevin Ettiene	73	4	4	10	5		7	12				7	8	5	10			1
Salome Simone	10			1										3		6		
Tahmina Niyazova	67		10	3	10			10		12	1	2	7	4		5		3
Vlatko Ilievski	22			8				5	2			5	2					
Seyran	82	12	7	2	12	1				7	8	12	6				3	12
Kaja i dobri momci	32						2	7	10		6						5	2
J-DA	83	8	6			8		6	8	6	3	6	12	12				8
Magazin	40	10			1							8		2			12	7
Dušan Svilar	67					12			12			10			1	12	10	10
Nuša Derenda	36	2								1	7		5	1	2	10	8	
Deniz Cem	44	1	3	7		6					12			7	7	1		
Ivana Martinović	50	5		12	8		8				4				6	7		
