= Sunčane Skale 2011 =

Dates and venue
- Semi-final: 4 July 2011
- Final: 5 July 2011
- Venue: Kanli Tower, Herceg Novi, Montenegro

Production
- Host broadcaster: Radio Television of Montenegro (RTCG)
- Director: Slobodan Bučevac
- Presenters: Ivan Maksimović; Nina Mudrinić

Participants
- Number of entries: 47 songs from 14 countries
- Debuting countries: Greece; United Kingdom; United States
- Returning countries: Albania; Denmark; Italy; Russia; Sweden
- Non-returning countries: Bulgaria; France; India; Ukraine

Vote
- Winning song: Qpid Under the radar

Sunčane Skale 2011 was the seventeenth edition of Sunčane Skale, an annual pop festival held in Montenegro.

== Results ==
=== Nove zvijezde ===
Draw	Singer	Song	Place	Points
01	(North Macedonia) Offside	Sekoj den	8	35
02	(Serbia) Damir Čičić	Boje ljubavi	6	46
03	(Serbia) Tijana Kadović	Ja imam samo tebe	7	40
04	(North Macedonia) Goran Kargov	Kad prođeš kroz moje pesme	12	21
05	(Slovenia) Yulia Shmidt	Willing to try	10	27
06	(North Macedonia) Daniel Dann	Se što mi treba	2	81
07	(Serbia) Sanja Nikolić	Sve što ti treba	20	6
08	(Serbia) Milena Bakić	Kradem te	4	56
09	(North Macedonia) Martin Srbinovski	Ram tam tam	9	33
10	(Montenegro) Eva Papović	Poslednju riječ mi šapni	21	6
11	(North Macedonia) Dimitar Andonovski	Ovo nebo znae se	5	52
12	(Montenegro) Aleksandar Zoranić	Iznad vode leptira	22	3
13	(Bosnia and Herzegovina) Darija Kašanski	Moje sve	15	12
14	(Slovenia) Nino	S tabo je lepo	23	1
15	(Croatia) Ivana Tomić	U vodu	11	23
16	(Croatia) Tihomir Kožina	Vatra i led	16	12
17	(Montenegro) Dragana Rakčević	Zbog godina mojih	13	21
18	(Croatia) Barbara Dautović	Previše želja	17	12
19	(Albania) Elhaida Dani	Si asnjehere	1	117
20	(Croatia) Frano Pehar	Između neba i zemlje	14	14
21	(Montenegro) Monika Knezović	Tvoja oduvijek	3	57
22	(Serbia) Sonja Kocić	Znam da odlaziš	18	11
23	(Montenegro) Lazar Lazarević	Zalutao	19	10

=== Pjesma ljeta ===
Draw	Singer	Song	Place	Points
01	(Albania) Elhaida Dani	Si asnjehere	10	35
02	(North Macedonia) Vlatko Ilievski	Moja tamna rijeko	11	31
03	(Denmark) Shila Mariposa	Gambler	17	13
04	(Bosnia and Herzegovina) Igor Vukojević	Više nemam ništa s tim	19	12
05	(Croatia) Maja Šuput	Lijek	16	14
06	(Serbia) Andrej Ilić	Letnji hit	8	39
07	(Albania) Rovena Dilo	Rrefimi	20	8
08	(Russia) DuoLAV	Here i go again	24	0
09	(North Macedonia) Aleksandar Belov	Daleko	9	37
10	(Greece) Elena Iliadi	Like an angel	22	5
11	(Croatia) Ivana Kovač	Nisi ni prvi a ni zadnji	21	7
12	(Montenegro) Slaven Knezović	Zavedi me	7	43
13	(Croatia) Neno Belan	Nedir nad morem plavim	23	5
14	(Serbia) The Breeze	Still keep my love for you	12	31
15	(Sweden) Qpid	Under the radar	1	68
16	(Montenegro) Bojan Delić	Ti možeš sve	3	51
17	(Italy) Tino Favazza	Terra mater	14	26
18	(United States) Glenys Vargas & (United Kingdom) Kevin Ettienne	Power:Positive	15	26
19	(North Macedonia) Joce Panov	Tebi nije stalo	13	27
20	(Bosnia and Herzegovina) Mladen Vojičić Tifa	Ne vjeruj nikom	2	66
21	(Slovenia) Rebeka Dremelj	Odavno te ne volim	5	47
22	(Serbia) Betty Boop & (Serbia) Sajko	Niko kao ti	4	49
23	(Croatia) Ivana Banfić	Zovi me Erika	6	45
24	(Albania) Eranda Libohova	Rroft dasahuria	18	13

== Scoreboard ==
	Results												
	Points	01	02	03	04	05	06	07	08	09	10	11	12
Offside	35	6		8	8					4	3	4	2
Damir Čičić	33		1	5	5	6			6	2		2	6
Tijana Kadović	40	1		4	10			5	10		2		8
Goran Kargov	21								3			6	12
Yulia Shmidt	27	7	4					6		6			4
Daniel Dann	81		6			12	6	8	8	10	12	12	7
Sanja Nikolić	6				4			2					
Milena Bakić	56	10	7	2	3	4	4	10		7	6		3
Martin Srbinovski	46	5		3	7	5			7	3	8	8	
Eva Papović	6		5	1									
Dimitar Andonovski	52	2	3	7	6	7	8			8	1	10	
Aleksandar Zoranić	3					3							
Darija Kašanski	12						5	7					
Nino	1				1								
Ivana Tomić	23					8	10				5		
Tihomir Kožina	12								1		4	7	
Dragana Rakčević	21	4	8	6		2	1						
Barbara Dautović	12						7			5			
Elhaida Dani	117	12	10	10	12	10	12	12	12	12		5	10
Frano Pehar	14							4			7	3	
Monika Knezović	57	8	12	12	2	1	2		4		10	1	5
Sonja Kocić	11	3					3	3	2				
Lazar Lazarević	10		2					1	5	1			1
