= Sunčane Skale 2014 =

International song competition

Dates
- Final: 2 July 2014

Host
- Venue: Kanli Tower, Herceg Novi, Montenegro
- Presenter(s): Ivan Maksimović, Tijana Mišković
- Director: Slobodan Bučevac
- Host broadcaster: Radio Television of Montenegro (RTCG)

Participants
- Number of entries: 26 songs from 5 countries
- Debuting countries: None
- Returning countries: None
- Non-returning countries: Azerbaijan; Germany; Russia; Slovenia; United Kingdom; United States

Vote
- Voting system: Several jury members voted for their 10 favourite song awarding 1-8, 10 and 12 points.
- Winning song: Dimitar Andonovski Ako me boli

Sunčane Skale 2014 was the twentieth edition of Sunčane Skale, an annual pop festival held in Montenegro.

== Results ==
=== Nove zvijezde ===
Draw	Singer	Song	Place	Points
01	Dejan Ćosić	Uzalud su sni	24	4
02	Iva Mirotić	Prva ljubav	25	2
03	Marko Radeta	Nije do mene	22	10
04	Dragica Bojanić	Još uvijek volim te	14	27
05	Aleksandar Tarabunov	Glumila je anđela	9	38
06	Jovana Živković	Luda	19	15
07	Petar Bošković	Reči	12	31
08	Jovana Grozdanović	Sanjam te	26	1
09	Vlada Grujić	Nikad ne reci nikad	6	50
10	Viktorija	Srce moje	18	16
11	Jovan Vuković	Još sam slab	23	5
12	Petra Kovačević	Neka uče od nas	15	24
13	Marko Popović	Haljina	20	11
14	Dejan Milutinović	Samo ti i ja	8	41
15	Aleksandra Dabić	Godinama	13	29
16	Egi	Daj mi da sonam	2	73
17	Dimitar Andonovski	Ako me boli	1	93
18	Elda Kurtagić	Anđele moj	5	53
19	Blah Blah Bend & Sanja Dimitrijević	Neosvojivi	3	63
20	Nina Ubović	Pokaži mi da znaš	17	19
21	Ilija Gojović	Zaleđen	21	11
22	Mila Nikić	Odlazim	7	45
23	Katarina Bogićević	Bez riječi	11	35
24	Pirati	200%	4	59
25	Milan Bukilić	Tren	16	20
26	Monika Knezović	Lavica	10	37

=== 20 years of the festival ===
One day after Nove zvijezde (on 3 July 2014) it was held an interval event as a celebration of 20 years of the festival, where the biggest pop stars (who participated in the festival) performed.

Draw	Singer	Song
01	Dimitar Andonovski	Ako me boli
02	Joce Panov	Samo ne ćuti
03	Milena Vučić	Samo moj
04	Boris Režak	Ti si moja
05	Rebeka Dremelj	Sto sitnica
06	Miki Perić	Zlato moje
07	Zana	Mala
08	Knez	Dona
09	Romana	Nikad i zauvijek
10	Amadeus Band	Moja zemlja
11	Goca Tržan	Gluve usne
12	Željko Vasić	Voli me i ne voli me
13	Emi Bogdo	Jeta Shpirtin ta rremben
14	Aleksandar Belov	Reci da me ne voliš
15	Goran Karan	Ljubav čuvaj
16	Ivana Banfić	Imam te
17	Bojan Marović	Neka te ljubi
18	Aleksandra Bučevac	Ničija
19	Boris Novković	Kunem ti se
20	Jelena Tomašević	Radio svira za nas
21	Sergej Ćetković	Moj svijet
22	Colonia	Laž za laž
23	Željko Joksimović	Ludak kao ja
24	Marija Šerifović	Mrš
25	Vlado Georgiev	Reci ne ili da

== Scoreboard ==
	Results														
	Points	(North Macedonia)	(Croatia)	(Bosnia and Herzegovina)	(Bosnia and Herzegovina)	(Montenegro)	(Montenegro)	(Montenegro)	(Serbia)	(Montenegro)	(Slovenia)	(North Macedonia)	(Croatia)	(Bosnia and Herzegovina)	(Serbia)
Dejan Ćosić	4														4
Iva Mirotić	2							1		1					
Marko Radeta	10						8	2							
Dragica Bojanić	27	1			8	6				3	3	3			3
Aleksandar Tarabunov	38	6	1			1	5	10			7	8			
Jovana Živković	15			1				3	3		4	4			
Petar Bošković	31				1		3		10	2	8			7	
Jovana Grozdanović	1										1				
Vlada Grujić	50			12		12	12		6	5				3	
Viktorija	16				6						6		4		
Jovan Vuković	5														5
Petra Kovačević	24		8	4							2		10		
Marko Popović	11	3		8											
Dejan Milutinović	41	5	3		12			5	12				2	2	
Aleksandra Dabić	29			7		8			8			6			
Egi	73	12	10		10		6		2			10	5	10	8
Dimitar Andonovski	93	7	12	5	7		10			10		12	8	12	10
Elda Kurtagić	53	2	2		5	2	4	8		4	5		1	8	12
Blah Blah Bend & Sanja Dimitrijević	63	8	5	6		10	2		5	12		7	7	1	
Nina Ubović	19		7										12		
Ilija Gojović	11					5									6
Mila Nikić	45		6	3	3		1	12	1	8			6	5	
Katarina Bogićević	35				4	3		7		6	12	2			1
Pirati	59	10	4	10		4	7		7		10	1		6	
Milan Bukilić	20				2	7		6					3		2
Monika Knezović	37	4		2				4	4	7		5		4	7
