= X Factor (Albanian TV series) season 4 =

X Factor
- Season 4
- Hosted by: Alketa Vejsiu
- Judges: Alban Skënderaj; Miriam Cani; Bleona Qereti; Pandi Laço
- Winner: Edea Demaliaj
- Runner-up: Genti Deda

Release
- Original release: 5 January – 1 June 2015

Season chronology
- ← Previous; Season 3 Next → Season 5

X Factor is an Albanian television music competition to find new singing talents. The fourth season began on 5 January on TV Klan.

The auditions were broadcast in January, when the show started airing. The show was hosted once again by Albanian singer Alketa Vejsiu, while the judging panel this year consisted of Bleona Qereti, Alban Skenderaj, Miriam Cani and Pandi Laço.

The other differences this year, was that there was a variety of contestants who come from different places. Manuel Moscati, Ylenia Iorio and Matteo Brento were from Italy. There was a soloist from Macedonia, Alice, this year. There was a soloist from Kosovo, Floriana Rexhepi, this year too.

== Judges' houses ==
The 14 eliminated acts were:

- Boys: Algert Sala, Arnold Kallaci, Drilon Jahdauti, Fisnik Fetahu
- Girls: Aiola Laska, Ensuida Gjergji, Oresta Dibra, Xhulia Ziri
- Over 23s: Ana Ndini, Erlisa Shena, Leotrim Gervalla, Megi Karavani
- Groups: Duo, No Name

== Contestants ==
The top 16 Contestants were confirmed as follows;

Key:

– Winner
– Runner-up

Category (mentor)	Acts				
Boys (Qereti)	Dilan Reka	Genti Deda	Gerald Celibashi	Igli Zarka	Matteo Brento
Girls (Cani)	Edea Demaliaj	Floriana Rexhepi	Lediana Matoshi	Mirela Boka	
Over 23s (Skënderaj)	Adela Curra	Alice	Manuel Moscati	Ylenia Iorio	
Groups (Laço)	Brunetts	Double F	Mama Pop	X Roads	

== Live Shows ==
=== Results summary ===
Color key

–	Contestant was in the bottom two/three and had to sing again in the final showdown
–	Contestant was in the bottom three but received the fewest votes and was immediately eliminated
–	Contestant received the most public votes

Weekly results per contestant
Contestant	Week 1	Week 2	Week 3	Week 4	Week 5	Week 6	Week 7	Week 8	Week 9	Week 10	Week 11	Week 12	Week 13	Week 14	Week 15
Edea Demaliaj	Safe	Safe	Safe	Safe	Safe	Safe	Safe	Safe	Safe	Safe	Safe	Safe	Bottom two	1st	Winner (week 15)
Genti Deda	Bottom four	Safe	Safe	Safe	Safe	Safe	Safe	Safe	Safe	Safe	Safe	Safe	Safe	Bottom two	Runner-up (week 15)
Dilan Reka	Safe	Safe	Safe	Safe	Safe	Safe	Safe	Bottom two	Safe	Safe	Safe	Safe	Safe	Bottom two	Eliminated (week 14)
Manuel Moscati	Safe	Safe	Safe	Safe	Safe	Safe	Bottom two	Safe	Safe	Bottom two	Safe	Bottom two	Bottom two	Eliminated (week 13)	
Floriana Rexhepi	Safe	Bottom two	Safe	Safe	Safe	Safe	Safe	Safe	Safe	Safe	Safe	Bottom two	Eliminated (week 12)		
Matteo Brento	Safe	Safe	Safe	Safe	10th	Safe	Safe	Safe	Bottom two	Bottom two	Eliminated (week 10)				
Brunetts	Safe	Safe	Safe	Safe	Safe	Safe	Safe	Safe	Bottom two	Eliminated (week 9)					
Alice	Safe	Safe	Safe	Bottom two	Safe	Safe	Safe	Bottom two	Eliminated (week 8)						
Lediana Matoshi	Safe	Safe	Bottom two	Safe	Safe	Bottom two	Bottom two	Eliminated (week 7)							
Igli Zarka	Safe	Safe	Safe	Safe	Safe	Bottom two	Eliminated (week 6)								
Mirela Boka	Safe	Safe	Safe	Safe	11th	Eliminated (week 5)									
X Roads	Safe	Safe	Safe	Bottom two	Eliminated (week 4)										
Ylenia Iorio	Safe	Safe	Bottom two	Eliminated (week 3)											
Mama Pop	Safe	Bottom two	Eliminated (week 2)												
Adela Curra	Bottom four	Eliminated (week 1)													
Double F	16-17th	Eliminated (week 1)													
Gerald Celibashi	16-17th	Eliminated (week 1)													
Final showdown	Adela Curra; Genti Deda	Floriana Rexhepi; Mama Pop	Lediana Matoshi; Ylenia Iorio	Alice; X Roads	Matteo Brento; Mirela Boka	Igli Zarka; Lediana Matoshi	Lediana Matoshi; Manuel Moscati	Alice; Dilan Reka	Brunetts; Matteo Brento	Manuel Moscati; Matteo Brento		Floriana Rexhepi; Manuel Moscati	Edea Demaliaj; Manuel Moscati	Dilan Reka; Genti Deda	No final showdown or judges' vote: results are based on public votes alone
Judges voted to eliminate:	Eliminate														No final showdown or judges' vote: results are based on public votes alone
Skënderaj's vote to eliminate:	Genti Deda	Mama Pop	Lediana Matoshi	X Roads	Mirela Boka	Igli Zarka	Lediana Matoshi	Dilan Reka	Brunetts	Matteo Brento	—	Floriana Rexhepi	Edea Demaliaj	Genti Deda	No final showdown or judges' vote: results are based on public votes alone
Cani's vote to eliminate:	Adela Curra	Mama Pop	Ylenia Iorio	X Roads	Matteo Brento	Igli Zarka	Manuel Moscati	Alice	Brunetts	Matteo Brento	—	Manuel Moscati	Manuel Moscati	Dilan Reka	No final showdown or judges' vote: results are based on public votes alone
Qereti's vote to eliminate:	Adela Curra	Mama Pop	Ylenia Iorio	X Roads	Mirela Boka	Lediana Matoshi	Lediana Matoshi	Alice	Brunetts	Manuel Moscati	—	Floriana Rexhepi	Manuel Moscati	None (Refused)	No final showdown or judges' vote: results are based on public votes alone
Laço's vote to eliminate:	Adela Curra	Floriana Rexhepi	Ylenia Iorio	Alice	Matteo Brento	Igli Zarka	Lediana Matoshi	Alice	Matteo Brento	Matteo Brento	—	Floriana Rexhepi	Manuel Moscati	Dilan Reka	No final showdown or judges' vote: results are based on public votes alone
Eliminated	Gerald Celibashi & Double F Public Vote	Mama Pop; 3 of 4 votes Majority	Ylenia Iorio; 3 of 4 votes Majority	X Roads; 3 of 4 votes Majority	Mirela Boka; 2 of 4 votes Deadlock	Igli Zarka; 3 of 4 votes Majority	Lediana Matoshi; 3 of 4 votes Majority	Alice; 3 of 4 votes Majority	Brunetts; 3 of 4 votes Majority	Matteo Brento; 3 of 4 votes Majority	None	Floriana Rexhepi; 3 of 4 votes Majority	Manuel Moscati; 3 of 4 votes Majority	Dilan Reka; 2 of 3 votes Majority	Genti Deda; Runner-Up
Eliminated	Adela Curra; 3 of 4 votes Majority	Mama Pop; 3 of 4 votes Majority	Ylenia Iorio; 3 of 4 votes Majority	X Roads; 3 of 4 votes Majority	Mirela Boka; 2 of 4 votes Deadlock	Igli Zarka; 3 of 4 votes Majority	Lediana Matoshi; 3 of 4 votes Majority	Alice; 3 of 4 votes Majority	Brunetts; 3 of 4 votes Majority	Matteo Brento; 3 of 4 votes Majority	None	Floriana Rexhepi; 3 of 4 votes Majority	Manuel Moscati; 3 of 4 votes Majority	Dilan Reka; 2 of 3 votes Majority	Edea Demaliaj; Winner

=== Live show details ===
==== Week 1 (23 February 2015) ====
Contestants' performances on the first live show
Act	Order	Song	Result
Dilan Reka	1	"It's a Man's Man's Man's World"	Safe
Ylenia Iorio	2	"I Surrender"	Safe
Floriana Rexhepi	3	"I'd Rather Go Blind"	Safe
Mama Pop	4	"Wannabe"	Safe
Lediana Matoshi	5	"Rehab"	Safe
Double F	6	"Nah Neh Nah"	Eliminated
Mirela Boka	7	"This Is My Now"	Safe
Gerald Celibashi	8	"One"	Eliminated
Adela Curra	9	"Sober"	Bottom two
Manuel Moscati	10	"Refuzoj"	Safe
X Roads	11	"Show Me the Meaning of Being Lonely"	Safe
Igli Zarka	12	"Break On Through (To the Other Side)"	Safe
Brunetts	13	"Proud Mary"	Safe
Alice	14	"All of Me"	Safe
Genti Deda	15	"The A Team"	Bottom two
Edea Demaliaj	16	"Angel"	Safe
Matteo Brento	17	"Mos Qaj"	Safe
Final showdown details
Adela Curra	1	"Because of You"	Eliminated
Genti Deda	2	"Impossible"	Safe

Judges' votes to eliminate

- Alban Skënderaj: Genti Deda
- Bleona Qereti: Adela Curra
- Miriam Cani: Adela Curra
- Pandi Laço: Adela Curra

==== Week 2 (2 March 2015) ====
Contestants' performances on the second live show
Act	Order	Song	Result
Ylenia Iorio	1	"Me ty"	Safe
X Roads	2	"Ai Se Eu Te Pego"	Safe
Mirela Boka	3	"One and Only"	Safe
Manuel Moscati	4	"Sognami"	Safe
Mama Pop	5	"Black Widow"	Bottom two
Alice	6	"Son of a Preacher Man"	Safe
Dilan Reka	7	"I Believe I Can Fly"	Safe
Floriana Rexhepi	8	"I Have Nothing"	Bottom two
Lediana Matoshi	9	"All About That Bass"	Safe
Matteo Brento	10	"Un amore cosi Grande"	Safe
Igli Zarka	11	"Dreamer"	Safe
Brunetts	12	"Bound to You"	Safe
Genti Deda	13	"The Climb"	Safe
Edea Demaliaj	14	"Seven Devils"	Safe
Final showdown details
Mama Pop	1	"Fighter"	Eliminated
Floriana Rexhepi	2	"A Moment Like This"	Safe

Judges' votes to eliminate

- Miriam Cani: Mama Pop
- Pandi Laço: Floriana Rexhepi
- Alban Skënderaj: Mama Pop
- Bleona Qereti: Mama Pop

==== Week 3 (9 March 2015) ====
Contestants' performances on the third live show
Act	Order	Song	Result
Floriana Rexhepi	1	"Je suis Malade"	Safe
Manuel Moscati	2	"Feeling Good"	Safe
Edea Demaliaj	3	"At Last"	Safe
X Roads	4	"It's My Life"	Safe
Ylenia Iorio	5	"Di sole e d'azzurro"	Bottom two
Brunetts	6	"You're the One That I Want"	Safe
Lediana Matoshi	7	"Black Horse and the Cherry Tree"	Bottom two
Mirela Boka	8	"Crazy in Love"	Safe
Genti Deda	9	"Las Vegas"	Safe
Matteo Brento	10	"Hold the Line"	Safe
Alice	11	"Breakaway"	Safe
Dilan Reka	12	"Purple Rain"	Safe
Igli Zarka	13	"Be Prepared"	Safe
Final showdown details
Ylenia Iorio	1	"[[]]"	Eliminated
Lediana Matoshi	2	"Billie Jean"	Safe

Judges' votes to eliminate

- Miriam Cani: Ylenia Iorio
- Pandi Laço: Ylenia Iorio
- Alban Skënderaj: Lediana Matoshi
- Bleona Qereti: Ylenia Iorio

==== Week 4 (16 March 2015) ====
Contestants' performances on the fourth live show
Act	Order	Song	Result
Dilan Reka	1	"Listen"	Safe
Edea Demaliaj	2	"Elastic Heart"	Safe
Igli Zarka	3	"Fever"	Safe
Manuel Moscati	4	"One Day / Reckoning Song"	Safe
Mirela Boka	5	"Love Me Harder"	Safe
Genti Deda	6	"Here Without You"	Safe
X Roads	7	"Grenade"	Bottom two
Lediana Matoshi	8	"Raggamuffin"	Safe
Matteo Brento	9	"E penso a te"	Safe
Alice	10	"Burn"	Bottom two
Floriana Rexhepi	11	"Unconditionally"	Safe
Brunetts	12	"It's Oh So Quiet"	Safe
Final showdown details
Alice	1	"Diamonds"	Safe
X Roads	2	"You Raise Me Up"	Eliminated

Judges' votes to eliminate

- Miriam Cani: X Roads
- Pandi Laço: Alice
- Alban Skënderaj: X Roads
- Bleona Qereti: X Roads

==== Week 5 (23 March 2015) ====
Contestants' performances on the fifth live show
Act	Order	Song	Result
Matteo Brento	1	"Arriverá"	Bottom two
Brunetts	2	"All That Jazz"	Safe
Dilan Reka	3	"Who's Lovin' You"	Safe
Alice	4	"Can't Help Falling in Love"	Safe
Igli Zarka	5	"Fly Me to the Moon"	Safe
Manuel Moscati	6	"Ancora"	Safe
Floriana Rexhepi	7	"You Lost Me"	Safe
Mirela Boka	8	"Flashdance... What a Feeling"	Bottom two
Genti Deda	9	"Let It Be"	Safe
Lediana Matoshi	10	"Mercy"	Safe
Edea Demaliaj	11	"Cry Baby"	Safe
Final showdown details
Matteo Brento	1	"Summertime Sadness"	Safe
Mirela Boka	2	"One and Only"	Eliminated

Judges' votes to eliminate

- Miriam Cani: Matteo Brento
- Pandi Laço: Matteo Brento
- Alban Skënderaj: Mirela Boka
- Bleona Qereti: Mirela Boka

==== Week 6 (30 March 2015) ====
Contestants' performances on the sixth live show
Act	Order	Song	Result
Lediana Matoshi	1	"Dear Future Husband"	Bottom two
Dilan Reka	2	"And I Am Telling You I'm Not Going"	Safe
Brunetts	3	"Man! I Feel Like a Woman!"	Safe
Igli Zarka	4	"Belle"	Bottom two
Alice	5	"Unchained Melody"	Safe
Genti Deda	6	"Thinking Out Loud"	Safe
Matteo Brento	7	"L'immensità"	Safe
Edea Demaliaj	8	"Empire"	Safe
Manuel Moscati	9	"Like a Virgin"	Safe
Floriana Rexhepi	10	"I Just Want to Make Love to You"	Safe
Final showdown details
Lediana Matoshi	1	"This World"	Safe
Igli Zarka	2	"Diamonds & Rust"	Eliminated

Judges' votes to eliminate

- Miriam Cani: Igli Zarka
- Bleona Qereti: Lediana Matoshi
- Pandi Laço: Igli Zarka
- Alban Skënderaj: Igli Zarka

==== Week 7 (6 April 2015) ====
Contestants' performances on the seventh live show
Act	Order	Song	Result
Manuel Moscati	1	"Blurred Lines"	Bottom two
Brunetts	2	"Wrecking Ball"	Safe
Lediana Matoshi	3	"The Monster"	Bottom two
Genti Deda	4	"Haven't Met You Yet"	Safe
Matteo Brento	5	"Je Ti"	Safe
Alice	6	"Sweet Dreams"	Safe
Edea Demaliaj	7	"I Put a Spell on You"	Safe
Floriana Rexhepi	8	"Tough Lover"	Safe
Dilan Reka	9	"Lay Me Down"	Safe
Final showdown details
Manuel Moscati	1	"[[]]"	Safe
Lediana Matoshi	2	"Big Girls Cry"	Eliminated

Judges' votes to eliminate

- Miriam Cani: Manuel Moscati
- Pandi Laço: Lediana Matoshi
- Alban Skënderaj: Lediana Matoshi
- Bleona Qereti: Lediana Matoshi

==== Week 8 (13 April 2015) ====
Contestants' performances on the eighth live show
Act	Order	Song	Result
Genti Deda	1	"Lonely No More"	Safe
Dilan Reka	2	"When I Was Your Man"	Bottom two
Brunetts	3	"Word Up!"	Safe
Alice	4	"Give Me One Reason"	Bottom two
Matteo Brento	5	"La notte"	Safe
Edea Demaliaj	6	"Piece of My Heart"	Safe
Floriana Rexhepi	7	"The Power of Love"	Safe
Manuel Moscati	8	"Uptown Funk"	Safe
Final showdown details
Dilan Reka	1	"Somebody to Love"	Safe
Alice	2	"Red"	Eliminated

Judges' votes to eliminate

- Alban Skënderaj: Dilan Reka
- Bleona Qereti: Alice
- Miriam Cani: Alice
- Pandi Laço: Alice

==== Week 9 (20 April 2015) ====
Contestants' performances on the ninth live show
Act	Order	Song	Result
Manuel Moscati	1	"Mentre tutto scorre"	Safe
Dilan Reka	2	"Earth Song"	Safe
Brunetts	3	"Bang Bang"	Bottom two
Matteo Brento	4	"A te"	Bottom two
Edea Demaliaj	5	"Chandelier"	Safe
Genti Deda	6	"Lego House"	Safe
Floriana Rexhepi	7	"All the Man That I Need"	Safe
Final showdown details
Matteo Brento	1	"[[]]"	Safe
Brunetts	2	"Mamma Knows Best"	Eliminated

Judges' votes to eliminate

- Pandi Laço: Matteo Brento
- Miriam Cani: Brunetts
- Bleona Qereti: Brunetts
- Alban Skënderaj: Brunetts

==== Week 10 (27 April 2015) ====
Contestants' performances on the tenth live show
Act	Order	Song	Result
Matteo Brento	1	"Sono già solo"	Bottom two
Floriana Rexhepi	2	"River Deep – Mountain High"	Safe
Dilan Reka	3	"I Don't Want to Miss a Thing"	Safe
Manuel Moscati	4	"Careless Whisper"	Bottom two
Genti Deda	5	"Make It Rain"	Safe
Edea Demaliaj	6	"GoldenEye"	Safe
Final showdown details
Matteo Brento	1	"[[]]"	Eliminated
Manuel Moscati	2	"[[]]"	Safe

Judges' votes to eliminate

- Alban Skënderaj: Matteo Brento
- Bleona Qereti: Manuel Moscati
- Miriam Cani: Matteo Brento
- Pandi Laço: Matteo Brento

==== Week 11 (4 May 2015) ====
Contestants' performances on the eleventh live show
Act	Order	Song	Result
Floriana Rexhepi	1	"Anytime You Need a Friend"	Safe
Dilan Reka	2	"Nobody's Perfect"	Safe
Edea Demaliaj	3	"Holding Out for a Hero"	Safe
Genti Deda	4	"Sorry Seems to Be the Hardest Word"	Safe
Manuel Moscati	5	"Sugar"	Safe
No Final Showdown

==== Week 12 (11 May 2015) ====
Contestants' performances on the twelfth live show
Act	Order	Song	Result
Manuel Moscati	1	"Volare"	Bottom two
Dilan Reka	2	"One Moment in Time"	Safe
Floriana Rexhepi	3	"Happy"	Bottom two
Genti Deda	4	"Set Fire to the Rain"	Safe
Edea Demaliaj	5	"Hallelujah"	Safe
Final showdown details
Manuel Moscati	1	"[[]]"	Safe
Floriana Rexhepi	2	"Listen"	Eliminated

Judges' votes to eliminate

- Alban Skënderaj: Floriana Rexhepi
- Miriam Cani: Manuel Moscati
- Bleona Qereti: Floriana Rexhepi
- Pandi Laço: Floriana Rexhepi

==== Week 13 (18 May 2015) ====
- Musical guest: Elhaida Dani ("I'm Alive")

Contestants' performances on the thirteenth live show
Act	Order	Song	Result
Manuel Moscati	1	"Rastesi"	Bottom two
Edea Demaliaj	2	"Hurt"	Bottom two
Dilan Reka	3	"Domino"	Safe
Genti Deda	4	"Lady"	Safe
Final showdown details
Manuel Moscati	1	"[[]]"	Eliminated
Edea Demaliaj	2	"I Dreamed a Dream"	Safe

Judges' votes to eliminate

- Alban Skënderaj: Edea Demaliaj
- Miriam Cani: Manuel Moscati
- Pandi Laço: Manuel Moscati
- Bleona Qereti: Manuel Moscati
