= Lejla Hot =

Lejla Hot Лејла Хот
- Born: 9 April 1986 (age 40); Belgrade, SR Serbia, SFR Yugoslavia
- Genres: Pop
- Occupations: Singer; songwriter
- Instrument: Vocals
- Years active: 2002–present

Lejla Hot (Serbian: Лејла Хот; born 9 April 1986) is a Serbian pop singer, musician, and songwriter.

She was born in Belgrade, SR Serbia, SFR Yugoslavia and finished Musical High School "Mokranjac" in Belgrade in section solo singing and piano and then graduated at the Belgrade Music Academy (section piano). At the age of 16 she participated in a Music Show called 3K-Dur with a notable role in the final.

She also entered the first ever Serbian Pop Idol competition, Idol Show. After that, together with three other finalists from the show, she formed a band named Lu Lu which took part in the Beovizija 2005 Festival and qualified to the National Final for the Serbo-Montenegrin entry selection for the Eurovision Song Contest 2005 – Evropesma.

As a solo artist, Lejla took part in the Music Festival Budva in 2006. Her popularity rose after winning first the New Artists and the Final night of the Sunčane Skale 2007 festival with the song Suza Stihova written by Danijel Alibabić. She also took place at several most important festivals in country, region and Europe like Beovizija (Serbia), Pjesma mediterana (Budva, Montenegro "Best song and best performance prize"), Slavianski Bazar (Belarus "Special prize").

She just finished her first CD "Hot mi je prezime" (City Records) and promoting it.

== Studio albums ==
=== "Hot mi je prezime" ===
The official track listing:

- Suza stihova (Sunčane Skale 2007)
- Da tvom srcu toplo je (2007)
- Da si tu (Beovizija 2008)
- Pola sunca (Pjesma Mediterana 2008)
- Kad pomislim na tebe (Radijski Festival 2008)
- Čekajući princa (Beovizija 2009)
- Zar me je tako teško voleti (Pjesma Mediterana 2010)
- Hot mi je prezime
- Sta je ljubav
- Otkucaj
- Kad drugom srce dam

Awards and achievements
Preceded by Milena Vučić	Sunčane Skale winner 2007	Succeeded by Aleksandra Bučevac
