= Elhaida Dani =

Albanian singer-songwriter (born 1993)

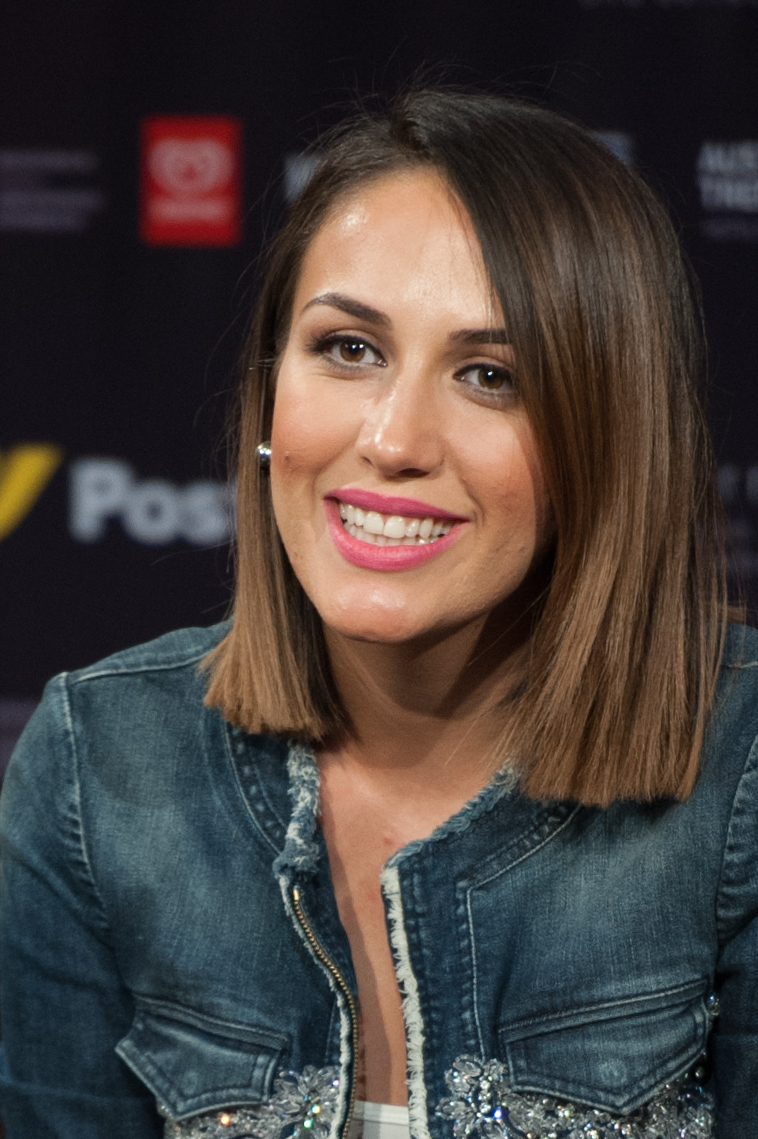
- Dani at the Eurovision Song Contest 2015
- Born: 17 February 1993 (age 33); Shkodër, Albania
- Education: University of Arts, Tirana, Albania
- Occupation: Singer
- Years active: 2008–present
- Musical career
- Genre: Pop-rock
- Instruments: Vocals, piano
- Label: Folé Publishing

Elhaida Dani (Albanian: [ɛlˈhajda daˈni]; born 17 February 1993) is an Albanian singer-songwriter. Born and raised in Shkodër, Dani performed in diverse singing competitions and started to play piano as a child. She rose to national recognition in the Albanian-speaking Balkans, after her victories at Star Academy Albania, Top Fest and Festivali i Këngës. In Italy, she is also prominent for being the winner of the first series of The Voice of Italy. Dani represented Albania in the Eurovision Song Contest 2015 with the song "I'm Alive", after she won the 53rd edition of Festivali i Këngës. She participated in Kënga Magjike for the first time in 2017 with the song "E Ngrirë" whereas she finished second. She rose again great popularity in Italy as well as in France upon her international acting debut in the musical of Notre-Dame de Paris.

== Life and career ==
=== 1993–2012: Early life and career beginnings ===
Elhaida Dani was born on 17 February 1993 into an Albanian family in the city of Shkodër, Albania. She started singing at the age of four and subsequently took piano lesson. She later studied musicology at the University of Arts in Tirana. Dani started her initial forays into the music industry in 2009 as she won a multitude of music festivals, including Star Academy, Sunčane Skale, Festivalul George Grigoriu and Nova Musica. In December 2011, she attempted to represent Albania in the Eurovision Song Contest 2012, following her unsuccessful participation at the 50th edition of Festivali i Këngës with the song "Mijëra vjet". In June 2012, she was chosen as the winner of the ninth edition of Top Fest with the song "S'je më".

=== 2013–2015: The Voice of Italy and Eurovision ===
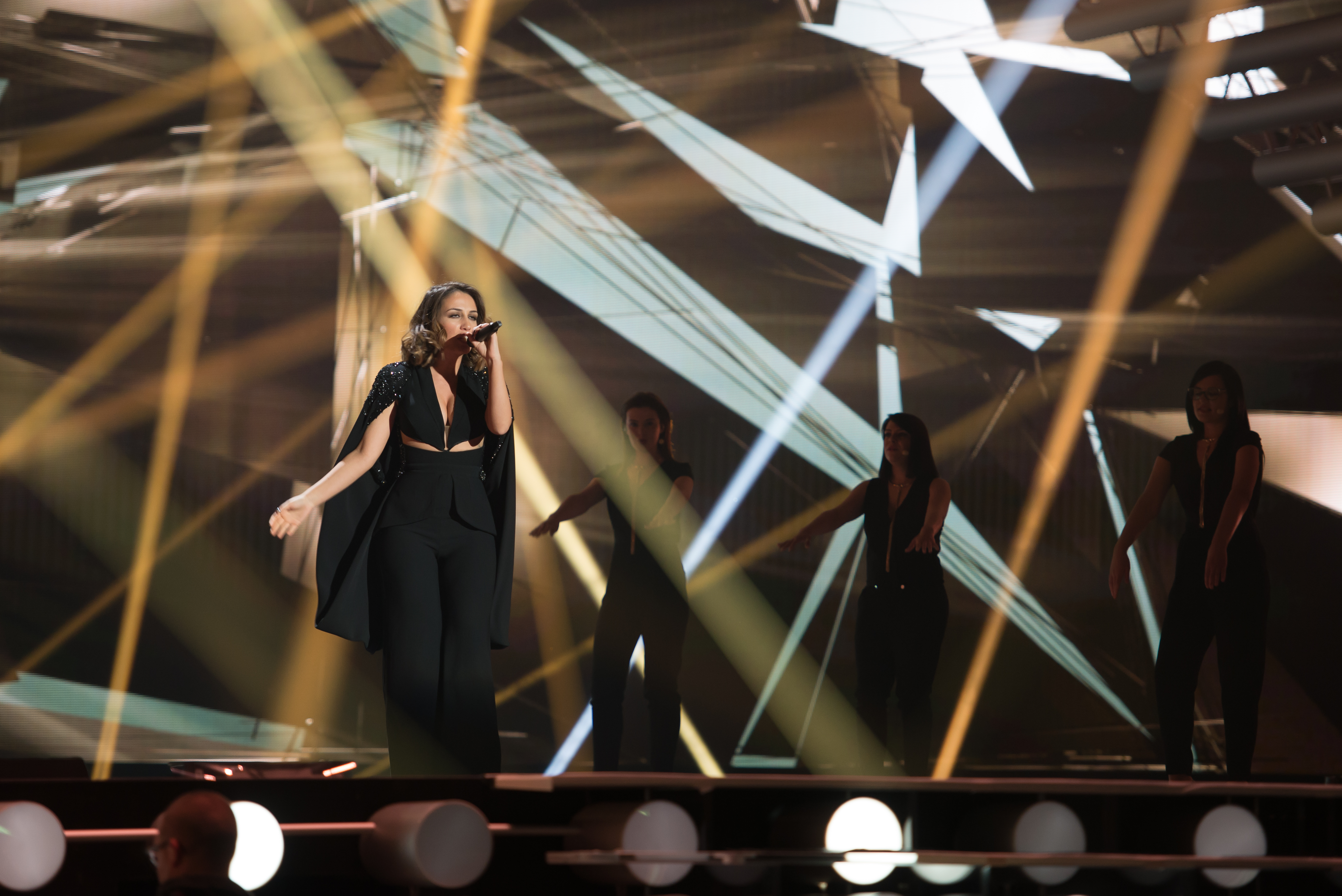
Dani performing at the Eurovision Song Contest 2015 in Vienna, Austria.

In March 2013, Dani successfully auditioned for the first season of The Voice of Italy singing "Mamma Knows Best" for judges Piero Pelù, Raffaella Carrà, Riccardo Cocciante and Noemi and persuaded all four coaches to turn their chairs and chose to compete as one of the members of Team Cocciante. Dani received high scores in the time of her tenure on the show and ultimately won the competition in the final in May 2013 with over 70% of the votes. Later that year, she signed a record contract with the Italian subsidiary label of Universal Music.

In October 2014, the broadcaster, Radio Televizioni Shqiptar (RTSH), announced Dani as one of the contestants selected to compete in the 53rd edition of Festivali i Këngës with the song "Diell". She emerged as the winner of Festivali i Këngës and was thus confirmed as Albania's representative for the Eurovision Song Contest 2015. After being selected, Dani announced that she had changed her song to "I'm Alive", due to the composer's withdrawal of "Diell". In the contest, Albania qualified for the grand final during the first semi-final and ultimately finished in the 17th place with a total of 34 points.

=== 2016–present: Notre-Dame de Paris and continued success ===
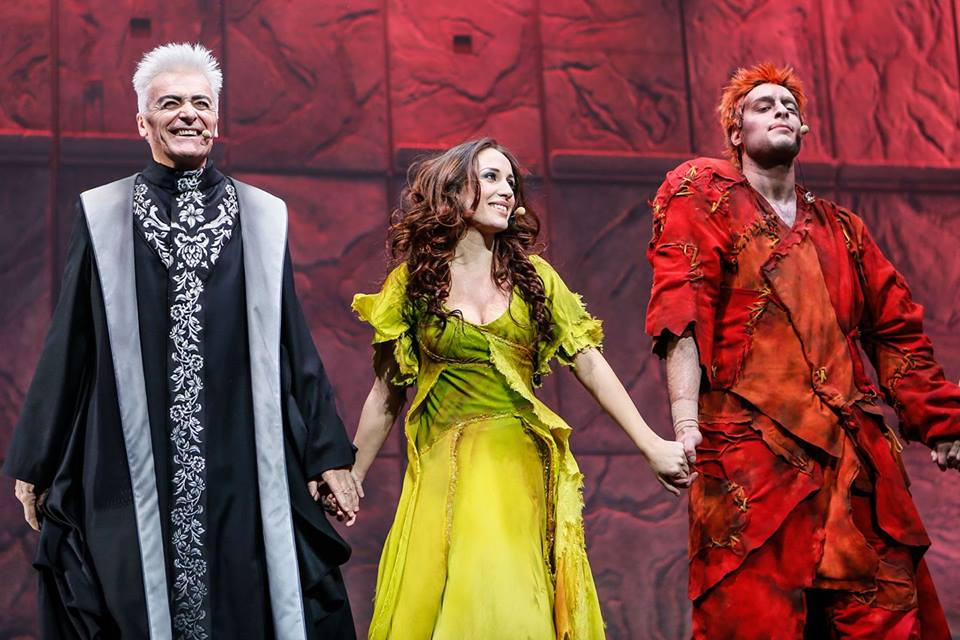
Dani as Esmeralda on Notre Dame de Paris

In 2016, she has been called by Riccardo Cocciante and Luc Plamondon to play the role of Esmeralda in the world renown musical Notre Dame de Paris. And since 2016 she is touring worldwide. In December she competed in Kënga Magjike ending up in second place with 988 points. Returning after a three-year absence, Dani released her second extended play Zanin on 20 September 2021, which she created with Albanian songwriters and producers such as Alban Kondi, Elgit Doda, Endrit Mumajesi and Kledi Bahiti. In 2022-23, she competed on the 8th season of Dancing with the Stars Albania, getting the maximum jury points on several occasions during the live shows, and finishing third overall. December 2022 Elhaida Dani released a new single “Vetja”. The song is written by Kledi Bahiti.

== Discography ==
=== Extended plays ===
Title	Album details	Peak chart positions
Title	Album details	ITA
Elhaida Dani	Released: 1 January 2013; Label: Universal Music; Formats: CD, digital download	28
Zanin	Released: 20 September 2021; Label: Independent; Formats: Digital download and streaming	—
"—" denotes a recording that did not chart or was not released in that territory.

=== Singles ===
==== As lead artist ====
Title	Year	Album or EP
"Fjala e fundit"	2008	Non-album singles
"Si asnjëhere"	2010	Non-album singles
"Mijëra vjet"	2011	Non-album singles
"S'je më"	2012	Non-album singles
"Baciami e basta"	2013	Elhaida Dani
"When Love Calls Your Name"	2013	Elhaida Dani
"Diell"	2014	Non-album singles
"I'm Alive"	2015	Non-album singles
"Më mbaj" (featuring Dj Olti)	2017	Non-album singles
"E ngrirë"	2017	Non-album singles
"Let It Go (Lascerò)" (with Nathaniel)	2018	Non-album singles

=== Other charted songs ===
Title	Year	Peak chart positions	Album
Title	Year	ALB	Album
"Zanin"	2021	1	Zanin
"Jam betu"	2021	2	Zanin
"Amore"	2021	9	Zanin
"Kënga jonë"	2021	26	Zanin
"Hajmali"	2021	24	Zanin
"—" denotes a recording that did not chart or was not released in that territory.

Awards and achievements
Preceded by N/A	The Voice of Italy winner 2013	Succeeded by Suor Cristina Scuccia
Preceded by Hersi Matmuja with "Zemërimi i një nate"	Festivali i Këngës; Winner; 2014	Succeeded by Eneda Tarifa with "Përallë"
Preceded by Hersi Matmuja with "One Night's Anger"	Albania in the Eurovision Song Contest; 2015	Succeeded by Eneda Tarifa with "Fairytale"
