= Damir Čičić =

Damir Čičić Дамир Чичић
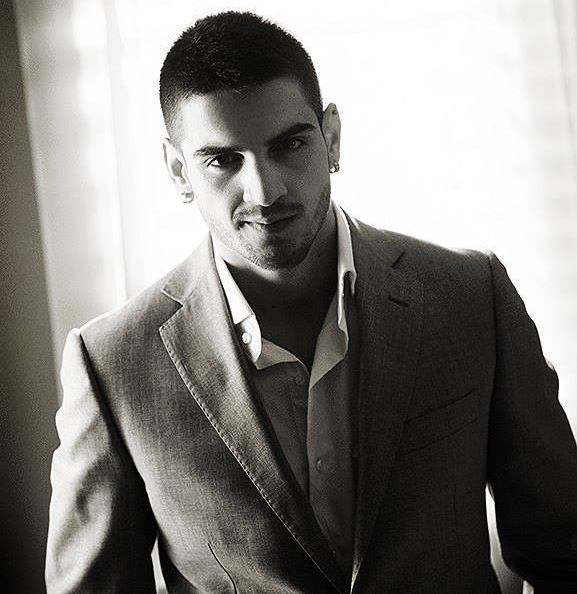
- Damir Čičić at the recording of "Ljubavi nema"

Background information
- Also known as: Čile
- Born: Damir Čičić; July 6, 1994 (age 32)
- Origin: Prijepolje, Serbia, Yugoslavia
- Genres: Pop
- Occupation: Singer
- Instrument: Multi-instrumentalist
- Years active: 2008–present
- Label: Flah Entertainment

Damir Čičić (Serbian: Дамир Чичић) is a Serbian pop singer, songwriter, multi-instrumentalist and producer. He lives and works in the Serbian capital Belgrade.

== Biography ==
Damir Čičić was born on July 6, 1994, in Prijepolje, Serbia. He finished secondary music school 'Artimedia' and the Academy of music production BK University. His first public performance was at the Bum Fest in 2008 with the song "Čija si", which won him first place. His second performance was at Sunčane Skale with the song "Boje Ljubavi", which won him 6th place. He became famous because of singing in Serbian most popular clubs.

== Discography ==
=== Singles ===
- Progresne su oci
- Ljubavi nema
