= Sunčane Skale 2007 =

Pop music festival in Montenegro

Sunčane Skale 2007 is the thirteenth edition of Sunčane Skale, an annual pop festival held in Montenegro.

== Day 2 - Nove zvijezde ==
Place	Singer	Song	Points
1	(Serbia) Lejla Hot	Suza stihova	84
2	(Montenegro) Anja Mašanović	Boje jutra	68
3	(North Macedonia) Bravo Band	Ne bih te menjao	63
4	(Serbia) D.I.S. Time	Ne pitaj za mene	61
5	(Bosnia and Herzegovina) Armin Muzaferija	Povedi me	59
6	(Montenegro) Ivan Čanović	Moja djevojka	49
7	(Serbia) Slavica Bajčeta	Alfa i omega	43
8	(Slovenia) Funky Tina	Sexy reševalec	31
9	(Slovenia) Martin Perović	Lazi me	30
10	(Montenegro) Nađa Đikanović	Neodoljiva	28
11	(Montenegro) Luka Đurđević	Jedna	22
12	(Serbia) Padrino Band	I tvoj i njen	21
12	(Croatia) Tamara	Smrznuta	21
14	(Montenegro) Iva Kostić	Slatkorječivi	19
15	(North Macedonia) Dimitar & Elena	Biće dobro sve	18
16	(Montenegro) Hildegard Milinović	Skandal	14
17	(Montenegro) Jelena Đorđević	Kriva ili nevina	13
18	(Serbia) Danka Ubiparip	Budi moj	12
19	(North Macedonia) Petar Mehandžiski	Nula od coveka	10
20	(Serbia) Aleksandra Saičić	Mesec od papira	9
21	(Serbia) Milan Jeftović	Nisam te zaslužio	8
21	(Serbia) Dunja Cervicki	Luda za tobom	8
22	(Serbia) Vladan Savić	Namerno	5

== Day 3 - Pjesma ljeta ==
Place	Singer	Song	Points
1	(Serbia) Lejla Hot	Suze stihova	76
2	(North Macedonia) Martin Vučić	Biber i čokolada	71
3	(Montenegro) Bojan Delić	Otvoreno	65
3	(Croatia) Ivana Banfić	Kao cvijet iz kamena	65
5	(Bosnia and Herzegovina) Boris Režak	Pitaju me ljudi	59
6	(Italy) Massimo Bertacci	Darei l' anima	53
7	(Montenegro) Knez	Jednom mila	48
8	(Montenegro) Jelena Kažanegra	Letim	47
9	(North Macedonia) Arensi Bend	Jet set	45
9	(Serbia) Mari Mari	Tri tačke	45
11	(Serbia) Željko Vasić	Samo da dobro si	41
12	(Albania) Mariza Ikonomi	Ne kete vend	34
12	(Serbia) Katarina "Kaća" Sotirović	Zauvek i jedan dan	34
14	(Croatia) Feminnem	Nije moje srce, nije	33
15	(North Macedonia) Lambe	Poslednja noć	31
16	(Bulgaria) Stefan Iličev	Blizu do men	29
17	(Croatia) Ivo Gamulin	Pjesak vremena	28
18	(Slovenia) Miro Todosovski	Nije bol	27
19	(Slovenia) Sexplosion	Stewardesa	25
20	(Serbia) Luna	SMS	18
21	(Croatia) Minea	Kap	15
22	(Croatia) Maja Šuput	Sjutra u podne	14
23	(Germany) Oliver Hans & (Montenegro) Dan poslije	After ten years at sea	12
24	(Serbia) Aleksandra Perović	Talija	7
25	(Italy) Elizabeth "Betty" Belle	Giorno in giorno	6
