= Milo Bošković =

National hero of Yugoslavia (1911–1944)

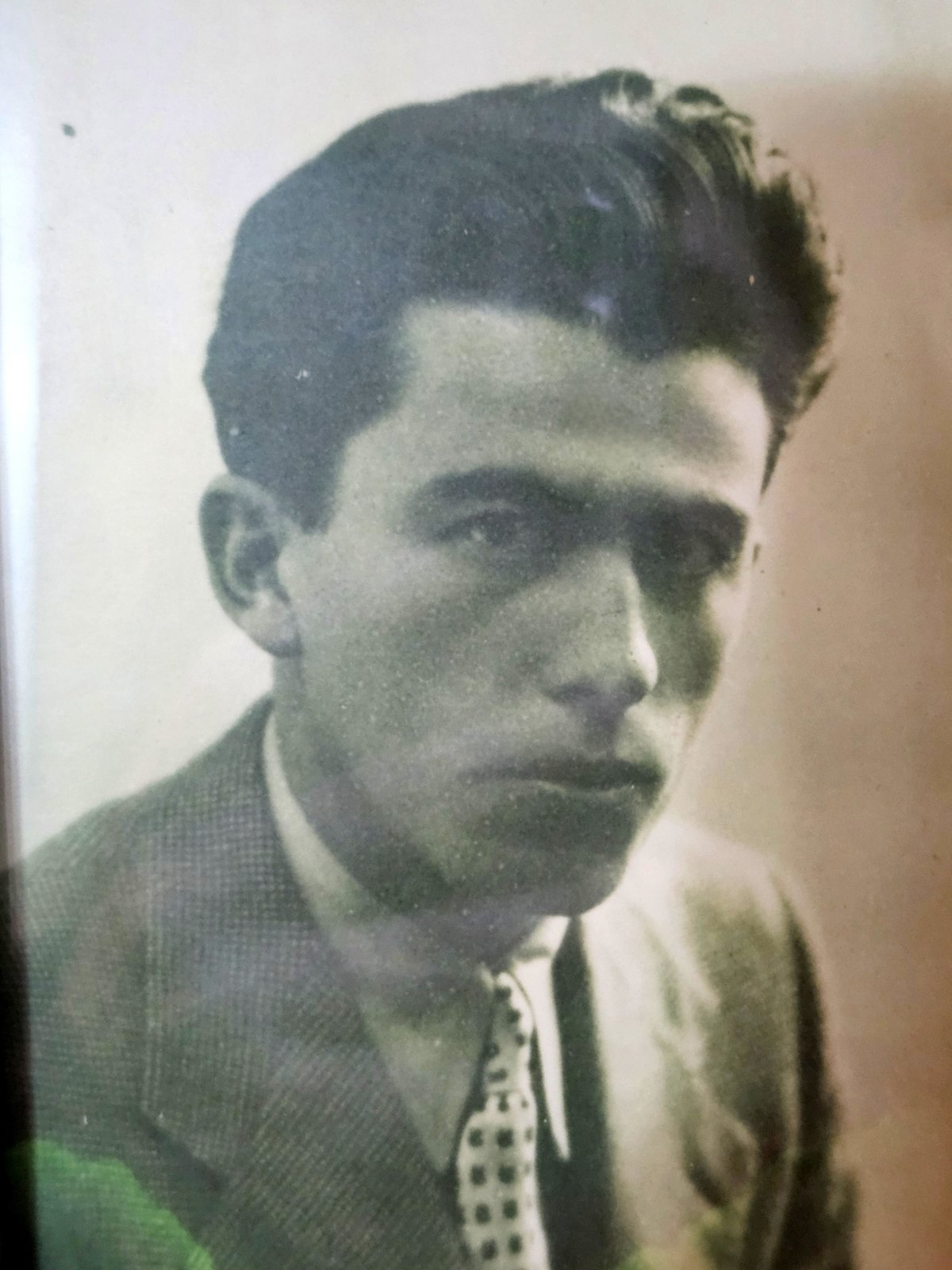
- Born: 20 October 1911; Brčeli, Kingdom of Montenegro
- Died: 21 September 1944 (aged 32); Jasenovac concentration camp
- Occupation: Physician

Milo Bošković (Cyrillic: Мило Бошковић; 20 October 1911 – 21 September 1944) was a physician, participant in the National Liberation War and national hero of Yugoslavia.

== Biography ==
=== Education ===
He was born on 20 October 1911 in the Montenegrin village of Gornji Brčeli, in Crmnica, near the coastal city and port of Bar. His father Ivo worked in the United States, and Milo stayed in Montenegro with his mother and brothers. He finished elementary school in his hometown, and high school in Cetinje. He studied medicine at the University of Bologna, where he graduated in 1937 with the highest possible grade of 110 of 110. After returning to the country, he served his military service until 1938. He came to Belgrade just before the outbreak of the Second World War. As a doctor, he specialized in parasitology and was employed as an assistant at the Bacteriological Institute of the Faculty of Veterinary Medicine in Belgrade. During 1941, he was also employed as an assistant at the Faculty of Medicine.

=== Secret print shop in Nazi occupied Yugoslavia ===
At first, he was a fellow traveller, and since 1940. a member of the Communist Party of Yugoslavia (CPY). During German occupation of Yugoslavia, according to a party assignment, he rented a house at Banjički venac 12, in Belgrade in July 1941. He was a member of the CPY, but unknown to the Belgrade police because he studied abroad. In the basement of house was located the secret print shop of the Communist Party of Yugoslavia. A special closet was placed to hide the secret entrance to the basement of the pressroom. Because of the conspiracy, Bošković opened a doctor's office in the house. Then he formally married Zagorka Zaga Jovanović, a medical student and a worker at a printing office.

In December 1941 Milo became suspicious at the Veterinary Faculty that he was a Freemason, so he decided in agreement with Blagoje Nešković, to gradually stop going to the faculty. At the beginning of January 1942, Milo was wanted by the German police, on suspicion of being an "English spy". While the police entered the house, he hid quickly in the basement closet, where the secret print shop was located. Zaga then gave the police an explanation that Milo had gone to his relatives out of Belgrade. Police then searched the house, but found nothing suspicious. A week later, another German patrol came by the house and brought a new invitation for Bosković to report to the Gestapo. The party organization then decided that Bosković is no longer legal tenant of the house, so he started hiding in the secret print shop.

=== Arrest ===
Due to his safety, as well as the security of the print shop in the house, Milo travelled to Zagreb in July 1942, on a party assignment, with false documents. He met with Ivanka Muačević-Nikoliš in Zagreb on 14 July. With help of Ivanka he was supposed to get in touch with the Yugoslav Partisans in the liberated territory. While they were walking down the street, an Ustaše policeman recognized Ivanka and immediately arrested both of them.

According to a claim by Svetozar Bucalović, author of a book written about Bošković, published in 2019, it has never been determined who directed Milo Bošković to Ivanka Muačević-Nikoliš to be his liaison in Zagreb. That was someone’s huge mistake because Ivanka was very well known to the police. The party leaders should have never decided to send a compromised person to get in contact with another person that wasn’t suspected of doing anything wrong. He was tortured and beaten in prison. They smashed out all of his front teeth and then threw him from the second floor of the police building. Although with a broken leg, Milo did not admit anything, neither about his activity nor about the secret print shop in Belgrade.

=== Death in concentration camp ===
Since Bošković did not admit anything, they transferred him to the Stara Gradiška concentration camp, and at the end of December 1942 to Jasenovac concentration camp. Together with several inmates, he was preparing to escape, but the guards discovered them. After another terrible torture, he was sentenced to death by hanging. On the day of the execution of his death sentence, 21 September 1944, he appeared in front of the camp commander Dinko Šakić, protesting the way the sentence was carried out. He said: "I am a son of Montenegro, and I protest against this shameful way of carrying out the death sentence. In our country, people are killed with guns." After Sakic decided to fulfill his "last wish", Milo refused to turn his back and put on a black bandage to cover his eyes.

On 27 November 1953, Boskovic was declared a national hero of Yugoslavia by decree of the President of the Federative People's Republic of Yugoslavia, Josip Broz Tito.

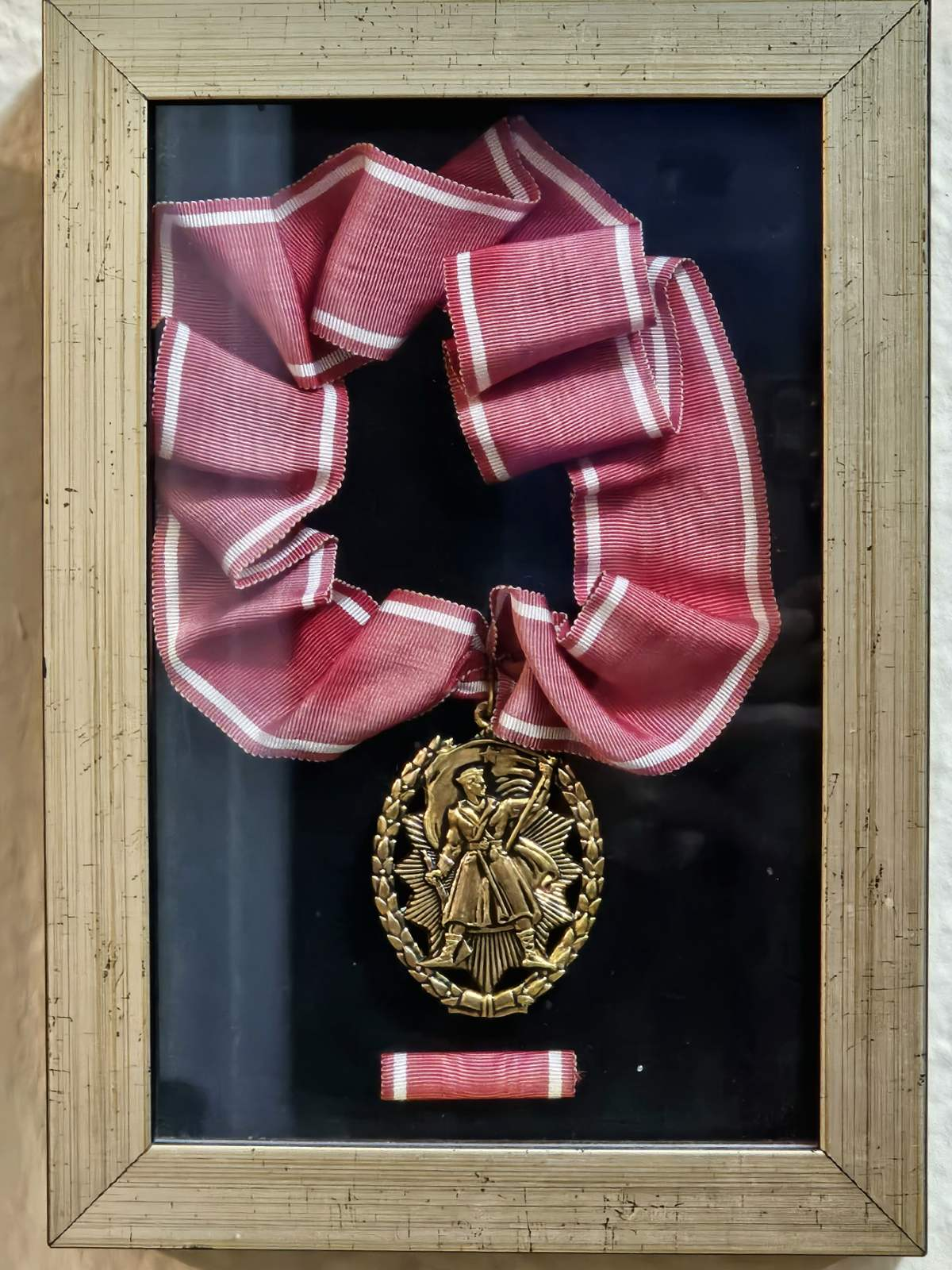
Order of the People's Hero of Milo Bošković

=== Distinguished brothers Bošković ===
Milo Bošković had two younger brothers – Đuro and Petar. His brother Đuro Bošković (1914–1945) was a lawyer, a revolutionary, a participant in the National Liberation struggle, and a member of (OZNA) the security agency of Yugoslavia that existed between 1944 and 1952. Đuro became particularly prominent during the World War II battle of Sutjeska when he reported to the military commanding staff that even though they lost two-thirds of the fighters, they could count on them as being in full force. He died after the war in a gunfight against the Chetniks as an officer of OZNA (Security Agency of communist Yugoslavia).

His brother Petar Bošković (1931–2011) was a Yugoslav and Serbian diplomat. He was an ambassador of the Socialist Federal Republic of Yugoslavia to the Republic of Cyprus. In 1999, he was a witness at the trial of Jasenovac camp commander Dinko Šakić, who was then sentenced to 20 years in prison. Their sister Velika was a fighter in the Yugoslav Partisans movement engaged with the Fourth Proletarian Montenegrin task force brigade.

=== Museum ===
The house where the printing press was housed and where Milo Bosković lived was converted on May 1, 1950, into a museum dedicated to the secret printing press and was part of the Belgrade City Museum. The museum exhibit represented the work of all printing presses that operated during the occupation in the territory of Belgrade. In the same year, a commemorative plaque was placed on the house, and on 17 May 1965 the building was declared a cultural monument of exceptional importance. The museum was closed to visitors in August 2000 and the house was returned to its heirs after a legal dispute with the Administrative authorities of the Municipality of Belgrade.

=== The TV series ===
The work of the secret printing press of the Central Committee of the party, as well as Milo's bravery, self-sacrifice, patriotism, and overall contribution to the war, are described in many books dealing with the national liberation war in Belgrade, and a separate highlight of the unique aspects describing the printing press's work was given by Dragan Marković in the book "The Written Offs". During the filming of the famous and very popular TV series in the former Yugoslavia Otpisani("The Written Offs"), the writers devoted an episode to her work entitled "The Printing Office". Also, the names of the characters have been changed, whenever instead of Dr. Bosković and student Zagorka, doctor Jankovic (Zoran Milosavljević) and Olivera (Svetlana Bojković) appear.

== Literature ==
- Narodni heroji Jugoslavije (PDF). Belgrade: Narodna knjiga. 1982.
- Ćetković, Borivoje (5 March 2020). "dr Milo Bošković – Revolucionar dorastao ideji, Podvizi i smrt heroja u jasenovačkom paklu". Dan.
- Ćetković, Borivoje (6 March 2020). "Crnogorac nikad ne kleči". Dan.
- Ćetković, Borivoje (7 March 2020). "Izabrao otpor i herojsku smrt kličući komunizmu". Dan.
- Bucalović, Svetozar (2019). Dr Milo Bošković, ilegalna štamparija u okupiranom Beogradu. Belgrade: CID. ISBN 978-8-6804-4626-4.
- Bucalović, Svetozar (14 June 2019). "Blede sećanja na ilegalnu štampariju CK". Politika.
- "Bošković Iva Milo". znaci.org.
- Zgrada ilegalnih partijskih štamparija
