= Đuro Bošković =

Yugoslav lawyer and revolutionary of the National Liberation struggle

- Born: 6 February 1914; Brčeli, Kingdom of Montenegro
- Died: 2 May 1945 (aged 31); Belgrade, Yugoslavia
- Occupation: lawyer
- Known for: Defense of Supreme Headquarters and Marshal Tito at battle of Sutjeska

Đuro Bošković (Brčeli, February 6, 1914 – Belgrade, May 2, 1945) was a Yugoslav lawyer, revolutionary, participant of the National Liberation struggle and an officer of the Department for People's Protection (OZNA). Bošković became particularly prominent during the World War II battle of Sutjeska when he reported to the military commanding staff that even though they lost two-thirds of the fighters, they could count on them as being in full force.

== Biography ==
=== Family ===
Đuro Ivov Bošković was born on February 6, 1914, in the Montenegrin village of Gornji Brčeli, in Crmnica, near the coastal city and port of Bar. His father Ivo worked in the United States, and Đuro stayed in Montenegro with his mother and brothers. He had two prominent brothers, Petar Bošković and Milo Bošković. Petar Bošković was a Yugoslav and Serbian diplomat. He was an ambassador of the Socialist Federal Republic of Yugoslavia to the Republic of Cyprus. Đuro's older brother national hero Milo Bošković (1911–1944) was killed in 1944 in the Jasenovac concentration camp. Their sister Velika was a fighter in the Yugoslav Partisans movement engaged with the Fourth Proletarian Montenegrin task force brigade.

=== Revolutionary work ===
Đuro Bošković finished elementary and high school in Montenegro. As a high school student in 1933 he became a member of the Communist Party of Yugoslavia (CPY). The same year he distinguished himself during the strike of high school students. He graduated from the University of Belgrade Faculty of Law. Later on, Bošković worked as a lawyer. He returned in 1939 to Montenegro following a party assignment. He was arrested and taken first to Bar, then to Belgrade, and at the end he was taken to Velika Kikinda.

=== In the partisans ===
He participated in the National Liberation struggle right from the start of the 13 July Uprising. Chetniks courts in Montenegro published a list of 84 prominent partisans, for whom a bounty had been placed for their capture. The Italian occupation force offered money for bounties. A bounty of 25,000 Italian liras was placed for the capture of Đuro Bošković, so he was among the 20 partisans with a bounty exceeding the amount of 20,000 liras. In June 1942, he was the deputy political commissar of the 3rd unit within the 1st battalion of the Lovcen partisan detachment. The Lovcen partisan detachment became later a part of the Fourth Proletarian Montenegrin Strike Brigade. Bošković was appointed as a political commissar of the 1st unit of the 1st Battalion of the Fourth Proletarian Montenegrin Strike Brigade. His sister Bošković Velika, born in 1920, was a fellow soldier with his unit. Together with the brigade, he went through many battles, and distinguished himself in the Battle of Manjača on September 18 and 19 1942. After the successful completion of his mission, he headed with the unit in the direction of strongest enemy resistance.

=== Heroic defense at Battle of Sutjeska ===
He was in the Second Dalmatian Brigade from November 1942. He particularly stood out during the Battle of Sutjeska. He was the political commissar of the 2nd battalion of the Second Dalmatian Brigade. They held an important position at Gornje Bare, where they prevented the penetration of huge German Nazi forces. He repeatedly encouraged the fighters and emphasized that behind them the entire Supreme Headquarters found itself encircled, together with the central hospital in the Sutjeska Valley, and that therefore they could not retreat. When only fifty of them remained alive in the entire battalion, they decided to sacrifice their own lives, but not to let the enemy pass. He and battalion commander Branko Mirković reported on June 8, 1943, to the brigade headquarters that the Germans attacked, that they lost two-thirds of their personnel, but that they could be counted on as if they were in full force. That message, worthy of the ancient Greek heroes in the Battle of Thermopylae, was passed on to Marshal Tito. At that time, the wounded, Marshal Tito and the Supreme Headquarters were at risk in Sutjeska, and with their heroism they prevented the breakthrough of large German forces into the Sutjeska valley. The heroic message that they can be counted on as if they were in full force, even though they lost two-thirds of the fighters, is also mentioned in the 60th minute of the film Battle of Sutjeska.

=== Post-war career ===
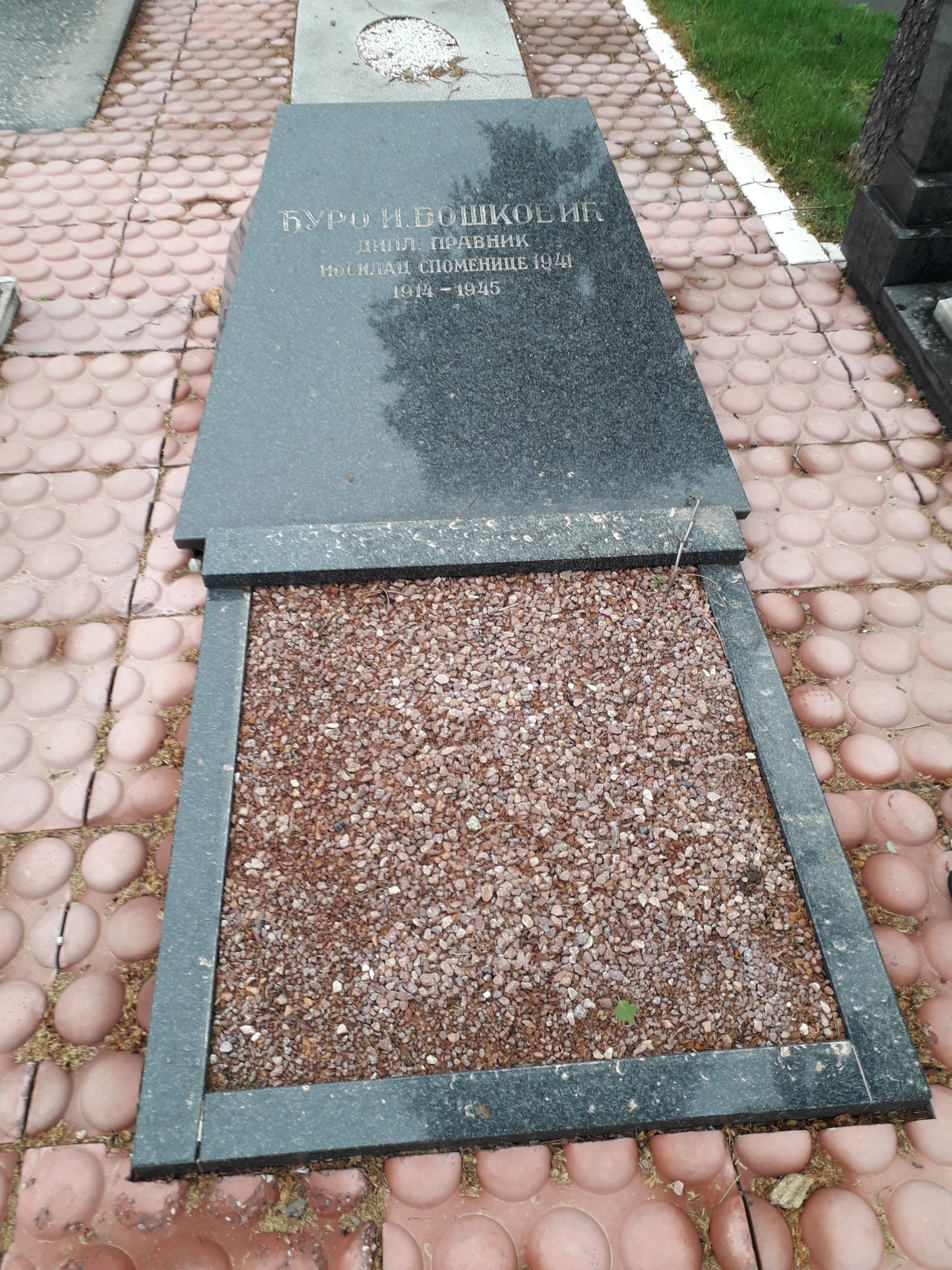
Grave of Đuro Bošković in the Alley of National Heroes at the Belgrade New Cemetery

He joined the Department of People's Protection (OZNA) in February 1945. Young educated commanders and commissars joined the security agency when it was first established at its headquarters in Belgrade. He was among the five most prominent operatives of Belgrade's Ozna. At that time, there were still a lot of Chetniks and Milan Nedic illegals operating in Belgrade. He launched an operation to capture a prominent Chetnik intelligence officer and commander. The Chetnik commander intended to escape from Belgrade by plane during the May Day celebration, expecting less attention from the security authorities of the new state. However, Ozna discovered his intentions in time, and Đuro Bošković waited for him in an ambush near the Old Belgrade Airport. On the evening of May 1, Đuro Bošković stopped a car with Chetniks, who then opened fire. In that shooting, Bošković and another member of OZNA Stjepan Funarić, were seriously injured. Immediately after the shooting the Chetniks were chased by members of the security forces and shot dead. Severely wounded Đuro Bošković was transported to the hospital, where he died on May 2, 1945. He was buried in the Alley of National Heroes at the Belgrade New Cemetery.

== Literature ==
- Dedijer, Vladimir (1953). Prilozi za biografiju Josipa Broza Tita tom II. Beograd: „Kultura".
- Zbornik dokumenata i podataka o Narodnooslobodilačkom ratu jugoslovenskih naroda, tom 3, knjiga 4. Beograd: Vojnoizdavački zavod. 1953.
- Sutjeska, Zbornik radova, knjiga 5. Beograd: Vojnoizdavački zavod. 1961.
- Pali nepobeđeni 1944—1964. Beograd: Savezni odbor za proslavu dvadeste godišnjice službe unutarnje bezbednosti. 1964.
- Četvrta proleterska crnogorska brigada Zbornik sećanja. Beograd: Vojnoizdavački zavod. 1969.
- Janković, Blažo (1975). Četvrta proleterska crnogorska brigada. Beograd: Vojnoizdavački zavod.
- Druga dalmatinska proleterska brigada. Split: Institut za historiju radničkog pokreta Dalmacije. 1982.
- Lopušina, Marko (1995). Ubij bližnjeg svog. Beograd.
