= I'm Alive (Elhaida Dani song) =

2015 song by Elhaida Dani

Single by Elhaida Dani
- Released: 1 January 2015
- Genre: Pop; R&B
- Length: 3:06
- Label: RTSH; Universal
- Songwriter: Sokol Marsi
- Producer: Darko Dimitrov

Elhaida Dani singles chronology
"Diell" (2014)	"I'm Alive" (2015)	"Më Mbaj" (2017)

Music video
- "I'm Alive" on YouTube

Eurovision Song Contest 2015 entry
- Country: Albania
- Artist: Elhaida Dani
- Language: English
- Composers: Arbër Elshani; Kristijan Lekaj
- Lyricist: Sokol Marsi

Finals performance
- Semi-final result: 10th
- Semi-final points: 62
- Final result: 17th
- Final points: 34

Entry chronology
- ◄ "One Night's Anger" (2014)
- "Fairytale" (2016) ►

"I'm Alive" is a song by Albanian singer and songwriter Elhaida Dani. It was released as a single on 1 January 2015 by Radio Televizioni Shqiptar (RTSH) and Universal Music. The song was written by Sokol Marsi, arranged by Darko Dimitrov and produced by Zzap & Chriss. The song represented Albania in the Eurovision Song Contest 2015 in Vienna, Austria, after Dani won the pre-selection competition Festivali i Këngës with the song "Diell". The country reached seventeenth place in a field of twenty-six scoring a total of 34 points marking the third year to achieve the seventeenth place.

In order to promote and support the song, Dani made diverse appearances to perform the song and embarked on a small tour in the Netherlands, North Macedonia and the United Kingdom. The accompanying music video for the song was premiered onto the official YouTube channel of the Eurovision Song Contest on 15 March 2015.

== Background and composition ==
In 2014, Elhaida Dani was announced as one of the twenty six contestants selected to compete in the 53rd edition of Festivali i Këngës, a competition for determining Albania's participant for the Eurovision Song Contest 2015. For following the competition's rules, the lyrics of the participating entries had to be in the Albanian language. Dani took part with the song "Diell" composed by Aldo Shllaku and written by Sokol Marsi and Viola Trebicka.

In February 2015, the singer announced through a social media post that the song was withdrawn by the composer, due to personal decisions. "I'm Alive" was simultaneously revealed as the title of the singer's competing entry for the Eurovision Song Contest. The latter song was written in Albanian by Sokol Marsi and translated into English by Lindita Halimi. It was composed and produced by Kosovo-Albanian duo Zzap and Chriss and arranged by Macedonian producer Darko Dimitrov. The song is musically a pop and R&B ballad incorporating modern and ethnic influences. Lyrically, it explores themes of female empowerment and discusses emotions such as love, hope, desire and finding inner strength.

== Critical reception ==
Upon its release, "I'm Alive" received generally positive reviews from music critics. In a review for the song conducted by several Wiwibloggs members, the song's contemporary lyrics, composition and production as well as Dani's vocal delivery were commended. William Lee Adams of the website called the song as the "most expensive-sounding song of the year", while Ramadan Besim described it as "modern, catchy and radio friendly". Overall, the reviewers on the website gave the song a score of 8.02 out of 10 total points.

== Promotion ==
For promotional and supporting purposes, Dani embarked on a small tour between March and April 2015 with live appearances at multiple events, including in Amsterdam, Athens, Budapest, London and Skopje. The same month, she went on to perform the song live on the fourth season of the Albanian television show X Factor. In April 2017, footage of Nathan Trent, the representative of Austria for the Eurovision Song Contest 2015, covering "I'm Alive" was broadcast during his ESC Acoustic Session. Later that year, she performed the Albanian version of the song on the grand final of the 56th edition of Festivali i Këngës. The song was featured in multiple lists of the Eurovision Top 250 charts, from 2015 to 2018. The song's highest position was at number 19 in 2015.

== Music video ==
An accompanying music video for the song was premiered to the official YouTube channel of the Eurovision Song Contest on 15 March 2015. The same day, the video was broadcast on Radio Televizioni Shqiptar (RTSH) at around 20:00 (CET). It prominently makes reference on the diverse role of women in Albanian society, including within highly male-dominated professions. Filmed over three days in Tirana, intercutting scenes portray other females, including a journalist, a doctor, a traffic officer, a firefighter and a flight attendant. The official music video for the Albanian version of the song, "Në jetë", followed in May 2015 and was premiered on the YouTube channels of the Eurovision Song Contest and Radio Televizioni Shqiptar (RTSH).

== At Eurovision ==
=== Festivali i Këngës ===
The national broadcaster of Albania, Radio Televizioni Shqiptar (RTSH), organised the 53rd edition of Festivali i Këngës to determine the country's participant for the Eurovision Song Contest 2015 in Vienna, Austria. It opened a submission period for artists, bands and composers between 14 and 15 October 2014, while a jury panel internally selected 28 songs to participate in the competition's semi-finals. During the end of the grand final, Dani and her Albanian-language song "Diell" was chosen to represent the country at the contest, after gathering 82 total points.

=== Vienna ===
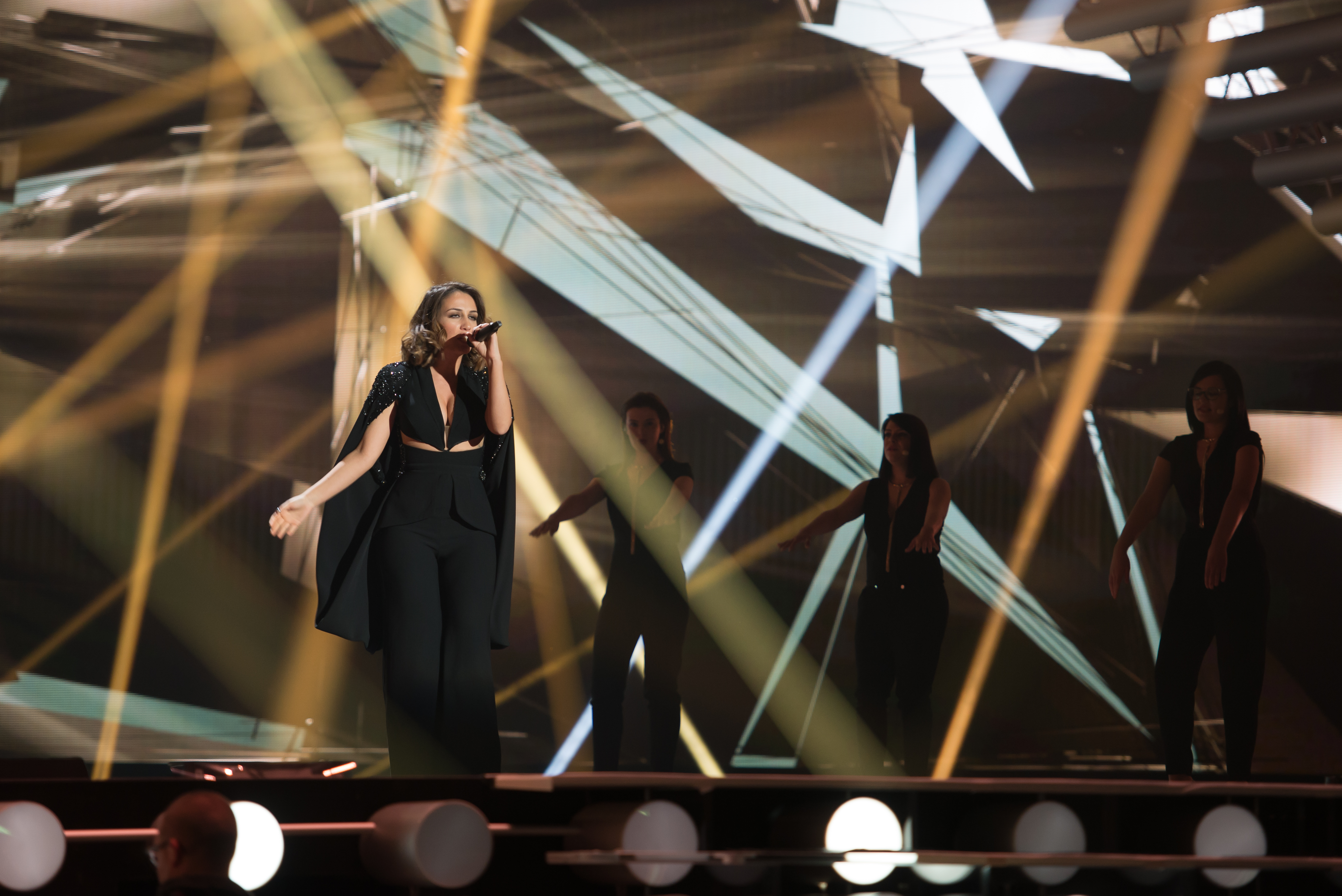
Elhaida Dani performing during a rehearsal before the first semi-final of the Eurovision Song Contest 2015.

The 60th edition of the Eurovision Song Contest took place in Vienna, Austria, and consisted of two semi-finals on 19 and 21 May, and the grand final on 23 May 2015. According to the Eurovision rules, each participating country, except the host country and the "Big Five" including France, Germany, Italy, Spain and the United Kingdom, were required to qualify from one of the two semi-finals to compete for the grand final, although, the top ten countries from the respective semi-final progress to the grand final. On 26 January 2015, it was announced that Albania would be performing in the second half of the first semi-final of the contest.

During the first semi-final, Albania performed fourteenth, following Denmark and preceding Romania, and qualified for the grand final in tenth place with 62 points, ranking tenth by the jury's 61 points and eighth by the televote of 66 points. At the grand final, the country performed twenty sixth, following Russia and preceding the Italy. Albania finished in the seventeenth place in a field of twenty seven with 34 total points, ranking twenty sixth by the jury's 4 points and eighth by the televote of 93 points.

Elhaida Dani's performance begins in yellow and black colours on the LED screens changing throughout his performance to warmer tones consisting of beige and cream colours. The tragedy of the song's message was reflected through broken pieces of glass on the background. The singer was accompanied during her performances by three female backing vocalists.

== Track listing ==
- Digital download
1. "I'm Alive" – 3:06

== Charts ==
Chart (2015)	Peak position
Iceland (Tónlist)	46

== Release history ==
Region	Date	Format(s)	Label	Ref.
United Arab Emirates	1 January 2015	Digital download; streaming	RTSH; Universal	
