= Albania in the Eurovision Song Contest 2015 =

- Eurovision Song Contest 2015
- Participating broadcaster: Radio Televizioni Shqiptar (RTSH)
- Country: Albania
- Selection process: Artist: Festivali i Këngës 53; Song: Internal selection
- Selection date: Artist: 28 December 2014; Song: 15 March 2015

Competing entry
- Song: "I'm Alive"
- Artist: Elhaida Dani
- Songwriters: Sokol Marsi

Placement
- Semi-final result: Qualified (10th, 62 points)
- Final result: 17th, 34 points

Participation chronology

Albania was represented at the Eurovision Song Contest 2015 in Vienna, Austria, with the song "I'm Alive" performed by Elhaida Dani. Dani was chosen through the national selection competition, Festivali i Këngës, organised by Radio Televizioni Shqiptar (RTSH) in December 2014. Dani emerged as the winner of contest with the song "Diell"; however the song withdrawn as the Albanian entry at the request of one of the song's songwriters and replaced with "I'm Alive". Prior to the 2015 contest, Albania had participated in the Eurovision Song Contest 11 times since its first entry in 2004.

"I'm Alive" was promoted by a music video and live performances in the Netherlands and the United Kingdom in the lead up to the contest. Albania was drawn to compete in the first semi-final of the Eurovision Song Contest, which took place on 19 May 2015. Performing 14th, the nation was among the top 10 entries of the first semi-final and therefore qualified to compete in the final. In the final on 23 May, the entry was performed 26th and placed 17th out of the 27 finalists.

== Background ==
Prior to the 2015 contest, Albania had participated in the Eurovision Song Contest 11 times since its first entry in 2004. Its first entry was the song "The Image of You" performed by Anjeza Shahini, which finished in seventh place, the nation's second-highest placing as of 2023. The country's highest placing by 2015 had been fifth, which it achieved in 2012 with the song "Suus" performed by Rona Nishliu. Albania had previously failed to qualify for the final four times, most recently in 2014.

Radio Televizioni Shqiptar (RTSH) was the Albanian broadcaster for the 2015 contest and was tasked with organising the selection process for its entry. The Albanian contest Festivali i Këngës, which has been held every year since 1964, was once again used to select the entry, as had been customary since the nation's contest debut in 2004. Details regarding the 53rd edition of Festivali i Këngës were announced on 12 September 2014, however the Albanian broadcaster formally confirmed their participation in the Eurovision Song Contest 2015 on 1 November 2014.

== Before Eurovision ==
=== Festivali i Këngës ===
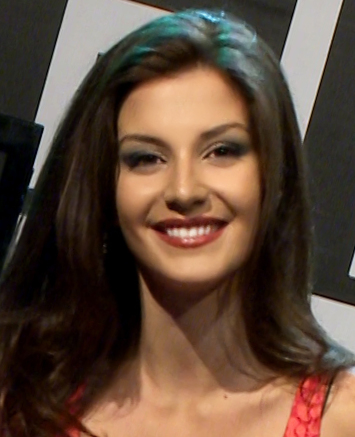
Floriana Garo co-hosted the 53rd edition of Festivali i Këngës.

The national broadcaster of Albania, Radio Televizioni Shqiptar (RTSH), organised the 53rd edition of Festivali i Këngës with the objective of determining the country's entry for the Eurovision Song Contest 2015. The competition consisted of two semi-finals on 26 and 27 December, respectively, and the final on 28 December 2014. The three live shows were held at the Palace of Congresses in Tirana and hosted by Floriana Garo, Turjan Hyska and Liberta Spahiu. Shpetim Saraçi assumed the position of artistic director, while Bledar Laço directed the contest. Mira Tuci was responsible for the screenplay and the music production was led by Alfred Kaçinari and Edmond Zhulali.

==== Competing entries ====
RTSH invited interested artists and composers to submit their entries between 14 and 15 October 2014. All songs were required to be in the Albanian language, all performers were required to be at least 16 years of age, and singers and composers could only submit one song while lyricists could only submit two songs. The broadcaster received approximately 50 submissions. On 30 October 2014, RTSH announced the thirty artists and songs selected for the competition by a special committee. Three entries were later withdrawn: "Më shiko drejt në sy" written by Andos Sinani and to have been performed by Andos Sinani, "Koha kalon" written by Besa Krasniqi and to have been performed by Besa Krasniqi and "Kënga jeta jonë" written by Enver Shëngjergji and Ylli Mestani and to have been performed by Kozma Dushi. "Kjo natë" performed by Estela Brahimllari was named as the only replacement entry.

Key: Withdrawn

Competing entries
Artist	Song	Songwriter(s)
Agim Poshka	"Në rrugën tonë"	Agim Poshka; Olsa Poshka
Altin Goci	"Rock për gjithë jetën"	Altin Goci; Klodi Shehu
Ana Gramo	"Në koma"	Genti Lako; Ida Nurçe
Andos Sinani (Note: Withdrawn.)	"Më shiko drejt në sy"	Andos Sinani
Grupi Aurora	"Maria"	Grupi Aurora
Besa Krasniqi	"Koha kalon"	Besa Krasniqi
Besiana Mehmeti and Shkodran Tolaj	"Kështjella"	Adrian Hila; Pandi Laço
Bojken Lako Band	"Të ndjej"	Bojken Lako Band
Elhaida Dani	"Diell"	Sokol Marsi; Aldo Shllaku; Viola Trebicka
Emi Bogdo	"Një femër"	Lambert Jorganxhi; Florian Zyka
Enver Petrovci	"Të vranë bukuri"	Enver Petrovci
Enxhi and Xhejn Kumrija	"Njeri"	Enxhi Kumrija; Xhejn Kumrija
Erga Halilaj	"Ti s'më njeh"	Ronela Hajati; Kristi Popa
Estela Brahimllari	"Kjo natë"	Edmond Veizaj
Florent Abrashi and Sigi Bastri	"Eklips mbi oqean"	Florent Abrashi; Sokol Marsi
Gjergj Leka	"Himn"	Zhuljana Jorganxhi; Gjergj Leka
Jozefina Simoni	"Mendje trazi"	Markeljan Kapedani; Bledar Sejko; Eda Sejko
Julian Gjojdeshi	"Himn jetës"	Fatos Arapi; Vasil S. Tole
Kelly	"Nëse ti do"	Kelly
Klajdi Musabelliu	"Vetëm te ti besoj"	Klajdi Musabelliu; Jorgo Papingji
Kozma Dushi	"Kënga jeta jonë"	Enver Shengjergji; Ylli Mestani
Lindita Halimi	"S'të fal"	Lindita Halimi; Zzap & Chriss
Marsela Çibukaj	"S'muj"	Olsa Toqi
Mjellma Berisha	"Sot jetoj"	Enis Mullaj
Grupi Offchestra	"Bajram"	Offchestra Band; Faruk Banjska
Revolt Klan	"Më mungon"	Bruno Pollogati; Febi Shkurti
Rezarta Smaja	"Më rrëmbe"	Dr. Flori; Klodian Qafoku
Saimir Braho	"Kristal"	Saimir Braho
Venera Lumani	"Dua të jetoj"	Endrit Shani; Gerald Xhari

==== Semi-finals ====
The two semi-finals of Festivali i Këngës took place on 26 December and 27 December 2014 and were broadcast at 20:45 (CET). In each semi-final, a total of 13 songs competed, of which nine entries selected by a jury advanced to the final.

Key: Qualifier

Semi-final 1 – 26 December 2014
R/O	Artist	Song
1	Enver Petrovci	"Të vranë bukuri"
2	Revolt Klan	"Më mungon"
3	Julian Gjojdeshi	"Himn jetës"
4	Florent Abrashi and Sigi Bastri	"Eklips mbi oqean"
5	Marsela Çibukaj	"S'muj"
6	Saimir Braho	"Kristal"
7	Klajdi Musabelliu	"Vetëm te ti besoj"
8	Erga Halilaj	"Ti s'më njeh"
9	Besiana Mehmeti and Shkodran Tolaj	"Kështjella"
10	Estela Brahimllari	"Kjo natë"
11	Lindita Halimi	"S'të fal"
12	Grupi Offchestra	"Bajram"
13	Venera Lumani	"Dua të jetoj"

Semi-final 2 – 27 December 2014
R/O	Artist	Song
1	Jozefina Simoni	"Mendje trazi"
2	Altin Goci	"Rock për gjithë jetën"
3	Bojken Lako Band	"Të ndjej"
4	Elhaida Dani	"Diell"
5	Kelly	"Nëse ti do"
6	Rezarta Smaja	"Më rrëmbe"
7	Grupi Aurora	"Maria"
8	Ana Gramo	"Në koma"
9	Mjellma Berisha	"Sot jetoj"
10	Emi Bogdo	"Një femër"
11	Agim Poshka	"Në rrugën tonë"
12	Enxhi and Xhejn Kumrija	"Njeri"
13	Gjergj Leka	"Himn"

==== Final ====
The final of Festivali i Këngës took place on 28 December 2014 and was broadcast at 20:45 (CET). The jury, consisting of Fatos Baxhaku, Genc Dashi, Agim Doçi, Alida Hisku, Rona Nishliu, Evi Reçi and David Tukiçi, determined Elhaida Dani as the winner of the contest for the song "Diell".

Key: Winner Second place Third place

Final – 28 December 2014
R/O	Artist(s)	Song	Results	
R/O	Artist(s)	Song	Points	Place
1	Besiana Mehmeti and Shkodran Tolaj	"Kështjella"	31	4
2	Bojken Lako Band	"Të ndjej"	62	2
3	Emi Bogdo	"Një femër"	18	10
4	Lindita Halimi	"S'të fal"	45	3
5	Mjellma Berisha	"Sot jetoj"	22	8
6	Enver Petrovci	"Të vranë bukuri"	12	12
7	Erga Halilaj	"Ti s'më njeh"	15	11
8	Rezarta Smaja	"Më rrëmbe"	23	7
9	Jozefina Simoni	"Mendje trazi"	12	12
10	Venera Lumani	"Dua të jetoj"	20	9
11	Altin Goci	"Rock për gjithë jetën"	9	14
12	Gjergj Leka	"Himn"	24	6
13	Klajdi Musabelliu	"Vetëm te ti besoj"	0	16
14	Saimir Braho	"Kristal"	3	15
15	Estela Brahimllari	"Kjo natë"	0	16
16	Marsela Çibukaj	"S'muj"	28	5
17	Agim Poshka	"Në rrugën tonë"	0	16
18	Elhaida Dani	"Diell"	82	1

=== Song replacement ===
On 23 February 2015, Dani announced the withdrawal of "Diell" in a social media statement, attributing the decision to one of its authors, Aldo Shllaku, who revoked permission for its usage. Martin Leka, the director of RTSH, explained that Shllaku declined to transfer the rights to the song to the broadcaster, citing his exclusion from subsequent involvement despite the song's success at Festivali i Këngës. This prompted Dani to reconfirm her agreement with the broadcaster to represent the country at the Eurovision Song Contest, though with a different song. Subsequently, on 24 February, it was revealed that Dani would perform "I'm Alive", a song composed at the contest in collaboration with Sokol Marsi and Albanian producers Zzap & Chriss.

=== Promotion ===
A music video for "I'm Alive" debuted on the official YouTube channel of the Eurovision Song Contest on 15 March 2015 at 20:30 (CET). As part of promotional efforts, both an Albanian-language rendition and an acoustic version were released on the same platform in May 2015. Preceding the scheduled live shows, Dani engaged in a tour between March and April. This included participation as one of 24 entries of 2015 in the Eurovision in Concert series in Amsterdam, Netherlands on 18 April, as well as performing at the London Eurovision Party.

== At Eurovision ==
The Eurovision Song Contest 2015 took place at Wiener Stadthalle in Vienna, Austria; it consisted of two semi-finals held on 19 and 21 May and the final on 23 May 2015. According to the Eurovision rules, all participating countries, apart from the host nation and the "Big Five", consisting of France, Germany, Italy, Spain and the United Kingdom, were required to qualify from one of the two semi-finals to compete for the final, with the top 10 countries from each semi-final progressing to the final. In the 2015 contest, Australia also competed directly in the final as an invited guest nation. The European Broadcasting Union (EBU) split up the competing countries into five different pots based on voting patterns from previous 10 years. On 26 January 2015, an allocation draw was held that placed each nation into one of the two semi-finals and determined which half of the show they would perform in. Therein, it was announced that Albania was scheduled to perform in the second half of the first semi-final of the contest.

Once all the competing songs for the 2015 contest had been released, the running order for the semi-finals was decided by the shows' producers rather than through another draw, so that similar songs were not placed next to each other. Albania was set to perform at position 14, succeeding Denmark and preceding Romania. All three shows were broadcast in Albania on TVSH, RTSH HD, RTSH Muzikë and Radio Tirana with commentary by Andri Xhahu.

=== Performances ===
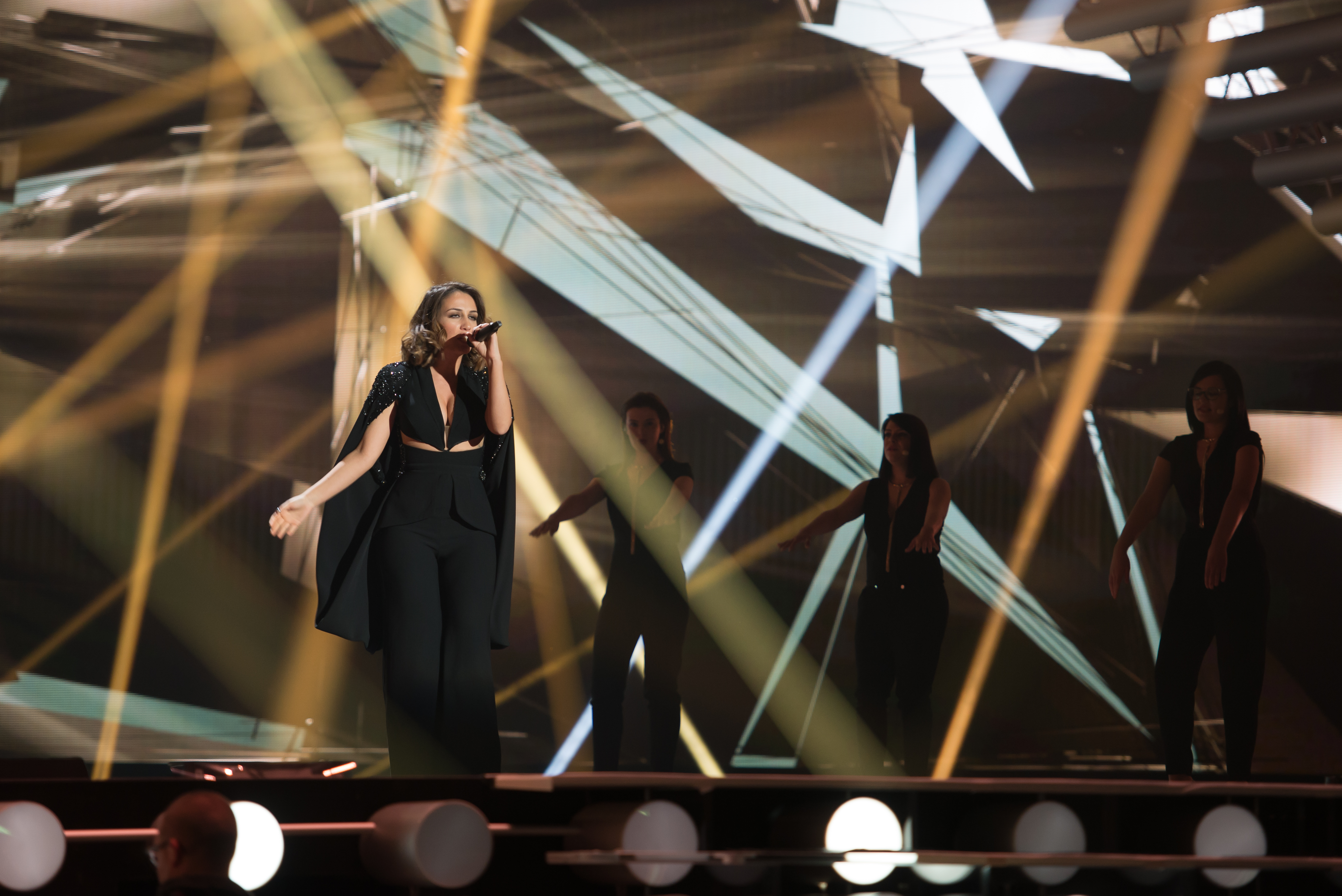
Elhaida Dani performing "I'm Alive" at a dress rehearsal for the first semi-final of the Eurovision Song Contest 2015.

Preceding the first semi-final, Dani participated in technical rehearsals held on 12 and 15 May, followed by dress rehearsals on 18 and 19 May. These also included the jury final, during which professional juries from each country, responsible for 50 percent of their respective votes, observed and evaluated the entries. The stage show featured Elhaida Dani dressed in a black costume with an attached cape that had embedded crystals. Dani delivered the song from the centre of the stage while three female backing vocalists were set to her side, dressed in black outfits. The stage lighting created a dark atmosphere with the background LED screens displaying moving rays and shapes in yellow and cream colours.

Albania's advancement to the final was announced after the semi-final show, with the country securing a place in the top ten. Immediately after the first semi-final, a winner's press conference convened for the ten countries that qualified, allowing their artists to participate in a draw determining their performance segment in the final. Albania was designated to compete in the second half. Following this draw, the show's producers, akin to their role in the semi-finals, arranged the running order for the final; Albania was positioned to perform in position 26, succeeding Russia and preceding Italy. At the 23 May final, the nation placed 17th out of the 27 finalists with 34 points.

=== Voting ===
Voting during the three live shows of the Eurovision Song Contest consisted of 50 percent public televoting and 50 percent from a jury deliberation. The jury consisted of five music industry professionals who were citizens of the country they represented, with their names published before the contest to ensure transparency. This jury was asked to judge each contestant based on vocal capacity, the stage performance, the song's composition and originality, and the overall impression of the act. In addition, no member of a national jury could be related in any way to any of the competing acts in such a way that they could not vote impartially and independently. After the final, the individual rankings of each jury member were released. During the first semi-final, Albania achieved the eighth place in the televote, with 66 points, and ninth place in the jury vote, with 61 points. In the final, Albania was ninth place in the televote, with 93 points, and 26th in the jury vote, with four points.

Below is a breakdown of points awarded to Albania and awarded by Albania in the first semi-final and final of the contest, and the breakdown of the jury voting and televoting conducted during the two shows:

==== Points awarded to Albania ====
Points awarded to Albania (Semi-final 1)
Score	Country
12 points	
10 points	Belgium; Greece; Macedonia
8 points	
7 points	France
6 points	Georgia; Moldova; Spain
5 points	
4 points	
3 points	Austria; Russia
2 points	
1 point	Hungary

Points awarded to Albania (Final)
Score	Country
12 points	Macedonia
10 points	Montenegro
8 points	
7 points	
6 points	Belgium; Greece
5 points	
4 points	
3 points	
2 points	
1 point	

==== Points awarded by Albania ====
Points awarded by Albania (Semi-final 1)
Score	Country
12 points	Greece
10 points	Macedonia
8 points	Romania
7 points	Russia
6 points	Belgium
5 points	Armenia
4 points	Georgia
3 points	Hungary
2 points	Moldova
1 point	Netherlands

Points awarded by Albania (Final)
Score	Country
12 points	Italy
10 points	Greece
8 points	Russia
7 points	Sweden
6 points	Montenegro
5 points	Israel
4 points	Estonia
3 points	Australia
2 points	Serbia
1 point	Belgium

==== Detailed voting results ====
The following members comprised the Albanian jury:

- Bojken Lako (jury chairperson)
- Klodian Qafoku
- Olsa Toqi
- Arta Marku
- Zhani Ciko

Detailed voting results from Albania (Semi-final 1)
R/O	Country	B. Lako	K. Qafoku	O. Toqi	A. Marku	Z. Ciko	Jury Rank	Televote Rank	Combined Rank	Points
01	Moldova	6	2	7	6	5	4	13	9	2
02	Armenia	7	15	9	3	1	7	8	6	5
03	Belgium	10	11	3	10	9	9	4	5	6
04	Netherlands	9	7	13	1	8	8	10	10	1
05	Finland	11	13	14	15	13	14	9	14	
06	Greece	4	1	5	7	3	2	1	1	12
07	Estonia	14	10	15	13	14	15	5	12	
08	Macedonia	3	3	2	5	4	1	7	2	10
09	Serbia	5	6	4	2	6	3	15	11	
10	Hungary	1	4	8	9	7	6	11	8	3
11	Belarus	15	12	6	11	12	12	14	15	
12	Russia	8	14	1	12	11	11	2	4	7
13	Denmark	12	8	11	4	10	10	12	13	
14	Albania									
15	Romania	2	5	10	8	2	5	6	3	8
16	Georgia	13	9	12	14	15	13	3	7	4

Detailed voting results from Albania (Final)
R/O	Country	B. Lako	K. Qafoku	O. Toqi	A. Marku	Z. Ciko	Jury Rank	Televote Rank	Combined Rank	Points
01	Slovenia	12	15	8	16	25	14	24	20	
02	France	17	22	16	10	11	15	19	17	
03	Israel	18	10	12	20	9	11	6	6	5
04	Estonia	11	12	10	12	21	10	8	7	4
05	United Kingdom	22	23	20	25	20	26	17	21	
06	Armenia	24	16	26	15	15	20	25	23	
07	Lithuania	23	17	25	17	17	23	23	24	
08	Serbia	7	5	7	4	3	6	14	9	2
09	Norway	13	24	14	18	14	17	21	19	
10	Sweden	5	8	5	3	1	5	5	4	7
11	Cyprus	25	25	24	21	12	25	22	25	
12	Australia	10	6	11	9	16	8	10	8	3
13	Belgium	19	14	9	13	18	12	9	10	1
14	Austria	14	26	13	24	22	22	15	18	
15	Greece	6	4	3	1	2	2	2	2	10
16	Montenegro	4	3	1	5	5	3	13	5	6
17	Germany	8	9	15	26	24	16	7	12	
18	Poland	26	19	19	19	19	24	20	22	
19	Latvia	2	18	6	7	13	7	16	13	
20	Romania	16	13	22	14	8	13	12	14	
21	Spain	20	7	17	22	23	19	11	16	
22	Hungary	15	11	18	8	7	9	18	15	
23	Georgia	9	20	21	11	26	18	4	11	
24	Azerbaijan	21	21	23	23	10	21	26	26	
25	Russia	3	2	4	6	6	4	3	3	8
26	Albania									
27	Italy	1	1	2	2	4	1	1	1	12
