= Sunčane Skale 2015 =

Dates
- Final: 29 June 2015

Host
- Venue: Kanli Tower, Herceg Novi, Montenegro
- Presenter(s): Ivan Maksimović, Dajana Pejović Golubović
- Director: Slobodan Bučevac
- Host broadcaster: Radio Television of Montenegro (RTCG)

Participants
- Number of entries: 22 songs from 6 countries
- Debuting countries: None
- Returning countries: Spain
- Non-returning countries: None

Vote
- Voting system: Several jury members voted for their 10 favourite songs awarding 1-8, 10 and 12 points.
- Winning song: Karin Soiref Sing my song

Sunčane Skale 2015 was the 21st and the final edition of Sunčane Skale, an annual pop festival held in Montenegro.

== Results ==
=== Nove zvijezde ===
| Draw | Singer | Song | Place | Points |
|---|---|---|---|---|
| 01 | Jelena Đurić | Dan | 7 | 37 |
| 02 | Aleksandar Stojanović | Ostani | 18 | 23 |
| 03 | 4 Feelings | Slučajno | 12 | 32 |
| 04 | Mirjana Kalabić | Ne krivi me | 21 | 16 |
| 05 | Alexander Dimmi | Ubij me | 22 | 8 |
| 06 | Marko Vukeš Vuky | Noću brojim uzdahe | 16 | 24 |
| 07 | Pajtosi | Hit pesma | 17 | 24 |
| 08 | Neva Edi | Ljubavna | 15 | 27 |
| 09 | Visar Redjepi | Zemer (Srce) | 19 | 18 |
| 10 | Damir Kovačić | Druže moj | 6 | 38 |
| 11 | Adastra | Gorim u sebi | 10 | 33 |
| 12 | Maria Masle | Mi hombre (Baby baby) | 8 | 36 |
| 13 | Luka Radović | Kameleon | 20 | 18 |
| 14 | Fran | Ljeto dvaput godišnje | 15 | 27 |
| 15 | Samir Ramović | Ljubavi nove | 5 | 52 |
| 16 | Monika Knezović | Naš svijet | 4 | 60 |
| 17 | Highway | Bar na kratko | 3 | 65 |
| 18 | Danica Krstić | Suze za kraj | 2 | 81 |
| 19 | Karin Soiref | Sing my song | 1 | 93 |
| 20 | Bojan Jovović & Eva Papović | Oprostiću ti sve | 9 | 36 |
| 21 | Rajo Simonović | Prokleto muško | 13 | 31 |
| 22 | Pirati | Opasne vibracije | 11 | 33 |

== Scoreboard ==
For the first time, there was a Facebook online voting. The song that got most Likes got 12 points.

| | Results | | | | | | | | | | | | | | |
| | Points | FB | (Bosnia and Herzegovina) | (Montenegro) | (North Macedonia) | (Montenegro) | (Spain) | (North Macedonia) | (Slovenia) | (Serbia) | (Azerbaijan) | (Serbia) | (United States) | (Croatia) | (Montenegro) |
| Jelena Đurić | 37 | 5 | 1 | | | | 6 | 7 | | | 6 | 8 | 4 | | |
| Aleksandar Stojanović | 23 | | | | 4 | | | | 12 | 1 | 5 | | | | 1 |
| 4 Feelings | 32 | 2 | | | 10 | 6 | | 8 | | 6 | | | | | |
| Mirjana Kalabić | 16 | 1 | | | | | | | 5 | 3 | 2 | 5 | | | |
| Alexander Dimmi | 8 | | | | | | | | | 8 | | | | | |
| Marko Vukeš Vuky | 24 | | | 6 | 3 | | | | | | | | 8 | 2 | 5 |
| Pajtosi | 24 | | | 5 | | 1 | | | 1 | 5 | | 10 | | | 2 |
| Neva Edi | 27 | 6 | | 7 | 1 | | | 3 | | | | 7 | | 3 | |
| Visar Redjepi | 18 | 10 | | | 8 | | | | | | | | | | |
| Damir Kovačić | 38 | | 2 | 2 | | | 4 | 10 | 6 | | | 4 | | 10 | |
| Adastra | 33 | | | 1 | 7 | | | | | | 1 | 6 | | 12 | 6 |
| Maria Masle | 36 | | 5 | 4 | | | 2 | | 7 | 4 | 7 | 3 | | | 4 |
| Luka Radović | 18 | 4 | 6 | | | 2 | | | 3 | | | | 3 | | |
| Fran | 27 | 12 | | | | | 3 | 4 | | | 3 | | 5 | | |
| Samir Ramović | 52 | | 10 | 8 | 2 | 8 | 10 | | | 10 | | 1 | 2 | 1 | |
| Monika Knezović | 60 | | 8 | | | 12 | 5 | 2 | 4 | | 8 | 2 | 7 | 4 | 8 |
| Highway Trio | 65 | 8 | | 10 | | 4 | 8 | 5 | | | 4 | | 6 | 8 | 12 |
| Danica Krstić | 81 | 3 | 7 | | | 7 | | 6 | 8 | 12 | 12 | 12 | | 7 | 7 |
| Karin Soiref | 93 | 7 | 12 | 12 | 12 | | 12 | 12 | | | 10 | | 10 | 6 | |
| Bojan Jovović & Eva Papović | 36 | | 4 | | | 3 | 7 | | | 7 | | | | 5 | 10 |
| Rajo Simonović | 31 | | 3 | 3 | 6 | 5 | | | 2 | | | | 12 | | |
| Pirati | 33 | | | | 5 | 10 | 1 | 1 | 10 | 2 | | | 1 | | 3 |

Jury members:

- Facebook voting - Boris Milivojević
- (Bosnia and Herzegovina) - ?
- (Montenegro) - ?
- (North Macedonia) - Aleksandar Belov
- (Montenegro) - Bojan Delić
- (Spain) - ?
- (North Macedonia) - Elena Petreska
- (Slovenia) - ?
- (Serbia) - Saša Mirković
- (Azerbaijan) - Isa Melikov
- (Serbia) - Dušica Jakovljević
- (United States) - ?
- (Croatia) - Vanna
- (Montenegro) - Anita Popović
