= Seyran =

Seyran is a given name of Arabic origin that means "travel". Notable people with the name include:

- Seyran Ates (born 1963), German lawyer
- Seyran Ohanyan (born 1962), Armenian general
- Seyran Osipov (1961–2008), Russian footballer
- Seyran Papo (born 1988), German politician
- Seyran Saroyan (1967–2022), Armenian general and politician
- Seyran Shahsuvaryan (born 1953), Armenian general
- Seyran Aksoy, Turkish actress
- Seyran Öztürk, Turkish actress
