= Petar Bošković =

Serb diplomat (1931–2011)

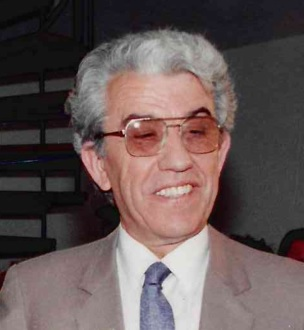
- Born: 9 July 1931; Brčeli, Yugoslavia
- Died: 14 January 2011 (aged 79); Belgrade, Serbia
- Occupation: diplomat
- Spouse: Branislava Lazarević Bošković
- Children: Dobrivoje, Milo and Slobodan

Petar Bošković (9 July 1931 – 14 January 2011) was a Yugoslav and Serbian diplomat. He was an ambassador of the Socialist Federal Republic of Yugoslavia to the Republic of Cyprus.

== Life and work ==
=== Distinguished brothers Bošković ===
Petar Bošković was born on July 9, 1931, in the Montenegrin village of Brčeli situated near the coastal city and port of Bar. His father Ivo worked in the United States.Petar remained with his mother and brothers in Yugoslavia. Petar's brother Đuro Bošković (1914–1945) was a lawyer, a revolutionary, a participant in the National Liberation struggle and a member of (OZNA) the security agency of Yugoslavia that existed between 1944 and 1952. Đuro became particularly prominent during the World War II battle of Sutjeska when he reported to the military commanding staff that even though they lost two-thirds of the fighters, they could count on them as being in full force. Petar's brother national hero Milo Bošković (1911–1944) was killed in 1944 in the Jasenovac concentration camp. Their sister Velika was a fighter in the Yugoslav Partisans movement engaged with the Fourth Proletarian Montenegrin task force brigade. Petar's wife Branislava Boškovic was the grandchild of Ilija Krpić, who was a priest and one of the founders of the Serbian Cultural and Educational Society Prosveta.

=== Diplomat ===
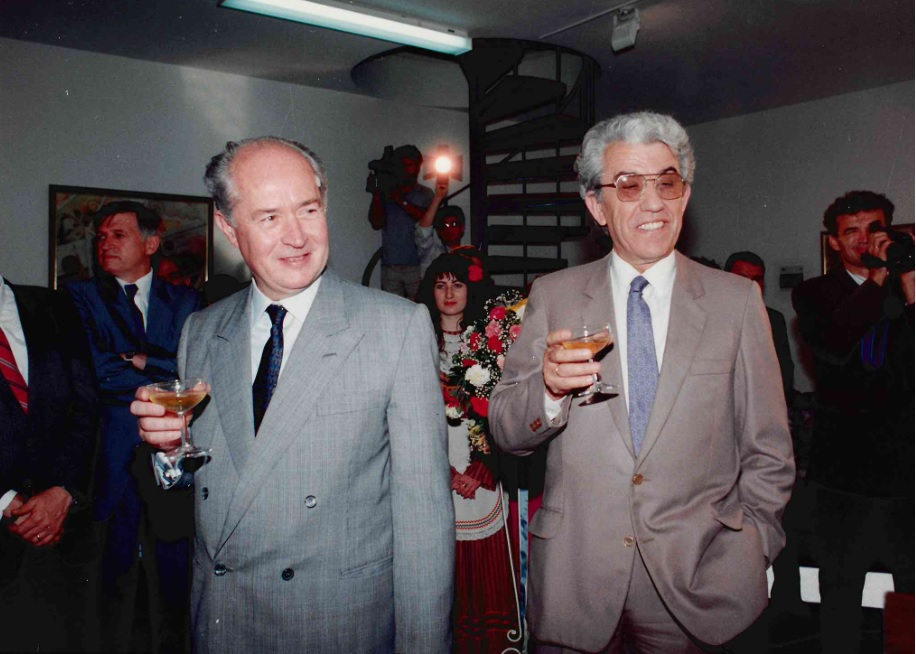
President of Cyprus George Vassiliou and ambassador Petar Bošković in 1990

Later 1952, as a young man Petar joined his father Ivo in the United States. He graduated from the Faculty of Political Science at the Carlisle Dickinson College in Pennsylvania. He completed his master's degree in political sciences in 1973, at the Belgrade Faculty of Political Science, University of Belgrade.

From 1960 until 1965 he worked in the Ministry of Foreign Affairs of the Federal People's Republic of Yugoslavia. Between 1965 and 1976 he was appointed for three consecutive terms as the first executive director of the Fulbright Commission for scholarships for postgraduate studies in Belgrade, Yugoslavia. The Fulbright treaty signed between the US and Yugoslavia at the end of 1964 for the exchange of Fulbright scholars and professors was the first such agreed with a Communist country.

From 1976 to 1980 he served as a First Counselor at the Embassy of Yugoslavia in London. After his return from London, he worked as the head of the department for Western Europe and USA within the Central Committee of the ruling League of Communists of Yugoslavia (LCY) party. He was engaged several times within the Central Committee of the ruling LCY party, although he was never a member of the League of Communists of Yugoslavia. From 1982 until the end of 1984 he served as director and chief editor of the daily Montenegrin newspaper “Pobjeda”. Then from 1985 to 1988 he served as a foreign policy advisor to the Central Committee of the LCY.

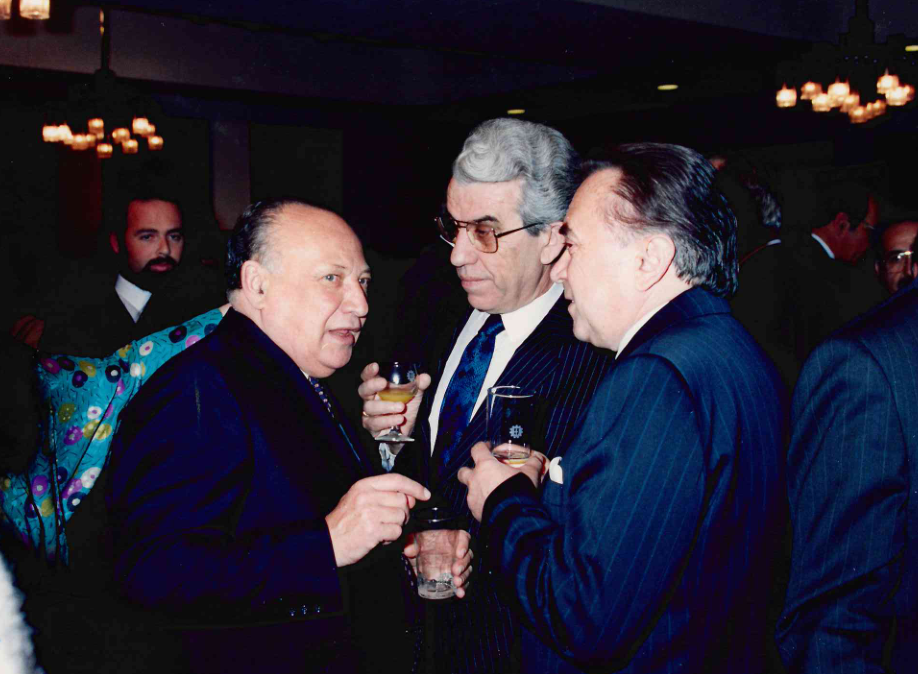
Glafcos Clerides President of Cyprus(1993–2003), Petar Bošković and ambassador of Czechoslovakia

=== Ambassador in Cyprus ===
In 1988 he was appointed as the ambassador of Yugoslavia to the Republic of Cyprus. He held this post until 1993. As ambassador, he emphasized Yugoslavia's position of non-acceptance of unilateral secession in Cyprus, as well as full support for the sovereignty and territorial integrity of the Republic of Cyprus.

At the end of 1993 and in 1994 he held a series of lectures at the American universities Bradley, Dickinson, Lafayette, Lebanon Valley, Colgate, Penn State, and Beavers College where, among others, he tried to point out to the public America's one-sided approach towards the Yugoslavian conflict. In 1999 he was invited once more by American universities as a foreign policy expert to lecture on Serbian-Albanian relations.

He was a Senior Fellow of the Institute for Strategic Studies and Development in Belgrade.

He is included among the 100 most notable alumni of Dickinson University.

In 1999, he was one of the most important witnesses in the trial of the Ustasha World War II criminal Dinko Šakić. He witnessed how Dinko Šakić killed his brother Milo Bošković in Jasenovac concentration camp. He died on January 14, 2011, in Belgrade.

== Works ==
He was a contributor to many newspapers and magazines in Yugoslavia and abroad. In addition to numerous articles published during his career, two books are of particular importance:

- Recent developments in the Western European Left, Belgrade, 1982
- The challenges of technological change, Belgrade 1987

== Literature ==
- Odlazak Petra Boškovića, Pobjeda, 16. 1.2011
- The Morning Call
- Petar Bošković, svedok na suđenju Dinku Šakiću
- Petar Boskovic, Expert On Serbian Foreign Affairs To Discuss Kosovo At Colgate
- The War Diaries of Vladimir Dedijer, Volume 2:From November 28, 1942, to September 10, 1943, University of Michigan Press, Ann Arbor, May 1, 1990
