= One Night's Anger =

2014 song by Hersi Matmuja

Single by Hersi Matmuja
- Released: 11 April 2014
- Genre: Arena rock, symphonic rock, power ballad
- Length: 3:04
- Label: CMC; Universal
- Composer: Genti Lako
- Lyricist: Jorgo Papingji

Hersi Matmuja singles chronology
"Kush ta dha këtë emër?" (2012)	"One Night's Anger" (2014)

Music video
- "One Night's Anger" on YouTube

Eurovision Song Contest 2014 entry
- Country: Albania
- Artist: Hersi Matmuja
- Language: English
- Composer: Genti Lako
- Lyricist: Jorgo Papingji

Finals performance
- Semi-final result: 15th
- Semi-final points: 22

Entry chronology
- ◄ "Identitet" (2013)
- "I'm Alive" (2015) ►

Song presentation
- file; help

Official performance video
- "One Night's Anger" (Semi-1) on YouTube

"One Night's Anger" is a song by Albanian singer Hersi Matmuja. The track was first released as part of a CD compilation on 11 April 2014 by CMC Records and Universal Music. The English-language rock song was written by Jorgo Papingji and composed by Gentian Lako. An accompanying music video was uploaded on the official YouTube channel of the Eurovision Song Contest on 16 March 2014. The song received mixed reviews from music critics, some of whom praised the singer's vocals, while others described it as a "work-in-progress".

The song represented Albania in the Eurovision Song Contest 2014 in Copenhagen, Denmark, after Matmuja won the country's pre-selection competition Festivali i Këngës with the Albanian-language version "Zemërimi i nje natë". It failed to qualify for the grand final in fifteenth place marking the country's fifth non-qualification in the contest. During her minimalistic performance, she was performing against a slightly dark-themed LED screen whose colors were predominantly blue and white.

== Background and composition ==
In 2013, Hersi Matmuja was announced as one of the contestants selected to compete in the 52nd edition of Festivali i Këngës, a competition to determine Albania's entrant for the Eurovision Song Contest 2014. As part from the competition's rules, the lyrics of the participating entries had to be in the Albanian language. The singer took part with the Albanian-language song "Zemërimi i nje natë" composed by Genti Lako and written by Jorgo Papingji. For the purpose of the singer's Eurovision Song Contest participation, the song was remastered and translated to "One Night's Anger". Musically, it is an English-language pop song. Hersi stated in an interview that the song is about the dangers of letting anger guide one's decisions, and the importance of thinking before reacting.

== Critical reception ==
Upon its victory at Festivali i Këngës, the song received mixed reviews from music critics. In a Wiwibloggs review containing several reviews from individual critics, they criticised the song's English-language version, but praised the singer's vocals and the song's lyrical content. Contributing writers for ESC Tips gave the song a rating of three stars out of five, describing the song as a "work-in-progress" and suggested that at the present time it would be "difficult to predict Albania's course in the contest". They went on to say that the instrumentation would need to be altered to juxtapose verses and chorus "[...] for those elements to provide clear separation and add layers to the song".

== Promotion and release ==
An accompanying music video for the song premiered on the official YouTube channel of the Eurovision Song Contest on 16 March 2014. For further promotion, she appeared to perform the song at various radio and television shows in April 2014, including in Hungary, Montenegro, the Netherlands and San Marino. The song was initially issued on 11 April 2014 as part of the Eurovision Song Contest: Copenhagen 2014 compilation album on CD by CMC Records and Universal Music. On 14 February 2018, it was released as a standalone download through Radio Televizioni Shqiptar (RTSH).

== At Eurovision ==
=== Festivali i Këngës ===
The national broadcaster of Albania, Radio Televizioni Shqiptar (RTSH), organised the 52nd edition of Festivali i Këngës to determine the country's participant for the Eurovision Song Contest 2014 in Copenhagen, Denmark. It consisted of two semi-finals on 26 and 27 December, and the grand final on 28 December 2013, in which, Hersi Matmuja was chosen to represent the country in the contest, after the votes of an expert jury were combined, resulting in 69 points.

=== Copenhagen ===
The 59th edition of the Eurovision Song Contest took place in Copenhagen, Denmark, and consisted of two semi-finals held on 6 and 8 May, and the grand final on 10 May 2014. According to the Eurovision rules, each participating country, except the host country and the "Big Five", consisting of France, Germany, Italy, Spain and the United Kingdom, were required to qualify from one of the two semi-finals to compete for the grand final, although, the top ten countries from the respective semi-final progress to the grand final. On 20 January 2014, it was announced that Albania would be performing in the first half of the first semi-final of the contest. During the live show, Albania performed sixth, following Iceland and preceding Russia. The country eventually failed to qualify for the grand final in fifteenth place with 22 points, ranking ninth by the jury's 64 points and fifteenth by the televote of 6 points.

Matmuja's minimalistic performance commences with a rear view of her looking out across the arena standing on a podium. She wore an ivory-coloured full-length dress created by Kosovo-Albanian designer Blerina Kllokoqi Rugova, and was accompanied by three backing vocalists and a drum player, who were further hired for the show placed on the stage floor. On stage, Matmuja performed against a slightly dark LED screen whose colors were predominantly blue and white.

== Track listing ==
- Digital download
1. "Zemërimi i një nate (Festivali i Këngës)" – 3:36

== Release history ==
Region	Date	Format	Label	Ref.
Various	11 April 2014	CD	CMC; Universal	
Various	14 February 2018	Digital download	Broken AL; RTSH	
