= Sunčane Skale =

Music festival in Montenegro

Sunčane Skale was a pop music festival held every summer in Herceg Novi, Montenegro. The festival began in 1994. The festival was held every year from 1994 to 2015, except in 1999 - NATO bombing of Yugoslavia. In 2016, it was cancelled for financial reasons.

== The festival ==
The festival lasts for three days. On the first day, the Prinčeva nagrada (Prince's award) is given to singers who won a nomination in a certain category. On day two the festival introduces new talent into the world; it's also called Nove zvijezde (New stars). On the final day singers sing a song and if it wins, it becomes the song of the summer (Pjesma ljeta).

== Winners ==
This is a list of the winners of Sunčane Skale day three: Pjesma ljeta

- 1994 - Maja Nikolić - "Baš sam se zaljubila"
- 1995 - Filip Žmaher
- 1996 - Leontina Vukomanović - "Jedna od sto"
- 1997 - Zorana Pavić - "Hoću da umrem dok me voliš"
- 1998 - Vlado Georgiev - Ako ikad ostarim
- 2000 - Tifa and Makadam - "Evo ima godina"
- 2001 - Ivana Banfić - "Sad je kasno"
- 2002 - Tijana Dapčević - "Negativ"
- 2003 - Bojan Marović - "Tebi je lako"
- 2004 - Romana Panić - "Nikad i zauvijek"
- 2005 - Goran Karan - "Ružo moja bila"
- 2006 - Milena Vučić - "Da l' ona zna" (Winner of Nove zvijezde)
- 2007 - Lejla Hot - "Suza stihova" (Winner of Nove zvijezde)
- 2008 - Aleksandra Bučevac - "Ostani"
- 2009 - Kaliopi and Naum Petreski - "Rum dum dum"
- 2010 - Dado Topić and Anita Popović - "Govore mojim glasom anđeli"
- 2011 - Qpid - "Under the radar"
- 2012 - J-DA - "Gel gel"
- 2013 - Teška industrija and Kemal Monteno - Majske kiše
- 2014 - Dimitar Andonovski - "Ako me boli" (only Nove zvijezde)
- 2015 - Karin Soiref - "Sing my song" (only Nove zvijezde)

== See also ==
- Montenegrin music festivals
