= Serebro discography =

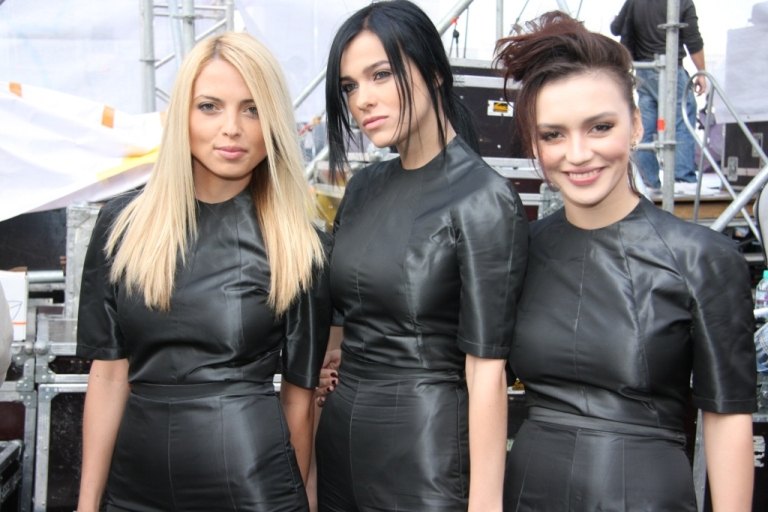
- Serebro's second line-up in 2010
- Studio albums: 3
- Extended plays: 2
- Compilation albums: 1
- Singles: 35
- Music videos: 43

Russian girl group Serebro have released a total of three studio albums, two EPs and 35 singles. Their debut single, "Song #1" reached number 99 in the UK, 68 in Switzerland, 35 in Sweden and 72 in Denmark and became their most commercially successful single. Their next single, "Дыши", was released in 2007. It reached number 2 in Russia, making it their first single to chart there. The band's next single "Опиум", which was known as a comeback single, peaking at 1 in Russia, 2 in Moscow, 5 in Latvia and 35 in Ukraine. It became their second number, but through references, it is currently their first. The band's fourth single "Скажи, не молчи" became the band's second number 1, but had less success, becoming one of the band's most unsuccessful singles to date, but with good commercial success. While their last single, it became member Marina Lizorkina last single when she left the band. The band released their debut album ОпиумRoz, released on 25 April 2009 in Russia and 2 March 2010 elsewhere. It was released by Monolit Records and Symbolic Records. Although it did not chart in any major charts, it had success threw online.

After the album was released, the band had announced a line-up change and replaced Lizorkina with new and current member Anastasia Karpova. On 24 August 2009, the band had released their fifth single "Сладко". It became successful in Russia, peaking at number 1 in Russia, and 5 in Latvia. It was marked as another comeback single. After the release, the band's first EP Избранное, released in September 2009.

In April 2010, the band released their sixth single Не Время, which was the band's most recognisable single to date, peaking at number 6 in Russia, the band's first single to peak outside the top 5. The English version was released on September. The band's single, Давай держаться за руки was successful in their native Russia, peaking at 3 in Russia, 18 in Ukraine and 7 in Latvia. However, it was the group's single "Mama Lover", which received media attention around Europe, and peaked outside off the Russian Federation, charting in countries including Spain, Czech Republic and Italy. It reached over 20 million views on YouTube, and is known as the group's most successful single to date. Mama Lover, the group's second studio album was released on 19 June 2012.

Сила трёх (English: Power of Three) is the third and final studio album of Russian girl group Serebro. It was released 27 May 2016 by Moonlit Records in Russia. Songs from the album, "Malo Tebya" and "Ya Tebya Ne Otdam" have become hits and were able to reach the top 5 main chart Tophit, and the track "Mi Mi Mi" became sensational in the world music market. The album also included a joint single "Ugar" with Russian musician, DJ M.E.G., as well as the collab "Blood Diamond", with the Dutch EDM production team Yellow Claw, previously included on their debut album, Blood for Mercy.

On 20 December 2024, Serebro released the EP titled LUML (an Abbreviation of "Let Us Make Love"). The EP included remixed versions of the group's past singles and different versions of their latesst single titled Song #2.

== Studio albums ==
Title	Details	Certifications
ОпиумRoz	Released: 25 April 2009 (Russia) 2 March 2010 (various); Label: Monolit Symbolic; Formats: CD, digital download	
Mama Lover	Released: 26 June 2012 19 June 2012 (various); Label: Monolit, Sony Music; Formats: CD, digital download	RUS: 2× Platinum; ITA: Platinum
Sila tryokh	Released: 27 May 2016; Label: Monolit; Format: Digital download	
11	Released: 19 July 2024; Label: MALFA; Format: Digital download	

== EPs ==
Title	Details
Избранное	Released: 2 March 2010; Label: Monolit, Symbolic; Format: Digital download
LUML	Released: 20 December 2024; Label: MALFA; Format: Digital download

== Singles ==
Title	Year	Chart positions											Certifications	Album
Title	Year	RUS	US Club	UK	SWE	CHE	UKR	DNK	BE	SPA	ITA	NLD	Certifications	Album
"Song #1"	2007	1	—	99	35	68	—	72	—	—	—	—		ОпиумRoz
"Дыши"	2007	2	—	—	—	—	—	—	—	—	—	—		ОпиумRoz
"Опиум"	2008	1	—	—	—	—	25	—	—	—	—	—		ОпиумRoz
"Скажи, не молчи"	2008	1	—	—	—	—	5	—	—	—	—	—		ОпиумRoz
"Like Mary Warner"	2009	1	—	—	—	—	7	—	—	—	—	—		Избранное & 11
"Не Время"	2010	6	—	—	—	—	129	—	—	—	—	—		Mama Lover
"Давай держаться за руки"	2010	3	—	—	—	—	7	—	—	—	—	—		Mama Lover
"Mama Lover"	2011	8	38	—	—	—	6	—	48	25	6	—	ITA: Platinum	Mama Lover
"Gun"	2012	124	66	—	—	—	46	—	—	—	23	—		Mama Lover
"Sexy Ass"	2013	—	—	—	—	—	—	—	—	—	—	—		Сила трёх
"Мало тебя"	2013	5	—	—	—	—	2	—	—	—	—	—		Сила трёх
"Mi Mi Mi"	2013	—	39	—	—	—	—	—	23	—	11	8	ITA: Platinum; NLD: Gold	Сила трёх
"Я тебя не отдам"	2014	1	—	—	—	—	3	—	—	—	—	—		Сила трёх
"Не надо больнее"	2014	81	—	—	—	—	77	—	—	—	—	—		Сила трёх
"Kiss"	2015	14	—	—	—	—	54	—	—	—	14	—		Сила трёх
"Перепутала"	2015	18	—	—	—	—	17	—	—	—	—	—		Сила трёх
"Отпусти меня"	2015	47	—	—	—	—	45	—	—	—	—	—		Сила трёх
"Chocolate"	2016	58	—	—	—	—	140	—	—	—	—	—		Сила трёх
"Сломана"	2016	10	—	—	—	—	35	—	—	—	—	—		11
"My Money (Radio Edit)"	2016	—	—	—	—	—	193	—	—	—	33	—		Сила трёх
"Пройдёт"	2017	69	—	—	—	—	—	—	—	—	—	—		11
"Между нами любовь"	2017	6	—	—	—	—	30	—	—	—	—	—		11
"Young Yummy Love" (with DJ Feel)	2017	—	—	—	—	—	—	—	—	—	—	—		11
"В Космосе"	2017	49	—	—	—	—	—	—	—	—	—	—		11
"Новый год"	2018	—	—	—	—	—	—	—	—	—	—	—		11
"111307"	2018	130	—	—	—	—	—	—	—	—	—	—		11
"Chico Loco"	2018	—	—	—	—	—	—	—	—	—	—	—		11
"Притяженья больше нет" (with Maxim Fadeev)	2018	136	—	—	—	—	—	—	—	—	—	—		11
"Пятница"	2018	195	—	—	—	—	—	—	—	—	—	—		11
"O, Mama"	2019	126	—	—	—	—	—	—	—	—	—	—		11
"Song #2"	2024	—	—	—	—	—	—	—	—	—	—	—		non-album singles
"Надоело (105)"	2025	87	—	—	—	—	—	—	—	—	—	—		non-album singles
"Надоело (105) [Предел]"	2025	—	—	—	—	—	—	—	—	—	—	—		non-album singles
"Дай мне шанс"	2025	—	—	—	—	—	—	—	—	—	—	—		non-album singles
"Звезды палят"	2025	—	—	—	—	—	—	—	—	—	—	—		non-album singles
"Снег идет"	2025	—	—	—	—	—	—	—	—	—	—	—		non-album singles
"Кто я для тебя"	2026	126	—	—	—	—	—	—	—	—	—	—		non-album singles
"Мало огня"	2026	91	—	—	—	—	—	—	—	—	—	—		non-album singles
"Смотри, но не трогай"	2026	—	—	—	—	—	—	—	—	—	—	—		non-album singles
Выключил лето	2026	—	—	—	—	—	—	—	—	—	—	—		non-album singles

== Music videos ==
- 2007: "Song #1" (Eurovision preview version)
- 2007: "Song #1" (Full length clip)
- 2007: "Песня #1" (Song #1)
- 2007: "Дыши" (Breathe)
- 2008: "Опиум" (Opium)
- 2008: "Опиум" (Rose version)
- 2008: "Скажи, не молчи" (Tell me, not quietly)
- 2009: "Сладко" (Sweet)
- 2010: "Не Время" (No time)
- 2011: "Давай держаться за руки" (Hold my hands)
- 2011: "Давай держаться за руки (Dubstep Version)"
- 2011: "Mama Lover"
- 2011: "Мама Люба" (Mama lover)
- 2011: "Мальчик (Promo Video)"
- 2012: "Мальчик" (Boy)
- 2013: "Angel Kiss (Dubstep Version)"
- 2013: "Sexy Ass"
- 2013: "Мало тебя" (Little of you)
- 2013: "Mi Mi Mi"
- 2013: "УГАР" (DJ M.E.G. feat. Serebro) (Waste)
- 2014: "Я тебя не отдам" (I won't give you up)
- 2014: "Я тебя не отдам (Emo Version)"
- 2015: "Kiss" - 3:44
- 2015: "Перепутала" (Confused)
- 2016: "Отпусти меня" (Let me go)
- 2016: "Отпусти меня (МУЗ-ТВ version)"
- 2016: "Chocolate"
- 2016: "Chocolate (Matvey Emerson Fitness Remix)"
- 2016 : "Сломана" (Broken)
- 2016 : "My Money"
- 2017 : "Пройдет (Mood Video)" (Passing)
- 2017 : "Между нами любовь (Summer Fun Video)"
- 2017 : "Между нами любовь" (Between us is love)
- 2017 : "В космосе" (In space)
- 2018 : "Новый год" (New year)
- 2018 : "Chico Loco"
- 2018 : "Притяженья больше нет" (No more attraction) (with Maxim Fadeev)
- 2018 : "Пятница" (Friday)
- 2019 : "О, мама" (Oh, mama)
- 2024 : "Song #2"
- 2025 : "Надоело" (105) (Tired (105))
- 2025 : "Надоело" (105) [Предел] (Tired (105) Limit)
- 2025 : “Дай мне шанс (Give me a chance)”
- 2025 : “Крылатые качели” (Winged Swing)
- 2025: “Звезды палят” (The Stars are Burning)
- 2025: “Снег идёт” (The snow is falling)
- 2026: “Кто я для тебя” (Who am I to you)
- 2026: “Мало огня” (Little fire)

Year	Song name	Director	Lineup
2007	«Song #1»/«Песня № 1»	Максим Фадеев, Максим Рожков / Maxim Fadeev, Maxim Rozhkov	Елена Темникова, Ольга Серябкина, Марина Лизоркина / Elena Temnikova, Olga Seryabkina, Marina Lizorkina
2007	«Дыши»	Максим Фадеев, Максим Рожков / Maxim Fadeev, Maxim Rozhkov	Елена Темникова, Ольга Серябкина, Марина Лизоркина / Elena Temnikova, Olga Seryabkina, Marina Lizorkina
2008	«Опиум»	Максим Фадеев / Maxim Fadeev	Елена Темникова, Ольга Серябкина, Марина Лизоркина / Elena Temnikova, Olga Seryabkina, Marina Lizorkina
2008	«Скажи, не молчи»	Максим Фадеев / Maxim Fadeev	Елена Темникова, Ольга Серябкина, Марина Лизоркина / Elena Temnikova, Olga Seryabkina, Marina Lizorkina
2009	«Сладко»	Максим Фадеев / Maxim Fadeev	Елена Темникова, Ольга Серябкина, Анастасия Карпова / Elena Temnikova, Olga Seryabkina, Anastasia Karpova
2010	«Не время»	Максим Фадеев / Maxim Fadeev	Елена Темникова, Ольга Серябкина, Анастасия Карпова / Elena Temnikova, Olga Seryabkina, Anastasia Karpova
2011	«Давай держаться за руки»	Юрий Курохтин / Yurii Kurokhtin	Елена Темникова, Ольга Серябкина, Анастасия Карпова / Elena Temnikova, Olga Seryabkina, Anastasia Karpova
2011	«Mama Lover»/«Мама Люба»	Максим Фадеев, Павел Колобаев / Maxim Fadeev, Pavel Kolobaev	Елена Темникова, Ольга Серябкина, Анастасия Карпова / Elena Temnikova, Olga Seryabkina, Anastasia Karpova
2012	«Мальчик»	Максим Фадеев, Павел Колобаев / Maxim Fadeev, Pavel Kolobaev	Елена Темникова, Ольга Серябкина, Анастасия Карпова / Elena Temnikova, Olga Seryabkina, Anastasia Karpova
2012	«Gun»	Максим Фадеев, Павел Колобаев / Maxim Fadeev, Pavel Kolobaev	Елена Темникова, Ольга Серябкина, Анастасия Карпова / Elena Temnikova, Olga Seryabkina, Anastasia Karpova
2013	«Mi Mi Mi»	Максим Фадеев / Maxim Fadeev	Елена Темникова, Ольга Серябкина, Анастасия Карпова / Elena Temnikova, Olga Seryabkina, Anastasia Karpova
2013	«Мало тебя»	Игорь Шмелёв / Igor Shmelyov	Елена Темникова, Ольга Серябкина, Анастасия Карпова / Elena Temnikova, Olga Seryabkina, Anastasia Karpova
2013	«Угар» (DJ M.E.G при участии Serebro)	Руслан Пелых / Ruslan Pelykh	Елена Темникова, Ольга Серябкина, Дарья Шашина / Elena Temnikova, Olga Seryabkina, Daria Shashina
2014	«Я тебя не отдам»	Игорь Шмелёв / Igor Shmelyov	Елена Темникова, Ольга Серябкина, Дарья Шашина / Elena Temnikova, Olga Seryabkina, Daria Shashina
2015	«Kiss»	Станислав Морозов / Stanislav Morozov	Ольга Серябкина, Дарья Шашина, Полина Фаворская / Olga Seryabkina, Daria Shashina, Polina Favorskaya
2015	«Перепутала»	Станислав Морозов / Stanislav Morozov	Ольга Серябкина, Дарья Шашина, Полина Фаворская / Olga Seryabkina, Daria Shashina, Polina Favorskaya
2016	«Отпусти меня»	Ирма Польских / Irma Polskikh	Ольга Серябкина, Дарья Шашина, Полина Фаворская / Olga Seryabkina, Daria Shashina, Polina Favorskaya
2016	«Chocolate»	Ирма Польских / Irma Polskikh	Ольга Серябкина, Полина Фаворская, Екатерина Кищук / Olga Seryabkina, Polina Favorskaya, Ekaterina Kishchuk
2016	«Сломана»	Ирма Польских / Irma Polskikh	Ольга Серябкина, Полина Фаворская, Екатерина Кищук / Olga Seryabkina, Polina Favorskaya, Ekaterina Kishchuk
2016	«My money»	Максим Фадеев / Maxim Fadeev	Ольга Серябкина, Полина Фаворская, Екатерина Кищук / Olga Seryabkina, Polina Favorskaya, Ekaterina Kishchuk
2017	«Между нами любовь»	Максим Фадеев / Maxim Fadeev	Ольга Серябкина, Полина Фаворская, Екатерина Кищук / Olga Seryabkina, Polina Favorskaya, Ekaterina Kishchuk
2017	«В космосе»	Дилия Альшина, Стася Венкова / Diliya Alshina, Stasya Venkova	Ольга Серябкина, Полина Фаворская, Екатерина Кищук / Olga Seryabkina, Polina Favorskaya, Ekaterina Kishchuk
2017	«Новый год»	Дмитрий Фадеев / Dmitrii Fadeev	Ольга Серябкина, Полина Фаворская, Екатерина Кищук, Татьяна Моргунова / Olga Seryabkina, Polina Favorskaya, Ekaterina Kishchuk, Tatiana Morgunova
2018	«Chico Loco»	Максим Фадеев / Maxim Fadeev	Ольга Серябкина, Екатерина Кищук, Татьяна Моргунова / Olga Seryabkina, Ekaterina Kishchuk, Tatiana Morgunova
2018	«Притяженья больше нет» (Максим Фадеев при участии Serebro)	Катерина Боловцова / Katerina Bolovtsova	Ольга Серябкина, Екатерина Кищук, Татьяна Моргунова / Olga Seryabkina, Ekaterina Kishchuk, Tatiana Morgunova
2018	«Пятница»	Артем Гряник / Artyom Gryanik	Ольга Серябкина, Екатерина Кищук, Татьяна Моргунова / Olga Seryabkina, Ekaterina Kishchuk, Tatiana Morgunova
2019	«О, мама»	Максим Фадеев / Maxim Fadeev	Марианна Кочурова, Елизавета Корнилова, Ирина Титова / Marianna Kochurova, Elizaveta Kornilova, Irina Titova
2024	«Song #2»	Максим Фадеев / Maxim Fadeev	Дарья Кузнецова, Айгуль Валиулина, Диана Рак / Daria Kuznetsova, Aygul Valiulina, Diana Rak
2025	«Надоело (105)»	Максим Фадеев / Maxim Fadeev	Дарья Кузнецова, Айгуль Валиулина, Диана Рак / Daria Kuznetsova, Aygul Valiulina, Diana Rak
2025	«Надоело (105) [Предел]»	Максим Фадеев / Maxim Fadeev	Дарья Кузнецова, Айгуль Валиулина, Диана Рак / Daria Kuznetsova, Aygul Valiulina, Diana Rak
2025	«Дай мне шанс»	Максим Фадеев / Maxim Fadeev	Дарья Кузнецова, Айгуль Валиулина, Диана Рак / Daria Kuznetsova, Aygul Valiulina, Diana Rak
2025	«Крылатые качели»	Максим Фадеев / Maxim Fadeev	Дарья Кузнецова, Айгуль Валиулина, Диана Рак / Daria Kuznetsova, Aygul Valiulina, Diana Rak
2025	«Звезды палят»	Максим Фадеев / Maxim Fadeev	Дарья Кузнецова, Айгуль Валиулина, Диана Рак / Daria Kuznetsova, Aygul Valiulina, Diana Rak
2025	«Снег идет (Mood video)»	Максим Фадеев / Maxim Fadeev	Дарья Кузнецова, Айгуль Валиулина, Диана Рак / Daria Kuznetsova, Aygul Valiulina, Diana Rak
2026	«Кто я для тебя»	Максим Фадеев / Maxim Fadeev	Дарья Кузнецова, Айгуль Валиулина, Диана Рак / Daria Kuznetsova, Aygul Valiulina, Diana Rak
2026	«Мало огня»	Максим Фадеев / Maxim Fadeev	Дарья Кузнецова, Айгуль Валиулина, Диана Рак / Daria Kuznetsova, Aygul Valiulina, Diana Rak
