= Let's Hold Hands =

"Davay derzhat'sya za ruki"

Single by Serebro

from the album Mama Lover
- English title: "Let's Hold Hands"
- Released: 1 November 2010
- Recorded: 2010
- Genre: Pop; house; Eurodance
- Length: 4:17
- Label: Monolit
- Songwriters: Maxim Fadeev; Olga Seryabkina
- Producer: Maxim Fadeev

Serebro singles chronology
"Ne vremya" (2010)	"Davay derzhat'sya za ruki" (2010)	"Mama Lover" (2011)

"Let's Hold Hands" (Russian: Давай держаться за руки, romanized: Davay derzhat'sya za ruki) is the seventh single performed by Russian girl group Serebro and written by Maxim Fadeev. The song is included on the group's second album (Mama Lover).

== Background ==
Maxim Fadeev, Serebro's manager, composed the song and co-wrote it with band member Olga Seryabkina. The demo version was released on 4 November 2010 through YouTube. Unlike previous Russian songs released by Serebro, an English version was not made available until the release of their second album where 'Angel Kiss' was released.

== Music video ==
Serebro in the music video for "Let's Hold Hands".

The music video for "Davay derzhat'sya za ruki" was directed by Yuri Kurokhtin. The video featured the band members performing nude, and in some scenes wearing white catsuits, against various white backgrounds. At the end of the video, all three members walk down a white hallway before the video fades to black.

Ello hosted the music video worldwide on 20 February 2011. The video was scheduled to be released on TV channel Europa Plus on 1 March 2011. The video also featured in Russia's most watched TV channels. A remix from DJ MIV was released for the House Megamix 2010 vol. 2.

The video is Serebro's second most watched on YouTube, with more than 1,900,000 views as of June 2012.

== Track listing ==
Digital download
(Released on 1 November 2010)

1. "Давай держаться за руки (Lets Hold Hands)" - 4:17

Other versions/remixes

1. "Давай держаться за руки (Dj MIV Remix)" - 4:40
2. "Давай держаться за руки (Extended Edit)" - 6:15
3. "Давай держаться за руки (Version II)" - 5:02
4. "Давай держаться за руки (Dubsteb version)" - 3:48

== Chart performance ==
The song debuted in Russia at number 108, later peaking at number 3 becoming the band's seventh top 10 single. The song has also peaked at number 18 in Ukraine and number 7 in Latvia.

=== Chart peaks and positions ===
Chart	Peak position
Russia Airplay (TopHit)	7
Ukraine	18
Latvia	7

== Personnel ==
- Anastasia Karpova – vocals
- Elena Temnikova – vocals
- Olga Seryabkina – vocals, lyrics
- Maxim Fadeev – songwriting, producer
