= Izbrannoe =

2010 EP by Serebro

EP by Serebro
- Released: March 2, 2010
- Recorded: 2009–2010
- Genres: Dance-pop, electropop, pop rock
- Length: 19:38
- Languages: English (1 Track); Russian (4 Tracks)
- Labels: Monolit Records, Symbolic Records
- Producer: Maxim Fadeev

Serebro chronology
OpiumRoz (2009)	Izbrannoe (2010)	Mama Lover (2012)

Singles from Izbrannoe
- 1. "Like Mary Warner" Released: 24 August 2009

Izbrannoe (Russian: Избранное; English: Favorites) is an extended play by Russian girl group Serebro, released internationally on March 2, 2010 by Monolit Records and Symbolic Records through iTunes. It was produced by Maxim Fadeev.

== Background ==
Serebro announced that they would release the EP on iTunes on March 2, 2010. The extended play features 5 songs, including their first new release after OpiumRoz, and after Marina Lizorkina's departure, "Сладко" along with a remix and an English version titled "Like Mary Warner". The other songs are "Опиум" (2008) and a remix of "Скажи, не молчи", both singles were released previously on the group's debut album.

== Track listing ==
No.	Title	Length
1.	"Like Mary Warner"	3:56
2.	"Opium"	3:45
3.	"Skazhi, ne Molchi (Remix)"	4:23
4.	"Sladko (Remix)"	4:20
5.	"Sladko (Pop edit)"	3:54
