= Like Mary Warner =

2009 single by Serebro

"Sladko"

Single by Serebro

from the album Izbrannoe
- English title: "Like Mary Warner"
- Released: 24 August 2009
- Recorded: 2009
- Genre: Electropop
- Length: 3:56
- Label: Monolit Records
- Songwriters: Maxim Fadeev; Olga Seryabkina

Serebro singles chronology
"Skazhi, ne molchi" (2008)	"Sladko" (2009)	"He vremya" (2010)

"Like Mary Warner" (Russian: Как марихуана, romanized: Kak marikhuana, lit. 'Like marijuana') is the fifth single by Russian girl group Serebro, released on 24 August 2009 (see 2009 in music). It is the first single to feature lyrics by Anastasia Karpova, and the song was not included on Serebro's debut album Opiumroz. The Russian version, "Sladko" (Сладко, 'Sweet'), topped the Russian Airplay Chart, becoming the band's fourth number one in Russia. Both versions of the song were composed by Maxim Fadeev and the Russian version was written by band member Olga Seryabkina.

== Track listing ==
Digital Download (Released on their website)

1. "Сладко (Pop Edit)" (Maxim Fadeev, Olga Seryabkina) – 03:56
2. "Сладко (Andrei Harchenko Remix)" (Maxim Fadeev, Olga Seryabkina, Andrei Harchenko) – 04:00
3. "Like Mary Warner" (Maxim Fadeev) – 03:56

== Chart positions ==
=== Weekly charts ===
Chart	Peak position
Russia Airplay (TopHit)	6
Moscow Airplay Chart	1
Latvia	5

=== Year-end charts ===
Chart (2009)	Position
Russia Airplay (TopHit)	91

== Personnel ==
- Anastasia Karpova, Olya Seryabkina, Elena Temnikova — vocals
- Maxim Fadeev — composer
