= Elena Temnikova =

Russian singer (born 1985)

- Елена Темникова
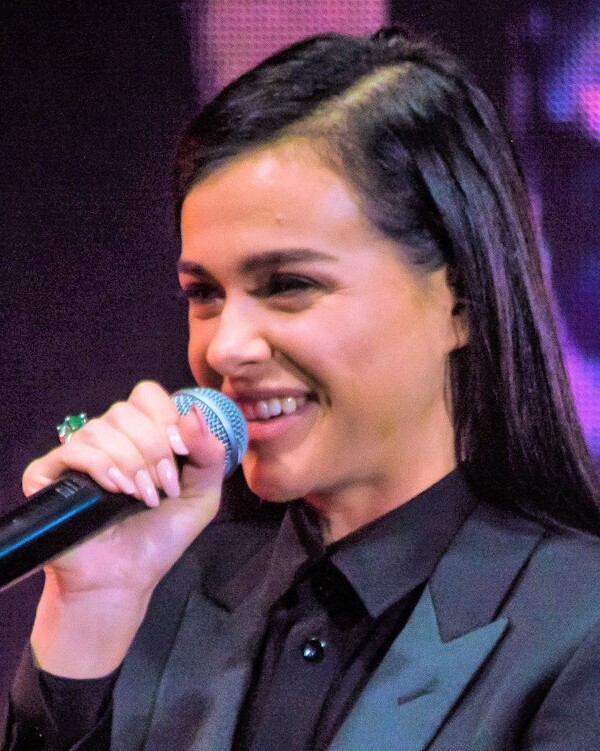
- Temnikova in 2017
- Born: Elena Vladimirovna Temnikova; 18 April 1985 (age 41); Kurgan, Kurgan Oblast, Russian SFSR, Soviet Union
- Occupations: Singer; television personality
- Spouses: Alexei Semyonov (m. 2004; div. 2008) Dmitry Sergeev (m. 2014)
- Children: 1
- Musical career
- Genres: Pop; dance-pop; Europop; house
- Instrument: Vocals
- Years active: 2003–present
- Label: TEMNIKOVA
- Formerly of: Serebro
- Website: www.temnikova.ru

Elena Vladimirovna Temnikova (Russian: Елена Владимировна Темникова; born 18 April 1985) is a Russian singer and television personality. She came to prominence as a contestant in the talent show Star Factory and as one of the three members of the girl group Serebro, who represented Russia in the Eurovision Song Contest 2007.

== Career ==
=== Star Factory and early solo career: 2003–06 ===
Temnikova started to study music when she was five years old; she was playing violin and singing in the choir. She came to media prominence as a contestant on the Channel One talent show Star Factory in 2003.

She was spotted by Maxim Fadeev, the main producer of Star Factory, and signed a recording contract with Fadeev's recording company Monolit Records.

Although Temnikova released two disco singles, "Begi" and "Taina", she did not continue her solo career, and did not release a solo album. She instead joined Serebro, a girl group formed by Fadeev. In an interview for the magazine InStyle, in February 2008, Temnikova said: "After Star Factory, Maxim Fadeev offered me a new job. He offered me to be lead singer in girl band. I decided to do it, and we together found second and third member". Olga Seryabkina and Marina Lizorkina also joined the group.

=== Serebro: 2007–14 ===
Serebro – consisting of Temnikova, Olga Seryabkina and Marina Lizorkina – represented Russia in the Eurovision Song Contest 2007 with the song "Song #1" and won the 3rd place, behind Serbia and Ukraine.

After their successful performance at the Eurovision Song Contest, Serebro has rapidly become one of the most successful artists in Russia. After "Song #1", they also released number-one singles "Дыши", "Опиум" and "Скажи, не молчи". After a release delay of their debut album, Opiumroz, it was finally released on 25 April 2009, and was presented at the band's concert in Bolshoi Theatre. Serebro was supported by other musicians, including by Russian entrant at the Eurovision Song Contest 2004 Yulia Savicheva; Opiumroz was prepared for two years. Karpova, Seryabkina and Temnikova later released Serebro's second album "Mama Lover".

On 15 May 2014 the official Serebro website reported that Elena had left the group due to pregnancy. She was replaced with Karpova who had left the band earlier the previous year until they find a replacement.

She is now a solo artist.

== Personal life ==
Raised in Kurgan, at the end of 2002 she moved to Omsk for few months and then to Moscow due to professional obligations.

In 2004, Temnikova married Alexei Semyonov, who was also a contestant in Star Factory. Temnikova sought separation soon after, but Semyonov would not agree to it. In the meantime, Semyonov fell in love with another woman and eventually sent Temnikova divorce papers, and the couple officially divorced after four years of marriage.

In 2014, Temnikova secretly married entrepreneur Dmitry Sergeev in the Maldives. Their daughter, Alexandra, was born on 27 March 2015.

In June 2019, Temnikova's former bandmate Olga Seryabkina came out as bisexual in an interview with the Russian tabloid Super. She did so to dispel rumors she was in a relationship with Maxim Fadeev, which were spread by Temnikova. In the interview, Seryabkina confirmed she had been in a four-year relationship with Temnikova while they were bandmates, and that the relationship was well known throughout their inner circle, but they had never confirmed it publicly.

== Discography ==
=== Studio Album ===
- TEMNIKOVA I (2016)
- TEMNIKOVA II (2017)
- TEMNIKOVA III: Не модные (Not Fashionable) (2018)
- TEMNIKOVA 4 (2019)
- TEMNIKOVA 5: Paris (2021)

=== Extended plays ===
- Импульсы (Remix) (2016)
- Выше крыш. Акустический лайв (LIVE @ Парк Горького, 2018) (2018)
- TEMNIKOVA 4 (Live) (2019)

=== Live albums ===
- TEMNIKOVA PRO I (2020)

=== Singles ===
Single	Year	Chart positions		Album
Single	Year	RUS	UKR	Album
"Дальше всех"	2003			non-album single
"Тайна"	2004			non-album single
"Зависимость"	2014	120	92	non-album single
"Навстречу"	2015	112	469	non-album single
"Наверно" (feat. Natan)	2015	6	26	non-album single
"Ревность"	2016	42	588	non-album single
"Импульсы города"	2016	7	57	TEMNIKOVA I
"Тепло"	2016	107	486	TEMNIKOVA I
"Движения"	2016	162	513	TEMNIKOVA I
"Не обвиняй меня"	2016	44	539	non-album single
"Давай улетим"	2017	39	5	non-album single
"Вдох"	2017	25	565	TEMNIKOVA II
"Не модные"	2018	7	-	TEMNIKOVA III: Не модные
"Бабочки"	2019	73		TEMNIKOVA 4
"Жара"	2019	15	73	non-album single
"Неон"	2020	28	40	non-album single
"Как Барби в поисках Кена"	2020	45	-	non-album single

=== Promotional Singles ===
Single	Year	Chart positions	Album
Single	Year	RUS	Album
"Улетаем"	2016	157	TEMNIKOVA I
"Сумасшедший русский" (feat. ST)	2017		Защитники (OST)
"Голые"	2017	207	non-album single
"Казался странным"	2017	141	TEMNIKOVA II
"Подсыпал"	2017	503	TEMNIKOVA II
"Мне нормально"	2017		TEMNIKOVA III: Не модные
"Пой со мной" (feat. Krec)	2017		non-album single
"Медленно"	2018		TEMNIKOVA III: Не модные
"Не сдерживай меня"	2018	227	TEMNIKOVA III: Не модные
"Под сердцами в кругах"	2018	540	non-album single
"Под луной"	2018	780	non-album single
"Нет связи"	2019	65	TEMNIKOVA 4
"Говорила"	2019	77	TEMNIKOVA 4
"Иди за мной"	2019	173	non-album single
"Обнимаю"	2019		non-album single
"Душит ювелирка"	2019		non-album single
"STRESS"	2019		non-album single
"DAIMNE.LOVE"	2019	430	non-album single
"Моё любимое"	2019		non-album single
"Как на фантиках Love Is"	2020	89	non-album single
"Фаталити (feat Kareena)"	2020		non-album single
"2020"	2020	408	non-album single
"Новогодняя"	2020		non-album single
"В м9се"	2021		TEMNIKOVA 5: Paris
"Бабочки и трип"	2021		TEMNIKOVA 5: Paris

=== Other charting songs ===
Single	Year	Chart positions	Album
Single	Year	RUS	Album
"Ближе"	2016	177	TEMNIKOVA I
"По низам"	2016	119	TEMNIKOVA I
"Счастье"	2016	170	TEMNIKOVA I
"Фиолетовый"	2017	151	TEMNIKOVA II

=== Features ===
Single	Year	Chart positions	Album
Single	Year	RUS	Album
"ЧЁРНЫЕ БЕЛЫЕ" (Callmeartur и Fabio featuring Elena Temnikova)	2018	—	Non-album singles
"Диджей" (Swanky Tunes featuring Elena Temnikova)	2018	104	Non-album singles
"Нереальная любовь" (feat. ЭММА М)	2019	6	Non-album singles
"Where You Wanna Be" (R3hab featuring Elena Temnikova)	2020	69	Non-album singles
"По краям" (feat. PIZZA)	2020	23	Non-album singles
"Из-за тебя" (feat. Ramil')	2021	145	Non-album singles
"—" denotes a recording that did not chart or was not released.

=== Music videos ===
Year	Music Video	Director	Album
2015	"Навстречу"	Igor Schmelev	non-album single
2015	"Наверно" (feat. Natan)	Aleksey Kupriyanov	non-album single
2016	"Ревность"	Aleksey Kupriyanov	non-album single
2016	"Импульсы города"	Daria Power	TEMNIKOVA I
2016	"Тепло"	Sasha Samsonova	TEMNIKOVA I
2016	"Движения"	Sasha Samsonova	TEMNIKOVA I
2017	"Сумасшедший русский" (feat. ST)	Nikita Argunov	Защитники (OST)
2017	"Не обвиняй меня"	Alexey Golubev	non-album single
2017	"Вдох"	Alan Badoev, costume designer: Sonya Soltes	TEMNIKOVA II
2017	"Казался странным"	Aisultan Seitov	TEMNIKOVA II
2018	"Фиолетовый"	Evgeny Sobolev	TEMNIKOVA II
2018	"Не сдерживай меня"	Evgeny Sobolev	TEMNIKOVA III
2018	"Не модные"	Kate Yak	TEMNIKOVA III
2019	"Бабочки"	Leo Kolos	TEMNIKOVA 4
2019	"Нет связи"	Leo Kolos	TEMNIKOVA 4
2019	"Говорила"	Leo Kolos	TEMNIKOVA 4
2019	"Душит ювелирка"	Leo Kolos	non-album single
2019	"Жара"	Medet Sheyakhmetov	non-album single
2020	"Как Барби в поисках Кена"	Gana Bogdan	non-album single
2020	"Как на фантиках Love Is"	Aleksey Bondar	non-album single

Preceded by Dima Bilan with "Never Let You Go"	Russia in the Eurovision Song Contest; 2007 (as part of Serebro)	Succeeded by Dima Bilan with "Believe"
