= No Time (Serebro song) =

2010 single by Serebro

"Ne vremya"

Single by Serebro

from the album Mama Lover
- English title: "No Time" "Sexing U"
- Released: 19 April 2010 (Russian); 18 September 2010 (English)
- Recorded: 2010
- Genre: Pop; electronic
- Length: 3:55
- Label: Monolit Records
- Songwriter(s): Maxim Fadeev; Olga Seryabkina

Serebro singles chronology
"Sladko" (2009)	"Ne vremya" (2010)	"Davay derzhat'sya za ruki" (2010)

"No Time" (Russian: Не Время, romanized: Ne vremya) is the sixth single by Russian girl group Serebro. The single was released on 19 April 2010 and is the second single to feature the vocals of group member, Anastasia Karpova, as well as the second single to be written by group producer Maxim Fadeev and band member Olga Seryabkina following "Sladko". The single's English counterpart "Sexing U" (sometimes stylised as "Sexing You") was first performed at the MTV Russia Beach Party on 28 August 2010 and later released on 18 September 2010.

== Release ==
"Ne vremya" was released on 19 April 2010 in Russia, and the first single from their upcoming second album. The digital download was released on the same day, however, the band later asked fans to remix their own version of the song and will be featured as the EP. After that was finished, a total of six members won the competition and their remixes were chosen. It was, however, released after one month of the official release. RussianFamous.com had said that the song was "filled with sensual vocals and languid eroticism, promises to be the main superhits this spring in Russia! Stylish sound, noble style and quality of European level – as always".

=== Sexing U ===
When the band released the single "Ne vremya", the band later released the English single version "Sexing U". The version was released also with "Ne vremya", but the single wasn't up for release until the 18 September 2010. A live version was also released at the MTV Russia Beach party on 28 August 2010.

== Music video ==
On 29 March 2010 it was announced on Serebro's official website that the group would begin filming for a new music video starting on 4 April 2010. The group also invited women between the ages of 18 and 30 with a "non-standard appearance (piercings, dreadlocks, braids, tattoos, vivid hair color, etc)" to send in applications to feature in their new video and were invited to do so until 3 April 2010 The video was released on 26 May 2010.

== Track list ==
- No Time - CD Single;
1. "Ne vremya" - 3:55
2. "Sexing U" - 3:55
- No Time Remixes EP;
1. "Ne vremya" (Art Tee Remix)
2. "Ne vremya" (Dee Jay Dan Remix)
3. "Ne vremya" (Harisma Remix)
4. "Ne vremya" (Alexandr Goncharenko Remix)
5. "Ne vremya" (Dark Version)
6. "Ne vremya" (Babanov Project Remix)

== Chart positions ==
=== Weekly charts ===
Chart	Peak position
Russia Airplay (TopHit)	13
Ukraine	17
Latvia	15

=== Year-end charts ===
2010 year-end chart performance for "Ne vremya"
Chart (2010)	Peak position
Russia Airplay (TopHit)	84
