= Skazhi, ne molchi =

Single by Serebro

from the album Opiumroz
- Released: November 2008
- Recorded: 2008
- Genre: Pop rock; soft rock
- Length: 3:35
- Label: Monolit Records
- Songwriter: Maxim Fadeev

Serebro singles chronology
"Opium" (2007)	"Skazhi, ne molchi" (2008)	"Sladko" (2009)

"Skazhi, ne molchi" (Russian: Скажи, не молчи, lit. 'Speak, do not be silent') is a song by Russian girl group Serebro, taken from their debut studio album Opiumroz. The song is the group's fourth single, and was written and produced by their manager Maxim Fadeev. The song is noted as the last single recorded and released by former band member Marina Lizorkina, after her departure due to financial and personal reasons on 18 June 2009. The song is Serebro's third number one on the Russian chart.

== Background ==
"Skazhi, ne molchi" was released as the fourth and final single from their debut studio album Opiumroz. The song was written and produced by their manager Maxim Fadeev, who produced all of their studio album and their singles (except for "Song #1", which received additional production).

The song was later re-recorded to include the vocals of new group member Anastasia Karpova, Marina Lizorkina's replacement. The re-recorded single was not released to airplay or the album but has been included on the group's EP, Izbrannoe, as a remixed single. No commercial release was performed for the single.

In the end of 2009, Serebro received a "Zolotoy Grammofon" award for the single.

== Music video ==
The music video starts off with Elena looking towards a light, with Olga and Marina also looking towards a light. Then it zooms to Olga sitting on a building rooftop, where the sky is pitch black and features Olga with dark angel wings, noted as a Dark Angel. Then features the group on a rooftop singing to the song.

Throughout the video, it features a woman in her home, where it appears she is depressed. She then starts crying briefly on the group. After the group sing in the second verse, it features the woman standing up from her couch and she stands with her hands wide, a similar pose to the Crucifixion of Jesus. Then after the group finish singing the last verse of the song, it features the woman sitting on the rooftop building, staring into the city, with her new angel wings, who is noted now as a guardian angel.

== Chart positions ==
=== Weekly charts ===
Chart (2008)	Peak position
CIS Airplay (TopHit)	1
Russia Airplay (TopHit)	1

=== Year-end charts ===
Chart (2008)	Position
CIS (Tophit)	176
Chart (2009)	Position
CIS (Tophit)	4
Russia Airplay (TopHit)	12
