= Katya Kischuk =

Russian singer (born 1993)

Katya Kischuk Катя Кищук
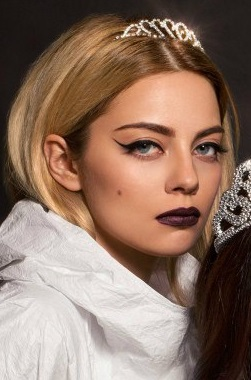
- Kischuk in 2016

Background information
- Also known as: Katerina; K
- Born: Ekaterina Sergeevna Kischuk; 13 December 1993 (age 32); Tula, Russia
- Occupations: Singer; blogger; songwriter
- Years active: 2016–present
- Formerly of: Serebro

Ekaterina Sergeevna "Katya" Kischuk (Russian: Екатерина Сергеевна "Катя" Кищук; born 13 December 1993), also known by her stage name K, or formerly Katerina, is a Russian singer, blogger, songwriter, and former member of the group Serebro.

In 2020, she was included in Forbes' 30 Most Promising Russians Under 30.

== Early life ==
Kischuk was born on 13 December 1993 in the city of Tula, Russia, to Sergey and Svetlana Kischuk. She is the youngest child in the family.

She was especially interested in music and dancing. As a teenager, she won the Russian Hip-Hop Championship twice. She went on to attend several higher education institutions, including the Moscow State Institute of Culture and Gnessin State Musical College. She went on to Thailand and China.

== Music career ==
=== 2016–2019: Serebro ===
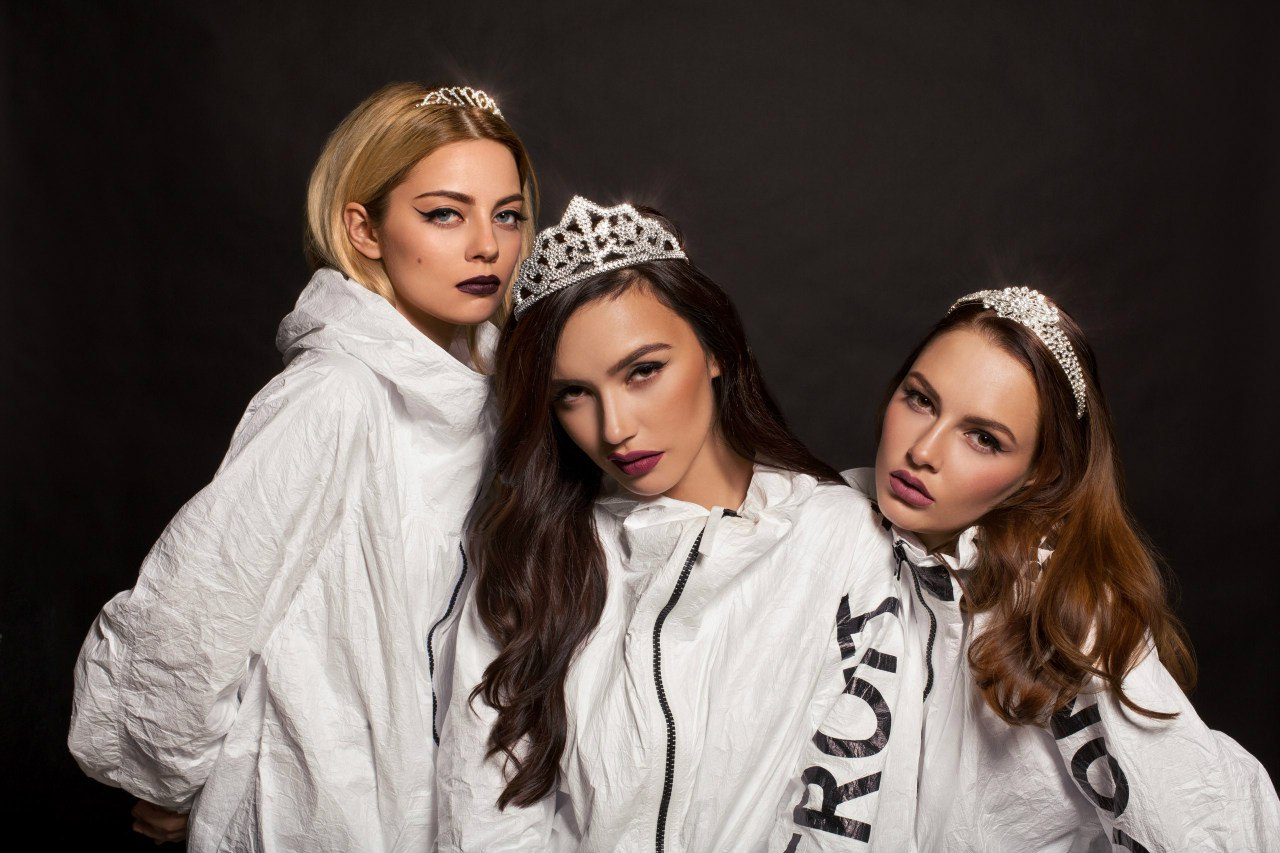
Kischuk (left) with Serebro bandmates Olga Seryabkina (center) and Polina Favorskaya (left) in 2016

Kischuk joined the Russian pop group Serebro in 2016.

During the three years she spent with the group, she was involved in the album The Power of Three in 2016 and the filming of nine videos. She left in 2019 at the same time as fellow band member Olga Seryabkina.

=== 2019–present: Solo career ===
Kischuk began her solo career on 1 February 2019. Due to her removal from the Malfa label by Maxim Fadeev, she also lost access to her Instagram account, which had more than one million followers. On 12 April 2019, she released her debut single titled Intro. Her debut album, 22K, was released in June 2019.

In December 2019, Kischuk, alongside the Ukrainian rock band "Vulgar Molly" collaborated on the song "Мишка (Bruin)", which also later featured on their album "Paycheck". The track translates as "Bear" in English. The Music video was released on YouTube on 20 Dec 2019.

In 2022, she returned to music, under the stage name K. She collaborated with Irish-Chilean music producer Sega Bodega and the British Singer and DJ Shygirl on the track "Out of Luck". The music video was released on 16 December 2022 via her official YouTube channel.

== Personal life ==
Kischuk began dating British rapper Slowthai in 2020. They became engaged in June of that year. Their son Rain was born on 18 June 2021. The couple broke up in 2022.
