= Monolit Records =

- Founded: 1994
- Founder: Maxim Fadeev
- Country of origin: Russia
- Location: Moscow
- Official website: http://www.pkmonolit.ru/

Monolit Records is a Russian record label founded in 1994 by Anton Pronin and Yuri Slyusar, with the support of Maxim Fadeev's Monolit production center. The label is one of the largest record companies in Russia.

Notable artists associated with the label include projects produced by Maxim Fadeev, such as Gluk’oZa, Linda, Katya Lel, Serebro, Irakli, and Molly.

In 2007, the company lost a lawsuit filed by Andrey Razin, the founder of the group Laskoviy May, who accused the label's record companies of illegally distributing the group's recordings. In the same year, Monolit won a lawsuit against a music retailer that had unlawfully distributed albums by Gluk’oZa, Nepara, Yuliya Savicheva, and Legalize without the consent of the copyright holder.

Since 2006, the label's director, Yuri Slyusar (son of Boris Nikolaevich Slyusar, former head of the Rostov Helicopter Plant), has led the National Federation of Phonogram Producers. Since November 2024, he has been serving as the acting governor of Rostov Oblast.
