= Song Number 1 =

2007 single by Serebro

"Song #1"

Single by Serebro

from the album Opiumroz
- Released: 2007
- Recorded: 2007
- Genre: Pop rock; electronic rock; dance-pop; electropop
- Length: 3:01
- Label: Studio Monolit
- Songwriters: Maxim Fadeev; Daniil Babichev

Serebro singles chronology
"Song #1" (2007)	"Dyshi" (2007)

Eurovision Song Contest 2007 entry
- Country: Russia
- Artists: Marina Lizorkina; Elena Temnikova; Olga Seryabkina
- As: Serebro
- Language: English
- Composer: Maxim Fadeev
- Lyricist: Daniil Babichev

Finals performance
- Final result: 3rd
- Final points: 207

Entry chronology
- ◄ "Never Let You Go" (2006)
- "Believe" (2008) ►

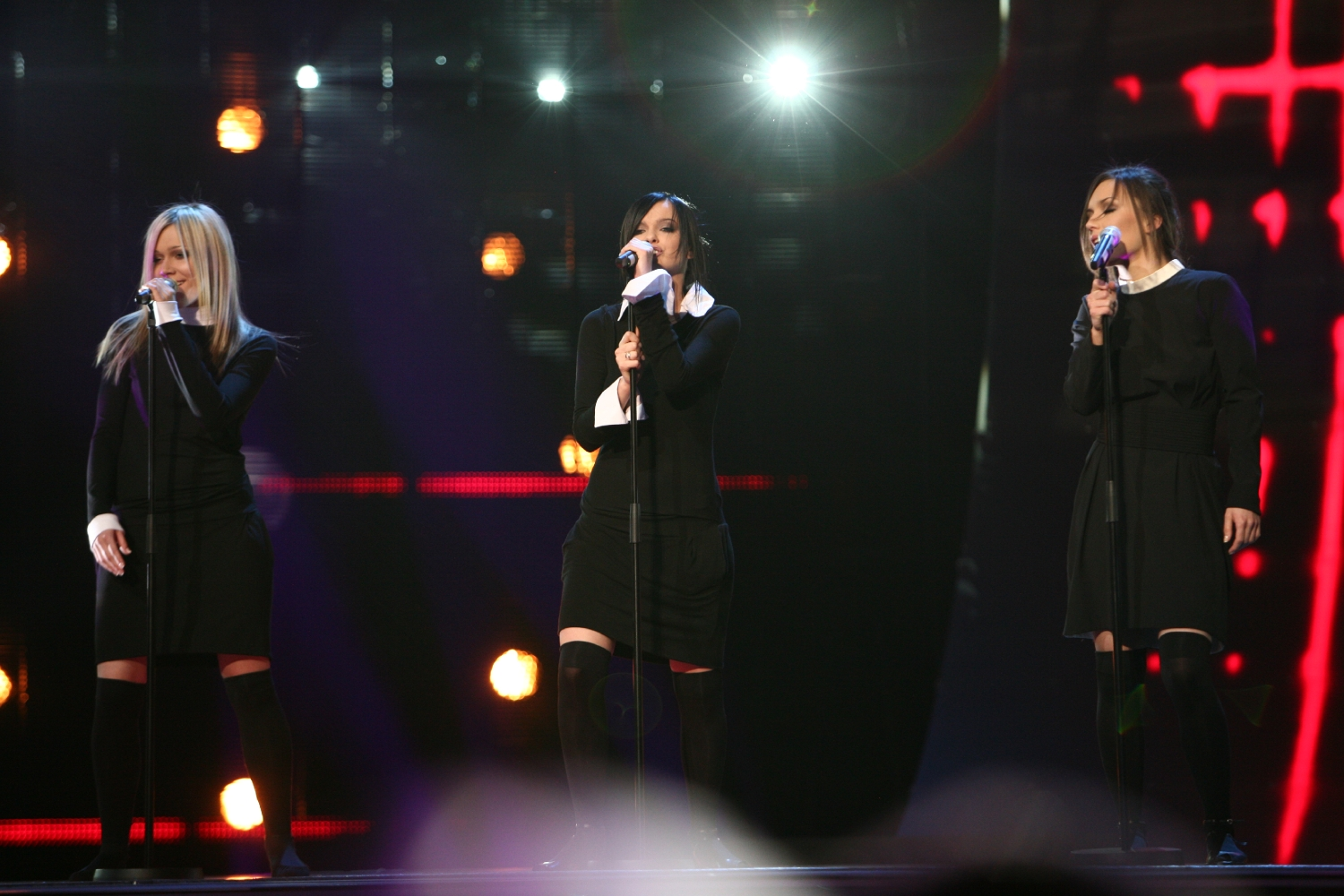
Serebro performing the song at the contest

"Song #1" is a song by Russian girl group Serebro. It is best known as Russia's entry to the Eurovision Song Contest 2007, held in Helsinki, Finland. They performed in the 15th position in the final, following Latvia's Bonaparti.lv with "Questa notte" and preceding Germany's Roger Cicero with "Frauen regier'n die Welt". It finished in third position with 207 points, behind second placed Ukraine and winner, Serbia.

== Music video ==
=== Promo version ===
The original clip for "Song #1" is known as the promo version. It is also known as "red version" as it is the shortened version that was performed at the Eurovision Song Contest 2007.

The clip begins with the girls putting on the dresses they wore when they performed the song at Eurovision. The girls sing to the camera individually against a cushion-like, red background with clips of an electric guitar being played. Marina and Olya sing together into one microphone against a busy, yellow background and Lena approaches, via the stairs in the centre screen, three microphones on a small well-lit stage surrounded by red lights. Marina and Olya then appear from either side of the screen and they all stand up to their microphones.

The bright, white lights in the background flash almost blinding the scene with just the girls present and they dim down as Lena sings. Against the light, the guitar player can be seen and against the other light (opposite side of the screen) there are two backing singers. The scenes then alternate between the stage, red rooms and yellow background. The lights behind the girls on the stage continue to flash then dim again. As the chorus starts a scene is introduced where the girls stand together in a sky blue background. The scenes alternate again but this time the blue background replaces the yellow one. As the chorus ends only the blue and yellow backgrounds are used as Lena sings "so come on check it" and in the yellow scene Marina and Olya sing "out".

The video resumes switching between three scenes, stage, red rooms and blue backing. As Lena begins her solo, the background changes to a busy blue, with Lena now wearing a shiny, gold, sleeveless top.

The instrumental begins in the sky-blue background but the girls are now joined by a large group of people wearing only black and white like the girls' dresses. Lena blows hair out of her face and the group begins to dance in uniform. The scene changes when the girls sing "Ow!" which shows them on the stage with the lights illuminating the scene. The scenes alternate again between stage, red, yellow and blue. As the song ends, the lights engulf the girls, ending the clip.

== Variations ==
There are several variations of "Song #1". The title remains the same with the addition of a colour following it. There are 14 versions in all with colours:

- Red (Eurovision short version)
- Violet
- Black
- Pink
- Green
- Yellow
- Sky Blue
- Vinous
- Grey
- White
- Blue
- Red 2 (extended video version)
- Orange (a cappella)
- Silver (video)

There are two Russian versions of this song: a radio (Russian: Песня #1, romanized: Pesnya #1) and an uncensored version. There is also an instrumental version, as well as many unofficial remixes of the song.

== Charts ==
=== Weekly charts ===
2007 Weekly chart performance for "Song #1"
Chart (2007)	Peak position
CIS Airplay (TopHit)	1
Russia Airplay (TopHit)	1
Sweden (Sverigetopplistan)	35
Switzerland (Schweizer Hitparade)	68
Ukraine Airplay (TopHit)	4
UK Singles (OCC)	99

2008 Weekly chart performance for "Song #1"
Chart (2008)	Peak position
Ukraine Airplay (TopHit)	31

2009 Weekly chart performance for "Song #1"
Chart (2009)	Peak position
CIS Airplay (TopHit)	196
Russia Airplay (TopHit)	182
Ukraine Airplay (TopHit)	168

2011 Weekly chart performance for "Song #1"
Chart (2011)	Peak position
Ukraine Airplay (TopHit)	192

2013 Weekly chart performance for "Song #1"
Chart (2013)	Peak position
Ukraine Airplay (TopHit)	182

2014 Weekly chart performance for "Song #1"
Chart (2014)	Peak position
Ukraine Airplay (TopHit)	147

2015 Weekly chart performance for "Song #1"
Chart (2015)	Peak position
Ukraine Airplay (TopHit)	62

2019 Weekly chart performance for "Song #1"
Chart (2019)	Peak position
Ukraine Airplay (TopHit)	138

=== Monthly charts ===
2007 Monthly chart performance for "Song #1"
Chart (2007)	Peak position
CIS Airplay (TopHit)	5
Russia Airplay (TopHit)	5
Ukraine Airplay (TopHit)	7

2008 Monthly chart performance for "Song #1"
Chart (2008)	Peak position
Ukraine Airplay (TopHit)	75

=== Year-end charts ===
2007 year-end chart performance for "Song #1"
Chart (2007)	Position
CIS Airplay (TopHit)	30
Russia Airplay (TopHit)	34
Ukraine Airplay (TopHit)	16

=== Decade-end charts ===
Decade-end chart performance for "Song #1"
Chart (2000–2009)	Position
CIS Airplay (TopHit)	149
Russia Airplay (TopHit)	182
Ukraine Airplay (TopHit)	137
