= OpiumRoz =

2009 studio album by Serebro

Studio album by Serebro
- Released: 25 April 2009 (Russia)
- Recorded: 2007–2009
- Genre: Electronic rock
- Length: 47:20
- Language: English (6 Tracks); Russian (5 Tracks)
- Label: Monolit Records
- Producer: Maxim Fadeev

Serebro chronology
OpiumRoz (2009)	Izbrannoe (2010)

Singles from OpiumRoz
- 1. "Song #1" Released: 1 May 2007; 2. "Дыши" Released: 5 September 2007; 3. "Опиум" Released: 3 March 2008; 4. "Скажи, не молчи" Released: 10 November 2008

OpiumRoz (Russian: ОпиумRoz, translated: Opium of Roses) is the debut studio album of Russian girlband Serebro. It was released 25 April 2009 by Monolit Records in Russia, and 2 March 2010 by Symbolic Records. It was produced by Maxim Fadeev and some of Serebro themselves. The album originally had a projected release date of 17 October 2008 but due to problems with the track list the release had been delayed. The album was later released April 25, 2009 in their native Russia. The album was later released through iTunes worldwide by the Finnish record label Symbolic Records.

Both versions of the album feature 11 tracks in total and include their debut single and Eurovision Song Contest 2007 entry "Song #1". Marina Lizorkina's vocals feature on both versions, though she left group in June 2009 (before the international release). It didn't chart in any major album charts. The album received critical acclaim from critics, calling it an amazing taste of music genres of Pop, Rock and Electro, but had less commercial success. The album was recorded in Moscow, Russia by their management group Monolit Records.

== Background and recording ==
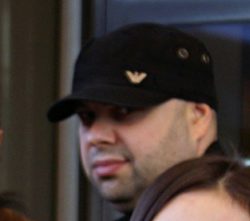
Maxim Fadeev (pictured) the band's main producer for the album OpiumRoz

After Serebro achieved third place in the Eurovision Song Contest 2007, the group was signed with Russian record label, Monolit Records. The band mostly did their work in Moscow, Russia, the band's mainland as the label was its current location. The band recorded 11 tracks for the album, 6 English tracks were planned for the album and the remaining 5 tracks were recorded in Russian. The group recorded in 2007 through to 2008, and planned for a 17 October 2008 release once the album had finished recording. Serebro and their management struggled with the track list when it came to narrowing down the choice of recorded tracks and because of this the album was delayed. After the band recorded songs, and released the four songs from it, the band's member Marina Lizorkina later separated from the band, due to financial and personal reasons.

== Release ==
=== Promotion ===
To promote their debut album, Serebro organised an outdoor concert on April 25, 2009, at Poklonnaya Hill, Moscow where fans were free to attend. Band member Elena Temnikova said of the concert: "We do not want to organize a feast during the plague, to make the grand presentation with champagne and caviar, as it is in our show business. In a difficult economic situation in Russia and in the world to arrange a costly celebration on the occasion of the release is not right. Therefore, we decided to make a presentation in an unusual format—an open, completely free concert. We spoke to people who supported us over the past two years, who were anxious for us, listening to our songs, have been and remain our loyal fans. They were waiting for the release of this album for two years and, as a sign of gratitude, we gave these people our music." Other acts were asked to perform alongside Serebro and the line-up included Band'Eros, Mitya Fomin, Total and two new Maxim Fadeev projects, Voron and China. The group performed all songs featured on the album to a crowd of 70 thousand fans, an impressive turnout for the group's first solo project.

In March 2010, the album was released through iTunes worldwide by the Finnish record label Symbolic Records.

=== Singles ===
The album produced four singles, more were planned for release, but this was cancelled after Marina Lizorkina's departure from the group in 2009.

Song #1 was also released as maxi-single on CD and digitally with 13 different versions, subtitled with color names, like Silver, Blue and Green versions. The single, also being charted at number 224,115 on Amazon.com.

The second single was "Дыши", released on 5 September 2007, the third single "Опиум" was released on 3 March 2008.

The fourth single to be released from the album, "Скажи, не молчи", was later re-recorded to include the vocals of new group member Anastasia Karpova, Marina Lizorkina's replacement. The re-recorded single was not released to airplay or the album but has been included on the group's EP, Izbrannoe, as remixed single.

== Critical reception ==
Professional ratings
Review scores
Source	Rating
NewsMusic.ru	8/10

OpiumROZ had received positive reviews from independent critics. NewsMusic.ru said it is that half the album is "hard experimental songs" like The Prodigy and Depeche Mode. The review said that "Sound Sleep" saying "the five-minute psychedelic art-rock with magical sketch whisperings and scope of ethnic ostinato riffs that sends almost to Pink Floyd. Made from the heart, but without the extension.

== Commercial response ==
On 25 April 2009, Serebro released OpiumRoz in Russia. It had much more attention in Russia, Latvia and Ukraine than in other countries. On Amazon.com, it was released by Monolit Records. On 2 March 2010, OpiumRoz was released on iTunes by a Finnish label, Symbolic Records.

In the US and Oceania, it has had moderate success, but Song #1 was very popular.

== Digital removal ==
Around the end of 2012, OpiumRoz was removed from iTunes worldwide. From some reports, Symbolic Records had lost the publishing rights of the studio album hence why the studio album was removed from digital retails. Not long after, the album was also removed from Amazon.com without an excuse why.

All the group's releases, including Mama Lover and EP's remained on the iTunes accounts and this now means that OpiumRoz could be counted as a collector's item physically and digitally. The album's songs, including non-singles like "Angel Dust", "We Take Off" and "Under Pressure", can still be searched on live streaming music websites.

In 2019 the album was made available on iTunes again, and in 2020 it came back to Spotify too.

== Singles ==
Year	Title	Chart positions								
Year	Title	RU	SWE	CHE	DNK	EU	UKR	LTV	LTU	UK
2007	"Song #1"	1	35	68	72	125	—	16	36	97
2007	"Дыши"	2	—	—	—	—	—	3	—	—
2008	"Опиум"	1	—	—	—	25	—	5	—	—
2008	"Скажи, не молчи"	1	—	—	—	5	—	4	—	—

== Track list ==
=== Monolit Russian edition ===
No.	Title	Producer(s)	Length
1.	"Song #1"	Maxim Fadeev	3:01
2.	"Дыши" (Breathe)	Maxim Fadeev	4:30
3.	"Under Pressure"	Maxim Fadeev	3:27
4.	"Dirty Kiss"	Maxim Fadeev	4:42
5.	"Sound Sleep"	Maxim Fadeev	5:11
6.	"Пыль ангелов" (Dust of Angels)	Maxim Fadeev	3:31
7.	"Never Be Good"	Maxim Fadeev	3:15
8.	"What's Your Problem"	Maxim Fadeev	3:34
9.	"Скажи, не молчи" (Say, Don't Be Silent)	Maxim Fadeev	3:34
10.	"Опиум" (Opium)	Maxim Fadeev	3:44
11.	"Мы взлетаем" (We're Taking Off)	Maxim Fadeev	7:37

=== Symbolic international edition ===
No.	Title	Producer(s)	Length
1.	"Dirty Kiss"	Maxim Fadeev	4:42
2.	"Dyshi"	Maxim Fadeev	4:30
3.	"Mi vlzetaem"	Maxim Fadeev	7:37
4.	"Never Be Good"	Maxim Fadeev	3:15
5.	"Opium"	Maxim Fadeev	3:44
6.	"Pil' angelov"	Maxim Fadeev	3:31
7.	"Skazhi, ne molchi"	Maxim Fadeev	3:44
8.	"Song #1"	Maxim Fadeev	3:01
9.	"Sound Sleep"	Maxim Fadeev	5:11
10.	"Under Pressure"	Maxim Fadeev	4:35
11.	"What's Your Problem"	Maxim Fadeev	3:34

== Team ==
=== Vocals ===
- Elena Temnikova
- Marina Lizorkina
- Olga Seryabkina

=== Producer ===
- Maxim Fadeev
