= Breathe (Serebro song) =

2007 single by Serebro

"Dyshi"

Single by Serebro

from the album OpiumRoz
- English title: "Breathe"
- Released: 2007
- Recorded: 2007
- Genre: Ambient; electronica
- Length: 4:30
- Label: Monolit Records
- Songwriters: Maxim Fadeev; Daniil Babitchev

Serebro singles chronology
"Song #1" (2007)	"Dyshi" (2007)	"Opium" (2008)

"Breathe" (Russian: Дыши, romanized: Dyshi) is the second song released in 2007 by Russian girl group Serebro. Due to their first song being called "Song #1", "Breathe" is often referred to as "Song #2", continued for their next song "Opium", also known as "Song #3".

== Video ==
The video starts underwater and Serebro walks along the seabed in large flowing dresses. The girls walk past sea-life as underwater scenes are displayed. About half a minute in, a city can be seen at the bottom of the ocean. As they proceed across the sea bed a fish passes which is enormous in scale compared to the girls and a school of small fish surround them and swim around them in a dance-like fashion as the motion slows down and speeds up. A large whale breaks through the seabed and the girls continue to walk ahead.

Now the girls are on land and walk alongside a canyon where several hot air balloons emerge. They now walk through a barren countryside with water towers in the distance.

The scene changes again with the girls now in a city, rain falling heavily. Another large whale breaks through although this time through a road and the girls stop as Lena points toward it. The city becomes bright and clear of rain and airplanes soar in the distance. A plane approaches, driving across the road, and the girls walk under it. The girls are then back in a rainy scene where their mouths sync with the words sang, but their actions move backward until they freeze. Again in the clear city, a train passes very quickly as the girls approach the track and in slow motion the girls recoil and begin to fall backward. As they hit the pavement, it splashes and the girls sink into it as if it were water.

The girls are then seen walking toward the camera individually with a glaring sun and skyscrapers in the background.

The video ends with the girls emerging from a black car in an alleyway as it rains heavily. We see each of the girls individually again and the screen blacks out.

== Track list ==
Extended Play Single (Promotional release in 2007)

1. "Dyshi"
2. "Song #2"
3. "Song #1"
4. "Dancing #1"
5. "Whats Your Problem?" (Live)

== Charts ==
=== Weekly charts ===
Chart (2007)	Peak position
CIS Airplay (TopHit)	2
Russia Airplay (TopHit)	1

=== Year-end charts ===
Chart (2007)	Position
CIS (Tophit)	24
Russia Airplay (TopHit)	31
Chart (2008)	Position
CIS (Tophit)	91
Russia Airplay (TopHit)	119

=== Decade-end charts ===
Decade-end chart performance for "Dyshi"
Chart (2000–2009)	Position
Russia Airplay (TopHit)	54
