= Opium (Serebro song) =

Single by Serebro

from the album Opiumroz
- Released: 18 March 2008
- Recorded: 2008
- Genre: Electronic rock
- Length: 3:33
- Label: Studio Monolit
- Songwriter(s): Maxim Fadeev

Serebro singles chronology
"Dyshi" (2007)	"Opium" (2008)	"Skazhi, ne molchi" (2008)

"Opium" (Russian: Опиум) is the third released single by Russian girl group Serebro. Given its order of release, the song is nicknamed "Song #3" after its predecessors "Song #1" and "Song #2" (i.e. "Dyshi"). This was the fourth song to be made public from Serebro's album Opiumroz after "What's Your Problem?" was performed at the RMA on 4 October 2007.

== Debut ==
On 13 March 2008 Serebro announced on their official website that they would be releasing their third official single "Opium". The song premiered on the Russian morning radio show BrigadaU on Europa Plus. The video debuted on MUV-TV on 7 May 2008.

== Charts ==
The song peaked at number one in Russia, becoming Serebro's second number one single.

=== Weekly charts ===
Chart (2008)	Peak position
CIS Airplay (TopHit)	1
Russia Airplay (TopHit)	1

=== Year-end charts ===
Chart (2008)	Position
CIS (Tophit)	25
Russia Airplay (TopHit)	49
