= Russia in the Eurovision Song Contest 2007 =

- Eurovision Song Contest 2007
- Country: Russia
- Selection process: Internal selection
- Announcement date: Artist: 8 March 2007; Song: 14 March 2007

Competing entry
- Song: "Song #1"
- Artist: Serebro
- Songwriters: Maxim Fadeev; Daniil Babichev

Placement
- Final result: 3rd, 207 points

Participation chronology

Russia was represented at the Eurovision Song Contest 2007 with the song "Song #1", written by Maxim Fadeev and Daniil Babichev, and performed by Serebro. Despite early indications that the Russian participation for 2007 would be organised by Rossiya Channel (RTR), Channel One Russia (C1R) remained in charge of selecting the Russian entry and retained the broadcast rights for the 2007 Contest. The Russian entry was selected internally by C1R. At the contest, Russia placed 3rd in the final, scoring 207 points.

== Before Eurovision ==
=== Internal selection ===
To select a Russian Eurovision representative for the 2007 contest, broadcaster RTR, which regained the right to choose a participant for Russia, was rumoured to be organising a national selection with three artists selected by the channel. However, in January 2007, it was announced that Channel One had regained the right to choose the 2007 participant after RTR decided to participate in the Eurovision Dance Contest instead. On 20 January 2007, C1R announced a submission period for interested artists and composers to submit their entries until 1 March 2007. A jury panel was to evaluate the received submissions on 3 March 2007 and select the Russian entry, however a decision was not reached and instead five candidates were shortlisted: Aleksandr Panayotov and Alexey Chumakov, Band'Eros, Gorod 312, Serebro and Zveri.

On 8 March 2007, C1R announced that they had internally selected Serebro to represent Russia in Helsinki. The announcement occurred during the Channel One programme Vysshaya Liga. Serebro's selection as the Russian representative was decided upon by the jury panel from the five shortlisted candidates following a closed audition held on the same day. The Russian song, "Song #1", was presented to the public on 14 March 2007 during a special radio programme broadcast on Europa Plus. "Song #1" was composed by creator of the group Maxim Fadeev, with lyrics by Daniil Babichev. Fadeev previously composed the 2004 Russian entry. The song was also presented on 24 March 2007 during Vysshaya Liga.

First Round
Artist	Song
Aleksandr Panayotov and Alexey Chumakov	"Ne moya (Every Little Thing)" (Не моя)
Alexey Goman	Unknown
Amarhuu Borhuu	Unknown
Amatory	"Sneg v adu" (Снег в аду)
Anastasia Stotskaya	Unknown
A-Sortie	Unknown
Band'Eros	Unknown
Boris Moiseev	Unknown
Catharsis	Unknown
Chay Vdvoyom	Unknown
Chelsi	Unknown
Dark Princess	"Stop My Heart"
Dark Princess	"Please Betray Me"
Dark Princess	"Join Me in Life"
Diana Gurtskaya	Unknown
Dima Bilan	Unknown
Evra	"Save This Day"
Gorod 312	Unknown
Jam	"My Girl"
Jasmin	Unknown
Jukebox	Unknown
KuBa	Unknown
MaxiM	Unknown
Origami	"V serdtse moyem" (В сердце моём)
Polina Griffith	Unknown
Plazma	"Living in the Past"
Premyer-Ministr	Unknown
Private Beat	"One and Only"
Psikhea	"British (Mishen)" (Мишень)
Ranetki	"Angely" (Ангелы)
Ruslan Alekhno	Unknown
Samotsvety	Unknown
Serebro	"Song #1"
~~Sergey Lazarev~~ (Note: Sergey withdrew his candidacy from the selection due to the fact that Sergey wanted to submit a solo application, but the Channel One insisted only on his participation as part of duo "Smash!!".)	Unknown
Sogdiana	Unknown
Valeriya	Unknown
Victoria Dayneko	Unknown
Zara	Unknown
Zveri	Unknown

Second Round
Artist	Song	Place
Aleksandr Panayotov and Alexey Chumakov	"Ne moya (Every Little Thing)" (Не моя)	2
Band'Eros	Unknown	—
Gorod 312	Unknown	—
Serebro	"Song #1"	1
Zveri	Unknown	—

== At Eurovision ==
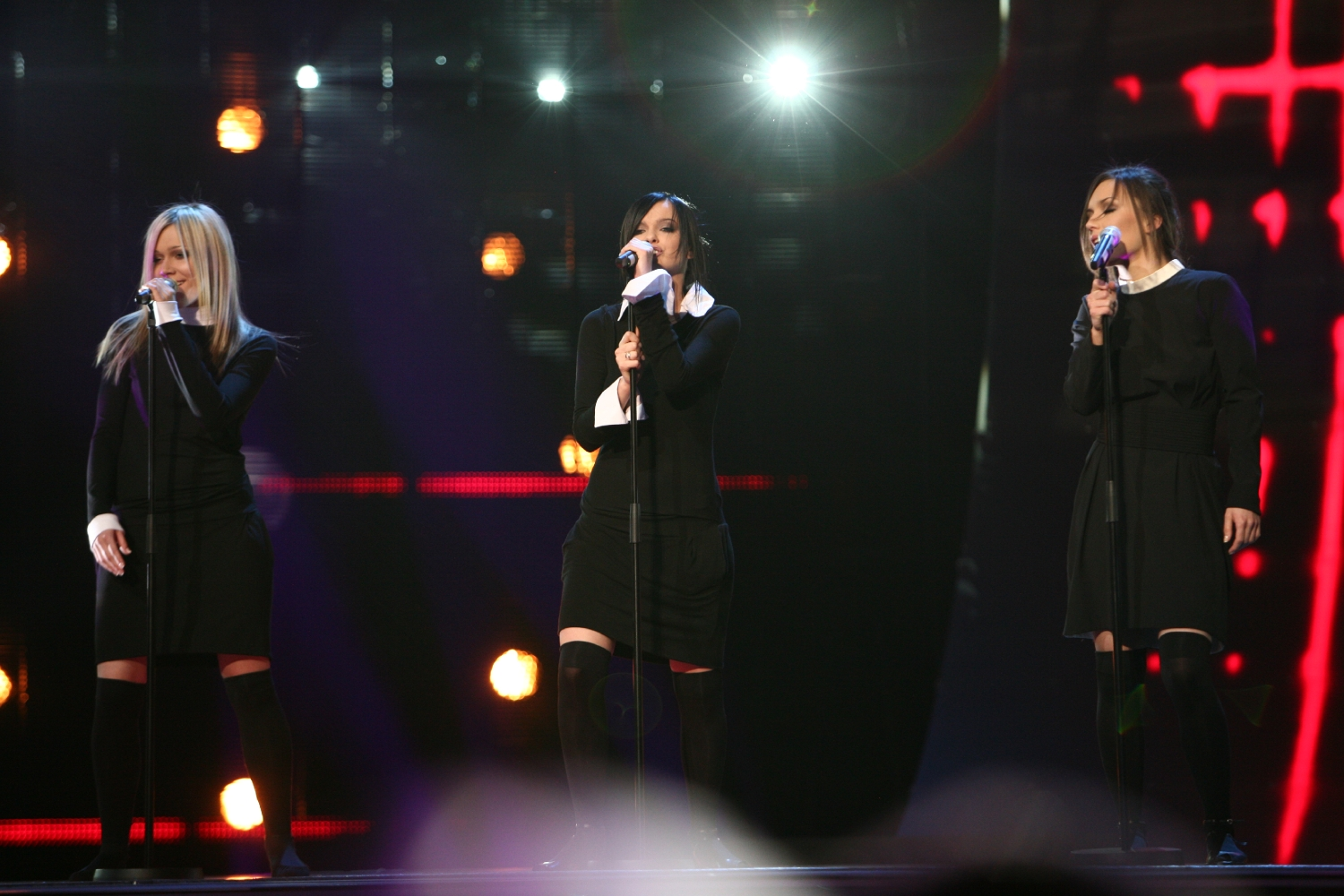
Serebro performing at the Eurovision Song Contest 2007 final in Helsinki.

Since Russia placed within the top 10 countries (excluding the Big Four) in the 2006 Contest, Russia pre-qualified to compete directly in the final of the Eurovision Song Contest 2007. On 12 March 2007, Russia was drawn to perform 15th in the final on 12 May 2007, following a slot allotted for a semi-finalist qualifier, which was ultimately filled by Latvia and preceding Germany. After the voting concluded, Russia scored 207 points and placed 3rd.

The semi-final and final were broadcast on Channel One, with commentary by Yuriy Aksyuta and Elena Batinova. The voting spokesperson for Russia was Yana Churikova.

=== Voting ===
==== Points awarded to Russia ====
Points awarded to Russia (Final)
Score	Country
12 points	Armenia; Belarus; Estonia
10 points	Ukraine
8 points	Greece; Israel; Moldova; Turkey
7 points	Cyprus; Georgia; Latvia; Serbia
6 points	Czech Republic; Germany; Hungary; Ireland; Lithuania; Malta; Montenegro; United Kingdom
5 points	Bulgaria; Macedonia; Norway; Sweden
4 points	Portugal; Spain
3 points	Andorra; Croatia; Finland; Poland; Romania; Slovenia
2 points	Bosnia and Herzegovina; Denmark; France
1 point	Iceland

==== Points awarded by Russia ====
Points awarded by Russia (Semi-final)
Score	Country
12 points	Belarus
10 points	Georgia
8 points	Serbia
7 points	Turkey
6 points	Moldova
5 points	Slovenia
4 points	Andorra
3 points	Hungary
2 points	Latvia
1 point	Israel

Points awarded by Russia (Final)
Score	Country
12 points	Belarus
10 points	Armenia
8 points	Ukraine
7 points	Georgia
6 points	Moldova
5 points	Serbia
4 points	Bulgaria
3 points	Slovenia
2 points	Turkey
1 point	Romania
