= Anastasia Karpova =

Russian singer (born 1984)

Anastasia Karpova Анастасия Карпова
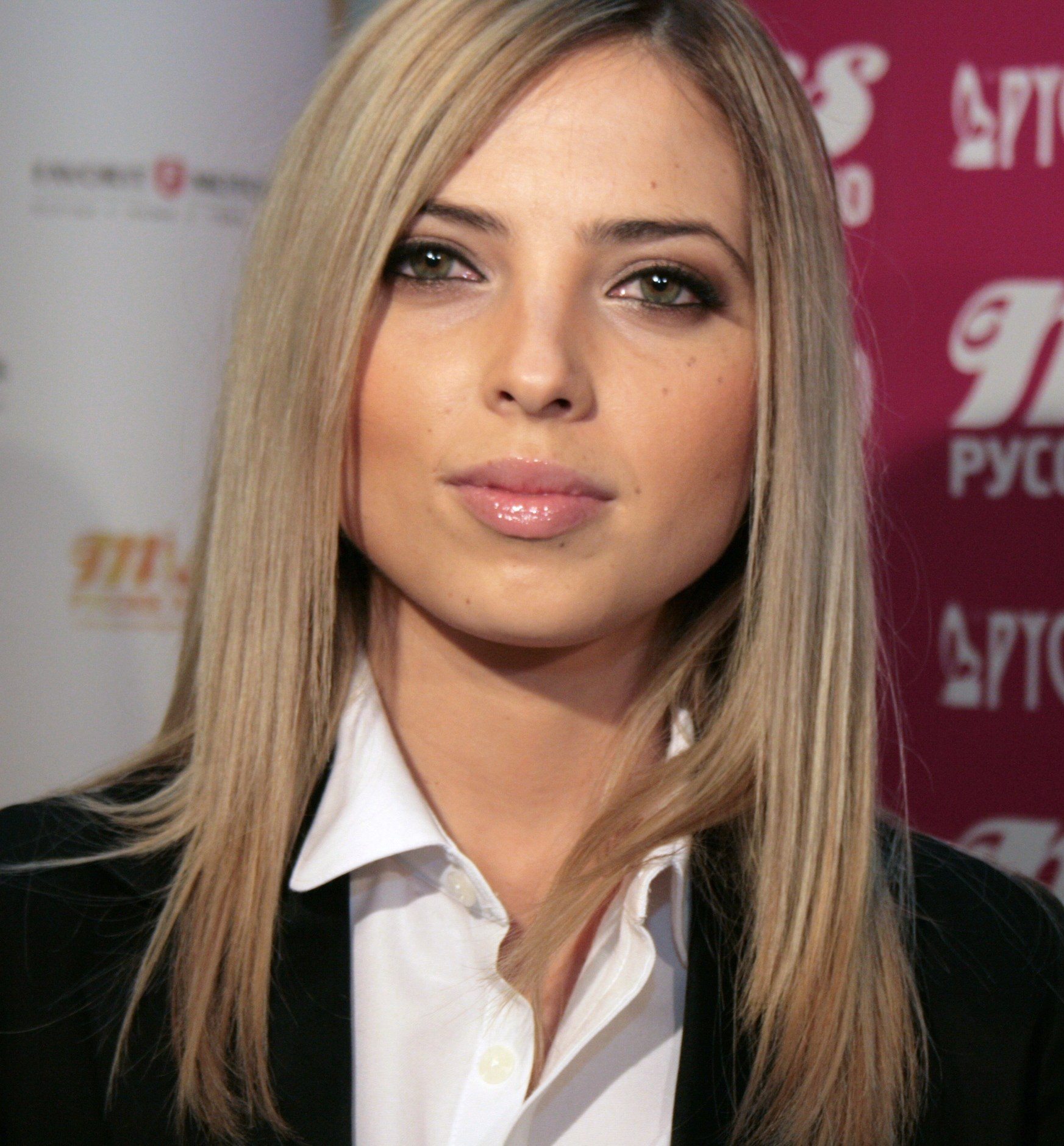
- Anastasia Karpova

Background information
- Birth name: Anastasia Karpova
- Also known as: Nastya Karpova
- Born: 2 November 1984 (age 40); Balakovo, Saratov Oblast, USSR
- Genres: Pop, Europop, deep house
- Occupation(s): Singer, dancer
- Instrument: Vocals
- Years active: 2009–present
- Labels: Monolit Records
- Website: Official Serebro Site

Anastasia Karpova (Russian: Анастасия Карпова; born 2 November 1984) is a Russian singer, best known as a member of girl group Serebro. She became a Serebro member after Marina Lizorkina left the band in 2009.

== Early life ==
Anastasia Karpova was born on 2 November 1984 in Balakovo, Saratov Oblast, Russia. Although she was very interested in music from an early age, Karpova dedicated herself to dance and became a member of the ballet troupe "Street Jazz". She also attended singing classes later deciding to pursue a singing career.

== Serebro ==
On 18 June 2009 it was announced that Marina Lizorkina had left the Russian girl group Serebro, who represented Russia in the Eurovision Song Contest 2007 and eventually gained great popularity in Russia and former countries of the USSR. The producer of Serebro, Maxim Fadeev, had opened an audition for a new band member. Karpova replaced Lizorkina, and joined Elena Temnikova and Olga Seryabkina as a new singer of the trio. She stated, "Destiny often gives you a chance to win. The thing is to use it properly".

Karpova appeared in public as a Serebro member for the first time at the Radio Hit Group Award in Saint Petersburg on 25 June 2009. She has also recently recorded a completely new song with Serebro, "Like Mary Warner", and filmed an accompanying music video. At a concert on 27 September 2013 in Saint-Petersburg, Karpova announced that it was her last concert with the group, choosing to leave the group, to focus on her solo career.

When Elena Temnikova left, officially on health grounds, Karpova agreed to return temporarily to enable Serebro to fulfill the live concerts as a trio.

== Discography ==
Singles

- "With you" (2014)
- "Mama" (featuring Walls) 2014
- "I'll Tear it Up" (2015)
- "Fly" (2015)
- "Keep Warm" (2016)
- " Mad " (2018)
- "MFL" (2018)
- "Cannon" (2019)
- "Run Away" (2019)
- "Mistletoe" (featuring Walls) 2020
