= Plazma =

Russian musical group

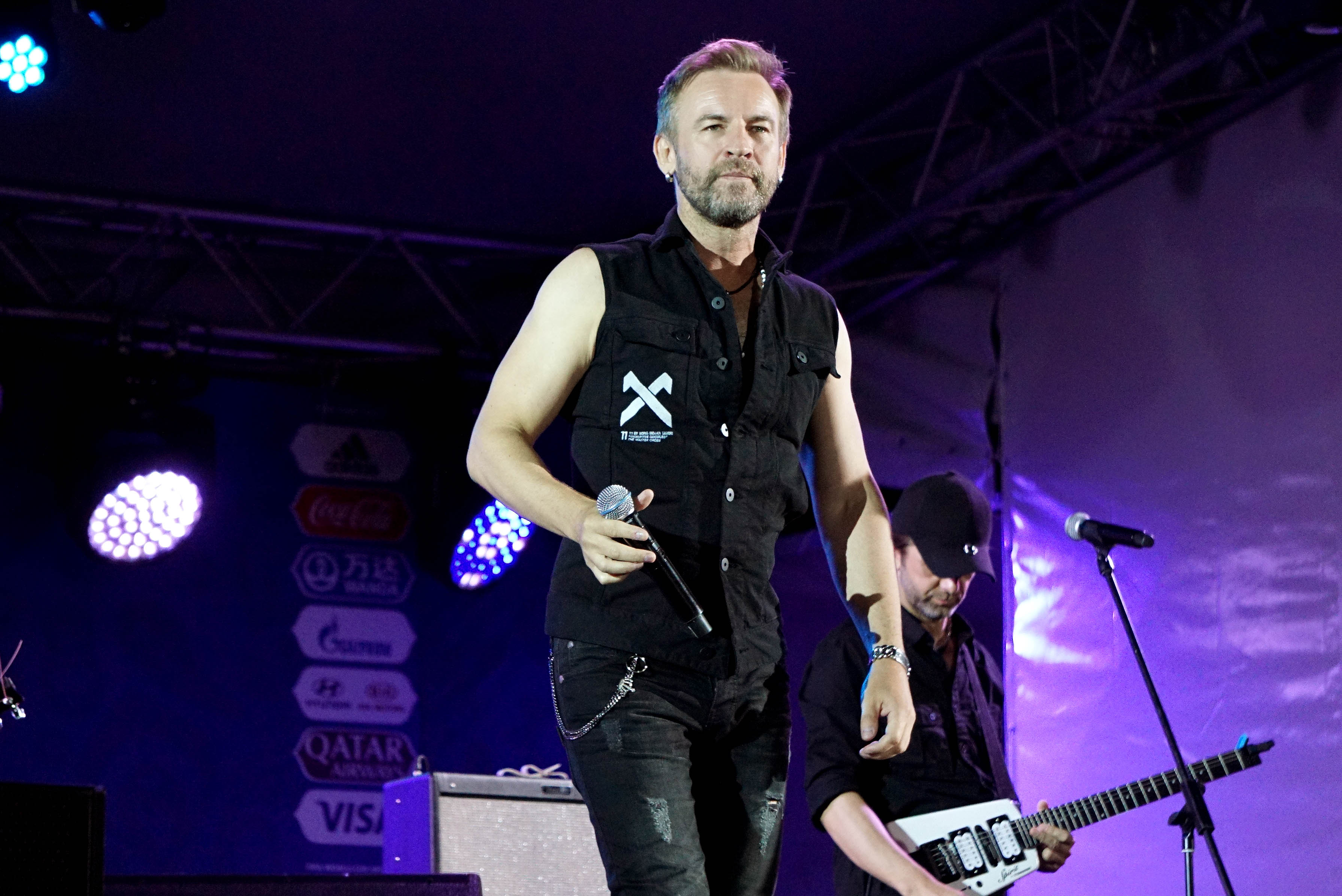
- (L-R) Lead Vocalist Roman Chernitsyn and Maxim Postelniy (guitar)

Background information
- Origin: Volgograd, Russia
- Genres: Pop, Synthpop, Electro-pop, Eurodance
- Years active: 1990–1999 (as Slow Motion); 1999–present (as Plazma)
- Members: Roman Chernitsyn; Maxim Postelniy
- Website: plazma.ru

Plazma (previously known as Slow Motion) is a Russian pop band consisting of Roman Chernitsyn (vocals, lyrics, music) and Maxim Postelniy (background vocals, keyboards, music and arrangements). The band was one of the first Russian pop band to produce its songs exclusively in English for a Russian-speaking audience.

Their first two albums, Take My Love (Plazma album) and 607 (album), put the band on top of the Russian charts. The third album, Black and White (Plazma album), was released in 2006. In December 2017, Plazma released their fourth studio album — Indian Summer (Plazma album).

The band participated in Russian national selection for Eurovision Song Contest three times: in 2007 with the song "Living In The Past", in 2009 with the song "Never Ending Story", and in 2010 with the song "Mystery (The Power Within)".

== Albums ==
As Slow Motion

- 1991: Falling in Love
- 1999: Prologue

As Plazma

- 2000: Take My Love (Plazma album)
- 2002: 607 (album)
- 2006: Black and White (Plazma album)
- 2017: Indian Summer (Plazma album)

== Singles ==
- 2000: Take My Love
- 2000: Jump in My Car
- 2000: The Sweetest Surrender
- 2001: Fading like a Rose
- 2001: Lonely
- 2002: You'll Never Meet an Angel
- 2003: You Know (My Recent Disease)
- 2003: A Bit of Perfection
- 2003: The Power of Your Spell
- 2004: Never Again
- 2004: Lonely II
- 2005: One of a Kind
- 2005: One Life
- 2006: Save
- 2006: Black Would Be White
- 2007: I Never Dreamed (That You'd Love Me)
- 2008: Living in the Past
- 2009: Never Ending Story
- 2009: The Real Song
- 2010: Mystery (The Power Within)
- 2011: Angel of Snow
- 2013: Black Leather Boys
- 2014: Lucky Rider
- 2015: Tame Your Ghosts
- 2017: Later (promo single)
- 2017: Dangerous (promo single)
- 2017: Indian Summer (promo single)
- 2017: Up In the Wind (promo single)
- 2017: Brilliant Water (promo single)
- 2018: Rescue Me (feat. Mish)
- 2019: I Believe in Love
- 2019: Salvation
- 2020: Freedom Is Finally Mine

== Videos ==
- The music video was filmed in October 1990 and had its first television premiere in 1991 in Volgograd, Russia. But on the Internet it was officially premiered only 29 years later, on 26 June 2020 on the Slow Motion and Plazma official pages at VKontakte: Hungry for Love (as Slow Motion)
- 2000: Take My Love
- 2000: The Sweetest Surrender
- 2001: Lonely
- 2002: You'll Never Meet an Angel
- 2003: A Bit of Perfection
- 2004: Lonely II
- 2005: One Life
- 2010: Mystery (The Power Within)
- 2016: Tame Your Ghosts
- 2019: I Believe in Love
