= Never Let You Go (Dima Bilan song) =

Song by Dima Bilan

Single by Dima Bilan
- Released: June 2006
- Recorded: 2005
- Genre: Pop
- Length: 3:06
- Songwriters: Dima Bilan; Karen Kavaleryan; Irina Antonyan

Dima Bilan singles chronology
"Not That Simple" (2005)	"Never Let You Go" (2006)	"Lady Flame" (2006)

Eurovision Song Contest 2006 entry
- Country: Russia
- Artist: Dima Bilan
- Language: English
- Composer: Alexandr Lunyov
- Lyricists: Karen Kavaleryan; Irina Antonyan

Finals performance
- Semi-final result: 3rd
- Semi-final points: 217
- Final result: 2nd
- Final points: 248

Entry chronology
- ◄ "Nobody Hurt No One" (2005)
- "Song #1" (2007) ►

"Never Let You Go" is a song by Dima Bilan. It represented Russia in the Eurovision Song Contest 2006, ending up in 2nd place.

At the performance in Athens, Dima Bilan wears a white tank top with a number representing his place in the contest's running order – 13 in the semi-final and 10 in the final. Bilan was surrounded by two ballerinas dancing in the background and a white piano covered in red rose petals, from which a ghost-like female figure emerged halfway through the song.

On the night of the semi-final the song was performed 13th, following Poland's Ich Troje with "Follow My Heart" and preceding Turkey's Sibel Tüzün with "Süper Star". The song received 217 points, placing 3rd in a field of 23 and proceeding to the final.

On the night of the final Bilan performed 10th in the running order, following Denmark's Sidsel Ben Semmane with "Twist of Love" and preceding Macedonia's Elena Risteska with "Ninanajna". The song received 248 points, finishing second behind Finland's Lordi with "Hard Rock Hallelujah".

This was Russia's best showing at Eurovision up to that time. He beat Alsou, who also came 2nd in the Eurovision Song Contest 2000, but by only 155 points. Since the introduction of the semi-final in 2004, more countries are participating and voting in the contest, thus increasing the possible amount of scores a song can receive: in 2006, there were 38 nations taking part (Serbia and Montenegro pulled out of performing, but still voted), as opposed to 24 in 2000. Nevertheless, Alsou received 53.8% of the maximum possible points from 24 countries in 2000, whilst Bilan's final tally equated to 54.4% of the maximum possible score available from the 38 voting countries.

The song was succeeded as Russian representative by Serebro with "Song #1".

Dima Bilan performed the song at the World Music Awards in Earls Court on 15 November 2006.

== Charts ==
=== Weekly charts ===
Chart (2006)	Peak position
CIS Airplay (TopHit)	3
Greece (IFPI Greece)	8
Russia Airplay (TopHit)	4

=== Year-end charts ===
Chart (2006)	Position
CIS (Tophit)	14
Russia Airplay (TopHit)	18

=== Decade-end charts ===
Decade-end chart performance for "Never Let You Go"
Chart (2000–2009)	Position
Russia Airplay (TopHit)	170
