= Marina Lizorkina =

Russian singer (born 1983)

Marina Lizorkina Марина Лизоркина
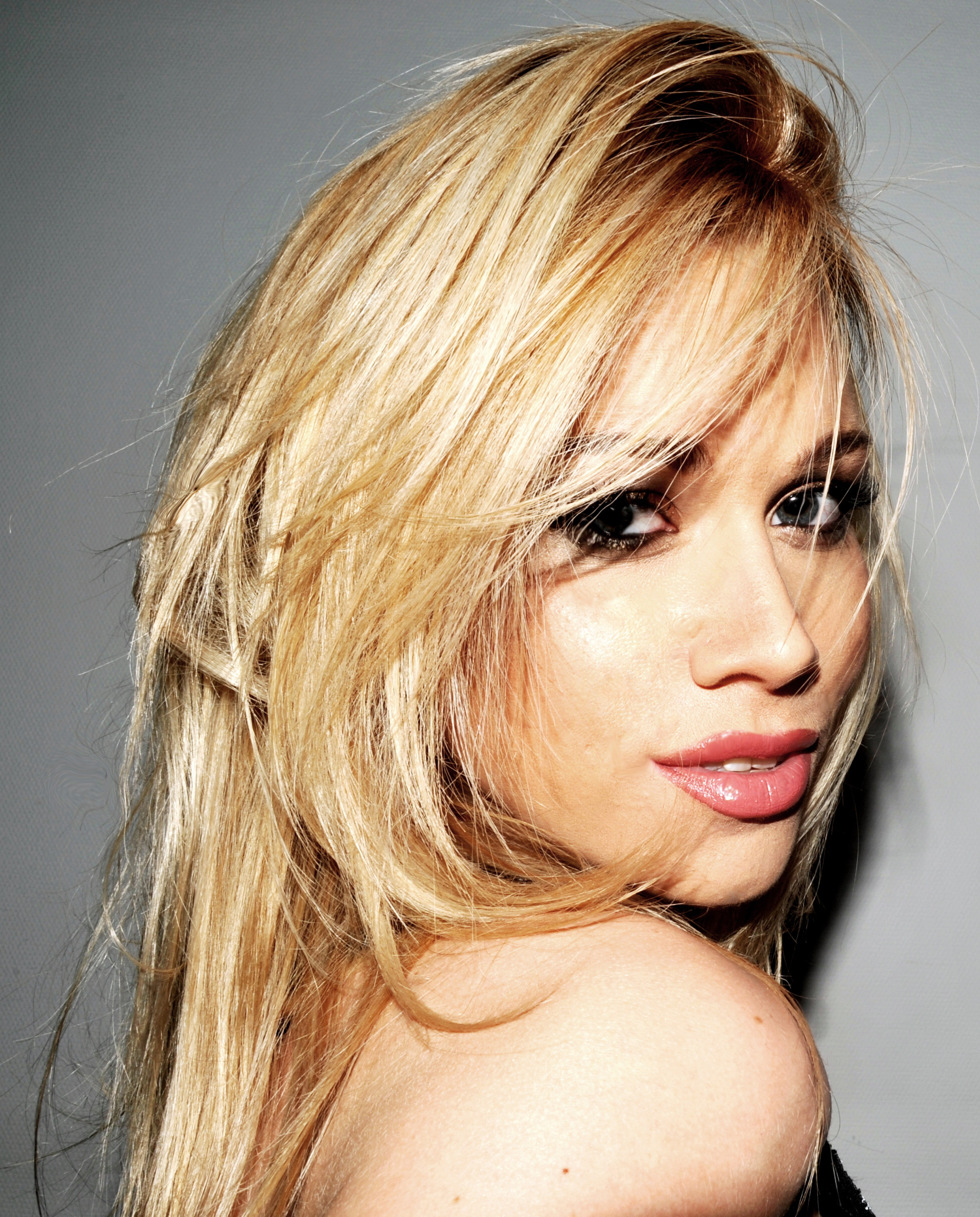

Background information
- Born: Marina Sergeevna Lizorkina (Марина Сергеевна Лизоркина); 9 June 1983 (age 43); Moscow, RSFSR, Soviet Union
- Genres: Pop, Europop, pop rock
- Occupations: Singer, dancer
- Instrument: Vocals
- Years active: 2004–present
- Label: Monolit Records

Marina Sergeevna Lizorkina (Russian: Марина Серге́евна Лизоркина; born 9 June 1983) is a Russian singer and former member of girl group Serebro which she left in 2009.

== Biography ==
=== Early career ===
At the age of 16, she entered the Contemporary Art University in Moscow. She plays the piano, the guitar and the xylophone.

Marina used to sing in a choir, before she became the lead singer of the group "Formula". In 2004, they released a few singles for the series Obrechonnaya Stat Zvezdoy.

=== Serebro ===
Marina was the last one to join the group. She saw an internet announcement, where they were looking for a singer and took the chance. Her application was noticed, and later she joined the group. With Serebro, Lizorkina took part in the Eurovision Song Contest 2007 and placed the third. They also released four No. 1 hits in Russia and the album Opiumroz in 2009.

On 18 June 2009, it was announced that Marina Lizorkina had left the band, for both financial and personal reasons, and was replaced by Anastasia Karpova. It was rumoured Lizorkina left the band due to pregnancy, but her former bandmate Olga Seryabkina denied those rumours.

After she left the band, she became an artist. For this moment she exhibits in Russia, Europe and the United States

== Personal life ==
Marina loves driving herself, describing it as a passion. She's also very fond of animals and loves to draw oil paintings. She once said: "I love painting in oil. The main characters are mostly humanoids from other worlds. But I must say that my drawings make very strange impression on people. Each and everyone finds something different in them – and that is great."

Marina is fluent in Russian, English, and Spanish. She is also a fan of football and once stated that she was very happy because Russia played in the semi-finals of UEFA Euro 2008.

== Discography ==
=== With Formula ===
==== Albums ====
- 2004: Obrechonnaya Stat Zvezdoy soundtrack

==== Singles ====
- 2004: "Parahod"
- 2004: "Na pol Chasa"
- 2004: "Leto"

=== With Serebro ===
Preceded by Dima Bilan with "Never Let You Go"	Russia in the Eurovision Song Contest; 2007 (as part of Serebro)	Succeeded by Dima Bilan with "Believe"
