= Serebro =

Russian girl group

Serebro Серебро
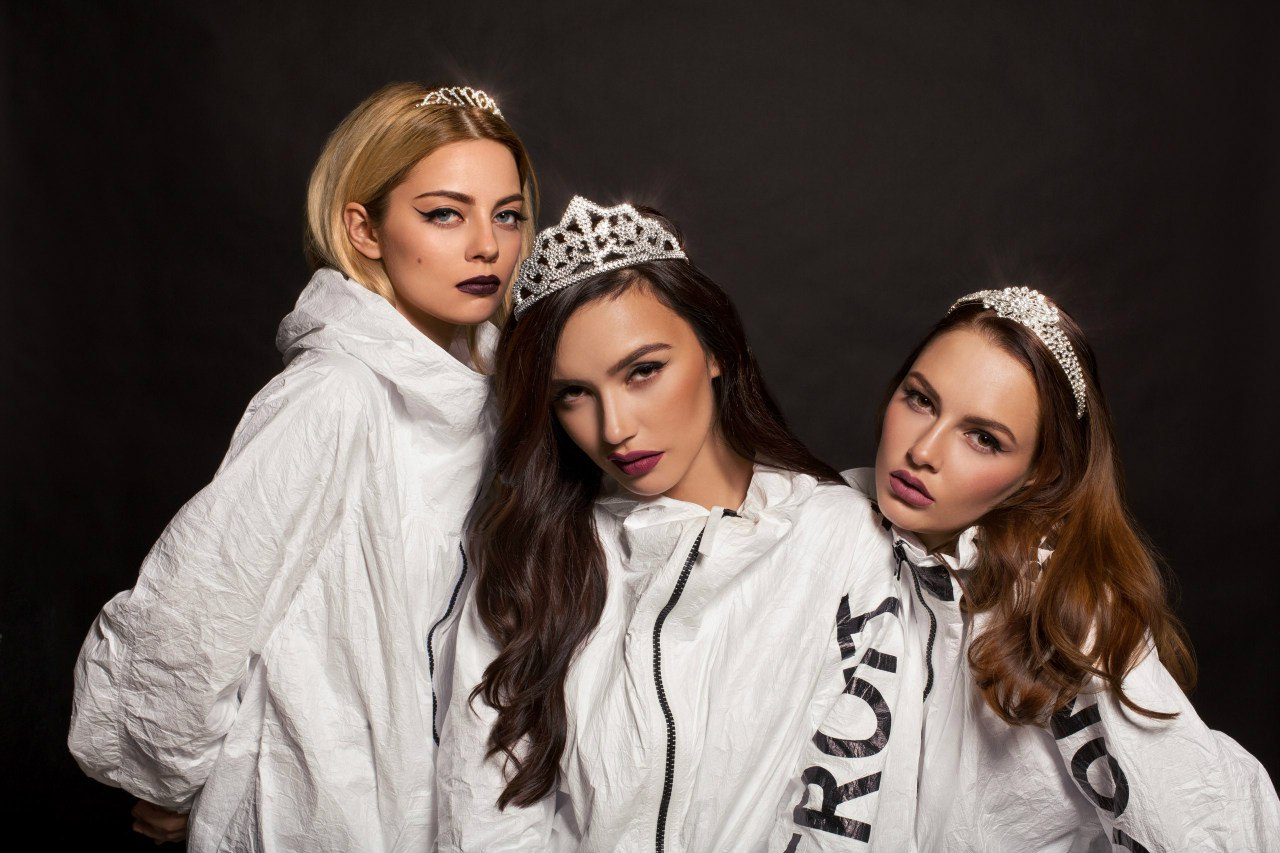
- Serebro in 2016 (L–R): Katya Kischuk, Olga Seryabkina, Polina Favorskaya

Background information
- Origin: Moscow, Russia
- Genre: Europop
- Years active: 2006–2019, 2024–present
- Labels: Monolit Records; Ego; Malfa; Republic; EMI (Japan); Universal (Japan); Warner (Indonesia)
- Members: Aigul "Aya" Valiulina; Diana "Di" Rak; Daria "Keiko" Kuznetsova
- Past members: Marina Lizorkina; Elena Temnikova; Olga Seryabkina; Anastasia Karpova; Dasha Shashina; Polina Favorskaya; Katya Kischuk; Tatiana Morgunova; Irina Titova; Elizaveta Kornilova; Marianna Kochurova

Serebro (Russian: Серебро, IPA: [sʲɪrʲɪˈbro] , lit. 'Silver'; stylized in all caps) is a Russian girl group formed by their manager and producer Maxim Fadeev. Serebro was formed in 2006, consisting of Marina Lizorkina, Olga Seryabkina, and Elena Temnikova as a submitted proposal for consideration by Channel One Russia for the Eurovision Song Contest 2007. Serebro was selected to represent Russia at the 2007 Contest with the song titled "Song #1". They subsequently placed third at the contest, scoring a total of 207 points. Serebro was then officially signed to Fadeev's record label Monolit Records, and in 2012, the group had additional releases produced by Sony Music Entertainment and Ego Music. In 2009, Lizorkina announced her departure from the group, and was subsequently replaced by Anastasia Karpova. Karpova left the group in 2013 and was replaced by Dasha Shashina, who left in 2016. Temnikova left the group in 2014 for health reasons, and was replaced by Polina Favorskaya, who in turn left the group in 2017 and was replaced by Tatiana Morgunova. In 2019, the line-up Olga Seryabkina, Katya Kischuk, and Tatiana Morgunova, the last one to include the last original member, had been replaced by Elizaveta Kornilova, Marianna Kochurova and Irina Titova. The group had been disbanded up until 2024. In November 2024, the new SEREBRO members had been debuted: Aigul "Aya" Valiulina, Diana "Di" Rak and Daria "Keiko" Kuznetsova.

With Lizorkina at the time, the band recorded their debut studio album OpiumRoz. The album received critical acclaim and spawned other singles in addition to "Song #1", but it never became a commercial success. The band's second album, called Mama Lover, proved to be much more successful. It included the massive hit of the same name and went double platinum in Russia. The eponymous "Mama Lover" hit single received media attention worldwide, with reviewers commenting on both the raunchy music video and the song itself. The music video for the song received more than 20 million views on YouTube and became the subject of more than 250 parodies. After the success of "Mama Lover", the group began to garner commercial attention around the world. The group re-released Mama Lover in Japan (under the name Serebration) after signing a contract with EMI Music. Their first international single under Ego Music and Universal Music Group, "Mi Mi Mi", became a success on European music charts.

After their musical and image development, the group became known for a very sexually charged and over the top style. Some of their music videos have led to controversy in the media, including "Mama Lover" and "Mi Mi Mi".

== History ==
=== Formation and Eurovision Song Contest 2007 ===
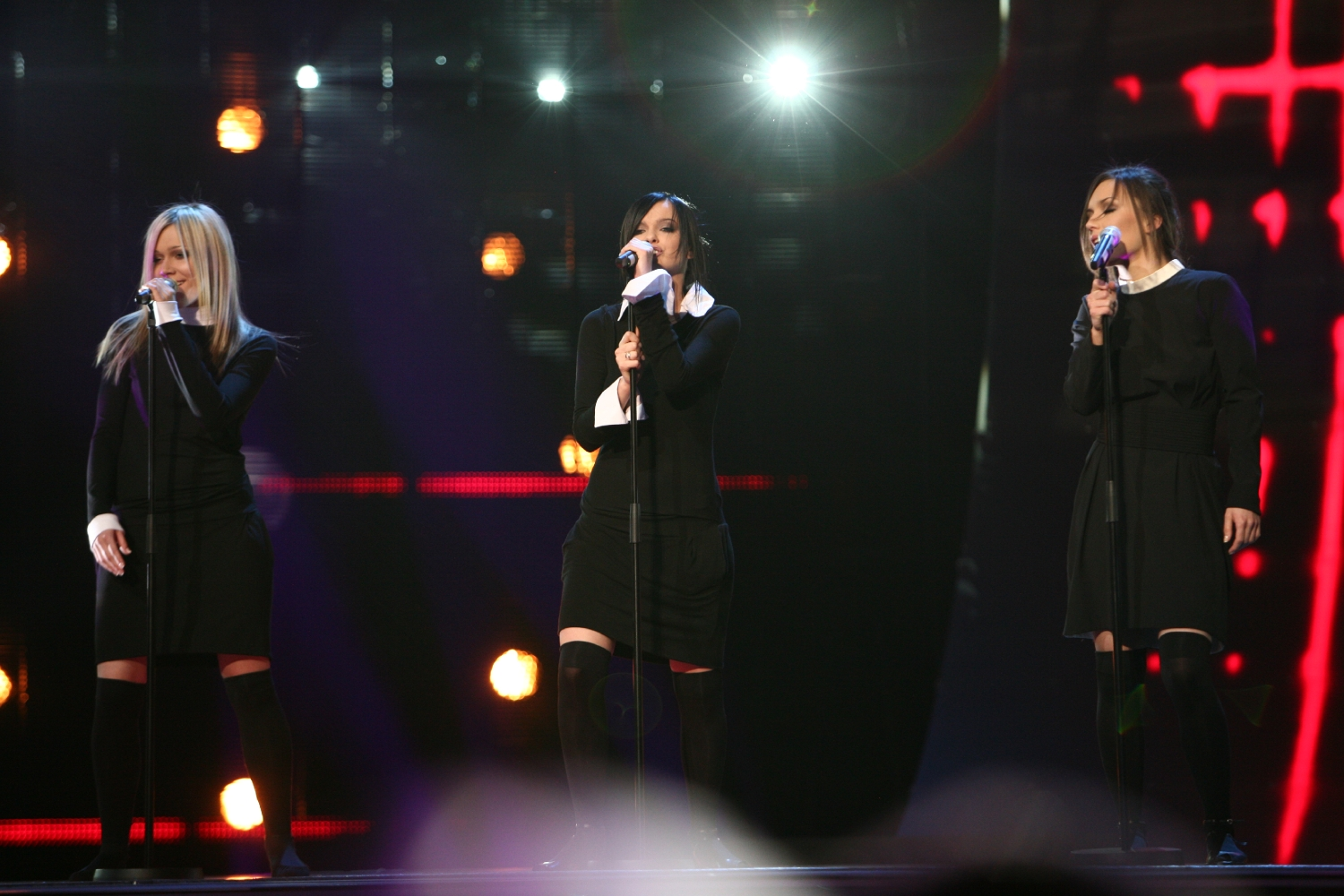
Serebro performs "Song #1" at the Eurovision Song Contest 2007 in Helsinki.

In early 2007, producer Maxim Fadeev began preparing a concept for a new band titled Serebro. The concept began as a proposal for Channel One Russia for a new Russian entry into the Eurovision Song Contest 2007. Despite original indications that the concept was for a solo singer, it morphed into a group around the former Star Factory participant Elena Temnikova who was paired with two newcomers: Marina Lizorkina and Olga Seryabkina. On 8 March 2007, the expert panel at Channel One Russia selected Serebro and the song "Song #1" as Russia's entry to the 2007 Eurovision Song Contest.

=== 2007—2008: Debut and OpiumRoz ===
Soon after the Eurovision contest, Serebro released "Song #1" as a single CD, which contained 13 different versions of "Song #1" marked by colours, as well as an extended version of the video. The girls then released a Russian version of "Song #1", called "Песня #1".

At the MTV RMA 2007 Awards, Serebro performed a new song titled "What's Your Problem?". In December 2007, Serebro won another award at the Russian Grammies. Serebro also won a World Music Award in 2007 as the best selling Russian artist. Unlike previous eastern European winners of a World Music Award (e.g. Ruslana from Ukraine in 2004 and Dima Bilan for Russia in 2006), Serebro did not perform at the event.

In late February, Serebro performed "Zhuravli" on Zvezda, a television programme in Russia, featuring artists singing patriotic songs.

In 2008, the group continued their work on their first album, OpiumRoz, which had a projected release date of 17 October. However, there was a delay in the release of their debut album as there were some problems in the track list. In November, the girls released the new song, "Skazhi, ne Molchi" ("Say, Don't be silent"). The song did not achieve worldwide success, but managed to score the top spots in their native Russia. A music video was also aired for the single not long after its final release. In November 2008, Serebro was awarded by MTV RMA Awards for the Best Group. After a number of delays with their debut album, OpiumRoz, it was finally released on 25 April 2009, and was presented at the band's concert on Poklonnaya Hill. Serebro was supported by other musicians, including Russian entrant to the Eurovision Song Contest 2004 Yulia Savicheva; OpiumRoz was the result of two years recording. Positive reactions came from both critics and the public alike. The album, however, did not chart anywhere and failed to make an impact on record charts.

=== 2009—2012: Line-up change, experimental works and Mama Lover ===
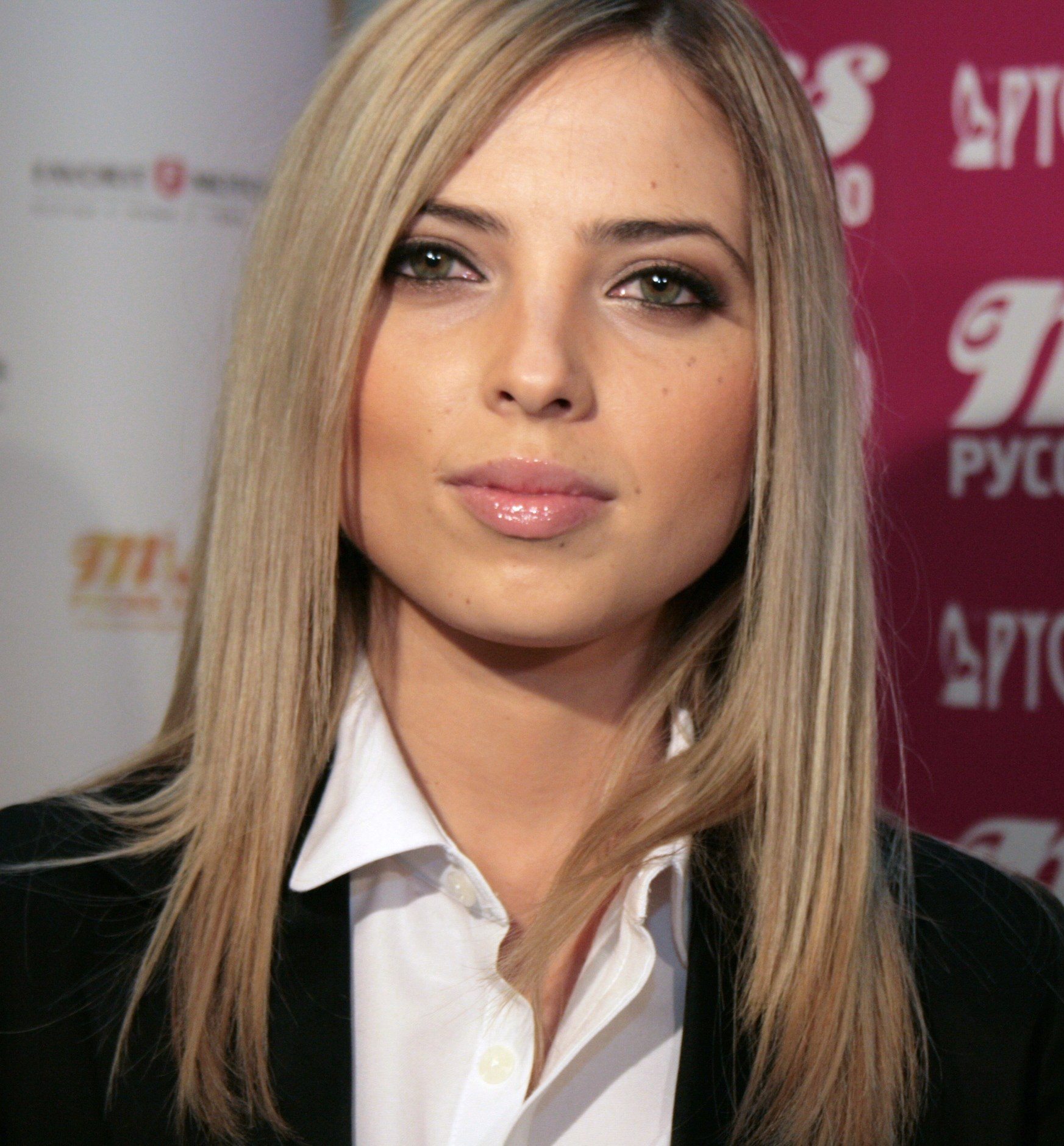
Anastasia Karpova (inset), replaced Lizorkina for personal and financial reasons.

On 18 June 2009, it was announced that Marina Lizorkina had left the band, due to both financial and personal reasons. Many reports around Russia reported that Lizorkina had left due to a recent pregnancy, but bandmate Olga denied these reports. Lizorkina was replaced by Anastasia Karpova. On 24 June 2009, Serebro announced they had finished work on their new music video for their fifth single "Сладко" (English: Sweet) which was released in Russian as well as in English under the title "Like Mary Warner". This single is not featured on the band's debut album and is the first single to feature the work of the latest Serebro member, Anastasia Karpova. Serebro participated in the New Wave Festival in Jūrmala, Latvia, on 29 July 2009 with their song "Skazhi, ne Molchi" and a cover version of "Get the Party Started" by Pink.

On 29 March 2010, Serebro's official website invited women between the ages of 18 and 30 with a "non-standard appearance (piercings, dreadlocks, braids, tattoos, vivid hair color, etc.)" to send in applications to feature in their new video and are invited to do so until 3 April 2010 in preparation for the filming of a new music video which began on 4 April 2010. The title of the song was revealed to be "No Time" and was released to radio airplay in Russia on 13 April 2010.

On 26 September 2010, the group held their first solo concert in Prague, Czech Republic. The group then toured the Czech Republic and present gifts to children who reside in social rehabilitation centres.

On 30 July 2011, Serebro premiered their eighth single, Mama Lover on Europa Plus Live. It is their third official English language release after Song #1 and Like Mary Warner. On 15 September 2011, the music video for Mama Luba (Russian version of "Mama Lover") was released. After the release of their single Mama Lover, media attention across Europe and other countries was piqued by the single. It became the group's first single to chart in different countries outside the Russian Federation, including Spain, Italy, Belgium and the Czech Republic. According to media outlets, more than 250 parodies of Serebro's music video for the single were uploaded to YouTube alone. The reaction made "Mama Lover" Serebro's most successful single to date and some media sources suggested the group was poised to capture markets beyond Russia. The song was certified Platinum in Italy, selling over 30,000 copies.

On 14 June 2012, Serebro released their second studio album Mama Lover on their label. The album was released in Russia, and was also slated for a European release. The fourth single from the album was Malchik, which was released on 16 June 2012. The single was unsuccessful for the group, peaking at 124 on the Russian Singles Chart and ended Serebro's run of consecutive top ten hits. Still, the album sold well and Mama Lover was later certified double platinum in Russia, selling more than 300,000 copies.

=== 2013–2015: New record label, new music projects and Karpova/Temnikova's Departure ===
After the decline of their success after "Mama Lover", the group started to record songs for their third studio album. In January 2013, the group announced that they would release their further material in Japan after signing with EMI Music. They also announced that they plan to release a compilation entitled Serebration that includes songs from their first and second studio albums. The group traveled to Japan to promote the compilation album and to do a live concert tour.

In March 2013, the group released their promotional single "Sexy Ass", but it failed to chart in Russia. In June 2013, the group released their single "Mi Mi Mi" which charted in Italy, peaking at 5 on the Italian iTunes chart. In July 2013, the group released the song "Malo Tebya". The song was released on Russian radio airplay on 10 July and marked a welcome return to the top ten in Russia for the band, ultimately peaking at number five. A new collaboration with DJ M.E.G., entitled "Угар" (Ugar), has premiered on the band's Facebook page and the Promo DJ website on 18 September. The group announced that they signed a deal with Republic Records and Universal Music Group and discussed plans to re-release their single "Mi Mi Mi" as their first international single.

On 28 September, member Karpova confirmed her planned departure from the group. Karpova had told Fadeev months prior that she intended to leave the group. She noted that the decision was mutual with other members of the band and that her primary motivation was to pursue a solo career. A new member, named Dasha Shashina, was announced on 3 October 2013. Shashina had re-recorded Anastasia's recordings in the group's songs "Malo Tebya" and "Ugar", which is expected to release a video with Shashina featuring in it.

Temnikova left the group in May 2014, ahead of her planned December exit, after having become pregnant. Karpova temporarily returned until newest member Polina Favorskaya was introduced on 5 June 2014.

Serebro's 3rd studio album '925' was supposed to be released on iTunes Russia on 15 October 2015 but due to their studio hard drive being stolen, the album release had to be cancelled.

=== 2016–2020: Sila tryokh, Seryabkina's departure, full reformation and disbandment ===
On 1 May 2016, Shashina left the group due to serious health issues and having to undergo two surgeries, and was replaced by Katya Kischuk.

On 26 April 2016, it was announced that the album '925' was renamed Sila Tryokh (The Power of Three) and was put up on the Russian iTunes for pre-order and a release date for 27 May.

On 2 June 2016, Serebro announced on their Facebook that a new single titled "Slomana" (Broken), which was released on 6 June 2016.

On 25 August 2016, Serebro announced a new single called "Serdtse patsanki" (Tomboy's Heart), which is a soundtrack for the movie PATSANKI, and on 5 September 2016, Serebro premiered the full version of the song. Favorskaya announced she'd be leaving the group in August 2017, and an open casting was announced to find her replacement. The three finalists from the open casting were later revealed to be Anastasia Gribkhova, Tatiana Morgunova, and Anastasia Popova. Following several stages of auditions, Morgunova was announced as Favorskaya's replacement in November 2017. They performed live shows as a quartet until the end of 2017.

In October 2018, Seryabkina revealed that she'd be leaving Serebro in the beginning of 2019 in order to prioritize her solo career. Seryabkina was the only remaining original member of the group. The following month an open casting was announced for three new soloists, with Kischuk and Morgunova revealing that they would be leaving the group as well with Seryabkina.

On 30 October 2019, Fadeev announced that he terminated the contracts with all artists of the MALFA label. He noted that the performers received copyright for all content free of charge. The exception is two artists with whom litigation is ongoing. According to Fadeev, this is the most dramatic change in the entire existence of MALFA.

On 31 October 2019, Fadeev revealed in an interview that all of the songs under the Serebro name have been given to Seryabkina. Although Seryabkina was also released with all the artists the day prior, Serebro itself is still a global brand he controls, and Fadeev will be thinking about how he will approach using the brand while keeping the popularity that it had when Seryabkina was a member.

On 7 June 2020, Fadeev confirmed the band’s disbandment through an Instagram comment: " «Серебро» не будет никогда! Для меня это самые болезненные и мерзкие воспоминания! Будет, что то другое! " / " "Serebro" will never be! For me, these are the most painful and vile memories! There will be something else!"

=== 2024: 11, new single and new line-up revealed ===
On 19 July 2024, it was announced via Serebro's official Instagram account that a compilation album titled 11, which would include almost all of the group's past singles and four previously unreleased tracks, would be released that same day at midnight time.

On 18 November 2024, Serebro announced the upcoming release of a new single titled "Song #2", which would be released on 29 November 2024. An accompanying music video for the song was also released, revealing the new line-up of the group comprising Aigul "Aya" Valiulina, Diana "Di" Rak and Daria "Keiko" Kuznetsova. Serebro performed "Song #2" at the 2024 Golden Gramophone Awards on 12 December 2024, thus marking the new line-up's debut performance.

On 13 December 2024, the group announced the upcoming release of an EP, which would include remix versions of the group's past singles and different versions of their current single, Song #2. Fadeev had also made reference to this on his Instagram account prior to this, dating back to 5 December 2024.

On the 19 December 2024, the band showcased previews of the EP titled LUML, set to be released the following day. LUML is an Abbreviation of "Let Us Make Love", a lyric taken from the single track. On the 20 Dec 2024, LUML was released.

On 24 January 2025, Serebro released their single "Надоело (105)" (Nadoelo). The track was written by Kuznetsova and Fadeev. Fadeev took to his Instagram and posted a video talking about the song. He stated that the song had been written almost 15 years beforehand, dating back as far as 2010. Which would be four years after the band had formed. Fadeev claimed that himself and Serebro had constantly wanted to release it, but postponed it. He stated that for some reason, they always had reasons as to why the track was left on hold. However, upon revival of the band and after learning that Kuznetsova could write songs, he allowed her to work on the lyrics. Which he claimed were “wonderful”. Fadeev took note that a lot of the fans claimed the song sounded too much like the old Serebro, in particular - the track ‘"В космосе" (In Space). He claimed that the intention was to sound like the old Serebro, so that fans could recognise the revival of the band. He also stated that the band was “Experimental”, as Serebro had always been.

The official music video for Надоело (105) was released on 19 March 2025. On 11 April 2025, a second Music video was released for the track, with a different theme and under the title: ‘Надоело (105) [Предел]’

== Members ==
=== Timeline ===
- Elena Temnikova (Russian: Елена Темникова, born 18 April 1985 in Kurgan, Russia) came to media prominence as a contestant on the Channel One talent show Star Factory in 2003. She was spotted by Maxim Fadeev, the main producer of Star Factory, and signed to his recording company Monolit Records. Although Temnikova released two disco singles, "Begi" and "Taina", she did not continue her solo career and joined Serebro instead. She married co-member of Star Factory Alexey Semenov; the two separated in 2007, before a settlement for divorce. She then had a brief conflict with Fedeev, after dating and subsequently leaving his brother. She currently resides in Moscow, Russia. On 15 May 2014 the official Serebro website reported that Temnikova had left the group due to ill health. She was replaced with Karpova who had left the band earlier the previous year until they find a replacement.
- Olga Seryabkina (Russian: Ольга Серябкина, born 12 April 1985 in Moscow, Russia) began to study ballet at the age of seven. She was awarded the rank of "Master of Sports Candidate". She took part in many international dancing competitions. Seryabkina graduated from the Department for Estrada and Pop Singing at the Art School, and in 2006 graduated from university with a degree in "Translation and Entrepreneurship". She was brought in to audition for Serebro by her friend Temnikova. In addition to performing, Seryabkina also contributed to producing and writing a number of the group's songs. She first contributed as a writer on the group's single "Like Mary Warner", and also wrote and composed some of the songs featured on Mama Lover. She left the group in the beginning of 2019 to focus on her solo career.
- Marina Lizorkina (Russian: Марина Лизоркина, born 9 June 1983 in Moscow, Russia) entered the Contemporary Art University in Moscow at the age of sixteen. She used to sing in a choir, before she became the lead singer of the group "Formula". In 2004, they released a few singles for the series Obrechennaya Stat Zvezdoy. Lizorkina was the last to join Serebro, after she saw an Internet announcement.
- Anastasia Karpova (Russian: Анастасия Карпова, born 2 November 1984 in Balakovo, Russia) was very interested in music since her early age, but dedicated herself to ballet. She was also attending singing classes and decided to pursue her singing career. Anastasia had replaced Lizorkina, after the latter announced her departure. She first had her debut with the group on their single "Like Mary Warner". Karpova, along with Temnikova and Seryabkina had recorded their second studio album Mama Lover, making it Karpova's first full-length studio album. Karpova decided to leave the group to pursue a solo career. The song "УГАР" was her last song with the group.
- Daria "Dasha" Shashina (Russian: Даша Шашина, born 1 September 1990 in Nizhny Novgorod, Russia) is the replacement of Karpova, who began performing with the group in October 2013. Shashina left the group in March 2016 due to serious health issues and having to undergo two surgeries.
- Polina Favorskaya (Russian: Полина Фаворская, born 21 November 1991 in Volgograd, Russia) was the replacement of Temnikova, who was introduced 5 June 2014. Favorskaya announced she was leaving the group in August 2017, but continued performing with them until the end of 2017.
- Katya Kischuk (Russian: Катя Кищук, born 13 December 1993 in Tula, Russia) was introduced in April 2016 to replace Shashina. She left the group in the beginning of 2019.
- Tatiana Morgunova "Tanya Tekis" (Russian: Татьяна Моргунова; born 25 January 1998 in Aktobe, Kazakhstan) was introduced in November 2017 to replace Favorskaya. She was cast following an open casting process. She left the group in the beginning of 2019.
- Irina Titova (Russian: Ирина Титова; born 22 January 1997 in Tashkent, Uzbekistan) was introduced in 2019 following the complete reformation of the group. She was born in Tashkent, lived in Belgium, and then moved to Russia.
- Elizaveta Kornilova (Russian: Елизавета Корнилова; born 22 June 2000) was introduced in 2019 following the complete reformation of the group.
- Marianna Kochurova (Russian: Марианна Кочурова; born 6 July 1996 in Saint Petersburg, Russia) was introduced in 2019 following the complete reformation of the group.
- Daria "Keiko" Sergeevna Kuznetsova (Russian: Дарья Сергеевна Кузнецова; born 29 July 2004) was introduced in 2024 following the comeback of the group after being disbanded since 2019. Kuznetsova had released her first solo single in 2022 titled “Однолюб”, followed up by “Без повода” (2023) and “Скажи мне правду” (2024) (the later 2 singles being made unavailable on streaming platforms). She had been selected as the third member of the lineup, as Valiulina and Rak were tasked to find a third soloist for the group and had contacted Kuznetsova through social media direct messages.
- Aygul "Aya" Enverovna Valiulina (Russian: Айгуль Энверовна Валиулина; born 23 September 2000) was introduced in 2024 following the comeback of the group after being disbanded since 2019.
- Diana "Di" Yurevna Rak (Russian: Диана Юрьевна Рак; born 22 April 2001) was introduced in 2024 following the comeback of the group after being disbanded since 2019.

== Artistry ==
=== Musical style ===
Serebro's sound is primarily described as Europop. One review for their EP Izbrannoe suggested that the group was a successor to t.A.T.u and VIA Gra. On their first studio album, OpiumRoz, the group featured a more alternative rock style of music that incorporated other genres including dance-pop, grunge, punk rock and pop rock.

== Awards ==
Year	Organization	Award	Result
2007	MTV RMA Awards	Best Pop Project	Nominated
2007	MTV RMA Awards	Best Song	Nominated
2007	MTV RMA Awards	Best Debut	Won
2007	Muz-TV Awards	New Act	Nominated
2007	Golden Grammophone Awards		Won
2007	World Music Award	Best-selling Russian Artist	Won
2008	MTV RMA Awards	Best Video	Nominated
2008	MTV RMA Awards	Best Group	Won
2009	Muz-TV Awards	Best Video	Nominated
2009	Muz-TV Awards	Best Pop-Group	Nominated
2009	Thee God of Ether	Radio Hit Group	Won
2010	MTV Europe Music Awards 2010	Best Russian Act	Nominated
2012	MTV Europe Music Awards 2012	Best Russian Act	Nominated
2015	Russian National Music Awards	Best Pop Group	Won
2017	Russian National Music Awards	Best Pop Group	Nominated
2025	Жара Music Awards	Breakthrough of The Year	Won

Awards
World Music Awards
Preceded by 2006 Dima Bilan	Best-Selling Russian Artist; 2007; Serebro	Succeeded by 2008 Philipp Kirkorov

== Discography ==
- ОпиумRoz (2009)
- Mama Lover (2012)
- Сила трёх (2016)
- 11 (2024)

== Tours ==
- Tour (2007–09)
- Tour (2010–12)
- Tour (2013)

Awards and achievements
Preceded by Dima Bilan with "Never Let You Go"	Russia in the Eurovision Song Contest; 2007	Succeeded by Dima Bilan with "Believe"
