= Olga Seryabkina =

Russian singer-songwriter (born 1985)

Olga Seryabkina Ольга Серябкина
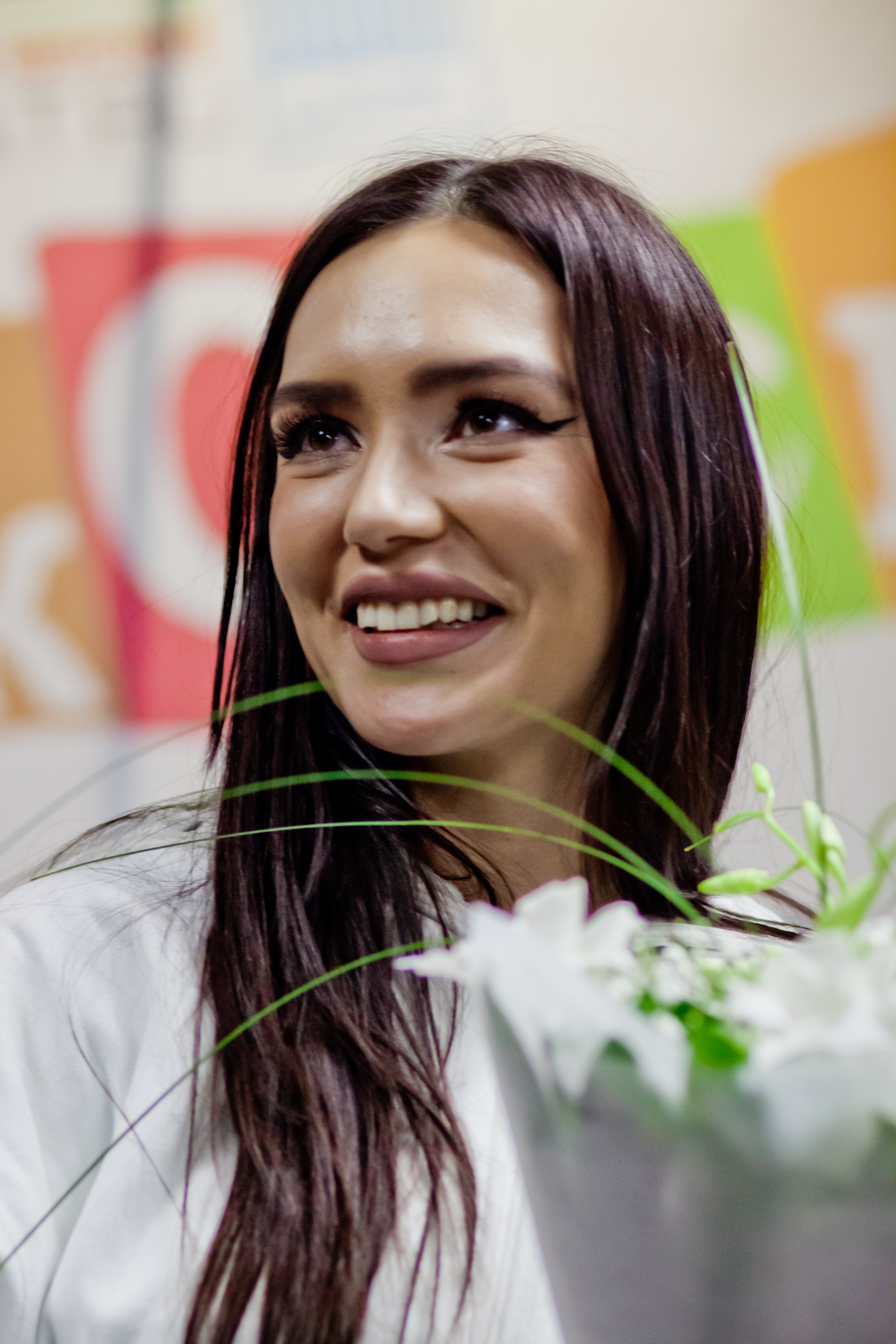
- Seryabkina in 2017

Background information
- Also known as: Molly; Holy Molly
- Born: Olga Yurievna Seryabkina; 12 April 1985 (age 41); Moscow, Russian SFSR, USSR
- Genre: Europop
- Occupations: Singer-songwriter; dancer
- Instrument: Vocals
- Years active: 2004–present
- Labels: Monolit Records; Malfa; Warner
- Formerly of: Serebro
- Website: seryabkina.com

Olga Yurievna Seryabkina (Russian: Ольга Юрьевна Серябкина; born 12 April 1985) is a Russian singer-songwriter. She is a former member of girl group Serebro, which won third place in the Eurovision Song Contest 2007, until 2019 when she confirmed that she would leave the group – the last of the original lineup to do so.

== Life and career ==
=== Early life and career (1985–2007) ===
At seven years old, Olga Seryabkina began studying ballet.

=== Serebro (2007–2019) ===
After that she joined Serebro. She was brought to the casting by her friend Elena Temnikova, who was already a band member. They took part in the Eurovision Song Contest 2007 and won 3rd place.

Today Serebro is one of the most popular Russian bands. In 2007 she started writing lyrics for the group. In October 2007, there were some rumors that Olga was leaving the band because it was said she had problems with the lead singer Elena Temnikova, but that wasn't true. Max Fadeev, the manager of the band, also said that the replacement for Olga had already been found, but Olga decided not to leave Serebro.

On 9 October 2018 Seryabkina (the only remaining member of the original line-up) announced via Instagram that she is leaving the group in 2019 to concentrate on her solo career.

=== Solo career (2014–present) ===
In 2014, under the pseudonym Holy Molly appeared on the single «Kill Me All Night Along» by DJ M.E.G. as a guest artist, and in 2015 under the same pseudonym she released her debut solo single of the same name. Shortening her pseudonym to Molly, Seryabkina continued to release singles. In February 2019, she left Serebro and in April of the same year released her debut studio album «Косатка в небе».

Since 2020 she has finished working with the label «MALFA» and works under her own name.

On April 22 2022 the album «Синий цвет твоей любви» was released, which included ten tracks, and a few hours after the release the album took first place in the top chart of Russia on iTunes.

On April 1 2025, she rebranded her stage name to "SERYABKINA".

== Other activities ==
On 8 August 2008 Olga participated in “The stars motor racing” in Yarkhoma Park. The other competitors were Iljya Zudin (from the band Dinamit), Marina Lizorkina (also a Serebro member), Star Factory-participants Lena Kukarskaya and Oleg Dobrynin, Maxim Postelnyj (from the band Plazma) and Sid Spirin (from the band Tarakany!) among others. A true excitement was displayed by the band Serebro only. They showed a real fighting capacity, for instance, Marina Lizorkina even had her motorcycle gloves with her. Lena Temnikova also came to the racing and actively supported her colleagues, but she didn't take part in the competition. Only three participants took part in the final motor-racing. It was a time trial without any obstacles, and Olga Seryabkina was the winner.

== Personal life ==
She graduated from an art school in Moscow and earned a higher education diploma in Specialization in Translation and Entrepreneurship from the ИМПЭ Institute. Seryabkina is fluent in Russian, English and German.

In June 2019, Seryabkina came out as bisexual in an interview with the Russian outlet Super, addressing rumors that she was in a relationship with Maxim Fadeev. She confirmed that she had instead been in a four-year relationship with her former bandmate Elena Temnikova during their time in Serebro, noting that the relationship was well known within their inner circle despite never being publicly announced.

In 2020, Seryabkina married 32-year-old Georgy Nachkebia in a private ceremony in a suburb of Vienna. According to the singer, Nachkebia works across various sectors, ranging from show business to high technology; the two had known each other for years, but grew close only after she left Maxim Fadeev's label. On 13 September 2021, she announced her pregnancy in an interview with Tatler Russia.

On 20 November 2021, Seryabkina gave birth to their son, Luca.

== Discography ==
Albums (as Molly)

- Косатка в небе (2019)

Albums (as Seryabkina)

- Синий цвет твоей любви (2022)

EPs (as Seryabkina)

- Причины (2020)
- Зимний (2022)
- Весна (2025)

=== Russian singles ===
As Seryabkina

Single	Year	Chart positions		Album
Single	Year	RU	UKR	Album
"Мы мечтали о сцене"	2015	—	—	Non-album singles
"Что же ты наделал"	2020	95	—	Non-album singles
"Что же ты наделал (Space Edit)"	2020	—	—	Non-album singles
"Под водой"	2020	—	—	Non-album singles
"Спутники"	2020	127	23	Причины
"Не стыдно"	2020	—	—	Non-album singles
"Flashback"	2020	—	—	Non-album singles
"Zodiac"	2020	—	—	Non-album singles
"это Love"	2021	304	—	Синий цвет твоей любви
"Преступление"	2021	—	—	Синий цвет твоей любви
"HOLODNO"	2021	—	—	Синий цвет твоей любви
"Синий цвет твоей любви"	2022	—	—	Синий цвет твоей любви
"Бывшие"	2022	183	—	Синий цвет твоей любви
"Дядя Гена"	2022	—	—	Non-album singles
"Эта зима"	2022	—	—	Зимний
"Одиночка"	2023	377	—	Non-album singles
"Не забыла"	2023	82	—	Non-album singles
"Свит дримс"	2023	163	—	Non-album singles
"Начнём всё сначала"	2023	—	—	Non-album singles
"Это по любви"	2024	465	—	Non-album singles
"Старший лейтенант"	2024	—	—	Non-album singles
"Бывало и лучше"	2024	485	—	Non-album singles
"Говорила я тебе"	2024	—	—	Non-album singles
"Весна"	2025	—	—	Весна
"Медляк с Олей"	2025	482	—	Весна
"2 процента"	2025	—	—	Non-album singles

As Molly

Single	Year	Chart positions			Album
Single	Year	RUS	UKR	CIS	Album
"Я просто люблю тебя"	2016	226	—	468	Косатка в небе
"Я просто люблю тебя" (Dance Version)	2017	—	—	291	Non-album singles
"Если ты меня не любишь" (featuring Egor Kreed)	2017	22	52	6	Косатка в небе
"Пьяная"	2017	—	—	—	Косатка в небе
"Потому что любовь"	2018	—	—	259	Косатка в небе
"Не плачу"	2019	135	—	127	Косатка в небе
"Красивый мальчик"	2019	434	—	—	Косатка в небе
"Опалённые солнцем"	2019	266	—	—	Non-album singles

=== English singles ===
As Molly

Single	Year	Chart positions	Album
Single	Year	RUS	Album
"Holy Molly"	2015	254	Non-album singles
"For Ma Ma"	2015	—	Non-album singles
"Zoom"	2015	—	Non-album singles
"Style"	2016	—	Non-album singles
"Fire"	2017	305	Non-album singles
"Backfire" (featuring Мaksim Svoboda)	2018	—	Non-album singles
"Under My Skin"	2018	—	Non-album singles

As Seryabkina

Single	Year	Album
"Pleasure" (with Cedric Gasaïda)	2021	Non-album single

=== Promotional singles ===
Single	Year	Chart positions	Album
Single	Year	RUS	Album
"Рассыпая серебро" (featuring Maxim Fadeev)	2018	—	Косатка в небе
"Красивый мальчик"	2019	437	Косатка в небе
"Опалённые солнцем"	2019	266	Non-album single
"Полуголые"	2019	—	Косатка в небе
"Не бойся"	2019	—	Косатка в небе
"Ты ничего не понял"	2020	—	Косатка в небе

=== Other charted songs ===
Single	Year	Chart positions	Album
Single	Year	RUS	Album
"Набери мой номер"	2019	52	Косатка в небе

=== Features ===
Single	Year	Chart positions	Album
Single	Year	RUS	Album
"Kill Me All Night Long" (featuring DJ M.E.G.)	2014	—	Non-album single
"Это не месячные" (with Ежемесячные)	2017	—	Non-album single
"Мне Нравится" (featuring Big Russian Boss)	2017	—	Non-album single
"Больше чем жизнь" (featuring Джиган)	2018	—	Non-album single

== Awards ==
Preceded by Dima Bilan with "Never Let You Go"	Russia in the Eurovision Song Contest; 2007 (as part of Serebro)	Succeeded by Dima Bilan with "Believe"
