= Maxim Fadeev =

Russian singer-songwriter & composer (born 1968)

Max Fadeev Макс Фадеев
- Fadeev in 2023

Background information
- Born: Maxim Aleksandrovich Fadeev; 6 May 1968 (age 58); Kurgan, Kurgan Oblast, Russian SFSR, Soviet Union
- Origin: Moscow, Russia
- Genres: Alternative rock; pop rock; trip hop
- Occupations: Singer; songwriter; composer; music producer; talent manager; television producer
- Instruments: Electric guitar; bass guitar; synthesizer
- Years active: 1989–present
- Labels: Melodiya, Monolit Records, Malfa
- Website: max-fadeev.ru

Maxim "Max" Aleksandrovich Fadeev (Russian: Максим Александрович Фадеев; born 6 May 1968) is a Russian singer, songwriter, composer and producer.

== Biography ==
=== Early life and career ===
Maxim Fadeev was born on 6 May 1968 in Kurgan, Kurgan Oblast, Russian Soviet Federative Socialist Republic, Union of Soviet Socialist Republics. His father, Alexander Ivanovich Fadeev (1941–2016) was a head teacher at a music college.

When he was a child, he attended a musical school in Kurgan, and learned how to play bass guitar. He later attended two universities, both musical, when aged only fifteen.

Fadeev started working with professional musicians in 1989, such as Larisa Dolina and Valery Leontyev. He was supported by showman and actor Sergei Kirillov, who also presented Fadeev to the world of professional music.

=== 1993–2003: Linda and Star Factory 2 ===
In 1993 Fadeev started managing singer Svetlana Geiman, who would later become famous as Linda. Fadeev wrote, produced and composed her music material. Having been managed by Fadeev, Linda rose to media attention and a quick shot to stardom followed, backed by both her over-the-top music which pleased the critics, and her offbeat, semi-ethnic, Tibet-driven visual persona, epitomised by the "Vorona", video which helped her to be eagerly accepted nationwide. The partnership of the two broke in 1999. Linda eventually started writing her songs herself.

After great success as a music producer, Fadeev was also successful as a television producer of the second season of Channel One's talent show Star Factory, Star Factory 2. Star Factory 2 eventually brought to prominence many popular Russian singers, such as Yulia Savicheva, Elena Temnikova, Irakly Pirzhalava, Pierre Narcisse, and Yelena Terleyeva. Savicheva eventually competed for Russia in the Eurovision Song Contest 2004, reaching the 11th place. Soon after Star Factory 2, Fadeev started managing singer Glukoza, who became a music star.

=== 2003–present: Monolit Records, Star Factory 5 and Serebro ===
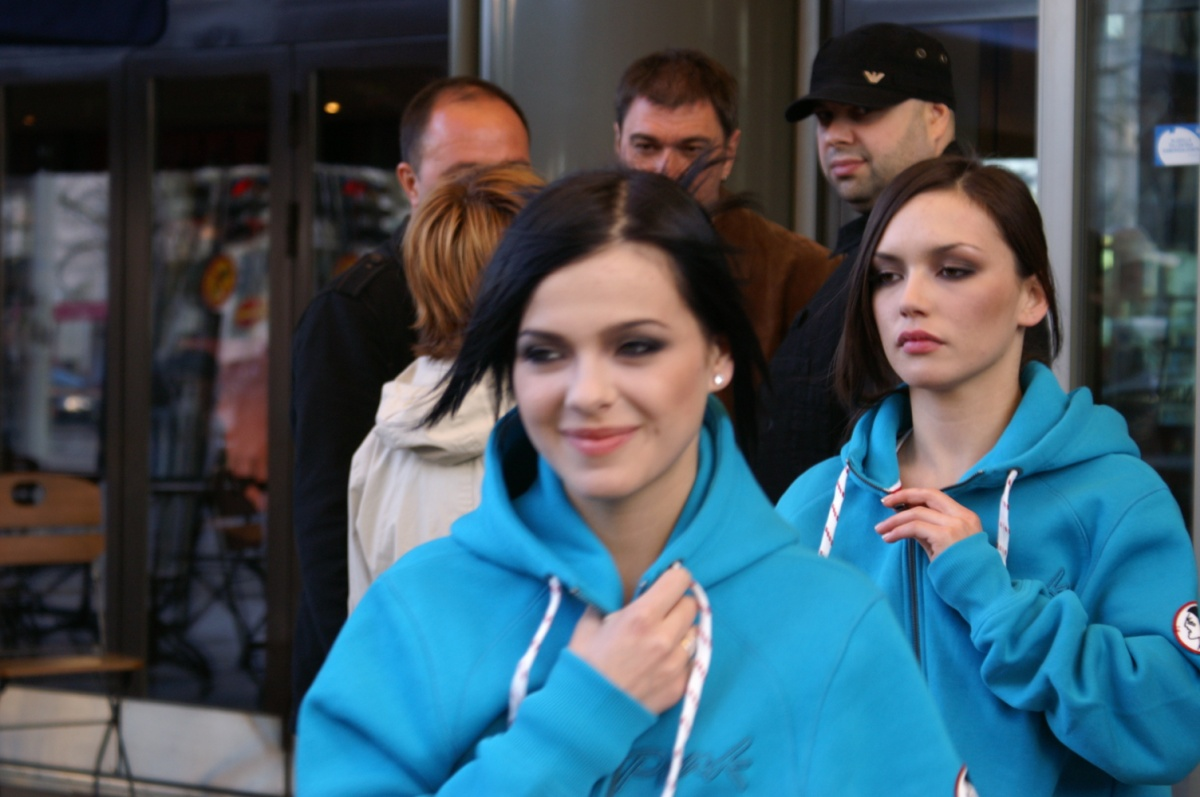
Behind Olga Seryabkina: Maxim Fadeev (in a cap)

Fadeev established his own recording company, Monolit Records, in 2003. Located in Moscow, it soon became one of the most influential recording companies in Russia, as well as in the states of the former USSR. In 2004 Monolit Records produced and published the album of Katya Lel, Джага-Джага, which was certified Platinum in Russia.

In 2005, Fadeev returned to TV production as a co-producer of Channel One's talent show Star Factory 5.

He later focused on his new project, the girl group Serebro. The band won the third place at the Eurovision Song Contest 2007, has won numerous awards since and became one of the most popular Russian pop acts of the decade. The band released their debut album, Opiumroz, on 25 April 2009 for Monolit Records.

Fadeev and Monolit Records opened an audition for a new solo female singer.

=== Cartoon Savva ===
In 2007, Fadeev wrote a book named Savva, and later wrote the original script for the cartoon of the same name. Glukoza Production is involved in producing the 3D cartoon Savva. Fadeev's son, Savva, is the prototype for the cartoon's main hero.

In 2010, American screenwriter Gregory Poirier wrote the adaptation of the cartoon script for the US market, with Fadeev slated to direct the cartoon and compose the score. The premier of the cartoon was scheduled for 2013. In 2011 the voice cast was announced, including Sharon Stone, Whoopi Goldberg, Joe Pesci, Milla Jovovich, and Will Chase. It was released as A Warriors Tail.

== Managed projects ==
=== Current ===
- Serebro
- Glukoza
- Alisa Kozhikina
- Irina Ponarovskaya

=== Former ===
- Oleg Miami
- Linda
- Irakly Pirzhalava
- Pier Narciss
- Katya Lel
- Lora
- Konvoy
- Percy
- Victoria Ilinskaya
- Star Factory 2
- Star Factory 5
- VORON
- Kit-I
- Olga Romanovskaya
- Total
- MOLLY (Olga Seryabkina)
- Nargiz Zakirova
- Yulia Savicheva

== Discography ==
=== Albums ===
- Nozhnisi (Ножницы; Scissors)
- Triumph (Триумф)

=== Singles ===
- "Сицилия" (feat. Glukoza)
- "Вдвоём" (feat. Nargiz)
- "Breach the Line"
- "С любимыми не расставайтесь" (feat. Nargiz)
- "Орлы или вороны" (feat. Grigory Leps)
- "Тем, кто рядом" (feat. Yulianna Karaulova)

== Honours and awards ==
- Honoured Worker of the Arts Industry of the Russian Federation (30 December 2022)
