= Shiver (disambiguation) =

Shivering is a bodily function.

Shiver may also refer to:

== People ==
- Dr. Shiver (born 1983), Italian record producer, musician, and DJ
- Clay Shiver (born 1972), American football player
- Harry Shiver (born 1946), American politician
- Ivey Shiver (1907–1972), American football and baseball player
- Kelly Shiver, member of the country music duo Thrasher Shiver
- Sanders Shiver (born 1955), American football player and coach

== Music ==
=== Albums ===
- Shiver (D. C. Simpson album), 2005
- Shiver (Jamie O'Neal album) or the title song (see below), 2000
- Shiver (Jenny Morris album) or the title song, 1989
- Shiver (Jónsi album) or the title song, 2020
- Shiver (Rose Chronicles album) or the title song, 1994

=== Songs ===
- "Shiver" (Coldplay song), 2000
- "Shiver" (The Gazette song), 2010
- "Shiver" (George Benson song), 1986
- "Shiver" (Jamie O'Neal song), 2000
- "Shiver" (Natalie Imbruglia song), 2005
- "Shiver" (Shawn Desman song), 2010
- "Shiver", by the Birthday Massacre from Looking Glass, 2008
- "Shiver", by Elliot Minor from Solaris, 2010
- "Shiver", by Halestorm from Everest, 2025
- "Shiver", by John Summit featuring Hayla, 2024
- "Shiver", by Maroon 5 from Songs About Jane, 2002
- "Shiver", by Rachel Chinouriri from I Think I Spoke Too Soon, 2026
- "Shiver", by Whole Doubts featuring Jaira Burns, 2019

== Other uses ==
- Shiver (2003 film), a Hong Kong horror film
- Shiver (2012 film), an American thriller film
- Shiver (2027 film), an American science fiction survival film
- Shiver, a 2009 Wolves of Mercy Falls novel by Maggie Stiefvater
- Shiver (novel), a 2021 novel by Allie Reynolds
- Shiver Point, a summit in Graham Land, Antarctica
- Shiver Productions, a British TV production company
- Aprilia SL 750 Shiver, a motorcycle
- Shiver (Splatoon), a member of Deep Cut in Splatoon 3

== See also ==
- Eskalofrío (from escalofrío, Spanish for "shiver"), a 2008 Spanish horror film
- Shiver Me Timbers (disambiguation)
- Shivers (disambiguation)
- Shudder (disambiguation)
