= Alex Neri =

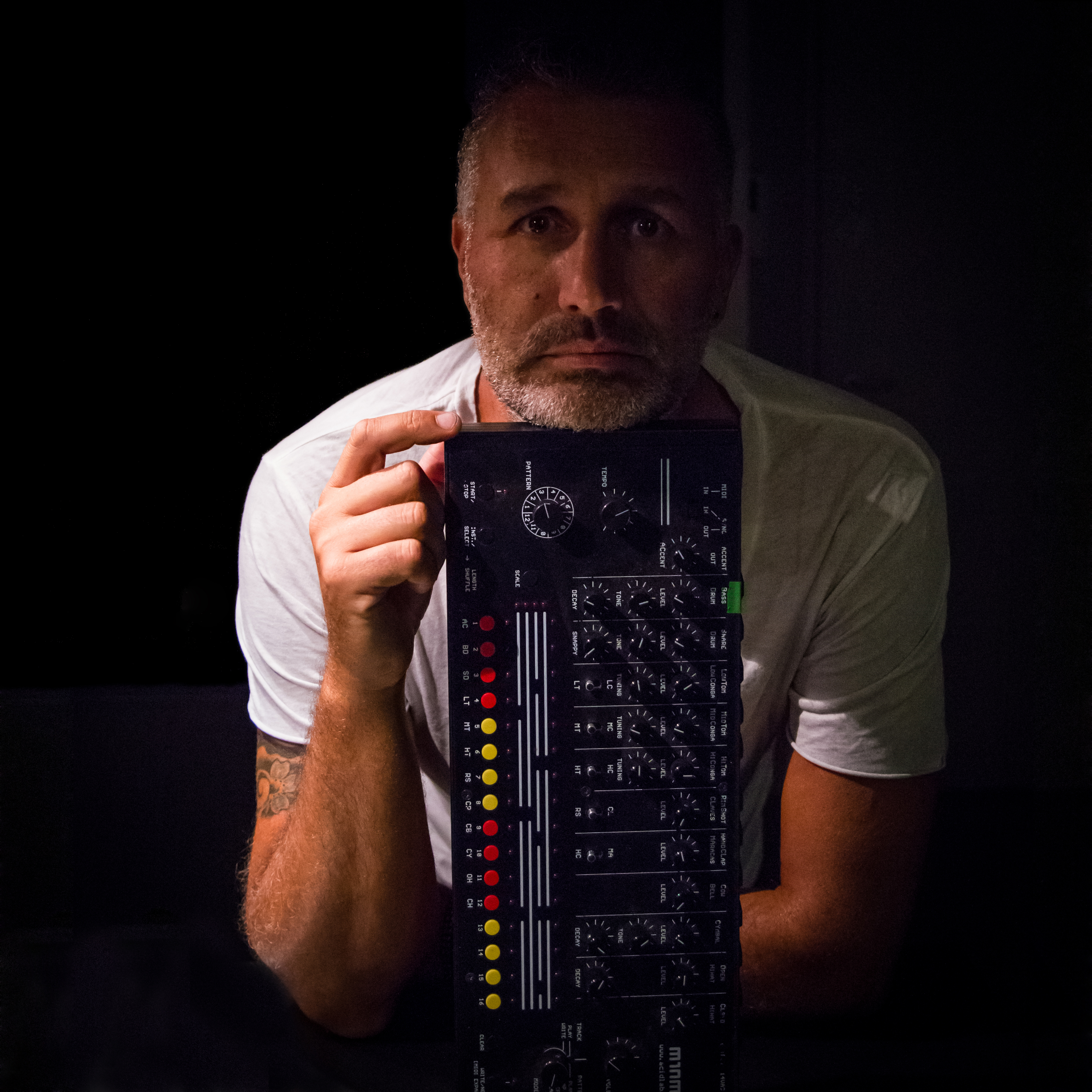

Background information
- Also known as: Alex Lee
- Born: Alex Neri; 16 June 1970 (age 56); Sarzana, Italy
- Genres: Dance, electronic rock, indie rock
- Occupations: Musician, songwriter, DJ
- Years active: 1986–present
- Website: www.alexneri.com

Alex Neri (born on 16 June 1970) is an Italian DJ, producer and songwriter.

== Biography ==
A founding member of Planet Funk, having formed the band in the late 90s, Alex Neri also pursued a solo career and established an independent record label named Tenax Recordings.

He started his career playing at the Alhambra, a nightclub in Sarzana owned by his father. Neri began his studio activity collaborating with Marco Baroni and working on different productions such as the Korda project ('Move Your Body') and Kamasutra ('Storm In My Soul'), all while releasing remixed productions for artists such as Club Freaks, Annette Taylor, Future Force, Instant Funk and Jestofunk.

In 1998 Neri and Baroni launched their first single 'Happiness' featuring Jocelyn Brown, which reached 5th place on dance charts in the US and 45th place in the UK. At the same time, Alex Neri met and started collaborating with Gigi Canu and Sergio della Monica, which led to the establishment of Planet Funk.

== Discography ==
=== Solo albums ===
- 1992: The Wizard
- 1993: Soave (with DJ Le Roy Feat. Bocachica)
- 1995: Headphone (EP)
- 1995: Planet Funk
- 1996: Planet Funk 2
- 2004: Housetrack/Club Element
- 2004: Aurora
- 2006: April
- 2007: La Fotografia (with Luca Bacchetti)
- 2008: Warm Vibes (EP) (with Marco Solforetti and Ilario Alicante)
- 2014: Mystic Tattoo (with Marco Baroni)
- 2015: Desert Rose (with Federico Grazzini)

=== Planet Funk ===
- 2002: Non Zero Sumness
- 2005: The Illogical Consequence
- 2006: Static
- 2009: Planet Funk
- 2011: The Great Shake
