= Planet Funk (album) =

Greatest hits album by Planet Funk
- Released: 6 March 2009
- Genre: Alternative rock; electronic rock
- Label: Universal Music
- Producer: Planet Funk

Planet Funk chronology
Static (2006)	Planet Funk (2009)	The Great Shake (2011)

Planet Funk is a self-titled compilation album by the Italian electronic group Planet Funk, released by Universal Music in 2009. It contains all 15 of the group's singles, plus three new songs.

== Track listing ==
1. "Lemonade" – 3:41
  - vocals by Dan Black
  - written by A. Neri, D. Black, D. Canu, M. Baroni and S. Della Monica
2. "Inside All the People" – 4:57 (Non Zero Sumness, 2002)
  - vocals by Dan Black
  - written by Alessandro Neri, Dan Black, Domenico Canu, Marco Baroni, Sergio Della Monica and Simon Duffy
3. "Stop Me" – 3:47 (The Illogical Consequence, 2005)
  - vocals by John Graham
  - written by Alessandro Neri, Domenico Canu, John Graham, Marco Baroni, Sergio Della Monica and Simon Duffy
4. "Who Said" – 3:36 (Non Zero Sumness, 2002)
  - vocals by Dan Black
  - written by Alessandro Neri, Dan Black, Domenico Canu, Gary Numan, Marco Baroni and Sergio Della Monica
5. "Too Much TV" – 3:04
  - vocals by Dan Black
  - written by Alessandro Neri, Dan Black, Domenico Canu, Marco Baroni and Sergio Della Monica
6. "The Switch" – 5:15 (Non Zero Sumness, 2002)
  - vocals by Dan Black
  - written by Alessandro Neri, Dan Black, Domenico Canu, Marco Baroni and Sergio Della Monica
7. "Come Alive" – 4:17 (The Illogical Consequence, 2005)
  - vocals by John Graham
  - written by Alessandro Neri, Domenico Canu, John Graham, Marco Baroni, Sergio Della Monica and Simon Duffy
8. "Chase the Sun" – 3:53 (Non Zero Sumness, 2002)
  - vocals by Auli Kokko
  - written by Alessandro Neri, Auli Kokko, Domenico Canu, Marco Baroni, Sergio Della Monica, and Simon Duffy
9. "Paper Feathers" – 4:44
  - vocals by Dan Black
  - written by Alessandro Neri, Dan Black, Domenico Canu, Marco Baroni and Sergio Della Monica
10. "Paraffin" – 4:31 (Non Zero Sumness, 2002)
  - vocals by Dan Black
  - written by Alessandro Neri, Dan Black, Domenico Canu, Marco Baroni and Sergio Della Monica
11. "Everyday" – 4:20 (The Illogical Consequence, 2005)
  - vocals by John Graham
  - written by Alessandro Neri, Domenico Canu, John Graham, Marco Baroni, Sergio Della Monica and Simon Duffy
12. "It's Your Time" – 2:59 (Static, 2006)
  - vocals by Luke Allen
  - written by Alessandro Neri, Domenico Canu, Hugh Harris, Luke Allen, Marco Baroni and Sergio Della Monica
13. "Peak" – 3:47 (The Illogical Consequence, 2005)
  - vocals by Dan Black
  - written by Alessandro Neri, Dan Black, Domenico Canu, Marco Baroni, Sergio Della Monica and Simon Duffy
14. "Static" – 4:57 (Static, 2006)
  - vocals by Luke Allen
  - written by Alessandro Neri, Domenico Canu, Hugh Harris, Luke Allen, Marco Baroni and Sergio Della Monica
15. "All Man's Land" – 5:33 (Non Zero Sumness, 2002)
  - vocals by Sally Doherty
  - written by Alessandro Neri, Domenico Canu, Marco Baroni, Sally Doherty and Sergio Della Monica
16. "Ultraviolet Days" – 4:48 (The Illogical Consequence, 2005)
  - vocals by John Graham
  - written by Alessandro Neri, Domenico Canu, John Graham, Marco Baroni, Sergio Della Monica and Simon Duffy
17. "One Step Closer" – 6:43 [Where Is the Max](Non Zero Sumness, 2002)
  - vocals by Jim Kerr
  - written by Alessandro Neri, Domenico Canu, Jim Kerr, Marco Baroni and Sergio Della Monica
18. "The End" – 4:34 (The Illogical Consequence, 2005)
  - vocals by John Graham
  - written by Alessandro Neri, Domenico Canu, John Graham, Marco Baroni, Sergio Della Monica and Simon Duffy

== Charts ==
Chart performance for Planet Funk
Chart (2009)	Peak position
Italian Albums (FIMI)	16
