= Alex Uhlmann =

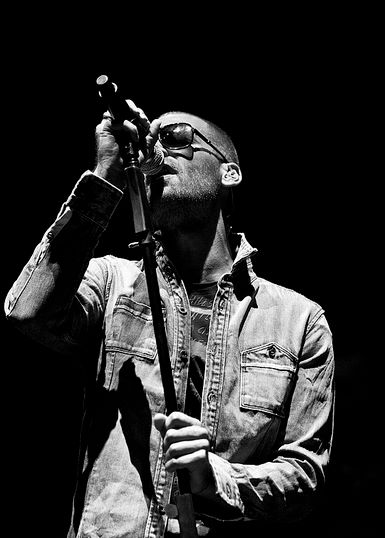

Background information
- Born: Alexander Uhlmann; 26 February 1981 (age 45); Luxembourg
- Genres: Dance-rock, synth-pop, electronic rock, indie rock
- Occupations: Musician, songwriter
- Instruments: Vocals, guitar
- Years active: 2006–present
- Labels: Capitol East Records, Universal Music, Hoernsenmusic
- Member of: Planet Funk
- Formerly of: Friday Night Hero
- Website: www.alexuhlmann.com

Alexander Uhlmann (born 26 February 1981), also known as Alex Uhlmann, is a Luxembourgish singer-songwriter and guitarist, who has been the lead vocalist of the band Planet Funk since 2010. While working with Planet Funk, Uhlmann started a career as a solo artist in 2017 and has worked with DJ David Morales.

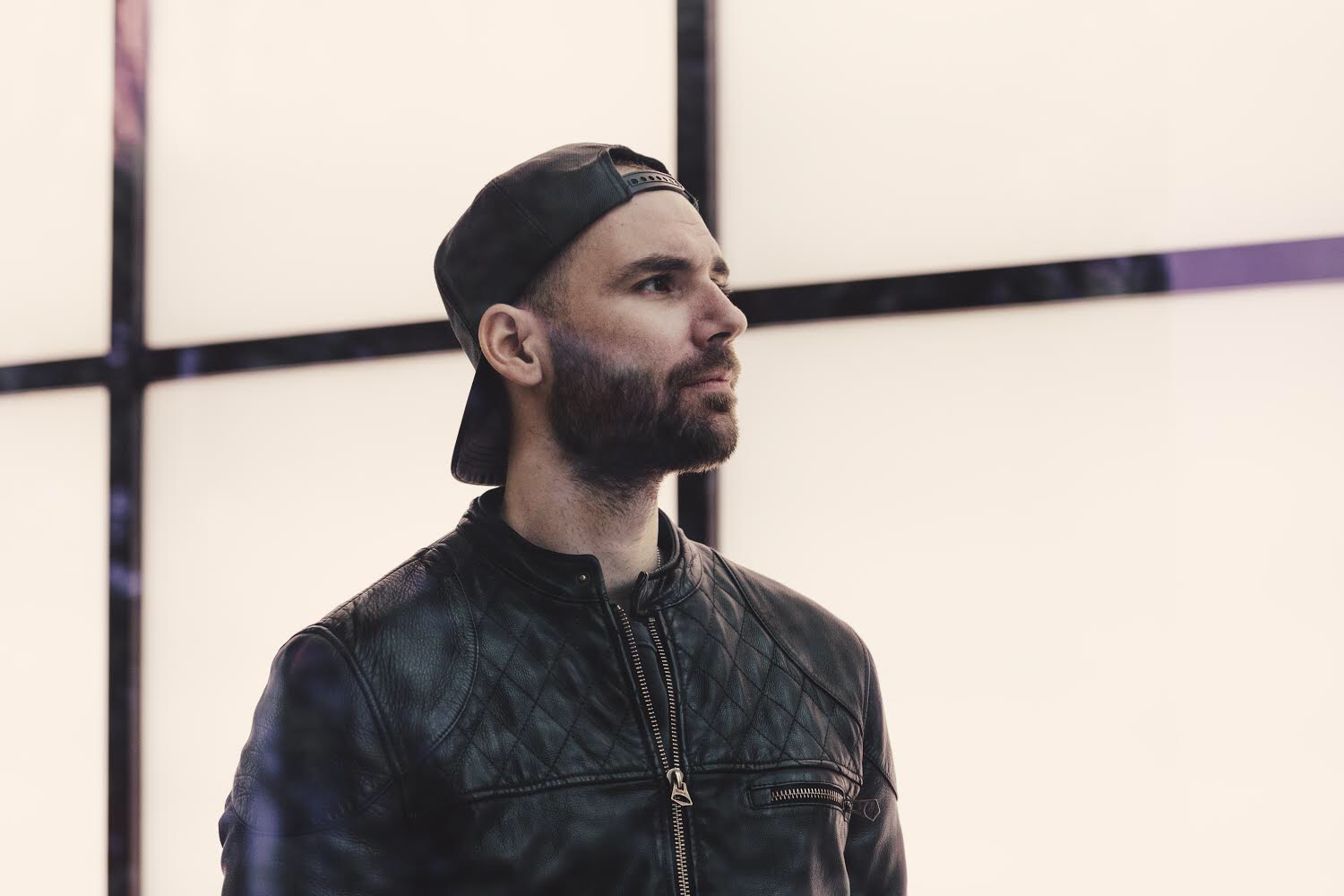
Alex Uhlmann in 2018

== Biography ==
Uhlmann was born in Luxembourg to German parents. He moved to the UK aged 18, to explore the British musical landscape. He formed the indie rock band‚ Friday Night Hero, with whom he released the album Tourist in Your Own Town on 2 October 2009 on Capitol East Records. The band performed in several European countries and were nominated for the Indie award as "best UK live act" in 2008.

In 2010, Uhlmann left Friday Night Hero to join Planet Funk. On 22 September 2011, Planet Funk released their fourth studio album, The Great Shake. This album was their first with Uhlmann on vocals and guitar, and included the singles "Another Sunrise" (used as the soundtrack for the Hyundai i20 Sound Edition TV advertisement), and "Ora il mondo è perfetto", with Giuliano Sangiorgi, frontman of the Italian band Negramaro.

A month later Planet Funk were asked to record a cover of "These Boots Are Made for Walkin'", as the soundtrack for the movie La kryptonite nella borsa by Ivan Cotroneo. The song topped the Italian dance charts and was awarded gold status in Italy for over 15,000 legal downloads. Later on, the single was included in the new version of the album, entitled The Great Shake + 2. It was used for the Italian Wind TV advertisement campaign in 2011/2012.

In 2011, Planet Funk played over a hundred live concerts as part of The Great Shake Tour throughout Europe, including at the Formula One Grand Prix in Monza with Jamiroquai, the Olympic stadium in Rome with Tiesto and at the MTV Days in Turin.

In September 2012, Uhlmann was chosen as protagonist for the Italian Reebok campaign for which he shot a TV spot in Paris. Together with Planet Funk he designed a Reebok shoe, the "PF 1999", that was released in March 2013.

In 2013, during the MTV Digital Days in Turin, Uhlmann performed the "Planet Funk DJ Set" for the first time alongside Alex Neri and a tour of Italy followed, which included a set at the MTV European Music Awards after party in Milan in October 2015.

On 13 October 2015, Planet Funk released their single "We People", with Uhlmann on vocals, chosen by Save the Children as soundtrack for their "Everyone" campaign, dedicating all profits to Save the Children.

=== Solo career ===
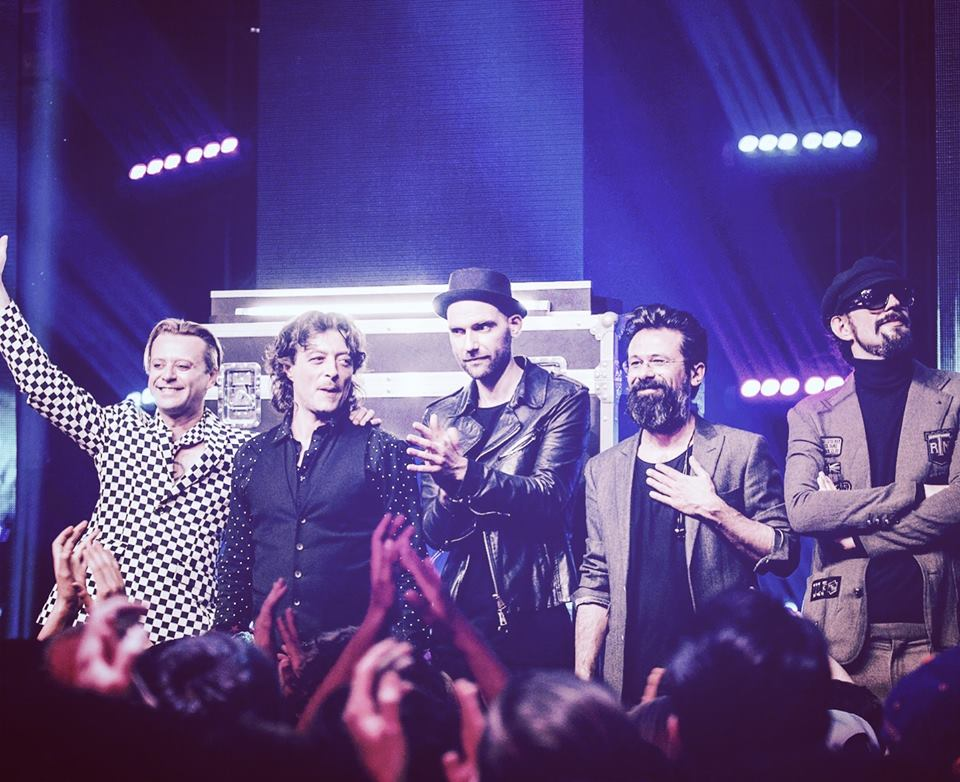
Alex Uhlmann insieme alla "superband" formata da Sergio Carnevale dei Bluvertigo.

In parallel with his activity in Planet Funk, Uhlmann started producing and writing for other artists. He began collaborating on a project created by Bluvertigo's drummer, Sergio Carnevale, the "Superband" which unites members of Italian bands for events and special performances. With the "superband" (featuring Carnevale, Uhlmann, Ligabue's guitarist, Federico Poggipollini and Marco Garrincha Castellani of Le Vibrazioni) Uhlmann took part in the documentary Vinyl Talk, which was broadcast on Sky Italia in February 2016. In July of the same year Uhlmann and the "Superband" appeared for a guest performance on the talent show Top DJ, aired on Mediaset.

In 2017, Uhlmann released a single entitled "Anyway", 24 January 2017, in collaboration with the DJ Francis Davila, from Guatemala.

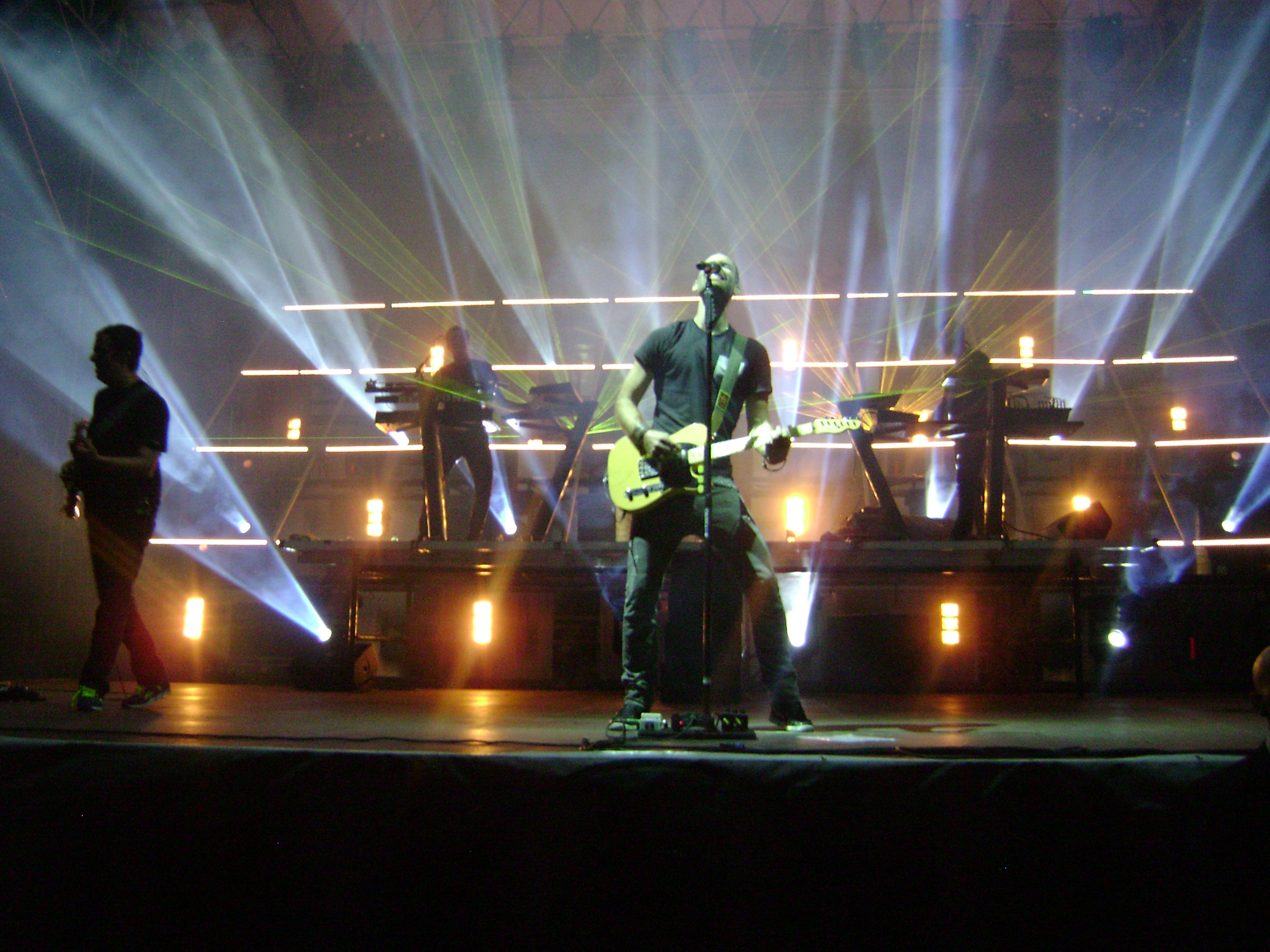
Alex Uhlmann, live with Planet Funk for "The Great Shake Tour 2012"

On 14 July 2017 Uhlmann released "The Ocean ft. Edo", through Sony Music.

In 2018, Uhlmann was chosen by IBM Italy to experiment with artificial intelligence in songwriting. The result was the lyrics to his second solo single "Butterfly", released on 15 June 2018.

Uhlmann began 2019 with a DJ set at the San Siro stadium in Milan for AC Milan's Serie A home match against SSC Napoli. On 19 April, Nervous Records released the second single of his collaboration with David Morales: "One Race" was remixed by Spanish house duo Chus & Ceballos and chosen by Hector Romero for his Weaving Genres vol. 2 (Nervous Records). Uhlmann was appointed artistic and musical director for The Voice of Italy which aired on Rai 2 from 23 April until 4 June and was presented by Simona Ventura.

In 2020, Uhlmann was confirmed as musical director for the Voice of Italy Senior, aired on Rai 1 and presented by Antonella Clerici.

In February 2021, he released a single "Paris or Rome" in Europe. The second single "Never Be The Same" was released on 21 May 2021. In 2022 the remix of "Only For a Minute" by Stehreo reached the dance charts in Germany (Top 25), Austria (Top 30) and Switzerland.

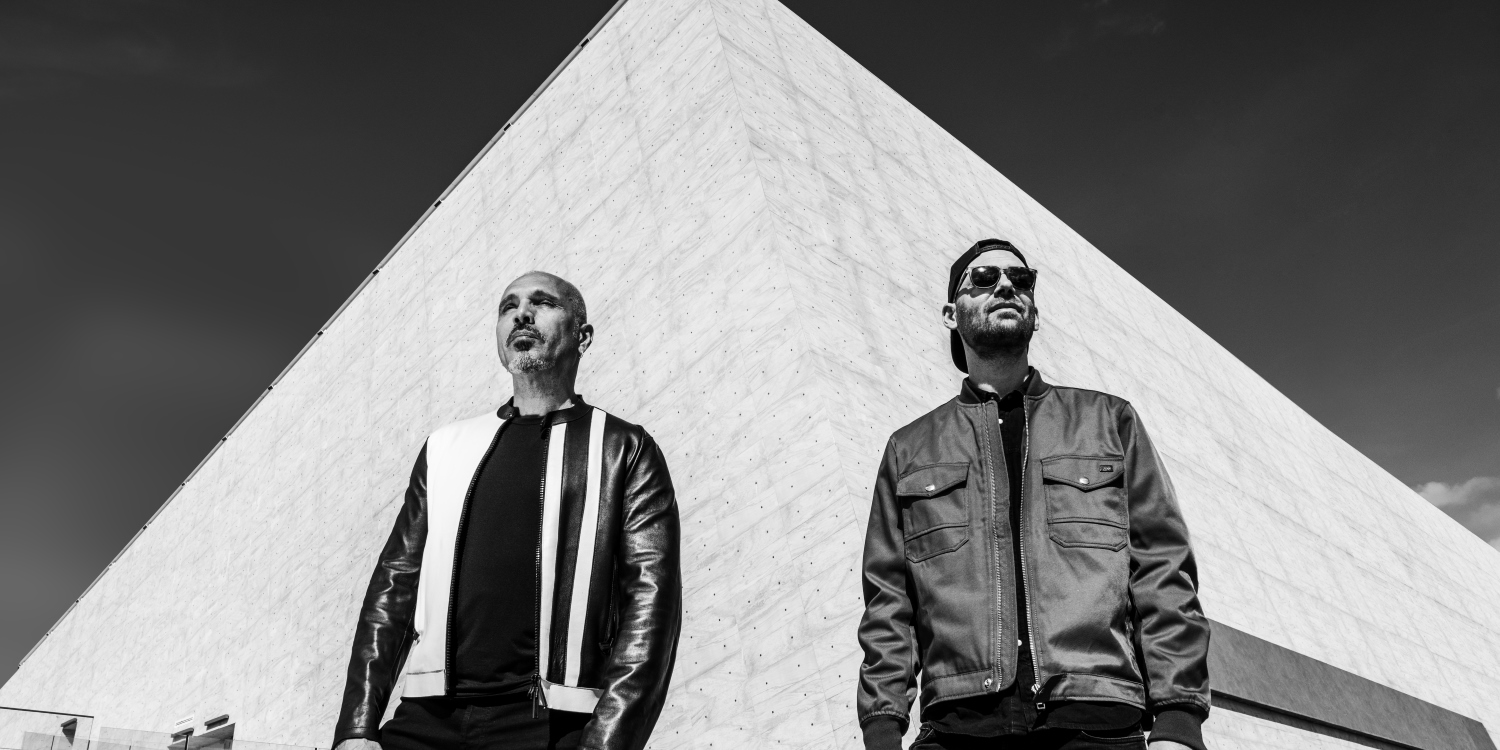
Alex Uhlmann with David Morales

== Discography ==
=== Friday Night Hero ===
- 2009 – Tourist in Your Own Town (label: Capitol East Records)

=== Planet Funk ===
- 2011 – The Great Shake (label: Universal Music)
- 2012 – The Great Shake + 2 (label: Universal Music)

=== Alex Uhlmann ===
- 2017 – "The Ocean" (ft. Edo) (single, label: Sony Music)
- 2018 – "Butterfly" (single, label: Universal Music)
- 2021 – "Paris or Rome" (Single, Label: Hoernsenmusic)
- 2021 – "Never be the same" (Single, Label: Hoernsenmusic)
- 2022 – "Only For A Minute" (Single, Label: Hoernsenmusic)
- 2022 – "Only For A Minute (Sterio Remix)" (Single, Label: Hoernsenmusic)
- 2024 – "Fading Away" (Single, Label: Hoernsenmusic)

== Collaborations ==
- 2012 Giuliano Sangiorgi: vocals on "Ora il mondo è perfetto" on the album The Great Shake
- 2012 Ivan Cotroneo: Director of the music video for "These Boots Are Made for Walkin'"
- 2017 Francis Davila: in "Anyway"
- 2018 – 2019 David Morales: in "Back Home" (single, label: Diridim) and "One Race" (single, label: Nervous Records)
