= Art&Music Recording =

Italian record label

- Founded: 2002
- Founder: Dr. Shiver; Omar Zenzon
- Genre: Progressive house, electro house, big room house, deep house, future house
- Country of origin: Italy
- Location: Gallarate, Italy
- Official website: artandmusicrecording.com

Art&Music Recording is an Italian music record label, publishing company and recording studio, founded by Dr. Shiver and Omar Zenzon in 2009. The headquarters are located in Gallarate, a few kilometers north of Milan.

== Studios ==
The Art&Music Studio is the largest recording studio in Italy. Completed in October 2012, it covers an area of 1000 square meters. The project was developed and managed by a team headed by Josif Vezzoli from JVC Acoustics.

Control Room A, with 50 square metres of floor, is the largest in Europe. Equipment includes a 48-channel mixer and six recording booths. Both control rooms are dedicated to recording, mixing and mastering. Control Room B also records dubbing for films, TV spots and videos.

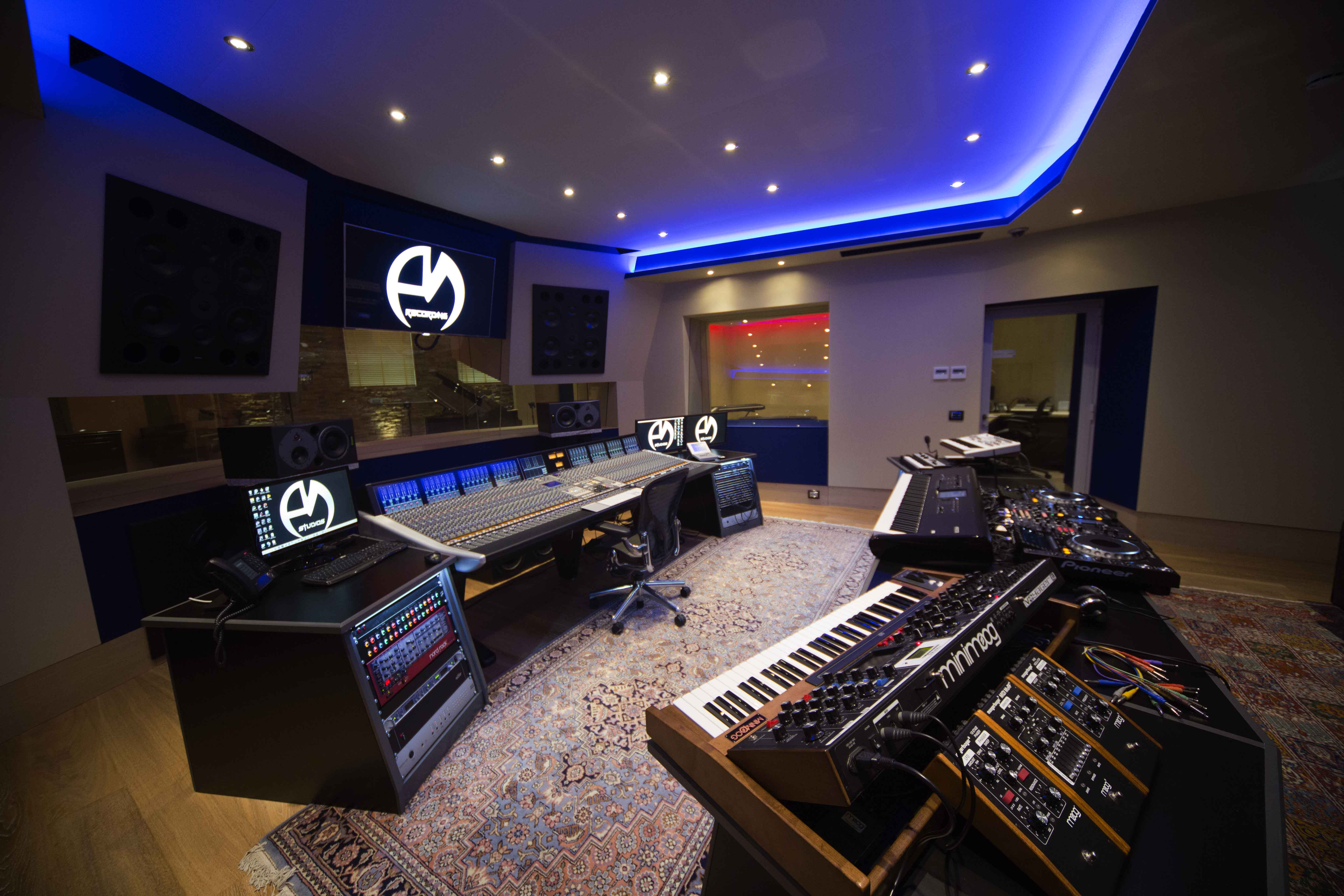

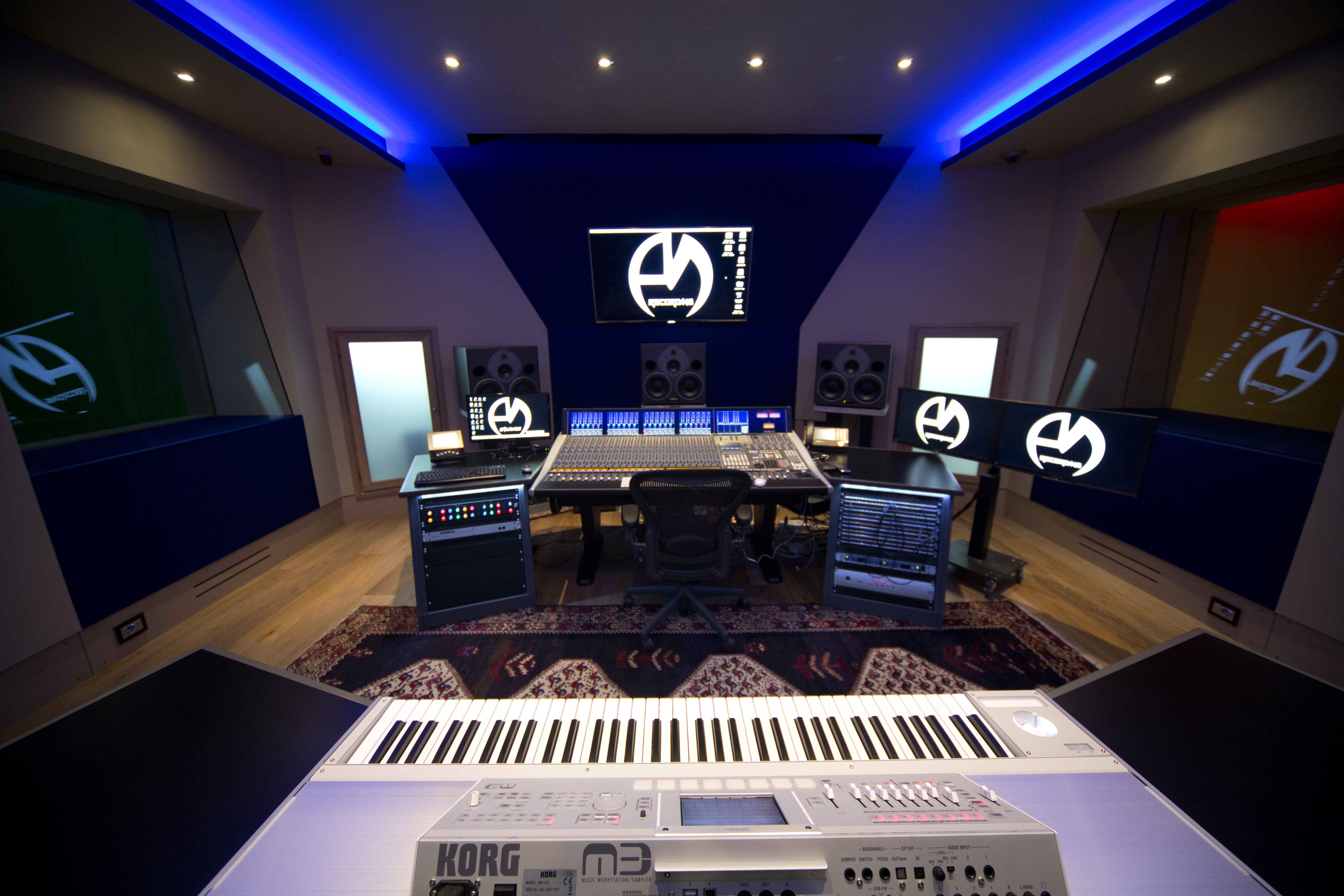

== Label ==
Art&Music Recording was founded in 2009 as a dance record label focused on progressive house, electro house, house music, future house, deep house and EDM. In 2012 the Russian trio Serebro joined the Art&Music roster with their hit single Mama Lover. As of 2022, Art&Music Recording had a roster of more than 80 artists.

In 2013 Art&Music released the track “Catch Me” by Doc M.C. (ft Mimi Blix). The track reached the semi-finals of the Eurovision Song Contest in Malmö and was licensed to Sony Music.

On 28 September 2015 Art&Music Recording released “You Got The Love” by Dr. Shiver – Candi Staton, the first official remix featuring the original 1986 vocal by Candi Staton. This track was chosen for the soundtrack of the Aftermovie of TomorrowWorld 2015.

On 22 May 2017, Art&Music Recording released "Kubera" by David Allen, who featured in the Tomorrowland Belgium 2017 Aftermovie.

== Artists ==
- Dr. Shiver
- Pharrell Williams
- Frank Ocean
- Fatman Scoop
- Daddy's Groove
- Shapov
- Michael Feiner
- Solberjum
- David Allen
- John Christian
- Galoski
- Merk & Kremont
- Polina
- Ola
- Candi Staton
- Doc M.C.
- Christina Skaar
- Luke Morse
- SWACQ
- Chingy
- Dre Melz
- Magnus Foss
- Corx
- Mathias D.
- Floats
- Tindaro & Jimcash
- Serebro
- Federico Clapis
- Jmi Sissoko
- Michelle Lily
- Simone Cattaneo
- Sewit Jacob Villa
- Static False
- Roberto Mastromauro
- Mula Lansky
- Mauro Cottini
- Luca Monticelli
- Kim Covington
- Havoc & Lawn
- Fred Gun
- Edgar Bet
- Kristian Vivo
- Cat Alex
- Bo Valentine
- Antony D'Andrea
- Pro Bangah
- Sammy Juice&Moto
- Fine Touch
- Tim Gartz
- Mimi Blix
- Masse Bros
- Marco Evans
- Luca Dimoon
- Eric Tyrell

== Partners ==
- Pioneer
- Steinberg
- Dynaudio
- Solid State Logic
- Apple
- Google
- Miloco Studios
- YouTube
- SoundCloud
- Shazam
