= Shivers =

Shivers may refer to:

- Shivers, an instance of shivering, or the fast contraction and release of muscles
- Equine shivers, a neuromuscular disease of horses

== Media ==
=== Music ===
- The Shivers (1990s band), an alt-country band
- The Shivers (2000s band), a rock, folk and soul duo
- Shivers (album), a 2005 album by Armin van Buuren
- "Shivers" (The Boys Next Door song), a Rowland S. Howard song, popularised by Boys Next Door and Screaming Jets
- "Shivers" (Armin van Buuren song), 2005
- "Shivers" (Ed Sheeran song), 2021

=== Other uses ===
- Shivers (1975 film), a film directed by David Cronenberg
- Shivers (1981 film), a Polish drama film
- Shivers (magazine), a British magazine covering the horror genre in movies and literature
- Shivers (novel series), a series of children's horror novellas
- Shivers (video game), a 1995 computer game by Sierra On-Line

== See also ==
- Shivers (surname), people with the surname Shivers
- Shiver (disambiguation)
- Mudbird Shivers, album by Dutch punk/experimental band The Ex
- Shivers in Summer, a 1963 comedy film starring Vittorio Gassman
- Shivers the Clown, a fictional Serial Killer in the 2004 horror film Fear of Clowns
- The Piss Shivers (band), punk rock band in Pennsylvania
