= Dr. Shiver =

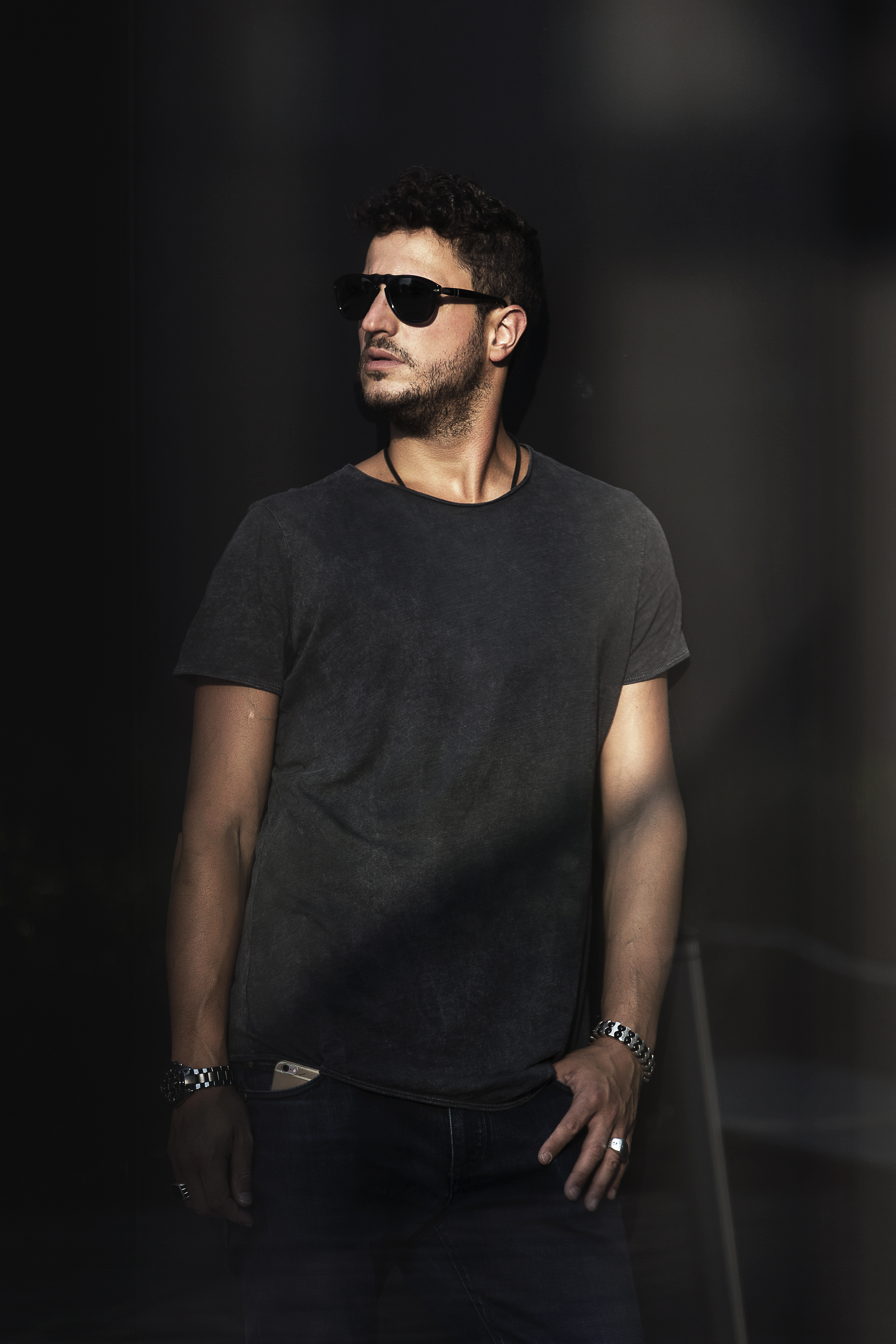
- Dr. Shiver in 2017

Background information
- Born: Bruno Carlo Oggioni; 7 July 1983 (age 42); Milan, Italy
- Genres: Dance; House; Progressive House; EDM; Pop; Jazz; Blues
- Occupations: Record producer; Musician; Pianist; Disc jockey; Sound engineer; Label manager; Remixer
- Years active: 1999–present
- Labels: Art&Music Recording; Sony Music; Kontor Records; Armada Music; Flamingo Recordings; Do It Yourself; Molto Recordings; Mamo Records; Protocol Recordings; TurnItUp Muzik
- Website: www.drshiver.com

Bruno Carlo Oggioni (Italian pronunciation: [ˈbruːno ˈkarlo odˈdʒoːni]; born 7 July 1983), better known as Dr. Shiver and Bruno Riva, is an Italian record producer, musician, pianist, DJ, remixer, sound engineer and label manager. He started working in the music business in 1999, conceived his own record label Art&Music Recording in 2002 and opened the Art&Music Recording Studios in Italy in October 2012.

== Life and career ==
=== Early life ===
Bruno Carlo Oggioni, better known as Dr. Shiver and Bruno Riva, is a record producer, musician, DJ, remixer and label manager. He was born in Milan, Italy, in 1983, to Italian parents. He started in the music industry in 1999, created his own record label, Art&Music Recording, in 2009 and funded the Art&Music Studios in Gallarate (VA) in October 2012, now the biggest recording studios in Italy.

=== Career ===
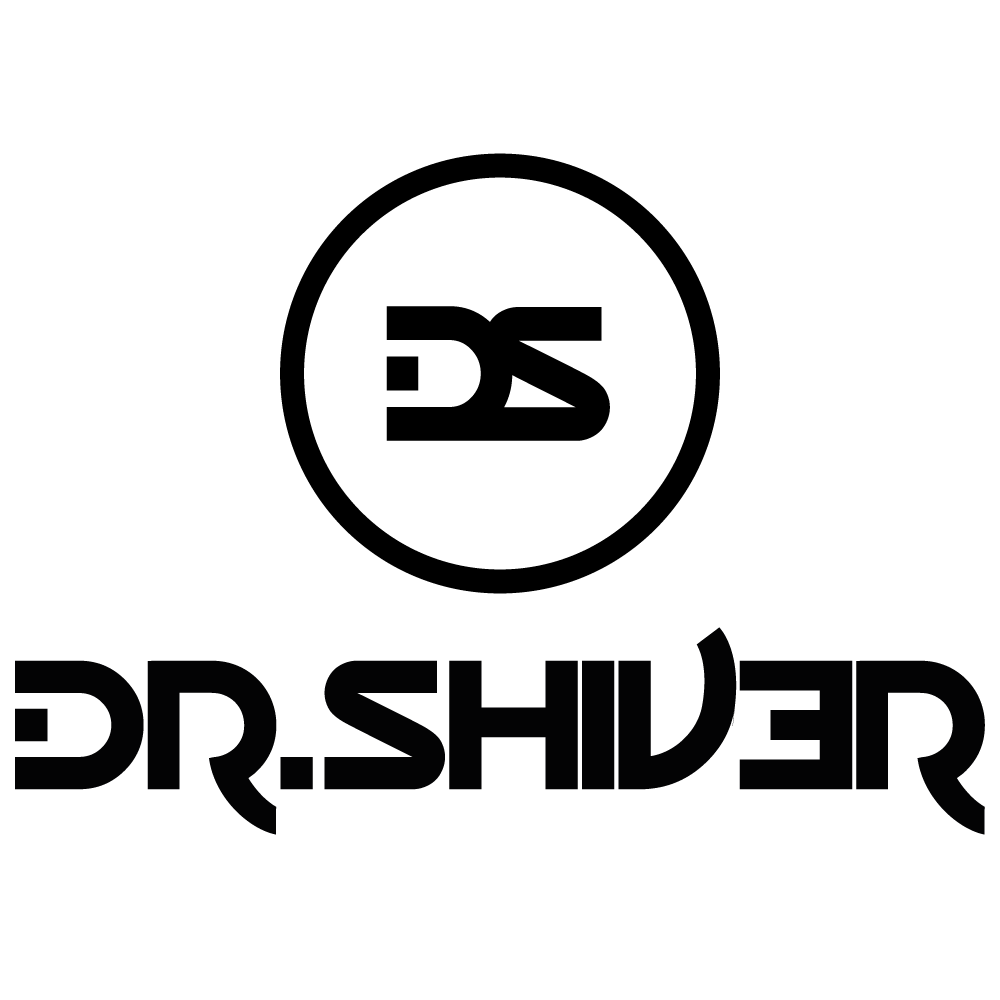
Logo

Born and raised in Milan, Bruno began playing piano, Hammond organ, blues harp and synthesizers at the age of 5. He performed, worked and collaborated with both Italian and international artists, such as Pharrell Williams, Alicia Keys, Nicki Minaj, Frank Ocean, Feid, Latto, 40, Ann Mincieli, Faouzia, Lil Yachty, Fatman Scoop, Nicky Romero, Lucio Dalla, Mike Larson, Shapov, Claudio Cecchetto, Albano, Angelo Branduardi, Marvin Floyd, Little Louie Vega, Ray Bryant, B.B. King, Polina, Merk&Kremont, Daddy's Groove, Third Party, Matisse & Sadko, Lost Frequencies, Umberto Tozzi, Ornella Vanoni, Francesco Facchinetti, Emis Killa, Baby K and Nek. He performed in Europe in events like the La Maddalena Music Festival, the Ascona Jazz Festival, the Noto Blues Festival, the Lago Maggiore Jazz Festival. With a classical, jazz and blues background, he then approached dance, pop and R&B music and began his career as a producer and songwriter. In 2009, he conceived Art&Music Recording, an independent dance record label and recording studio, offering audio/video/web and graphical services. In 2012, he discovered and signed the Russian trio Serebro with their multi=platinum record Mama Lover. Together with his production trio Doc M.C., Dr. Shiver has released several dance singles. The song "Catch Me" was presented at the Eurovision Song Contest 2013, and most of their progressive house tracks have reached high positions in the Beatport charts. Dr. Shiver gained support from many fellow international DJs, such as Martin Garrix, W&W, Afrojack, Nicky Romero, Fedde Le Grand, Danny Ávila, John Christian, Sander Van Doorn, David Guetta, Avicii, Shapov and R3hab. In September 2015, after the historic 1992 version by Frankie Knuckles, Dr. Shiver released the first official and authorized remix of "You Got The Love" by Candi Staton and reached #3 of the UK Pop chart. He was chosen as music producer of the Italian talent show TOP DJ (Sky Italia and Italia 1) for all editions arranging, sound designing, mixing and mastering all the broadcast tracks. In the 2016 edition, he worked with the show supergroup, comprising Federico Poggipollini, Sergio Carnevale, Marco Castellani, Andy Fumagalli and Alex Uhlmann.

In 2017, he made his first appearance at Tomorrowland Belgium, the most important stage in the world. Later, he released "Something" on Protocol Recordings: this release was the beginning of a strong collaboration between the artist and the label, which allowed him to perform on the Melkweg stage to present his record live together with Nicky Romero during the "5 Years of Protocol" party, which took place during the Amsterdam Dance Event. Due to the warm reception of public and critics, the track was followed by an Unplugged version, released on Protocol on 21 December 2017.

In March 2018, Dr. Shiver produced together with Solberjum a rework of the legendary "Bla Bla Bla" by Gigi D'Agostino. In 2018 and 2019, he was also involved in several live-streamed masterclasses, including the ones for Protocol Recordings and Ask.Audio. In summer 2019, he reached his 16th track synched with a Tomorrowland promo video, confirming once again the strong collaboration with the festival.

In 2020, he started a new artistic project under the name Bruno Riva which debuted with a pop/funk track titled "We Need Hope", in collaboration with the National Department of the Italian Civil Protection and AidMe in support of the families of medical staff members who lost their lived during the Covid-19 pandemic, which hit Italy hard in the months between March and May 2020.

In 2023 Bruno started to produce the last album of Italian legend Umberto Tozzi's career, the EP is set to be released on November 28th 2025.

== Discography ==
Singles and Albums

- "Moontime" (2004)
- "Rayo De Luna" ft Marbelis (2009)
- "Praying" ft Tenja (2010)
- "Ass Up" with Tato vs Lake Koast (2010)
- "Fly" ft Marco Evans (2010)
- "Coke" ft Miss Chiara B. (2010)
- "Magic Mushrooms" vs Roberto Fracchetta (2010)
- "Be Proud" ft Tenja (2011)
- "Taste Me" ft Kim Covington (2011)
- "Cry Cry" vs Kristian Vivo ft Marco Evans (2011)
- "Taste Me (Part II)" ft Kim Covington (2011)
- "Call Me Freedom" vs Tato ft Kim Covington (2011)
- "Stop The War" ft Marco Evans (2012)
- "Sexy Babe" with Cekky Sound ft Pro Bangah (2012)
- "Mariachi Hat" (2012)
- "No More Lies" ft Sewit Jacob Villa (2012)
- "Plastic Noise" by Doc M.C. vs Steve Z (2013)
- "Blue Waves" by Doc M.C. (2013)
- "Catch Me" with Doc M.C. ft Mimi Blix (2013)
- "Ruff" by Doc M.C. vs Steve Z (2014)
- "Everybody Jump" ft Pro Bangah and Lunar (2013)
- "The Grind" with Stigma, Luca Monticelli, Pelussje (2014)
- "Say Yes" ft Luke Morse (2014)
- "Wow" by Doc M.C. vs Steve Z (2014)
- "S.M.F." by Doc M.C. ft Static False (2014)
- "Noizer" by Doc M.C. ft Havoc & Lawn (2014)
- "Out of Love" by Doc M.C. vs Tim Gartz ft Lunar (2014)
- "Jungle" by Doc M.C. ft Dre Meltz and Pro Bangah (2014)
- "Runaway" ft Nya (2014)
- "Out of Control" vs Doc M.C. ft Luke Morse (2015)
- "Dom Dom" vs Solberjum ft Bo Valentine (2015)
- "Love For Life" ft Christina Skaar (2016)
- "Something" ft. Kazi (2017)
- "Wusu" with David Allen (2017)
- "Brave Love" ft. Jmi Sissoko (2017)
- "Something" (Live Version) ft. Kazi (2017)
- "A New Beginning" (2017)
- "Brave Love" (Solberjum Remix) ft Jmi Sissoko (2018)
- "Love For Life" (Remixes) ft Christina Skaar (2018)
- "Bla Bla Bla" with Solberjum (2018)
- "Brave Love" (Remixes) ft Jmi Sissoko (2018)
- "Chemistry" with David Allen (2018)
- "Rescue Me" with Jegers (2018)
- "Money Maker" (2018)
- "Tomorrow" with Galoski (2019)
- "We Need Hope" (2020)
- "Faith in You" (2021)

"'Remixes"'

- "You Got The Love (Official Remix)" with Candi Staton ft Doc M.C. (2015)
- Axwell /\ Ingrosso - "Together (Dr. Shiver Remix)" (2016)
- "Swedish House Mafia - Leave The World Behind (Dr. Shiver vs Marc Typ Remix)" (2016)
- Dr. Shiver x Candi Staton - "You Got The Love (Remode)" (2017)
