= Planet Funk =

Italian electronic band

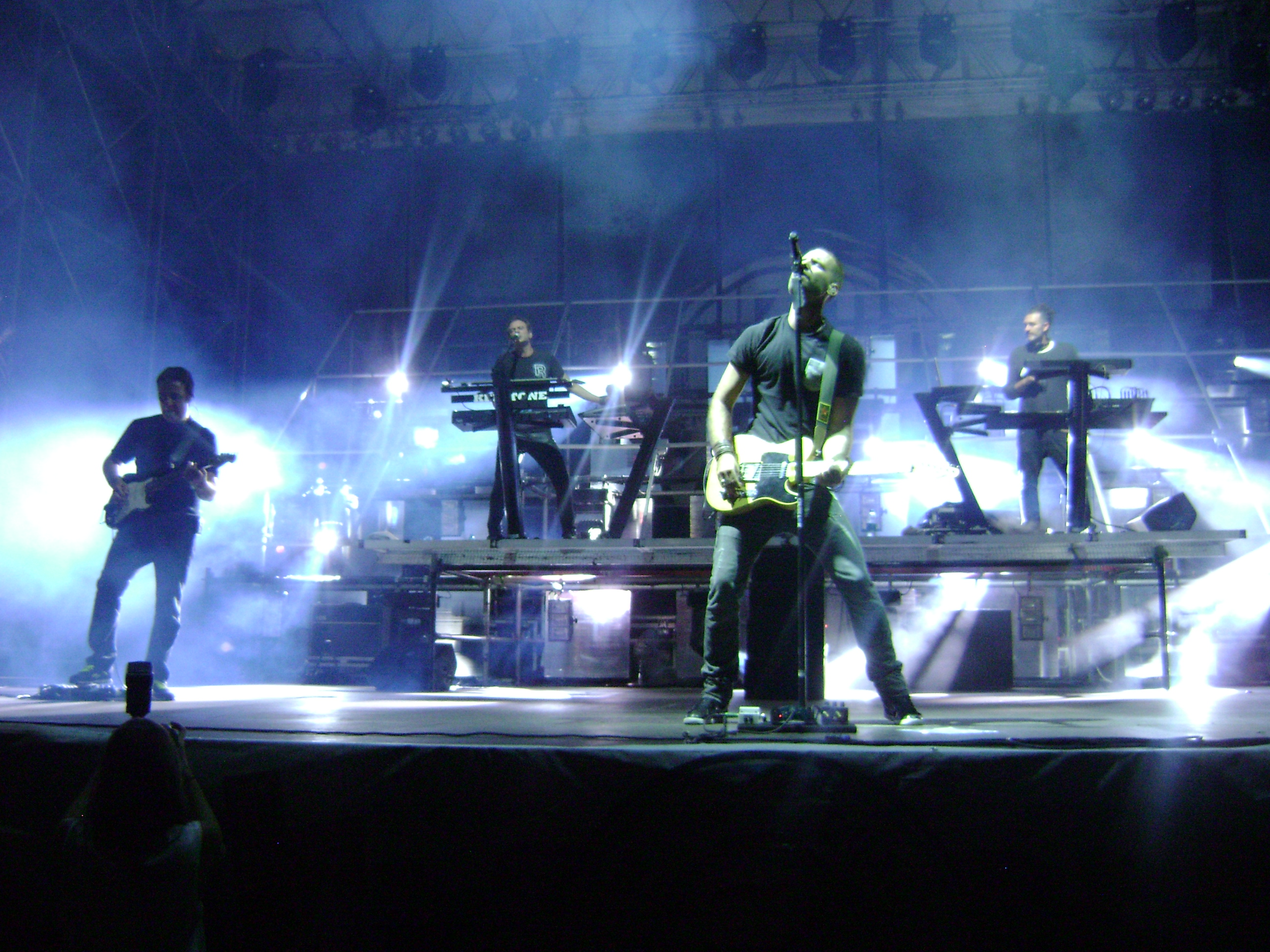
- Planet Funk performing for "The Great Shake Tour 2012" in Cassino, Italy

Background information
- Origin: Naples, Italy
- Genres: Electronic, house, electronic rock, alternative dance
- Years active: 1999–present
- Labels: Universal Music; Bustin' Loose Recordings
- Members: Alex Neri; Marco Baroni; Alessandro Sommella; Alex Uhlmann; Dan Black
- Past members: Sergio Della Monica; Domenico "Gigi" Canu

Planet Funk is an Italian electronic band. The group is composed of Marco Baroni, Alex Neri, Dan Black, Sally Doherty and formerly Sergio Della Monica and Domenico "Gigi" Canu. In addition, a number of guest vocalists joined the group including: Auli Kokko, Raiz, John Graham, Giuliano Sangiorgi and Alex Uhlmann.

== History ==
The group was born from the merger between the former Neapolitan band Souled Out (Alessandro Sommella, Domenico "GG" Canu and Sergio Della Monica) and the Sarzana-based Kamasutra, that is Marco Baroni and Alex Neri.

Their first single, "Chase the Sun", reached number five on the UK Singles Chart in 2001. The melody is borrowed from Ennio Morricone's tune "Alla Luce Del Giorno", off the score of the 1969 film Metti, una sera a cena. The song has enjoyed a rise in popularity ever since Sky Sports began using it during its coverage of the Professional Darts Corporation's major tournaments. The crowds in the venues are encouraged to chant and rave to the song during the advert breaks of matches, and the song has a cult following amongst darts fans. The song is also known to be chanted by supporters at the games of Australian football clubs Newcastle Jets and Adelaide United, as well as being the second half opening theme for the English Football League Championship team, Sheffield Wednesday. English Championship Football team Reading also use the song after they score a goal. Conference side Gateshead play this song at the end of a game, which results in a "Heed Heed Heed" chant along to the beat. English Super League team Wigan Warriors are known to use the song following a successful drop-kick. The Melbourne spring racing carnival used the song during promotional TV advertisements during the mid- to late 2000s. AFC Bournemouth also used the chant for their now former striker Brett Pitman.

Their second single, "Inside All the People", reached no. 9 in the Italian Singles Chart, but did better on the European dance charts. Their third single was "Who Said (Stuck In The UK)" which also gained significant commercial success. Their 2007 single release, "Static", appeared on FIFA 08.

They are also remixers, with their highest-profile work to date being New Order's "Waiting for the Sirens' Call".

In May 2006, they became the first musical group to release a single exclusively as a mobile phone download, with the release of "Stop Me" on the mobile network 3.

In 2009, they released the single "Lemonade", which is featured on their album Planet Funk. The single "Weightless" was released in 2010, a collaboration between Planet Funk and Swedish artist Emilia de Poret.

Their album The Great Shake, featuring the vocalist and guitarist Alex Uhlmann, was released in September 2011; in the same month they opened the F1 Rocks concert at Monza during the Italian Grand Prix. The first single, "Another Sunrise" was released in Italy in May 2011.

In October 2015, they released the single "We-People", a song that supported the global campaign of Save the Children, to fight infant mortality.

"Chase the Sun" was chosen as the goal song of the Colorado Avalanche for the 2017–18 NHL season.

In February 2020, the band released the compilation album 20:20, followed by the remix album 20:20 Remixes in April 2020. The latter was published by Just Entertainment on YouTube and contains a list of remixes made by the band including remixes of unreleased songs "Any Given Day", "Catch the Break" and "I Can Change".

In 2017, bassist and co-founder Sergio Della Monica, who had been undergoing dialysis for years, left the group due to the worsening of his health conditions. He died on February 18, 2018, at the age of 58, from pneumonia.

On May 26, 2025, guitarist Domenico "Gigi" Canu died at the age of 66 due to colon cancer, seven years after his friend and former bandmate Sergio Della Monica.

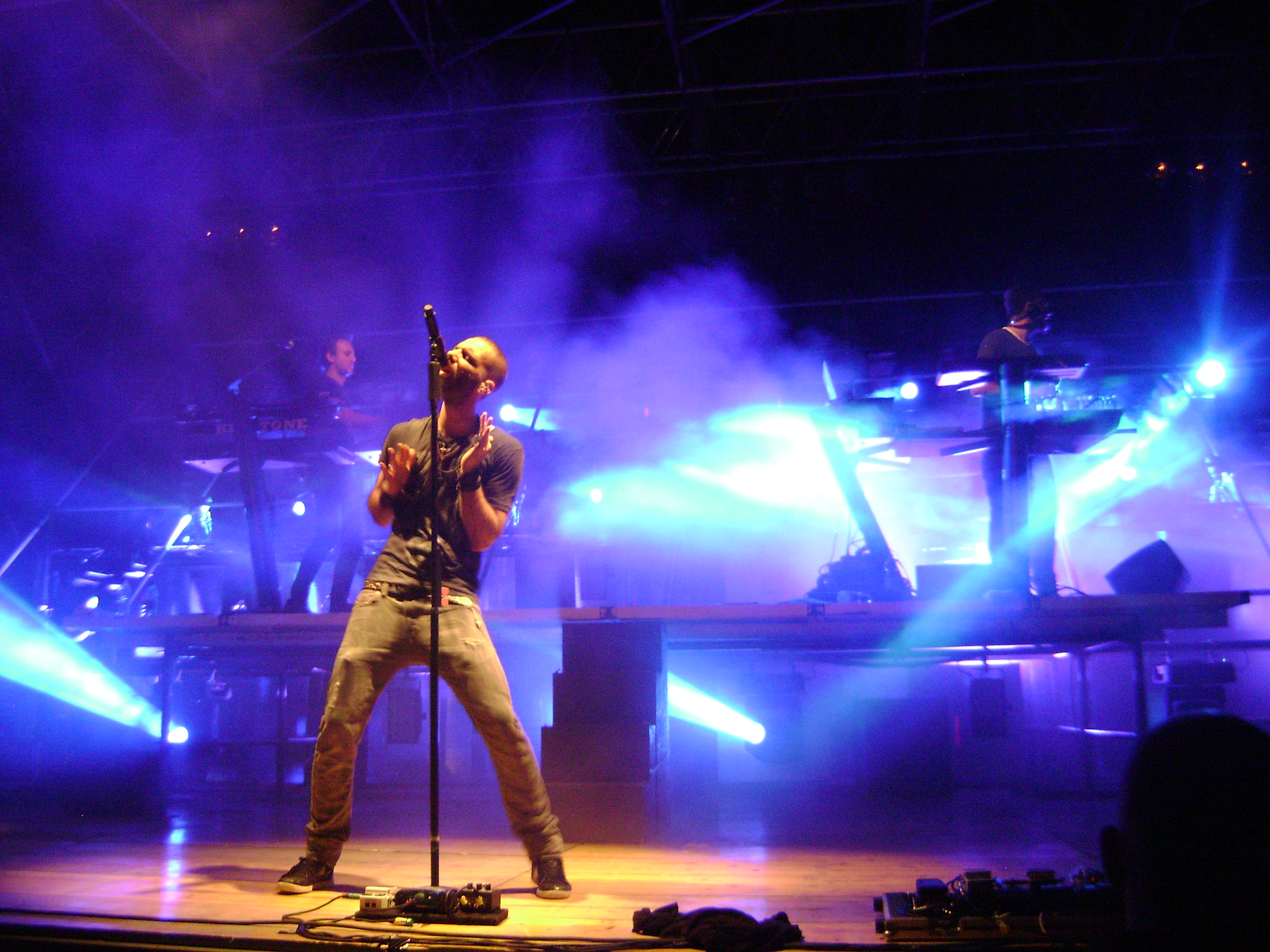
Planet Funk live in Naples, 2012

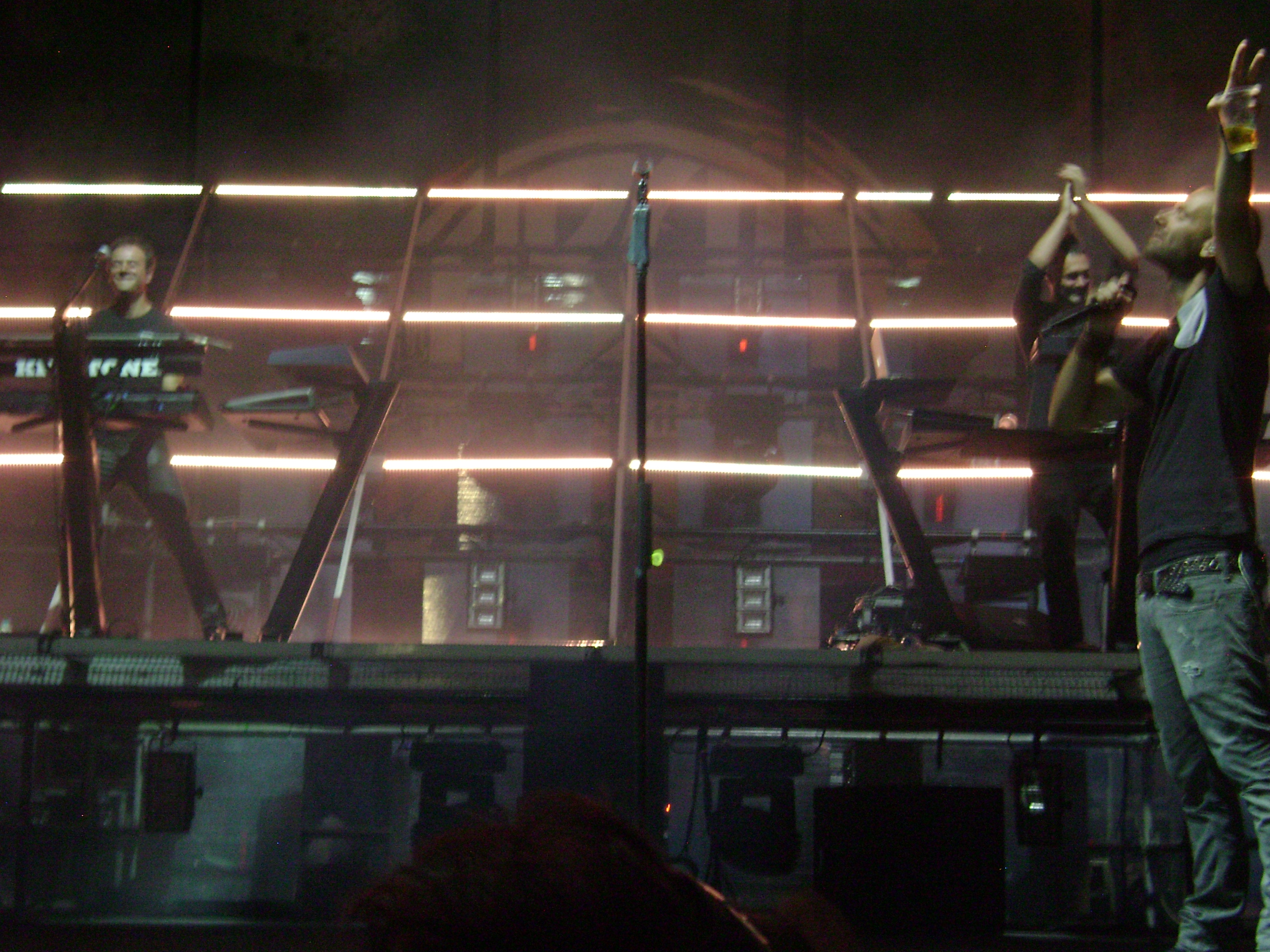
Marco Baroni, Alex Neri and Alex Uhlmann

== Discography ==
=== Albums ===
List of albums, with selected chart positions
Title	Year	Peak chart positions	
Title	Year	ITA	AUS
Non Zero Sumness	2002	15	68
The Illogical Consequence	2005	4	—
Static	2006	49	—
Planet Funk	2009	16	—
The Great Shake	2011	31	—
20:20	2020	—	—
Blooom	2026		

=== Singles ===
List of singles, with selected chart positions and certifications
Title	Year	Peak chart positions									Certifications (sales thresholds)	Album
Title	Year	ITA	AUS	FIN	FRA	GER	IRE	NLD	SWI	UK	Certifications (sales thresholds)	Album
"Chase the Sun"	2001	25	32	20	100	61	22	75	93	5	BPI: Silver	Non Zero Sumness
"Inside All the People"	2001	9	—	—	—	—	—	—	—	81		Non Zero Sumness
"Who Said (Stuck in the UK)"	2002	—	17	—	—	—	—	—	—	36		Non Zero Sumness
"The Switch"	2003	19	59	—	74	—	—	—	—	52		Non Zero Sumness
"One Step Closer" (featuring Jim Kerr)	2003	24	—	—	—	—	—	—	—	—		Non Zero Sumness Plus One
"Everyday"	2005	—	—	—	—	—	—	—	—	—		The Illogical Consequence
"Stop Me"	2005	16	—	—	—	—	—	—	—	—		The Illogical Consequence
"It's Your Time"	2006	—	—	—	—	—	—	—	—	—		Static
"Static"	2007	—	—	—	—	—	—	—	—	—		Static
"Lemonade"	2009	17	—	—	—	—	—	—	—	—		Planet Funk
"Another Sunrise"	2011	—	—	—	—	—	—	—	—	—		The Great Shake
"These Boots Are Made for Walkin'"	2011	10	—	—	—	—	—	—	—	—		The Great Shake
"Nights in White Satin"	2024	—	—	—	—	—	—	—	—	—		Blooom
"I Get A Rush"	2025	—	—	—	—	—	—	—	—	—		Blooom
"Feel Everything"	2026											Blooom
"—" denotes releases that did not chart
