= Shiver Me Timbers =

Shiver My timbers (or My) Timbers may refer to:

- Shiver my timbers, an exclamation
- Shiver My Timbers (1931), an Our Gang short
- Shiver Me Timbers! (1934), a Popeye the Sailor cartoon short
- "Shiver Me Timbers", a song on a 1974 studio album The Heart of Saturday Night by Tom Waits
- Shiver Me Timbers, a 2025 British film directed by Paul Stephen Mann

== See also ==
- Tom and Jerry: Shiver Me Whiskers, a 2006 American direct-to-video animated film
