= Shivers (surname) =

Shivers is a surname. Notable people with the surname include:

- Allan Shivers (1907–1985), Texas politician
- Chris Shivers (born 1978), top-rated bull rider
- Coyote Shivers (born 1965), musician and actor
- Jason Shivers (born 1982), defensive back in the Canadian Football League
- John Shivers (Medal of Honor) (1830–?), U.S. Marine and Medal of Honor recipient
- John Shivers (sound designer), American theatrical sound designer
- John D. Shivers Jr., member of the Ohio House of Representatives
- Joseph Shivers, American chemist who lived in West Chester, Pennsylvania
- Louise Shivers, author and writer-in-residence at Augusta State University, Augusta, Georgia
- Olin Shivers, creator of the Scheme shell scsh.
- Roy Shivers (born 1941), the General Manager of the Saskatchewan Roughriders of the Canadian Football League
- Wes Shivers (born 1977), American professional mixed martial arts (MMA) fighter

== See also ==
- Shivers (disambiguation)
