= Mama Lover (song) =

2011 single by Serebro

Single by Serebro

from the album Mama Lover
- Released: 15 September 2011
- Recorded: 2011
- Genre: Dance-pop; nu-disco
- Length: 4:02 (Album Version); 3:29 (Radio Edit)
- Label: Ego Music; Universal Music
- Songwriters: Maxim Fadeev; Olga Seryabkina
- Producer: Maxim Fadeev

Serebro singles chronology
"Davay derzhat'sya za ruki" (2010)	"Mama Lover" (2011)	"Gun" (2012)

"Mama Lover" (Russian: Мама Люба, romanized: Mama Lyuba) is a song by Russian group Serebro, which was released as the lead single from their second studio album of the same name. The song was written by member Olga Seryabkina and co-written and produced by Maxim Fadeev. It was released on 15 September 2011 by Monolit Records and Ego. "Mama Lover" received positive reviews from music critics, praising the catchiness and fun vibe towards the song. Commercially, the song is one of the group's most successful charting singles, peaking in countries including Russia, Italy, Belgium, the Czech Republic and Spain.

The music video was released on 15 September 2011 as an exclusive of Ello.com. The music video received critical acclaim from many critics, noting the simplicity of the video and the girls for being edgy and provocative. "Mama Lover" is considered Serebro's most popular song, since it has been featured in a lot of press releases.

== Background ==
"Mama Lover" is Serebro's eighth single. The single was originally released on 8 August 2011. However, when it was announced that a music video was going to be released, a Russian release was also announced. There are two official versions; the English version and the Russian version. Both versions were released as a digital download.

== Reception ==
=== Recognition ===
"Mama Lover" is Serebro's most popular single to date, having been featured in different press releases around the world. Diana Guglielmini said about the single, "And their single Mama Lover is the new summer hit: a song first released in August 2011 but that only just arrived in Italy. The video is currently a huge hit all over the Internet because the three girls, scantily clad and showing quite the erotic attitude are really easy on the eyes. That's why the younger generation- although not exclusively- is having way more fun watching the video than listening to this new hit." She then continued saying, "[The] Serebro are extremely close to capturing markets outside of Russia as well."

An Italian magazine wrote that the single reached 20 million views on YouTube and there are already more than 250 parodies of the single being performed. The song is also the group's first single to be released on iTunes.

=== Critical ===
Many critics have labelled the song as the group's signature song. Corriere.it, Corriere della Sera's website compared the group and the song to Russian group t.A.T.u. and their single "All The Things She Said". Excitenews.es described the song as "catchy and danceable" and finished saying, "A song that you can already hear on dance floors and that will surely be the soundtrack of way more than a simple road-trip this summer." A Spanish magazine The Vanguardia described the song as a "fun, sensual and spicy". The song has been labelled one of the best summer songs of 2012.

=== Commercial response ===
"Mama Lover" peaked at number 15 in TopHit's "Radio Hits Russia Weekly Chart". The Russian-language version of the song "Mama Lyuba" peaked at number 62 in the same chart.

"Mama Lover" became the group's first single to chart outside of the Russian Federation since Song #1. The song debuted at number 45 on the Spanish Singles Chart. It rose to number 34, but later peaked at number 25. The song is currently placed at number 60 on the Czech Republic Singles Chart. The song peaked at number 7 on the Italian Singles Chart, later being certified platinum by the Federation of the Italian Music Industry for digital sales exceeding 30,000 units in Italy. It also debuted at number 22 on the Belgium Singles Chart (Flanders), and at number 6 on the Belgium Dance Charts.

The song was released in the United States and Canada not long after its original release. The song entered the US Dance/Electronic Songs chart at number thirty-eight and lasted for as sole week. The group became the first Russian act to chart on the Billboard chart since fellow Russian duo t.A.T.u's single "All About Us".

== Music video ==
A music video was released on YouTube on 15 September 2011. However, the Russian version of the song was released instead of the English version, although the latter was the official single release. The music video features Elena, Anastasia and Olga driving through Russian streets, through a live-camera-shot based film. It received some censorship, as it features Olga swearing and Elena showing her underwear, even if it is pixilated in the first place. It is currently Russia's most viewed music video to date, having over 20 million views on YouTube. The video has at times been criticized because of the girls' actions and the presence of condoms, swearing and Olga's careless driving.

The English version of "Mama Lover" was released on YouTube.

== Track listing ==
Digital download

(Released on 15 September 2011)

1. "Mama Lover" - 4:04
2. "Мама Люба (Mama Lyuba)" - 4:05

iTunes Remixes Single

1. "Mama Lover" (Мама Люба) - 4:02
2. "Mama Lover (English Version)" - 4:02
3. "Mama Lover (Matrick Remix)" - 5:46
4. "Mama Lover (Slava Inside Remix)" - 5:42
5. "Mama Lover (DJ V1t & DJ Johnny Clash Remix)" - 6:11
6. "Mama Lover (DJ Amor Remix)" - 3:54
7. "Mama Lover (DJ Prado Remix)" - 7:15
8. "Mama Lover (Digital Nova Remix)" - 3:37
9. "Mama Lover (DJ Chixer Remix)" - 3:36
10. "Mama Lover (DJ La Remix)" - 4:04

New Zealand Remix Single

1. "Mama Lover" (Dab & Sissa Radio Edit) - 2:55
2. "Mama Lover" (Dab & Sissa Remix) - 5:51
3. "Mama Lover" (The Cube Guys Remix) - 7:04

Italian Remix EP

1. "Mama Lover" (Radio Edit) - 3:29
2. "Mama Lover" (Extended Edit) - 5:32
3. "Mama Lover" (Gary Caos Remix) - 6:57
4. "Mama Lover" (Gary Caos Dub Mix) - 6:19
5. "Mama Lover" - 4:02

UK Remixes EP

1. "Mama Lover" (Wawa Remix Edit) - 3:29
2. "Mama Lover" (Wawa Remix) - 5:32
3. "Mama Lover" (Wawa Dub Mix) - 6:57
4. "Mama Lover" (Lockout's Club Remix) - 6:19
5. "Mama Lover" (Jorg Schmid Remix) - 4:02

== Charts ==
=== Weekly charts ===
Weekly chart performance for "Mama Lover"
Chart (2011–2012)	Peak position
Belgium (Ultratop Flanders)	6
Belgium Dance (Ultratop Flanders)	1
CIS Airplay (TopHit)	8
Czech Republic Airplay (ČNS IFPI)	58
Italy (FIMI)	6
Italy Airplay (EarOne)	1
Japan (Japan Hot 100)	49
Romania (Romanian Top 100)	94
Russia Airplay (TopHit)	15
Russia (Digital (2M))	1
Spain (Promusicae)	25
Ukraine Airplay (TopHit)	78
US Hot Dance/Electronic Songs (Billboard)	38

Weekly chart performance for "Mama Lyuba"
Chart (2011)	Peak position
CIS Airplay (TopHit)	44
Russia Airplay (TopHit)	62
Ukraine Airplay (TopHit)	20

=== Year-end charts ===
2011 year-end chart performance for "Mama Lover"
Chart (2011)	Position
CIS (TopHit)	99
Russia Airplay (TopHit)	136
Ukraine Airplay (TopHit)	71

2012 year-end chart performance for "Mama Lover"
Chart (2012)	Position
Italy (FIMI)	32
Italy Airplay (EarOne)	17
Ukraine Airplay (TopHit)	76

== Release history ==
Release dates for "Mama Lover"
Country	Date	Label
Russia	15 September 2011	Monolit
Worldwide	11 December 2011	Ego Music
Italy	30 March 2012	Ego Music

== Personnel ==
- Anastasia Karpova – vocals
- Elena Temnikova – vocals
- Olga Seryabkina – vocals, lyrics
- Maxim Fadeev – songwriter, producer
