= Chase the Sun (song) =

2000 single by Planet Funk

Single by Planet Funk

from the album Non Zero Sumness
- Released: 29 January 2001 (UK)
- Recorded: May 2000
- Studio: Souled Out! (Naples, Italy)
- Genre: Electronic dance music, electronica
- Length: 3:41
- Label: Bustin' Loose; Virgin
- Songwriters: Marco Baroni; Domenico "GG" Canu; Sergio Della Monica; Simon Duffy; Alex Neri
- Producer: Planet Funk

Planet Funk singles chronology
"Chase the Sun" (2001)	"Inside All the People" (2002)

"Chase the Sun" is a song by Italian electronic music group Planet Funk with vocals from Finnish singer Auli Kokko. The melody is taken from Ennio Morricone's tune "Alla luce del giorno" (English: "In Daylight") from the score of the 1969 film Metti, una sera a cena ("English: Think About a Night at Dinner"). The song was released across Europe in 2000 and 2001 as the lead single from Planet Funk's debut studio album, Non Zero Sumness (2002). "Chase the Sun" peaked at number five in the United Kingdom and additionally reached the top five in Greece, Romania, and Spain. The song has since become well-known for its usage in darts competitions.

== Music video ==
The video was directed by Stuart Rideout and won Best Dance Video at the 2001 MTV Europe Awards.

== Track listings ==
Italian CD single

1. "Chase the Sun" (extended club mix) – 7:42
2. "Chase the Sun" (instrumental mix) – 8:00
3. "Chase the Sun" (radio edit) – 3:47

UK and Australian CD single; UK cassette single

1. "Chase the Sun" (radio edit) – 3:36
2. "Chase the Sun" (extended club mix) – 7:42
3. "Chase the Sun" (instrumental) – 8:00

UK 12-inch single

A1. "Chase the Sun" (extended club mix) – 7:42
B1. "Chase the Sun" (instrumental) – 8:00
B2. "Chase the Sun" (instrument-appella) – 3:47

French CD single

1. "Chase the Sun" (radio edit) – 3:42
2. "Chase the Sun" (extended club mix) – 7:57

== Credits and personnel ==
Credits are taken from the UK CD single liner notes.

Studio

- Recorded in May 2000 at Souled Out! Studios (Naples, Italy)

Personnel

- Marco Baroni – writing, keys
- Domenico "GG" Canu – writing, guitar, keys
- Sergio Della Monica – writing, guitar, keys
- Simon Duffy – writing, engineering, programming
- Alex Neri – writing, keys
- Auli Kokko – vocals
- Alessandro Sommella – guitar
- Andrea Cozzani – bass
- Planet Funk – production, mixing

== Charts ==
=== Weekly charts ===
Chart (2001)	Peak position
Australia (ARIA)	32
Australian Club Chart (ARIA)	1
Australian Dance (ARIA)	5
Belgium (Ultratop 50 Flanders)	29
Belgium (Ultratop 50 Wallonia)	25
Europe (Eurochart Hot 100)	28
Finland (Suomen virallinen lista)	20
France (SNEP)	100
Germany (GfK)	61
Greece (IFPI Greece)	2
Ireland (IRMA)	22
Ireland Dance (IRMA)	7
Italy (FIMI)	25
Netherlands (Single Top 100)	75
Romania (Romanian Top 100)	4
Scottish Singles Sales (Official Charts)	4
Spain (Promusicae)	3
Switzerland (Schweizer Hitparade)	93
UK Singles (Official Charts)	5
UK Dance (Official Charts)	4

=== Year-end charts ===
Chart (2001)	Position
Australian Club Chart (ARIA)	19
Romania (Romanian Top 100)	40
Spain (AFYVE)	19
UK Singles (OCC)	134

Chart (2002)	Position
Brazil (Crowley)	36

== Certifications ==
Region	Certification	Certified units/sales
United Kingdom (BPI)	Gold	400,000^{‡}
^{‡} Sales+streaming figures based on certification alone.

== Release history ==
Region	Date	Formats(s)	Label(s)	Ref.
Italy	2000	CD	Bustin' Loose	
United Kingdom	29 January 2001	12-inch vinyl; CD; cassette	Bustin' Loose; Virgin	
Spain	February 2001	12-inch vinyl; CD	Vendetta	
Australia	2 April 2001	CD	Virgin	

== Usage ==
"Chase the Sun" is known for its usage in professional darts games. It is used by Sky Sports for their coverage of darts in the UK, when it is played in the auditorium during the advert breaks of Sky-owned tournaments, and it has developed a cult following amongst darts fans, who tend to rave and chant during the breaks. In 2005, the PDC World Darts Championship approached Planet Funk about using the song to promote the event. Although darts was not well-known in Italy at the time, the group quickly agreed to let the PDC use the song, and they have enjoyed hearing the song represent darts competitions since then, so much so that they have become fans of the sport.

The song was used by CBBC in early 2001 for its continuity links. The Colorado Avalanche of the National Hockey League uses the song as a goal song when scoring at home. England used the song as a goal song during the 2026 FIFA World Cup.

== See also ==
- List of number-one club tracks of 2001 (Australia)
