= Static (Planet Funk album) =

Studio album by Planet Funk
- Released: 27 October 2006
- Length: 41:27
- Label: EMI (Italy)
- Producer: Planet Funk

Planet Funk chronology
The Illogical Consequence (2005)	Static (2006)	Planet Funk (2009)

Static is the third album by the Italian dance group Planet Funk. It was released in 2006 through EMI. Vocal parts are interpreted by Luke Allen, except track 10, which is sung by Jovanotti.

== Track listing ==
No.	Title	Writer(s)	Length
1.	"It's Your Time"	L. Allen	3:01
2.	"Magic Number"	M. Baroni, S. Della Monica	3:43
3.	"Swallow"	M. Baroni, S. Della Monica	2:55
4.	"In the Beginning"	M. Baroni, S. Della Monica	4:07
5.	"If We Try"	M. Baroni, S. Della Monica	3:09
6.	"Static"	M. Baroni, S. Della Monica	4:57
7.	"We Turn"	M. Baroni, S. Della Monica	4:24
8.	"Running Through My Head"	M. Baroni, S. Della Monica	5:53
9.	"Tears"	A. Neri, A. Tepper	5:13
10.	"Big Fish"	D. Canu, H. Harris, Jovanotti	4:05

== Charts ==
Chart performance for Static
Chart (2006)	Peak position
Italian Albums (FIMI)	49
