= Sila Tryokh =

Studio album by Serebro
- Released: 27 May 2016
- Recorded: 2013–2016
- Genre: Europop
- Length: 60:19
- Language: English (10 Tracks); Russian (6 Tracks)
- Label: Monolit Records
- Producer: Maxim Fadeev; Yellow Claw; Max Oude Weernink; Thom Bridges; Danil Babichev; DJ M.E.G.

Serebro chronology
Mama Lover (2012)	Sila Tryokh (2016)	11 (2024)

Singles from Sila Tryokh
- 1. "Kiss" Released: 29 April 2015; 2. "Pereputala" Released: 21 May 2015; 3. "Otpusti Menya" Released: 27 October 2015; 4. "Chocolate" Released: 18 April 2016; 5. "My Money" Released: 19 December 2016

Sila Tryokh (Russian: Сила трёх, translated: Power of Three) is the third studio album of Russian girl group Serebro. It was released 27 May 2016 by Monolit Records in Russia.

== Background ==
Information that the Serebro team will release a third studio album, appeared in late August 2015. Future plate was planned to present the 30 October 2015 at a big solo concert of group "Izvestiya Hall then" Moscow club. Later all the material the girls had been working on, which had the working title of "925" in honor of the samples of the precious material, were stolen and the release was delayed.

On 27 April 2016, iTunes opened pre-order of the upcoming album, called "Сила трёх". The title translated into English, is 'Power of Three', which is reference to the number of singers in the bands formation. The disc includes 16 tracks, most of which had come out as singles. Songs from the album, "Malo Tebya" and "Ya Tebya Ne Otdam" have become hits and were able to reach the top 5 main chart Tophit, and the track "Mi Mi Mi" became sensational in the world music market. The album also included a joint single "Ugar" with Russian musician, DJ M.E.G., as well as the collab "Blood Diamond", with the Dutch EDM production team Yellow Claw, previously included on their debut album, Blood For Mercy.

The entire album was recorded material as part of a trio of Olga Seryabkina, Polina Favorskaya and Daria Shashina. The song "Chocolate" was the only song recorded with the participation of Katya Kischuk, replacing Daria Shashina after her departure from the group. The track "My Money" was recorded exclusively by Olga Seryabkina under the solo project by Molly.

== Track listing ==
No.	Title	Lyrics	Music	Length
1.	"Malo Tebya"	Olga Seryabkina; Maxim Fadeev	Fadeev	3:45
2.	"Kiss"	Seryabkina	Fadeev	3:26
3.	"Mi Mi Mi"	Seryabkina; Fadeev	Fadeev	3:13
4.	"Pereputala"	Seryabkina; Fadeev	Fadeev	3:35
5.	"Chocolate" (European Version)	Seryabkina	Fadeev	3:33
6.	"My Money" (featuring Molly)	Seryabkina	Maxim Fadeev	3:49
7.	"Sexy Ass"	Seryabkina	Fadeev	3:41
8.	"Blood Diamond" (featuring Yellow Claw)	Eyelar Mirzazadeh; Thom Bridges	Yellow Claw; Max Oude Weernink; Bridges	3:10
9.	"Ne Nado Bolnee"	Seryabkina; Fadeev	Fadeev	4:30
10.	"See You Again"	Seryabkina	Danil Babichev	4:07
11.	"Otpusti Menya"	Seryabkina; Fadeev	Fadeev	3:52
12.	"Get Lost with Me"	Seryabkina	Babichev	3:53
13.	"Ya Tebya Ne Otdam"	Seryabkina; Fadeev	Fadeev	4:11
14.	"Storm"	Seryabkina	Babichev	4:16
15.	"Ugar" (featuring DJ M.E.G.)	Seryabkina	DJ M.E.G.; Fadeev	3:40
16.	"My Money" (Remix; featuring Molly)	Seryabkina	Fadeev	3:41

- Note(s): The international edition of the album doesn't include «Kiss», «Mi Mi Mi», «Chocolate» and both versions of «My Money» but are available to download as singles

== Charts ==
Chart (2025)	Peak position
Lithuanian Albums (AGATA)	48
