= Malo tebya =

2013 single by Serebro

Single by Serebro

from the album Sila tryokh
- Language: Russian
- Released: May 14, 2013
- Genre: Pop
- Length: 3:45
- Label: Monolith Records
- Composer(s): Maxim Fadeev
- Lyricist(s): Olga Seryabkina; Maxim Fadeev
- Producer(s): Maxim Fadeev

Serebro singles chronology
"Sexy Ass" (2013)	"Malo tebya" (2013)	"Mi Mi Mi" (2013)

"Malo tebya" (Russian: Мало тебя, lit. 'You're not enough' or 'Lack of you') is a single by the Russian pop group Serebro, the second single from their album Sila tryokh, released on May 14, 2013. The premiere of the song took place on the TopHit, where the track managed to reach the top 5 of the radio chart, staying on the chart for 31 weeks. The song became a big hit in CIS countries.

== Music video ==
The video, directed by Igor Shmelev, premiered on July 10, 2013 on the YouTube channel of the label "ELLA", from where it was later deleted. The clip is a cut of shots with the soloists in an apartment in their underwear. In the video, Elena Temnikova, Olga Seryabkina, and Anastasia Karpova are shown half-naked, lying in the bathroom with men, shaving their hair, throwing kittens on the bed, performing various fetishes, pouring milk, and lying their faces on salt in a manner similar to snorting cocaine. Additionally, here is a separate storyline with Elena and Olga, where they sit on the bed, spit cherries in each other's mouths and smear berries on the body, imitating blood. In the final part of the video, Elena and Anastasia are walking down the street, and at the same moment Olga gets out of the car in a transparent twist and walks forward while the girls catch up with her. At the moment, the video is present in several copies on the official channel of Maxim Fadeev. The most popular version of the video has over 22 million views, and the backstage from the filming, published on the band's official channel (later moved to Fadeev's channel), has over 10 million views.

== Reception ==
The band received criticism of their music video domestically due to depictions of overly explicit scenes, cruelty to animals, and promotion of same-sex relationships. Following her departure from the band in 2014, Temnikova complained about the way that she was treated on set during the filming of the video, stating that the scene where cherries are spit into her mouth from Seryabkina's mouth was "unhygenic".

The song was labelled "Best song of the year" by Real MusicBox Awards in 2013, and in 2014, won the same title under the Muz-TV Awards.
