= Mi Mi Mi =

Single by Serebro

from the album Sila tryokh and Chico Loco
- Released: 14 June 2013
- Genre: Bubblegum pop; electro swing
- Length: 3:14
- Label: Ego Music; Monolit (CIS); Casablanca (US); WMG (IDN)
- Songwriters: Maxim Fadeev; Olga Seryabkina
- Producers: Maxim Fadeev; Ilario Drago (exec.)

Serebro singles chronology
"Malo Tebya" (2013)	"Mi Mi Mi" (2013)	"Ugar" (2013)

Music video
- "Mi Mi Mi" on YouTube

"Mi Mi Mi" is a song by Russian girl group Serebro from their third studio album Sila tryokh. It was released on 14 June 2013 in Russia as a digital download, while an accompanying music video premiered on 10 June 2013. Although not a commercial success worldwide, only peaking at number 11 in Italy, the song slowly gained popularity for its catchiness and summer atmosphere.

== Composition ==
"Mi Mi Mi" is a dance-pop and electro swing song with eurodance influences. The song features a house rhythm and a prominent saxophone riff that serves as its main instrumental. Critics compared the riff to "Mr. Saxobeat" (2011) by Romanian singer Alexandra Stan. It is often labeled as a perky summer dance song. "Mi Mi Mi" has been compared to "Whip It" from American rapper, Nicki Minaj for its powerful blend of electronic house beat and pop melody.

== Commercial performance ==
While the song did not make waves in the group's home country, it was successful in Italy. It was sent to Italian radio following its release and debuted at #17 in Italy on 18 June 2013. It remained in the top 20 for 8 weeks, peaking at #11, becoming the group's second and last song to chart in the country.

== Charts ==
=== Weekly charts ===
Chart (2013)	Peak position
Belgium (Ultratip Bubbling Under Wallonia)	22
Italy (FIMI)	11
Japan Hot 100 (Billboard)	88
Netherlands (Dutch Top 40)	7
Netherlands (Single Top 100)	8
Romania (Airplay 100)	50
South Korea (Gaon International Singles)	18
US Hot Dance/Electronic Songs (Billboard)	39

=== Year-end charts ===
Chart (2013)	Position
Netherlands (Dutch Top 40)	49
Netherlands (Single Top 100)	59

== Controversy ==
In 2018, Serebro accused K-pop girl group Momoland of plagiarizing "Mi Mi Mi" with their song "Bboom Bboom". Shinsadong Tiger, the song's producer, denied the allegations, saying "the bass line [is] commonly heard in retro house or electro swing genres, as well as the 4-stanza chord."

== In popular culture ==
- The song is used in the film Spy being played in the club, as Cooper finds out that Lia (the woman who tricked Ford in Paris) is the one making the offer for the bomb.
- The song is also played on various television shows in South Korea. Some of the most popular are Exo Showtime, EXID Showtime and Running Man. This has helped the song to become a long-running hit in that country, staying in the Gaon International Chart over one year and a half since its release.
- Shae's song "Aku Suka Kamu" adapted the song and used the tune of the song. Among other changes in the sung melody, the first interval of the chorus is changed from a semitone to two semitones in the vocals, while the saxophone backing still uses the same melody as the original.
- The song is used in the 2015 film Jem and the Holograms, when Jerrica, Kimber, Aja and Shana get makeovers from Starlight productions after arriving in LA.
- The song was covered in Japanese by J-pop group MAX in 2015.
- The song is featured in the dance rhythm game Just Dance 2019, covered by Hit the Electro Beat.

== Music video ==
By 10 June 2015, the video was viewed more than 70 million times. The video landed on Top Chart Mexico and in the Top-40 on М1 Ukraine. The video also landed in the Top-11 on the Russian television channel RU.MUSIC. In Italy, the video stayed on the iTunes Video Chart for several months. The video has more than 100 million views, which meant a lot for a Russian artist.
