= Non Zero Sumness =

Studio album by Planet Funk
- Released: 3 March 2002
- Recorded: 2000–2002
- Genre: Electronic; alternative rock; big beat; house
- Length: 60:35
- Label: Ultralab

Planet Funk chronology
Non Zero Sumness (2002)	The Illogical Consequence (2005)

Non Zero Sumness is the debut album released by Italian dance music group Planet Funk. First released on 3 March 2002 in the band's home country by Bustin' Loose Recordings, it was rereleased in the United Kingdom and the rest of Europe on 18 August 2003 by Sony Music.

The band also released a limited-edition version of the album called Non Zero Sumness Plus One, containing the bonus track "One Step Closer" sung by Jim Kerr, which is a vocal version of the instrumental "Where Is the Max".

Track 11 has a hidden track, entitled "Rosa Blu", which begins at the 7:05 marker.

In 2020, the band's current label, Just Entertainment, reissued the album on vinyl.

== Track listing ==
No.	Title	Length
1.	"Where Is the Max"	4:40
2.	"Chase the Sun"	3:53
3.	"All Man's Land"	5:32
4.	"The Switch"	4:41
5.	"Inside All the People"	4:57
6.	"Under the Rain"	6:23
7.	"Paraffin"	4:30
8.	"Piano Piano"	2:31
9.	"Tightrope Artist"	5:16
10.	"Who Said (Stuck in the UK)"	3:45
11.	"The Waltz / Rosa Blu"	14:27
Total length:		60:35

== Personnel ==
=== Planet Funk ===
- Marco Baroni – keyboards, piano, production, engineering, mixing
- Alex Neri – keyboards, drum programming, production
- Sergio Della Monica – bass, guitars, production
- Domenico "GG" Canu – guitars, production
- Alessandro Sommella – guitars, bass, production

=== Other personnel ===
- Auli Kokko – vocals (2)
- Sally Doherty – vocals (3, 6, 11), flute (3)
- Dan Black – vocals (4, 5, 7, 10), guitars (4, 5, 10)
- Raiz – vocals (9)
- Simon Duffy – keyboards, drum programming, engineer, mixing
- Charlie Burchill – guitars (6)
- Andrea Cozzani – bass (2–5)
- Hugh Harris – bass (9)
- Simon Hanson – drums

== Charts ==
Chart performance for Non Zero Sumness
Chart (2002–2003)	Peak position
Australian Albums (ARIA)	68
Italian Albums (FIMI)	15
