= Shiver my timbers =

Exclamation phrase

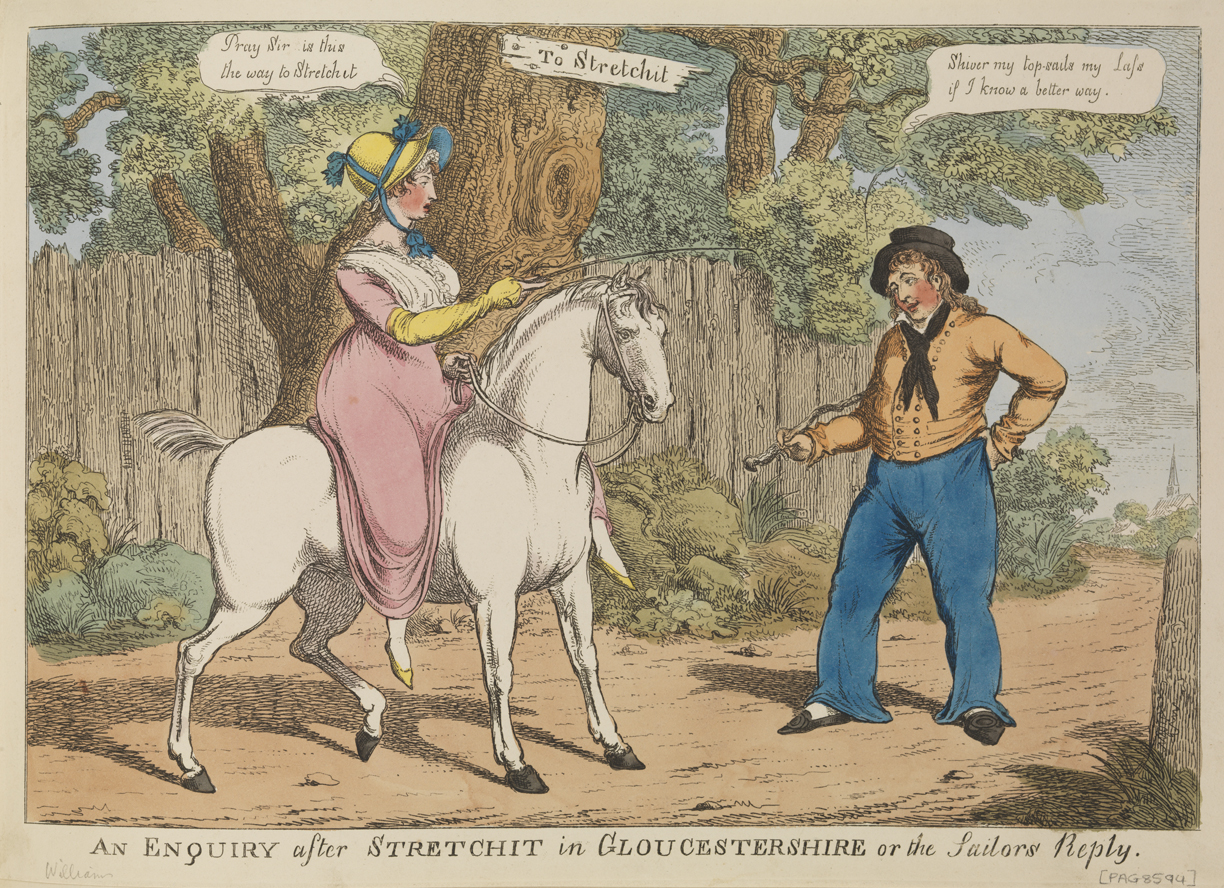
Pray, Sir, is this the way to Stretchit? "Shiver my top-sails, my Laſs, if I know a better way."

"Shiver me timbers" (or "shiver my timbers" in Standard English) is an exclamation in the form of a mock oath usually attributed to the speech of pirates in works of fiction. It is employed as a literary device by authors to express shock, surprise, or annoyance. The phrase is based on real nautical slang and is a reference to the timbers, which are the wooden support frames of a sailing ship. In heavy seas, ships would be lifted up and pounded down so hard as to "shiver" the timbers, startling the sailors. Such an exclamation was meant to convey a feeling of fear and awe, similar to, "Well, blow me down!", or, "May God strike me alive and well". Since on the high seas the ship was the sailors' 'world', it may also be interpreted as an exclamation for "shake my world" as the subject being referred to could be, or may be considered a potentially 'world shaking' event. In a modern context, its use is mainly limited to humorous exaggeration or in the form of an idiom.

== History ==
Although the Oxford English Dictionary says the expression "shiver my timbers" probably first appeared in a published work by Frederick Marryat called Jacob Faithful (1835), the phrase actually appeared in print as early as 1795, in a serial publication called "Tomahawk, or Censor General", which gives an "extract of a new MS tragedy called 'Opposition'." In the words of the "old sailor":

"Peace? Shiver my timbers! what a noise ye make – ye seem to be fonder of peace than ye be of quiet."
...
"Lather me! – Shiver my timbers. if so be he comes athwart me – I'll soon lower his topsails for him – Here's King George and old England for ever!"

The phrase appears in a news article showing that the phrase was in use at the time.

"yarn about the Emp'ror o' Rushy and we o' the Talavera; and shiver my timbers if I shall ever forget it ..."

The Argus Newspaper Archive records the use in the news event as: "As for nine French men-of-war are laying along side us jist now, and overhauling our rigging and tactics, splinter my timbers into shivers if I don't think they are all buccaneers..." would indicate the meaning of "shivers" as the breaking into wedges, small pieces or slivers. Alternatively the word "slivers" itself (meaning a small, thin, narrow piece of something cut or split off a larger piece, which also defines a "splinter"), may be the word "shivers" expresses. The exact phrase is used earlier on the same page "Here's a breeze in a bumboat! shiver my timbers and top-lights, what will our Majesty's loblolly-boys say...". While the exact meaning may be different, the use was still that of an exclamation.

The expression is a derivative of actual 18th century nautical slang, when the phrase "timbers!" or "my timbers!" meant an exclamation (cf. "my goodness!") as can be seen in Poor Jack, a song from 1789 by Charles Dibdin.

The opening of the phrase, 'shiver my..', also predates Jacob Faithful with the following lines from John O'Keeffe's 1791 comic play Wild Oats an earlier example:

Harry: I say it's false.
John: False! Shiver my hulk, Mr. Buckskin, if you wore a lion's skin I'd curry you for this.

=== Pirate stereotypes ===
"Shiver my timbers" was most famously popularized by the archetypal pirate Long John Silver in Robert Louis Stevenson's Treasure Island (1883). Silver used the phrase seven times, as well as variations such as "shiver my sides", "shiver my soul" and "shake up your timbers". Another pirate, Israel Hands, also uses the phrase at one point.

Marryat and Stevenson both wrote Victorian fiction using standard grammar, even when their characters were pirates. The use of "me" instead of "my", which is common to many British regional accents, has appeared in popular culture such as with Popeye; one of his earliest cartoons from 1934 is entitled Shiver Me Timbers! The phrase was also commonly used in Arthur Ransome's Swallows and Amazons books, where it was said at least once in almost every book, most commonly by "Amazon Pirate" Nancy Blackett. Robert Newton notably uses the original "shiver my timbers" in the 1950 RKO-Disney British adaptation of Treasure Island.

== In popular culture ==
- "Shiver me timbers" and "blow me down" are commonly said by Popeye. One 1931 cartoon shot from the Popeye the Sailor series was titled Shiver Me Timbers!.
- "Shiver me timbers" was expressed by elite financial advisor Esme Squalor and main antagonist Count Olaf, in season 3 of A Series of Unfortunate Events, with explanation of definition by character Lemony Snicket.
- In the popular American cartoon SpongeBob SquarePants, Mr. Krabs is heard using the phrase "shiver me timbers" often.
- The opening number of the 1996 Brian Henson film Muppet Treasure Island is entitled "Shiver My Timbers." Several of the variants used in the original book are present in the chorus, including "shiver my soul," "shiver my bones," "shiver my sides," and "shiver my sails."
- In the Canadian animated action-adventure cartoon series ReBoot, the software pirate captain Gavin Capacitor uses the pirate catchphrase mutation "Shiver me templates!".
- In the Monk episode "Mr. Monk Is On the Air", Steven Weber's radio jockey character says a variation on the exclamation ("jiggle me timbers") on the air as his new catchphrase and this is revealed to be an important plot device in the episode.
- In the 1967 film The Fearless Vampire Killers, Professor Abronsius uses this expression when observing (via telescope) the vampirised Yoyneh Shagal climb up the outside of his own inn and enter the bedroom of his maid by means of the window.
- Tom Waits' 1974 album The Heart of Saturday Night includes his song by this name.
- In the game Paladins, the character named Barik uses the cry "shiver me timbers!" as an emote.
- The founder of the scam baiting website 419eater.com, Michael Berry, goes by the alias "Shiver Metimbers".
