= Shiver (novel) =

2021 mystery by Allie Reynolds

- Author: Allie Reynolds
- Language: English
- Genre: Thriller; Mystery
- Published: 2021
- Publisher: Headline, G.P. Putnam's Sons
- Publication place: United Kingdom
- Media type: Print (hardback, paperback), E-book, Audiobook
- Pages: 432 pages
- ISBN: 147227024X First edition hardback, UK

Shiver is a 2021 British mystery thriller and the debut novel of Allie Reynolds, a former freestyle snowboarder. Published in the United Kingdom through Headline, the novel shifts between the past and present to tell the story of arguments and rivalries between competitive snowboarders that may have led to murder.

== Synopsis ==
Note: The novel cuts between the past and present. This section will be laid out in chronological format.

=== Past ===
Milla is an ambitious young snowboarder whose reputation for giving great performances has only been growing. While she has yet to land any lucrative sponsorships, her participation in a prestigious competition in the French Alps could change that. At the competition she meets several people, some of whom were already familiar to her. Milla is particularly dazzled to meet Saskia and Curtis, sibling athletes and celebrities in the snowboarding world. She comes in contact with Saskia's girlfriend Odette, as well as Curtis's friends Brent and Dale. Despite sharing a strong attraction with Curtis, Milla begins a brief physical relationship with Brent during the competition. Dale begins a relationship with Heather, a waitress at a local bar. Saskia proves to be a devious and cunning frenemy. She deliberately tries and succeeds in ruining Milla's practices and trial runs, fearing that the woman may upstage her. Curtis is aware of her actions but makes little move to stop her, as he believes that her actions are limited to relatively minor offenses and refuses to acknowledge otherwise. Milla also witnesses Saskia sabotage Odette's runs.

Fed up, Milla decides to play her own trick and invites Saskia to party with her the night before they are to compete. The two drink and Milla sleeps with Saskia. The following morning, she drugs Saskia's drink with sleeping pills, intending for it to merely throw the woman off her game by slowing her reflexes. Milla doesn't account for Brent discovering that she had sex with Saskia.

Brent later runs into Saskia, who takes the opportunity to taunt him. Angry, he strikes her and causes Saskia to fall and hit her head. Believing that he killed her, Brent hides Saskia's body in her snowboarding bag with the help of Heather, who had come across the scene. Curtis then arrives, trying to find Saskia so he can confront her over a scene she had caused the night before. Frustrated, he kicks the bag into a crevasse unaware that her body was inside. At the competition, Odette messes up during her run and paralyzing herself.

=== Present ===
Years later Milla has given up snowboarding and is living a far from glamorous life. She's excited when she receives an invitation to a get together at the very lodge where the competition took place many years before. Once there she is reunited with Curtis, Heather, Dale, and Brent, learning that Heather and Dale have since married. The reunion is awkward, so they eagerly take part in an icebreaker game that requires them to relinquish their phones and read off cards that have various truths written on them. Things grow tense when the cards include information about Saskia's death and her sleeping with one of them. The group discovers that their phones have been stolen and that they are now trapped at the resort. An unseen person torments the group and eventually begins to grow menacing. It's ultimately revealed that the aggressor is Odette, who had recovered and had even become a biathlete - something undiscovered by the others as they had purposely avoided trying to learn anything about her out of guilt. Odette correctly assumed that the group was responsible for Saskia's death, but thought that she had been purposefully murdered rather than killed accidentally. She had also assumed that Saskia was in love with her, unaware that Saskia only saw her as a plaything and an opponent to sabotage. The truth breaks Odette's remaining sanity. Curtis and Milla manage to survive the attack and become a couple. Milla keeps the knowledge of having drugged her water a secret and questions whether or not Brent would have been able to attack Saskia if she were not altered.

== Development ==
Reynolds began writing Shiver as a way of working from home, as her then husband frequently worked away. She chose to set the novel on a mountain as she was "obsessed with this icy white world on top of a mountain where everything depends on nature and the weather. There are all these dangers. It's a thrill-seeking world."

== Release ==
Shiver was released in hardback and ebook formats in the United Kingdom on 19 January 2021 and in the United States on 21 January through Headline and G.P. Putnam's Sons, respectively. Hachette Australia released the novel on 27 January. An audiobook adaptation narrated by Olivia Vinall was also released.

The novel has been translated into multiple languages that include French, German, and Polish.

== Adaptation ==
TV rights for Shiver were optioned in 2019 by Firebird Pictures, prior to the novel's release. Elizabeth Kilgarriff and Craig Holleworth plan to adapt it into a television series.

== Reception ==
Critical reception has been positive. Canberra Weekly and HeraldScotland both gave Shiver positive reviews. PopSugar rated the novel favorably, listing it as one of the "22 Greatest Mystery and Thrillers of 2021".
