= The Piss Shivers =

American punk rock band

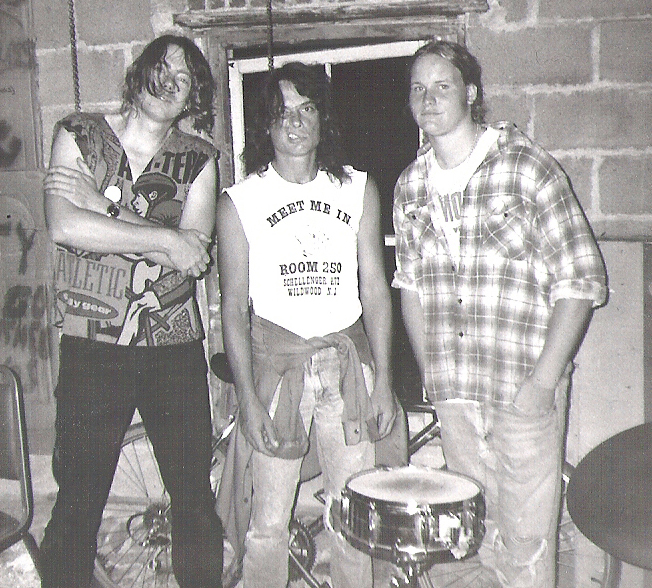
- The band's original line up: Cedric Rokkgod, Dion Blade and Bob Alper

Background information
- Origin: Boyertown, Pennsylvania, United States
- Genres: Punk rock, hardcore punk
- Years active: 1993–present
- Label: Spine Punch Music
- Members: Cedric Rokkgod; Adam Mederia
- Past members: Dion Blade; Robert Alper; Mark Fry; Dave Getzoff; Rick Wadsworth; Steve Faulkner; Chris Dwyer; Devon "tank" Wentzel"; Chris Maag
- Website: www.myspace.com/thepissshivers

The Piss Shivers are an American old school punk rock band formed in 1994. The band, which is based out of the Philadelphia suburbs, are also occasionally referred to as the "Pee Shivers" when played on the radio. Starting in the winter of 1993 singer/guitarist Cedric Crouch (a.k.a. Cedric Rokkgod) began making demo tapes with a multi track recorder and a drum machine. Realizing the limitations this created for live shows, a flesh and blood line up in the form of Dion Blade (bass) and Robert Alper (drums) soon followed. Crouch, who is the primary songwriter, has been the only constant in the group. The rest of the band, primarily bassists and drummers have been a revolving line up based on their availability to record and tour. The band has extensively played shows and toured on the east coast and released numerous recordings such as the CDs Help, My Dog's A Skinhead!, Hepped Up On Goofballs and We're Cheap Dates, and has also appeared on many compilations put out by labels from the U.S., Ireland and Japan.

== Discography ==
Albums

- Help, My Dog's A Skin Head! (1994 Spine Punch Music)
- Hepped Up on Goofballs (1997 Spine Punch Music)
- The Piss Shivers - Self-titled CD collecting both released and previously unreleased tracks (2000 AUA Records in Italy - Snaps Music)
- We Are Cheap Dates (2003 Spine Punch Music)

CD compilations

- Variety Pack (Narciscus Records)
- No Fate - World Hardcore Compilation (HG Fact records, Japan) Also appearing on this compilation are Snap-Her and Naked Aggression.
- Wood Panel Pacer Wagon with Mags (Vinyl 12" and 7" comp., 100 bands doing 30 second songs on Very Small Records) Also appearing on this compilation are Boris the Sprinkler, J. Church, Violent Society, Less Than Jake and Blanks 77.
- Sayin' bye bye to label slavery (Stink Box Records/Rotten Roll records)
- Pope Kevorkian presents ... Got A Match??? (Exploitation Records)
- No Royalties (Vinyl Comp by Bad People Records) Also appearing on this compilation are Charles Bronson Band, MK Ultra and Capitalist Casualties.
- Rumors from the Air Conditioned Tiger Pit (Rotten House Records Comp)
- Pay No Attention to What's Behind the Curtain(Stink Box Records CD comp) Also appearing on this compilation are The Cuffs.
- Best of the Best (Awesome Dawson Records CD comp) Also appearing on this compilation are Dropkick Murphy's, Blanks 77 and Showcase Showdown
- Junk Punk (Awesome Dawson Records cd comp)
- KAOS comp II ( Under the Volcano/Mother Box CD comp)
- Liverache - Tales from the Liver's Edge (double LP comp, Very Small Records). This is a comp about booze. Other featured bands include: Less Than Jake and The Wretched Ones .
- Rejected, Volume II (Rejected Records CD Comp, in Ireland) Also appearing are J. Church
- Evil Surfin Dred (Booz Records CD comp, Japan) Also appearing of the cd are The White Trash Debutantes and Krapp(UK)
- Punk For Life (Run and Hide Records) Other bands featured on this cd include; MDC, Kill The Witness and The Wretched Ones.
- The International Punk Rock 10 disc Boxed set (Meathead records) Also appearing are the commercials, The White Trash Debutantes and the Bully's

7 Inch compilations

- Berks County '98 (Rockin' House Records)
- Contents Under Pressure (Rockin' House Records) Also appearing are the FUX

== Other media ==
- The Piss Shivers appear in the book "Anecdote, Stories From The Road" Compiled and edited by Rachael Almada (published by Bodach Press)
- The Piss Shivers provide the music for a punk rock group in the GMP Pictures/Red Letter Media feature film "Oranges the Movie"
- The Piss Shivers performed the theme song to the 2013 horror comedy movie Zombie eXs).
