= Alessandro Sommella =

Italian musician

Alessandro Sommella (born 1956) is an Italian musician. He studied electric bass, guitar, violin and double bass.

== Life ==
Sommella was born in born 1956 in Naples. He played in London with the band Souled Out producing the album Shine On, and later formed the band Planet Funk with whom he won a gold disc for the album Non Zero Sumness. Since 2005 he has worked as a music producer with the poet Marcella Boccia, and a number of Italian and international singers, such as Jovanotti.
