= The Great Shake =

Studio album by Planet Funk
- Released: 20 September 2011
- Label: Universal
- Producer: Planet Funk

Planet Funk chronology
Planet Funk (2009)	The Great Shake (2011)

The Great Shake is the fourth studio album by the Italian band Planet Funk, released on 20 September 2011.

== Track listing ==
1. "All Your Love"
2. "Another Sunrise"
3. "The Great Shake"
4. "How Should I Know"
5. "Just Another Try"
6. "Live It Up"
7. "Ora il mondo è perfetto" (featuring Giuliano Sangiorgi)
8. "The Other Side"
9. "You Remain"

== Charts ==
Chart performance for The Great Shake
Chart (2011)	Peak position
Italian Albums (FIMI)	31
