= The Illogical Consequence =

Studio album by Planet Funk
- Released: 2005
- Producer: Planet Funk

Planet Funk chronology
Non Zero Sumness (2000)	The Illogical Consequence (2005)	Static (2006)

The Illogical Consequence is the second album released by Planet Funk.

== Track listing ==
No.	Title	Lyrics	Music	Length
1.	"Movement Is Noted"	John Graham	John Graham, Simon Duffy	2:03
2.	"Everyday"	John Graham	Marco Baroni, John Graham, Alex Neri, Simon Duffy	4:20
3.	"Stop Me"	John Graham	John Graham, Marco Baroni, Alex Neri, Simon Duffy	3:53
4.	"Trapped Upon the Ground"	Dan Black	Marco Baroni, Dan Black, Simon Duffy	3:25
5.	"Come Alive"	John Graham	Marco Baroni, John Graham, Alex Neri, Simon Duffy	4:16
6.	"Laces"	John Graham	John Graham, Marco Baroni, Simon Duffy	3:24
7.	"The End"	John Graham	Alex Neri, Marco Baroni, John Graham, Simon Duffy	4:34
8.	"Ultraviolet Days"	John Graham	Marco Baroni, John Graham, Sergio Della Monica, Simon Duffy	4:53
9.	"Tears After the Rainbow"	Instrumental (spoken words by Robert Oppenheimer)	Marco Baroni, Alex Neri, John Graham, Simon Duffy	8:05
10.	"Inhuman Perfection"	Claudia Pandolfi	Alex Neri, Marco Baroni, Simon Duffy	4:49
11.	"Peak"	Dan Black	Alex Neri, Dan Black, Marco Baroni, Simon Duffy	3:47
12.	"Dusk"	Sally Doherty	Marco Baroni, Simon Duffy	5:07
13.	"Out on the Dancefloor"	Dan Black	Dan Black, Sergio Della Monica, Marco Baroni, Simon Duffy	6:35

Notes

- Vocals on tracks 1, 2, 3, 5, 6, 7, 8, 9 by John Graham.
- Vocals on tracks 4, 11, 13 by Dan Black.
- Vocals on track 10 by Claudia Pandolfi.
- Vocals on track 12 by Sally Doherty.
- Track 9 contains excerpts from an interview with Julius Robert Oppenheimer during the 1965 NBC television documentary The Decision to Drop the Bomb.

== Personnel ==
- Marco Baroni - Keyboards, synthesizers, piano, samples, programming, arrangements, production
- Alex Neri - Synthesizers, samples, disk jockey, programming, arrangements, production
- Sergio Della Monica - Bass, guitar, arrangements, production
- Domenico "GG" Canu - Guitar, production

=== Additional musicians ===
- John Graham - Vocals, guitar (track 2), piano (track 6), additional keyboards (tracks 3,8,9)
- Dan Black - Vocals
- Sally Doherty - Vocals
- Claudia Pandolfi - Vocals
- Simon Duffy - Keyboards, drum programming, engineering, mixing
- Leonardo Martera - Drums
- Andrea Cozzani - Bass (tracks 2,4,7,8)
- Cecilia Chailly - Harp
- John Miller - Drums (track 12)
- Maurizio Fiordaliso - Acoustic guitar (track 6)

== Charts ==
Chart performance for The Illogical Consequence
Chart (2005)	Peak position
Italian Albums (FIMI)	4
