= Mama Lover =

Studio album by Serebro
- Released: June 19, 2012 (Italy); June 26, 2012 (Worldwide); July 12, 2012 (Mexico)
- Recorded: 2007–2012
- Genres: Dance-pop, nu-disco, electropop
- Length: 59:04
- Languages: English (13 Tracks); Russian (2 Tracks)
- Labels: Columbia/Sony Music Entertainment; EGO Records
- Producers: Maxim Fadeev, Serebro

Serebro chronology
Izbrannoe (2009)	Mama Lover (2012)	Sila Tryokh (2016)

Singles from Mama Lover
- 1. "Mama Lover" Released: September 15, 2011; 2. "Gun" Released: September 28, 2012

Mama Lover is the second studio album by Russian recording trio Serebro. It was released in Italy on CD and digital on June 19, 2012 (one week earlier than scheduled worldwide release) by Sony Music Entertainment. Then in Mexico on July 12, 2012, by Universal Music. It was produced by their previous manager Maxim Fadeev and some songs were produced by Serebro themselves. The album was released worldwide on June 26, 2012.

It is noted that the studio album is mostly comprised by English language tracks, although the song "Мама Люба" is featured as a Russian track. The group's only featured single "Mama Lover" was released by Universal Music and Ego Records, which achieved moderate success in Europe.

== Background and composition ==
In 2010, Serebro announced they would be developing their second studio album. However, Fadeev announced that member Marina Lizorkina would be leaving the group, due to personal and financial reasons. Serebro were then intended to have a line-up change to replace Lizorkina. They announced that Anastasia Karpova would replace Lizorkina.

Then in the middle of 2009, it was announced the group would release their single "Сладко", indicating the group were in production of their second studio album. After the announcement of their first single following the line-up change, the group released singles "Не время" and "Давай держаться за руки". This is band member Anastasia Karpova's first studio album, while it's the other two members' second.

The album contains some songs from the group's previous album Опиумroz (2009) as well as the EP Избранное (2011). The songs have been re-recorded, as band member Anastasia was not featured on the previous album due to the line-up change. According to the group, they had described it saying "The songs are nice songs, very funny [and] very dance style".

== Release ==
Originally, Mama Lover was scheduled to be released on June 26, 2012, however the album was released on June 19, 2012, by Sony Music Entertainment in Italy. Although it was released early in Italy, the album was released worldwide on June 26, 2012, by Ego Records. The album was released in Southeast Asia in July 2012. It is the group's first album to be distributed by a major record label. The artwork of Mama Lover was released. According to band member Elena, she said the album is not to be released worldwide physically, stating: "Today, people, newspapers, programs, TV - everything is completely on the Internet. Releasing discs is already a thing of the past. If you want to hear our new songs, or create your own playlist or CD of the group SEREBRO, please - all our music is on the Internet,".

== Promotion ==
Throughout the start of the production of Mama Lover, the group have been touring throughout Europe to promote their music and album. During 2009, the group had performed at the New Wave Festival in Latvia. In February 2010, the group performed in Vancouver, Canada for the Olympic Games. The group then played at the Kremlin in Moscow, Russia on 23 June 2010. In September 2010, the group had performed their first solo concert at Czech Republic, where the group gave present gifts to children who reside in social rehabilitation centres. The group had performed their English premiere single "Sexing U" at the MTV Russia Beach Party in August 2010.

In July 2011, the group performed at Europa Plus Live, where they premiered their single "Mama Lover". In June 2012, the group performed at the Rome Gay Village concert, where they had presented custom made condoms by the group. On July 12, 2012, Serebro announced an auctioning of the album for a charity event for a nine-year-old girl named Lisa Kunigel, who has an undiscovered genetic disease. The album was ultimately auctioned for 34,500 Roubles ($1,083.65).

== Singles ==
=== Album singles ===
- "Mama Lover" was the group's first official single of the album. The song was released on September 15, 2011, in Europe and the United States by Ego Records and Universal Music. It was also the group's first single to be featured on iTunes in Europe. The song was written by band member Seryabkina. The music video for the song features the group driving a car through Russian streets. The song was commercially successful, peaking at number eight on the Russian Charts, number sixty-four in Czech Republic, number twenty-five in Spain and number twenty-three in Italy. On YouTube, it became Serebro's most viewed single.
- "Gun" was released worldwide as the second single on September 28, 2012, with additional radio edit. The Russian version named "Malkchik" (Russian: Мальчик) was premiered before and it was released only in Russia on June 13, 2012. The Russian version of the song appeared only on a Russian/CIS edition of the album.

=== Non-album singles ===
- "Sladko" (Russian: Сладко) was released on August 24, 2009, as a triple single with original Russian version, additional pop edit of the song and the English version named "Like Mary Warner". It was written by Maxim Fadeev with band member Olga Seryabkina and Irina Sekachova and produced by Fadeev. An accompanying music video was released on October 12, 2009. The song claimed the Russian Charts. The English version of the song was included in the album with different arrangement than the original, while the Russian version was excluded from the album track list.
- "Ne vremya" (Russian: Не время) was released as a single in support of the album on April 19, 2010, in Russia, while the English release was on September 19, 2010, named "Sexing U". The song was co-written by Seryabkina with Maxim Fadeev. A music video was released for the single on June 7, 2010, featuring the group dancing in a club. The song peaked at number six on the Russian Charts. The Russian version of the single was not featured on the album, but the English version appeared on the album track list.
- "Davay derzhat'sya za ruki" (Russian: Давай держаться за руки) was released as a single in support of the album on November 1, 2010, on the group's YouTube channel. This song was also co-written co-written by Seryabkina with Fadeev. A music video for the single was premiered on February 20, 2011, featuring the group nude in a white room dancing and walking. The song peaked at number third on the Russian Charts. The Russian version of the single was not featured on the album, while the English version was included in the album named "Angel Kiss" with additional dubstep remix.

== Track listing ==
All songs produced by Maxim Fadeev, mixed and recorded by Daniil Babichev.

Standard edition
No.	Title	Writer(s)	{{{extra_column}}}	Length
1.	"Paradise" (previously unreleased)	Maxim Fadeev; Olga Seryabkina	Maxim Fadeev	4:24
2.	"Like Mary Warner" (English Version of "Сладко")	Fadeev; Seryabkina	Maxim Fadeev	3:48
3.	"Song #1"	Fadeev; Daniil Babichev	Maxim Fadeev	3:22
4.	"Angel Kiss" (English Version of "Давай держаться за руки")	Fadeev; Seryabkina	Maxim Fadeev	4:17
5.	"Mama Lover"	Fadeev; Seryabkina	Maxim Fadeev	4:06
6.	"Why" (English version of "Опиум")	Fadeev; Babichev	Maxim Fadeev	3:43
7.	"Gun"	Fadeev; Seryabkina	Maxim Fadeev	4:11
8.	"Bastard" (previously unreleased)	Fadeev; Seryabkina	Maxim Fadeev	3:55
9.	"Never Be Good"	Fadeev; Babichev	Maxim Fadeev	3:14
10.	"Sexing U" (English version of "Не время")	Fadeev; Seryabkina	Maxim Fadeev	3:56
11.	"Whats Your Problem"	Babichev	Maxim Fadeev	3:21
12.	"Мама Люба (Mama Lyuba)" (Russian version of "Mama Lover")	Fadeev	Maxim Fadeev	4:06
13.	"Mama Lover" (karaoke/instrumental)	Fadeev	Maxim Fadeev	4:08
14.	"Sound Sleep" (Oma-Vega version)	Fadeev; Seryabkina; Babichev	Maxim Fadeev	5:11
15.	"Angel Kiss" (Dubstep remix)	Fadeev; Seryabkina	Maxim Fadeev	3:48

Russian/CIS edition (bonus track)
No.	Title	Writer(s)	{{{extra_column}}}	Length
13.	"Мальчик (Malchik)" (Russian version of "Gun")	Fadeev	Fadeev	4:11

Notes

- A karaoke version of "Mama Lover" was released on physical CD worldwide, but it doesn't appear to be available for digital download in Italy.
- "Like Mary Warner", "Song #1", "Why", "Never Be Good" and "Whats Your Problem" are updated with different and more electronic arrangement than the original, while some are also shorted. "Sound Sleep" was edited with some backup vocals by Maxim Fadeev band Oma-Vega [sic?].
