= Serbia in the Eurovision Song Contest 2018 =

- Eurovision Song Contest 2018
- Participating broadcaster: Radio Television of Serbia (RTS)
- Country: Serbia
- Selection process: Beovizija 2018
- Selection date: 20 February 2018

Competing entry
- Song: "Nova deca"
- Artist: Sanja Ilić and Balkanika
- Songwriters: Aleksandar Ilić; Tatjana Ilić; Danica Krstić

Placement
- Semi-final result: Qualified (9th, 117 points)
- Final result: 19th, 113 points

Participation chronology

Serbia was represented at the Eurovision Song Contest 2018 with the song "Nova deca", written by Sanja Ilić, Tanja Ilić, and Danica Krstić, and performed by Sanja Ilić and the group Balkanika. The Serbian participating broadcaster, Radio Television of Serbia (RTS), organised the national final Beovizija 2018 in order to select its entry for the contest.

Seventeen entries competed in the national final on 20 February 2018, which resulted in "Nova deca" performed by Sanja Ilić and Balkanika as the winner following the combination of votes from a five-member jury panel and a public televote.

Serbia was drawn to compete in the second semi-final of the Eurovision Song Contest which took place on 10 May 2018. Performing during the show in position 3, "Nova deca" was announced among the top 10 entries of the second semi-final and therefore qualified to compete in the final on 12 May. It was later revealed that Serbia placed ninth out of the 18 participating countries in the semi-final with 117 points. In the final, Serbia performed in position 10 and placed nineteenth out of the 26 participating countries, scoring 113 points.

== Background ==
Prior to the 2018 contest, Radio Television of Serbia (RTS) had participated in the Eurovision Song Contest representing Serbia ten times since its first entry in 2007, winning the contest with their debut entry "Molitva" performed by Marija Šerifović. Since 2007, seven out of ten of Serbia's entries have featured in the final with the nation failing to qualify in 2009, 2013 and 2017, the latter during which their entry "In Too Deep" performed by Tijana Bogićević failed to qualify to the final.

As part of its duties as participating broadcaster, RTS organises the selection of its entry in the Eurovision Song Contest and broadcasts the event in the country. The broadcaster confirmed its intentions to participate at the 2018 contest on 9 August 2017. Between 2007 and 2009, Serbia used the Beovizija national final in order to select their entry. However, after their 2009 entry, "Cipela" performed by Marko Kon and Milaan, failed to qualify Serbia to the final, the broadcaster shifted their selection strategy to selecting specific composers to create songs for artists. In 2010, RTS selected Goran Bregović to compose songs for a national final featuring three artists, while in 2011 Kornelije Kovač, Aleksandra Kovač and Kristina Kovač were tasked with composing one song each. In 2012, the internal selection of Željko Joksimović and the song "Nije ljubav stvar" secured the country's second highest placing in the contest to this point, placing third. In 2013, RTS returned to an open national final format and organized the Beosong competition. The winning entry, "Ljubav je svuda" performed by Moje 3, failed to qualify Serbia to the final at the Eurovision Song Contest 2013. In 2015, RTS selected Vladimir Graić, the composer of Serbia's Eurovision Song Contest 2007 winning entry "Molitva", to compose songs for a national final featuring three artists. RTS internally selected the Serbian entries in 2016 and 2017 with the decision made by RTS music editors.

== Before Eurovision ==
=== Beovizija 2018 ===
Beovizija 2018 was the eighth edition of the Beovizija national final organised by RTS in order to select the Serbian entry for the Eurovision Song Contest 2018. The selection was held on 20 February 2018, hosted by Dragana Kosjerina, Kristina Radenković, Branko Veselinović and Aca Stojanović. The show was broadcast on RTS1, RTS HD, RTS Svet and RTS Planeta as well as streamed online via the broadcaster's website rts.rs.

==== Competing entries ====
Artists and songwriters were able to submit their entries between 19 August 2017 and 10 November 2017. Artists were required to be citizens of Serbia and submit entries in one of the official languages of the Republic of Serbia, while songwriters of any nationality were allowed to submit songs. At the closing of the deadline, 75 submissions were received. A selection committee consisting of RTS music editors reviewed the submissions and selected seventeen entries to proceed to the national final. The selected competing entries were announced on 22 January 2018 and among the competing artists was Rambo Amadeus who represented Montenegro in the Eurovision Song Contest 2012.

| Artist | Song | Songwriter(s) |
|---|---|---|
| Biber and DJ Niko Bravo | "Svatovi" (Сватови) | Rastko Aksentijević, Nikola Burovac |
| Boris Režak | "Vila" (Вила) | Boris Režak, Nikola Raonić |
| Danijel Pavlović | "Ruža sudbine" (Ружа судбине) | Danijel Pavlović, Marina Tucaković |
| Dušan Svilar | "Pod krošnjom bagrema" (Под крошњом багрема) | Goran Kovačić |
| Igor Lazarević | "Beži od mene" (Бежи од мене) | Igor Lazarević |
| Ivan Kurtić | "Ni sunca ni meseca" (Ни сунца ни месеца) | Rastko Aksentijević |
| Koktel Balkan | "Zato" (Зато) | Bojan Jeremić |
| Lana i Aldo | "Jača od svih" (Јача од свих) | Lana Toković |
| Lord | "Samo nek se okreće" (Само нек се окреће) | Vladimir Preradović Lord |
| Maja Nikolić | "Zemlja čuda" (Земља чуда) | Vladimir Graić, Mia Pijade |
| Osmi Vazduh and Friends | "Probudi se" (Пробуди се) | Marko Kuzmanović, Lena Kuzmanović |
| Rambo Amadeus and Beti Đorđević | "Nema te" (Нема те) | Aca Pejčić, Antonije Pušić, Tanja Kragujević |
| Raybass | "Umoran" (Уморан) | Sofija Milutinović |
| Sanja Ilić and Balkanika | "Nova deca" (Нова деца) | Sanja Ilić, Tanja Karajnov, Danica Krstajić |
| Sashka Janx | "Pesma za tebe" (Песма за тебе) | Saška Janković, Marko Nikolić |
| SevdahBaby | "Hajde da igramo sada" (Хајде да играмо сада) | Milan Stanković, Predrag Radisavljević, Tijana Žunjić |
| Srđan and Emil | "Bar da znam" (Бар да знам) | Srđan Marijanović |

==== Final ====
The final took place at the Sava Centar in Belgrade on 20 February 2018 where seventeen songs competed. The winner, "Nova deca" performed by Sanja Ilić and Balkanika, was decided by a combination of votes from a jury panel consisting of Vojislav Borisavljević (composer), Ivana Peters (singer-songwriter), Dušan Alagić (composer), Dejan Petrović (trumpeter) and Željko Vasić (singer), and the Serbian public via SMS voting. Former Eurovision contestants Jelena Tomašević, who represented Serbia in 2008, Regina, which represented Bosnia and Herzegovina in 2009, Marko Kon, who represented Serbia in 2009, Milan Stanković, who represented Serbia in 2010, Moje 3, which represented Serbia in 2013, Sergej Ćetković, who represented Montenegro in 2014, Knez, who represented Montenegro in 2015, Bojana Stamenov, who represented Serbia in 2015, Sanja Vučić, who represented Serbia in 2016, Jacques Houdek, who represented Croatia in 2017, and Tijana Bogićević, who represented Serbia in 2017, were featured as guest performers during the show.

Final – 20 February 2018
| R/O | Artist | Song | Jury | | Televote | | Total | Place |
| R/O | Artist | Song | Votes | Points | Votes | Points | Total | Place |
|---|---|---|---|---|---|---|---|---|
| 1 | SevdahBaby | "Hajde da igramo sada" | 7 | 0 | 262 | 0 | 0 | 12 |
| 2 | Rambo Amadeus and Beti Đorđević | "Nema te" | 12 | 3 | 1,342 | 1 | 4 | 9 |
| 3 | Maja Nikolić | "Zemlja čuda" | 0 | 0 | 2,110 | 3 | 3 | 10 |
| 4 | Srđan and Emil | "Bar da znam" | 2 | 0 | 327 | 0 | 0 | 12 |
| 5 | Ivan Kurtić | "Ni sunca ni meseca" | 38 | 8 | 1,791 | 2 | 10 | 6 |
| 6 | Sanja Ilić and Balkanika | "Nova deca" | 53 | 12 | 14,698 | 12 | 24 | 1 |
| 7 | Koktel Balkan | "Zato" | 8 | 1 | 487 | 0 | 1 | 11 |
| 8 | Boris Režak | "Vila" | 23 | 4 | 2,489 | 5 | 9 | 7 |
| 9 | Lana i Aldo | "Jača od svih" | 0 | 0 | 631 | 0 | 0 | 12 |
| 10 | Dušan Svilar | "Pod krošnjom bagrema" | 28 | 7 | 5,403 | 8 | 15 | 3 |
| 11 | Igor Lazarević | "Beži od mene" | 0 | 0 | 1,308 | 0 | 0 | 12 |
| 12 | Sashka Janx | "Pesma za tebe" | 52 | 10 | 5,959 | 10 | 20 | 2 |
| 13 | Lord | "Samo nek se okreće" | 27 | 6 | 2,884 | 6 | 12 | 5 |
| 14 | Danijel Pavlović | "Ruža sudbine" | 11 | 2 | 2,188 | 4 | 6 | 8 |
| 15 | Raybass | "Umoran" | 0 | 0 | 1,297 | 0 | 0 | 12 |
| 16 | Osmi Vazduh and Friends | "Probudi se" | 4 | 0 | 1,334 | 0 | 0 | 12 |
| 17 | Biber and DJ Niko Bravo | "Svatovi" | 25 | 5 | 4,981 | 7 | 12 | 4 |

Detailed Jury Votes
| R/O | Song | V. Borisavljević | I. Peters | D. Alagić | D. Petrović | Ž. Vasić | Total |
|---|---|---|---|---|---|---|---|
| 1 | "Hajde da igramo sada" | 3 | | 3 | 1 | | 7 |
| 2 | "Nema te" | | 1 | | 7 | 4 | 12 |
| 3 | "Zemlja čuda" | | | | | | 0 |
| 4 | "Bar da znam" | 2 | | | | | 2 |
| 5 | "Ni sunca ni meseca" | 4 | 12 | 6 | 8 | 8 | 38 |
| 6 | "Nova deca" | 12 | 7 | 12 | 10 | 12 | 53 |
| 7 | "Zato" | 1 | 3 | | 2 | 2 | 8 |
| 8 | "Vila" | | 6 | 5 | 6 | 6 | 23 |
| 9 | "Jača od svih" | | | | | | 0 |
| 10 | "Pod krošnjom bagrema" | 8 | 5 | 7 | 5 | 3 | 28 |
| 11 | "Beži od mene" | | | | | | 0 |
| 12 | "Pesma za tebe" | 10 | 10 | 10 | 12 | 10 | 52 |
| 13 | "Samo nek se okreće" | 6 | 8 | 4 | 4 | 5 | 27 |
| 14 | "Ruža sudbine" | 5 | 4 | 2 | | | 11 |
| 15 | "Umoran" | | | | | | 0 |
| 16 | "Probudi se" | | 2 | 1 | | 1 | 4 |
| 17 | "Svatovi" | 7 | | 8 | 3 | 7 | 25 |

== At Eurovision ==
According to Eurovision rules, all nations with the exceptions of the host country and the "Big Five" (France, Germany, Italy, Spain and the United Kingdom) are required to qualify from one of two semi-finals in order to compete for the final; the top ten countries from each semi-final progress to the final. The European Broadcasting Union (EBU) split up the competing countries into six different pots based on voting patterns from previous contests, with countries with favourable voting histories put into the same pot. On 29 January 2018, a special allocation draw was held which placed each country into one of the two semi-finals, as well as which half of the show they would perform in. Serbia was placed into the second semi-final, to be held on 10 May 2018, and was scheduled to perform in the first half of the show.

Once all the competing songs for the 2018 contest had been released, the running order for the semi-finals was decided by the shows' producers rather than through another draw, so that similar songs were not placed next to each other. Serbia was set to perform in position 3, following the entry from Romania and before the entry from San Marino.

The two semi-finals and the final were broadcast in Serbia on RTS1, RTS HD, RTS Svet and RTS Planeta with commentary for the first semi-final by Silvana Grujić and Tamara Petković and commentary for the second semi-final and final by Duška Vučinić. The Serbian spokesperson, who announced the top 12-point score awarded by the Serbian jury during the final, was Dragana Kosjerina.

=== Semi-final ===
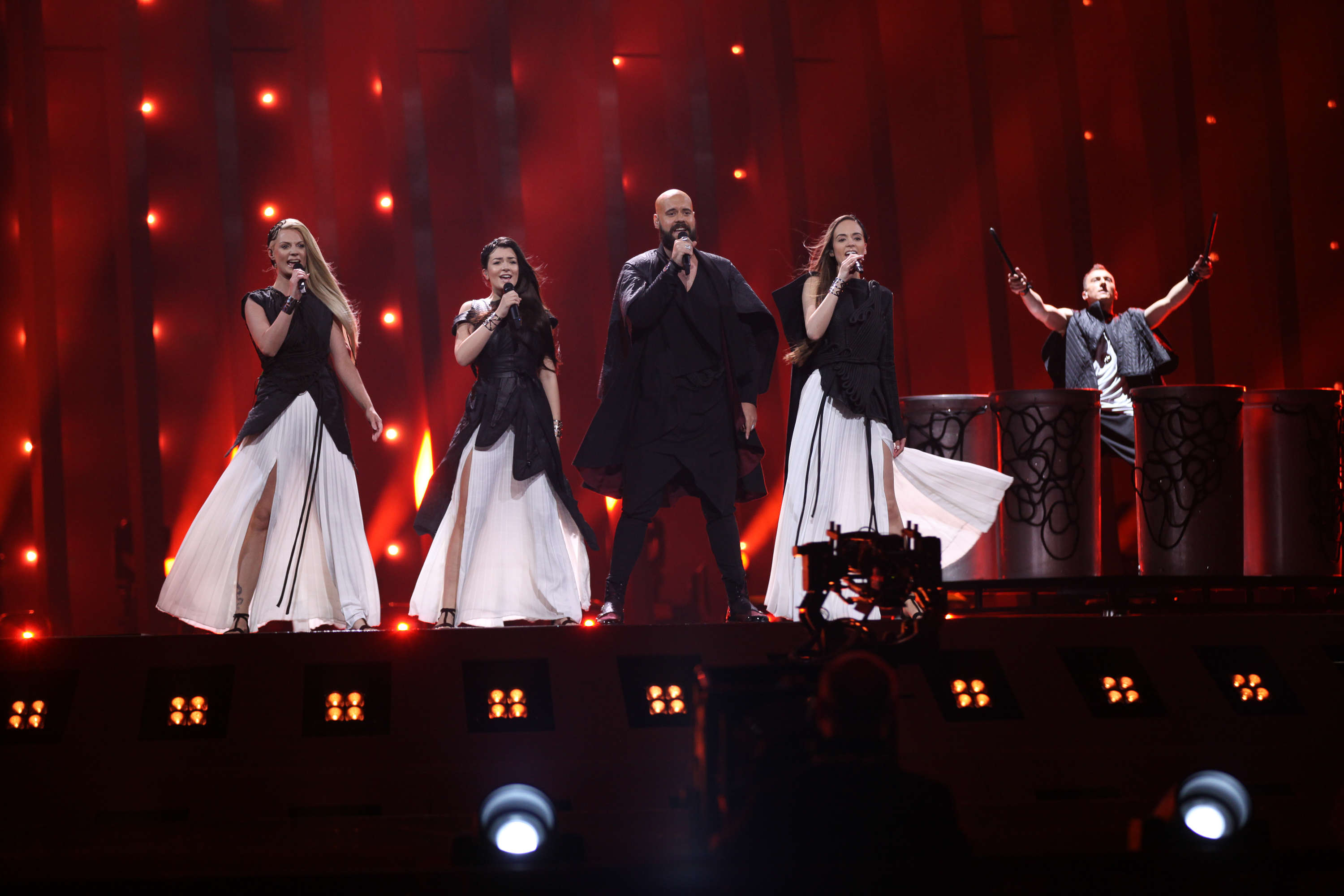
Sanja Ilić and Balkanika during a rehearsal before the second semi-final

Sanja Ilić and Balkanika took part in technical rehearsals on 1 and 4 May, followed by dress rehearsals on 9 and 10 May. This included the jury show on 9 May where the professional juries of each country watched and voted on the competing entries.

The Serbian performance featured the members of Balkanika performing choreographed movements on stage with the stage lighting predominately displaying blue, black and gold colours. The director of the Serbian performance was Gorčin Stojanović and the choreography was completed by Milan Gromilić. An additional vocalist, Iva Banićević, was also part of the performance. The black stage costumes for the performance were designed by designer Nevena Ivanović. In regards to the recurring ropes on the costumes, Sanja Ilić and Balkanika stated: "The ropes on our clothes symbolize the connections between the old and new generation, between old and new tradition".

At the end of the show, Serbia was announced as having finished in the top 10 and subsequently qualifying for the grand final. It was later revealed that Serbia placed ninth in the semi-final, receiving a total of 117 points: 72 points from the televoting and 45 points from the juries.

=== Final ===
Shortly after the second semi-final, a winners' press conference was held for the ten qualifying countries. As part of this press conference, the qualifying artists took part in a draw to determine which half of the grand final they would subsequently participate in. This draw was done in the order the countries were announced during the semi-final. Serbia was drawn to compete in the first half. Following this draw, the shows' producers decided upon the running order of the final, as they had done for the semi-finals. Serbia was subsequently placed to perform in position 10, following the entry from the United Kingdom and before the entry from Germany.

Sanja Ilić and Balkanika once again took part in dress rehearsals on 11 and 12 May before the final, including the jury final where the professional juries cast their final votes before the live show. The members of Balkanika performed a repeat of their semi-final performance during the final on 12 May. Serbia placed nineteenth in the final, scoring 113 points: 75 points from the televoting and 38 points from the juries.

=== Voting ===
Voting during the three shows involved each country awarding two sets of points from 1-8, 10 and 12: one from their professional jury and the other from televoting. Each nation's jury consisted of five music industry professionals who are citizens of the country they represent, with their names published before the contest to ensure transparency. This jury judged each entry based on: vocal capacity; the stage performance; the song's composition and originality; and the overall impression by the act. In addition, no member of a national jury was permitted to be related in any way to any of the competing acts in such a way that they cannot vote impartially and independently. The individual rankings of each jury member as well as the nation's televoting results were released shortly after the grand final.

Below is a breakdown of points awarded to Serbia and awarded by Serbia in the second semi-final and grand final of the contest, and the breakdown of the jury voting and televoting conducted during the two shows:

==== Points awarded to Serbia ====
Points awarded to Serbia (Semi-final 2)
| Score | Televote | Jury |
|---|---|---|
| 12 points | Montenegro; Slovenia | Montenegro |
| 10 points | France; Moldova | |
| 8 points | | |
| 7 points | | Russia |
| 6 points | Germany; Russia | Hungary; Romania; San Marino |
| 5 points | | |
| 4 points | Italy; Romania; Sweden | Slovenia |
| 3 points | | |
| 2 points | Hungary | |
| 1 point | Netherlands; Norway | Denmark; Germany; Italy; Malta |

Points awarded to Serbia (Final)
| Score | Televote | Jury |
|---|---|---|
| 12 points | Croatia; Montenegro; Slovenia; Switzerland | Montenegro |
| 10 points | Macedonia | Azerbaijan |
| 8 points | Austria | Macedonia |
| 7 points | Bulgaria | |
| 6 points | | |
| 5 points | | |
| 4 points | | |
| 3 points | | Albania; San Marino |
| 2 points | | Greece |
| 1 point | France; Italy | |

==== Points awarded by Serbia ====
Points awarded by Serbia (Semi-final 2)
| Score | Televote | Jury |
|---|---|---|
| 12 points | Hungary | Sweden |
| 10 points | Montenegro | Netherlands |
| 8 points | Slovenia | Norway |
| 7 points | Russia | Montenegro |
| 6 points | Norway | Australia |
| 5 points | Moldova | Denmark |
| 4 points | Denmark | Malta |
| 3 points | Australia | Latvia |
| 2 points | Ukraine | Slovenia |
| 1 point | Sweden | Romania |

Points awarded by Serbia (Final)
| Score | Televote | Jury |
|---|---|---|
| 12 points | Hungary | Sweden |
| 10 points | Cyprus | Germany |
| 8 points | Slovenia | Italy |
| 7 points | Israel | Netherlands |
| 6 points | Italy | Norway |
| 5 points | Czech Republic | Moldova |
| 4 points | Denmark | Austria |
| 3 points | Norway | Estonia |
| 2 points | Bulgaria | Israel |
| 1 point | Moldova | Albania |

==== Detailed voting results ====
The following members comprised the Serbian jury:

- Radivoje Radivojević (jury chairperson) – composer
- Bojana Stamenov – singer, represented Serbia in 2015
- Dejan Cukić – singer, composer
- Tijana Milošević – concertmaster
- Bane Krstić – singer, composer

Detailed voting results from Serbia (Semi-final 2)
| R/O | Country | Jury | | | | | | | Televote | |
| R/O | Country | B. Stamenov | D. Cukić | T. Milošević | R. Radivojević | B. Krstić | Rank | Points | Rank | Points |
|---|---|---|---|---|---|---|---|---|---|---|
| 01 | Norway | 1 | 4 | 10 | 4 | 5 | 3 | 8 | 5 | 6 |
| 02 | Romania | 8 | 5 | 9 | 7 | 14 | 10 | 1 | 15 | |
| 03 | Serbia | | | | | | | | | |
| 04 | San Marino | 16 | 17 | 17 | 17 | 15 | 17 | | 17 | |
| 05 | Denmark | 13 | 6 | 8 | 9 | 2 | 6 | 5 | 7 | 4 |
| 06 | Russia | 17 | 14 | 11 | 16 | 10 | 14 | | 4 | 7 |
| 07 | Moldova | 12 | 16 | 16 | 14 | 6 | 13 | | 6 | 5 |
| 08 | Netherlands | 10 | 3 | 2 | 2 | 7 | 2 | 10 | 12 | |
| 09 | Australia | 6 | 13 | 6 | 3 | 3 | 5 | 6 | 8 | 3 |
| 10 | Georgia | 15 | 12 | 7 | 8 | 8 | 11 | | 14 | |
| 11 | Poland | 11 | 10 | 15 | 15 | 17 | 15 | | 16 | |
| 12 | Malta | 5 | 7 | 3 | 13 | 9 | 7 | 4 | 13 | |
| 13 | Hungary | 7 | 8 | 12 | 12 | 16 | 12 | | 1 | 12 |
| 14 | Latvia | 9 | 11 | 5 | 10 | 4 | 8 | 3 | 11 | |
| 15 | Sweden | 2 | 2 | 1 | 1 | 1 | 1 | 12 | 10 | 1 |
| 16 | Montenegro | 3 | 1 | 4 | 6 | 12 | 4 | 7 | 2 | 10 |
| 17 | Slovenia | 4 | 9 | 14 | 5 | 11 | 9 | 2 | 3 | 8 |
| 18 | Ukraine | 14 | 15 | 13 | 11 | 13 | 16 | | 9 | 2 |

Detailed voting results from Serbia (Final)
| R/O | Country | Jury | | | | | | | Televote | |
| R/O | Country | B. Stamenov | D. Cukić | T. Milošević | R. Radivojević | B. Krstić | Rank | Points | Rank | Points |
|---|---|---|---|---|---|---|---|---|---|---|
| 01 | Ukraine | 22 | 24 | 19 | 20 | 17 | 22 | | 18 | |
| 02 | Spain | 17 | 21 | 20 | 15 | 18 | 20 | | 20 | |
| 03 | Slovenia | 11 | 8 | 12 | 12 | 15 | 13 | | 3 | 8 |
| 04 | Lithuania | 25 | 20 | 25 | 21 | 16 | 23 | | 24 | |
| 05 | Austria | 9 | 6 | 4 | 10 | 3 | 7 | 4 | 14 | |
| 06 | Estonia | 4 | 13 | 3 | 11 | 12 | 8 | 3 | 11 | |
| 07 | Norway | 2 | 5 | 13 | 7 | 6 | 5 | 6 | 8 | 3 |
| 08 | Portugal | 24 | 23 | 23 | 19 | 19 | 24 | | 25 | |
| 09 | United Kingdom | 23 | 16 | 24 | 18 | 9 | 17 | | 22 | |
| 10 | Serbia | | | | | | | | | |
| 11 | Germany | 6 | 1 | 8 | 3 | 2 | 2 | 10 | 12 | |
| 12 | Albania | 12 | 12 | 5 | 13 | 10 | 10 | 1 | 13 | |
| 13 | France | 20 | 18 | 22 | 25 | 24 | 25 | | 17 | |
| 14 | Czech Republic | 21 | 19 | 16 | 16 | 23 | 21 | | 6 | 5 |
| 15 | Denmark | 18 | 9 | 15 | 14 | 14 | 15 | | 7 | 4 |
| 16 | Australia | 14 | 15 | 9 | 9 | 8 | 12 | | 16 | |
| 17 | Finland | 7 | 22 | 17 | 17 | 13 | 14 | | 23 | |
| 18 | Bulgaria | 15 | 14 | 10 | 22 | 25 | 16 | | 9 | 2 |
| 19 | Moldova | 5 | 10 | 7 | 4 | 4 | 6 | 5 | 10 | 1 |
| 20 | Sweden | 3 | 2 | 2 | 1 | 1 | 1 | 12 | 19 | |
| 21 | Hungary | 16 | 11 | 14 | 24 | 20 | 18 | | 1 | 12 |
| 22 | Israel | 1 | 17 | 11 | 8 | 21 | 9 | 2 | 4 | 7 |
| 23 | Netherlands | 13 | 4 | 1 | 5 | 7 | 4 | 7 | 15 | |
| 24 | Ireland | 19 | 7 | 21 | 6 | 11 | 11 | | 21 | |
| 25 | Cyprus | 10 | 25 | 18 | 23 | 22 | 19 | | 2 | 10 |
| 26 | Italy | 8 | 3 | 6 | 2 | 5 | 3 | 8 | 5 | 6 |
