= Bora Dugić =

Bora Dugić Бора Дугић
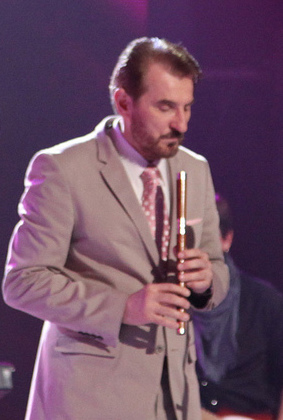
- Dugić in 2012

Background information
- Also known as: Bora
- Born: Borislav Dugić; 10 June 1949 (age 77); Đurđevo, PR Serbia, FPR Yugoslavia
- Origin: Đurđevo, Serbia
- Genre: Traditional music
- Occupation: Composer
- Instrument: Flute
- Years active: 1972 - present
- Label: PGP-RTS
- Website: www.boradugic.com

Borislav "Bora" Dugić (Serbian Cyrillic: Борислав Бора Дугић, pronounced [bǒːrislaʋ bǒːra dǔːɡitɕ]; born 10 June 1949) is a Serbian musician and flautist having released a number of CDs and records as well as having performed at countless concerts.

== Early and professional life ==
Bora Dugić finished high school and college in the field of mathematics. Since a young age he played the flute and upon the completion of his high school education he moved to the city of Kragujevac in Central Serbia. There, he became the secretary of the cultural group “Abrašević”. As he continued to become more popular due to his abilities playing the flute, Bora moved to Serbia's capital Belgrade where he joined the grand Folk Orchestra of RTV Belgrade. He is the winner of the October Award, Gold Thimble Award for constant contribution to the culture of Belgrade, and numerous other domestic and international awards.

In 2004 he celebrated 35 years of artistic work, by a grand solo concert name The Play of Spirit at the Sava Centar in Belgrade. In 2008 he appeared at the Eurovision Song Contest 2008 alongside Jelena Tomašević.

== Personal life ==
Dugić is married to Milanka, who is also involved in music. They have a daughter Jasmina, who is a costume designer and a son Bojan, who graduated from the Berklee College of Music in Boston.

Awards and achievements
Preceded by Marija Šerifović with Molitva	Serbia in the Eurovision Song Contest (featuring for Jelena Tomašević); 2008	Succeeded by Marko Kon and Milaan with Cipela
