= Serbia in the Eurovision Song Contest =

- Eurovision Song Contest
- Participating broadcaster: Radio-televizija Srbije (RTS)

Participation summary
- Appearances: 18 (14 finals)
- First appearance: 2007
- Highest placement: 1st: 2007
- Host: 2008
- Participation history: 2007; 2008; 2009; 2010; 2011; 2012; 2013; 2014; 2015; 2016; 2017; 2018; 2019; ~~2020~~; 2021; 2022; 2023; 2024; 2025; 2026

Related articles
- Beovizija; Pesma za Evroviziju
- Serbia's page at Eurovision.com
- For the most recent participation see Serbia in the Eurovision Song Contest 2026

Serbia has been represented at the Eurovision Song Contest 18 times since making its debut in 2007. The Serbian participating broadcaster in the contest is Radio-televizija Srbije (RTS). Serbia won the contest on its debut with "Molitva" by Marija Šerifović. The country's other top five results are third place in 2012 with "Nije ljubav stvar" by Željko Joksimović, and fifth place in 2022 with "In corpore sano" by Konstrakta. Serbia's other top ten results are sixth place (2008) and tenth place (2015).

Before its independence, the Socialist Republic of Serbia participated in the contest as part of Yugoslavia (both the Socialist Federal Republic of Yugoslavia from 1961 to 1991 and the Federal Republic of Yugoslavia in 1992), and the Republic of Serbia participated as part of Serbia and Montenegro (from 2004 to 2006).

== Participation ==
Radio-televizija Srbije (RTS) has been a full member of the European Broadcasting Union (EBU) since 2006, thus eligible to participate in the Eurovision Song Contest since then. It has participated in the contest representing Serbia since the 52nd edition in 2007.

Before the country became independent on 5 June 2006, entries from Serbia had participated in the contest as part of Yugoslavia and later Serbia and Montenegro. Four Yugoslav entrants in the contest came from the former SR Serbia: 1974, 1982, 1991, and 1992), and one of Serbia and Montenegro's entrants came from the former Republic of Serbia (2004).

== History ==
=== 2000s ===
Serbia made its debut in the contest as an independent nation with the ballad "Molitva" by Marija Šerifović. "Molitva" won the 2007 contest, receiving 268 points, making Serbia the first country to win with a debut entry after Switzerland's win at the first edition. Subsequently, Serbia was host of the 2008 contest in its capital Belgrade.

The second Serbian entry, performed in Belgrade was written by past entrant for Serbia as part of Serbia and Montenegro and contest host Željko Joksimović. The song "Oro", an ethnic ballad, performed by Jelena Tomašević came 6th and received 160 points in the overall rankings.

In 2009, Serbia selected Marko Kon and Milaan to represent them in the second semi-final on 14 May. The duo failed to qualify for the final, marking it the first time Serbia failed to qualify for the final since the introduction of semi-finals.

=== 2010s ===
In 2010, Milan Stanković was selected to represent the country in the contest with "Ovo je Balkan", an upbeat song with ethno elements, and is about a love story set in Belgrade. It qualified for the final and in the end achieved 13th place with 72 points. In 2011, Nina was selected with her 1960s inspired song, "Čaroban". She was accompanied with three other singers who would be dancing throughout the performance. In the semi-finals She performed 6th and qualified for the final. In the final, she performed 24th and achieved 14th place. After finishing second in 2004 when representing Serbia and Montenegro, Željko Joksimović returned to compete in 2012 with the song "Nije ljubav stvar". On the second semi-final he took second place, while he finished third in the final, below second-placed Russia and the winner, Sweden. Moje 3 represented Serbia in the 2013 contest in Malmö with the song "Ljubav je svuda". They would finish 11th in the first semi-final, therefore not qualifying for the final. This was the second time that Serbia did not qualify for the final. On 22 November 2013, RTS announced that it would not participate in the 2014 contest due to financial difficulties and a lack of available sponsorship for a potential Serbian entry. They did, however, broadcast all three shows.

On 26 September 2014, it was reported that Serbia had decided to return to the 2015 contest to be held in Austrian capital, Vienna. On 15 February 2015 Serbia chose their own representative in the TV show "Odbrojavanje za Beč". Odbrojavanje za Beč (English: Countdown for Vienna) was the national final organised by RTS in order to select the Serbian entry for the 2015 contest. The selection featured three songs composed by Vladimir Graić, the composer of Serbia's winning entry "Molitva" in 2007. Two of the songs were performed by established Serbian artists Bojana Stamenov and Aleksa Jelić, while one was performed by Danica Krstić, a new talent chosen by Graić through a scouting process. Bojana Stamenov was selected as the Serbian representative for Vienna through a 50:50 voting system, where both the audience and the jury voted for her song "Ceo svet je moj" (The whole world is mine) to represent Serbia in Austria. It was later announced that she would perform her song in English (a first for a Serbian entry) titled "Beauty Never Lies". Despite being low with the odds and fan votings, Bojana surprised everyone in the first semifinal and became one of the big press and fan favourites. She qualified to the final with 9th place in Semi-Final 1, but managed to achieve another top 10 result for Serbia in the Grand Final, scoring 53 points and the 10th place.

In March 2016, RTS internally decided for Sanja Vučić to represent Serbia in Stockholm, Sweden with the song "Goodbye (Shelter)". In the 2016 contest, she performed in the second semi-final, qualifying through. In the grand final, Vučić placed 18th by scoring 115 points. The following contest, Serbia was represented by Tijana Bogićević in Kyiv, Ukraine, again chosen by the national broadcaster. She failed to qualify from the second semi-final by finishing 11th.

In February 2018, Sanja Ilić and the world music group Balkanika were declared the winners of the returning Beovizija contest. They performed in the second semi-final of the 2018 contest, hosted in Lisbon, Portugal. In the final, Sanja Ilić and Balkanika finished in 19th place with 113 points. Subsequently, the Beovizija 2019 was won by Nevena Božović and "Kruna", who therefore represented Serbia in Tel Aviv, Israel. Božović, who qualified from the first semi-final, scored 89 points in the final and thus placed 18th.

=== 2020s ===
On March 1, 2020, girl group Hurricane won Beovizija 2020 with "Hasta la vista" and were supposed to compete in Rotterdam, Netherlands. The 2020 contest was, however, eventually cancelled due to the COVID-19 pandemic. In December 2020, RTS selected Hurricane internally to represent Serbia in the 2021 contest. Hurricane performed their new entry, "Loco loco", in the second semi-final, going through. In the final they went on to place 15th with 102 points.

The following year, Beovizija was replaced by the newly-established national selection contest, Pesma za Evroviziju. The contest's first edition, held in March 2022, was won by Konstrakta and "In corpore sano", who was therefore chosen to represent Serbia in the 2022 contest, hosted in Turin, Italy. Konstrakta qualified from the semi-final 2. In the final she placed 5th with 312 points. "In corpore sano" became the most successful Serbian entry since 2012. Furthermore, Konstrakta also won the Artistic Marcel Bezençon Award and two Eurovision Awards - the Most Innovative Staging and the Best Lyrics.

At the beginning of March 2023, RTS organized Pesma za Evroviziju '23, where Luke Black with "Samo mi se spava" was declared the winner and Serbian representative in Liverpool, United Kingdom. In Liverpool, Luke finished in 24th place in the finals with 30 points.

Pesma za Evroviziju '24 was held to select the Serbian representative in 2024, and was won by Teya Dora with the song "Ramonda". In Malmö, Teya finished in 17th place in the finals with 54 points.

Pesma za Evroviziju '25 was held to select Serbia's entry for the 2025 contest, with Princ winning with the song "Mila". The entry failed to qualify from the semi-finals, ending a six-year streak of reaching the final. It was later revealed that it finished in 14th place with 28 points in the semi-final, which marked their worst result to date.

Pesma za Evroviziju '26 was held to select the entry for 2026. Lavina won the selection with the song "Kraj mene". The song qualified from the semi-final. Lavina finished in 17th place in the finals with 90 points.

== Participation overview ==
Prior to Yugoslavia and Serbia and Montenegro's dissolution, artists from the Serbian federal unit represented Yugoslavia in 1974, 1982, 1991 and as a republic unit in 1992 and 2004.

Table key
1	First place
2	Second place
3	Third place
◇	Entry selected but did not compete
†	Upcoming event

Year	Artist	Song	Language	Final	Points	Semi	Points
2007	Marija Šerifović	"Molitva" (Молитва)	Serbian	1	268	1	298
2008	Jelena Tomašević feat. Bora Dugić	"Oro" (Оро)	Serbian	6	160	Host country	
2009	Marko Kon and Milaan	"Cipela" (Ципела)	Serbian	Failed to qualify		10 (Note: Whilist the 10th place would have been enough to qualify in previous and upcoming years, in 2008 and 2009 the top nine countries in each semi-final as determined by televoting qualified automatically, with the tenth place determined based on the votes of the back-up juries among the remaining countries. This resulted in Croatia advancing to the final instead of Serbia in 2009.)	60
2010	Milan Stanković	"Ovo je Balkan" (Ово је Балкан)	Serbian	13	72	5	79
2011	Nina	"Čaroban" (Чаробан)	Serbian	14	85	8	67
2012	Željko Joksimović	"Nije ljubav stvar" (Није љубав ствар)	Serbian	3	214	2	159
2013	Moje 3	"Ljubav je svuda" (Љубав је свуда)	Serbian	Failed to qualify		11	46
2015	Bojana Stamenov	"Beauty Never Lies"	English	10	53	9	63
2016	Sanja Vučić Zaa	"Goodbye (Shelter)"	English	18	115	10	105
2017	Tijana Bogićević	"In Too Deep"	English	Failed to qualify		11	98
2018	Sanja Ilić and Balkanika	"Nova deca" (Нова деца)	Serbian	19	113	9	117
2019	Nevena Božović	"Kruna" (Круна)	Serbian	18	89	7	156
2020	Hurricane ◇	"Hasta la vista" ◇	Serbian ◇	Contest cancelled (Note: The 2020 contest was cancelled due to the COVID-19 pandemic.)			
2021	Hurricane	"Loco loco"	Serbian	15	102	8	124
2022	Konstrakta	"In corpore sano"	Serbian, Latin	5	312	3	237
2023	Luke Black	"Samo mi se spava" (Само ми се спава)	Serbian, English	24	30	10	37
2024	Teya Dora	"Ramonda" (Рамонда)	Serbian	17	54	10	47
2025	Princ	"Mila" (Мила)	Serbian	Failed to qualify		14	28
2026	Lavina	"Kraj mene" (Крај мене)	Serbian	17	90	5	187
2027	Confirmed intention to participate †						

== Hostings ==
Year	Location	Venue	Presenters	Image
2008	Belgrade	Belgrade Arena	Jovana Janković and Željko Joksimović	

== Awards ==
=== Marcel Bezençon Awards ===
Year	Category	Song	Performer	Final	Points	Host city	Ref.
2007	Artistic Award	"Molitva" (Молитва)	Marija Šerifović	1	268	(Finland) Helsinki	
2022	Artistic Award	"In corpore sano"	Konstrakta	5	312	(Italy) Turin	

=== Winner by OGAE members ===
Year	Song	Performer	Final	Points	Host city	Ref.
2007	"Molitva" (Молитва)	Marija Šerifović	1	268	(Finland) Helsinki	

=== Barbara Dex Award ===
Year	Performer	Host city	Ref.
2010	Milan Stanković	(Norway) Oslo	
2013	Moje 3	(Sweden) Malmö	

== Related involvement ==
=== Heads of delegations ===
Each participating broadcaster in the Eurovision Song Contest assigns a head of delegation as the EBU's contact person and the leader of their delegation at the event. The delegation, whose size can greatly vary, includes a head of press, the performers, songwriters, composers, and backing vocalists, among others.

Year	Head of delegation	Ref.
2007–2009	Anja Rogljić	
2010–2016	Dragan Ilić	
2017–2022	Anja Rogljić	
2023–present	Uroš Marković	

=== Jury members ===
Each participating broadcaster assembles a five-member jury panel consisting of music industry professionals for the Eurovision Song Contest, ranking all entries except for their own. The modern incarnation of jury voting was introduced beginning with the 2009 contest, and as of 2023, the juries' votes constitute just under 50% of the overall result in the final alongside televoting.

Jury members
Year	Juror 1	Juror 2	Juror 3	Juror 4	Juror 5	Ref.
2015	Dejan Cukić	Marko Kon	Saša Milošević	Ksenija Milošević	Nevena Božović	
2016	Slobodan Marković	Nikola Čuturilo	Vladimir Graić	Mari Mari	Ana Milenković	
2017	Ivana Peters	Tanja Banjanin	Vojkan Borisavljević	Aleksandar Milić	Ana Štajdohar	
2018	Bojana Stamenov	Dejan Cukić	Tijana Milošević	Radivoje Radivojević	Bane Krstić	
2019	Sanja Ilić	Aleksandra Milutinović	Leontina Vukomanović	Silvana Grujić	Vojislav Aralica	
2021	Snežana Berić (Extra Nena)	Ivana Peters	Milan Stanković	Slobodan Marković	Tijana Bogićević	
2022	Dušan Alagić	Jelena Tomašević	Marija Marić Marković	Miloš Luka Roganović	Srđan Marjanović	
2023	Dragan Đorđević	Zoran Živanović	Ana Đurić	Sandra Perović	Sara Jovanović	
2024	Alek Aleksov	Milovan Bošković	Luka Ivanović (Luke Black)	Lena Kovačević	Zejna Murkić	
2025	Aleksandar Habić	Luka Jovanović (Luxonee)	Bojana Stamenov	Ivana Peters	Olga Biserčić	

== Broadcasts ==
=== Viewership ===
Year	Show									Ref(s)
Year	First semi-final			Second semi-final			Final			Ref(s)
Year	Viewers	AVG viewers	Share	Viewers	AVG viewers	Share	Viewers	AVG viewers	Share	Ref(s)
2008							3,350,000			
2012									52.2%	
2016							660,000			
2018							2,262,000		30.3%	
2021			15.2%			29.9%	2,500,000		43.1%	
2022	1,200,000			1,800,000				1,150,000	47%	
2023	500,000	227,186	8,43%		149,391	5,4%	2,000,000	673,706	29,45%	
2024							1,860,832	837,678	37%	
2025								303,000	15%	

=== Commentators and spokespersons ===
For the show's broadcast on RTS, various commentators have provided commentary on the contest in the Serbian language. At the Eurovision Song Contest after all points are calculated, the presenters of the show call upon each voting country to invite each respective spokesperson to announce the results of their vote on-screen.

From 1961 until 1992, Serbia competed as part of Yugoslavia, and from 2004 to 2005 as part of Serbia and Montenegro. The Serbian affiliates of the Yugoslav Radio Television (JRT) first and Udruženje javnih radija i televizija (UJRT) later broadcast the contest there with Serbian commentary.

Year	Commentator	Shows	Channel	Spokesperson	Ref.
2007	Duška Vučinić	All shows	RTS1, RTS Sat	Maja Nikolić	
2008	Dragan Ilić and Mladen Popović	All shows	RTS1, RTS Sat	Dušica Spasić	
2009	Dragan Ilić	SF1	RTS1, RTS Digital, RTS Sat	Jovana Janković	
2009	Duška Vučinić	SF2, Final	RTS1, RTS Digital, RTS Sat	Jovana Janković	
2010	Duška Vučinić; Dragan Ilić	SF1, final	RTS1, RTS Sat	Maja Nikolić	
2010	Dragan Ilić	SF2	RTS1, RTS Sat	Maja Nikolić	
2011	Marina Nikolić	SF1	RTS1, RTS Sat	Dušica Spasić	
2011	Dragan Ilić	SF2	RTS1, RTS Sat	Dušica Spasić	
2011	Duška Vučinić	Final	RTS1, RTS Sat	Dušica Spasić	
2011	Tanja Zeljković	SF1, final	Radio Beograd 1	Dušica Spasić	
2012	Dragan Ilić	SF1	RTS1, RTS Sat	Maja Nikolić	
2012	Duška Vučinić	SF2, final	RTS1, RTS Sat	Maja Nikolić	
2012	Tanja Zeljković	Final	Radio Beograd 1	Maja Nikolić	
2013	Duška Vučinić-Lučić	SF1	RTS1, RTS Sat	Maja Nikolić	
2013	Marina Nikolić	SF2	RTS1, RTS Sat	Maja Nikolić	
2013	Silvana Grujić	Final	RTS2, RTS Digital, RTS Sat, RTS HD	Maja Nikolić	
2014	Silvana Grujić	All shows	RTS1, RTS Digital, RTS Sat, RTS HD	Did not participate	
2015	Duška Vučinić	SF1, Final	RTS1, RTS Sat, RTS HD	Maja Nikolić	
2015	Silvana Grujić	SF2	RTS2, RTS Sat	Maja Nikolić	
2015	Katarina Epstein and Nataša Raketić	Final	Radio Beograd 1	Maja Nikolić	
2016	Dragan Ilić	SF1	RTS1, RTS Sat, RTS HD	Dragana Kosjerina	
2016	Duška Vučinić	SF2, final	RTS1, RTS Sat, RTS HD	Dragana Kosjerina	
2017	Silvana Grujić and Olga Kapor	SF1	RTS1, RTS Sat, RTS HD	Sanja Vučić	
2017	Duška Vučinić	SF2, final	RTS1, RTS Sat, RTS HD	Sanja Vučić	
2018	Silvana Grujić and Tamara Petković	SF1	RTS1, RTS Sat, RTS HD	Dragana Kosjerina	
2018	Duška Vučinić	SF2, final	RTS1, RTS Sat, RTS HD	Dragana Kosjerina	
2018	Nataša Raketić and Katarina Epstein	SF2, final	Radio Beograd 1	Dragana Kosjerina	
2019	Duška Vučinić	SF1, final	RTS1, RTS HD, RTS Svet	Dragana Kosjerina	
2019	Tamara Petković and Katarina Epstein	SF2	RTS1, RTS HD, RTS Svet	Dragana Kosjerina	
2019	Nikoleta Dojčinović and Katarina Epstein	Final	Radio Beograd 1	Dragana Kosjerina	
2021	Duška Vučinić	All shows	RTS1, RTS HD, RTS Svet	Dragana Kosjerina	
2021	Nikoleta Dojčinović and Katarina Epstein	All shows	Radio Beograd 1	Dragana Kosjerina	
2022	Silvana Grujić	SF1	RTS1, RTS Svet	Dragana Kosjerina	
2022	Duška Vučinić	SF2, final	RTS1, RTS Svet	Dragana Kosjerina	
2022	Nikoleta Dojčinović and Katarina Epstein	All shows	Radio Beograd 1	Dragana Kosjerina	
2023 (Note: Due to technical issues, Tijana Lukić commentated from Belgrade during the first 15 minutes of the first semi-final.)	Duška Vučinić	All shows	RTS Svet	Dragana Kosjerina	
2023	Duška Vučinić	Semi-finals	RTS 3	Dragana Kosjerina	
2023	Duška Vučinić	Final	RTS 1	Dragana Kosjerina	
2023	Nikoleta Dojčinović and Katarina Epstein	Final	Radio Beograd 1	Dragana Kosjerina	
2024	Duška Vučinić	All shows	RTS1, (Note: During the broadcast of the first semi-final on RTS 1, during the Polish performance, the broadcast was moved to RTS 2 with no warning, so the former could air the arrival ceremony of the General Secretary of the Chinese Communist Party Xi Jinping. The broadcast was restored to RTS 1 following the end of the performance of Poland, performances from Iceland, Croatia, and the first part of the German performance. RTS 2 broadcast approximately 25 minutes of the semi-final.) RTS Svet	Konstrakta	
2024	Katarina Epstein	SF1	Radio Beograd 1	Konstrakta	
2024	Nikoleta Dojčinović and Katarina Epstein	Final	Radio Beograd 1	Konstrakta	
2025	Duška Vučinić	All shows	RTS 1, RTS Svet	Dragana Kosjerina	
2025	Nikoleta Dojčinović and Katarina Tošić	SF2	Radio Beograd 1	Dragana Kosjerina	
2026	Duška Vučinić	All shows	RTS 1, RTS Svet	Kristina Radenković	
2026	Nikoleta Dojčinović	SF1	Radio Beograd 1	Kristina Radenković	

==== Other shows ====
Show	Commentator	Channel	Ref.
Eurovision: Europe Shine a Light	Duška Vučinić	RTS1, RTS Svet	

== Kosovan entrants ==
After Kosovo's declaration of independence from Serbia in 2008, its broadcaster Radio Television of Kosovo (RTK) was applying for EBU membership, and wished to enter Kosovo independently into the Eurovision Song Contest 2009. Kosovo is partially recognised and not a member of the United Nations, and UN membership is required to obtain full EBU membership. As of 2013, RTK has observer status within the EBU and has participated in the Eurovision Young Dancers once. Several Kosovo Albanian artists have competed in Festivali i Këngës, the national selection for Albania organised by RTSH. The most notable Kosovo Albanian participants to date are Rona Nishliu, Lindita, and Albina Kelmendi and her family, who represented Albania in 2012, 2017 and 2023, respectively.

Several Kosovo Serb artists have competed in the Serbian national selections organised by RTS. Kosovo-born Nevena Božović represented Serbia in the Junior Eurovision Song Contest and twice in the Eurovision Song Contest, first as a member of Moje 3 in 2013 and later as a solo artist in 2019.

== Photo gallery ==
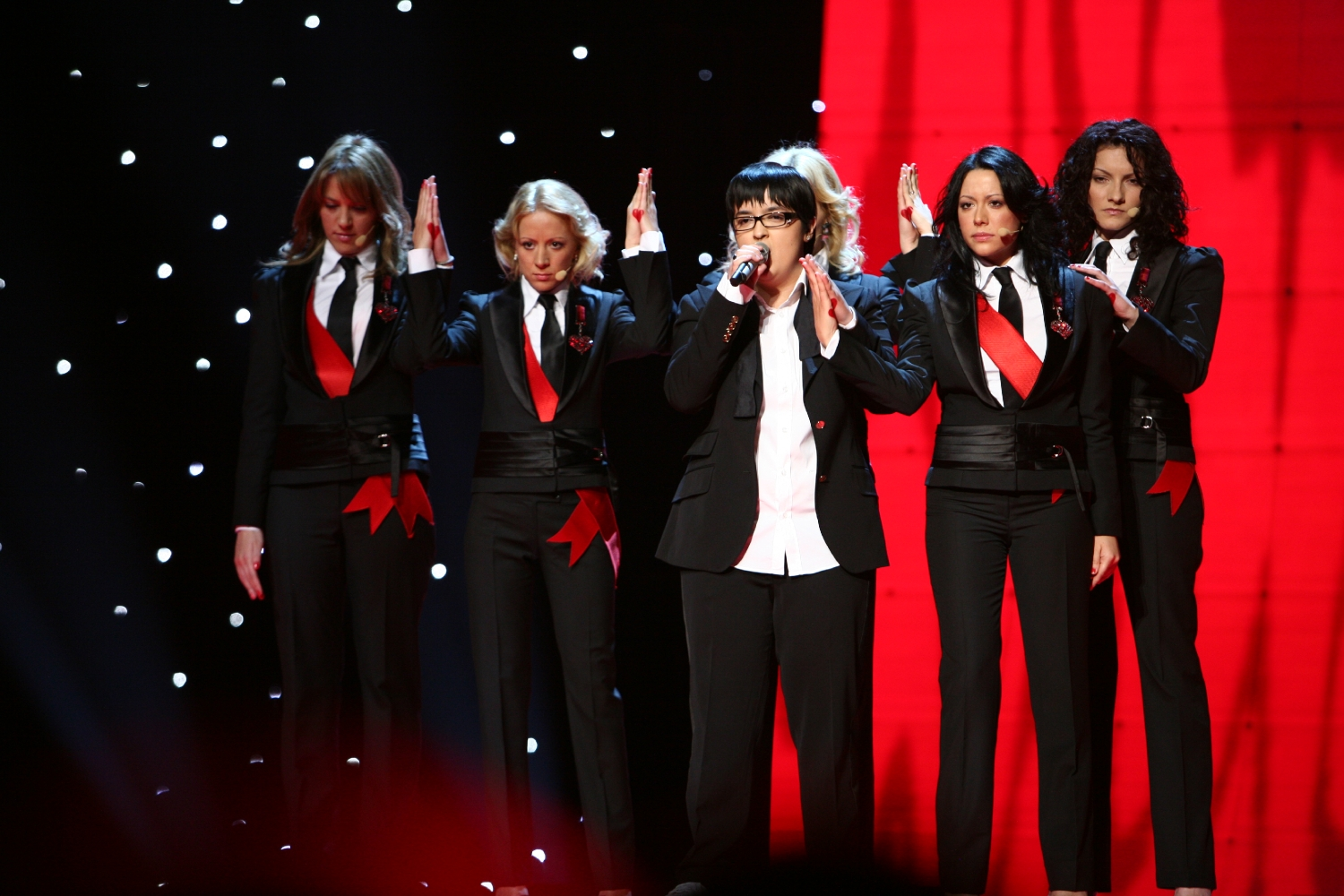
Marija Šerifović in Helsinki (2007)

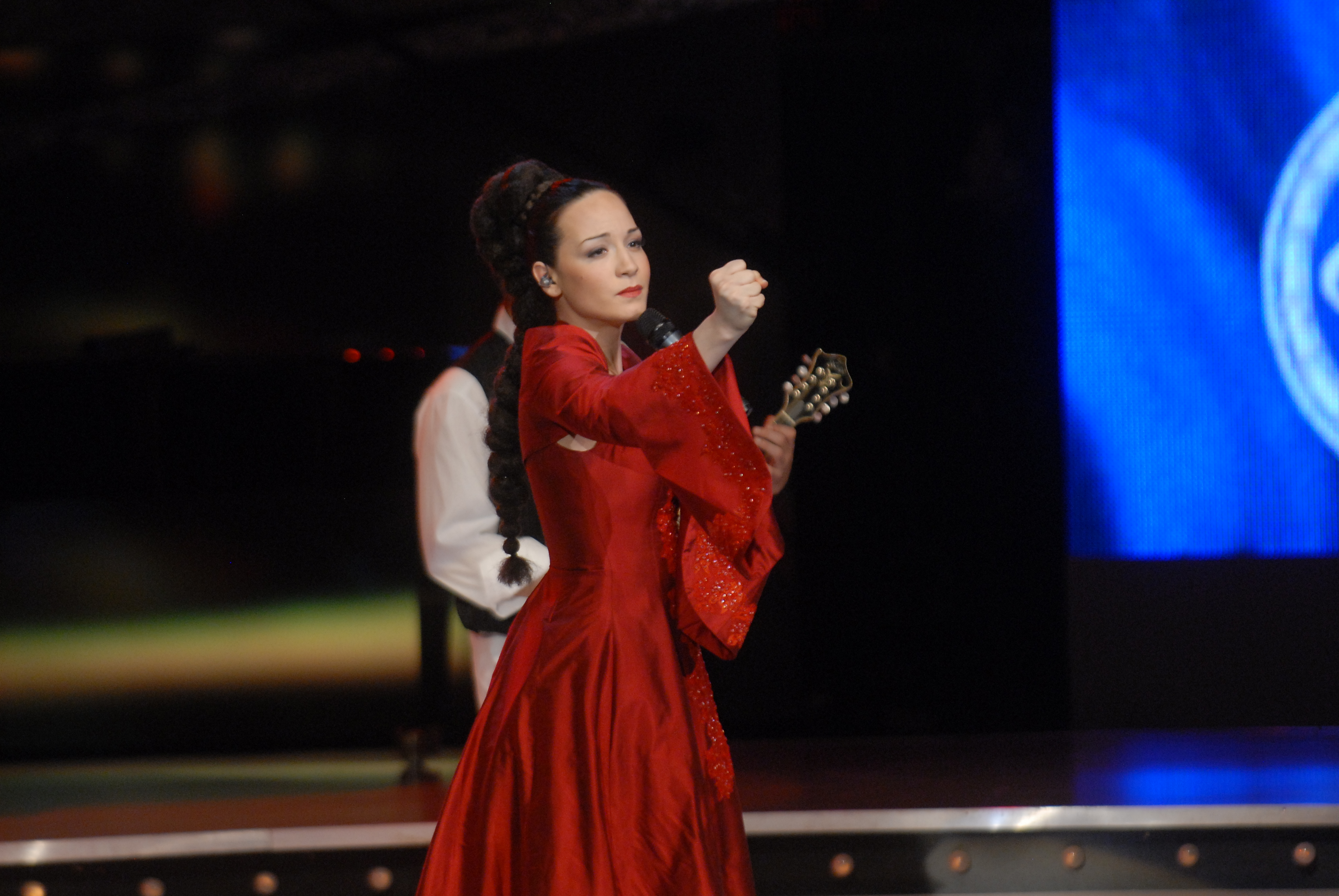
Jelena Tomašević in Belgrade (at the national selection for the 2008 contest)

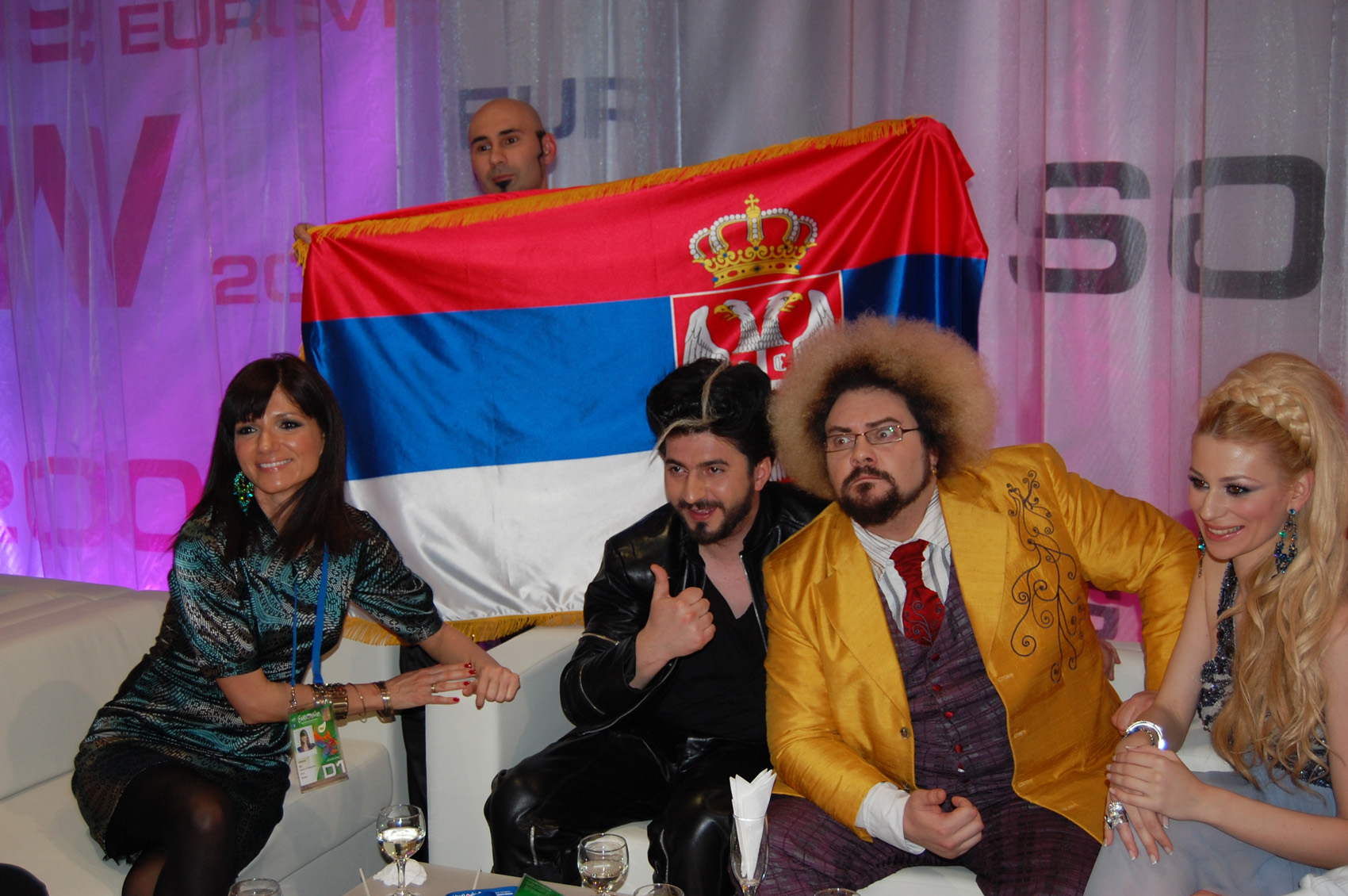
Marko Kon in Moscow (2009)

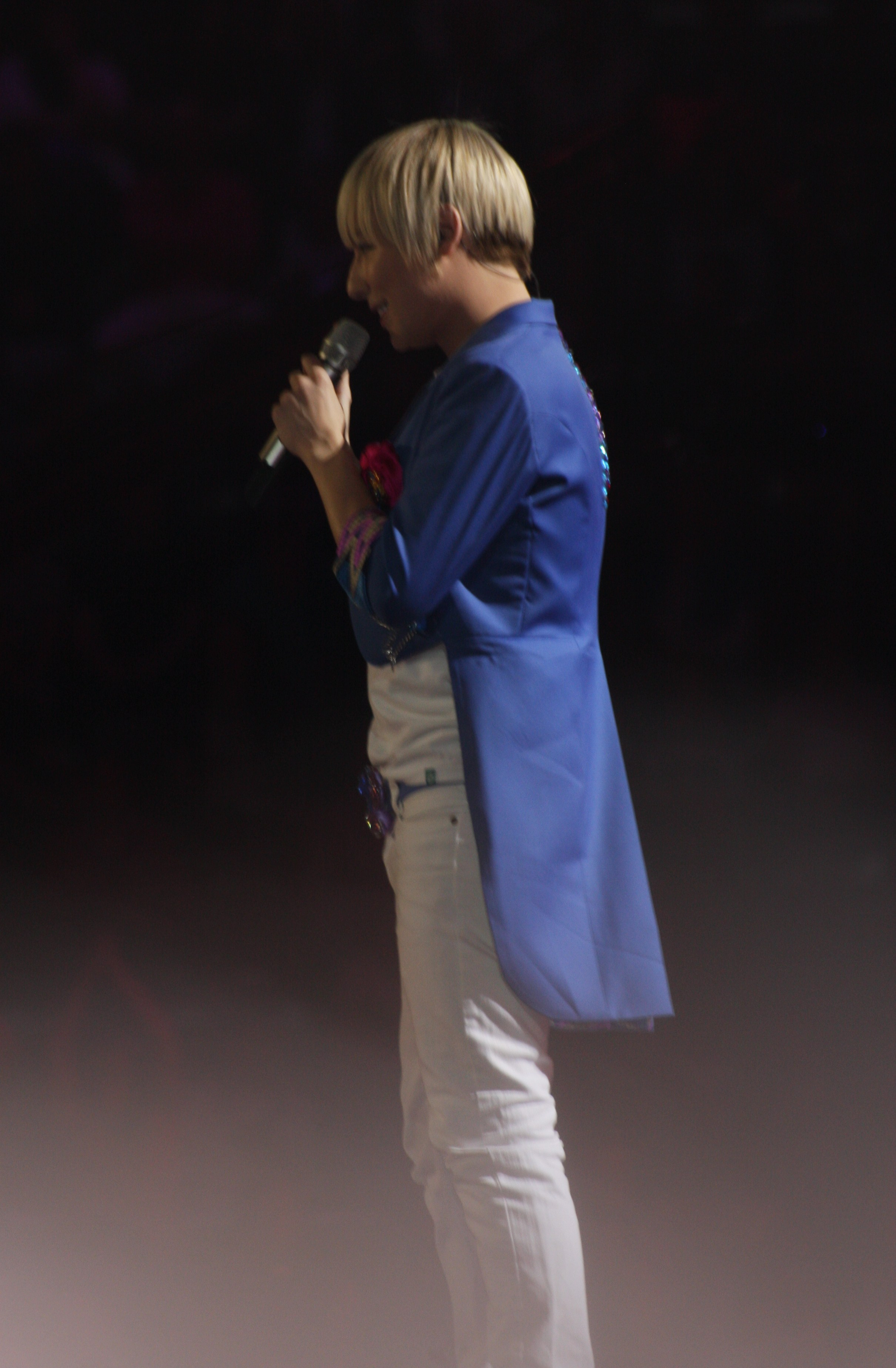
Milan Stanković in Oslo (2010)

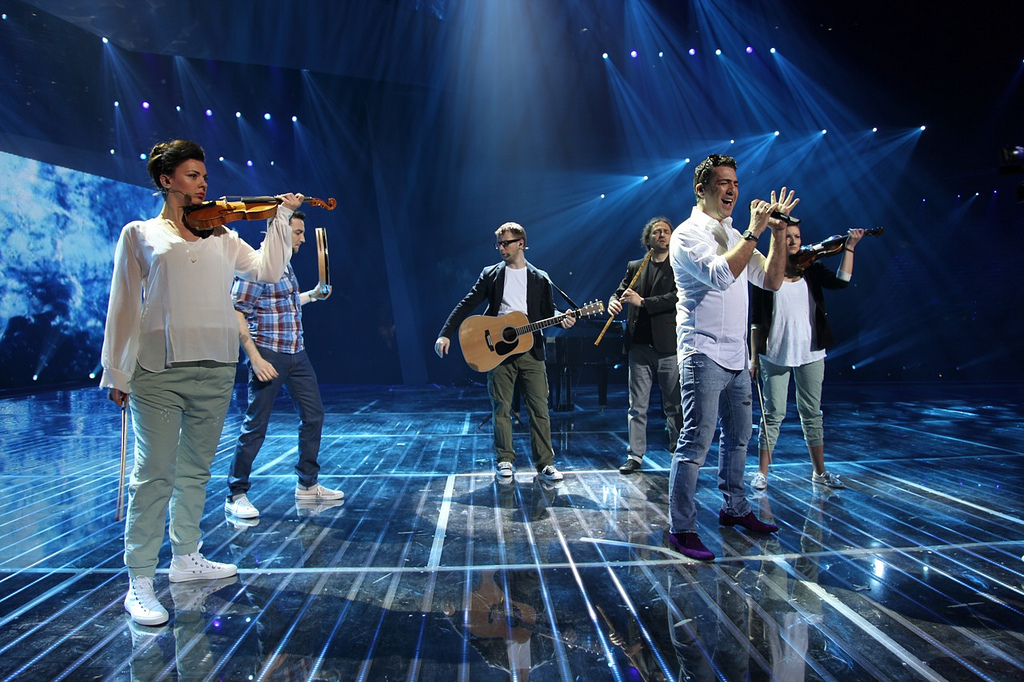
Željko Joksimović in Baku (2012)

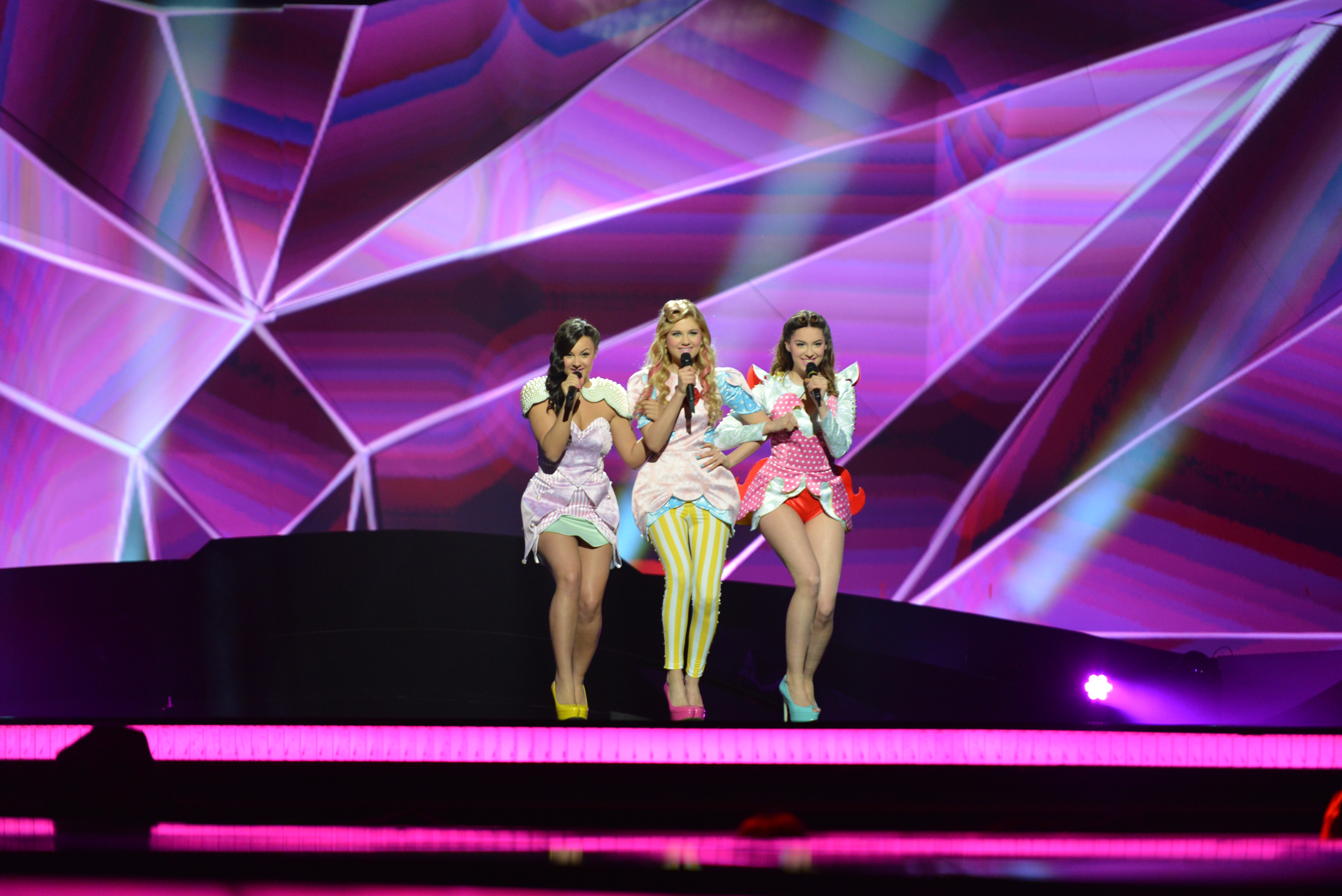
Moje 3 in Malmö (2013)

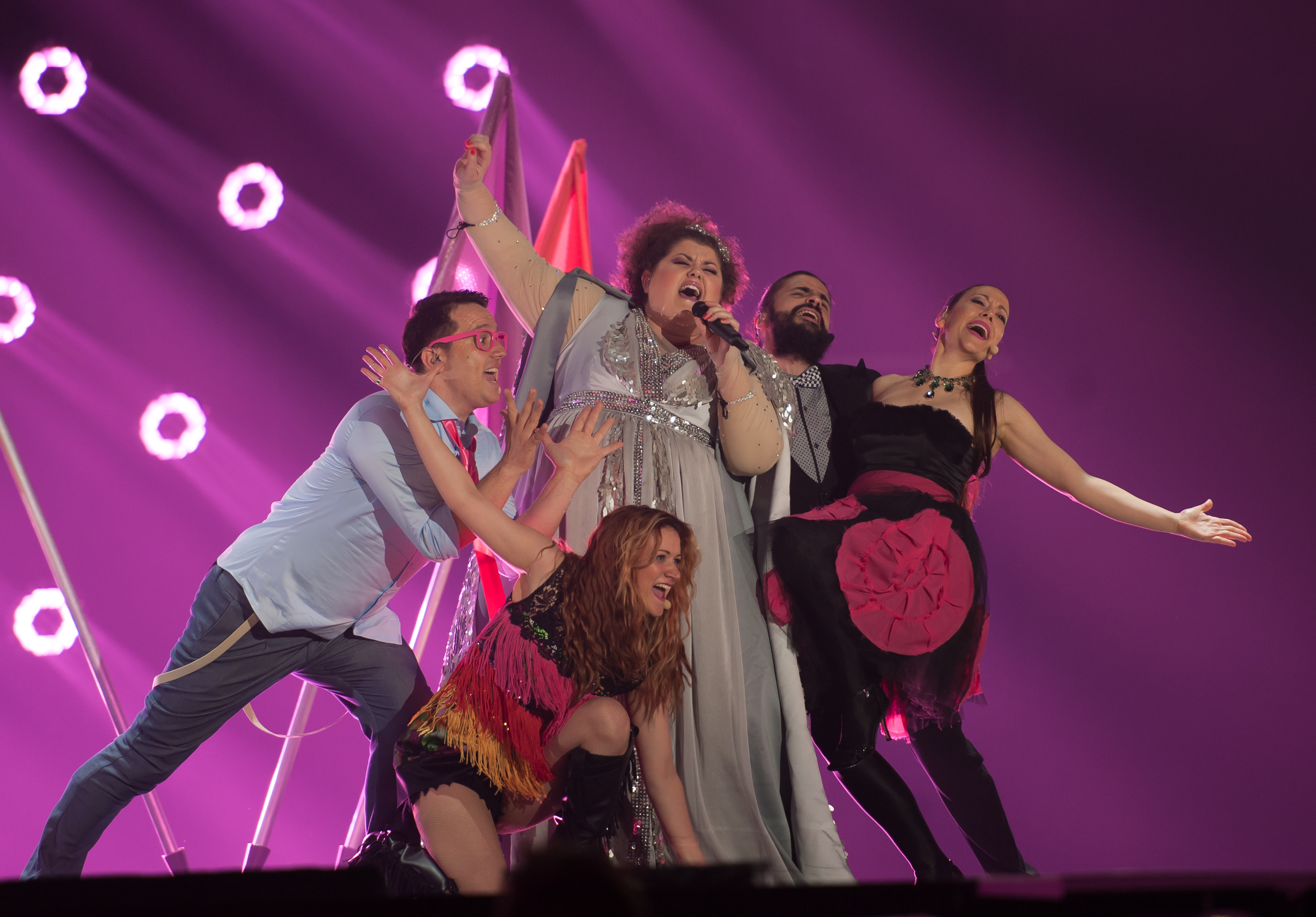
Bojana Stamenov in Vienna (2015)

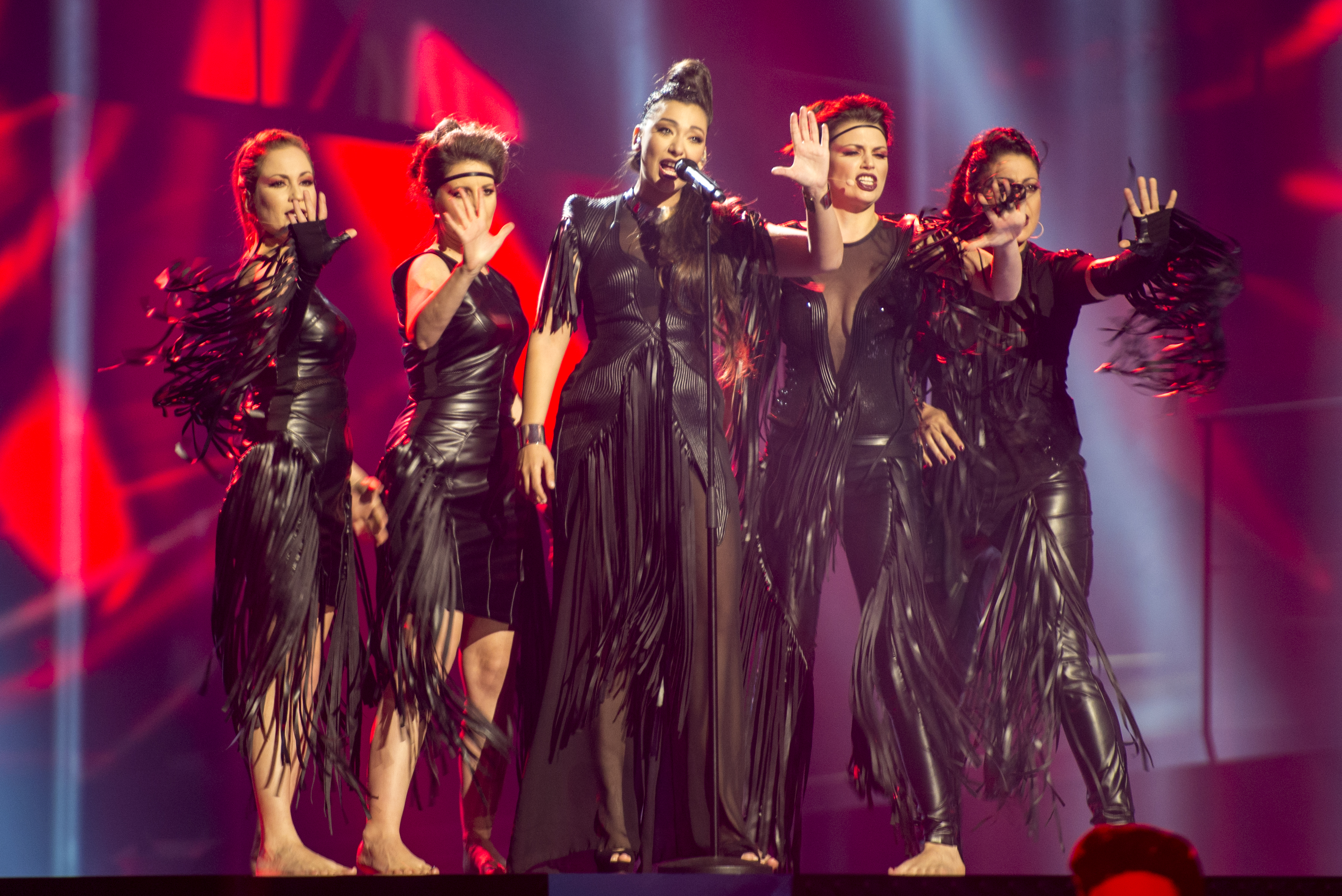
Sanja Vučić in Stockholm (2016)

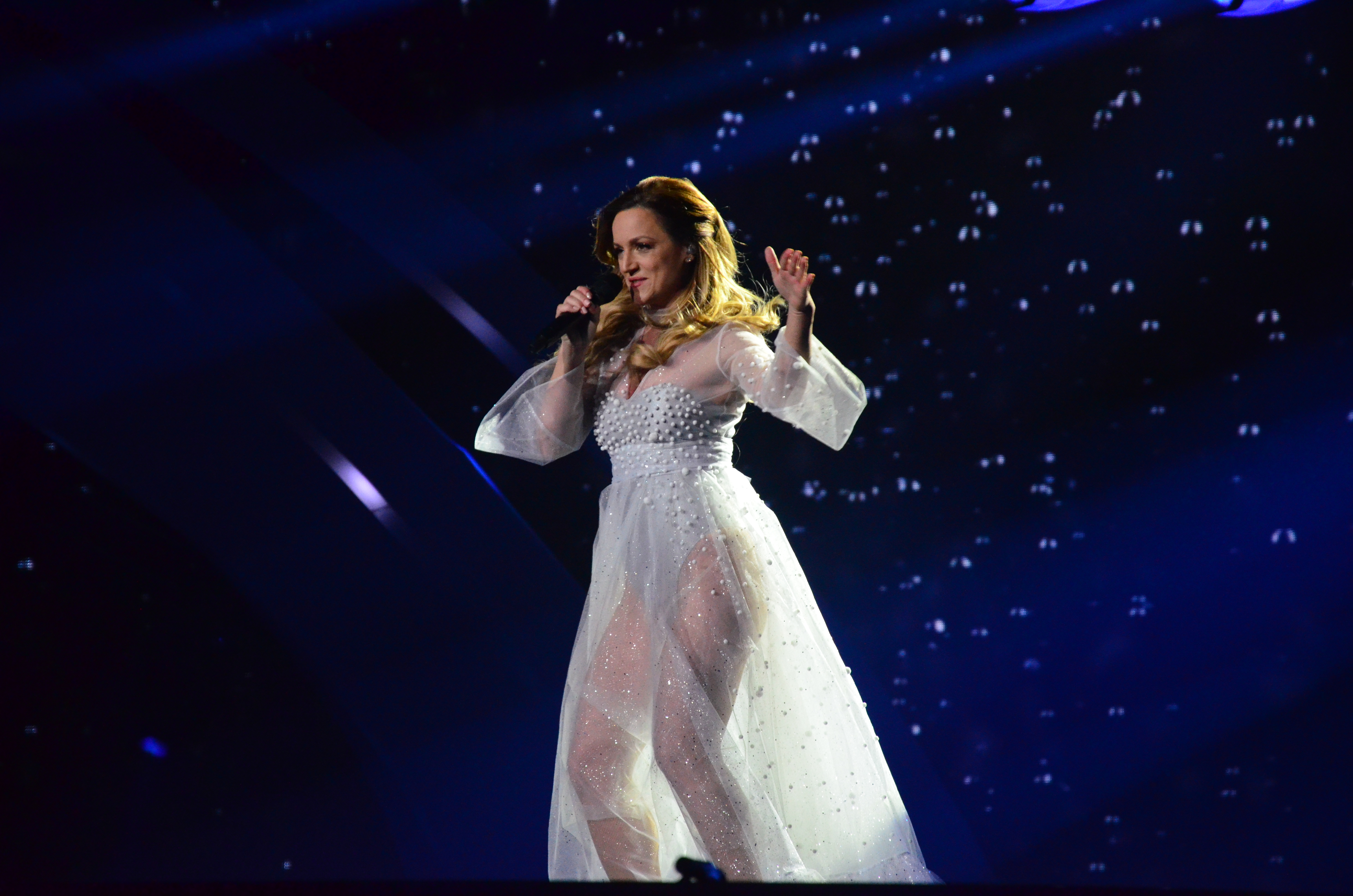
Tijana Bogićević in Kyiv (2017)

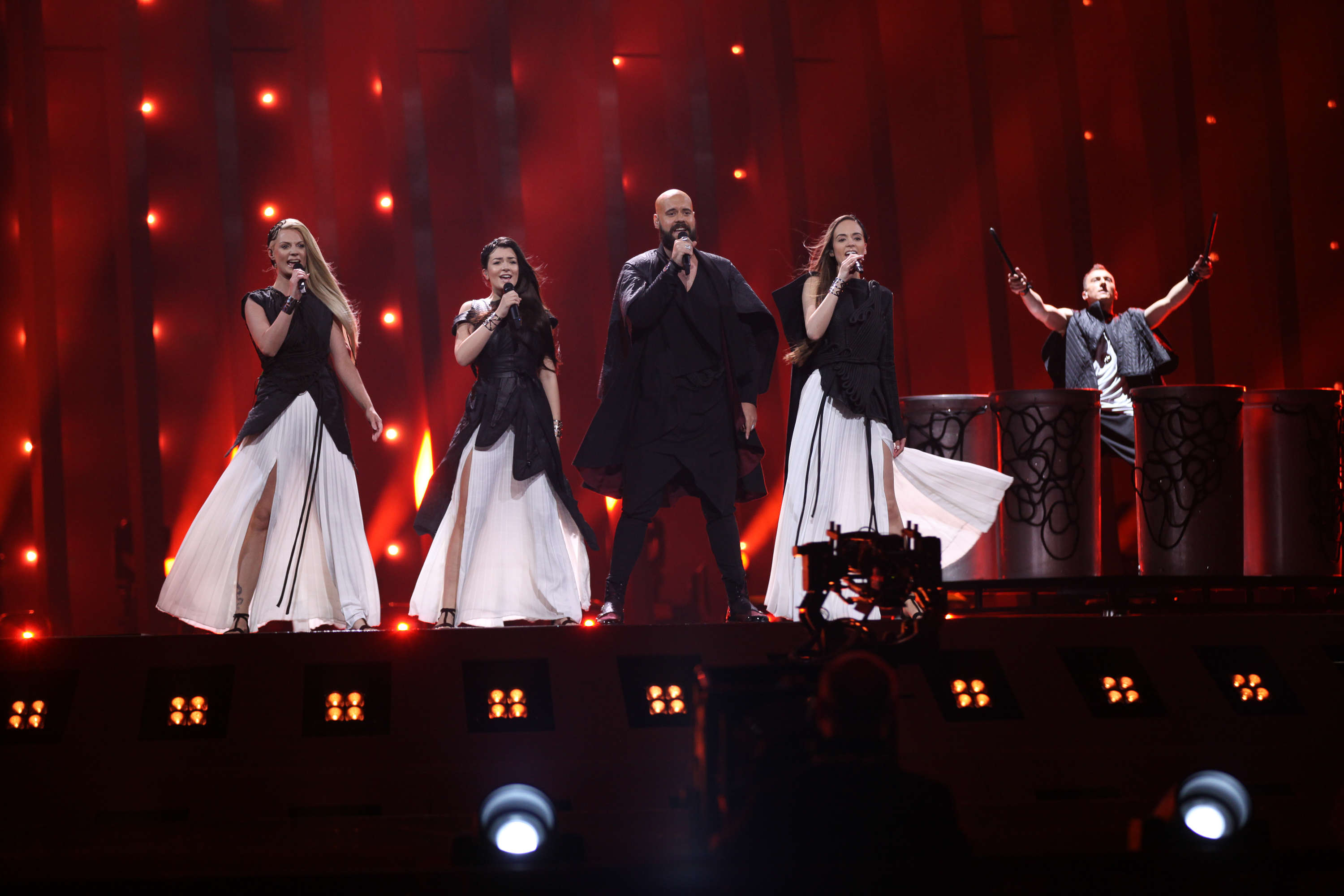
Sanja Ilić and Balkanika in Lisbon (2018)

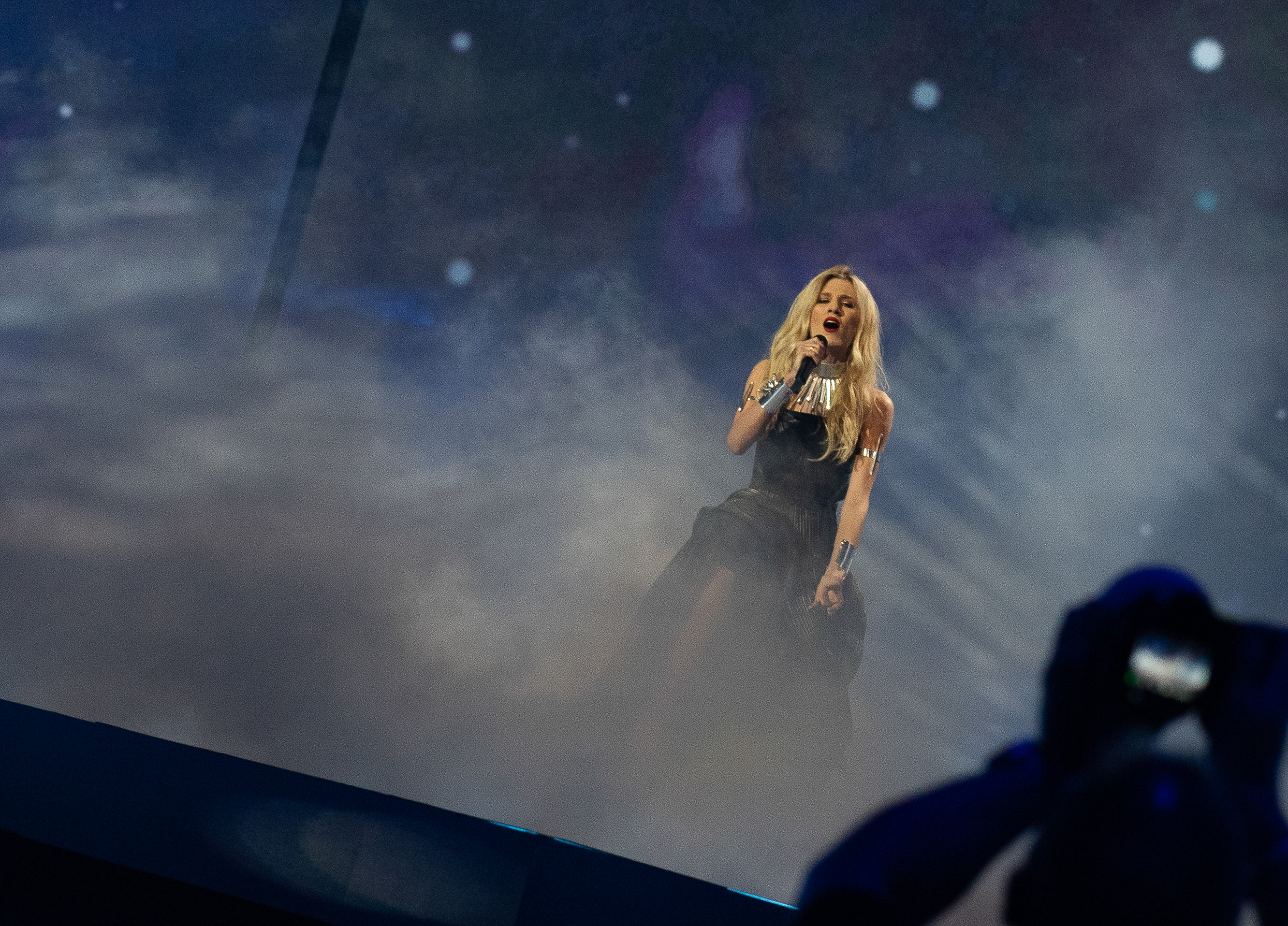
Nevena Božović in Tel Aviv (2019)

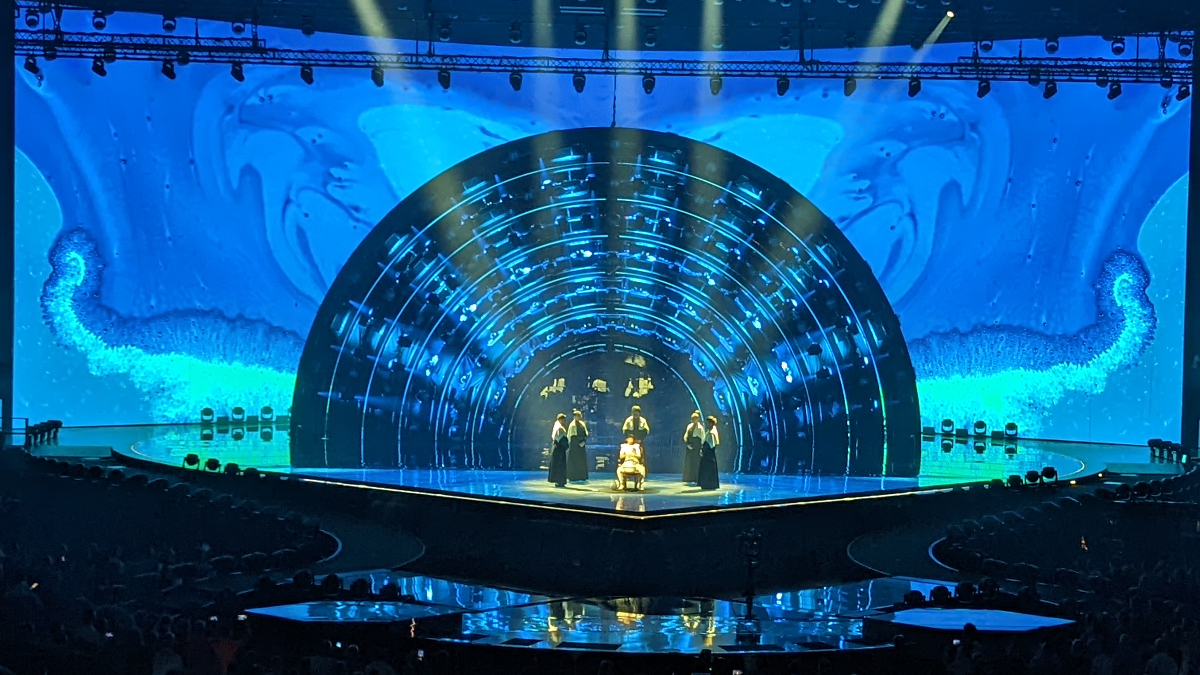
Konstrakta in Turin (2022)

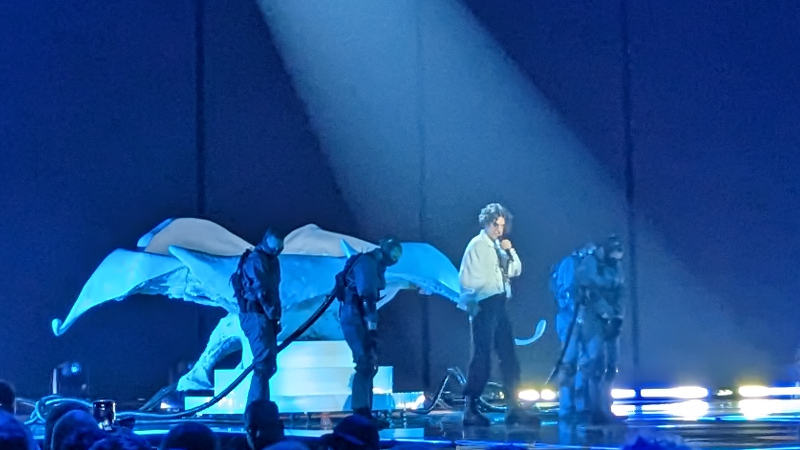
Luke Black in Liverpool (2023)

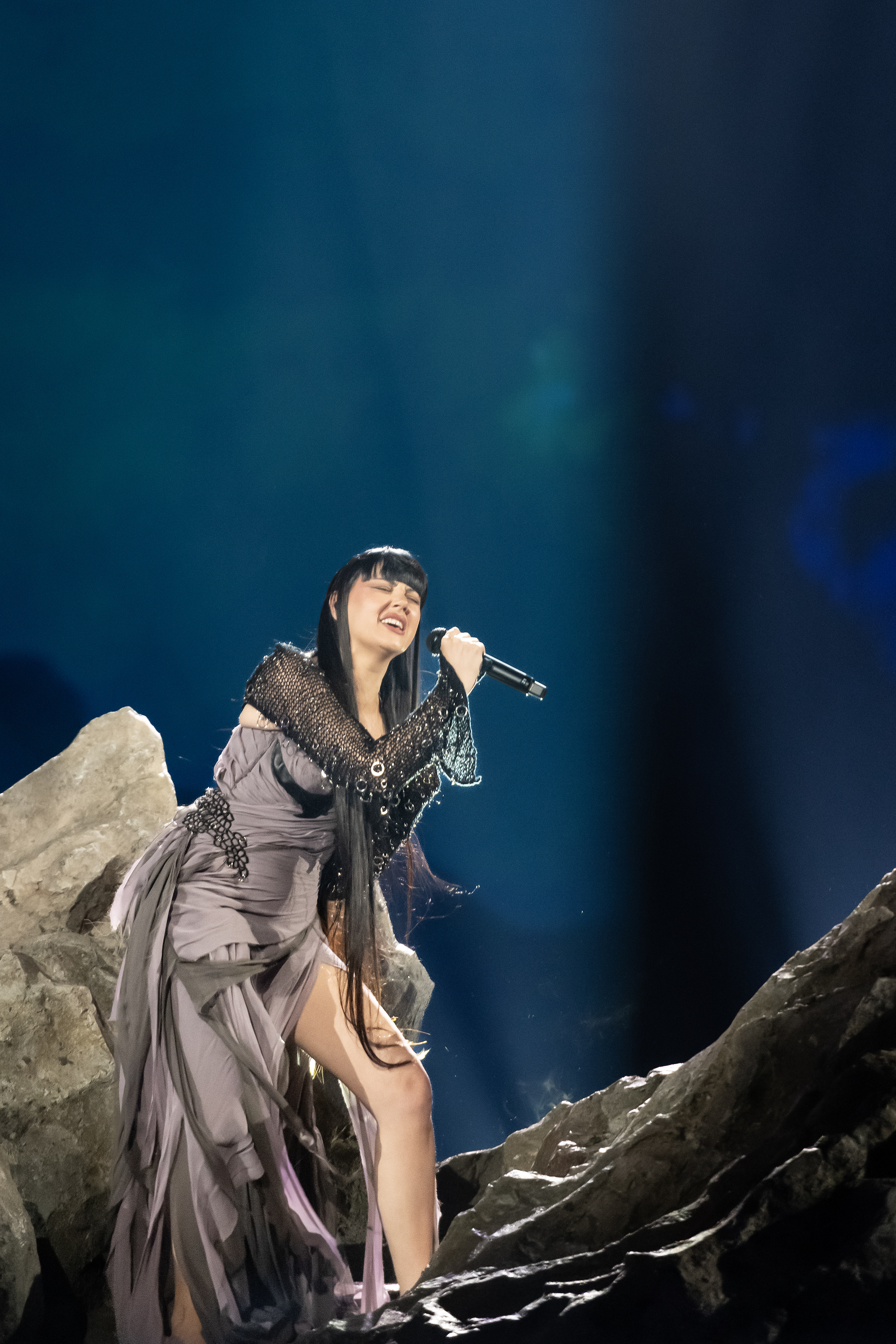
Teya Dora in Malmö (2024)

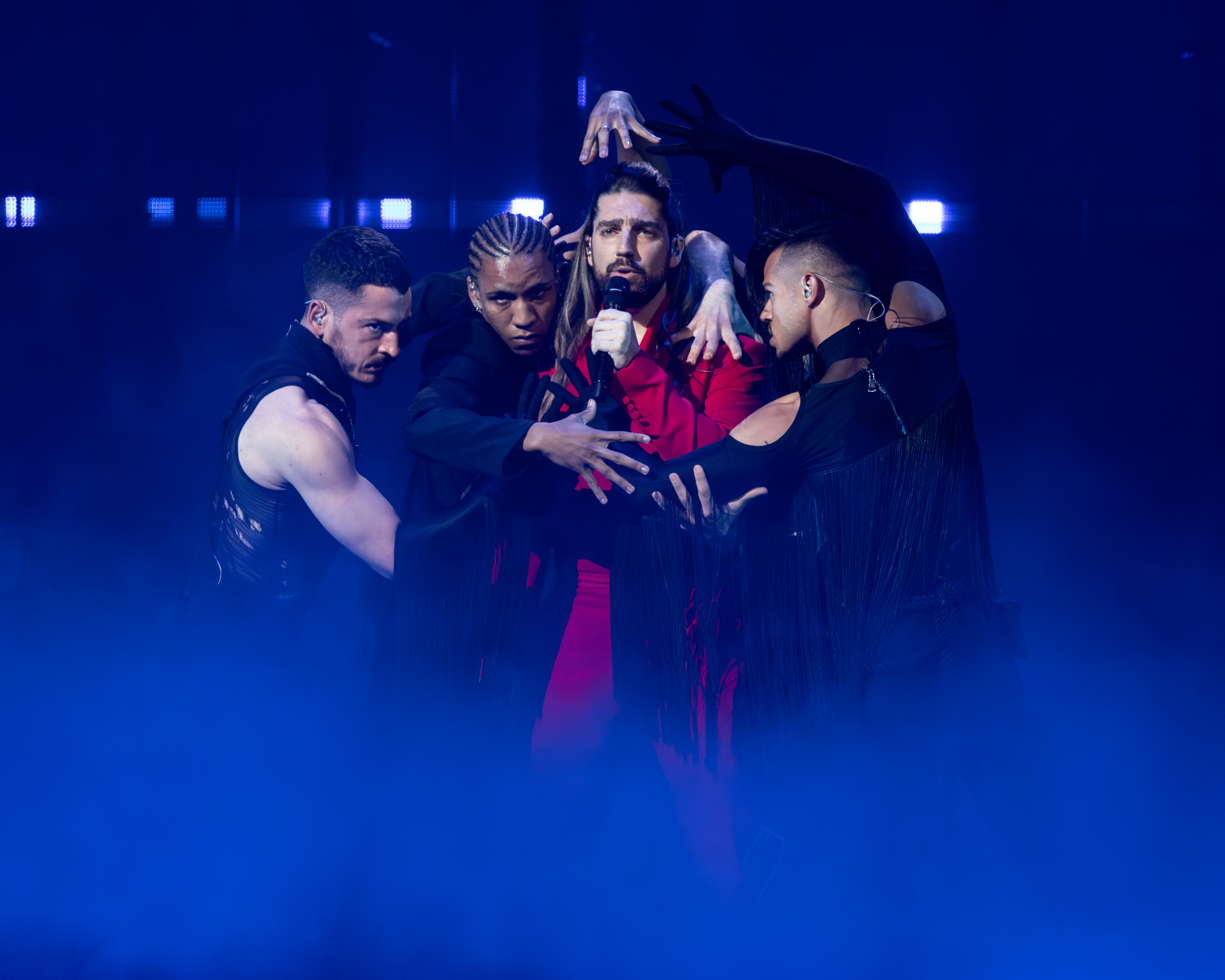
Princ in Basel (2025)

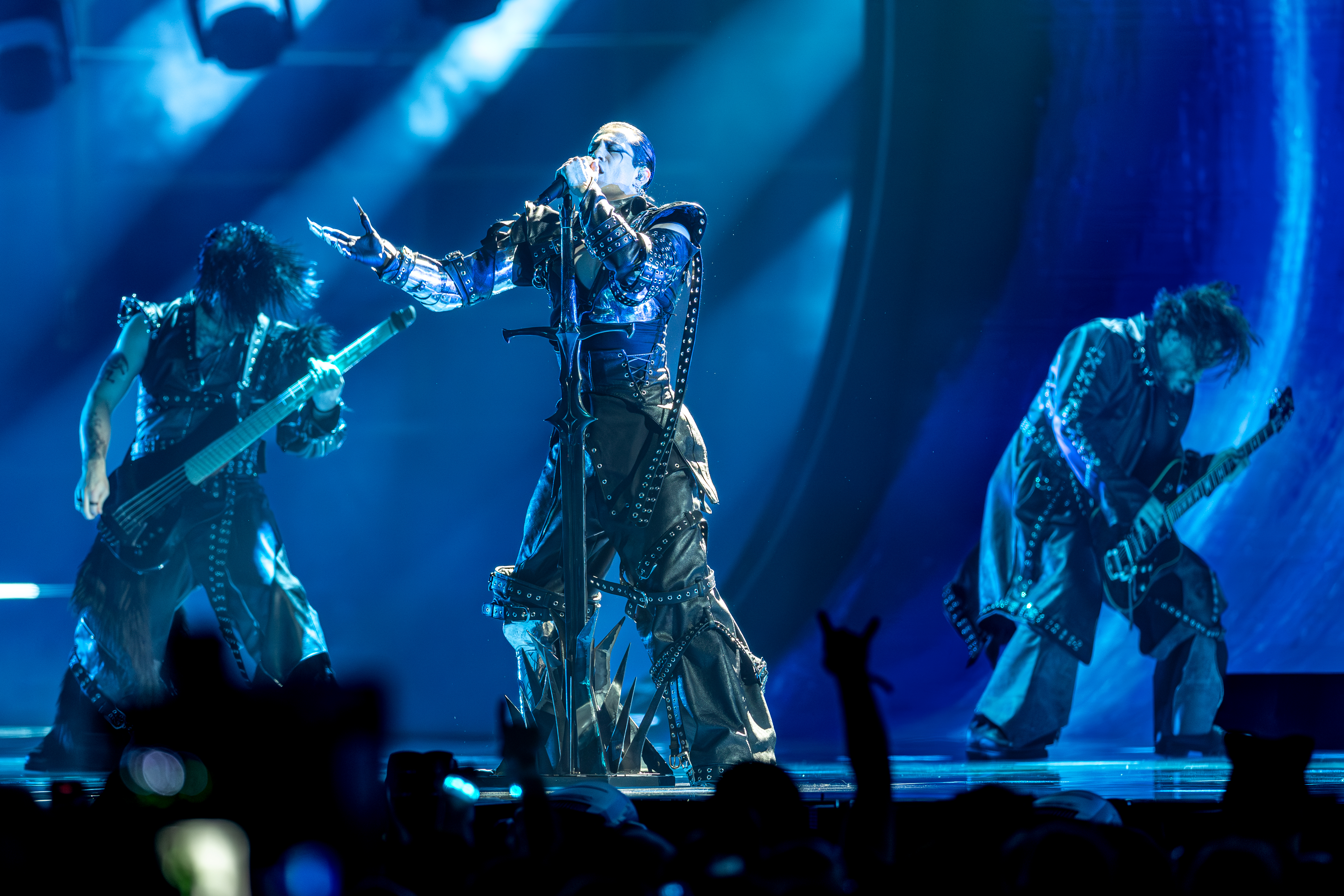
Lavina in Vienna (2026)

== See also ==
- Serbia in the Junior Eurovision Song Contest
- Serbia and Montenegro in the Eurovision Song Contest
- Serbia and Montenegro in the Junior Eurovision Song Contest
- Yugoslavia in the Eurovision Song Contest
