= Sanja Ilić =

Serbian composer (1951–2021)

Sanja Ilić Сања Илић
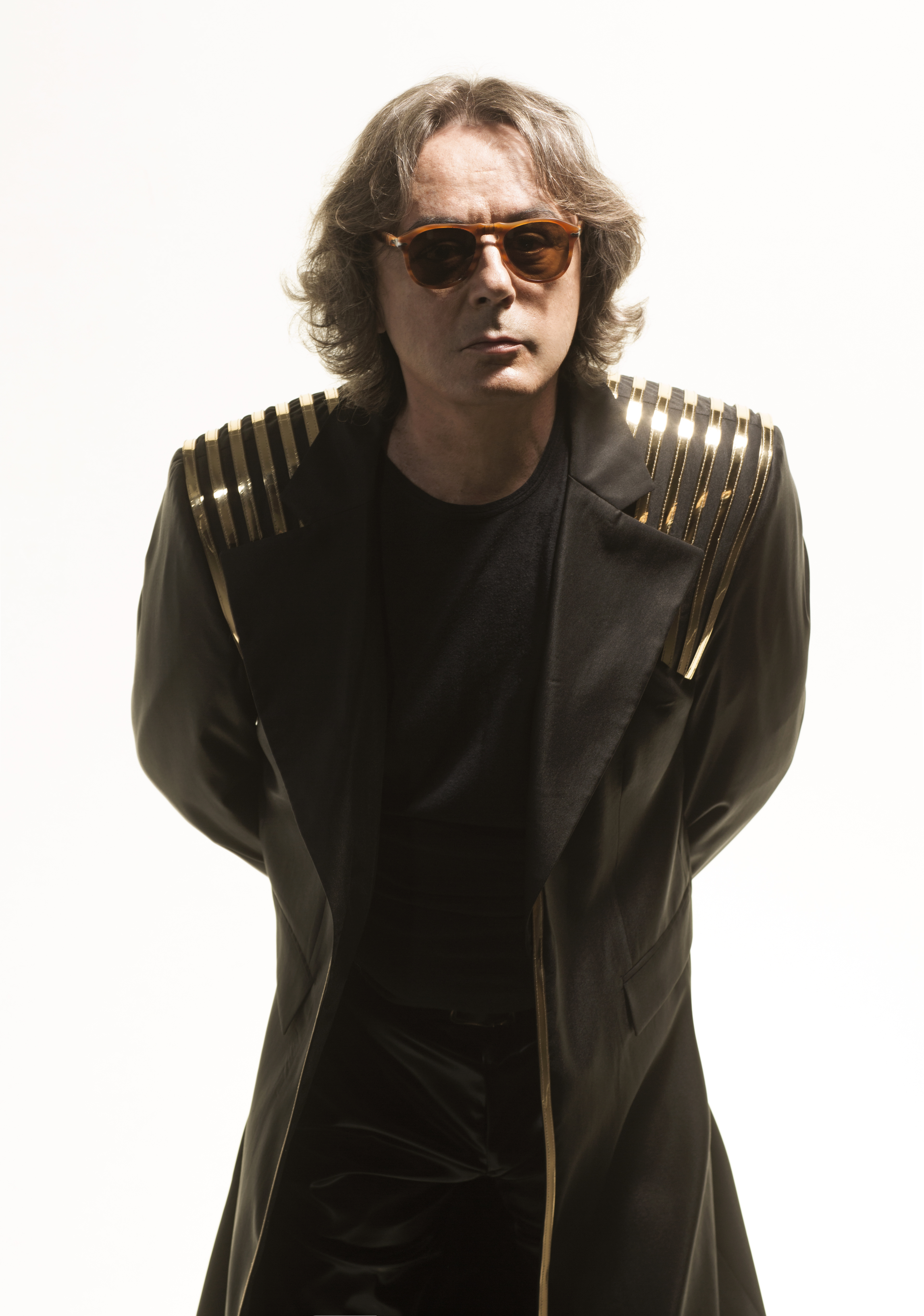
- Ilić in 2015

Background information
- Born: Aleksandar Ilić; 27 March 1951; Belgrade, PR Serbia, FPR Yugoslavia
- Died: 7 March 2021 (aged 69) Belgrade, Serbia
- Genres: Rock; electronic music; ethnic music; world music; medieval music; Byzantine music; Balkan brass; folktronica
- Occupations: Composer; keyboardist
- Instrument: Keyboard
- Years active: 1963–2021
- Formerly of: San, Mag, Balkanika

Aleksandar "Sanja" Ilić (Serbian Cyrillic: Александар "Сања" Илић; 27 March 1951 – 7 March 2021) was a Serbian and Yugoslav musician and composer.

Ilić started composing as a teenager. In 1971 he formed the rock band San, which disbanded in 1975, after the band's vocalist Predrag Jovičić died in concert from an electric shock. After San split up, Ilić continued his career as a composer, authoring several hit songs for Yugoslav pop and rock artists. He collaborated with composer and keyboardist Sloba Marković on the electronic music album Delta Project and with actor and lyricist Irfan Mensur on the album Plava ptica. In 2000, Ilić formed the ethnic music ensemble Balkanika, with which he recorded five albums and had numerous performances across the world. During his career, Ilić wrote music for theatre, film, television shows and various performers. He died in 2021 in Belgrade. He was the brother of rock musician and composer Dragoljub Ilić and husband of actress Zlata Petković.

== Life and career ==
=== Early life and career ===
Ilić was born on 27 March 1951 in Belgrade. Ilić's father, Miodrag "Beli" Ilić was a well-known composer. Sanja Ilić composed his first song when he was 12. At the age of 16, he composed the song "Baj baj baj" ("Bye, Bye, Bye"), which was later performed by Bisera Veletanlić at Jugovizija 1976 festival. In 1967, he joined the high school band Vragolani (The Imps). He graduated from the University of Belgrade Faculty of Architecture.

=== San (1970–1975) ===
In 1970, Ilić formed the band San (The Dream) with former members of Bele Višnje and Smeli. With San Ilić recorded five 7" singles. Durig the band's run, Ilić also wrote music for the film ITD (ETC.) and the rock opera Arhanđeli i automati (Archangels and Automatons) performed in Belgrade's Dadov Theatre. On 2 February 1975, during a concert in Čair Hall in Niš, San vocalist Predrag Jovičić died from an electric shock. After this event Ilić disbanded San and decided not to perform live with a band again. In 1977, as a tribute to Jovičić, the members of San recorded songs they prepared for their debut album with singers Zdravko Čolić, Dado Topić, Bisera Veletanlić, Zdenka Kovačiček and Zlatko Pejaković.

=== Post-San (1975–2000) ===
In 1979, Ilić was a member of the supergroup Mag (Wizard), formed for the recording of the soundtrack for Goran Marković's film National Class Category Up to 785 ccm. Mag consisted of former Korni Grupa member Josip Boček (guitar), former Elipse and Korni Grupa members Bojan Hreljac (bass guitar) and Vladimir "Furda" Furduj (drums), composer and musician Sloba Marković (keyboards) and Ilić (keyboards). Mag recorded songs written by composer Zoran Simjanović and lyricist Marina Tucaković. The vocals were provided by popular Yugoslav singers Dado Topić, Oliver Dragojević, Slađana Milošević, Oliver Mandić, Zumreta Midžić "Zuzi" and the members of the band Laboratorija Zvuka.

Ilić continued his career as a composer. In 1982, he composed the song "Halo, Halo" ("Hello, Hello"), with which the group Aska represented Yugoslavia in the Eurovision Song Contest 1982. In 1984, he composed the hit song "Princeza" ("Princess"), performed by rock singers Dado Topić and Slađana Milošević. In 1987, Ilić recorded the electronic music album Delta Project with composer and keyboardist Sloba Marković. In 1992, on the lyrics of actor Irfan Mensur, Ilić composed music for the theatre play Plava ptica (Blue Bird). The songs were released on the album Plava ptica. The title track, performed by well-known Serbian actors, became a hit, largely due to its anti-war lyrics.

=== With Balkanika (2000–2021) ===
In 2000, Ilić founded the ethnic music ensemble Balkanika. In 2000, they released their first album, entitled Balkan 2000. Ilić composed all the tracks on the album, played piano and saz on the album recording and produced the album. The album featured more than 90 musicians, including Brankica Vasić, Svetlana "Ceca" Slavković, Nataša Jelić, Marijana Kalajić, Đorđe David and Pavle Aksentijević on vocals, Dragoljub Ilić on keyboards, Slobodan Trkulja on gajde and kaval, Dragomir "Joga" Milenković on cümbüş, Veljko "Papa Nick" Nikolić on percussion, Branko Kljajić on bouzouki, Bora Dugić on flute, Ljuba Dimitrijević on blowing horn and shawm, Darko Karajić on oud and saz, St. George String Orchestra, Radio Television of Serbia Choir, and others. The album songs inspired the TV show entitled Ostrvo Balkan (Island of Balkan), directed by Miša Vukobratić. After the album release, Balkanika performed across Europe, in China and in Mexico. In 2000, Ilić also took part in the Balkan Horses Band project. On 10 November 2000, Ilić performed, alongsite guitarist Vlatko Stefanovski, vocalist and flutist Tamara Obrovac and vocalist and kaval and melodica player Theodosii Spassov, on a concert in Sofia, Bulgaria. The recording of the concert was released in 2001 on the live album Balkan Horses Band – Sofia 2000.

In 2004, Ilić released his second album with Balkanika, Balkan koncept (Balkan Concept). Among Ilić's new collaborators were Izet Kizil (percussion), Peter Kostadinov (gajde), Miljan Miljanić (gusle) and Rastko Aksentijević (šargija). Once again, Ilić authored all the tracks and produced the album. The album featured a new version of the song "Plava ptica". On 21 September 2005, the band held a concert entitled Putem Teslinih misli (Following Tesla's Thoughts) at Belgrade's Kalemegdan Fortress. The performance featured a choir and a symphony orchestra, and the recording of the concert was released on the DVD Live at Kalemegdan in 2006.

In 2009, Sanja Ilić and Balkanika released the album Ceeepaj (Gooo), with which they moved towards Balkan brass sound. The album featured a cover of the song "Maljčiki" (Russian for "Boys"), originally recorded by the Yugoslav new wave band Idoli. In 2013, Ilić composed the work Constantinus Magnustantinus Magnus, which was performed in Belgrade and Niš as a part of the celebration of 1700 years since the Edict of Milan. The work was performed by more than 200 performers, including the members of Balkanika, Belgrade National Theatre orchestra, choir and ballet dancers. Constantinus Magnustantinus Magnus featured elements of the music of ancient Rome and was partially performed on ancient Roman instruments. In 2018, Ilić and Balkanika represented Serbia in the Eurovision Song Contest 2018 in Lisbon, Portugal, with the song "Nova deca" ("New Children").

In 2020, Balkanika released their fourth studio album, Stand Up. The album featured a new version of "Nova deca" as the bonus track. Part of the album songs were in English language, with vocals provided by Mladen Lukić.

=== Other works ===
Ilić composed songs for numerous Yugoslav performers, including Bisera Veletanlić, Lutajuća Srca, Zdravko Čolić, Zlatko Pejaković, Jadranka Stojaković, Suzana Mančić, Zdenka Kovačiček, Neda Ukraden, Maja Odžaklievska, Leo Martin, Slađana Milošević, Gabi Novak, Radmila Karaklajić, 7 Mladih, Jasna Zlokić, Doris Dragović, Bora Dugić, Louis, and others.

During his career Ilić wrote over 1000 compositions for theatre, films, TV shows and commercials. He wrote music for films Dark Echoes (1977), Transfer (1980), Strange Night (1990), Vukovar: A Story (1994), The Border Post (2006), Ambulance (2009) and Ice (2012).

== Death ==
Ilić died on 7 March 2021, in Belgrade, at the age of 69, due to complications caused by COVID-19 during the COVID-19 pandemic in Serbia. He was buried at the Alley of Distinguished Citizens in the Belgrade New Cemetery, next to his wife, Zlata Petković.

On 28 June (Serbian national holiday Vidovdan) 2021, Ilić was posthumously awarded the Golden Medal for Merits by the President of Serbia.

== Family ==
Ilić's brother Dragoljub Ilić is the leader of the hard rock band Generacija 5. The band was named after Sanja Ilić's suggestion; after reading a newspaper article about fifth generation computers, Sanja Ilić suggested the name Generacija 5 (Generation 5).

Ilić was married to Serbian actress and model Zlata Petković until her death in 2012. They had one son together, Andrej, who was born in 1984.

== Awards and honors ==
- Association of Musicians of Belgrade Annual Award
- Association of Composers of Serbia Award
- Golden Medal for Merits

== Discography ==
=== With San ===
==== Singles ====
- "Tebe sam želeo" / "Helena" (1971)
- "Papirni brodovi" / "Hej, malena" (1973)
- "Legenda" / "Milena" (1974)
- "Jedan svet za sve" / "Srce na dlanu" (1974)
- "Anabela" / "Zvezda ljubavi" (1974)

=== Solo ===
==== Studio albums ====
- Delta Project (with Sloba Marković, 1987)
- Plava ptica (1992)

=== With Balkanika ===
==== Studio albums ====
- Balkan 2000 (2000)
- Balkan koncept (2004)
- Ceeepaj (2009)
- Stand Up (2020)

==== Video albums ====
- Live at Kalemegdan (2006)

Preceded by Tijana Bogićević with "In Too Deep"	Serbia in the Eurovision Song Contest; 2018 (with Balkanika)	Succeeded by Nevena Božović with "Kruna"
Preceded by Marko Kon & Milaan	Beovizija winner 2018	Succeeded by Nevena Božović
