= Tijana Bogićević =

Serbian singer

Tijana Bogićević Тијана Богићевић
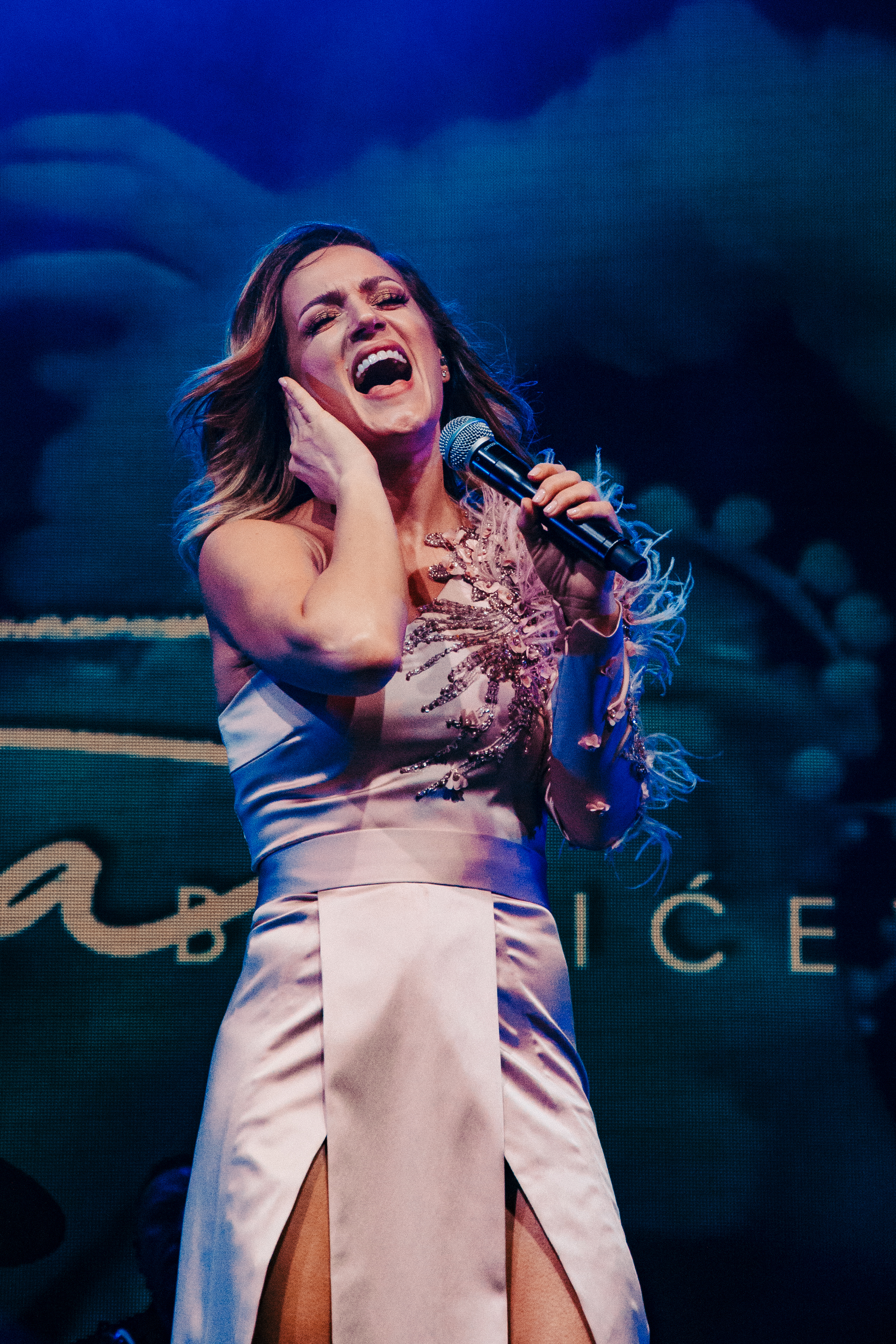
- Tijana Bogićević Live in Concert in 2019

Background information
- Born: 1 November 1981 (age 44); Novi Sad, SR Serbia, SFR Yugoslavia
- Genres: Pop; R&B
- Occupation: Singer
- Instrument: Vocals
- Years active: 2001–present
- Website: https://www.tijanabogicevic.com

Tijana Bogićević (Serbian Cyrillic: Тијана Богићевић, pronounced [tǐjana boɡǐːt͡ɕeʋit͡ɕ]; born 1 November 1981) is a Serbian singer. She represented Serbia in the Eurovision Song Contest 2017 with the song "In Too Deep" but failed to qualify to the final. Bogićević was previously a backing vocalist for Nina at the Eurovision Song Contest 2011. She also competed to represent Serbia in the Eurovision Song Contest 2009 through Beovizija 2009, but did not advance past the semi-final.

Bogićević first achieved major recognition in Serbia in 2013, after the release of her single "Čudo". The following year she released a duet with Aleksa Jelić, "Još jednom". Bogićević currently resides in the United States. She married Mark Robertson, the lead singer of the band Queen Of Hearts, in 2015. but they divorced in 2022.

== Discography ==
=== Albums ===
- Čudo (2018.)
- Blizu (2022.)

=== Singles ===
Title	Year	Peak chart positions	Album
Title	Year	CRO	Album
"Pazi šta radiš"	2009	—	Non-album singles
"Tražim"	2010	—	Čudo
"Kada nisi tu"	2012	—	Non-album singles
"Čudo"	2013	—	Čudo
"Palim se na tebe" (with Flamingosi)	2013	—	Non-album singles
"Tijanina"	2014	—	Čudo
"Stradam"	2014	—	Čudo
"Sam od sutra"	2014	—	Čudo
"Još jednom" (with Aleksa Jelić)	2014	—	Non-album singles
"Nekako nikako"	2015	—	Čudo
"In Too Deep / Tvoja"	2017	—	Non-album singles
"Ti imaš pravo"	2017	—	Čudo
"Bezuslovno"	2017	—	Čudo
"Dodirni me"	2018	—	Non-album singles
"Hram" (with Damir Kedžo)	2021	17	Non-album singles
"—" denotes releases that did not chart or were not released in that territory.

Preceded by Sanja Vučić ZAA with "Goodbye (Shelter)"	Serbia in the Eurovision Song Contest; 2017	Succeeded by Sanja Ilić & Balkanika with "Nova deca"
