= Balkanika =

Serbian musical group

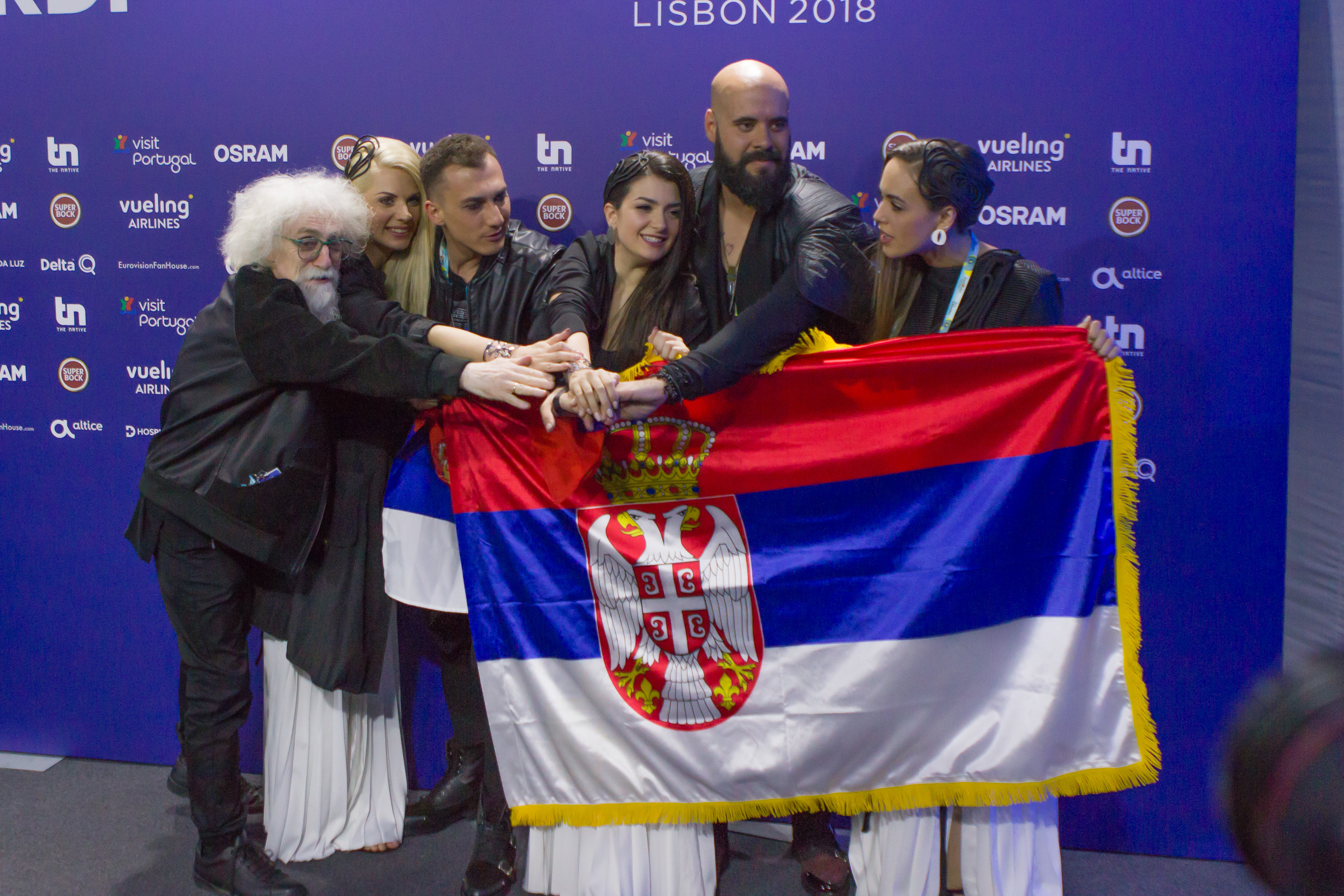
- Balkanika during Eurovision Song Contest 2018 in Lisbon

Background information
- Origin: Belgrade, Serbia
- Genres: World; folk; medieval; Byzantine music; electronic; folktronica
- Years active: 1998–2021
- Label: PGP-RTS
- Members: Aleksandar Radulović; Branimir Marković; Nevena Stamenković; Ljubomir Dimitrijević; Danica Krstić; Marija Bjelanović; Milan Jejina; Mladen Lukić; Nebojša Nedeljković; Nemanja Kojić

Balkanika (Serbian Cyrillic: Балканика) is a Serbian group formed by Sanja Ilić in 1998. They represented Serbia in the Eurovision Song Contest 2018 in Lisbon, Portugal, with the song "Nova deca".

The mission of the group is, as affirmed by Ilić, to preserve, revitalize and modernize Serbian medieval and Byzantine music traditions.

== Members ==
Other members of the group include:

- vocalists: Nevena Stamenković (born 11 April), Danica Krstić (born 25 November 1995), Marija Bjelanović, Mladen Lukić, and Nemanja Kojić
- percussionists: Aleksandar Radulović and Milan Jejina
- guitarists: Branimir Marković and Nebojša Nedeljković
- flautist: Ljubomir Dimitrijević

== Awards ==
Year	Award	Category	City	Result
2019	Music Awards Ceremony	Etno/World Music Song of the Year (Nova Deca)	Belgrade, Serbia	Won

== See also ==
- Eurovision Song Contest 2018
- Serbia in the Eurovision Song Contest
- Serbia in the Eurovision Song Contest 2018

Preceded by Tijana Bogićević with "In Too Deep"	Serbia in the Eurovision Song Contest; 2018	Succeeded by Nevena Božović with "Kruna"
Preceded by Marko Kon & Milaan	Beovizija winner 2018	Succeeded by Nevena Božović
