= Bojana Stamenov =

Bojana Stamenov Бојана Стаменов
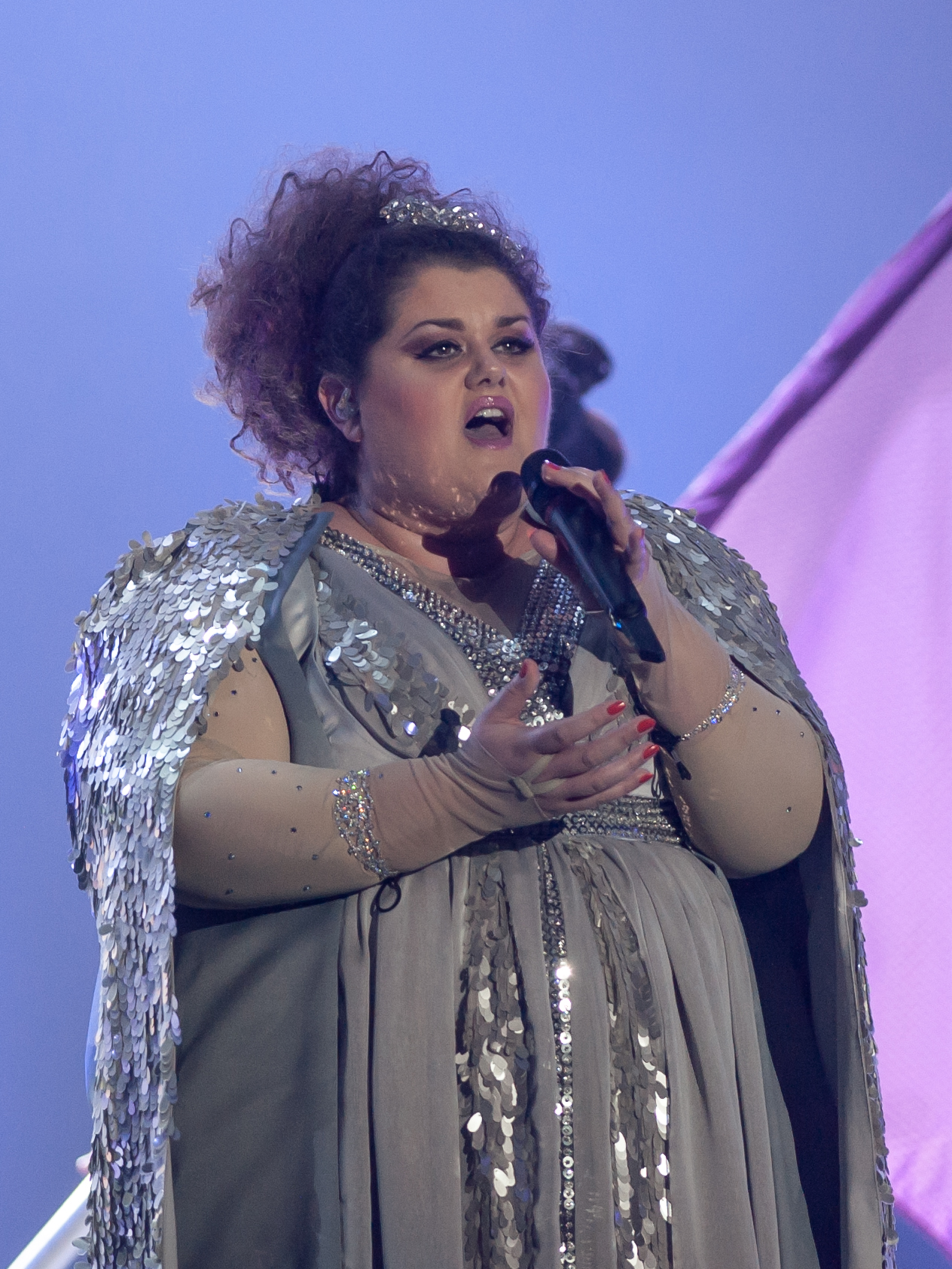
- Stamenov in 2015

Background information
- Born: 24 June 1986 (age 40); Belgrade, SR Serbia, SFR Yugoslavia
- Genres: Soul, jazz, R&B, funk, electropop
- Occupation: Singer
- Instruments: Vocals, guitar, lute
- Years active: 2009-present

Bojana Stamenov (Serbian Cyrillic: Бојана Стаменов, pronounced [bǒjana staměnoʋ]; born 24 June 1986) is a Serbian singer and musician best known for performing soul, jazz and R&B music, who represented Serbia, placing 10th in the Eurovision Song Contest 2015 with the song "Beauty Never Lies". She also participates in performances for children in the Boško Buha Theatre in Belgrade. Stamenov had her first concert on 13 June, in Sava Centar in Belgrade, while working on her debut album. The singer has announced that all the records will be in English.

== Ja imam talenat! ==
In 2012, Stamenov performed as a contestant in the third season of the show Ja imam talenat!, the Serbian version of Got Talent.

During the show, she sang three songs:

- Chaka Khan — "I Feel for You"
- James Brown — "It's a Man's Man's Man's World"
- Aretha Franklin — "Think"

== Discography ==
=== Singles ===
==== As lead artist ====
Title	Year	Peak chart positions			Album
Title	Year	AUT	BEL (FL)	ICE	Album
"Ceo svet je moj / Beauty Never Lies"	2015	55	88	28	Non-album single

==== As featured artist ====
Title	Year	Album
"Ludi i mladi" (Aleksa Jelić featuring Bojana Stamenov)	2011	Javna tajna
"I Feel Free " (Foam Fest Anthem 2012) (Deejay Playa featuring Bojana Stamenov)	2012	Non-album singles
"Spinnin' (Original Mix)" (Pookie featuring Bojana Stamenov)	2012	Non-album singles
"There's No Need to Be Shy" (Pookie featuring Bojana Stamenov)	2013	Non-album singles

== See also ==
- Serbia in the Eurovision Song Contest 2015

Awards and achievements
Preceded by Moje 3 with "Ljubav je svuda"	Serbia in the Eurovision Song Contest; 2015	Succeeded by Sanja Vučić with "Goodbye"
