= Marko Kon =

Serbian musician

Marko Kon Марко Кон
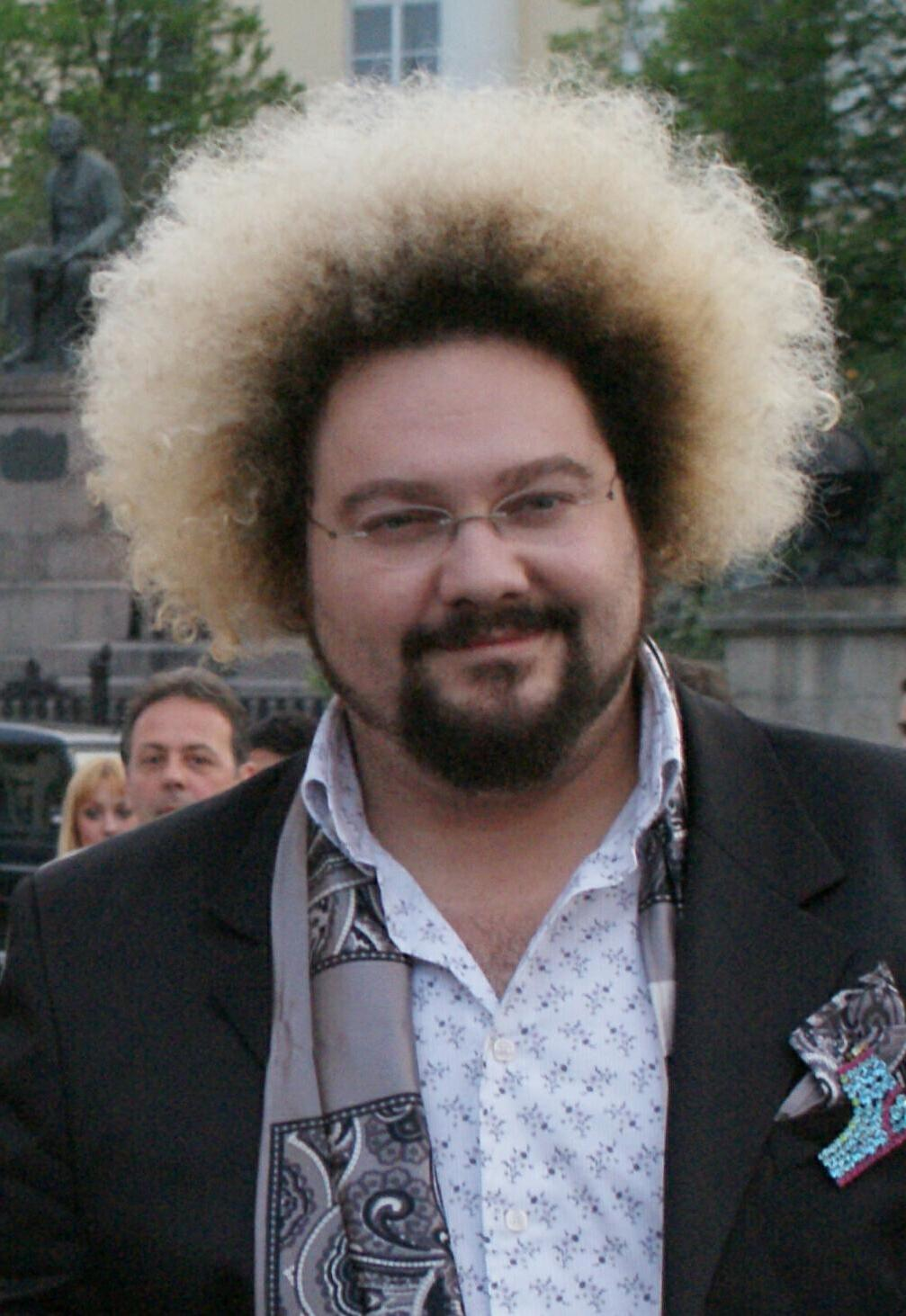
- Marko Kon in 2009

Background information
- Born: 20 April 1972 (age 54); Belgrade, SR Serbia, Yugoslavia
- Genres: Pop
- Occupation: Singer

Marko "Mare" Kon (Serbian Cyrillic: Марко Кон; born 20 April 1972) is a Serbian recording artist.

He was the Serbian entry for the Eurovision Song Contest 2009 alongside Milan Nikolić, but they did not manage to qualify for the finals.

== Early life ==
Kon was born to a Serbian-Jewish father and a Serbian mother.

== Career ==
As a vocalist, Kon has recorded three solo albums and contributed vocals to recordings of over thirty artists, including Dalibor Andonov Gru, Maja Nikolić, Mira Škorić, Goga Sekulić, Sky Wikluh, Jelena Tomašević, Aleksandra Radović, Boban Rajović, Reni, and Aleksa Vukašinović. His work as an arranger includes collaborations with over fifty artists, notably Dara Bubamara, Nikola Bulatović, Enes Ukić, Louis, Flamingosi, Lejla Hot, Djogani, and the Fantastic Band. Kon considers his collaboration with the rapper Gru on his 1995 album as his "big breakthrough" in the industry.

=== Eurovision Song Contest 2009 ===
In 2009, Kon collaborated with Milan Nikolić to perform "Cipela" at the Eurovision Song Contest 2009. The song was chosen after a national final. It competed in the second semi-final but failed to reach the final.

Awards and achievements
Preceded by Jelena Tomašević with Oro	Serbia in the Eurovision Song Contest (with Milaan); 2009	Succeeded by Milan Stanković with Ovo je Balkan
Preceded by Jelena Tomašević	Beovizija winner 2009	Succeeded by Sanja Ilić & Balkanika
