= Garavi Sokak =

Serbian folk rock/pop band

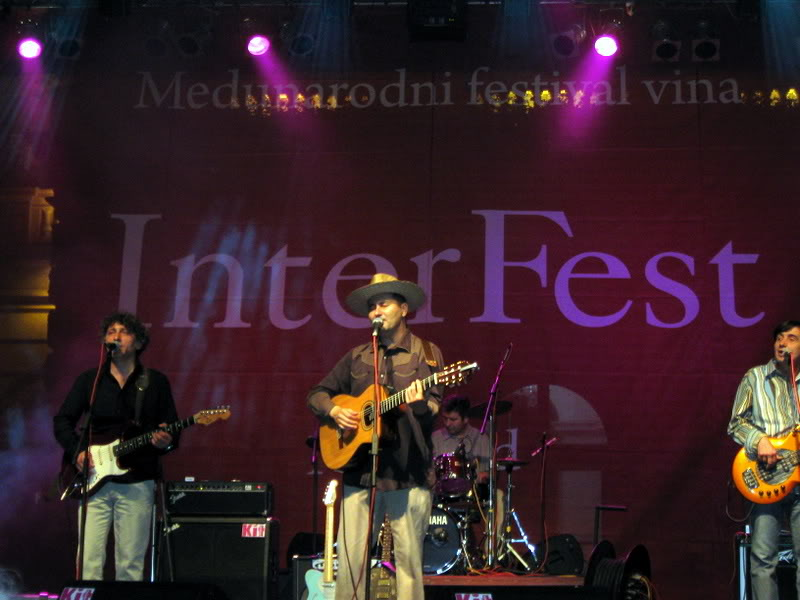
- Garavi Sokak performing live at the Wine Festival in Novi Sad in 2009

Background information
- Origin: Novi Sad, Vojvodina, Serbia
- Genres: Pop rock; folk rock; chanson; skiffle; pop
- Years active: 1987–present
- Labels: Udruženje rock muzičara Vojvodine, Panonija koncert, Jugoton, PGP-RTS, Vojvodina Music
- Members: Bane Krstić; Boban Dževerdanović; Milan Trifunović; Dragan Tasić; Ervin Malina; Siniša Blanuša
- Past members: Zoran Alvirović; Šeri Toplica; Slobodan Trkulja; Zoran Brajović; Nikola Oršoš; Miroslav Ilić; Đorđe Urban; Suad Saračević; Miroslav Papić; Senad Jašarević; Petar Alvirović
- Website: garavisokak.com

Garavi Sokak (Serbian Cyrillic: Гарави Сокак, trans. Sooty Alley) is a Serbian folk rock/pop band from Novi Sad.

== Band history ==
=== 1980s ===
The history of Garavi Sokak begins in 1980, when Bane Krstić (vocals, acoustic guitar), Petar Alvirović (bass guitar), Milan Trifunović (drums) and Šeri Toplica (rhythm guitar) formed the band Pa Šta! (So What!). Initially influenced by The Beatles and Bijelo Dugme, Pa Šta! performed at school dances across Vojvodina region.

In 1986 they released the single with songs "Sećaš se" ("You Remember") and "Bejbi" ("Baby") under the new name, Seks (Sex). The single was released through the Association of Rock Musicians of Vojvodina. In 1987, under the influence of Krstić's religious parents, they changed the name to Garavi Sokak. They chose the new name after the book of poems by Miroslav Antić. They rereleased the songs from their first single under different titles, "Solunska" ("Salonican Song") and "67. bejbi", and started working on their debut album.

The album Garavi Sokak was released in 1988. It was produced by Saša Habić and released through Panonija koncert on audio cassette only. At the time of the album release they were joined by guitarist Zoran "Kina" Alvirović. In 1989, the band released another self-titled album through Jugoton, considering it their first official album. The album was produced by Gabor Lenđel. It had success with the audience, bringing folk rock hits "Skeledžijo" ("(Hey,) Ferryman"), "Teci, teci, Dunave" ("Flow, Flow, Danube") and "Mađarica" ("Hungarian Girl").

=== 1990s ===
The band's following album, Garavi Sokak 2, released in 1990 through Jugoton, featured similar folk rock sound as the band's previous works. It brought hits "Ti si mene caknula" ("You Snicked Me"), "Neko, neko ko je daleko" ("Someone, Someone, Who Is Far Away") and "Na temerinskom vašaru" ("On Temerin Trade Fair"). In 1991, the band appeared at MESAM festival with the song "Pozdrav iz Soko Banje" ("Gretings from Soko Banja"), which was released on the 7-inch single, the B-side of which featured their cover of the song "Džudi, Džudi" by 1960s beat band Crni Biseri. During the same year, the compilation album Najlepše pesme (Prettiest Songs) was released through PGP-RTB record label.

In 1992 the band released the album Da se vrate srećni dani (May the Happy Days Return). The album was produced by Ivica Vlatković, and featured numerous guests: Marija Mihajlović (vocals), Slobodan "Bata" Božanić (bass guitar), Deže Molnar of Laboratorija Zvuka (saxophone), and others. The album cover featured a painting by Serbian naive art painter Sava Stojkov. The album's main hits were "Kao ja" ("Just As I Did"), "Reci zašto" ("Tell Me Why"), "Zima, leto..." ("Winter, Summer...") and a new version of "Solunska".

In 1994 the band released the studio album Slova tvoga imena (Letters of Your Name) in the new lineup: Bane Krstić (vocal, acoustic guitar), Zoran Brajović (drums), Nikola Oršoš (bass guitar), Miroslav Ilić (accordion, prim), Šeri Toplica (acoustic guitar), Slobodan Trkulja (bagpipes, flute, clarinet, saxophone) and Milan Trifunović (percussion). The album, produced by alternative rock musician Rambo Amadeus, marked the band's shift towards acoustic sound, and brought hits "Biće bolje ako budeš tu" ("It Will Be Better If You Stay By Me"), "U Perlezu stao voz" ("A Train Stopped in Perlez") and "Plavi svitac" ("Blue Firefly"). After the album was released the band started performing with acoustic instruments only.

The album Dobro je (It's All Right), released in 1996 by PGP-RTS (and being one of the last albums released on vinyl record by that label), featured a cover of The Beatles song "Good Night", Garavi Sokak version entitled "Laku noć ti, ljubavi" ("Good Night, My Love"). The recording of their unplugged performance, held in Novi Sad Studio M in November 1996, was released on the album Najveći hitovi – Unplugged (Greatest Hits – Unplugged). In 1998, the band released the album Sagradićemo brod (We'll Build a Boat), which featured similar acoustic folk-oriented sound as their several previous releases.

=== 2000s ===
The album Doviđenja tugo (Goodbye, Sadness), released in 2001, featured the song "Ruska" ("Russian Song"), inspired by the music of Alla Pugacheva, and a country version of their old song "Za mene kasno je već" ("It's too Late for Me") with a new title, "Tragovi tvojih točkova" ("Traces of Your Wheels"). At the time of the album release the band consisted of Krstić, Milan Trifunović, Miroslav Ilić, Boban Dževerdanović (guitar), Đorđe Urban (bass guitar), Suad Saračević (keyboards) and Miroslav Papić (drums).

In 2003, Krstić formed the record label Vojvodina Music, through which the band released the album Svako ima nekog koga više nema (Everybody Has Someone Who He Doesn't Have Anymore). The album was produced by Zoran Maletić, and was more pop-oriented than the band's previous releases. The album's main hit, "Ko te ima taj te nema" was recorded in three versions: beside the one featured on the album, the band recorded another one with folk singer Zvonko Bogdan, and the third one, sung by Zvonko Bogdan followed by a tamburica orchestra, was released on the compilation album Ko te ima taj te nema in 2006. In 2008, the band released their tenth studio album entitled Ja bih za tebe dao sve (I Would Give Everything for You). The album was co-released by PGP-RTS and Krstić's Vojvodina Music.

=== 2010s ===
In 2014 Garavi Sokak released their latest studio album, Zrnce ljubavi (Grain of Love). The album was produced by Krstić.

== Legacy ==
The band's song "Ko te ima taj te nema" was covered by numerous artists. Beside Zvonko Bogdan, who included the song into his own repertoire, the song was recorded by Serbian folk singer Dragan Kojić "Keba" in 2006, and Yugoslav singer-songwriter Branimir "Džoni" Štulić in 2013, among others.

Garavi Sokak's song "Svako ima nekog koga više nema" was covered by Yugoslavian and Croatian pop rock band Srebrna Krila in 2012.

== Discography ==
=== Studio albums ===
- Garavi Sokak (1988)
- Garavi Sokak (1989)
- Garavi Sokak II (1990)
- Da se vrate srećni dani (1992)
- Slova tvoga imena (1994)
- Dobro je (1996)
- Sagradićemo brod (1998)
- Doviđenja tugo (2001)
- Svako ima nekog koga više nema (2004)
- Ja bih za tebe dao sve (2008)
- Zrnce Ljubavi (2014)

=== Live albums ===
- Najveći hitovi – Unplugged (1996)
- Acoustic – najveći hitovi (LIVE) (2008)
- Opening of an ATM in Karavukovo (unplugged)

=== Compilations ===
- Najlepše pesme (1991)
- Najlepše pesme – The Best of (2002)
- Ko te ima taj te nema (2006)

=== Singles ===
- "Sećaš li se" / "Bejbi" (as Seks, 1986)
- "67. bejbi" / "Solunska" (1988)
- "Pozdrav iz Soko Banje" / "Džudi, Džudi" (1991)
