= Milan Nikolić (musician) =

Serbian accordionist

Milan Nikolić Милан Николић
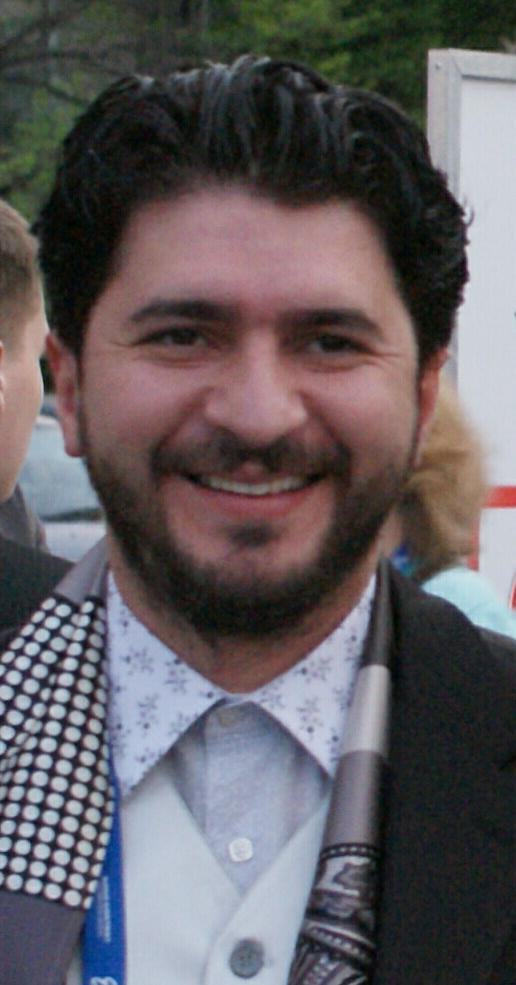
- Nikolić in 2009

Background information
- Born: 2 July 1979 (age 46); Jagodina, SR Serbia, SFR Yugoslavia
- Occupation(s): Musician, songwriter
- Instrument(s): Vocals, accordion

Milan Nikolić (Serbian Cyrillic: Милан Николић; born 2 July 1979), also known professionally as Milaan, is a Serbian accordionist who was the Serbian entry for the Eurovision Song Contest 2009 with Marko Kon. The song "Cipela" was chosen to represent Serbia in the 2009 national final of the Eurovision Song Contest. It competed in the second semi final but failed to reach the final.

Awards and achievements
Preceded by Jelena Tomašević with Oro	Serbia in the Eurovision Song Contest (with Marko Kon); 2009	Succeeded by Milan Stanković with Ovo je Balkan
Preceded by Jelena Tomašević	Beovizija winner 2009	Succeeded by Sanja Ilić & Balkanika
