= Ireland in the Eurovision Song Contest 2016 =

- Eurovision Song Contest 2016
- Participating broadcaster: Raidió Teilifís Éireann (RTÉ)
- Country: Ireland
- Selection process: Internal selection
- Announcement date: 13 January 2016

Competing entry
- Song: "Sunlight"
- Artist: Nicky Byrne
- Songwriters: Nicky Byrne; Wayne Hector; Ronan Hardiman

Placement
- Semi-final result: Failed to qualify (15th)

Participation chronology

Ireland was represented at the Eurovision Song Contest 2016 with the song "Sunlight", written by Nicky Byrne, Wayne Hector, and Ronan Hardiman, and performed by Byrne himself. The Irish participating broadcaster, Raidió Teilifís Éireann (RTÉ), internally selected its entry for the contest. "Sunlight" was presented as the Irish entry during the announcement of Byrne's internal selection on 13 January 2016.

Ireland was drawn to compete in the second semi-final of the Eurovision Song Contest which took place on 12 May 2016. Performing during the show in position 7, "Sunlight" was not announced among the top 10 entries of the second semi-final and therefore did not qualify to compete in the final. It was later revealed that Ireland placed fifteenth out of the 18 participating countries in the semi-final with 46 points.

== Background ==
Prior to the 2016 contest, Raidió Teilifís Éireann (RTÉ) and its predecessor national broadcasters have participated in the Eurovision Song Contest representing Ireland forty-nine times since RÉ's first entry in 1965. They have won the contest a record seven times in total. Their first win came in 1970, with "All Kinds of Everything" performed by Dana. Ireland holds the record for being the only country to win the contest three times in a row (in 1992, 1993, and 1994), as well as having the only three-time winner (Johnny Logan, who won in 1980 as a singer, 1987 as a singer-songwriter, and again in 1992 as a songwriter). The Irish entries in 2014, "Heartbeat" performed by Can-linn featuring Kasey Smith, and in 2015, "Playing with Numbers" performed by Molly Sterling, both failed to qualify to the final.

As part of its duties as participating broadcaster, RTÉ organises the selection of its entry in the Eurovision Song Contest and broadcasts the event in the country. The broadcaster confirmed its intentions to participate at the 2016 contest on 27 May 2015. From 2008 to 2015, RTÉ had set up the national final Eurosong to choose both the song and performer to compete at Eurovision for Ireland, with both the public and regional jury groups involved in the selection. For the 2016 contest, RTÉ held an internal selection to choose the artist and song. This marked the first time that RTÉ internally selected both the artist and song for the contest; previously the broadcaster had only internally selected the artist in 1974, 1975, 2006, and 2007, while the song was chosen in a televised competition. In regards to the 2016 internal selection, RTÉ Head of Entertainment John McHugh stated: "We have a long and proud history with Eurovision, but we've had mixed results over the last few years. Myself and Head of Delegation Michael Kealy took a serious look at our approach, reviewing the entire process and the Eurovision Song Contest itself. The competition is constantly evolving and RTÉ has to be flexible in how we approach it in order to put our best foot forward. Direct selection has proven to be a successful method for other countries and we felt that this year it would give us the best chance at success."

== Before Eurovision ==
=== Selection procedure ===
On 13 January 2016, RTÉ announced that they had internally selected Nicky Byrne to represent Ireland in the Eurovision Song Contest 2016. Byrne was a former member of the Irish boy band Westlife and had previously been the Irish spokesperson at the Eurovision Song Contest, revealing the results of the Irish vote between 2013 and 2015. Unconfirmed rumours of Byrne's selection as the Irish contestant were published by Irish media earlier on 7 January 2016.

Along with the announcement that Byrne would represent Ireland on 13 January 2016, the song to be performed by Byrne, "Sunlight", was also released via a lyric video uploaded on YouTube. The song was written by Byrne himself together with Wayne Hector and Ronan Hardiman. Byrne's first live performance of the song took place on 13 February, during the RTÉ One Saturday night programme The Ray D'Arcy Show.

The song is called Sunlight and I co-wrote it with two of the music industry's legends; producer and writer Ronan Hardiman and songwriter Wayne Hector. I have always felt this song had something different, something special. I also look forward to re-visiting Sweden, a country where we had so much success with Westlife over the years and I can't wait to be a part of what I'm sure will be an amazing show in Stockholm. Ireland, I will give it my best shot. Sweden… here we come!

— Nicky Byrne

=== Promotion ===
Nicky Byrne made several appearances across Europe to specifically promote "Sunlight" as the Irish Eurovision entry. On 21 February 2016, Nicky Byrne performed "Sunlight" during the final of the Ukrainian Eurovision national selection. On 17 April, Byrne performed during the London Eurovision Party, which was held at the Café de Paris venue in London, United Kingdom and hosted by Nicki French and Paddy O'Connell. In late April, Byrne completed promotional activities in the United Kingdom where he appeared on radio programmes and talk shows to promote both his Eurovision song and the release of his album Sunlight.

In addition to his international appearances, Nicky Byrne also completed promotional appearances on RTÉ One programmes in Ireland. Byrne performed "Sunlight" during the final of The Voice of Ireland on 24 April and he gave an interview about his preparations for the Eurovision Song Contest on The Ray D'Arcy Show on 30 April.

== At Eurovision ==
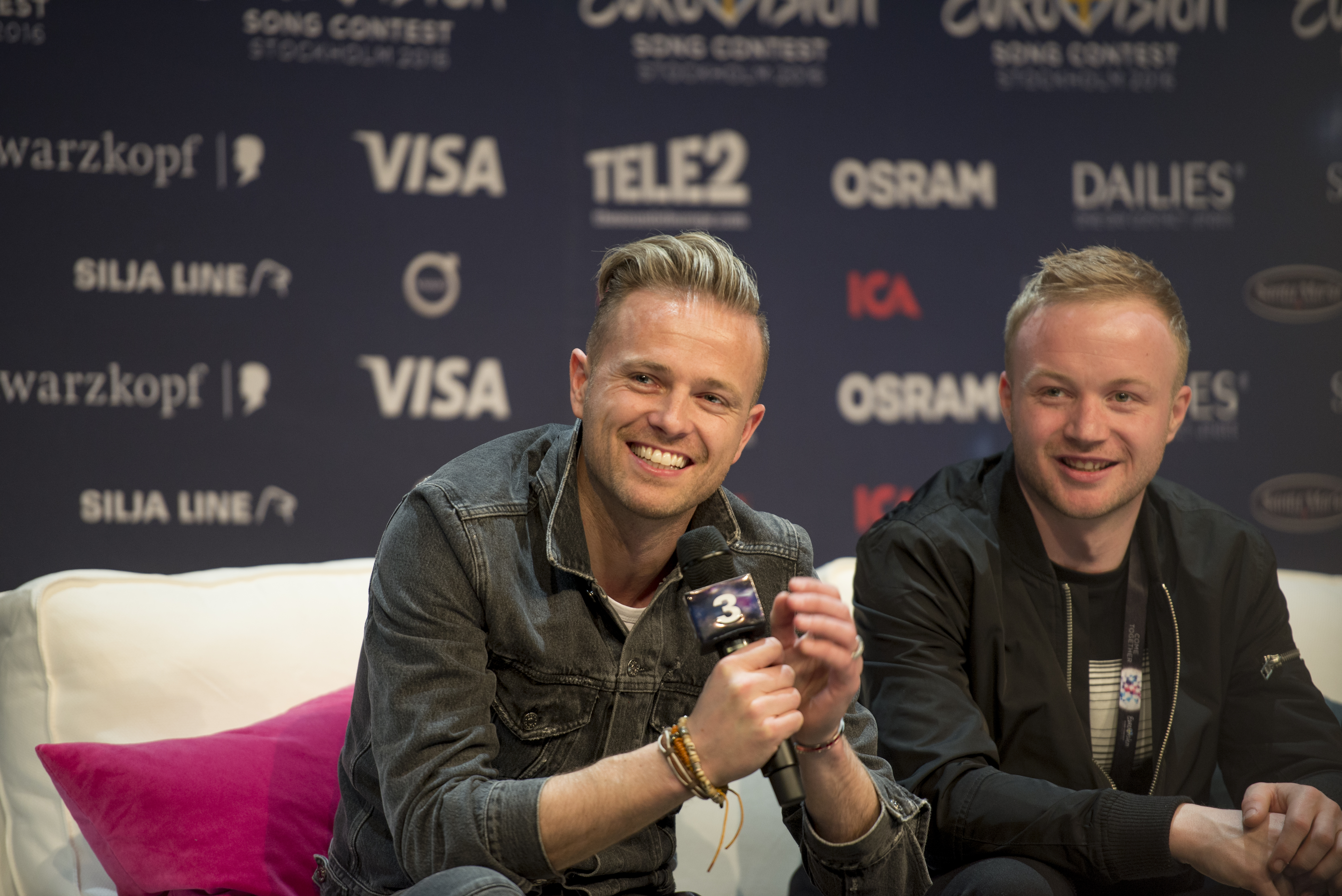
Nicky Byrne during a press meet and greet

According to Eurovision rules, all nations with the exceptions of the host country and the "Big Five" (France, Germany, Italy, Spain and the United Kingdom) are required to qualify from one of two semi-finals in order to compete for the final; the top ten countries from each semi-final progress to the final. The European Broadcasting Union (EBU) split up the competing countries into six different pots based on voting patterns from previous contests, with countries with favourable voting histories put into the same pot. On 25 January 2016, a special allocation draw was held which placed each country into one of the two semi-finals, as well as which half of the show they would perform in. Ireland was placed into the second semi-final, to be held on 12 May 2016, and was scheduled to perform in the first half of the show.

Once all the competing songs for the 2016 contest had been released, the running order for the semi-finals was decided by the shows' producers rather than through another draw, so that similar songs were not placed next to each other. Ireland was set to perform in position 7, following the entry from Serbia and before the entry from Macedonia.

In Ireland, the two semi-finals were broadcast on RTÉ2 and the final was broadcast on RTÉ One with all three shows featuring commentary by Marty Whelan. The second semi-final and the final were also broadcast via radio on RTÉ Radio 1 with commentary by Neil Doherty and Zbyszek Zalinski. The Irish spokesperson, who announced the top 12-point score awarded by the Irish jury during the final, was Sinéad Kennedy.

=== Semi-final ===
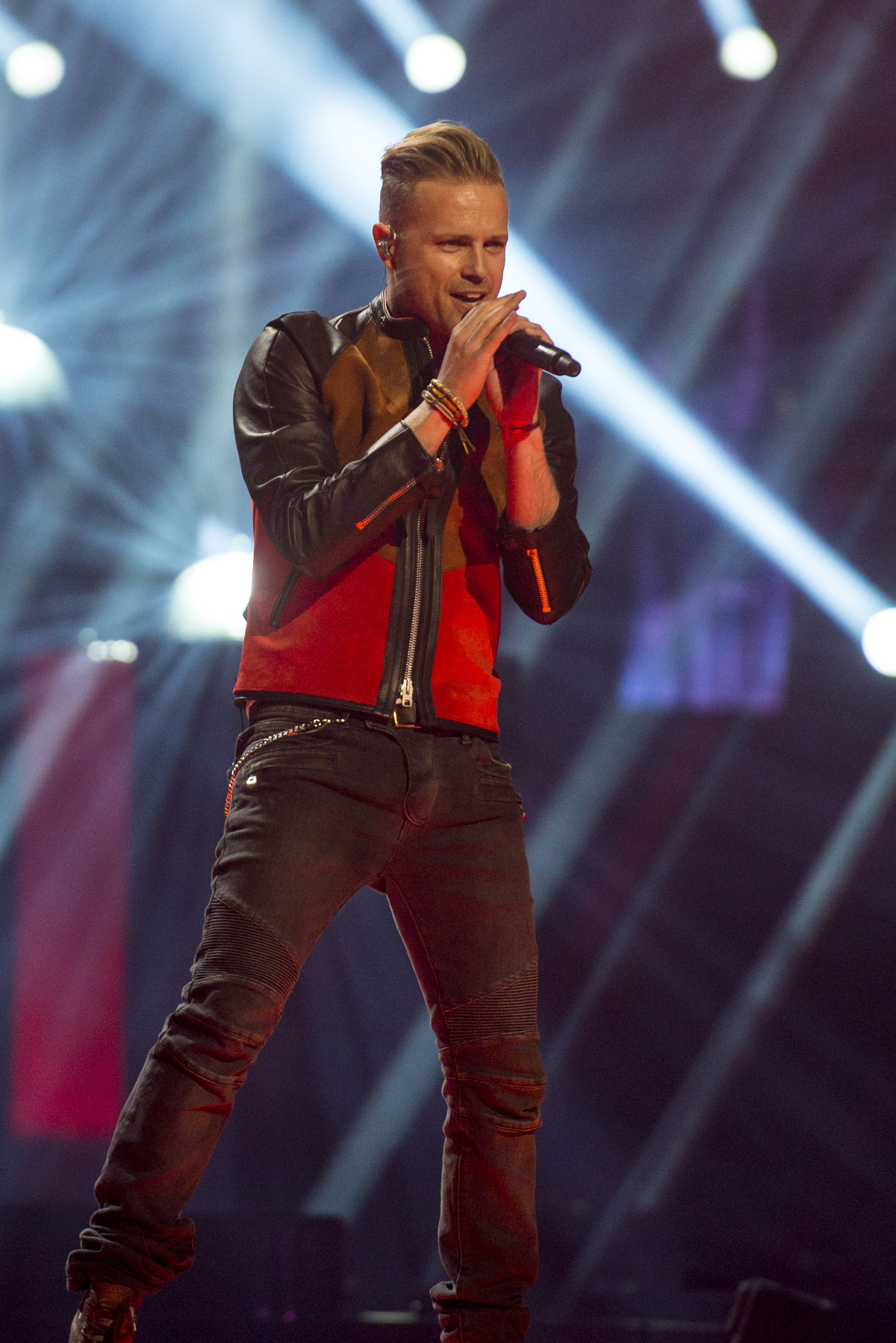
Nicky Byrne during a rehearsal before the second semi-final

Nicky Byrne took part in technical rehearsals on 4 and 7 May, followed by dress rehearsals on 11 and 12 May. This included the jury show on 11 May where the professional juries of each country watched and voted on the competing entries.

The Irish performance featured a band set-up with Nicky Byrne performing together with a drummer, keyboard player and guitarist who were on raised platforms. The LED screens displayed bright red patterns and fireball images of the sun with the stage lighting in red and white. The creative team that worked on producing Ireland's performance was led by Tim Byrne, former Creative Director of Syco Entertainment at Sony Music and included Lee Lodge, whose production credits include the 87th Academy Awards and the MTV Music Video Awards, and Michael Kealy, the Irish Head of Delegation for the Eurovision Song Contest. Byrne was joined on stage by five backing vocalists, some of which were also playing instruments: Janet Grogan, Jay Boland, Ian White, Jennifer Healy and Johan Sundvall.

At the end of the show, Ireland was not announced among the top 10 entries in the second semi-final and therefore failed to qualify to compete in the final. It was later revealed that Ireland placed fifteenth in the semi-final, receiving a total of 46 points: 31 points from the televoting and 15 points from the juries.

=== Voting ===
Voting during the three shows was conducted under a new system that involved each country now awarding two sets of points from 1–8, 10 and 12: one from their professional jury and the other from televoting. Each nation's jury consisted of five music industry professionals who are citizens of the country they represent, with their names published before the contest to ensure transparency. This jury judged each entry based on: vocal capacity; the stage performance; the song's composition and originality; and the overall impression by the act. In addition, no member of a national jury was permitted to be related in any way to any of the competing acts in such a way that they cannot vote impartially and independently. The individual rankings of each jury member as well as the nation's televoting results were released shortly after the grand final.

Below is a breakdown of points awarded to Ireland and awarded by Ireland in the second semi-final and grand final of the contest, and the breakdown of the jury voting and televoting conducted during the two shows:

==== Points awarded to Ireland ====
Points awarded to Ireland (Semi-final 2)
Score	Televote	Jury
12 points		
10 points		
8 points		
7 points	Australia; United Kingdom	
6 points		
5 points		
4 points	Belgium; Denmark	Denmark
3 points		Norway
2 points	Norway; Poland; Switzerland	Israel; Italy; Ukraine; United Kingdom
1 point	Israel; Latvia; Lithuania	

==== Points awarded by Ireland ====
Points awarded by Ireland (Semi-final 2)
Score	Televote	Jury
12 points	Lithuania	Belgium
10 points	Poland	Bulgaria
8 points	Australia	Slovenia
7 points	Latvia	Israel
6 points	Belgium	Australia
5 points	Bulgaria	Switzerland
4 points	Ukraine	Latvia
3 points	Denmark	Lithuania
2 points	Israel	Belarus
1 point	Belarus	Georgia

Points awarded by Ireland (Final)
Score	Televote	Jury
12 points	Lithuania	Belgium
10 points	Poland	Bulgaria
8 points	Russia	Netherlands
7 points	Latvia	United Kingdom
6 points	Australia	Italy
5 points	Bulgaria	Sweden
4 points	Ukraine	Israel
3 points	United Kingdom	France
2 points	Sweden	Czech Republic
1 point	Austria	Latvia

==== Detailed voting results ====
The following members comprised the Irish jury:

- Ken O'Sullivan (jury chairperson) – radio presenter
- Caroline Henry – music associate, production manager
- Lauren Murphy – freelance music and arts journalist, website music editor
- Jimmy Rainsford – musician
- Molly Sterling – singer, songwriter, represented Ireland in the 2015 contest

Detailed voting results from Ireland (Semi-final 2)
R/O	Country	Jury							Televote	
R/O	Country	K. O'Sullivan	C. Henry	L. Murphy	J. Rainsford	M. Sterling	Rank	Points	Rank	Points
01	Latvia	6	10	5	12	4	7	4	4	7
02	Poland	12	7	16	9	15	12		2	10
03	Switzerland	7	8	13	2	6	6	5	14	
04	Israel	1	3	6	16	5	4	7	9	2
05	Belarus	4	9	4	10	14	9	2	10	1
06	Serbia	5	5	14	14	13	11		15	
07	Ireland									
08	Macedonia	13	15	15	17	9	17		16	
09	Lithuania	8	11	10	3	8	8	3	1	12
10	Australia	16	6	3	8	1	5	6	3	8
11	Slovenia	3	2	8	4	12	3	8	13	
12	Bulgaria	10	4	7	5	2	2	10	6	5
13	Denmark	11	14	17	7	11	13		8	3
14	Ukraine	17	17	9	13	7	15		7	4
15	Norway	9	13	11	11	17	14		11	
16	Georgia	15	16	2	6	10	10	1	12	
17	Albania	14	12	12	15	16	16		17	
18	Belgium	2	1	1	1	3	1	12	5	6

Detailed voting results from Ireland (Final)
R/O	Country	Jury							Televote	
R/O	Country	K. O'Sullivan	C. Henry	L. Murphy	J. Rainsford	M. Sterling	Rank	Points	Rank	Points
01	Belgium	1	1	3	2	5	1	12	13	
02	Czech Republic	12	15	14	9	11	9	2	23	
03	Netherlands	3	3	1	4	16	3	8	14	
04	Azerbaijan	16	16	13	22	21	19		25	
05	Hungary	18	17	25	19	23	26		15	
06	Italy	5	2	20	5	7	5	6	16	
07	Israel	2	11	9	13	13	7	4	18	
08	Bulgaria	10	4	4	3	4	2	10	6	5
09	Sweden	22	5	12	7	2	6	5	9	2
10	Germany	26	14	15	24	10	21		20	
11	France	4	13	7	17	17	8	3	12	
12	Poland	24	12	26	16	20	24		2	10
13	Australia	23	22	2	8	8	12		5	6
14	Cyprus	19	8	18	11	25	17		17	
15	Serbia	9	9	19	20	18	16		26	
16	Lithuania	11	26	16	6	14	14		1	12
17	Croatia	17	19	10	21	22	20		24	
18	Russia	8	21	17	12	26	18		3	8
19	Spain	13	10	23	18	3	13		11	
20	Latvia	15	25	8	14	1	10	1	4	7
21	Ukraine	25	24	5	15	6	15		7	4
22	Malta	7	23	22	23	19	22		19	
23	Georgia	20	18	6	10	9	11		22	
24	Austria	21	6	24	26	24	25		10	1
25	United Kingdom	6	7	11	1	12	4	7	8	3
26	Armenia	14	20	21	25	15	23		21	
