= Molly Sterling =

Irish singer and songwriter (born 1998)

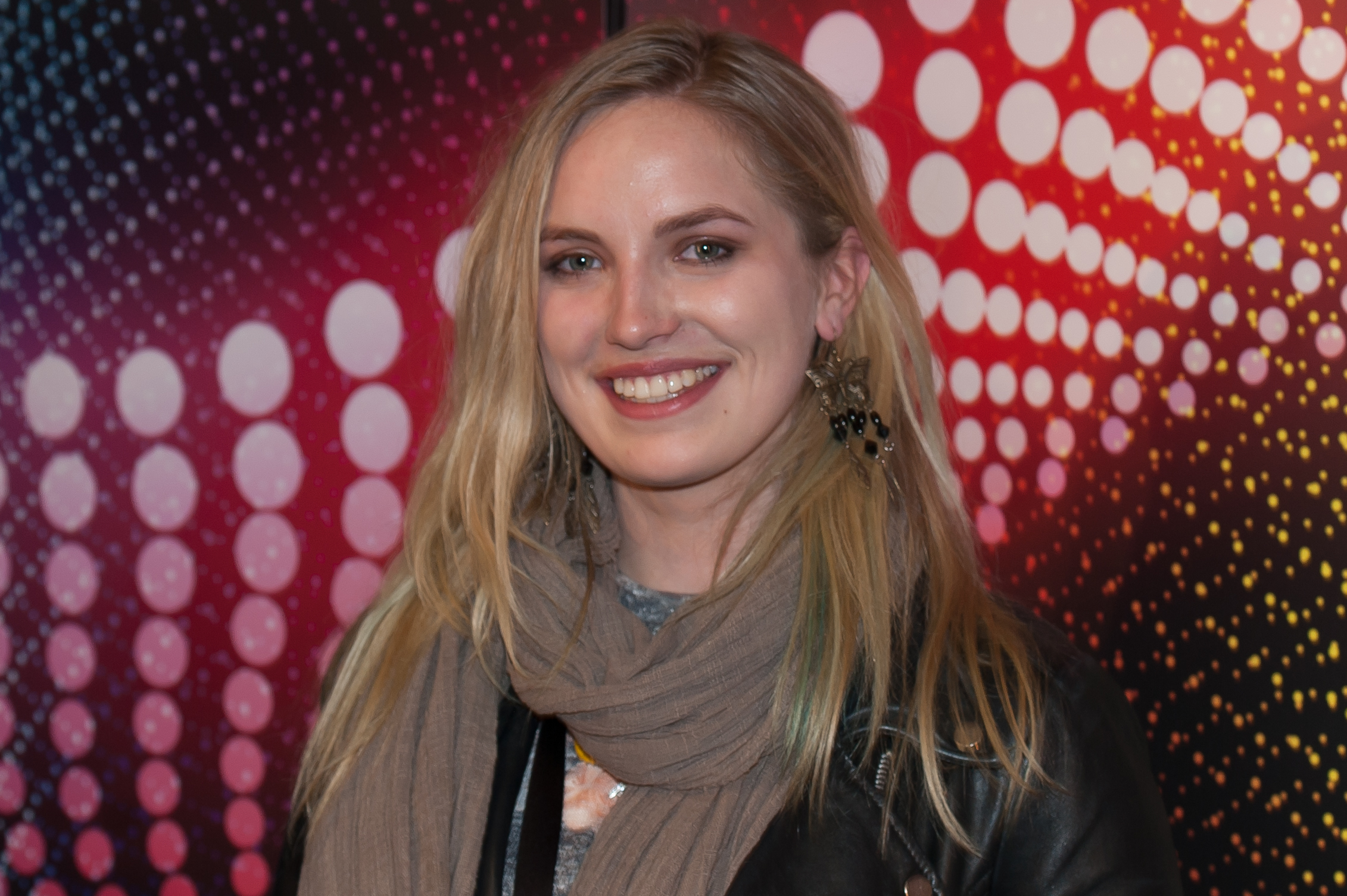
- Molly Sterling in 2015

Background information
- Born: 8 March 1998 (age 28); Puckane, County Tipperary, Ireland
- Genre: alternative
- Occupations: Singer; songwriter
- Instruments: Vocals; piano
- Years active: 2011–present
- Website: mollysterlingmusic.com

Molly Sterling (born 8 March 1998) is an Irish singer and songwriter who represented Ireland in the Eurovision Song Contest 2015 with the song "Playing with Numbers".

== Biography ==
Sterling grew up in Puckane, County Tipperary. They were educated at Kilkenny College and then at St. Andrew's College, Dublin.

== Career ==
=== 2011–14: Early beginnings ===
Molly Sterling first came to prominence after winning the Teen Idol contest in November 2011, winning a Popstar Studios recording prize. They won a second-place award for Girl's Vocal Solo at the 2012 Kilkenny Music Festival and supported Runaway GO at a gig in Nenagh Arts Centre on 9 June 2012. They finished second in TV3's All Ireland Schools' Talent Search in May 2014 and released her first EP, Strands of Heart, in November 2014.

=== 2015–present: Eurovision Song Contest ===
On 27 February 2015 they were selected to represent Ireland in the Eurovision Song Contest 2015 with the song "Playing with Numbers". They performed in the second semi-final, but missed out on qualification for the final. At 17 years old, they were the youngest ever entrant to perform for Ireland in their history of participation.

== Personal life ==
Sterling is non-binary and uses they/them pronouns.

== Discography ==
=== Extended plays ===
Title	Details
Strands of Heart	Released: November 2014; Format: Digital download

=== Singles ===
==== As lead artist ====
Title	Year	Peak chart positions	Album or EP
Title	Year	IRE	Album or EP
"Playing with Numbers"	2015	77	Non-album singles
"Fake the Cost"	2015	—	Non-album singles
"Plain Static"	2017	—	Non-album singles
"Stripped Down"	2018	—	Non-album singles
"Feeble"	2019	—	Non-album singles
"Strong Leech"	2024	—	Non-album singles
"—" denotes a recording that did not chart or was not released in that territory.

==== As featured artist ====
Title	Year	Album or EP
"Just My Luck" (Nealo featuring Molly Sterling and Innrspace)	2019	Non-album single
"Let Your Dreams Collect Dust Until You're Desperate" (Nealo featuring Adam Garrett, Molly Sterling, and Jehnova)	2020	All the Leaves Are Falling
"All the Leaves Are Falling" (Nealo featuring Molly Sterling)	2020	All the Leaves Are Falling

== See also ==
- Ireland in the Eurovision Song Contest 2015

Awards and achievements
Preceded by Can-linn feat. Kasey Smith with "Heartbeat"	Ireland in the Eurovision Song Contest; 2015	Succeeded by Nicky Byrne with "Sunlight"
