= Ben Greenhalgh =

English footballer & golfer (born 1992)

Personal information
- Date of birth: 16 April 1992 (age 34)
- Place of birth: Orpington, England
- Positions: Midfielder; striker

Team information
- Current team: Dartford (player/manager)
- Number: 11

Senior career*
Years	Team	Apps	(Gls)
2009–2010	Welling United	1	(0)
2010–2011	Inter Milan	0	(0)
2010	→ Como (loan)	12	(8)
2012	Welling United	16	(3)
2012–2013	Ebbsfleet United	10	(1)
2013	Maidstone United	3	(0)
2013	Concord Rangers	11	(5)
2013–2014	Inverness Caledonian Thistle	6	(0)
2014	→ Stenhousemuir (loan)	6	(3)
2014–2015	Maidstone United	46	(10)
2015–2016	Concord Rangers	42	(13)
2016–2017	Maidstone United	21	(2)
2017	→ Hemel Hempstead Town (loan)	18	(4)
2017	Hemel Hempstead Town	11	(4)
2017–2018	Concord Rangers	27	(8)
2018–2020	Dartford	54	(7)
2019–2020	→ Tonbridge Angels (loan)	8	(1)
2020–2021	Tonbridge Angels	18	(2)
2021–2026	Margate	204	(76)
2026–	Dartford	18	(7)

Managerial career
- 2022–2023: Margate (joint-caretaker)
- 2024–2026: Margate (player-manager)
- 2026–: Dartford (player-manager)
- * Club domestic league appearances and goals as of 17:10, 21 November 2026 (UTC)

Benjamin James Greenhalgh (born 16 April 1992) is an English football manager who is currently the player-manager of Dartford.

He is noted for winning the football reality show Football's Next Star, where he won a contract at Italian giants Inter Milan and is also a golfer.

== Career ==
=== Football's Next Star ===
Greenhalgh, from Orpington, who played for the Welling United youth team, was featured in the Sky One show Football's Next Star and impressed judges in the trial game after laying on a perfect cross for Hicham Abdellah to head home. At the end of the opening episode, the judges presented the Inter Milan shirt to ten players who would travel to Italy to compete for their dream of a professional contract in later episodes.

After 20,000 entries to the show and eight episodes, Greenhalgh was given the shirt and revealed as the winner of Football's Next Star 2010, receiving a professional six-month contract with Inter Milan.

=== Back in the United Kingdom ===
After his six-month professional contract at Inter Milan came to an end, Greenhalgh was offered another year from the Italian giants which included a four-month loan spell to Calcio Como, where he scored eight goals from 12 games. Despite never playing a senior game during his time with Inter Milan, Greenhalgh was presented with a Champions League winners medal after being part of the travelling squad for the 2010 UEFA Champions League Final. After his contract was up, he returned to the UK and spent time at Brighton & Hove Albion, as well as a spell at Birmingham City, where he was advised to play first team football in the Conference to gain experience in the English game. He signed for non-League club Welling United in December, before later joining Ebbsfleet United and Maidstone United.

In June 2013 he transferred to Scottish club Inverness Caledonian Thistle. This was due to happen in February 2013, however international clearance stopped Greenhalgh from leaving England until the 2013–14 season. Having played only six first-team games for Inverness, Greenhalgh was loaned to Scottish League One club Stenhousemuir for the final six games of the season. In June 2014 it was reported that Inverness had opted not to offer Greenhalgh a further contract, with manager John Hughes stating that he could not guarantee Greenhalgh first-team football.

It was announced on 22 June 2015, that Greenhalgh had signed for National League South side Concord Rangers, returning to a club where he had made a big impact during the run-in of the 2012–13 season, winning both the Isthmian League Cup, and the Isthmian League Premier Division play-offs.

On 26 May 2016, Greenhalgh had signed for Maidstone United again. He was released by Maidstone a year later in May 2017. He was immediately signed by National League South side Hemel Hempstead Town, who had Greenhalgh on loan towards the back end of the 2016–17 season.

On 24 May 2018, Greenhalgh had signed for Dartford.

On 8 November 2019, Greenhalgh had signed for Tonbridge Angels on an initial month's loan. His loan was then extended until 4 January 2020. On 7 January 2020, he left Dartford by mutual consent. The following day, Greenhalgh signed permanently for Tonbridge Angels.

On 6 April 2021, Greenhalgh signed for Margate for the 2021–22 season. Greenhalgh was appointed captain ahead of the 2022–23 season. In December 2022, the sacking of Andy Drury saw Greenhalgh appointed joint-caretaker manager with fellow player Reece Prestedge. On 31 January 2023, Prestedge was appointed manager on a permanent basis with Greenhalgh as his assistant manager. Following relegation at the end of the 2023–24 season, Greenhalgh was named player-manager.

On 7 May 2026, Greenhalgh returned to Dartford as first-team manager.

== Personal life ==
In 2015 he became a professional golfer and joined the PGA circuit, playing in one-day golf tournaments while continuing to play semi-professional football.

== Career statistics ==
As of match played 21 November 2026

Appearances and goals by club, season and competition
Club	Season	League			National Cup		League Cup		Other		Total	
Club	Season	Division	Apps	Goals	Apps	Goals	Apps	Goals	Apps	Goals	Apps	Goals
Welling United	2009–10	Conference South	1	0	0	0	—		0	0	1	0
Inter Milan	2010–11	Serie A	0	0	0	0	—		0	0	0	0
Como (loan)	2010–11	Lega Pro Prima Divisione Group A	12	8	0	0	—		—		12	8
Welling United	2011–12	Conference South	16	3	—		—		0	0	16	3
Ebbsfleet United	2012–13	Conference Premier	10	1	1	0	—		1 (Note: Appearance(s) in FA Trophy)	0	12	1
Maidstone United	2012–13	Isthmian League Division One South	3	0	—		—		—		3	0
Concord Rangers	2012–13	Isthmian League Premier Division	11	5	—		—		—		11	5
Inverness Caledonian Thistle	2013–14	Scottish Premiership	6	0	0	0	0	0	—		6	0
Stenhousemuir (loan)	2013–14	Scottish League One	6	3	—		—		—		6	3
Maidstone United	2014–15	Isthmian League Premier Division	46	10	5	3	—		4 (Note: Two appearances in FA Trophy, two appearances and one goal in Alan Turvey Trophy)	1	55	14
Concord Rangers	2015–16	National League South	42	13	1	0	—		2	1	45	14
Maidstone United	2016–17	National League	21	2	2	0	—		2	1	25	3
Hemel Hempstead Town (loan)	2016–17	National League South	18	4	—		—		—		18	4
Hemel Hempstead Town	2017–18	National League South	11	4	2	0	—		0	0	13	4
Concord Rangers	2017–18	National League South	27	8	—		—		1	0	28	8
Dartford	2018–19	National League South	42	4	2	0	—		3 (Note: Appearance(s) in Kent Senior Cup)	0	47	4
Dartford	2019–20	National League South	12	3	3	0	—		0	0	15	3
Dartford	Dartford total		54	7	5	0	0	0	3	0	62	7
Tonbridge Angels (loan)	2019–20	National League South	8	1	—		—		—		8	1
Tonbridge Angels	2019–20	National League South	7	1	—		—		—		7	1
Tonbridge Angels	2020–21	National League South	11	1	4	2	—		1	0	16	3
Tonbridge Angels	Tonbridge Angels total		26	3	4	2	0	0	1	0	31	5
Margate	2021–22	Isthmian League Premier Division	42	18	3	0	—		10 (Note: Appearance(s) in Velocity Trophy)	6	55	24
Margate	2022–23	Isthmian League Premier Division	42	12	2	0	—		8 (Note: Appearance(s) in Velocity Cup)	5	52	17
Margate	2023–24	Isthmian League Premier Division	39	14	4	1	—		2	0	45	15
Margate	2024–25	Isthmian League South East Division	41	10	6	4	—		7 (Note: Appearance(s) in Isthmian League South East Division play-offs)	3	54	17
Margate	2025–26	Isthmian League South East Division	40	22	2	0	—		5	0	47	22
Margate	Margate total		204	76	17	5	0	0	32	14	253	95
Dartford	2026–27	Isthmian League Premier Division	18	7	4	1	—		3	1	25	9
Career total			532	154	41	11	0	0	49	18	622	183

== Managerial statistics ==
As of match played 21 November 2026

Managerial record by team and tenure
Team	From	To	Record				
Team	From	To	P	W	D	L	Win %
Margate (joint-caretaker)	26 December 2022	31 January 2023	6	1	2	3	16.7
Margate (player-manager)	29 May 2024	7 May 2026	104	55	25	24	52.9
Dartford	7 May 2026	Present	28	18	3	7	64.3
Total			138	74	30	34	53.6
