= Pobalscoil Neasáin =

Mixed secondary school, Dublin, Ireland

Coordinates: 53.39205°N 6.13097°W

Location
- School Lane; Baldoyle, Dublin 13; Ireland

Information
- Type: Community secondary school
- Motto: Meas, Díograis, agus Dea-chroí (Respect, enthusiasm, and good heart.)
- Religious affiliation: Interdenominational
- Established: 1980
- Gender: Coeducational
- Enrolment: 810 (2023)
- Website: psn.ie

Pobalscoil Neasáin, known as "PSN" or "Nessan's", is an English-medium, co-educational and inter-denominational secondary (community) school, situated at the coastal end of Baldoyle and also serving Bayside and Sutton, Dublin, in the northern suburbs of Dublin, Ireland.

== Academic programme ==
Before the beginning of the new school year in 2020, students generally had one forty-minute class of English, Irish and maths every day. History, Geography, Religion, CSPE (Civic, Social and Political Education) and SPHE (social, personal and health education) were generally done in single-period classes, spread throughout the week. Some other subjects, such as science, PE and the practical subjects such as art, often had double periods. Due to the COVID19 pandemic, class-length was increased to 60 minutes, while the number of classes a day was decreased to six as opposed to the previous nine.

== Extra-curricular activities ==
=== Young Scientist competition ===
The school participates yearly in the Young Scientist competition and has received at least one merit award.

=== Sport ===
The school offers a variety of sports, with association football (soccer) being among the most popular and successful in regional and national age-level competitions. Students have won age-level competitions in gaelic football, hurling and basketball.

=== Debating and public speaking ===
The school has a debating group, and in 2008 won the All Ireland Secondary Schools Debating competition. Pobalscoil Neasáin has also won several trophies and titles in public speaking, including the 2011 North Dublin Rotary Club Transition year public speaking competition.

== Notable alumni ==
- Cecelia Ahern, novelist, works include PS, I Love You
- Robbie Brady, soccer player with Norwich City and the Republic of Ireland national football team
- Nicky Byrne, singer and member of Westlife
- Darragh Lynch, musician and member of Lankum
