= Nicky Byrne =

Irish pop singer (born 1978)

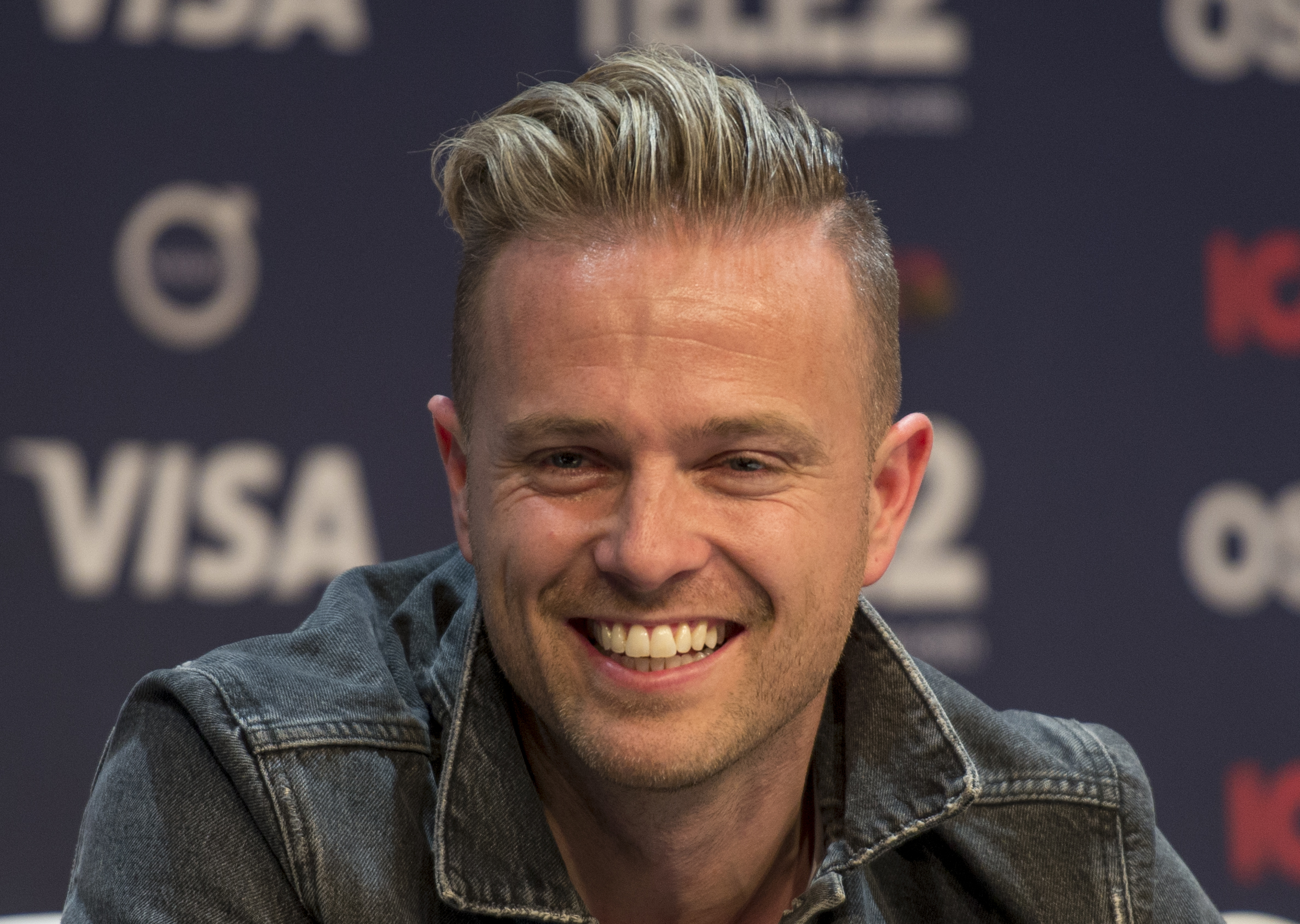
- Byrne in 2016

Background information
- Born: Nicholas Bernard James Adam McGarry Byrne Jr. 9 October 1978 (age 48); Dublin, Ireland
- Genre: Pop
- Occupations: Singer; songwriter; presenter; footballer
- Years active: 1998–present
- Labels: Warner; East West; Universal; Syco; RCA; Sony
- Member of: Westlife
- Website: nickybyrne.com
Association football career
- Position: Goalkeeper
Youth career
- Home Farm
- St. Kevin's Boys
- 1995–1997: Leeds United
Senior career*
Years	Team	Apps	(Gls)
1997	Shelbourne		
1997	→ Cobh Ramblers (loan)	11	(0)
- St. Francis
International career
- Republic of Ireland U15
- Republic of Ireland U16
- Republic of Ireland U18
- * Club domestic league appearances and goals

Nicholas Bernard James Adam Byrne Jr. (born 9 October 1978) is an Irish singer, songwriter, radio and television presenter and former professional footballer. He is a member of the pop group Westlife, one of the most successful Irish boybands of all time.

Before his music career, Byrne played as a goalkeeper, winning the FA Youth Cup with Leeds United and representing Republic of Ireland at several youth levels.

Westlife has since released twelve albums, embarked on thirteen world tours, and won some awards. He has also had a successful TV and radio presenting career.

== Football career ==
Byrne was a footballer and played for Home Farm and St. Kevin's Boys in North Dublin. He became a professional player, and joined Leeds United as a goalkeeper in 1995, and was a squad member of the FA Youth Cup winning team of 1997. He played for Leeds for two years, leaving when his contract expired in June 1997.

He played in a reserve game for Scarborough and in a trial game with Cambridge United, before returning to join Dublin club Shelbourne. He then signed for Cobh Ramblers playing 15 games in all competitions, then St. Francis, all in the League of Ireland.

He represented the Republic of Ireland at under-15, under-16 and under-18 levels.

== Music career ==
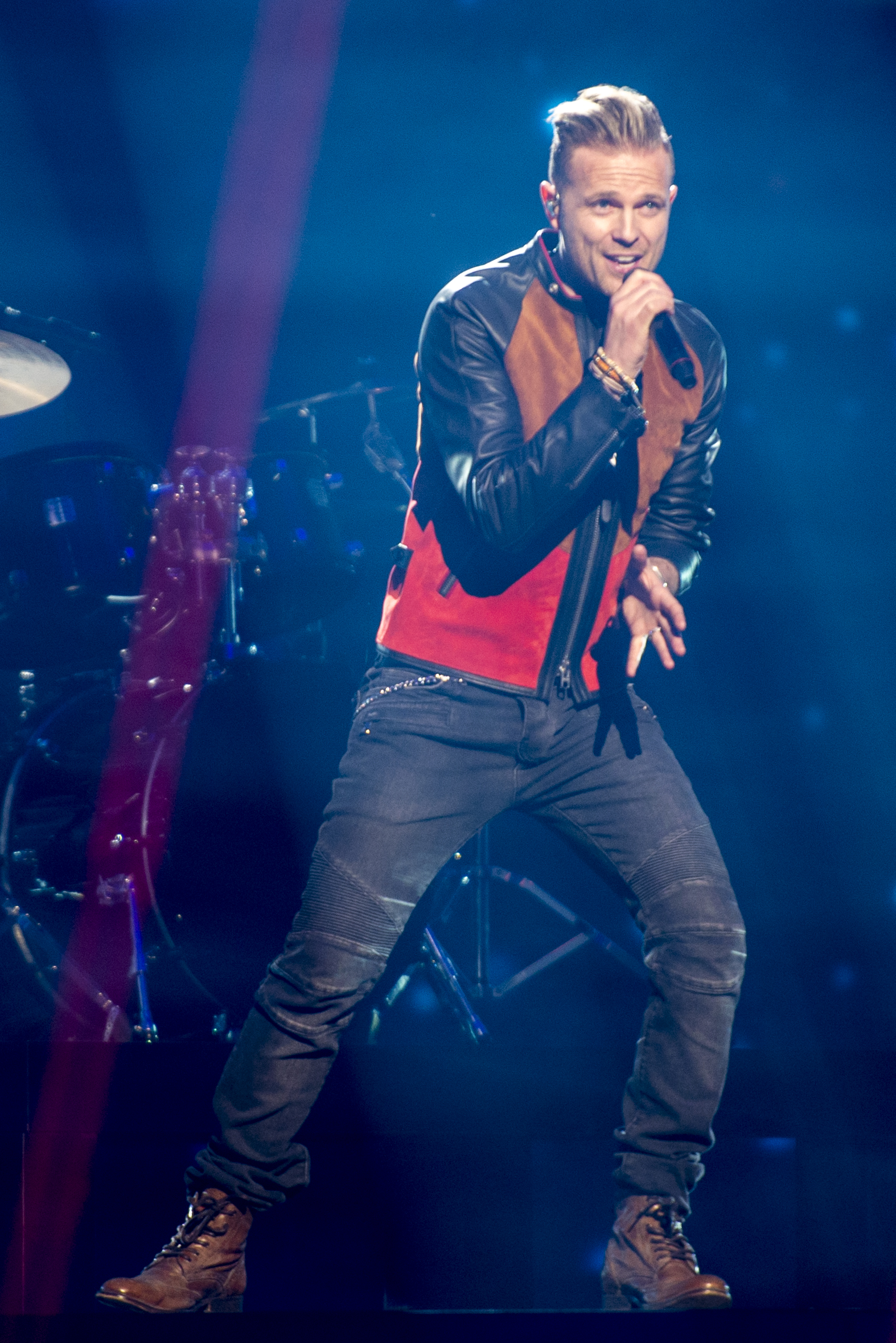
Nicky Byrne representing Ireland in the Eurovision Song Contest 2016

In June 1998, Byrne attended an audition for new Irish boyband, where Boyzone manager Louis Walsh approached him to join his new venture, Westlife. Byrne joined Westlife along with Kian Egan, Mark Feehily, Shane Filan and Brian McFadden. Byrne revealed in Westlife: Our Story that he had wanted to change the name of the band to West High; but the others preferred Westlife. With Westlife, Byrne has had 25 top ten UK singles, 14 of which were number one, 7 number one albums and has sold in excess of over 55 million records worldwide. It is certified that Westlife have sold 20.2 million records and videos in the UK across their 14-year career – 6.8 million singles, 11.9 million albums and 1.5 million videos. Byrne also had a number one single in Ireland in 2002, alongside the Republic of Ireland national football team and Dustin the Turkey with the Irish 2002 FIFA World Cup anthem, "Here Come The Good Times (Ireland)". He also co-wrote many of Westlife's songs.

In early January 2016, it was rumored that RTÉ had internally chosen Byrne to represent Ireland in the Eurovision Song Contest 2016. Byrne had not yet confirmed or denied such information but announced that he would grab the opportunity with both hands if given. On 13 January, Byrne was confirmed to be the Irish singer for the 2016 contest in Stockholm with the song, "Sunlight". He performed in the second semi final on 12 May 2016, but failed to advance to the final.

In October 2018, a video was posted to Westlife's official social media platforms announcing the group's reunion as a four-piece. In 2019, the group headlined "The 20 Tour", named in honour of Westlife's 20th anniversary since its formation and the release of its first single, "Swear It Again", in 1999. In addition to touring, Westlife also released new music. "Hello My Love", the first single from the group's eleventh album, Spectrum, debuted on the Graham Norton Show on 10 and 11 January 2019.

== Television and radio career ==
In 2003, Byrne guest-hosted an edition of CD:UK with Cat Deeley.

Byrne hosted the closing ceremony of the Special Olympics live from Dublin's Croke Park in front of 80,000 spectators.

Throughout the years, Byrne has appeared on Children in Need and Comic Relief several times. In 2001, he co-hosted Children in Need live from Belfast and in 2011 and co-hosted a BBC Radio 2 radio special with Patrick Kielty for the cause.

Byrne has narrated stage shows such as The Snowman Christmas Special and the Picture of You documentary dedicated to former Boyzone member Stephen Gately, who died on 10 October 2009.

Byrne has also hosted the Cheerios ChildLine Concert a record seven times, which was broadcast on RTÉ2, and in more recent years on TV3.

In addition, Byrne presented several editions of the Celebrity Sunday radio programme on RTÉ 2fm in 2010. Listeners tuned in from as far and wide as Mexico, Chile, the United Kingdom, Philippines and Indonesia. The fourth and final edition of the programme, broadcast on 14 February 2010, trended worldwide on Twitter. FM104 publicly offered him a job the day Westlife announced their split.

In October 2012, Byrne hosted the RTÉ reality TV show Football's Next Star. The series followed ten young hopefuls competing for a chance to win a place with Celtic Football Club's youth squad.

In 2013 through 2015, and again in 2017, 2018 and 2025, Byrne presented the Irish votes at the Eurovision Song Contest. He also co-hosted the short-lived TV talent show The Hit on RTÉ One along with Aidan Power.

On 4 February 2014, Byrne signed a contract with RTÉ 2fm to host a new weekday show from 11 am to 2 pm together with veteran DJ and presenter Jenny Greene. In March 2019, he stepped down to focus on Westlife and preparations for their upcoming tour.

In January 2015, Byrne started hosting the new weekly National Lottery game show The Million Euro Challenge on RTÉ 1, although the show was axed that July.

In January 2017, Byrne started hosting an Irish version of the TV show Dancing with the Stars, alongside Amanda Byram and with Jennifer Zamparelli from 2019.

In June 2020, he hosted RTÉ Does Comic Relief during the COVID-19 pandemic.

In October 2021, Byrne was announced as the host of a new singing competition commissioned for RTÉ entitled Last Singer Standing.

In October 2024, Byrne launched his own podcast "Nicky Byrne HQ".

== Discography ==
=== Albums ===
Title	Details	Peak chart positions		
Title	Details	IRE	SCO	UK
Sunlight	Released: 6 May 2016; Label: Universal Music Group; Format: Digital download, CD	8	65	114

=== Singles ===
==== As lead artist ====
Title	Year	Peak chart positions	Album
Title	Year	IRE	Album
"Sunlight"	2016	68	Sunlight
"Explosion"	2016	—	Sunlight

==== As featured artist ====
Title	Year	Peak chart positions
Title	Year	IRE
"Here Come the Good Times (Ireland)" (Irish 2002 FIFA World Cup anthem)	2002	1

== Songwriting ==
Byrne has co-written some songs in his Westlife years and on all ten tracks on his debut solo album and also to one unreleased song:

- "Sunlight"
- "Explosion"
- "Song For Lovers"
- "Pop Machine"
- "Still The One"
- "Some Things Always Seem To Last"
- "Finishing Line"
- "Broadway Show"
- "Thank You"
- "Pretty"
- "Talking with Jennifer"
- "Sweeping Up"
- "When You Come Around"
- "Don't Let Me Go"
- "Imaginary Diva"
- "Reason For Living"
- "Where We Belong"
- "I Won't Let You Down"
- "Singing Forever"
- "You See Friends (I See Lovers)"
- "I'm Missing Loving You"
- "Closer"
- "Last Mile of the Way"
- "The Way That You Love Me"
- "Alive"

== Personal life ==
Byrne was born to parents Yvonne and Nicholas (d. 2009) and has an older sister, Gillian and a younger brother, Adam. He was born in Dublin and grew up in the Northside area of the city, where he attended Pobalscoil Neasáin and continues to reside.

Byrne married Georgina Ahern, his secondary schoolmate, on 5 August 2003 at the Wicklow Register Office, Wicklow, County Wicklow. The civil ceremony was followed by a church blessing on 9 August at the Roman Catholic Church of St Pierre et St Paul in Gallardon, Eure-et-Loir, France.

The couple have three children, twin sons Rocco Bertie Byrne and Jay Nicky Byrne (born April 20th 2007) and daughter, Gia Byrne (born October 23rd 2013).

== Philanthropy ==
In 2010, Byrne and his family organised the 'Nikki Byrne Twilight Ball', a fundraising event, in memory of their father who died in November 2009. The event raised over €200,000 and completely funded a television and radio heart attack awareness campaign in connection with 'The Irish Heart Foundation'.

On 14 May 2009, Byrne was a substitute for a Liverpool Legends XI that played against an All Star XI in a Hillsborough Memorial match to mark the 20th anniversary of the Hillsborough disaster. All the proceeds from the match went to the Marina Dalglish appeal. A fan of Celtic, on 9 August 2011 he played in a Celtic Legends XI at Celtic Park in front of a crowd of 54,000 against a Manchester United Legends team. Byrne also participated in and won Soccer Aid 2014. He scored in the match, played at Old Trafford. He was the only non-professional player to score in the match. The Rest of the World team won the game 4–2.

== Television presenting career ==
Year	Title	Role	Notes
2003	CD:UK	Guest presenter	
2003–2004, 2008, 2010–2011, 2013–2014	ChildLine Concert	Presenter	7 specials
2012	Football's Next Star	Presenter	1 series
2013	The Hit	Presenter	1 series
2015	The Million Euro Challenge	Presenter	1 series
2017–2022	Dancing with the Stars	Presenter	5 series
2020	RTÉ Does Comic Relief	Presenter	1 special
2020	Soundtrack to My Life	Presenter	1 special
2021	Last Singer Standing	Presenter	1 series

== Honours and awards ==
Year	Ceremony	Category	Result
2001	Smash Hits Awards	Best Haircut	Won
2009	VIP Style Awards	Most Stylish Man	Won
2014	PPI Radio Awards	Best Newcomer	Won
2016	VIP Style Awards	Most Stylish Man	Won
2017	Goss.ie Awards	Most Stylish Man	Won
2018	Goss.ie Awards	Best Male TV Presenter	Won
2019	Goss.ie Awards	Best Male TV Presenter	Won
2022	VIP Style Awards	Most Stylish Man	Won

Awards and achievements
Preceded by Molly Sterling with "Playing with Numbers"	Ireland in the Eurovision Song Contest; 2016	Succeeded by Brendan Murray with "Dying to Try"
