= ChildLine Concert =

Pop music concert

- Logo for the 2008 event
- Genre: Pop
- Locations: Dublin, Ireland
- Years active: 1997 – 2014
- Website: ispcc.ie/event/cheerios-childline-concert

The ChildLine Concert, known for sponsorship reasons as the 'Cheerios ChildLine Concert', was an annual pop music charity event which took place in Ireland between 1997 and 2014. The money raised from the concerts was donated to the young person's charity, ChildLine. Performers at past events included Westlife (who performed at the concert twelve times), Robbie Williams, Anastacia, Girls Aloud, McFly, All Saints, S Club 7, Sophie Ellis-Bextor, 5ive, Sugababes, Busted, Boyzone, JLS, The Script, Little Mix, Union J and Olly Murs.

In 2003, the concerts had raised over €1 million, in 2007 that had risen to €2.5 million, and by 2013 €4.6 million had been raised. According to the ISPCC website, the events raised over €5 million between 1997 and 2014.

== History ==
The annual ChildLine Concert was founded to raise money for ChildLine, a 24-hour phone line dedicated to helping children. The performers, organisers and venue provided their services for free in order for all the money from ticket sales to go to the financial support and aid of ChildLine. The ChildLine Concert was sponsored for several years by the Cheerios brand. Acts to have performed at the concert included Robbie Williams, The Script, JLS, Girls Aloud, Enrique Iglesias, S Club 7, McFly, Little Mix, and Olly Murs.

The first ChildLine Concert was held at the Point Theatre, Dublin in 1997. By 2003 over €1 million had been raised. In 2013 it was announced that €4.6 million had been raised from the concerts between 1997 and 2012, rising to €5 million after the 2014 event.

The 2008 event was held at The O2 in Dublin, becoming the first ever concert to take place at the venue.

=== 2003 event ===
Acts who performed at the Point Theatre on 26 January included Samantha Mumba, Sugababes, Girls Aloud, Six, Busted, Mankind, Broken Hill and Big Brovaz. Westlife's Nicky Byrne, Mark Feehily and Brian McFadden hosted the event which was televised live on RTÉ Television. ChildLine received over €200,000.

=== 2008 event ===
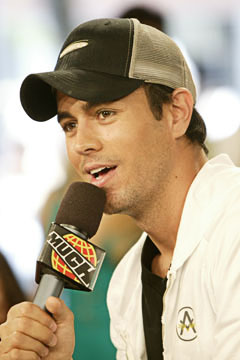
Enrique Iglesias performed at the 2008 event.

Acts who performed at the O_{2} on 16 December included Enrique Iglesias, Boyzone, Shayne Ward, Anastacia Scouting for Girls, The Script, Alphabeat, The Saturdays, Eoghan Quigg and JLS. The show was hosted by Westlife's Nicky Byrne.

=== 2009 event ===
The 2009 event was held on Wednesday 18 November at The O_{2} featuring Westlife, Alexandra Burke, JLS, Taio Cruz, Cascada, The Saturdays, and The Script. The concert raised €400,000.

=== 2010 event ===
The 2010 event was announced on 24 September 2010 and took place at The O2 on 3 December 2010 with acts including as Westlife, Shayne Ward, Jedward, Jason Derulo, The Wanted, Olly Murs, Wonderland and McFly. Nicky Byrne of Westlife hosted. The concert was broadcast on TV3 on 18 December 2010.

=== 2011 event ===
On 5 September 2011 it was announced that the 2011 Childline Concert would take place on 12 November 2011 at The O2 in Dublin. It was hosted once again by Nicky Byrne and featured Westlife, Jedward, The Wanted, JLS, Cher Lloyd and Parade. Westlife announced in October 2011 that they were retiring from music and the 2011 ChildLine Concert was their 12th and final ChildLine Concert performance. The concert raised over €400,000.

=== 2012 event ===
In October 2012 it was announced that the 15th annual Childline Concert would take place on 24 November 2012 at The O2 in Dublin. It was hosted by Keith Duffy and Glenda Gilson and the acts that took part included The Script, JLS, Little Mix, Jedward, Lawson, Stooshe, and Hudson Taylor. Irish The X Factor contestant Mary Byrne also appeared with Level 5 to sing on their charity single. The concert was broadcast on TV3 on 1 December 2012. Over €440,000 was raised.

=== 2013 event ===
The 16th annual ChildLine Concert took place on 20 November 2013 at The O2 in Dublin, the concert also celebrated ChildLine's 25th birthday. Hosted by Westlife's Nicky Byrne the line-up included The Wanted, Shane Filan, Little Mix, Union J, Conor Maynard and B*Witched. Boyzone opened the concert 16 years after helping to launch the concert in 1997 and also celebrated their 20th anniversary. Tickets went on sale 4 October 2013 and ChildLine hoped to raise €400,000 from the concert. Speaking on their continued sponsorship of the concert, Alison Healy of Cheerios said "we are delighted to once again be sponsoring the Cheerios Childline Concert and are very much looking forward to another great night in The O2." Special "Cheer for ChildLine" packs of Cheerios were also sold allowing people to send "cheer" to their favourite act and raise more money.

=== 2014 event ===
The 17th annual ChildLine Concert took place on 30 November 2014 at the 3Arena in Dublin, and was hosted by Nicky Byrne. Performers included Boyzone, Olly Murs, McBusted, Shane Filan, Jedward, and HomeTown.

== ChildLine Rocks ==
An annual concert featuring rock and indie acts from around Ireland called ChildLine Rocks was launching in 2007, acting as a rock alternative to the pop ChildLine Concert to raise money for ChildLine. The performers played for free meaning the entire ticket fee went to ChildLine.

=== 2007 event ===
The first ChildLine Rocks concert was held at The Village in Dublin in February 2007 with a sellout attendance. Republic of Loose and The Blizzards headlined.

=== 2008 event ===
Following the success of the first concert the second was held in Dublin in The Academy, a venue twice the size of The Village. It took place on 28 February 2008 with an attendance of 1,400 and had over 20 performers raising €26,000. The concert was split into three stages, The Star Stage, sponsored by the Irish Daily Star, The Phantom 105.2 Stage, sponsored by Irish radio station Phantom 105.2 (now TXFM) and the Songs of Praise Stage. It was hosted by Michelle Doherty. Acts included Cathy Davey, The Coronas, Future Kings of Spain, Ham Sandwich, Super Extra Bonus Party, Rarely Seen Above Ground and Jape as well as a selection of DJs from around Ireland and a karaoke section.

As of 2013, there had been no further ChildLine Rocks concerts.
