= Football's Next Star (Irish TV series) =

Irish reality television series

- Genre: Reality sports competition
- Presented by: Nicky Byrne
- Country of origin: Ireland
- No. of series: 1
- No. of episodes: 8

Production
- Producer: Noleen Golding
- Running time: 25 minutes
- Production company: Tyrone Productions

Original release
- Network: RTÉ Two
- Release: 2012

Related
- Football's Next Star

Football's Next Star is an Irish reality competition television series broadcast on RTÉ Two under the TRTÉ brand in late 2012. The show was based on the 2010 British television series of the same name, and aimed to find a young football player who could be the "next big thing" and reward them with a professional contract at Celtic F.C. in Scotland.

The series was presented by Westlife member and professional goalkeeper Nicky Byrne.

== Episodes ==
=== Episode 1 ===
The opening episode follows the open trials held throughout the country where we meet the young footballers all vying for a place in the next round.

=== Episode 2 ===
In episode 2, 40 contestants try their utmost to impress the football coaches from Celtic FC including Chris McCarthy, Head of Celtic's Youth Academy, and go through to the next stage of the competition. We join the contestants in the Aviva Stadium, where they battle it out to become one of the final ten.

Split into two teams, the footballers play their best and are whittled down to 20 finalists.

Ten players are then chosen:

Player	Position
Jason Murray	right back
Patrick Fitzgerald	centre back
Joseph Lennon-Maher	centre back
Kevin Loughran	left-back
Tiarnan McNicholl	right midfield
Gavin Boyne	centre midfield
Gareth McDonagh	midfield
Eoin O’Donovan	left-midfield
Evan Shine	Striker
Naseem Militti	Striker

=== Episode 3 ===
In Episode Three of Football's Next Star, we join the 10 lucky finalists as they travel to Glasgow, the home of Celtic FC. The boys are thrown straight into training at Celtic's Youth Academy, Lennox town, and play their first session for the Celtic FC coaches.

The boys also get to live like star footballers in a mansion in the Scottish countryside. They see their idols, Celtic FC's first team, play a major match in Celtic Park, and get star struck as they receive an inspirational pep talk from the Celtic manager Neil Lennon.

After three tough days of training, presenter Nicky Byrne pays them a surprise visit and explains their first major trial: the boys will play their first competitive match for Celtic FC that evening. Some of the boys will be in the 'Danger Zone' while they are playing, meaning their future at Celtic FC is hanging in the balance. Immediately after the game is over, one of the boys will be sent home. Eosin O'Donovan, Evan Sine, Jason Murray and Joseph Lennon-Maher got it in danger of elimination. Evan Shine was eliminated.

=== Episode 4 ===
Episode Four of Football's Next Star and joins the boys as they recover from their first competitive match and first elimination with a 'refreshing' dip in the Academy's ice baths. Avoiding taking the icy plunge, is Man of the Match Patrick who gets to hang out with the Celtic FC first team as his reward, as well as pick his favorite housemate to stay in a five star resort!

The boys learn how eating well is just as important as their soccer drills as they learn to cook like true soccer professionals! Naseem leads the boys in the kitchen as Head Chef that night. And it does not quite go according to plan!

But it's back to business for the lads with two tough training sessions ahead of their next game. The pressure creeps in as all the boys struggle in their training session and the Celtic coaches aren't impressed. To their shock, the boys discover that after their second match not one but two of the contestants will be sent home! Eosin O'Donovan, Tiernan McNichol, Joseph Lennon-Maher and Naseem Militia were in danger of elimination. Tiernan McNichol and Naseem Militia were eliminated.

=== Episode 5 ===
It's Episode Five of Football's Next Star and the boys are recovering from their grueling second match. Once again, Nicky is on hand to mentor and support the young finalists as they get put through their paces at Celtic FC.

In an effort to get our boys to work together more as a team, the Celtic FC coaches decide it would be a useful exercise for our players to coach the under-10 Celtic FC players. And the little players have some fancy footwork that put our boys to shame! Nicky Byrne joins in the fun and shows his competitive streak before being put through his paces as team goalie.

On recovery day, Eosin takes Gareth out go-karting while the rest of the boys take fishing trip. They bring their catch home and enjoy a late night dance-off before the next trial kicks in.

The next training session is their toughest yet as they are thrown in with the under-19 Celtic FC squad. The boys have to learn to work as a team again and to keep encouraging one another to raise team spirit. They start to work well together but who will be safe and who will be in the danger zone?

The boys face Edinburgh rivals Hibernian FC and our young footballers are put through the wringer with Hibs playing a very physical game. Between injuries and some surprising developments, the Celtic FC coaches can see who is cracking with the pressure and who is really starting to shine. Gareth McDonough, Jason Murray, and Gavin Boyne were in danger of elimination. Jason Murray was eliminated.

=== Episode 6 ===
It's episode six of Football's Next Star and it's straight back to training for the boys after their last competitive match. The lads are thrown into the deep end as they join the players who are on the fringes of Celtic's first team for their training session. Nicky doesn't get off scot free though! Celtic manager Neil Lennon spies him hiding and orders him to join the lads on the pitch!

Just in case the boys are getting any grand ideas living the superstar footballer lifestyle, they are brought back down to earth with a bump after training. Celtic's first team has just finished on the pitches and their muddy boots need to be spotless pronto.

On their all-important recovery day, Kevin takes Joey to do a spot of sightseeing in Edinburgh and get a taste of the Scottish lifestyle – sampling the traditional Scottish delicacy of haggis and trying their hand at wearing kilts – much to the delight of the Scottish ladies! Meanwhile, the rest of the boys learn how to do their stretches and poses in their first yoga lesson, much to their amusement!

However, things get serious for the lads as after their next match with Alloa Athletic not one, but two players face elimination. Only four players will make it through to the next round and this pressure on the boys shows in their performance with injuries and illness hampering the lads.

Determined to do their best, the boys push through and win the match comfortably. Their talent is really shining through and the coaches face their toughest decision so far in the competition. So tough in fact, they can't make up their minds and decide to sleep on it! With tension riding high in the household, the boys can barely wait until the next day to find out their fate. Eoin O'Donovan and Joseph Lennon-Maher were eliminated.

=== Episode 7 ===
In the penultimate episode of Football's Next Star and we join the remaining four boys as they battle it out for a place in the final!

Before they face into their next grueling challenge, Nicky Byrne arranges a couple of surprises, including a trip to Old Trafford, home of Manchester United. What's more, legendary former Celtic and Republic of Ireland goalkeeper Shay Given makes a surprise appearance. To their delight, the four lads get to have dinner with Shay and ask him questions about his early footballing days.

As part of their preparation for life as a professional footballer, the boys learn that Celtic are not only looking for the complete player on the pitch but off the pitch also. They tackle the challenge of learning how to deal with the pressures of the media and face a grilling from a tough and inquisitive sports journalist. However, while they appear confident on the pitch, it's an entirely different ball game when they are faced with a microphone!

But it's soon back to what they do best as the four remaining finalists head down south where horrendous weather conditions could affect their chances of winning a place in the final. Their match against Sunderland results in a 4–4 draw. Kevin Loughran was eliminated.

== Contestants ==
Contestant	Hometown	Outcome
Evan Shine	Limerick city	Eliminated in Episode 3
Naseem Militti	Grand Canal Dock, County Dublin	Eliminated in Episode 4
Tiarnan McNicholl	Glengormley, Belfast, County Antrim	Eliminated in Episode 4
Jason Murray	Lucan, County Dublin	Eliminated in Episode 5
Joseph Lennon-Maher	Castleknock, County Dublin	Eliminated in Episode 6
Eoin O’Donovan	Cork City	Eliminated in Episode 6
Kevin Loughran	Dunsinaire, County Monaghan	Eliminated in Episode 7
Patrick Fitzgerald	Waterford City	2nd Runner-up
Gavin Boyne	Castleknock, County Dublin	1st Runner-up
Gareth McDonagh	Greystones, County Wicklow	Winner

== Matches ==
Episode	Opponent	Captain	Score	Man of the Match
Episode 3	Airdrie UTD	Patrick Fitzgerald	1–1 (Draw)	—N/a
Episode 4	Queens Park	Gavin Boyne	4–2 (Loss)	Eoin O’Donovan
Episode 5	Hibernian	Kevin Loughran	0–2 (Win)	Kevin Loughran
Episode 6	Alloa Athletic	Joseph Lennon-Maher	3–0 (Win)	—N/a
Episode 7	Sunderland	Gareth McDonagh	4–4 (Draw)	—N/a

== Players progress ==
No.	Player	Episode 3	Episode 4	Episode 5	Episode 6	Episode 7	Episode 8	
No.	Player	Episode 3	Episode 4	Episode 5	Episode 6	Episode 7	1	2
1	Gareth	SAFE	SAFE	DANGER	SAFE	SAFE	SAFE	WINNER
2	Gavin	SAFE	SAFE	DANGER	SAFE	SAFE	SAFE	RUNNER-UP
3	Patrick	SAFE	SAFE	SAFE	SAFE	SAFE	ELIMINATED	
4	Kevin	SAFE	SAFE	SAFE	SAFE	ELIMINATED		
5	Eoin	DANGER	DANGER	SAFE	ELIMINATED			
6	Joseph	DANGER	DANGER	SAFE	ELIMINATED			
7	Jason	DANGER	SAFE	ELIMINATED				
8	Naseem	SAFE	ELIMINATED					
9	Tiarnán	SAFE	ELIMINATED					
10	Evan	ELIMINATED						

The player won Football's Next Star
The player was the runner up.
The player was in the danger zone but was not eliminated.
The player was in the danger zone and was eliminated
