= Robbie Brady =

Irish footballer (born 1992)

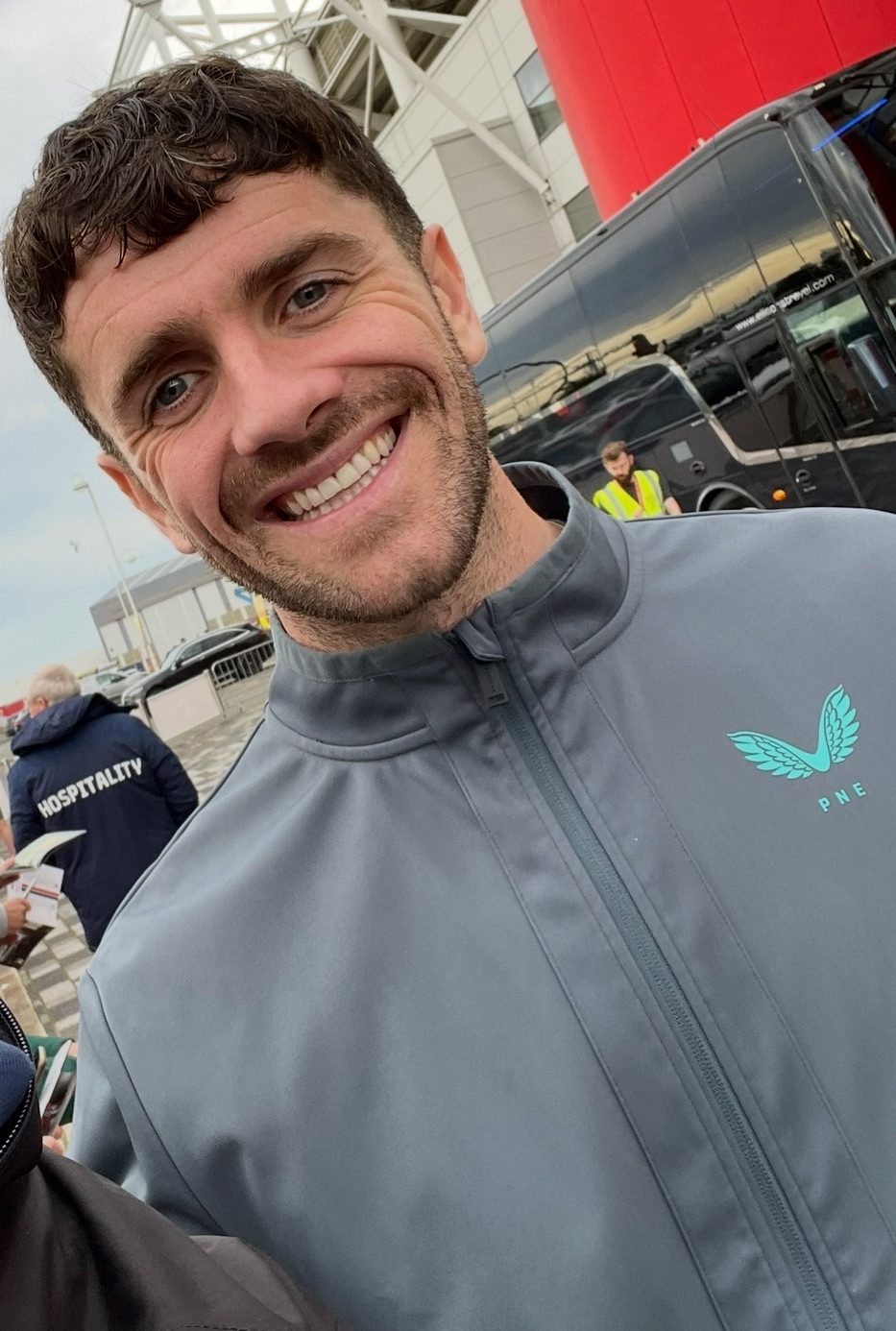
- Brady with Preston North End in 2024

Personal information
- Full name: Robert Brady
- Date of birth: 14 January 1992 (age 34)
- Place of birth: Dublin, Ireland
- Height: 1.76 m (5 ft 9 in)
- Positions: Left winger; left-back; left wing-back

Youth career
- 1998–2008: St. Kevin's Boys
- 2008–2010: Manchester United

Senior career*
Years	Team	Apps	(Gls)
2010–2013	Manchester United	1	(0)
2011–2012	→ Hull City (loan)	39	(3)
2012–2013	→ Hull City (loan)	12	(1)
2013–2015	Hull City	63	(6)
2015–2017	Norwich City	59	(7)
2017–2021	Burnley	81	(4)
2021–2022	AFC Bournemouth	6	(0)
2022–2026	Preston North End	100	(1)

International career^{‡}
2006–2007	Republic of Ireland U15	5	(1)
2007–2008	Republic of Ireland U16	5	(0)
2008	Republic of Ireland U17	8	(1)
2009–2011	Republic of Ireland U19	13	(2)
2010–2012	Republic of Ireland U21	11	(7)
2012–	Republic of Ireland	73	(10)
- * Club domestic league appearances and goals as of 17:18, 3 May 2026 (UTC) ‡ National team caps and goals as of 22:52, 26 March 2026 (UTC)

Robert Brady (born 14 January 1992) is an Irish professional footballer who plays as a left winger, left-back or left wing-back for the Republic of Ireland national team.

Brady began his career in the Manchester United academy. However, after featuring just once for United's first team, he joined Hull City initially on loan and then permanently in 2013. He made 124 appearances for the Tigers, helping them reach the 2014 FA Cup final. In July 2015, he joined Norwich City for £7 million where he suffered relegation to the EFL Championship with the club in 2016. He returned to the Premier League where he became Burnley's record signing in January 2017 when he completed a transfer for a fee reported to be around £13 million. After four-and-a-half seasons at the club, he moved to Bournemouth, where he joined them on a short-term deal. In 2022, he joined Preston North End.

Brady has represented Ireland at all youth levels. After becoming their highest under-21 scorer of all time with seven goals, he made his senior international debut, scoring and setting up two goals in his first game. He has earned over 70 caps for his country and represented them at UEFA Euro 2016, scoring two goals during the tournament.

== Club career ==
=== Early career ===
Born in Baldoyle, Dublin, Brady attended Pobalscoil Neasáin and was part of their under-16 All-Ireland Championship winning team. He was spotted by Manchester United scouts while playing for St. Kevin's Boys, and joined the club's academy shortly after his 16th birthday in January 2008. He made his first appearance for Manchester United in an under-18s match against Liverpool on 19 January 2008. His reserve team debut came just two months later, in a 3–1 win over Newcastle United.

In July 2008, Brady signed on as an academy scholar, and cemented his place in the under-18s throughout the following two seasons, as well as playing for the reserves. In the 2010–11 season, Brady graduated to the reserve team on a permanent basis. He was named as an unused substitute for the first team's League Cup Fourth Round win at home to Wolverhampton Wanderers on 26 October 2010. He made his only appearance for Manchester United on 26 September 2012, coming on as an 86th-minute substitute for Alexander Büttner in a 2–1 victory over Newcastle United in the third round of the League Cup.

=== Hull City ===
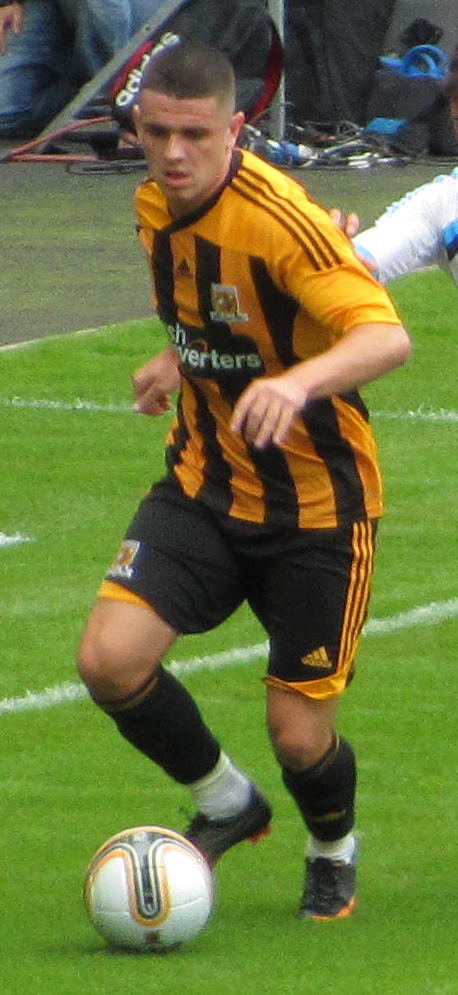
Brady on the ball for Hull City in 2011

On 19 July 2011, Manchester United loaned Brady to Championship club Hull City until 31 December. He made his debut in the first match of the season on 5 August 2011 at the KC Stadium in a 1–0 defeat to Blackpool. Three weeks later, he scored his first competitive goal for the Tigers in a 1–0 win against Reading at the KC Stadium. The loan was extended until the end of the 2011–12 season on 5 January 2012. On 21 January, Brady scored in a 1–0 win against Reading at the Madejski Stadium.

On 5 November 2012, Manchester United loaned Brady to Hull until 2 January 2013. He came off the bench the following day against Wolverhampton Wanderers as a replacement for Liam Rosenior. Brady scored his first goal since returning to Hull on 8 December 2012 against Watford; he scored with a 25-yard free kick that went in off the crossbar, making it 2–0 to Hull.

On 8 January 2013, Brady was signed by Hull on a permanent basis for an undisclosed fee.

Brady scored a first-half penalty in Hull's opening home Premier League match on 24 August 2013, giving them a 1–0 win against Norwich City. He went on to score two more goals in the Premier League the following month. He then underwent two separate groin operations which made him miss most of the rest of the season.

Brady scored three goals during the 2014–15 campaign including two goals in the second leg of the Europa League play-off round tie against Belgian Pro League side K.S.C. Lokeren on 28 August. Hull won 2–1 on the night but lost the tie on the away goals rule. There was to be more disappointment for Brady as Hull were relegated after finishing the season in 18th position, three points behind Aston Villa.

=== Norwich City ===
On 29 July 2015, Brady joined newly promoted side Norwich City on a three-year deal, for a reported fee of £7 million. He netted his first league goal in a Norwich City shirt on 26 September 2015, opening the scoring in a 2–2 draw against West Ham United at the Boleyn Ground. On 1 March 2016, Brady lost two teeth in a clash of heads with teammate Gary O'Neil in a Premier League match against Chelsea. Norwich ended the season in 19th place which meant back-to-back relegations for Brady.

Brady opened his 2016–17 goalscoring account on 1 October 2016 with a stunning 25-yard strike in the 2–1 away win at Wolverhampton Wanderers. He doubled his goal tally for the season on 5 November, opening the scoring in a 3–2 home defeat to Leeds United. On 31 December, Brady was sent off in the 0–0 draw at Brentford in a controversial decision with manager Alex Neil saying: "Robbie clearly isn't going in to injure the lad and both of them are sliding at impact, but we're not getting the rub of the green right now and that's just another example." Norwich appealed the red card shown to Brady but it was rejected, meaning the Irishman would miss the next three matches. He returned to the side for a 1–0 defeat by Southampton in the FA Cup on 18 January 2017 and scored a penalty in the following league match, a 3–1 win over Wolverhampton Wanderers. On 28 January, he made his final appearance for Norwich in a 2–0 win over Birmingham City, registering an assist for a Timm Klose goal just before half-time.

=== Burnley ===
On 31 January 2017, the final day of the January transfer window in England, Brady completed a move to Premier League club Burnley in a club record deal reportedly worth £13 million, meaning he would link up with his longtime friend Jeff Hendrick and international teammate Stephen Ward. He signed a three-and-a-half-year deal with the option of another year. Four days later, he made his Burnley debut as a second-half substitute in a 2–1 away defeat to Watford. Eight days after that, on 12 February, he scored his first Burnley goal, a 20-yard free kick, on his full debut for the club in a 1–1 home draw against league leaders Chelsea. In the following match on 25 February, Brady provided an assist for Michael Keane's equalising goal in the 1–1 draw away to Hull City, his former club.

On 27 May 2021, it was announced that Brady would leave Burnley at the end of his contract.

=== AFC Bournemouth ===
On 18 October 2021, Brady signed for Championship club AFC Bournemouth.

=== Preston North End ===
On 4 July 2022, after a successful trial, Brady signed for Preston North End on a one-year deal. On 5 June 2023, Brady signed a new two-year contract to keep him until the end of the 2024–25 season.

On 28 May 2025, Preston announced that Brady had signed a new one-year contract extension, running until 2026.

In September 2025, it was announced that Brady had suffered a calf injury which required surgery, keeping him out of action for several months and subsequently forcing him to miss the 2026 FIFA World Cup qualifiers for the Ireland national team.

On 19 May 2026, Preston announced Brady would be released from the club when his contract expired in the summer.

== International career ==
=== Youth ===
In September 2010, Brady made his under-21 debut in the Cornaredo Stadium in Lugano. On 9 August 2011, Brady scored two goals in a 2–1 win for Republic of Ireland U21s in a friendly match against Austria U21s. He also scored in the 2013 European Championship qualifiers against Hungary and Liechtenstein.

On 26 February 2012, Brady was named 2011 Under-21 International Player of the Year for his terrific performances throughout the year. In September 2012, he became the record goalscorer at Irish under-21 level with his seventh goal for his country.

=== Senior ===
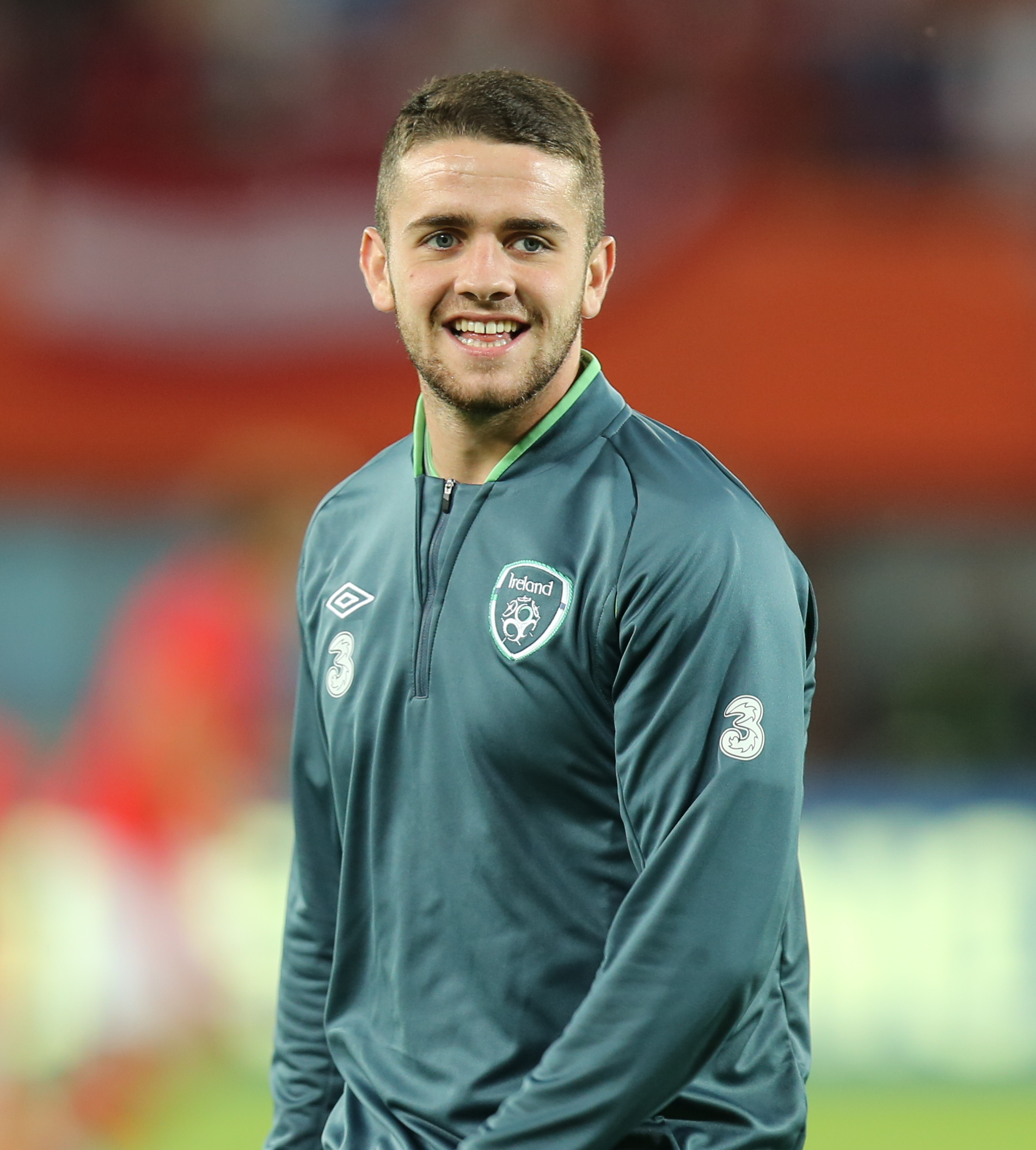
Brady training with the Republic of Ireland before a 2014 FIFA World Cup qualifying match in 2013

On 8 September 2012, Brady received his first senior international call-up for a friendly against Oman. He scored and set up two more goals in a 4–1 victory over the Arab opponents. On 18 November 2014, he scored his first brace for Ireland against the United States. On 29 March 2015, Brady started at left-back in Ireland's Euro 2016 qualifier against Poland at the Aviva Stadium in a match that finished 1–1. On 13 November, Brady scored in the 82nd minute of the crucial Euro 2016 play-off first leg match against Bosnia and Herzegovina to earn a 1–1 draw. Three days later, he assisted one of Jonathan Walters' two goals to earn Ireland a 2–0 victory and qualification to UEFA Euro 2016.

On 22 June 2016, Brady scored a crucial header against Italy in the 85th minute of Ireland's last Euro 2016 group stage match resulting in a 1–0 victory, which enabled Ireland to progress to the knockout stage of the competition as one of the best-performing third-placed teams. He also scored a penalty in Ireland's 2–1 defeat to the host nation, France, as The Boys in Green exited the tournament in the Round of 16 stage.

On 28 March 2017, Brady captained Ireland for the first time in a 1–0 defeat friendly international defeat against Iceland at the Aviva Stadium.

== Personal life ==
Brady is in a relationship with choreographer Kerrie Harris, who runs a dance school in Dublin. The couple have three children; their eldest daughter Halle, an actress, was born in 2014, followed by a son in 2019 and a younger daughter in 2024. Brady's younger brother, Gareth, has played internationally for Ireland at under-17 level. His other brother, Liam, also appeared for Ireland at under-18 level.

== Career statistics ==
=== Club ===
As of match played 3 May 2025

Appearances and goals by club, season and competition
Club	Season	League			FA Cup		League Cup		Other		Total	
Club	Season	Division	Apps	Goals	Apps	Goals	Apps	Goals	Apps	Goals	Apps	Goals
Manchester United	2010–11	Premier League	0	0	0	0	0	0	0	0	0	0
Manchester United	2011–12	Premier League	0	0	—		—		—		0	0
Manchester United	2012–13	Premier League	0	0	—		1	0	0	0	1	0
Manchester United	Total		0	0	0	0	1	0	0	0	1	0
Hull City	2011–12	Championship	39	3	2	0	0	0	—		41	3
Hull City	2012–13	Championship	32	4	1	0	—		—		33	4
Hull City	2013–14	Premier League	16	3	1	0	1	1	—		18	4
Hull City	2014–15	Premier League	27	0	1	0	1	1	3 (Note: Appearances in UEFA Europa League)	2	32	3
Hull City	Total		114	10	5	0	2	2	3	2	124	14
Norwich City	2015–16	Premier League	36	3	0	0	0	0	—		36	3
Norwich City	2016–17	Championship	23	4	1	0	2	0	—		26	4
Norwich City	Total		59	7	1	0	2	0	0	0	62	7
Burnley	2016–17	Premier League	14	1	—		—		—		14	1
Burnley	2017–18	Premier League	15	1	0	0	2	2	—		17	3
Burnley	2018–19	Premier League	16	0	1	0	0	0	0	0	17	0
Burnley	2019–20	Premier League	17	1	1	0	0	0	—		18	1
Burnley	2020–21	Premier League	19	1	1	0	1	0	—		21	1
Burnley	Total		81	4	3	0	3	2	0	0	87	6
AFC Bournemouth	2021–22	Championship	6	0	1	0	0	0	—		7	0
Preston North End	2022–23	Championship	34	0	2	0	0	0	0	0	36	0
Preston North End	2023–24	Championship	32	1	0	0	0	0	0	0	32	1
Preston North End	2024–25	Championship	29	0	2	1	1	0	0	0	32	1
Preston North End	Total		95	1	4	1	1	0	0	0	100	2
Career total			355	22	14	1	9	4	3	2	381	29

=== International ===
As of match played 26 March 2026

Appearances and goals by national team and year
National team	Year	Apps	Goals
Republic of Ireland	2012	4	1
Republic of Ireland	2013	2	0
Republic of Ireland	2014	5	2
Republic of Ireland	2015	9	1
Republic of Ireland	2016	11	3
Republic of Ireland	2017	8	0
Republic of Ireland	2018	2	0
Republic of Ireland	2019	5	1
Republic of Ireland	2020	8	0
Republic of Ireland	2021	3	0
Republic of Ireland	2022	3	1
Republic of Ireland	2023	0	0
Republic of Ireland	2024	8	1
Republic of Ireland	2025	4	0
Republic of Ireland	2026	1	0
Total		73	10

As of match played 23 March 2025. Republic of Ireland score listed first, score column indicates score after each Brady goal.

International goals by date, venue, cap, opponent, score, result and competition
No.	Date	Venue	Cap	Opponent	Score	Result	Competition
1	11 September 2012	Craven Cottage, London, England	1	Oman	2–0	4–1	Friendly
2	18 November 2014	Aviva Stadium, Dublin, Ireland	11	United States	2–1	4–1	Friendly
3	18 November 2014	Aviva Stadium, Dublin, Ireland	11	United States	4–1	4–1	Friendly
4	13 November 2015	Bilino Polje Stadium, Zenica, Bosnia and Herzegovina	19	Bosnia and Herzegovina	1–0	1–1	UEFA Euro 2016 qualifying
5	22 June 2016	Stade Pierre-Mauroy, Villeneuve-d'Ascq, France	26	Italy	1–0	1–0	UEFA Euro 2016
6	26 June 2016	Parc Olympique Lyonnais, Lyon, France	27	France	1–0	1–2	UEFA Euro 2016
7	31 August 2016	Aviva Stadium, Dublin, Ireland	28	Oman	1–0	4–0	Friendly
8	10 June 2019	Aviva Stadium, Dublin, Ireland	45	Gibraltar	2–0	2–0	UEFA Euro 2020 qualifying
9	27 September 2022	Aviva Stadium, Dublin, Ireland	59	Armenia	3–2	3–2	2022–23 UEFA Nations League B
10	10 October 2024	Helsinki Olympic Stadium, Helsinki, Finland	67	Finland	2–1	2–1	2024–25 UEFA Nations League B

== Honours ==
Individual

- FAI Under-21 International Player of the Year: 2011, 2012
- FAI Young International Player of the Year: 2015, 2016
- FAI Senior International Player of the Year: 2016, 2024
