= Marco Monti =

Italian footballer (born 1967)

Personal information
- Full name: Marco Angelo Monti
- Date of birth: 2 July 1967 (age 59)
- Place of birth: Monza, Italy
- Height: 5 ft 8 in (1.73 m)
- Position: Defender

Team information
- Current team: Internazionale (Technical Director/Youth coach/Scout)

Youth career
- 1985–1996: Internazionale

Senior career*
Years	Team	Apps	(Gls)
1985–1986	Internazionale	0	(0)
1986–1988	Alzano Virescit	54	(1)
1988–1990	Lazio	39	(0)
1990–1991	Atalanta	6	(0)
1991–1993	Reggiana	48	(0)
1993–1994	Ravenna	11	(0)
1994–1995	Lecco	10	(0)

International career
1981–1983	Italy U16	5	(0)
1983–1984	Italy U17	6	(0)
1984–1985	Italy U18		
1985–1988	Italy U21		
- * Club domestic league appearances and goals as of 12:07, 20 January 2010 (UTC)

Marco Angelo Monti (born 2 July 1967) is an Italian former footballer who played for his country Italy in the Italy U21, Italy U18, Italy U17, Italy U16 and numerous clubs, including Inter Milan, Lazio, Atalanta, Reggiana, Ravenna and Lecco.

Monti is currently working at Internazionale-Inter Milan FC as a Technical Director-Academy alongside youth team coach role (Under-12, Under-14, Under-16, Under-18). He was also featured in the television programme Football's Next Star, a football reality show aimed at British and Irish youth players competing to win a contract with Internazionale. Monti has played alongside some very big names in the world of football such as Maradona while Maradona was playing for Napoli and Marco Monti played for Lazio.Marco also played against the likes of Ruud Gullit, Frank Rijkaard, Marco van Basten, Paolo Maldini and many more such great legends.

== Players coached ==
- Mario Balotelli
- Davide Santon
- Obafemi Martins
- Leonardo Bonucci
- Jonathan Biabiany
- Mattia Destro
- Luca Siligardi
- Andrej Beleckij
- Rene Krhin
- Francesco Bolzoni
- Lorenzo Crisetig
- Marco Andreolli
