= Football's Next Star =

2010 British reality television series

- Genre: Reality sports competition
- Starring: Jamie Redknapp (mentor); Marco Monti and Paolo Migliavacca (Coaches)
- Voices of: Seb Fontaine
- Country of origin: United Kingdom
- Original language: English
- No. of series: 1
- No. of episodes: 7

Production
- Running time: 60mins (inc. adverts)
- Production company: Initial

Original release
- Network: Sky1
- Release: 3 January – 14 February 2010

Related
- Football Icon

Football's Next Star is a British reality competition television series broadcast on Sky1 in early 2010. The show aimed to find a young football player who could be the "next big thing" and reward them with a professional contract at Inter Milan in Italy.

== Contestants ==
The ten players chosen by coach Marco Monti in the first episode were:

Player	Position
Nathan Simpson	right back
Jordan Fincher	centre back
Gavin Colton	centre back
Reece McGillion	left back
Anthony O'Connor	right winger and striker
Craig Walsh	centre midfielder
Dominic Matcham	centre midfielder
Ben Greenhalgh	left winger
Connor Smith	striker
Niall Foy	striker

== Episodes ==
=== Episode 1 ===
Episode 1 starts with the roads shows across the United Kingdom and Ireland where the best forty players are chosen. They battle it out for a spot in the top twenty, then the top ten who go to Milan to compete for the professional contract. Once there one or more players are eliminated each week until the winner is chosen.

Overall seven thousand boys applied for a chance to win the contract. Jamie Redknapp explains that the player Inter Milan are looking for will need to be able to handle life in Italy along with the skill and technique required of a professional footballer. Inter youth coaches Marco Monti and Paolo Migilavacca along with Redknapp attended the road shows. They crossed the Irish Sea in the hunt for players to Dublin and, with Ireland only having a handful of professional football clubs, Jamie Redknapp believed there may be some hidden talent to be found here. One of the players to impress was midfielder Craig Walsh a Dublin native who had won several youth trophies. Craig was selected for the final forty along with eight other Irish players including Connor Smith from Westmeath and Gavin Colton from Leixlip. As well as Gavin Colton and Craig Walsh both of Cherry Orchard football club.

At the roadshows in Scotland, the low turn-out highlighted a worrying trend in Scottish football at the moment. Redknapp visited Scottish club Blackburn United who showed their facilities and how vandalism had held back the club's development. Only four players from Scotland made the final forty including Nathan Taylor from Blackburn United and Reece McGillion from Glasgow. At the Manchester road shows striker Jamie Matthews made a good impression on the judges and was selected for the last forty. It was clear that his life dream was to be a professional footballer. From the London road show some of the players to stand out were Nathan Simpson from Plaistow and Anthony O'Connor from Wembley.

From the thousands of hopefuls across the United Kingdom and Ireland the judges selected forty players but only ten would make it to Italy to compete for the professional contract. Over one weekend the forty were whittled down to twenty. The twenty then competed in a one-hour match to enable the coaches to choose the best ten. The match saw a battle of the strikers between Hicham Abdellah from London and Jamie Matthews from Manchester. Jamie Matthews scored first but was injured soon after when he had a collision with the goalkeeper. Meanwhile, English-born Hicham Abdellah of Moroccan descent went on to make an impression on the judges by netting several quality goals. Defender Jordan Fincher also impressed the judges. Scottish defender Reece McGillion from Glasgow also impressed with his decision-making during the game. Craig Walsh from Dublin was a major force in midfield and outshone his opponent Dominic Matcham from Cornwall, who at half-time was talked to by Redknapp to get him focused on reaching the top ten. Ben Greenhalgh from Orpington also had a good game, and he laid on a perfect cross for Hicham Abdellah to head home. At the end of the episode the judges had made their decision and presented the Inter Milan shirt to ten players who would now travel to Italy to compete for their dream of a professional contract in later episodes.

=== Episode 2 ===
Episode 2 and the ten hopefuls arrive in Italy. They were amazed by the Lake Como villa they would be staying in and started to enjoy the professional footballer’s style of life. They could not relax for too long though and in just three days one of the ten would be packing his bags to go home again. After the first morning the pressure began; each of the players were optimistic, but also very nervous. After their first training session in Inter Milan’s state-of-the-art training complex, Interello, they were shown around the San Siro by coach Marco Monti and it gave them a real feel of how close they were to a chance of playing for Inter Milan.

On the second training session the players were given baptism of fire training-wise and the players realised that Marco Monti meant business and had high training standards. The boys also started to take language lessons in Italian to some of their amusement. After just two days in Milan, tension started in the Villa. Jordan Fincher was not happy when Irish defender Gavin Colton teased him about not wanting to do Marco's suggestion of ten minutes in the cold swimming pool. Irish midfielder Craig Walsh was suffering from blisters and was also home-sick with little sympathy from Hicham Abdellah. The strict diet and heat was getting to all the players. And on just the second training session the judges had pick two players in contention to be eliminated from the competition. Dominic Matcham and Nathan Simpson were the two that Marco felt did not give a good display in training and fall into the danger zone. They were only given sixty minutes in a game against a talented Italian youth side to prove that they were good enough to stay in Italy. Craig Walsh reached breaking point and was called aside by Jamie Redknapp for a heart-to-heart who advised him not to throw away his dream.

Crunch time came with the big match and when Nathan Simpson gave away a free kick for pushing a player the boys conceded a goal. It was not looking good for Nathan Simpson at that stage but his performance improved and in the second half he managed to play some good football. Dominic Matcham however never managed to get into the game fully. Scottish defender Reece McGillion played a wonderful pass to Hicham Abdellah who again scored, much to the happiness of coach Marco Monti. The match ended up one goal apiece, With Marco praising Ben Greenhalgh as being the best player. Jamie Redknapp was also very impressed by the players and believed they had done well for a team that had only been together a few days. It then came to the moment of truth and the judges told Dominic Matcham he was the first to have to leave and pack his bags for the long journey back to England. It became too much for Matcham who left the show in tears. Dominic Matcham is currently playing for Tavistock and has had trials with Crystal Palace in December 2009.

=== Episode 3 ===
Craig Walsh was still battling home sickness, but coach Marco Monti persuaded him to see it out for the rest of the week. A few days later, the coach made his decision on who would be in the danger zone. Marco also made Walsh his captain for the game against Internazionale's Under-17s. This week, Marco was furious about the state of the Lake Como villa the boys live in. They all got a rollicking, though Irish players Gavin Colton and Connor Smith were rewarded for their good behaviour by getting to meet Luís Figo.

Earlier in the week Gavin asked Inter manager José Mourinho, who all the boys met, if they could train with the first team. Mourinho chose Gavin to train with his first team stars for 10 minutes. Gavin found himself showing what he could do alongside Samuel Eto'o, Patrick Vieira, Mario Balotelli and Sulley Muntari. After the week's training sessions, Monti decided that centre back Jordan Fincher and winger Anthony O'Connor would be in the danger zone. O'Connor asked Monti if he could play in his preferred position of striker. Monti agreed and switched Connor Smith to the right-wing.

The lads played a game against Allievi Nazionali, Inter's Under-17s. Jordan Fincher played a poor back pass to the keeper and the Inter man punished his error by calmly slotting the ball in the net. The boys then went 2-0 down but when Craig Walsh's, who was captain, shot was turned in by Hicham Abdellah who Jamie Redknapp quoted "Hicham always seems to score" and made the score look more respectable. After the game Marco Monti decided that Jordan Fincher would have to leave Italy and return to England. Fincher left his shirt alongside Dominic Matcham's in the Inter dressing room before returning to England with his dreams dashed. Jordan Fincher has had trials with Cardiff City in January 2010.

=== Episode 4 ===
The team went to a spa hotel in Bellagio on Lake Como for a rest and recreational session. Coach Marco Monti announced that Hicham Abdellah was Man of the Match in the last game. Hicham earned a free massage and was allowed to choose one other player to have the same treat. This caused controversy, with rivalry between Hicham and Anthony coming to the fore. Jamie Redknapp told the team to put egos to one side before their next match against Monza youth. For the first time three people were in the danger zone: Anthony O’Connor, Nathan Simpson and Reece McGillion. The match was a draw and Reece went. Defender Gavin Colton injured his arm in a collision with his own keeper.

=== Episode 5 ===
With seven hopefuls left, the players get an invite to a Milan Fashion Week party. The work has stepped up a level and the group are training with Primavera, Inter's top youth squad, and they face a 7-a-side match against them to decide who's eliminated this week. It's striker Hicham Abdellah's birthday but he finds himself in the danger zone with Nathan Simpson and Anthony O'Connor. The match sees a shock result, with Marco's boys beating Primavera. Leading goalscorer Hicham survives, and Nathan and Anthony are sent home.

=== Episode 6 ===
This is the penultimate episode, when the five remaining contestants are whittled down to three by coach Marco Monti. The five are watched in intensive training sessions, interviewed individually by Marco and tested on their knowledge of basic Italian. Marco decides Connor Smith and Craig Walsh will be in next week's Final. Ben Greenhalgh, Hicham Abdellah and Gavin Colton must prove themselves in a game against a top youth team from Monza, and only one will join Connor and Craig in the Final. Ben survives, and Gavin and Hicham are sent home.

=== Episode 7 ===
The Final. After midfielder Craig Walsh was eliminated by coach Marco, English winger Ben Greenhalgh and Irish midfielder Connor Smith went head to head to impress in the ultimate training session with Inter's first team. Playing with Vieira, Materazzi, Lucio and a host of other stars who would go on to win Serie A, the Italian Cup and the Champions League that season, Ben and Connor awaited the verdict of the academy coaches. Ben Greenhalgh was eventually chosen as Football's Next Star, receiving his Inter shirt from first team coach Jose Mourinho.

== Players progress ==
No.	Player	Episode 2	Episode 3	Episode 4	Episode 5	Episode 6	Episode 7
1	Ben	SAFE	SAFE	SAFE	SAFE	DANGER	WINNER
2	Connor	SAFE	SAFE	SAFE	SAFE	SAFE	RUNNER-UP
3	Craig	SAFE	SAFE	SAFE	SAFE	SAFE	ELIMINATED
4	Hicham	SAFE	SAFE	SAFE	DANGER	ELIMINATED	
5	Gavin	SAFE	SAFE	SAFE	SAFE	ELIMINATED	
6	Anthony	SAFE	DANGER	DANGER	ELIMINATED		
7	Nathan	DANGER	SAFE	DANGER	ELIMINATED		
8	Reece	SAFE	SAFE	ELIMINATED			
9	Jordan	SAFE	ELIMINATED				
10	Dominic	ELIMINATED					

The player won Football's Next Star
The player was the runner up.
The player was eliminated the day before the ultimate training session.
The player was in the danger zone but was not eliminated.
The player was in the danger zone and was eliminated

== After the show ==
After his 6-month professional contract at Inter Milan came to an end Ben Greenhalgh was released from their academy and signed for Non-League football clubs Welling United, before joining Maidstone United and Ebbsfleet United. In June 2013 he transferred to Scottish club Inverness Caledonian Thistle, making his Scottish Premiership debut in a 2–0 win at home to Heart of Midlothian on 31 August. The most successful player has been Connor Smith who has played league football with Watford, Plymouth Argyle & Yeovil Town.

== International versions ==
Country	Title	Broadcaster	Presenter	Original run	Prize
Ireland	Football's Next Star	RTÉ Two	Nicky Byrne	Autumn 2012	Professional contract at Celtic F.C.
Brazil	Menino de Ouro	SBT	Paulo Sérgio	24 March 2013	
Jordan	L'M3allem	ON TV	Yazan Hamdan	Ramadan 2020	Professional contract at AC Milan
