= Ireland in the Eurovision Song Contest 2015 =

- Eurovision Song Contest 2015
- Participating broadcaster: Raidió Teilifís Éireann (RTÉ)
- Country: Ireland
- Selection process: Eurosong 2015
- Selection date: 27 February 2015

Competing entry
- Song: "Playing with Numbers"
- Artist: Molly Sterling
- Songwriters: Molly Sterling; Greg French

Placement
- Semi-final result: Failed to qualify (12th)

Participation chronology

Ireland was represented at the Eurovision Song Contest 2015 with the song "Playing with Numbers", written by Greg French and Molly Sterling, and performed by Sterling herself. The Irish participating broadcaster, Raidió Teilifís Éireann (RTÉ), organised the national final Eurosong 2015 in order to select its entry for the contest. Five songs faced the votes of five regional juries and a public televote, ultimately resulting in the selection of "Playing with Numbers" performed by Molly Sterling as the Irish Eurovision entry.

Ireland was drawn to compete in the second semi-final of the Eurovision Song Contest which took place on 21 May 2015. Performing during the show in position 2, "Playing with Numbers" was not announced among the top 10 entries of the second semi-final and therefore did not qualify to compete in the final. It was later revealed that Ireland placed twelfth out of the 17 participating countries in the semi-final with 35 points.

== Background ==
Prior to the 2015 contest, Raidió Teilifís Éireann (RTÉ) and its predecessor national broadcasters have participated in the Eurovision Song Contest representing Ireland forty-eight times since RÉ's first entry in 1965. They have won the contest a record seven times in total. Their first win came in 1970, with "All Kinds of Everything" performed by Dana. Ireland holds the record for being the only country to win the contest three times in a row (in 1992, 1993, and 1994), as well as having the only three-time winner (Johnny Logan, who won in 1980 as a singer, 1987 as a singer-songwriter, and again in 1992 as a songwriter). In 2014, "Heartbeat" performed by Can-linn featuring Kasey Smith, failed to qualify to the final.

As part of its duties as participating broadcaster, RTÉ organises the selection of its entry in the Eurovision Song Contest and broadcasts the event in the country. The broadcaster confirmed its intentions to participate at the 2015 contest on 20 May 2014. From 2008 to 2014, RTÉ had set up the national final Eurosong to choose both the song and performer to compete at Eurovision for Ireland, with both the public and regional jury groups involved in the selection. For the 2015 contest, RTÉ announced on 13 October 2014 the organisation of Eurosong 2015 to choose the artist and song. The competition format differed from the previous four years with a public entry submission process indicating the abandonment of the mentor system that involved five music professionals each selecting one entry for the competition.

== Before Eurovision ==
=== Eurosong 2015 ===
Eurosong 2015 was the national final format developed by RTÉ in order to select its entry for the Eurovision Song Contest 2015. The competition was held on 27 February 2015 at the Studio 4 of RTÉ in Dublin, hosted by Ryan Tubridy and broadcast on RTÉ One during a special edition of The Late Late Show. The show was also broadcast online via RTÉ's official website rte.ie.

==== Competing entries ====
On 13 October 2014, RTÉ opened a submission period where artists and composers were able to submit their entries for the competition until 31 October 2014. At the closing of the deadline, over 300 entries were received. The competing entries were selected through two phases involving two separate jury panels with members appointed by RTÉ; the first phase involved the first jury reviewing all of the submissions and shortlisting 40 to 50 entries, while the second phase involved the second jury selecting the five finalists. The finalists were presented on 9 February 2015 during The Ray D'Arcy Show broadcast on RTÉ Radio 1.

Artist	Song	Songwriter(s)
Alex Saint	"She's So Fine"	Tony Adams-Rosa
Erika Selin	"Break Me Up"	Gustav Eurén, Niclas Arn, Danne Attlerud
Kat Mahon	"Anybody Got a Shoulder?"	Charlie McGettigan
Molly Sterling	"Playing with Numbers"	Molly Sterling, Greg French
Nikki Kavanagh	"Memories (In Melody)"	Lee Anna James, Elena Moroșanu, Simon Gribbe, Johnny Sanchez, Dimitri Stassos

==== Final ====
The national final took place on 27 February 2015 and featured guest performances from Niamh Kavanagh, Paul Harrington and Linda Martin as well as commentary from a panel that consisted of Martin, composer Phil Coulter, presenter Mairead Farrell and drag artist Panti Bliss. Following the 50/50 combination of votes from five regional juries and public televoting, "Playing with Numbers" performed by Molly Sterling was selected as the winner.

Final – 27 February 2015
R/O	Artist	Song	Jury	Televote	Total	Place
1	Alex Saint	"She's So Fine"	22	20	42	5
2	Kat Mahon	"Anybody Got a Shoulder?"	50	50	100	2
3	Erika Selin	"Break Me Up"	48	40	88	3
4	Nikki Kavanagh	"Memories (In Melody)"	36	30	66	4
5	Molly Sterling	"Playing with Numbers"	44	60	104	1

Detailed Regional Jury Votes
R/O	Song	Galway	Cork	Dublin	Limerick	Sligo	Total
1	"She's So Fine"	6	4	4	4	4	22
2	"Anybody Got a Shoulder?"	12	10	12	6	10	50
3	"Break Me Up"	8	12	10	10	8	48
4	"Memories (In Melody)"	10	6	6	8	6	36
5	"Playing with Numbers"	4	8	8	12	12	44

== At Eurovision ==
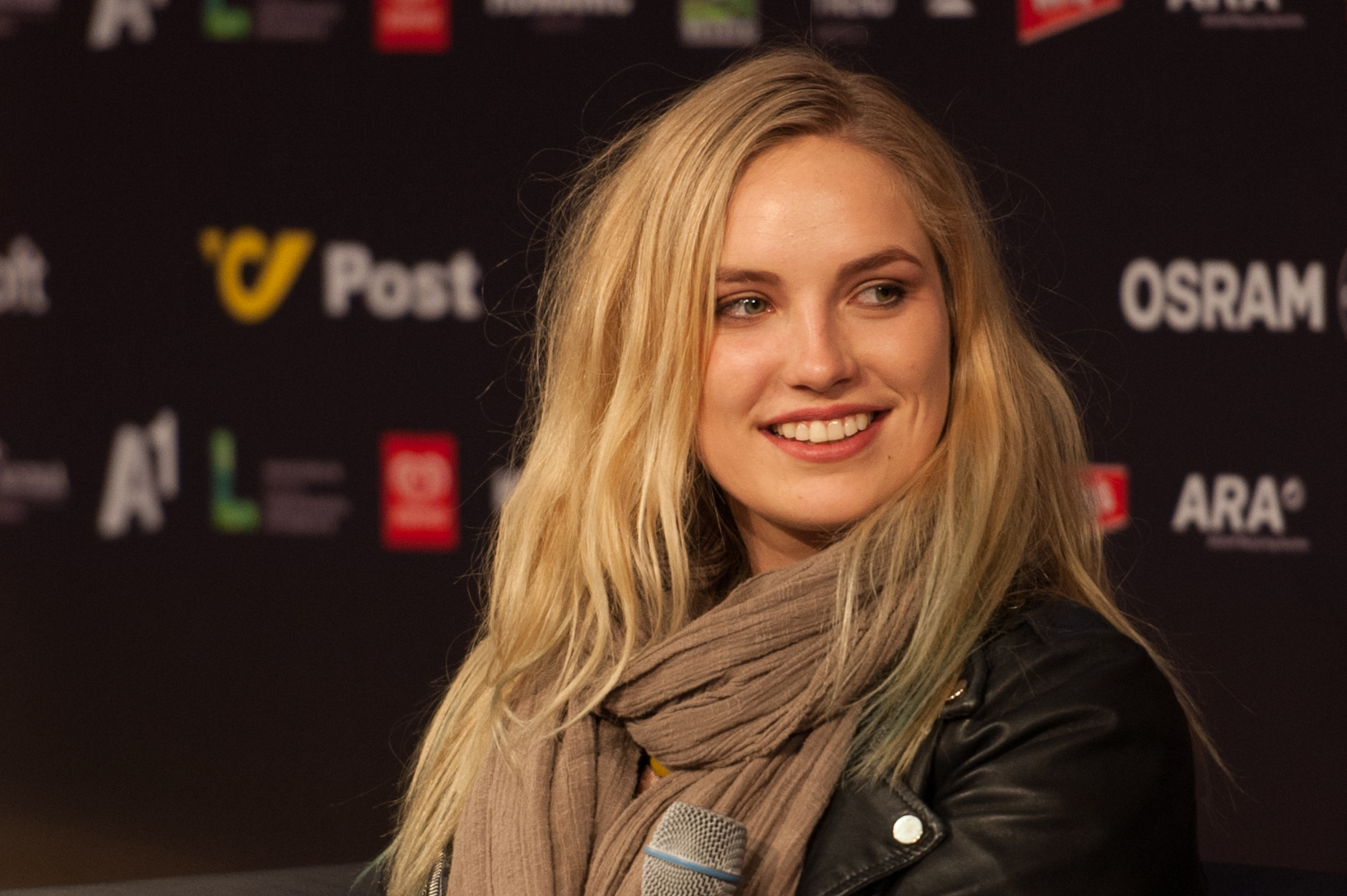
Molly Sterling during a press meet and greet

According to Eurovision rules, all nations with the exceptions of the host country and the "Big Five" (France, Germany, Italy, Spain and the United Kingdom) are required to qualify from one of two semi-finals in order to compete for the final; the top ten countries from each semi-final progress to the final. The European Broadcasting Union (EBU) split up the competing countries into six different pots based on voting patterns from previous contests, with countries with favourable voting histories put into the same pot. On 26 January 2015, a special allocation draw was held which placed each country into one of the two semi-finals, as well as which half of the show they would perform in. Ireland was placed into the second semi-final, to be held on 21 May 2015, and was scheduled to perform in the first half of the show.

Once all the competing songs for the 2015 contest had been released, the running order for the semi-finals was decided by the shows' producers rather than through another draw, so that similar songs were not placed next to each other. Ireland was set to perform in position 2, following the entry from Lithuania and before the entry from San Marino.

In Ireland, the two semi-finals were broadcast on RTÉ2 and the final was broadcast on RTÉ One with all three shows featuring commentary by Marty Whelan. The second semi-final and final were also broadcast via radio on RTÉ Radio 1 with commentary by Shay Byrne and Zbyszek Zalinski. The Irish spokesperson, who announced the Irish votes during the final, was Nicky Byrne.

=== Semi-final ===
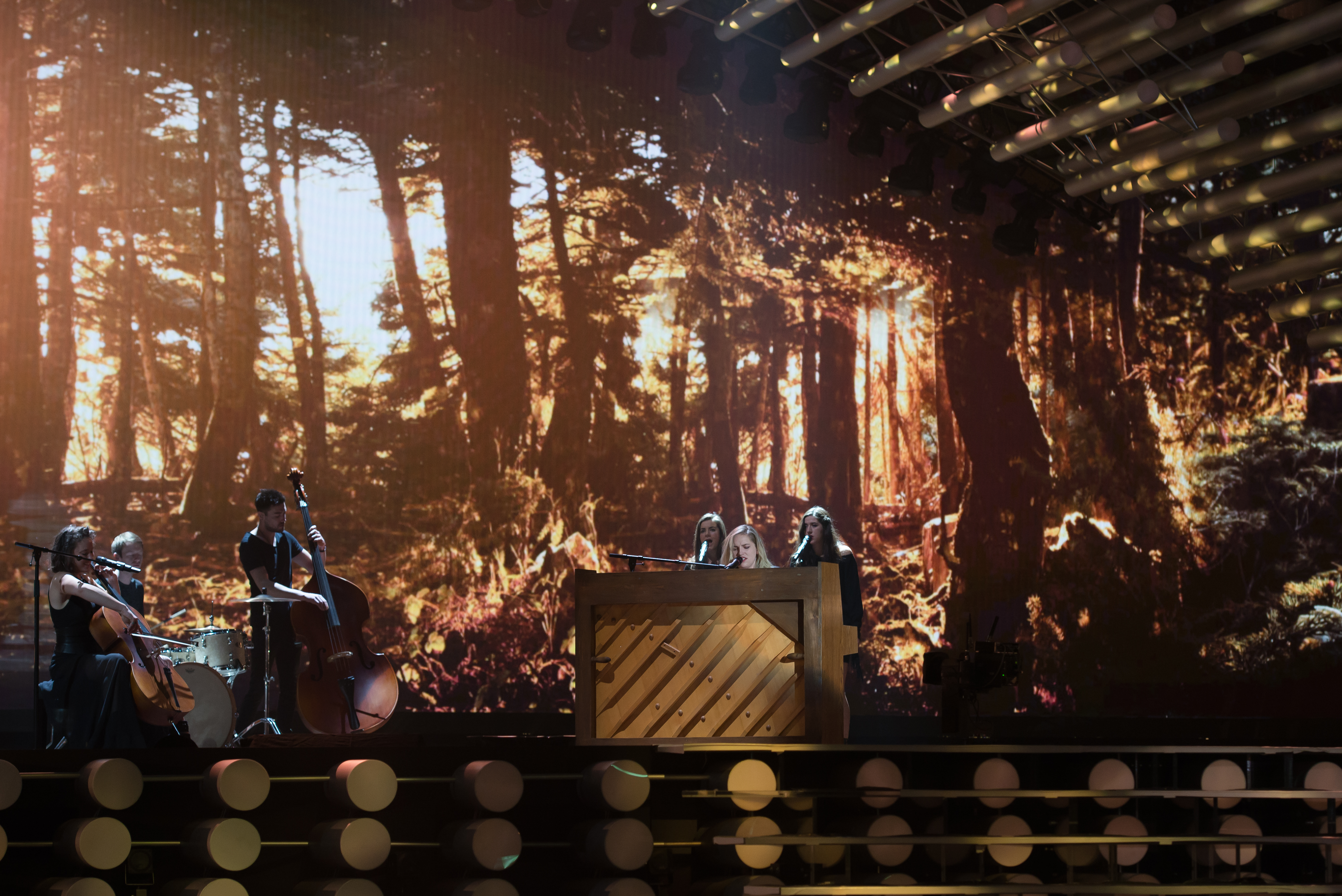
Molly Sterling during a rehearsal before the second semi-final

Molly Sterling took part in technical rehearsals on 13 and 16 May, followed by dress rehearsals on 20 and 21 May. This included the jury show on 20 May where the professional juries of each country watched and voted on the competing entries.

The Irish performance featured Molly Sterling performing together with two backing vocalists, a drummer, a bassist and a cellist who also performed backing vocals. The LED screens displayed a sunlit countryside scene in light brown colours. The backing vocalists that joined Molly Sterling on stage were Jessica Supple and Naomi Clarke, while the three musicians were: Jimmy Rainsford (drums), Darren Sweeney (bass) and Póilín Lynch (cello).

At the end of the show, Ireland was not announced among the top 10 entries in the second semi-final and therefore failed to qualify to compete in the final. It was later revealed that Ireland placed twelfth in the semi-final, receiving a total of 35 points.

=== Voting ===
Voting during the three shows consisted of 50 percent public televoting and 50 percent from a jury deliberation. The jury consisted of five music industry professionals who were citizens of the country they represent, with their names published before the contest to ensure transparency. This jury was asked to judge each contestant based on: vocal capacity; the stage performance; the song's composition and originality; and the overall impression by the act. In addition, no member of a national jury could be related in any way to any of the competing acts in such a way that they cannot vote impartially and independently. The individual rankings of each jury member were released shortly after the grand final.

Following the release of the full split voting by the EBU after the conclusion of the competition, it was revealed that Ireland had placed sixteenth with the public televote and seventh with the jury vote in the second semi-final. In the public vote, Ireland scored 14 points, while with the jury vote, Ireland scored 84 points.

Below is a breakdown of points awarded to Ireland and awarded by Ireland in the second semi-final and grand final of the contest, and the breakdown of the jury voting and televoting conducted during the two shows:

==== Points awarded to Ireland ====
Points awarded to Ireland (Semi-final 2)
Score	Country
12 points	
10 points	
8 points	United Kingdom
7 points	
6 points	
5 points	Czech Republic; San Marino
4 points	Latvia
3 points	Sweden
2 points	Azerbaijan; Germany; Lithuania; Montenegro
1 point	Cyprus; Slovenia

==== Points awarded by Ireland ====
Points awarded by Ireland (Semi-final 2)
Score	Country
12 points	Latvia
10 points	Sweden
8 points	Israel
7 points	Lithuania
6 points	Cyprus
5 points	Poland
4 points	Norway
3 points	Malta
2 points	Iceland
1 point	Czech Republic

Points awarded by Ireland (Final)
Score	Country
12 points	Latvia
10 points	Sweden
8 points	Russia
7 points	Lithuania
6 points	Italy
5 points	Australia
4 points	Norway
3 points	Poland
2 points	Belgium
1 point	United Kingdom

==== Detailed voting results ====
The following five members comprised the Irish jury:

- Raymond Smyth (jury chairperson) – composer, songwriter
- Bláthnaid Treacy – music/entertainment presenter
- Ryan Dolan – singer, songwriter, represented Ireland in the 2013 contest
- Ann Harrington – singer, songwriter
- Ray Harman – songwriter, composer, musician

Detailed voting results from Ireland (Semi-final 2)
R/O	Country	R. Smyth	B. Treacy	R. Dolan	A. Harrington	R. Harman	Jury Rank	Televote Rank	Combined Rank	Points
01	Lithuania	2	7	16	7	10	8	1	4	7
02	Ireland									
03	San Marino	3	16	12	15	16	15	16	16	
04	Montenegro	4	9	13	16	13	13	14	14	
05	Malta	5	2	2	5	9	4	12	8	3
06	Norway	16	8	6	4	4	6	7	7	4
07	Portugal	14	14	14	11	15	16	10	13	
08	Czech Republic	6	6	4	10	12	7	11	10	1
09	Israel	1	3	8	2	8	3	5	3	8
10	Latvia	11	1	1	6	2	2	3	1	12
11	Azerbaijan	13	15	9	9	11	14	15	15	
12	Iceland	10	12	5	12	7	9	9	9	2
13	Sweden	12	4	3	1	1	1	4	2	10
14	Switzerland	7	11	7	13	14	12	13	12	
15	Cyprus	15	5	11	3	3	5	6	5	6
16	Slovenia	9	13	15	8	5	11	8	11	
17	Poland	8	10	10	14	6	10	2	6	5

Detailed voting results from Ireland (Final)
R/O	Country	R. Smyth	B. Treacy	R. Dolan	A. Harrington	R. Harman	Jury Rank	Televote Rank	Combined Rank	Points
01	Slovenia	10	27	24	3	2	11	20	16	
02	France	11	11	19	21	26	19	25	24	
03	Israel	27	9	9	17	13	15	12	12	
04	Estonia	8	26	26	22	19	23	9	17	
05	United Kingdom	12	22	7	6	21	13	11	10	1
06	Armenia	21	23	27	27	27	27	27	27	
07	Lithuania	3	13	13	8	8	8	1	4	7
08	Serbia	13	24	15	23	20	21	14	21	
09	Norway	4	18	6	7	6	5	16	7	4
10	Sweden	9	2	4	2	1	1	5	2	10
11	Cyprus	2	8	12	9	11	6	18	11	
12	Australia	26	4	3	5	5	7	8	6	5
13	Belgium	25	3	11	11	24	14	10	9	2
14	Austria	16	5	20	16	9	10	22	19	
15	Greece	19	21	25	20	17	25	26	26	
16	Montenegro	18	14	22	26	10	20	23	23	
17	Germany	20	17	16	18	4	16	19	22	
18	Poland	14	20	21	19	22	22	2	8	3
19	Latvia	15	1	1	1	3	2	3	1	12
20	Romania	22	16	17	24	23	24	7	14	
21	Spain	23	19	8	15	15	18	13	15	
22	Hungary	6	15	14	14	18	12	17	13	
23	Georgia	17	12	18	13	16	17	15	18	
24	Azerbaijan	5	10	10	12	14	9	24	20	
25	Russia	1	7	2	10	7	3	4	3	8
26	Albania	24	25	23	25	25	26	21	25	
27	Italy	7	6	5	4	12	4	6	5	6
