= Football Icon =

- Genre: Sports
- Narrated by: Dave Kelly
- Country of origin: United Kingdom
- Original language: English
- No. of series: 2

Production
- Running time: 60mins (inc. adverts)
- Production company: North One

Original release
- Network: Sky One
- Release: 2005 – 2006

Related
- Football's Next Star

Football Icon is a British television programme aired on Sky One. The programme gave young, unsigned football players between the ages of 16 and 18 a chance to win a contract with the then Premiership champions, Chelsea. Thousands of players who entered were whittled down to fourteen finalists, all of whom were put to the test at their Cobham training ground. The players were eliminated week by week until only the final three remained, when then-manager José Mourinho and his staff selected a winner.

== Series 1 ==
The first series began in October 2005, and 5,000 young footballers across the UK took part. The series was won by Jaimie Ashley. In 2nd place was Jason Syrett. After five seasons in the youth team at Stamford Bridge, Jaimie left the Blues in the close season of 2011. He has gone on to play for semi-professional teams, Welling United, Worthing, Woking, Boreham Wood.

== Series 2 ==
The eventual winner was Carl Magnay. The series also included striker Moses Ademola.
