= Sunlight (Nicky Byrne album) =

Studio album by Nicky Byrne
- Released: 6 May 2016
- Recorded: 2016
- Genre: Pop
- Label: Universal Music
- Producer: Ronan Hardiman and Wayne Hector

Singles from Sunlight
- 1. "Sunlight" Released: 12 May 2016; 2. "Explosion" Released: 27 August 2016

Sunlight is the debut solo studio album by Irish singer Nicky Byrne. It was released on 6 May 2016 by Universal Music.

== Background ==
The development of Sunlight began around 2013, approximately one year after Westlife disbanded, and took about two years to complete. The project originated when Nicky Byrne was invited to contribute a song to the soundtrack of the film Love, Rosie, based on a novel by Cecelia Ahern. During this period, Byrne collaborated with producer Ronan Hardiman and songwriter Wayne Hector, with whom he co-wrote several tracks, including "Finishing Line" and "Sunlight". Additional material was later developed with Don Mescall, resulting in a full album recorded prior to Byrne securing a recording contract. The singer announced that he had signed his first solo recording contract with Universal in February 2016.

The album's composition process took place alongside Byrne's work as a radio presenter of RTÉ 2FM. It was created without time pressure, allowing Byrne to work closely with songwriters and producers on material tailored to his voice, unlike in the group where songs were often suited to other members like Shane Filan and Mark Feehily. The album followed a pop rock direction influenced by bands such as OneRepublic and Imagine Dragons. The title track was released as the lead single and was selected to represent Ireland in the Eurovision Song Contest. Byrne stated that parts of the album are autobiographical, including songs inspired by his personal life and his experiences in Westlife.

== Critical reception ==
Professional ratings
Review scores
Source	Rating
Entertainment Focus	3.5/5 stars

Entertainment Focus considered the album a "mixed bag", noting that Nicky Byrne "proves himself a capable vocalist" with a "distinctive" and slightly rock-edged tone, highlighting tracks like "Finishing Line" and "Explosion", and concluding that it is "a solid effort" for a debut that leaves "plenty of room to grow".

== Track listing ==
No.	Title	Writer(s)	Length
1.	"Sunlight"	Nicky Byrne, Ronan Hardiman, Wayne Hector	3:40
2.	"Explosion"	N. Byrne, R. Hardiman, Don Mescall	4:19
3.	"Song for Lovers"	N. Byrne, R. Hardiman, W. Hector	3:24
4.	"Pop Machine"	N. Byrne, R. Hardiman, D. Mescall	3:57
5.	"Still the One"	N. Byrne, R. Hardiman, D. Mescall	3:48
6.	"Some Things Always Seem to Last"	N. Byrne, R. Hardiman, W. Hector	3:16
7.	"Finishing Line"	N. Byrne, R. Hardiman, W. Hector	3:50
8.	"Broadway Show"	N. Byrne, R. Hardiman, D. Mescall	3:12
9.	"Thank You"	N. Byrne, R. Hardiman, D. Mescall	4:35
10.	"Pretty"	N. Byrne, R. Hardiman, D. Mescall	2:54
Total length:			36:55

== Credits ==
- Licensed To – Universal Music Ireland
- Phonographic Copyright (p) – Studz Limited
- Manufactured By – EDC, Germany
- Lead Vocals, Backing Vocals, Written-By – Nicky Byrne
- Management – Tim Byrne (2)
- Mastered By – Alex Wharton (tracks: 2 to 10), Tom Coyne (tracks: 1)
- Mixed By – Greg French (tracks: 2 to 10), Serban Ghenea (tracks: 1)
- Photography By – Lili Forberg
- Producer, Arranged By, Recorded By, Mixed By, Keyboards, Programmed By, Written-By – Ronan Hardiman (tracks: 2 to 10)
- Written-By – Don Mescall (tracks: 2, 4, 5, 8, 9, 10), Wayne Hector (tracks: 1, 3, 6, 7)
- Barcode: 6 02547 89319 2
- Mastering SID Code: IFPI LV26
- Mould SID Code: IFPI 0139
- Matrix / Runout: 06025 478 931-9 01 + 53948157
- Label Code: LC01846

== Charts ==
Weekly chart performance for Sunlight
Chart (2016)	Peak position
Irish Albums (IRMA)	8
Scottish Albums (OCC)	65
UK Albums (OCC)	114
UK Albums Sales (OCC)	72
