= Playing with Numbers =

2015 song by Molly Sterling

Single by Molly Sterling
- Released: 3 April 2015
- Length: 3:01
- Label: Lunar
- Songwriters: Molly Sterling; Greg French
- Producers: Molly Sterling; Greg French

Molly Sterling singles chronology
"Playing with Numbers" (2015)	"Fake the Cost" (2015)

Music video
- "Playing with Numbers" on YouTube

Eurovision Song Contest 2015 entry
- Country: Ireland
- Artist: Molly Sterling
- Language: English
- Composers: Molly Sterling; Greg French
- Lyricists: Molly Sterling; Greg French

Finals performance
- Semi-final result: 12th
- Semi-final points: 35

Entry chronology
- ◄ "Heartbeat" (2014)
- "Sunlight" (2016) ►

Official performance video
- "Playing with Numbers" (Second Semi-Final) on YouTube

"Playing with Numbers" is a song performed by Irish singer-songwriter Molly Sterling. Self-described as a song that takes the perspective of one who took "risks that [they] really believed would pay off and [later] reflecting on the consequences of that gamble that went wrong in life or love", the song was written and lyrically composed by Sterling and The Brilliant Things member Greg French. It was released on 3 April 2015 by Lunar Records. The song was the Irish entry at the Eurovision Song Contest 2015, held in Vienna, where it failed to qualify from the second semi-final, finishing in 12th place out of 17 entries in the second semi-final, two spots away from a qualification spot.

Critical response of the song was positive, especially from local Irish media. The song was described by Irish television personality Marty Whelan as "really great", stating his belief that the song had potential to get a good result at the Eurovision Song Contest.

== Background and composition ==
The song was written by Sterling and Greg French, the latter being a band member for Irish synthpop band The Brilliant Things. According to Sterling, who was 16 years old when she wrote the song, wanted to express that "teenagers [can] feel just as much hurt as others". In a Wiwibloggs interview, she described the song as from the perspective of a character who took "risks that [they] really believed would pay off and [later] reflecting on the consequences of that gamble that went wrong in life or love". However, Sterling has also stated in other interviews that she believes the song's lyrics should be open to interpretation.

The song was officially announced to compete in Eurosong 2015 and later premiered on 9 February 2015 on a radio broadcast of The Ray D'Arcy Show. At the national final on 27 February, the song performed fifth out of fifth entries, winning the competition. The song was later revamped and released as a digital download on 3 April, with the digital download version adding a new orchestral accompaniment to the song.

== Critical reception ==
In a Wiwibloggs review containing several reviews from individual critics, the song was given a score of 6.07 out of 10 points, ranking it 24th out of the 40th entries ranked by Wiwibloggs that year. Another review by ESCUnited that also contained several reviews from individual critics gave the song a score of 33 out of 60 points.

The song received relative praise from the Irish media. Irish television and radio presenter Marty Whelan praised the song, stating that, "I think we could do well this year... The song is really great this year and it's a proper act." Irish Examiner writer Karl Fradgley stated that the song was "one of [Ireland's] best entries to date... I would not be surprised to see Molly go top ten in the [grand] final."

The Eurovision performance of the song also received praise from both Irish media and personalities. Ireland's entrant for the Eurovision Song Contest 2008, Dustin the Turkey, expressed disappointment at the song's non-qualification from the semi-final, later tweeting hashtags that stated, "~~#~~EuroNoVision ~~#~~TooGoodForThemMolly".

== Eurovision Song Contest ==
=== Eurosong 2015 ===
Ireland's broadcaster Raidió Teilifís Éireann (RTÉ) organized a five-entry competition, Eurosong 2015 with a singular grand final held on 27 February 2015 to select its entrant for the Eurovision Song Contest 2015. The edition was the eighth iteration of the national final. The winning song in the final was selected via a 50/50 combination of jury and public voting during an episode of Irish talk host Ryan Tubridy'sThe Late Late Show.

"Playing with Numbers" was announced to compete in Eurosong 2015 and premiered on 9 February 2015 on an episode of The Ray D'Arcy Show that was broadcast on RTÉ Radio 1. It was drawn to perform fifth. The performance on The Late Late Show was stationary, with Sterling playing piano while singing, with two female backing singers and a male guitarist to her left, a drummer behind her, and a cellist to her right amongst a yellow, sparkly background. In the grand final, Sterling came third with the juries, scoring 44 points. However, she managed to win the televote with 60 points, putting her four points ahead of runner-up Kat Mahon, winning the Irish spot for the Eurovision Song Contest 2015 and in the process, becoming Ireland's youngest ever contestant to compete in the Eurovision Song Contest.

After her victory, Sterling stated in an interview with The Irish Mirror that she hoped to not make any changes to the song. In addition, she also stated that a part of her victory came from a piano stool that she had brought from her home, stuffing the stool with "good luck cards and a CD mix".

=== At Eurovision ===
The Eurovision Song Contest 2015 took place at the Wiener Stadthalle in Vienna, Austria and consisted of two semi-finals held on 19 and 21 May, respectively, and the final on 23 May 2015. According to Eurovision rules, all countries, except the host and the "Big Five" (France, Germany, Italy, Spain, and the United Kingdom), were required to qualify from one semi-final to compete in the final; the top ten countries from each semi-final progressed to the final. In a press conference held on 26 January 2015, a special allocation press conference was held to determine which countries would perform in each semi-final. Ireland was placed into the second semi-final, performing in the first half of the show.

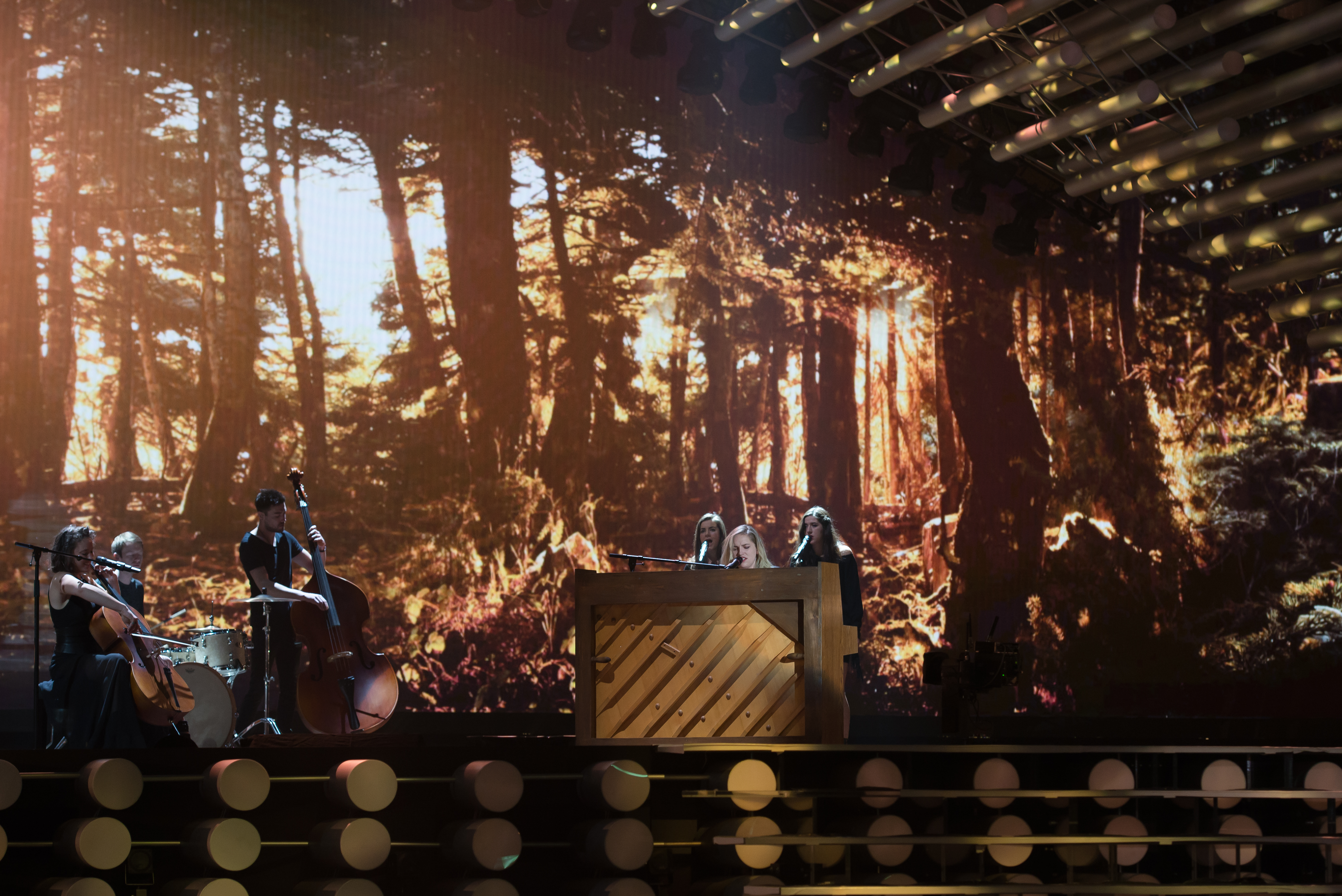
Sterling performing "Playing with Numbers" at a Eurovision rehearsal.

For its Eurovision performance, the performance, team, and song itself were unchanged with the exception of the background, which now resembled a forest. The song was drawn to perform second, after Lithuania's duo of Monika Linkytė and Vaidas Baumila and before San Marino's duo of Anita Simoncini and Michele Perniola. The song failed to qualify from the second semi-final, not being announced as one of the 10 countries that qualified for the grand final. When full semi-split results were released, the song was revealed to have scored 35 points, securing 12th place. No country gave the song 12 points; the maximum given to the song was eight, given by the United Kingdom. In reaction to her result, she stated no animosity at her non-qualification, stating, "I've had the time of my life. To be in the final would have been a bonus but the Eurovision is a bit of a lottery so you just never know how it’s going to go. Representing my country has been a privilege and I hope I did everyone proud."

== Track listing ==
- Digital download (Note: This acts as a summary of all versions of the song released for digital download.)
1. "Playing with Numbers" – 3:00
2. "Playing with Numbers (Karaoke)" – 2:59

== Chart performance ==
=== Weekly charts ===
Chart (2015)	Peak position
Ireland (IRMA)	77

== Release history ==
Country	Date	Format(s)	Label	Ref.
Various	3 April 2015	Digital download	Lunar Records	
