= Sunlight (Nicky Byrne song) =

2016 song by Nicky Byrne

Single by Nicky Byrne

from the album Sunlight
- Released: 12 May 2016
- Genre: Dance-pop
- Length: 3:40 (original version); 3:00 (Eurovision version)
- Label: Studz Limited; Universal Music Ireland
- Songwriters: Nicky Byrne; Wayne Hector; Ronan Hardiman
- Producers: Nicky Byrne; Wayne Hector; Ronan Hardiman

Nicky Byrne singles chronology
"Sunlight" (2016)	"Explosion" (2016)

Music video
- "Sunlight" on YouTube

Eurovision Song Contest 2016 entry
- Country: Ireland

Finals performance
- Semi-final result: 15th
- Semi-final points: 46

Entry chronology
- ◄ "Playing with Numbers" (2015)
- "Dying to Try" (2017) ►

Official performance video
- "Sunlight (Second Semi-Final) on YouTube

"Sunlight" is the debut solo single by Irish singer Nicky Byrne. The song represented Ireland in the Eurovision Song Contest 2016 held in Stockholm, Sweden after being internally selected by RTÉ, the Irish broadcaster for the Eurovision Song Contest. The song did not qualify for that year's Grand Final, only earning 46 points, managing a 15th-place finish in the first semi-final.

== Composition ==
According to Byrne, "Sunlight" is "essentially a love song and its message is one of positivity. Tomorrow is a new day and the sunlight shining on your face at the start of any new day should make you smile be fresh and to begin again." In producing the song, Byrne would imagine himself walking up a mountain, breaking through clouds in order to catch the view.

== Eurovision Song Contest ==
=== Selection ===
On 13 January 2016, the broadcaster announced that they had internally selected Nicky Byrne to represent Ireland in Stockholm. Byrne was a former member of the Irish boy band Westlife and had previously been the Irish spokesperson at the Eurovision Song Contest, revealing the results of the Irish vote between 2013 and 2015. Unconfirmed rumours of Byrne's selection as the Irish contestant were published by Irish media earlier on 7 January 2016. RTÉ selected Nicky and the song "Sunlight" in a departure from the Eurosong format and the mentor format which it has done in the previous eight years, with the last time RTÉ picking the participant internally in 2007, when Irish folk band Dervish with "They Can't Stop The Spring" finished last. John McHugh, Head of Entertainment RTÉ Television, said, "We have a long and proud history with Eurovision, but we've had mixed results over the last few years. Myself and Head of Delegation Michael Kealy took a serious look at our approach, reviewing the entire process and the Eurovision Song Contest itself. The competition is constantly evolving and RTÉ has to be flexible in how we approach it in order to put our best foot forward. Direct selection has proven to be a successful method for other countries and we felt that this year it would give us the best chance at success". Speaking about "Sunlight" to be performed by Nicky Byrne, John said, "First and foremost, it's a great song, written by an internationally renowned team, and with Nicky's massive breadth of performance experience, along with his huge fan-base and profile throughout Europe, it's a really impactful package".

Along with the announcement of Byrne as the participant for Ireland, a lyric video for "Sunlight" was officially released to the public.

=== Promotion ===
Bryne would first perform the song live on 13 February 2016 on The Ray D'Arcy Show.

In an effort to promote the song, Byrne would go on an extensive traveling schedule, performing "Sunlight" in various European countries. On 21 February 2016, Nicky Byrne performed "Sunlight" during the final of the Ukrainian Eurovision national selection. On 17 April, Byrne performed during the London Eurovision Party, which was held at the Café de Paris venue in London, United Kingdom.

=== At Eurovision ===
According to Eurovision rules, all nations with the exceptions of the host country and the "Big Five" (France, Germany, Italy, Spain and the United Kingdom) are required to qualify from one of two semi-finals in order to compete for the final; the top ten countries from each semi-final progress to the final. The European Broadcasting Union (EBU) split up the competing countries into six different pots based on voting patterns from previous contests, with countries with favourable voting histories put into the same pot. On 25 January 2016, a special allocation draw was held which placed each country into one of the two semi-finals, as well as which half of the show they would perform in. Ireland was placed into the second semi-final, to be held on 12 May 2016, and was scheduled to perform in the first half of the show. Once all the competing songs for the 2016 contest had been released, the running order for the semi-finals was decided by the shows' producers rather than through another draw, so that similar songs were not placed next to each other. Ireland was set to perform in position 7, following the entry from Serbia and before the entry from Macedonia.

Before Eurovision, the song was a heavy favorite to win the contest, or at the very least qualify from the second semi-final. Eurovision fansite Wiwibloggs reported that it was the fan favorite of the second semi-final, earning the most votes in a fan poll. Days before the second semi-final, the Irish Mirror reported that while the song had decreased as a favorite to win, with 100/1 odds of winning, it was a solid qualifier, earning 3/1 odds to qualify from the semi-final.

The Eurovision performance of "Sunlight" featured a band set-up with Nicky Byrne performing together with a drummer, keyboard player and guitarist who were on raised platforms. The LED screens displayed bright red patterns and fireball images of the sun with the stage lighting in red and white. Byrne was joined on stage by five backing vocalists, some of which were also playing instruments: Janet Grogan, Jay Boland, Ian White, Jennifer Healy and Johan Sundvall.

At the end of the show, Ireland was not announced among the top 10 entries in the second semi-final and therefore failed to qualify to compete in the final. It was later revealed that Ireland placed fifteenth in the semi-final, receiving a total of 46 points: 31 points from the televoting and 15 points from the juries. Byrne would express major disappointment and anger at the result, stating that politics and a self-quoted "Eurovision mafia" had a part in the year's results. He expressed that despite intense promotion of the song and being a heavy favorite pre-Eurovision, that "I think there’s no formula to winning. I think there’s a big Eurovision mafia that are planning next year’s Eurovision now, and certainly come January they’re looking at what countries are going to do what. And somehow – and I don’t know how you do it because I was talking to Linda Martin about this the other day – you need to get into that top five or top ten with the Eurovision hardcore fans from the start."

== Track listing ==
Digital download
No.	Title	Length
1.	"Sunlight" (Radio Edit)	2:59
2.	"Sunlight"	3:38
3.	"Sunlight" (Instrumental)	3:38

7th Heaven Remix Single
No.	Title	Length
1.	"Sunlight" (7th Heaven Radio Edit)	3:57
2.	"Sunlight" (7th Heaven Club Mix)	6:12

== Charts ==
Chart (2016)	Peak position
Ireland (IRMA)	68
Ireland Download (GfK Chart-Track)	13

== Release history ==
Region	Date	Format	Label
Worldwide	12 February 2016	Digital download	Studz Limited; Universal Music Ireland
