= Runaway GO =

Northern Irish indie pop band

- Also known as: Kagura, Phoenix Fire
- Origin: Belfast, Northern Ireland
- Genre: Indie pop
- Years active: 2011 – 2015
- Members: Christopher Jackson; James Lappin; David Jackson; Fiona O'Kane
- Website: www.runawaygo.com

Runaway GO were a Northern Irish indie pop band formed in 2011. They have self-released six singles to date with the latest, "I Would Go", was released in October 2013.

== History ==
=== Formation and early years (2006-2011) ===
Chris Jackson, and James Lappin initially formed the band, initially under the name Kagura, in 2006. Fiona O'Kane was subsequently asked to front the group and was later joined by school friend David Jackson after he impressed with his vocal harmonies. Kagura performed sporadically at local venues in Belfast and released two well-received demo EPs in 2007 and 2009.

The band's early successes included reaching the finals of the JD Set Unsigned and Road to V competitions in 2007 and performing showcase gigs for Channel 4 in both instances.

A period of transition from 2010 to 2011 saw the band change name twice, performing for a short time under the moniker Phoenix Fire before settling on Runaway GO.

=== Runaway GO ===
After recording the tracks for what would later become the Runaway GO EP, the band decided that their music was taking a new direction, one which was not best represented by their current name. Following some deliberation, they decided to re-emerge as Runaway GO for the release of their debut single, "Alligator", in August 2011.

All of the tracks on the Runaway GO EP, were recorded at Start Together Studios in Belfast, mixed by Jonathan Shakhovskoy (Beady Eye, U2, Stereophonics) and mastered at Abbey Road by Geoff Pesche.

"Alligator" and the second single, "Delicate Man", were well received by both the widespread national press and the music critique community. Both singles received significant airplay on national radio stations such as BBC Radio One (BBC Introducing with Rory McConnell) and also on popular local stations in their native Northern Ireland (Cool FM, CityBeat, U105), a trend which would continue through all of the band's subsequent releases. The band's third single, "Electric", released in conjunction with the debut EP, achieved greater success with national radio. The Runaway GO EP was launched in conjunction with Gifted Live at a sold-out show in Belfast's Empire Music Hall on 29 March 2012. The gig was streamed online in HD, the first of its kind in Ireland to have done so since the U2 360° Tour.

"Jump Start" was recorded in August 2012 at Start Together Studios with Shakhovskoy returning to produce. It was released on 8 October 2012, accompanied by a successful video and re-designed website designed to tie in with the band's current promotional campaign. A further single from the Shakhovskoy sessions, "This Is Real", was released in February 2013 with a similar campaign. Runaway GO's debut album was expected to follow in the summer.

In August 2013, the band were announced as the main support for Bastille on their sold-out Irish tour, including dates at the Ulster Hall and Olympia Theatre in Belfast and Dublin.

As of December 2013, the band headed into the studio with producer Mike Mormecha to begin recording their debut album, Alive, which debuted in November of 2015.

== Musical style and influences ==
Drawing widespread influence from artists such as Coldplay, Jeff Buckley, Snow Patrol, The Frames, and Elbow, it is perhaps a little too easy to label Runaway GO as an "indie" band. However, as many journalists have pointed out, while the band may indeed wear these influences on their sleeves, they also have one eye firmly fixed on pop music. This has led to them being firmly categorized as indie pop, a description which the band themselves are more than happy to adopt.

== Personnel ==
- Christopher Jackson - Bass
- James Lappin - Guitars
- Fiona O'Kane - Vocals, Guitars
- David Jackson - Vocals, Percussion

== Discography ==
=== Albums ===
- Alive (November 2015)

=== EPs ===
- Runaway GO EP (April 2012)

=== Singles ===
- "Jump Start" (October 2012)
- "This Is Real" (February 2013)

== Awards/press ==
- Finalists - JD Set Unsigned 2007
- Finalist - Road to V 2007
- 'A must see' - Irish Times
- 'Watching this band is a rare spectacle: they play with sophisticated confidence; they sing with passion; they embrace their audience with humility, and they love every second of it' - BBC NI (ATL)
- 'One of the bands to watch in 2012' - Hot Press

== Sync ==
- Making Ugly - Independent Horror Film - 'Don't Let Me' (unreleased track).

== Tours ==
=== Ireland ===
- Delicate Man Tour - Nov/Dec 2011
- Electric Tour - April 2012
- Jump Start Tour - Nov/Dec 2012
