= Serbia in the Eurovision Song Contest 2021 =

- Eurovision Song Contest 2021
- Participating broadcaster: Radio Television of Serbia (RTS)
- Country: Serbia
- Selection process: Internal selection
- Announcement date: Artist: 17 December 2020; Song: 5 March 2021

Competing entry
- Song: "Loco loco"
- Artist: Hurricane
- Songwriters: Nemanja Antonić; Sanja Vučić; Darko Dimitrov

Placement
- Semi-final result: Qualified (8th, 124 points)
- Final result: 15th, 102 points

Participation chronology

Serbia was represented at the Eurovision Song Contest 2021 with the song "Loco loco" written by Nemanja Antonić, Sanja Vučić and Darko Dimitrov. The song was performed by the group Hurricane, which were internally selected by the Serbian national broadcaster, Radio Television of Serbia (RTS) to represent Serbia in the 2021 contest in Rotterdam, Netherlands. Among the members of the group included Sanja Vučić who had previously represented Serbia in the Eurovision Song Contest in 2016 where she placed eighteenth with the song "Goodbye (Shelter)". Hurricane was announced as the Serbian representative on 17 December 2020 after they were due to compete in the 2020 contest with "Hasta la vista" before the event's cancellation, while the song, "Loco loco", was presented on 5 March 2021.

Serbia was drawn to compete in the second semi-final of the Eurovision Song Contest which took place on 20 May 2021. Performing during the show in position 9, "Loco loco" was announced among the top 10 entries of the second semi-final and therefore qualified to compete in the final on 22 May. It was later revealed that Serbia placed eighth out of the 17 participating countries in the semi-final with 124 points. In the final, Serbia performed in position 8 and placed fifteenth out of the 26 participating countries, scoring 102 points.

== Background ==
Prior to the 2021 contest, Serbia had participated in the Eurovision Song Contest as an independent nation twelve times since its first entry in 2007, winning the contest with their debut entry "Molitva" performed by Marija Šerifović. Since 2007, nine out of twelve of Serbia's entries have featured in the final with the nation failing to qualify in 2009, 2013 and 2017. Serbia's 2019 entry "Kruna" performed by Nevena Božović qualified to the final and placed eighteenth.

The Serbian national broadcaster, Radio Television of Serbia (RTS), broadcasts the event within Serbia and organises the selection process for the nation's entry. RTS confirmed their intentions to participate at the 2020 Eurovision Song Contest on 25 July 2019. Between 2007 and 2009, Serbia used the Beovizija national final in order to select their entry. However, after their 2009 entry, "Cipela" performed by Marko Kon and Milaan, failed to qualify Serbia to the final, the broadcaster shifted their selection strategy to selecting specific composers to create songs for artists. In 2010, RTS selected Goran Bregović to compose songs for a national final featuring three artists, while in 2011 Kornelije Kovač, Aleksandra Kovač and Kristina Kovač were tasked with composing one song each. In 2012, the internal selection of Željko Joksimović and the song "Nije ljubav stvar" secured the country's second highest placing in the contest to this point, placing third. In 2013, RTS returned to an open national final format and organized the Beosong competition. The winning entry, "Ljubav je svuda" performed by Moje 3, failed to qualify Serbia to the final at the Eurovision Song Contest 2013. In 2015, RTS selected Vladimir Graić, the composer of Serbia's 2007 Eurovision Song Contest winning entry "Molitva", to compose songs for a national final featuring three artists. RTS internally selected the Serbian entries in 2016 and 2017 with the decision made by RTS music editors. Since 2018, RTS returned to using the Beovizija national final in order to select their entry, managing to qualify every year to the final since.

== Before Eurovision ==
=== Internal selection ===
The group Hurricane was confirmed by RTS on 17 December 2020 as the artist to represent Serbia at the Eurovision Song Contest 2021. Despite initial plans of organizing a national final, RTS ultimately internally selected the song Hurricane would perform at the Eurovision Song Contest and would be titled "Loco loco", written by Nemanja Antonić, Darko Dimitrov and Hurricane member Sanja Vučić who represented Serbia in the Eurovision Song Contest 2016. "Loco loco" was presented through the release of the official music video, directed by Dejan Milićević, via the official Eurovision Song Contest's YouTube channel on 5 March 2021.

== At Eurovision ==
According to Eurovision rules, all nations with the exceptions of the host country and the "Big Five" (France, Germany, Italy, Spain and the United Kingdom) are required to qualify from one of two semi-finals in order to compete for the final; the top ten countries from each semi-final progress to the final. The European Broadcasting Union (EBU) split up the competing countries into six different pots based on voting patterns from previous contests, with countries with favourable voting histories put into the same pot. The semi-final allocation draw held for the Eurovision Song Contest 2020 on 28 January 2020 was used for the 2021 contest, which Serbia was placed into the second semi-final, to be held on 20 May 2021, and was scheduled to perform in the first half of the show.

Once all the competing songs for the 2021 contest had been released, the running order for the semi-finals was decided by the shows' producers rather than through another draw, so that similar songs were not placed next to each other. Serbia was set to perform in position 9, following the entry from Iceland and before the entry from Georgia.

The two semi-finals and the final were broadcast in Serbia on RTS1, RTS Svet and RTS Planeta with commentary by Duška Vučinić. The final was also broadcast via radio on Radio Belgrade 1 with commentary by Nikoleta Dojčinović and Katarina Epštajn. The Serbian spokesperson, who announced the top 12-point score awarded by the Serbian jury during the final, was Dragana Kosjerina.

=== Semi-final ===
Hurricane took part in technical rehearsals on 10 and 13 May, followed by dress rehearsals on 19 and 20 May. This included the jury show on 19 May where the professional juries of each country watched and voted on the competing entries.

The Serbian performance featured the members of Hurricane performing a dance routine both on the main stage and satellite stage. The stage lighting predominately displayed red, black and white colours with the background LED screens displaying the song title "Loco loco" in black and white. The performance also featured pyrotechnic effects. The director of the Serbian performance was Miodrag Kolarić and the choreography was completed by Milan Gromilić. Hurricane were joined by three off-stage backing vocalists: Olga Popović, Jelena Pajić and Mladen Lukić. Lukić had previously represented Serbia in the Eurovision Song Contest 2018 as part of the group Balkanika. The black stage costumes for the performance were designed by designer Boris Kargotić.

At the end of the show, Serbia was announced as having finished in the top 10 and subsequently qualifying for the grand final. It was later revealed that Serbia placed eighth in the semi-final, receiving a total of 124 points: 68 points from the televoting and 56 points from the juries.

=== Final ===
Shortly after the second semi-final, a winners' press conference was held for the ten qualifying countries. As part of this press conference, the qualifying artists took part in a draw to determine which half of the grand final they would subsequently participate in. This draw was done in the order the countries were announced during the semi-final. Serbia was drawn to compete in the second half. Following this draw, the shows' producers decided upon the running order of the final, as they had done for the semi-finals. Serbia was subsequently placed to perform in position 8, following the entry from Portugal and before the entry from United Kingdom.

Hurricane once again took part in dress rehearsals on 21 and 22 May before the final, including the jury final where the professional juries cast their final votes before the live show. Hurricane performed a repeat of their semi-final performance during the final on 22 May. Serbia placed fifteenth in the final, scoring 102 points: 82 points from the televoting and 20 points from the juries.

=== Voting ===
Voting during the three shows involved each country awarding two sets of points from 1–8, 10 and 12: one from their professional jury and the other from televoting. Each nation's jury consisted of five music industry professionals who are citizens of the country they represent. This jury judged each entry based on: vocal capacity; the stage performance; the song's composition and originality; and the overall impression by the act. In addition, each member of a national jury may only take part in the panel once every three years, and no jury was permitted to discuss of their vote with other members or be related in any way to any of the competing acts in such a way that they cannot vote impartially and independently. The individual rankings of each jury member in an anonymised form as well as the nation's televoting results were released shortly after the grand final.

Below is a breakdown of points awarded to Serbia and awarded by Serbia in the second semi-final and grand final of the contest, and the breakdown of the jury voting and televoting conducted during the two shows:

==== Points awarded to Serbia ====
Points awarded to Serbia (Semi-final 2)
Score	Televote	Jury
12 points	Austria; Switzerland	
10 points	Bulgaria	
8 points		
7 points	France; San Marino	
6 points		Austria
5 points	Czech Republic	Albania; Estonia; France; United Kingdom
4 points	Albania; Greece	Czech Republic; Portugal; San Marino; Spain; Switzerland
3 points		Finland; Greece
2 points	Portugal; Spain	Georgia; Iceland
1 point	Georgia; Moldova; Poland	

Points awarded to Serbia (Final)
Score	Televote	Jury
12 points	Austria; Croatia; North Macedonia; Slovenia; Switzerland	North Macedonia
10 points		
8 points		
7 points		Croatia
6 points		
5 points	Bulgaria	
4 points	Italy; Malta	
3 points	France; Germany	
2 points	Australia	
1 point	Sweden	Albania

==== Points awarded by Serbia ====
Points awarded by Serbia (Semi-final 2)
Score	Televote	Jury
12 points	Moldova	Iceland
10 points	Finland	Bulgaria
8 points	Greece	Greece
7 points	Iceland	Portugal
6 points	Bulgaria	Finland
5 points	Switzerland	Switzerland
4 points	Portugal	Moldova
3 points	San Marino	Austria
2 points	Denmark	San Marino
1 point	Albania	Estonia

Points awarded by Serbia (Final)
Score	Televote	Jury
12 points	Italy	France
10 points	France	Finland
8 points	Ukraine	Italy
7 points	Finland	Iceland
6 points	Russia	Bulgaria
5 points	Iceland	Portugal
4 points	Azerbaijan	Sweden
3 points	Greece	Greece
2 points	Cyprus	Israel
1 point	Switzerland	Switzerland

==== Detailed voting results ====
The following members comprised the Serbian jury:

- Snežana Berić (Extra Nena)
- Tijana Bogićević
- Slobodan Marković
- Ivana Peters
- Milan Stanković

Detailed voting results from Serbia (Semi-final 2)
R/O	Country	Jury							Televote	
R/O	Country	Juror A	Juror B	Juror C	Juror D	Juror E	Rank	Points	Rank	Points
01	San Marino	12	7	2	11	6	9	2	8	3
02	Estonia	11	5	10	10	7	10	1	13	
03	Czech Republic	13	13	13	13	9	14		12	
04	Greece	4	3	8	7	2	3	8	3	8
05	Austria	5	11	6	3	10	8	3	14	
06	Poland	6	12	11	14	13	13		15	
07	Moldova	3	4	14	6	11	7	4	1	12
08	Iceland	10	10	1	2	1	1	12	4	7
09	Serbia									
10	Georgia	14	16	15	16	14	15		16	
11	Albania	7	14	5	8	15	11		10	1
12	Portugal	2	6	9	4	4	4	7	7	4
13	Bulgaria	1	2	3	12	5	2	10	5	6
14	Finland	8	8	7	1	3	5	6	2	10
15	Latvia	9	9	12	9	12	12		11	
16	Switzerland	15	1	4	5	8	6	5	6	5
17	Denmark	16	15	16	15	16	16		9	2

Detailed voting results from Serbia (Final)
R/O	Country	Jury							Televote	
R/O	Country	Juror A	Juror B	Juror C	Juror D	Juror E	Rank	Points	Rank	Points
01	Cyprus	20	18	22	25	15	22		9	2
02	Albania	23	21	17	20	23	23		11	
03	Israel	22	13	8	3	7	9	2	20	
04	Belgium	18	22	23	22	22	24		21	
05	Russia	19	17	7	14	13	17		5	6
06	Malta	10	5	10	11	11	11		16	
07	Portugal	3	8	19	4	16	6	5	19	
08	Serbia									
09	United Kingdom	6	23	11	6	17	14		24	
10	Greece	4	14	15	7	6	8	3	8	3
11	Switzerland	24	15	3	8	10	10	1	10	1
12	Iceland	11	12	4	2	2	4	7	6	5
13	Spain	12	24	20	10	25	19		23	
14	Moldova	5	20	24	16	18	16		22	
15	Germany	17	25	25	24	24	25		18	
16	Finland	2	4	14	1	4	2	10	4	7
17	Bulgaria	1	7	9	19	8	5	6	12	
18	Lithuania	21	10	18	17	14	18		13	
19	Ukraine	25	11	2	23	12	12		3	8
20	France	8	1	1	5	3	1	12	2	10
21	Azerbaijan	13	19	12	21	20	20		7	4
22	Norway	14	6	21	13	9	15		17	
23	Netherlands	15	16	16	18	21	21		25	
24	Italy	7	3	6	9	1	3	8	1	12
25	Sweden	16	2	13	15	5	7	4	14	
26	San Marino	9	9	5	12	19	13		15	
