= Marković =

Marković (Serbian Cyrillic: Марковић, pronounced [mǎːrkoʋitɕ]) is a common family name in Bosnia and Herzegovina, Croatia, Montenegro, Austria and Serbia. It is a patronym of Marko, the local variant of the common European name "Marcus" or "Mark".

Marković is the fourth most frequent surname in Serbia, and the tenth most frequent surname in Croatia.

Notable people with the surname include:

- Aleksandar Marković (conductor) (born 1975), Serbian conductor
- Ante Marković (1924–2011), Croatian politician, Prime Minister of SFR Yugoslavia 1989–1991
- Antun Marković (born 1992), Croatian footballer
- Boban Marković, Serbian Roma trumpet player and leader of a brass music ensemble
- Bogoljub Marković (born 2005), Serbian basketball player
- Brigitte Markovic, Australian judge
- Dragan Marković (born 1960), or Palma, Serbian politician, president of the United Serbia political party
- Dragan Marković (handballer) (born 1969), German-Bosnian handballer
- Dragoslav Marković (1920–2005), or Draza, Serbian communist politician, president and prime minister of Serbia
- Duško Marković (born 1958), Montenegrin politician, Prime Minister of Montenegro 2016–2020
- Filip Marković (born 1992), Serbian footballer, brother of Lazar
- Franjo Marković (1845–1914), Croatian philosopher and writer
- Goran Marković (born 1946), Serbian film director
- Goran Marković (footballer) (1986–2019), Serbian footballer
- Gordana Marković (born 1951), Serbian chess master
- Ivan Marković, multiple people
- Ivana Dulić-Marković (born 1961), Serbian Minister of Agriculture, Forestry, and Water Management 2004–2006
- Lazar Marković (born 1994), Serbian footballer, brother of Filip
- Marjan Marković (born 1981), Serbian footballer
- Marko Marković (1935–2011), Serbian sports journalist
- Mihailo Marković (1923–2010), Serbian philosopher
- Milovan Destil Marković (born 1957) Serbian contemporary artist
- Mirjana Marković (1942–2019), Serbian politician, widow of Slobodan Milošević
- Moma Marković (Momčilo Marković, 1912–1992), Serbian communist politician, father of Mirjana
- Nina Marković, Croatian physicist and professor
- Olivera Marković (1925–2011), Serbian actress
- Pavo Marković, Croatian water polo player
- Predrag Marković (born 1955), Serbian politician, acting president of Serbia for few months in 2004
- Radomir Marković (born 1948), Serbian security operative, former head of the State Security Service (RDB)
- Stefan Marković, several people named Stefan Marković or Stevan Marković
- Svetozar Marković (1846–1875), 19th century Serbian socialist politician
- Vanja Marković (born 1994), Serbian footballer
- Vasilije Marković (born 2008), Austrian footballer
- Vlatko Marković (1937–2013) president of the Croatian Football Federation 1999–2012
- Zvonko Marković, Serbian fashion designer

== See also ==
- Surnames derived from the name Mark
- Markovići
- Marković Selo
