= Ksenija Knežević =

Serbian singer (born 1996)

Ksenija Knežević Ксенија Кнежевић
- Knežević at Beovizija 2020

Background information
- Born: 24 January 1996 (age 30); Belgrade, Serbia, FR Yugoslavia
- Genres: R&B; pop; electronic
- Occupation: Singer
- Instrument: Vocals
- Labels: Stema Production; Kseniart

Ksenija Knežević (Serbian Cyrillic: Ксенија Кнежевић, pronounced [ksêːnija kněːʒeʋitɕ]; born 24 January 1996), also known mononym as Ksenia (stylised in all caps) is a Montenegrin singer. She rose to prominence after her collaborations with Serbian DJ and singer SevdahBaby. Knežević provided the backing vocals for her father's Nenad Knezević song "Adio", which was selected to represent Montenegro at the Eurovision Song Contest 2015. From 2017 to 2022 she was a member of Serbian pop folk girl group Hurricane, during which time they represented Serbia in the Eurovision Song Contest 2020 and 2021 with the songs "Hasta la vista" and "Loco loco".

== Life and career ==
=== Early career ===
Born into a reasonably wealthy family, with her father Nenad Knezević being the Popstar of the Balkans and her mother Ninoslava Knezevic whom works as a model, she also has a sister named Andrea At the age of six, she recorded her first song, named "Šarene laže" (Colorful Lies). The song was added to the CD compilation "Zvezde pevaju za decu" (Stars sing for children). She attended the UMS school for talents and participated in various children's festivals. In 2006, she participated with her song "Čarolija" (Magic) in the competition of the same name. She also participated in the festivals "Niški susreti", "Pop Rock Kids" and others.

In 2013, she was revealed as one of the members of the group Sky's. The group participated in the Serbian national selection for the Eurovision Song Contest 2013, Beosong, with the song "Magija" (Magic), where they placed fifth in the grand final.

=== Eurovision Song Contest 2015 ===
Knežević's father, Nenad Knezević Knez, was selected to represent Montenegro at the Eurovision Song Contest 2015. Among others, Ksenia provided the backing vocals for his song "Adio". At the contest, the song placed 13th in the grand final and went on to become the most successful Montenegrin entry in the contest to date.

=== Collaborations with SevdahBaby ===
In 2017, Knežević collaborated with Serbian DJ and singer Milan Stanković, best known as SevdahBaby. They recorded two songs. Their first song, "Ti samo budi dovoljno daleko" (Just be far enough), was released on 24 April 2017, while their second song, "Zgrabi me nežno" (Grab me gently), was released on 3 July 2017, for which they also released their respective music videos.

After the collaboration with SevdahBaby, she started singing as backing vocalist at concerts and performances of various famous musicians, such as Dado Topić and Željko Joksimović.

=== Hurricane (2017–2022) ===
In 2017, Knežević was revealed as a member of the Serbian girl group Hurricane. Their first single, "Irma, Maria", was released shortly afterwards. The group gained regional popularity with the song "Favorito", which quickly took over the regional charts and the YouTube trending pages. They participated in the 2020 edition of Beovizija, the Serbian national selection for the Eurovision Song Contest 2020, where they won the competition and therefore were selected to represent Serbia at the Eurovision Song Contest 2020 with the song "Hasta la vista". However, in March the contest was cancelled due to COVID-19.

In November 2020, it was confirmed that Hurricane would represent Serbia at the Eurovision Song Contest 2021 with the song "Loco loco". At the contest, Hurricane performed in the second semi-final and placed 8th with 124 points, therefore qualifying for the grand final. In the final, they placed 15th in a field of 26 entrants, scoring 102 points. After the contest, "Loco loco" went on to become a huge hit in the Balkan region.

After the contest, the group released various singles and collaborations. On 4 May 2022, Hurricane announced that they would be disbanding, with its members going on to pursue their solo careers.

=== Solo Career (2022–) ===
On October 6, 2022, she released her fist solo single after Hurricane titled "Hir" in her own record label named Kseniart.

== Personal life ==
Knežević was born in Belgrade, where she currently lives. She is the daughter of popular Montenegrin pop-folk singer Nenad Knežević Knez. She graduated at Singidunum University. She has year younger sister named Andrea. Knežević has been in a relationship with architect Nikola Todorović since 2015.

== Discography ==
=== With Knez ===
- Šarene laže (2003)
- Adio (2015)

=== With Sky's ===
- Magija (2013)

=== With SevdahBABY ===
- Ti samo budi dovoljno daleko (2017)
- Zgrabi me nežno (2017)

=== Solo career ===
- Hir (2022)
- Voulez Vous (feat. Albino) (2023)
- Nisam Dobro (2023)
- Ko Ja I Ti (2024)

Awards and achievements
Preceded by	Serbia in the Eurovision Song Contest; 2021	Succeeded by
