= Ivana Peters =

Ivana Peters Ивана Петерс
- Also known as: Ivana Negativ
- Born: Ivana Pavlović; 22 August 1974 (age 52); Belgrade, SR Serbia, SFR Yugoslavia
- Genres: Pop-rock
- Occupations: Singer; songwriter
- Years active: 1989–present
- Labels: PGP RTS; City Records
- Member of: Negative
- Formerly of: Tap 011
- Spouse: Aleksandar Peters (m. 2005; div. 2008)

Ivana Pavlović (Serbian Cyrillic: Ивана Павловић; born 22 August 1974), better known as Ivana Peters (Serbian Cyrillic: Ивана Петерс) or Ivana Negativ (Serbian Cyrillic: Ивана Негатив), is a Serbian singer-songwriter. Initially recognised as a member of the nineties dance-pop group Tap 011, she also became a lead singer of the pop-rock band Negative in 1999.

Pavlović appeared in the third season of the Serbian spin-off of Your Face Sounds Familiar in 2016, finishing in the fifth place.

She has also served as a back vocalist to many Serbian artists such as Jelena Karleuša, and wrote "Goodbye (Shelter)" performed by Sanja Vučić for the 2016 Eurovision Song Contest.

Pavlović was married to the Sunshine guitarist, Aleksandar Peters, with whom she has a daughter named Sara.

== Discography ==
With Tap 011

- Novi Svet (1995)
- Gaće (1996)
- Možda ti se vratim kao Lesi (1997)
- Igra (1998)

With Negative

- Negative (1999)
- Ni ovde ni tamo (2002)
- Tango (2004)
- Spusti me na zemlju (2009)

== See also ==
- Music of Serbia

Awards and achievements
Preceded by Toše Proeski	Beovizija winner (as part of Negative); 2004	Succeeded by Jelena Tomašević
