= Serbia in the Eurovision Song Contest 2016 =

- Eurovision Song Contest 2016
- Participating broadcaster: Radio Television of Serbia (RTS)
- Country: Serbia
- Selection process: Internal selection
- Announcement date: Artist: 5 March 2016; Song: 12 March 2016

Competing entry
- Song: "Goodbye (Shelter)"
- Artist: Sanja Vučić Zaa
- Songwriters: Ivana Peters

Placement
- Semi-final result: Qualified (10th, 105 points)
- Final result: 18th, 115 points

Participation chronology

Serbia was represented at the Eurovision Song Contest 2016 with the song "Goodbye (Shelter)" written by Ivana Peters. The song was performed by Sanja Vučić Zaa, who was internally selected by the Serbian national broadcaster, Radio Television of Serbia (RTS) to represent Serbia in the 2016 contest in Stockholm, Sweden. Vučić was announced as the Serbian representative on 5 March 2016, while the song, "Goodbye (Shelter)", was presented on 12 March 2016 during a show titled Pesma Srbije za Evropu ("Serbia's song for Europe").

Serbia was drawn to compete in the second semi-final of the Eurovision Song Contest which took place on 12 May 2016. Performing during the show in position 6, "Goodbye (Shelter)" was announced among the top 10 entries of the second semi-final and therefore qualified to compete in the final on 14 May. It was later revealed that Serbia placed tenth out of the 18 participating countries in the semi-final with 105 points. In the final, Serbia performed in position 15 and placed eighteenth out of the 26 participating countries, scoring 115 points.

== Background ==
Prior to the 2016 contest, Serbia had participated in the Eurovision Song Contest eight times since its first entry in 2007, winning the contest with their debut entry "Molitva" performed by Marija Šerifović. Since 2007, six out of eight of Serbia's entries have featured in the final with the nation failing to qualify in 2009 and 2013. After returning to the Eurovision Song Contest following their one-year withdrawal in 2014, Serbia's 2015 entry "Beauty Never Lies" performed by Bojana Stamenov qualified to the final and placed tenth.

The Serbian national broadcaster, Radio Television of Serbia (RTS), broadcasts the event within Serbia and organises the selection process for the nation's entry. RTS confirmed their intentions to participate at the 2016 Eurovision Song Contest on 9 November 2015. Between 2007 and 2009, Serbia used the Beovizija national final in order to select their entry. However, after their 2009 entry, "Cipela" performed by Marko Kon and Milaan, failed to qualify Serbia to the final, the broadcaster shifted their selection strategy to selecting specific composers to create songs for artists. In 2010, RTS selected Goran Bregović to compose songs for a national final featuring three artists, while in 2011 Kornelije Kovač, Aleksandra Kovač and Kristina Kovač were tasked with composing one song each. In 2012, the internal selection of Željko Joksimović and the song "Nije ljubav stvar" secured the country's second highest placing in the contest to this point, placing third. In 2013, RTS returned to an open national final format and organized the Beosong competition. The winning entry, "Ljubav je svuda" performed by Moje 3, failed to qualify Serbia to the final at the Eurovision Song Contest 2013. In 2015, RTS selected Vladimir Graić, the composer of Serbia's 2007 Eurovision Song Contest winning entry "Molitva", to compose songs for a national final featuring three artists.

== Before Eurovision ==
=== Internal selection ===
RTS internally selected the Serbian entry for the Eurovision Song Contest 2016. The name of the artist to represent Serbia, Sanja Vučić, the lead singer of the group ZAA, was confirmed by RTS on 5 March 2016 after media leaks. A press conference with the artist, held by RTS, took place on 7 March 2016 in Košutnjak, Belgrade where it was announced that the song Vučić would perform at the Eurovision Song Contest would be titled "Goodbye (Shelter)" and was written by Serbian singer-songwriter and lead vocalist of the rock band Negative, Ivana Peters. "Goodbye (Shelter)" was described by RTS as a love song that carries a message about violence against women. In regards to the selected artist, Dragan Ilić, the Head of Serbia's Eurovision Song Contest delegation stated: "This year we decided to introduce a completely new face. A young and talented artist. We believe that it's going to be a big surprise for the Eurovision fans in Serbia and abroad. The decision was made by RTS music editors, and this method helped us to choose and send someone new. We think that our representative will represent Serbia in Sweden in a best possible way." The Serbian entry was entirely developed and produced by RTS with producers, authors and the orchestra being used for the project; orchestration and programming were carried out by Ivan Ilić, a conductor of the RTS Big Band Jazz Orchestra, and Uroš Marković. A Serbian language version of the entry titled "Iza osmeha" was also recorded.

"Goodbye (Shelter)" was presented in a show titled Pesma Srbije za Evropu (Serbia's Song for Europe) which took place on 12 March 2016, hosted by Slobodan Šarenac, Vladimir Jelić, Dejan Pantelić and Milan Popović. The show was broadcast on RTS1 and RTS Sat as well as streamed online via the broadcaster's website rts.rs and the official Eurovision Song Contest website eurovision.tv. Actress Seka Sablić was featured as a guest during the show. In regards to the song, songwriter Ivana Peters stated: "Violence in any form is unacceptable for me. This song is about destructive love, which turns into a psychological and physical violence at some point. I would like people to recognize it and to start to talk about it. They should not close their eyes. They should react and do something. We all have to find the savior in ourselves. The most important thing is to recognize the strength that you have as a being. The strength that brings love and peace."

=== Promotion ===
Sanja Vučić made several appearances across Europe to specifically promote "Goodbye (Shelter)" as the Serbian Eurovision entry. On 2 April, Vučić performed during the Eurovision PreParty Riga, which was organised by OGAE Latvia and held at the Spikeri Concert Hall in Riga, Latvia. On 9 April, Vučić performed during the Eurovision in Concert event which was held at the Melkweg venue in Amsterdam, Netherlands and hosted by Cornald Maas and Hera Björk. Between 11 and 13 April, Vučić took part in promotional activities in Tel Aviv, Israel and performed during the Israel Calling event held at the Ha'teatron venue. Between 22 and 23 April, Sanja Vučić completed promotional activities in Malta where she appeared during the TVM talk show programme Xarabank and performed during the Malta Eurovision Party at the Aria Complex in San Ġwann.

In addition to her international appearances, Sanja Vučić also completed promotion within Serbia in the lead up to the Eurovision Song Contest. On 15 April, she attended and performed "Goodbye (Shelter)" at the karaoke competition Cityvizija 2016, which was organised by OGAE Serbia and the Belgrade shopping centre Delta City, where the event took place. On 20 April, Vučić was a guest performer during the RTS Sat programme Srbija na vezi—a show aimed at the Serbian diaspora. On 26 April, Vučić appeared in and performed during a special Eurovision themed edition of the RTV Pink programme Ami G Show. RTS held a press conference on 27 April where the Serbian delegation that would be travelling to Stockholm was presented, which also featured performances by Sanja Vučić.

== At Eurovision ==
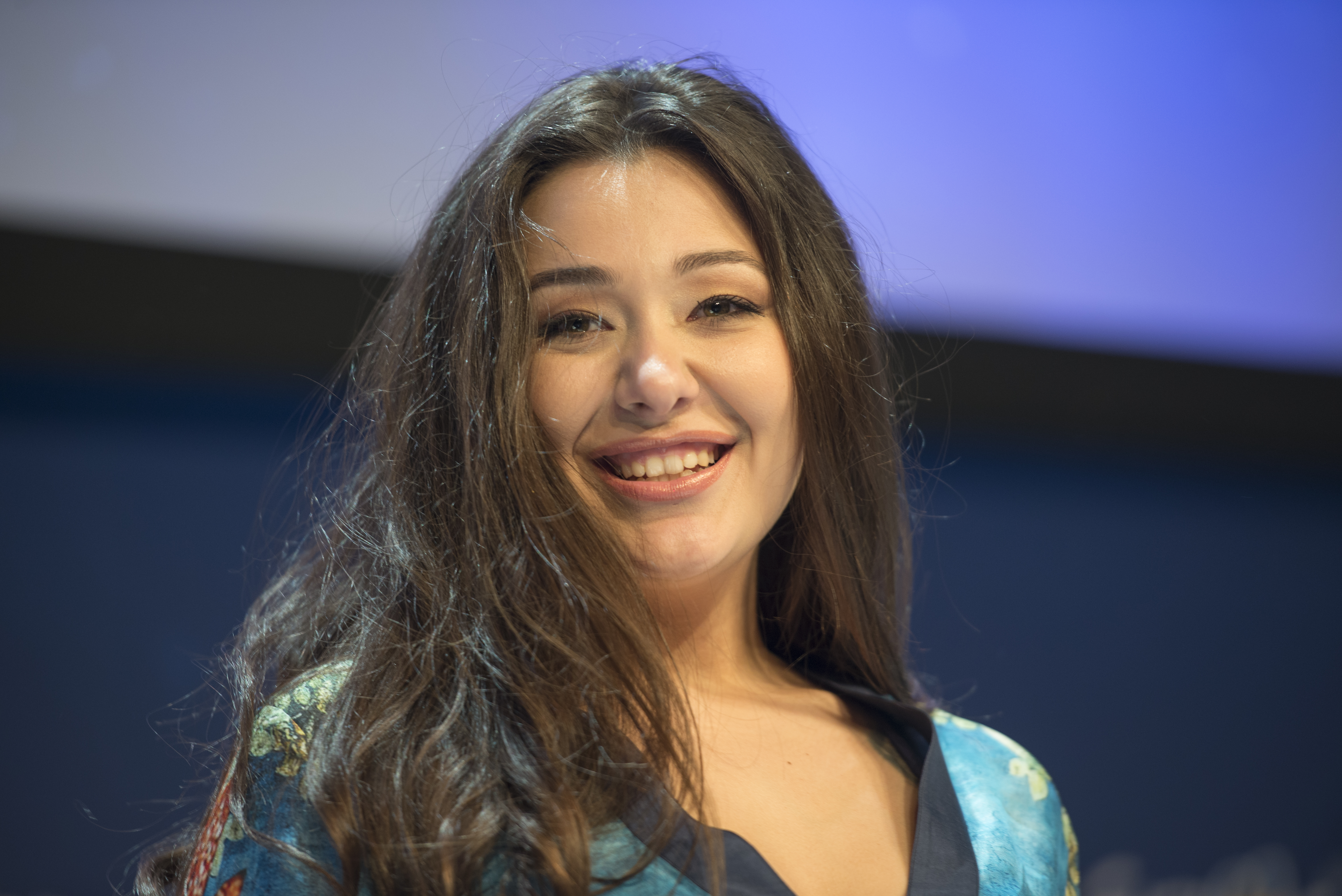
Sanja Vučić ZAA during a press meet and greet

According to Eurovision rules, all nations with the exceptions of the host country and the "Big Five" (France, Germany, Italy, Spain and the United Kingdom) are required to qualify from one of two semi-finals in order to compete for the final; the top ten countries from each semi-final progress to the final. The European Broadcasting Union (EBU) split up the competing countries into six different pots based on voting patterns from previous contests, with countries with favourable voting histories put into the same pot. On 25 January 2016, a special allocation draw was held which placed each country into one of the two semi-finals, as well as which half of the show they would perform in. Serbia was placed into the second semi-final, to be held on 12 May 2016, and was scheduled to perform in the first half of the show.

Once all the competing songs for the 2016 contest had been released, the running order for the semi-finals was decided by the shows' producers rather than through another draw, so that similar songs were not placed next to each other. Serbia was set to perform in position 6, following the entry from Belarus and before the entry from Ireland.

The two semi-finals and the final were broadcast in Serbia on RTS1, RTS HD and RTS Sat with commentary for the first semi-final by Dragan Ilić and commentary for the second semi-final and final by Duška Vučinić. The Serbian spokesperson, who announced the top 12-point score awarded by the Serbian jury during the final, was Dragana Kosjerina.

=== Semi-final ===
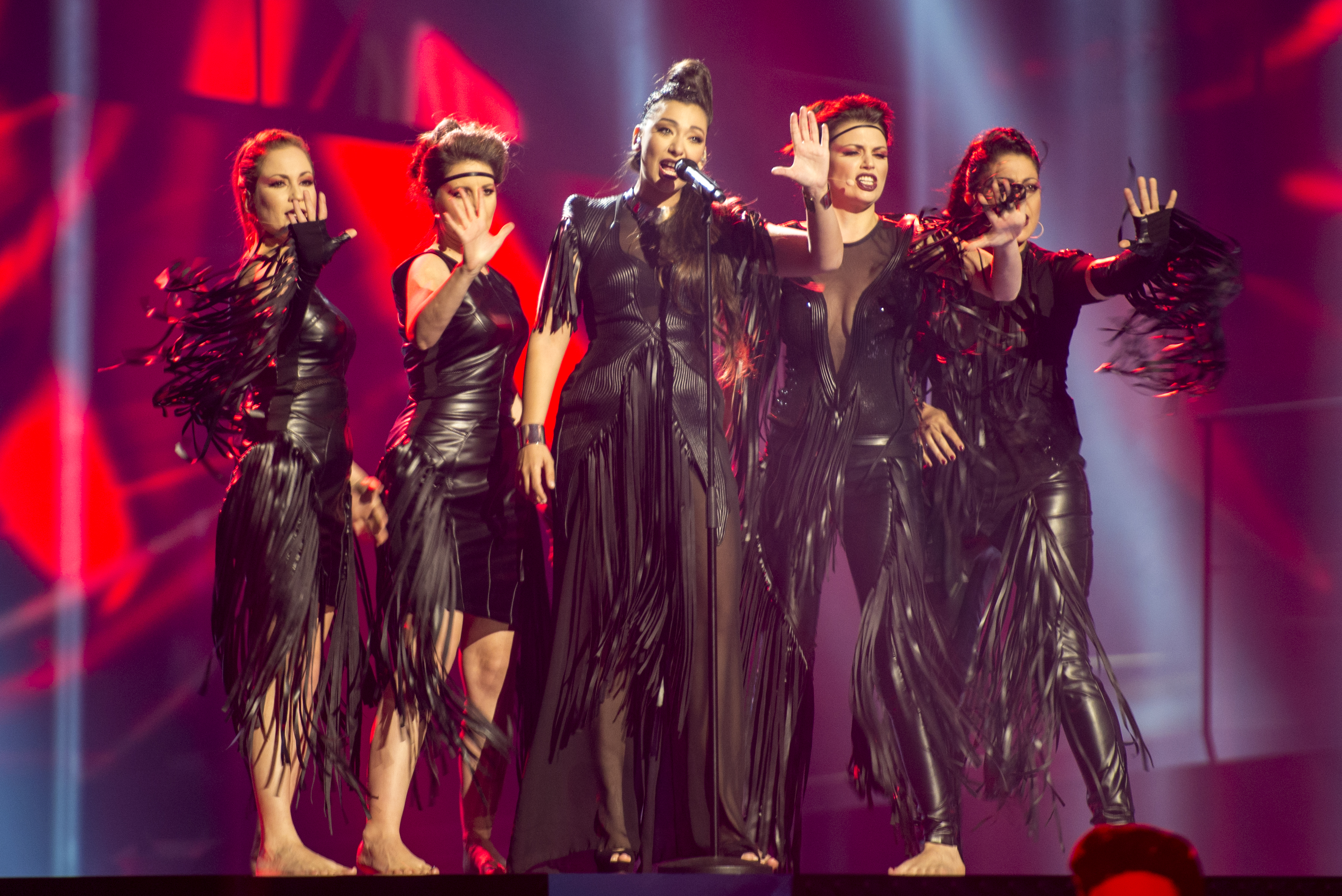
Sanja Vučić ZAA during a rehearsal before the second semi-final

Sanja Vučić ZAA took part in technical rehearsals on 4 and 7 May, followed by dress rehearsals on 11 and 12 May. This included the jury show on 11 May where the professional juries of each country watched and voted on the competing entries.

The Serbian performance featured Sanja Vučić performing together with four backing vocalists and a male ballet dancer. The choreography and staging of the performance interpreted the song's abuse of women in domestic violence message with Vučić and the backing vocalists trying to escape from the male dancer. The stage lighting and background LED screens predominately displayed red colours and patterns with images of female faces. The director of the Serbian performance was Marko Novaković and the choreography was completed by Staša Stanković. The four backing vocalists that joined Sanja Vučić on stage were: Lena Kuzmanović, Jelena Đurić, Iva Pletikosić and Dunja Vujadinović. The male ballet dancer was Miloš Isailović. The black stage costumes for the performance were designed by studio Morfijum and designer Jelena Malešević.

At the end of the show, Serbia was announced as having finished in the top 10 and subsequently qualifying for the grand final. It was later revealed that Serbia placed tenth in the semi-final, receiving a total of 105 points: 50 points from the televoting and 55 points from the juries.

=== Final ===
Shortly after the second semi-final, a winners' press conference was held for the ten qualifying countries. As part of this press conference, the qualifying artists took part in a draw to determine which half of the grand final they would subsequently participate in. This draw was done in the reverse order the countries appeared in the semi-final running order. Serbia was drawn to compete in the second half. Following this draw, the shows' producers decided upon the running order of the final, as they had done for the semi-finals. Serbia was subsequently placed to perform in position 15, following the entry from Cyprus and before the entry from Lithuania.

Sanja Vučić ZAA once again took part in dress rehearsals on 13 and 14 May before the final, including the jury final where the professional juries cast their final votes before the live show. Vučić performed a repeat of her semi-final performance during the final on 14 May. Serbia placed eighteenth in the final, scoring 115 points: 80 points from the televoting and 35 points from the juries.

=== Voting ===
Voting during the three shows was conducted under a new system that involved each country now awarding two sets of points from 1-8, 10 and 12: one from their professional jury and the other from televoting. Each nation's jury consisted of five music industry professionals who are citizens of the country they represent, with their names published before the contest to ensure transparency. This jury judged each entry based on: vocal capacity; the stage performance; the song's composition and originality; and the overall impression by the act. In addition, no member of a national jury was permitted to be related in any way to any of the competing acts in such a way that they cannot vote impartially and independently. The individual rankings of each jury member as well as the nation's televoting results were released shortly after the grand final.

Below is a breakdown of points awarded to Serbia and awarded by Serbia in the second semi-final and grand final of the contest, and the breakdown of the jury voting and televoting conducted during the two shows:

==== Points awarded to Serbia ====
Points awarded to Serbia (Semi-final 2)
Score	Televote	Jury
12 points	Slovenia; Switzerland	Macedonia
10 points	Macedonia	
8 points		Albania; Bulgaria
7 points		
6 points	Italy	
5 points	Bulgaria	Belarus; Italy; Latvia
4 points		
3 points		Australia; Switzerland; Ukraine
2 points	Australia; Georgia	Belgium
1 point	Germany	Poland

Points awarded to Serbia (Final)
Score	Televote	Jury
12 points	Bosnia and Herzegovina; Croatia; Macedonia; Montenegro; Slovenia; Switzerland	
10 points		
8 points		Bosnia and Herzegovina
7 points		Macedonia
6 points		Montenegro
5 points		Bulgaria; Slovenia
4 points	Austria; Italy	
3 points		
2 points		Croatia; United Kingdom
1 point		

==== Points awarded by Serbia ====
Points awarded by Serbia (Semi-final 2)
Score	Televote	Jury
12 points	Macedonia	Macedonia
10 points	Belgium	Ukraine
8 points	Bulgaria	Albania
7 points	Australia	Israel
6 points	Ukraine	Slovenia
5 points	Belarus	Lithuania
4 points	Slovenia	Australia
3 points	Norway	Georgia
2 points	Georgia	Bulgaria
1 point	Poland	Poland

Points awarded by Serbia (Final)
Score	Televote	Jury
12 points	Russia	Ukraine
10 points	Hungary	Malta
8 points	Bulgaria	Lithuania
7 points	Ukraine	Israel
6 points	Australia	Australia
5 points	Belgium	Netherlands
4 points	Croatia	Bulgaria
3 points	Cyprus	Armenia
2 points	Armenia	United Kingdom
1 point	Sweden	Russia

==== Detailed voting results ====
The following members comprised the Serbian jury:

- Slobodan Marković (jury chairperson) – composer, conductor for the Yugoslav entry in the 1991 contest
- Nikola Čuturilo (Čutura) – composer, lyricist, guitar player, singer
- Vladimir Graić – composer, winning songwriter of the 2007 contest
- Marija Marić (Mari Mari) – singer, composer, lyricist
- Ana Milenković – singer

Detailed voting results from Serbia (Semi-final 2)
R/O	Country	Jury							Televote	
R/O	Country	S. Marković	Čutura	V. Graić	Mari Mari	A. Milenković	Rank	Points	Rank	Points
01	Latvia	14	15	5	11	10	11		13	
02	Poland	13	14	13	5	9	10	1	10	1
03	Switzerland	17	9	12	9	13	14		15	
04	Israel	5	3	3	6	6	4	7	12	
05	Belarus	12	13	15	16	14	15		6	5
06	Serbia									
07	Ireland	8	16	16	13	17	16		17	
08	Macedonia	1	2	1	1	2	1	12	1	12
09	Lithuania	7	8	6	8	3	6	5	11	
10	Australia	6	11	8	7	11	7	4	4	7
11	Slovenia	9	4	4	4	8	5	6	7	4
12	Bulgaria	11	10	11	10	7	9	2	3	8
13	Denmark	16	17	17	17	16	17		14	
14	Ukraine	2	1	9	2	1	2	10	5	6
15	Norway	15	6	7	12	15	13		8	3
16	Georgia	4	5	10	15	12	8	3	9	2
17	Albania	3	7	2	3	4	3	8	16	
18	Belgium	10	12	14	14	5	12		2	10

Detailed voting results from Serbia (Final)
R/O	Country	Jury							Televote	
R/O	Country	S. Marković	Čutura	V. Graić	Mari Mari	A. Milenković	Rank	Points	Rank	Points
01	Belgium	23	10	10	12	7	13		6	5
02	Czech Republic	17	19	17	23	22	21		24	
03	Netherlands	10	5	9	13	6	6	5	18	
04	Azerbaijan	11	16	15	22	21	17		21	
05	Hungary	20	21	18	21	20	22		2	10
06	Italy	14	12	11	4	19	12		15	
07	Israel	8	2	2	14	5	4	7	16	
08	Bulgaria	6	14	4	8	14	7	4	3	8
09	Sweden	22	22	24	20	24	25		10	1
10	Germany	24	23	19	15	23	23		23	
11	France	19	18	22	16	13	19		12	
12	Poland	9	15	16	9	10	11		13	
13	Australia	3	6	8	7	8	5	6	5	6
14	Cyprus	12	20	23	19	17	20		8	3
15	Serbia									
16	Lithuania	7	8	7	3	2	3	8	20	
17	Croatia	15	24	13	24	11	18		7	4
18	Russia	13	11	6	11	15	10	1	1	12
19	Spain	4	17	20	10	16	15		14	
20	Latvia	16	13	5	17	12	14		19	
21	Ukraine	1	1	3	1	1	1	12	4	7
22	Malta	2	3	1	2	3	2	10	22	
23	Georgia	25	9	21	5	18	16		17	
24	Austria	18	25	25	18	25	24		11	
25	United Kingdom	5	4	12	25	9	9	2	25	
26	Armenia	21	7	14	6	4	8	3	9	2
