= Montenegro in the Eurovision Song Contest 2015 =

- Eurovision Song Contest 2015
- Participating broadcaster: Radio i Televizija Crne Gore (RTCG)
- Country: Montenegro
- Selection process: Internal selection
- Announcement date: Artist: 31 October 2014; Song: 17 March 2015

Competing entry
- Song: "Adio"
- Artist: Knez
- Songwriters: Željko Joksimović; Marina Tucaković; Dejan Ivanović

Placement
- Semi-final result: Qualified (9th, 57 points)
- Final result: 13th, 44 points

Participation chronology

Montenegro was represented at the Eurovision Song Contest 2015 with the song "Adio" written by Željko Joksimović, Marina Tucaković and Dejan Ivanović. The song was performed by Knez, who was internally selected by the Montenegrin broadcaster Radio i televizija Crne Gore (RTCG) to represent the nation at the 2015 contest in Vienna, Austria. Songwriter Željko Joksimović represented Serbia and Montenegro in the Eurovision Song Contest 2004 with the song "Lane moje" and Serbia in the Eurovision Song Contest 2012 with the song "Nije ljubav stvar" where he respectively placed second and third in the grand final of the competition. Knez was announced as the Montenegrin representative on 31 October 2014, while his song, "Adio", was presented to the public on 17 March 2015.

Montenegro was drawn to compete in the second semi-final of the Eurovision Song Contest which took place on 21 May 2015. Performing during the show in position 4, "Adio" was announced among the top 10 entries of the second semi-final and therefore qualified to compete in the final on 10 May. It was later revealed that Montenegro placed ninth out of the 17 participating countries in the semi-final with 57 points. In the final, Montenegro performed in position 16 and placed thirteenth out of the 27 participating countries, scoring 44 points.

== Background ==
Prior to the 2015 contest, Montenegro had participated in the Eurovision Song Contest as an independent nation six times since its first entry in its own right in 2007. The nation's best placing in the contest was nineteenth, which they achieved in 2014 with the song "Moj svijet" performed by Sergej Ćetković. This was also the first time Montenegro qualified to the final since they began participating. The nation briefly withdrew from the competition between 2010 and 2011 citing financial difficulties as the reason for their absence.

The Montenegrin national broadcaster, Radio i televizija Crne Gore (RTCG), broadcasts the event within Montenegro and organises the selection process for the nation's entry. RTCG confirmed that Montenegro would participate at the Eurovision Song Contest 2015 on 9 September 2014. Montenegro has used various methods to select the Montenegrin entry in the past, such as internal selections and televised national finals to choose the performer, song or both to compete at Eurovision. Since 2009, the broadcaster has opted to internally select both the artist and song that would represent Montenegro, a procedure that continued for the selection of the 2015 entry.

== Before Eurovision ==
=== Internal selection ===
On 31 October 2014, it was announced during a press conference held at the RTCG Headquarters in Podgorica that Nenad Knežević Knez would represent Montenegro in Vienna. Knez previously attempted to represent Montenegro at the Eurovision Song Contest in 2008 where he placed third in the artist selection. Knez also attempted to represent Serbia and Montenegro in 2004 where he placed seventeenth in their national final with the song "Navika". In regards to his selection at the Montenegrin entrant, Knez stated: "I'll do my best and invest all my experience and knowledge. At the same time I'm hoping to have a perfect song which will represent Montenegro in the best possible way."

The Montenegrin song, "Adio", was set to be presented on 21 March 2015 during a television special held in Podgorica. However, the song was instead released on 17 March 2015 alongside the official music video, directed by Andrej Ilić, via the official Eurovision Song Contest's YouTube channel due to online leaks. "Adio" was written by Željko Joksimović, Marina Tucaković and Dejan Ivanović. Earlier in late February 2015, RTCG confirmed that Knez's Eurovision song would be composed by Serbian singer-songwriter Željko Joksimović who previously represented Serbia and Montenegro at the Eurovision Song Contest in 2004 and Serbia in 2012, respectively placing second and third with the songs "Lane moje" and "Nije ljubav stvar". Joksimović had also previously composed the Bosnian and Serbian songs in 2006 and 2008, respectively. In regards to the song, Knez stated: "I am very pleased with the composition which will represent our country and I can say that the reactions of those who had the opportunity to hear it are positive on first listen, as we inspire optimism that we will achieve a good result in Vienna."

=== Preparation ===
In the lead up to the contest, Knez released English and French language versions of "Adio" on 29 April. The English version had lyrics written by Nicole Rodriguez, Tami Rodriguez, Dunja Vujadinović and Milica Fajgelj while lyrics for the French version were written by Rob Wolfson.

=== Promotion ===
Knez made several appearances across Europe to specifically promote "Adio" as the Montenegrin Eurovision entry. On 9 April, Knez performed during the Eurovision in Concert event which was held at the Melkweg venue in Amsterdam, Netherlands and hosted by Cornald Maas and Edsilia Rombley. On 15 April, Knez made an appearance in the RTS1 programme Nedeljno popodne in Serbia and performed during a preview event which was organised by OGAE Serbia and held at the UŠĆE Shopping Centre in Belgrade. On 24 April, Knez performed during the Eurovision Pre-Party, which was held at the Place de Paris Korston Concert Hall in Moscow, Russia. On 26 April, Knez performed during the London Eurovision Party, which was held at the Café de Paris venue in London, United Kingdom and hosted by Nicki French and Paddy O'Connell.

== At Eurovision ==
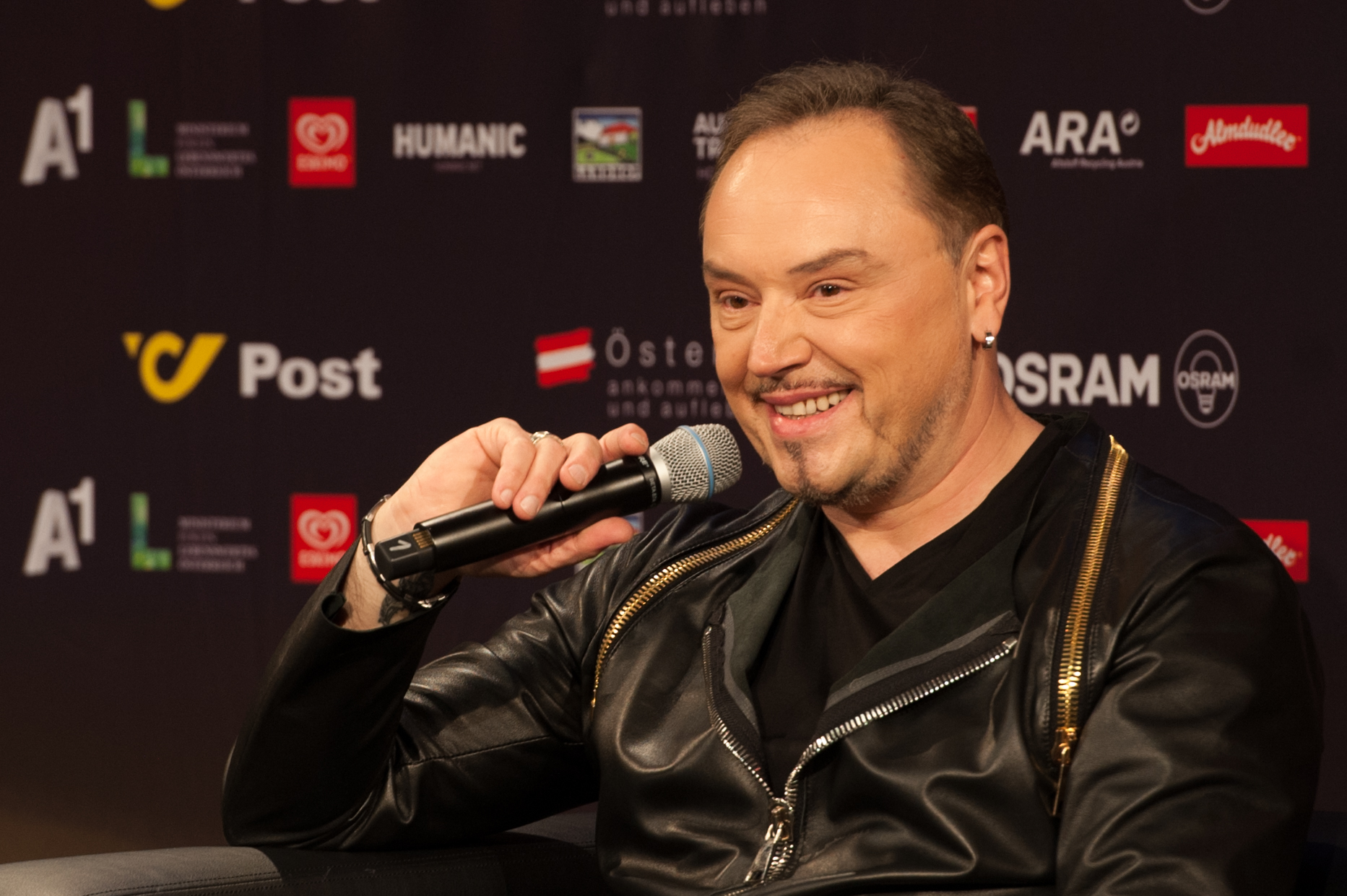
Knez during a press meet and greet

According to Eurovision rules, all nations with the exceptions of the host country and the "Big Five" (France, Germany, Italy, Spain and the United Kingdom) are required to qualify from one of two semi-finals in order to compete for the final; the top ten countries from each semi-final progress to the final. In the 2015 contest, Australia also competed directly in the final as an invited guest nation. The European Broadcasting Union (EBU) split up the competing countries into five different pots based on voting patterns from previous contests, with countries with favourable voting histories put into the same pot. On 26 January 2015, a special allocation draw was held which placed each country into one of the two semi-finals, as well as which half of the show they would perform in. Montenegro was placed into the second semi-final, to be held on 21 May 2015, and was scheduled to perform in the first half of the show.

Once all the competing songs for the 2015 contest had been released, the running order for the semi-finals was decided by the shows' producers rather than through another draw, so that similar songs were not placed next to each other. Montenegro was set to perform in position 4, following the entry from San Marino and before the entry from Malta.

The two semi-finals and the final were broadcast in Montenegro on TVCG 2 with commentary by Dražen Bauković and Tamara Ivanković. The Montenegrin spokesperson, who announced the Montenegrin votes during the final, was Andrea Demirović, who represented Montenegro in the Eurovision Song Contest 2009.

=== Semi-final ===
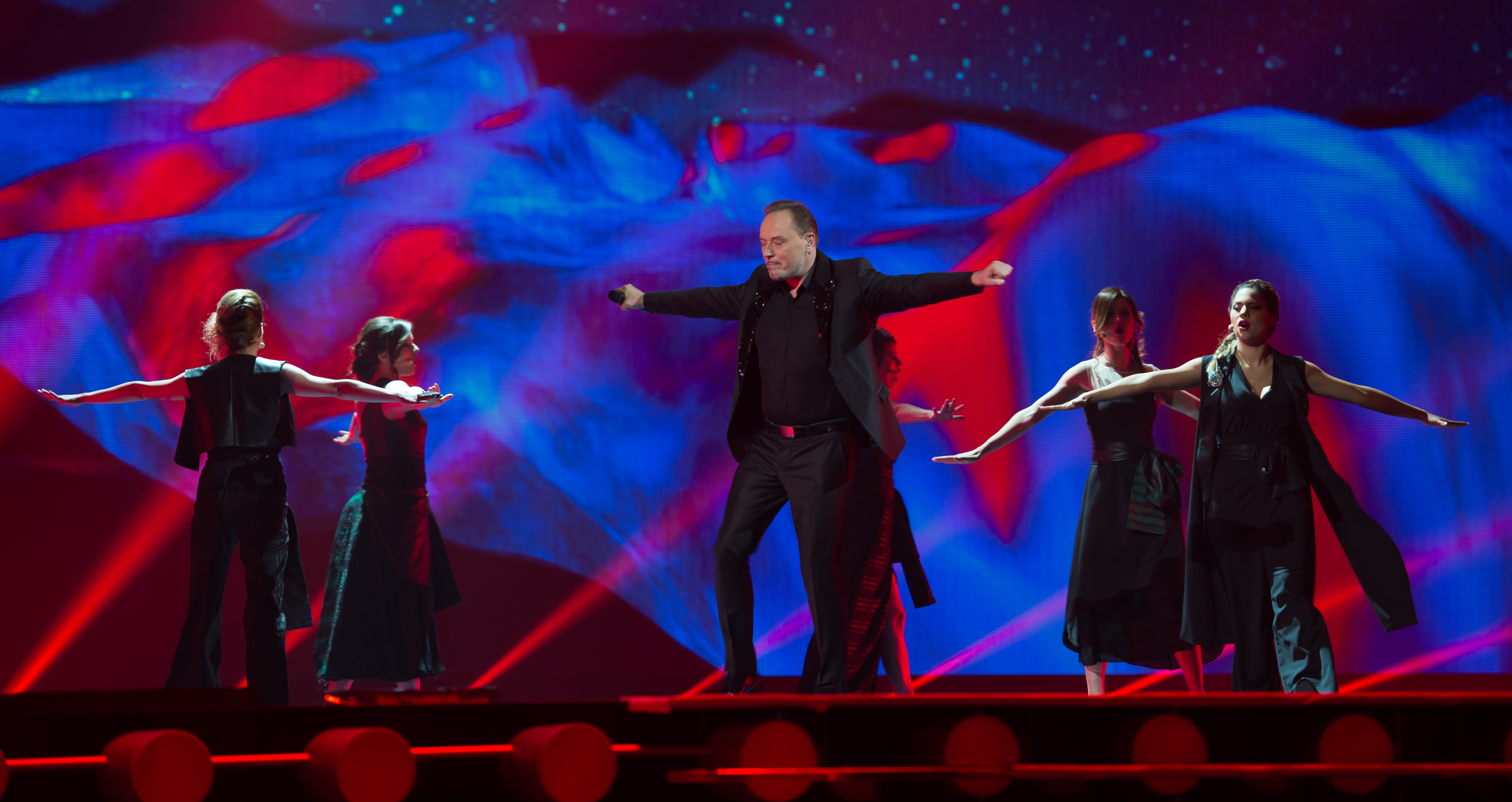
Knez during a rehearsal before the second semi-final

Knez took part in technical rehearsals on 13 and 16 May, followed by dress rehearsals on 20 and 21 May. This included the jury show on 20 May where the professional juries of each country watched and voted on the competing entries.

The Montenegrin performance featured Knez on stage in a black suit with five backing vocalists in black wide-leg trousers with green and beige parts. In regards to the performance, stage director for the performance Marko Novaković stated: "Considering that the song written by Željko Joksiković has some modern, but also some traditional, ethnic elements, the visual elements needs to follow the story of a song. What you will see during the performance on the LED floor and background is: the mountains, Adriatic sea, but also traditional Montenegrin dances". The outfits of the performers were created by designer Boško Jakovljević. The backing vocalists also wore jewellery designed by Katarina Zlajić. The five backing vocalists performing with Knez were Dunja Vujadinović, Lena Kuzmanović, Ivana Vlahović, Jelena Pajić and Ksenija Knežević. Knežević would go on to represent Serbia in the Eurovision Song Contest 2021 as part of the group Hurricane.

At the end of the show, Montenegro was announced as having finished in the top ten and subsequently qualifying for the grand final. It was later revealed that Montenegro placed ninth in the semi-final, receiving a total of 57 points.

=== Final ===
Shortly after the second semi-final, a winner's press conference was held for the ten qualifying countries. As part of this press conference, the qualifying artists took part in a draw to determine which half of the grand final they would subsequently participate in. This draw was done in the order the countries were announced during the semi-final. Montenegro was drawn to compete in the second half. Following this draw, the shows' producers decided upon the running order of the final, as they had done for the semi-finals. Montenegro was subsequently placed to perform in position 16, following the entry from Greece and before the entry from Germany.

Knez once again took part in dress rehearsals on 22 and 23 May before the final, including the jury final where the professional juries cast their final votes before the live show. Knez performed a repeat of his semi-final performance during the final on 23 May. At the conclusion of the voting, Montenegro placed thirteenth with 44 points. This marked the best placing of Montenegro in the history of the contest.

=== Voting ===
Voting during the three shows consisted of 50 percent public televoting and 50 percent from a jury deliberation. The jury consisted of five music industry professionals who were citizens of the country they represent, with their names published before the contest to ensure transparency. This jury was asked to judge each contestant based on: vocal capacity; the stage performance; the song's composition and originality; and the overall impression by the act. In addition, no member of a national jury could be related in any way to any of the competing acts in such a way that they cannot vote impartially and independently. The individual rankings of each jury member were released shortly after the grand final. In the second semi-final, Montenegro's vote was based on 100 percent jury voting, which was implemented due to either technical issues with the televoting or an insufficient number of votes. In the final, Montenegro's vote was based on 100 percent televoting after the EBU announced that it had disqualified the Montenegrin jury results in the final due to irregularities. The exclusion of the votes was decided upon in consultation with the contest's independent voting observer, PricewaterhouseCoopers, and based upon the decision of the Executive Supervisor and the Chairman of the Reference Group.

Following the release of the full split voting by the EBU after the conclusion of the competition, it was revealed that Montenegro had placed eighteenth with the public televote and twelfth with the jury vote in the final. In the public vote, Montenegro scored 34 points, while with the jury vote, Montenegro scored 44 points. In the second semi-final, Montenegro placed ninth with the public televote with 58 points and eleventh with the jury vote, scoring 47 points.

Below is a breakdown of points awarded to Montenegro and awarded by Montenegro in the second semi-final and grand final of the contest, and the breakdown of the jury voting and televoting conducted during the two shows:

==== Points awarded to Montenegro ====
Points awarded to Montenegro (Semi-final 2)
Score	Country
12 points	
10 points	Azerbaijan; Slovenia
8 points	
7 points	Israel; Sweden
6 points	Czech Republic
5 points	Portugal
4 points	Italy
3 points	Norway
2 points	Cyprus; Latvia
1 point	Switzerland

Points awarded to Montenegro (Final)
Score	Country
12 points	Serbia
10 points	Slovenia
8 points	Armenia
7 points	
6 points	Albania
5 points	
4 points	Macedonia
3 points	
2 points	Azerbaijan; Sweden
1 point	

==== Points awarded by Montenegro ====
Points awarded by Montenegro (Semi-final 2)
Score	Country
12 points	Slovenia
10 points	Malta
8 points	Sweden
7 points	Azerbaijan
6 points	Norway
5 points	San Marino
4 points	Portugal
3 points	Israel
2 points	Ireland
1 point	Czech Republic

Points awarded by Montenegro (Final)
Score	Country
12 points	Serbia
10 points	Albania
8 points	Azerbaijan
7 points	Russia
6 points	Italy
5 points	Sweden
4 points	Slovenia
3 points	Israel
2 points	Spain
1 point	Estonia

==== Detailed voting results ====
The following members comprised the Montenegrin jury:

- Ilija Dapčević (jury chairperson) – professor of music
- Aleksandra Vojvodić – professor of music, singer
- Darko Nikčević – musician
- Renata Perazić – musician
- Senad Drešević – composer

Detailed voting results from Montenegro (Semi-final 2)
R/O	Country	I. Dapčević	A. Vojvodić	D. Nikčević	R. Perazić	S. Drešević	Jury Rank	Points
01	Lithuania	13	12	13	11	11	11	
02	Ireland	9	9	9	9	10	9	2
03	San Marino	6	7	6	6	8	6	5
04	Montenegro							
05	Malta	2	1	2	2	3	2	10
06	Norway	5	5	5	4	5	5	6
07	Portugal	7	6	7	7	6	7	4
08	Czech Republic	10	10	10	10	16	10	1
09	Israel	8	8	8	8	7	8	3
10	Latvia	12	13	11	14	14	13	
11	Azerbaijan	4	4	4	5	4	4	7
12	Iceland	16	16	15	16	9	15	
13	Sweden	3	3	1	3	2	3	8
14	Switzerland	14	14	12	15	13	14	
15	Cyprus	15	15	16	13	15	16	
16	Slovenia	1	2	3	1	1	1	12
17	Poland	11	11	14	12	12	12	

Detailed voting results from Montenegro (Final)
R/O	Country	Televote Rank	Points
01	Slovenia	7	4
02	France	25	
03	Israel	8	3
04	Estonia	10	1
05	United Kingdom	22	
06	Armenia	15	
07	Lithuania	24	
08	Serbia	1	12
09	Norway	17	
10	Sweden	6	5
11	Cyprus	21	
12	Australia	13	
13	Belgium	12	
14	Austria	26	
15	Greece	16	
16	Montenegro		
17	Germany	18	
18	Poland	23	
19	Latvia	11	
20	Romania	20	
21	Spain	9	2
22	Hungary	19	
23	Georgia	14	
24	Azerbaijan	3	8
25	Russia	4	7
26	Albania	2	10
27	Italy	5	6
