= Serbia in the Eurovision Song Contest 2020 =

- Eurovision Song Contest 2020
- Participating broadcaster: Radio Television of Serbia (RTS)
- Country: Serbia
- Selection process: Beovizija 2020
- Selection date: 1 March 2020

Competing entry
- Song: "Hasta la vista"
- Artist: Hurricane
- Songwriters: Nemanja Antonić; Kosana Stojić; Sanja Vučić

Placement
- Final result: Contest cancelled

Participation chronology

Serbia was set to be represented at the Eurovision Song Contest 2020 with the song "Hasta la vista" written by Nemanja Antonić, Kosana Stojić and Sanja Vučić. The song was performed by the group Hurricane, which among its members included Sanja Vučić who had previously represented Serbia in the Eurovision Song Contest in 2016 where she placed eighteenth with the song "Goodbye (Shelter)". The Serbian national broadcaster, Radio Television of Serbia (RTS) organised the national final Beovizija 2020 in order to select the Serbian entry for the 2020 contest in Rotterdam, Netherlands. The national final consisted of three shows: two semi-finals on 28 and 29 February 2020 and a final on 1 March 2020. Twelve entries competed in each semi-final where the top six qualified to the final from each semi-final following the combination of votes from a five-member jury panel and a public televote. The twelve qualifiers competed in the final which resulted in "Hasta la vista" performed by Hurricane as the winner following the combination of votes from a five-member jury panel and a public televote.

Serbia was drawn to compete in the second semi-final of the Eurovision Song Contest which would have taken place on 14 May 2020. However, the contest was cancelled due to the COVID-19 pandemic.

== Background ==
Prior to the 2020 Contest, Serbia had participated in the Eurovision Song Contest twelve times since its first entry in 2007, winning the contest with their debut entry "Molitva" performed by Marija Šerifović. Since 2007, nine out of twelve of Serbia's entries have featured in the final with the nation failing to qualify in 2009, 2013 and 2017. Serbia's 2019 entry "Kruna" performed by Nevena Božović qualified to the final and placed eighteenth.

The Serbian national broadcaster, Radio Television of Serbia (RTS), broadcasts the event within Serbia and organises the selection process for the nation's entry. RTS confirmed their intentions to participate at the 2020 Eurovision Song Contest on 25 July 2019. Between 2007 and 2009, Serbia used the Beovizija national final in order to select their entry. However, after their 2009 entry, "Cipela" performed by Marko Kon and Milaan, failed to qualify Serbia to the final, the broadcaster shifted their selection strategy to selecting specific composers to create songs for artists. In 2010, RTS selected Goran Bregović to compose songs for a national final featuring three artists, while in 2011 Kornelije Kovač, Aleksandra Kovač and Kristina Kovač were tasked with composing one song each. In 2012, the internal selection of Željko Joksimović and the song "Nije ljubav stvar" secured the country's second highest placing in the contest to this point, placing third. In 2013, RTS returned to an open national final format and organized the Beosong competition. The winning entry, "Ljubav je svuda" performed by Moje 3, failed to qualify Serbia to the final at the Eurovision Song Contest 2013. In 2015, RTS selected Vladimir Graić, the composer of Serbia's 2007 Eurovision Song Contest winning entry "Molitva", to compose songs for a national final featuring three artists. RTS internally selected the Serbian entries in 2016 and 2017 with the decision made by RTS music editors. In 2018 and 2019, RTS returned to using the Beovizija national final in order to select their entry, managing to qualify every year to the final since.

== Before Eurovision ==
=== Beovizija 2020 ===
Beovizija 2020 was the tenth edition of the Beovizija national final organised by RTS in order to select the Serbian entry for the Eurovision Song Contest 2020. The competition simultaneously celebrated the 30th anniversary of the Eurovision Song Contest 1990, the only hosting of the Eurovision Song Contest by the former Yugoslav Radio Television. The selection consisted of two semi-finals featuring twelve songs each to be held on 28 and 29 February 2020, respectively, and a final featuring twelve songs to be held on 1 March 2020. All shows were hosted by Dragana Kosjerina and Jovan Radomir with backstage interviews conducted by Kristina Radenković and Stefan Popović. The three shows were broadcast on RTS1 and RTS Planeta as well as streamed online via the broadcaster's website rts.rs.

==== Competing entries ====
Artists and songwriters were able to submit their entries between 28 August 2019 and 9 December 2019. Artists were required to be Serb citizens and submit entries in one of the official languages of the Republic of Serbia, while songwriters of any nationality were allowed to submit songs. At the closing of the deadline, 90 submissions were received. A selection committee consisting of RTS music editors reviewed the submissions and selected twenty-four entries to proceed to the national final. The selected competing entries were announced on 9 January 2020 and among the competing artists was Sanja Vučić (as part of the group Hurricane) who represented Serbia in the Eurovision Song Contest 2016.

Artist	Song	Songwriter(s)
Ana Milenković	"Tajna" (Тајна)	Dušan Bačić
Andrija Jo	"Oči meduze" (Очи медузе)	Jimmy Jansson, Palle Hammarlund, Andrijano Ajzi
Biljana Đurđević and Amvon Duo	"Raj" (Рај)	Tina Amvon
Bojana Mašković	"Kao muzika" (Као музика)	Goran Kovačić, Bojana Mašković
Balkubano	"Svadba velika" (Свадба велика)	Nikola Burovac, Danijel Đurić
Bane Mojićević	"Cvet sa Prokletija" (Цвет са Проклетија)	Mirko Šenkovski Geronimo
Ejo	"Trag" (Траг)	Stevan Milijanović, Jelena Ćuslović
Hurricane	"Hasta la vista"	Nemanja Antonić, Kosana Stojić, Sanja Vučić
Igor Simić	"Ples za rastanak" (Плес за растанак)	Daniel Kajmakoski, Matej Đakovski, Vladimir Danilović, Boško Čirković
Ivan Kurtić and Mistik Cello	"Sabajle" (Сабајле)	Nikola Burovac, Miloš Roganović
Ivana Jordan	"Vila" (Вила)	Ivana Jordan
Karizma	"Ona me zna" (Она ме зна)	Dušan Janićijević, Dejan Jelisavčić
Lazar Živanović	"Puklo je nebo" (Пукло је небо)	Michael James Day, Adis Eminić
Lift	"Samo mi kaži" (Само ми кажи)	Dimitrije Borčanin, Aleksa Vučković
Marko Marković	"Kolači" (Колачи)	Vladimir Graić, Marko Marković, Nemanja Filipović, Leontina Vukomanović
Milan Bujaković and Olivera Popović	"Niti" (Нити)	Petar Pupić, Milan Bjelica, Luka Racić
Milica Mišić	"Kiša" (Киша)	Sashka Janx
Naiva	"Baš baš" (Баш баш)	Zoran Živanović, Jelena Galonić
Neda Ukraden	"Bomba" (Бомба)	Dušan Bačić, Dejan Nikolić
Nenad Ćeranić	"Veruj u sebe" (Веруј у себе)	Alek Aleksov, Nenad Ćeranić
Rocher Etno Band	"Samo ti umeš to" (Само ти умеш то)	Rastko Aksentijević
Sanja Bogosavljević	"Ne puštam" (Не пуштам)	Sanja Bogosavljević, Kristina Kovač
Srđan Lazić	"Duša i telo" (Душа и тело)	Srđan Lazić, Dejan Ivanović
Thea Devy	"Sudnji dan" (Судњи дан)	Pele Loriano, Beth Morris, Dominic Scott, Ashley Hicklin, Thea Devy, Petar Špirić, Aleksandra Lazarević Špirić

==== Semi-finals ====
Two semi-finals took place at the Studio 8 of RTS in Košutnjak, Belgrade on 28 and 29 February 2020. In each semi-final twelve songs competed and six qualifiers for the final were decided by a combination of votes from a jury panel consisting of Aleksandar Ristić (evrovizija.rs journalist), Natalija Milosavljević (Radio S music editor), Dragoslav Stanisavljević (musician), Ana Štajdohar (singer) and Dragoljub Ilić (composer), and the Serbian public via SMS voting.

In addition to the competing entries, other performances featured during the shows. In semi-final 1, former Eurovision contestants Extra Nena, who represented Yugoslavia in 1992, Milan Stanković, who represented Serbia in 2010, Maya Sar, who represented Bosnia and Herzegovina in 2012, and Tijana Bogićević, who represented Serbia in 2017, were featured as guest performers during the show. In semi-final 2, former Eurovision contestants Bebi Dol, who represented Yugoslavia in 1991, Nevena Božović, who represented Serbia in 2013 as member of the group Moje 3 and in 2019, Tijana Dapčević, who represented Macedonia in 2014, and Sanja Ilić and Balkanika, which represented Serbia in 2018, were featured as guest performers during the show.

Semi-final 1 – 28 February 2020
R/O	Artist	Song	Jury		Televote		Total	Place
R/O	Artist	Song	Votes	Points	Votes	Points	Total	Place
1	Ejo	"Trag"	18	3	1,569	6	9	6
2	Milica Mišić	"Kiša"	20	5	1,325	4	9	7
3	Ivan Kurtić and Mistik Cello	"Sabajle"	10	1	1,147	2	3	10
4	Thea Devy	"Sudnji dan"	38	8	1,541	5	13	5
5	Karizma	"Ona me zna"	8	0	963	0	0	12
6	Andrija Jo	"Oči meduze"	19	4	5,611	12	16	3
7	Sanja Bogosavljević	"Ne puštam"	34	7	940	0	7	8
8	Marko Marković	"Kolači"	42	10	3,066	10	20	1
9	Srđan Lazić	"Duša i telo"	17	2	1,217	3	5	9
10	Neda Ukraden	"Bomba"	23	6	1,848	7	13	4
11	Bilja and Amvon duo	"Raj"	3	0	999	1	1	11
12	Igor Simić	"Ples za rastanak"	58	12	2,939	8	20	2

Detailed Jury Votes – Semi-final 1
R/O	Song	A. Ristić	N. Milosavljević	D. Stanisavljević	A. Štajdohar	D. Ilić	Total
1	"Trag"	5	3	5	2	3	18
2	"Kiša"	3	1	6	5	5	20
3	"Sabajle"		6	3		1	10
4	"Sudnji dan"	10		8	10	10	38
5	"Ona me zna"		4			4	8
6	"Oči meduze"	6	7		6		19
7	"Ne puštam"	8	8	4	7	7	34
8	"Kolači"	4	12	10	8	8	42
9	"Duša i telo"	7	2	2	4	2	17
10	"Bomba"	2	5	7	3	6	23
11	"Raj"	1		1	1		3
12	"Ples za rastanak"	12	10	12	12	12	58

Semi-final 2 – 29 February 2020
R/O	Artist	Song	Jury		Televote		Total	Place
R/O	Artist	Song	Votes	Points	Votes	Points	Total	Place
1	Lift	"Samo mi kaži"	34	6	3,116	10	16	2
2	Bane Mojićević	"Cvet sa Prokletija"	13	3	2,359	7	10	6
3	Balkubano	"Svadba velika"	0	0	949	1	1	11
4	Bojana Mašković	"Kao muzika"	13	2	1,932	4	6	8
5	Naiva	"Baš, baš"	44	8	2,255	6	14	4
6	Rocher Etno Band	"Samo ti umeš to"	2	0	1,154	3	3	10
7	Lazar Živanović	"Puklo je nebo"	5	1	787	0	1	12
8	Ivana Jordan	"Vila"	38	7	866	0	7	7
9	Nenad Ćeranić	"Veruj u sebe"	21	4	1,017	2	6	9
10	Hurricane	"Hasta la vista"	49	12	7,230	12	24	1
11	Ana Milenković	"Tajna"	25	5	2,545	8	13	5
12	Milan Bujaković and Olivera Popović	"Niti"	46	10	2,246	5	15	3

Detailed Jury Votes – Semi-final 2
R/O	Song	A. Ristić	N. Milosavljević	D. Stanisavljević	A. Štajdohar	D. Ilić	Total
1	"Samo mi kaži"	6	8	4	10	6	34
2	"Cvet sa Prokletija"	2	5	2	2	2	13
3	"Svadba velika"						0
4	"Kao muzika"	1	2	3	3	4	13
5	"Baš, baš"	7	10	12	7	8	44
6	"Samo ti umeš to"			1	1		2
7	"Puklo je nebo"	3	1			1	5
8	"Vila"	10	7	8	6	7	38
9	"Veruj u sebe"	4	3	6	5	3	21
10	"Hasta la vista"	8	12	7	12	10	49
11	"Tajna"	5	6	5	4	5	25
12	"Niti"	12	4	10	8	12	46

==== Final ====
The final took place at the Studio 8 of RTS in Košutnjak, Belgrade on 1 March 2020 and featured the twelve qualifiers from the preceding two semi-finals. The winner, "Hasta la vista" performed by Hurricane, was decided by a combination of votes from a jury panel consisting of Nevena Božović (represented Serbia in the Eurovision Song Contest 2013 as part of Moje 3 and in 2019), Aleksandra Milutinović (composer), Milan Đurđević (musician), Aleksandra Kovač (singer) and Dragan Brajović (composer), and the Serbian public via SMS voting. Former Eurovision contestants Hari Mata Hari, who represented Bosnia and Herzegovina in 2006, Marija Šerifović, who won the contest for Serbia in 2007, Mladen Lukić, which represented Serbia in 2018 as part of the group Balkanika, and singers Ivana Vladović and Olga Popović were featured as guest performers during the show.

Final – 1 March 2020
R/O	Artist	Song	Jury		Televote		Total	Place
R/O	Artist	Song	Votes	Points	Votes	Points	Total	Place
1	Milan Bujaković and Olivera Popović	"Niti"	32	5	2,544	1	6	9
2	Hurricane	"Hasta la vista"	47	12	19,781	12	24	1
3	Neda Ukraden	"Bomba"	36	7	2,965	2	9	7
4	Andrija Jo	"Oči meduze"	8	1	13,582	10	11	4
5	Igor Simić	"Ples za rastanak"	39	10	3,923	4	14	3
6	Thea Devy	"Sudnji dan"	29	4	2,153	0	4	10
7	Ejo	"Trag"	3	0	2,070	0	0	12
8	Lift	"Samo mi kaži"	7	0	3,454	3	3	11
9	Ana Milenković	"Tajna"	10	3	5,710	8	11	5
10	Naiva	"Baš, baš"	37	8	4,825	7	15	2
11	Marko Marković	"Kolači"	32	6	4,506	5	11	6
12	Bane Mojićević	"Cvet sa Prokletija"	10	2	4,650	6	8	8

Detailed Jury Votes – Final
R/O	Song	N. Božović	A. Milutinović	M. Đurđević	A. Kovač	D. Brajović	Total
1	"Niti"	8	6	3	8	7	32
2	"Hasta la vista"	6	12	7	10	12	47
3	"Bomba"	7	3	8	12	6	36
4	"Oči meduze"			4	4		8
5	"Ples za rastanak"	12	8	6	5	8	39
6	"Sudnji dan"	4	5	12	6	2	29
7	"Trag"	1			2		3
8	"Samo mi kaži"		1	1		5	7
9	"Tajna"	2	4		3	1	10
10	"Baš, baš"	5	10	5	7	10	37
11	"Kolači"	10	7	10	1	4	32
12	"Cvet sa Prokletija"	3	2	2		3	10

==== OGAE awards ====
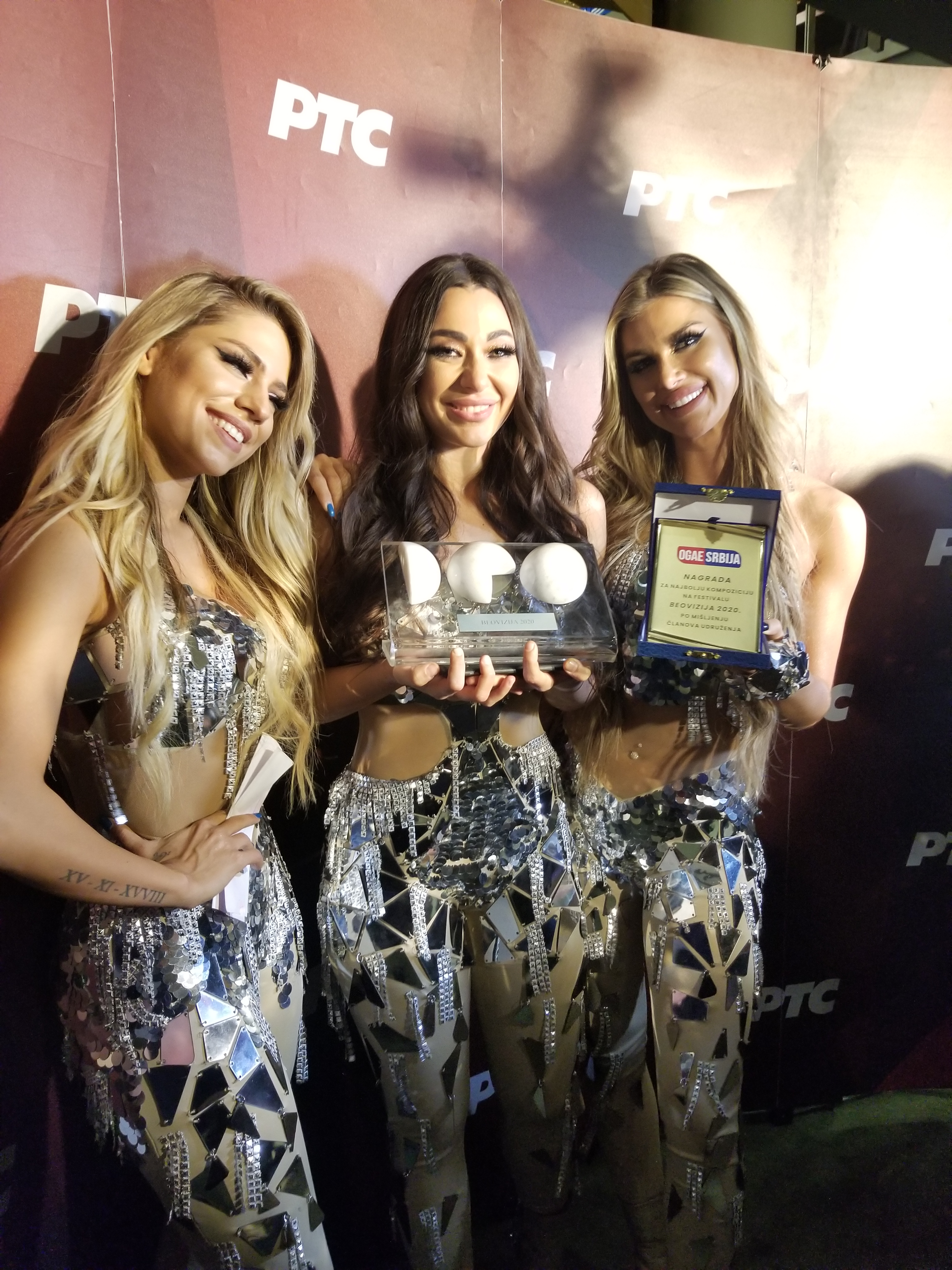
Hurricane with OGAE Serbia Award

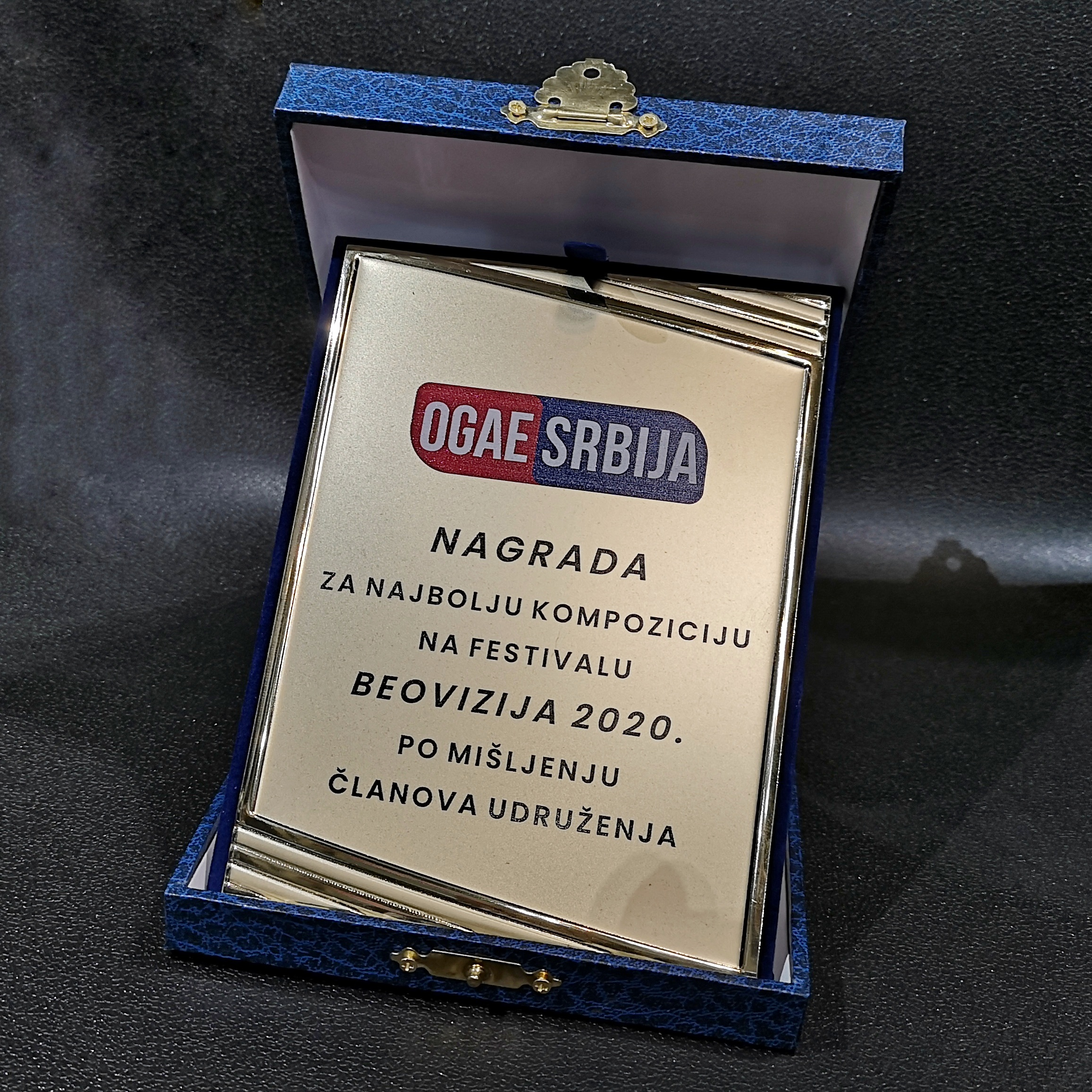
OGAE Serbia Award

Following the event, the fan organisation OGAE Serbia voted on the best song at Beovizija 2020 as decided by association members. The award was won by the winning song "Hasta la vista" with 149 points. Second place, with 103 points, came from the song "Oči Meduze" by Andrija Jo, while third place went to Thea Devy and her song "Sudnji dan" with 84 points. Andrija Jo was also the winner of the OGAE Second Chance, which was awarded after a round of voting with all entries, not including the winning song of the event.

Artist	Song	Points	Place
Hurricane	"Hasta la vista"	149	1
Andrija Jo	"Oči Meduze"	103	2
Thea Devy	"Sudnji dan"	84	3
Neda Ukraden	"Bomba"	78	4
Igor Simić	"Ples za rastanak"	76	5

== At Eurovision ==
According to Eurovision rules, all nations with the exceptions of the host country and the "Big Five" (France, Germany, Italy, Spain and the United Kingdom) are required to qualify from one of two semi-finals in order to compete for the final; the top ten countries from each semi-final progress to the final. The European Broadcasting Union (EBU) split up the competing countries into six different pots based on voting patterns from previous contests, with countries with favourable voting histories put into the same pot. On 28 January 2020, a special allocation draw was held which placed each country into one of the two semi-finals, as well as which half of the show they would perform in. Serbia was placed into the second semi-final, to be held on 14 May 2020, and was scheduled to perform in the first half of the show. However, due to 2019-20 pandemic of Coronavirus, the contest was cancelled.

During the Eurovision Song Celebration YouTube broadcast in place of the semi-finals, it was revealed that Serbia was set to perform in position 7, following the entry from Czech Republic and before the entry from Poland. Whilst footage from the music video shoot was shown before the song was broadcast on Eurovision: Europe Shine a Light, the excerpt of the song aired was from the Beovizija performance.

Jelena Karleusa later performed "Hasta la vista" alongside the group during an online concert later in May 2020. An English language version of "Hasta la vista" was also subsequently released in May 2020.
