= Sanja Vučić =

Serbian singer and songwriter

Sanja Vučić Сања Вучић
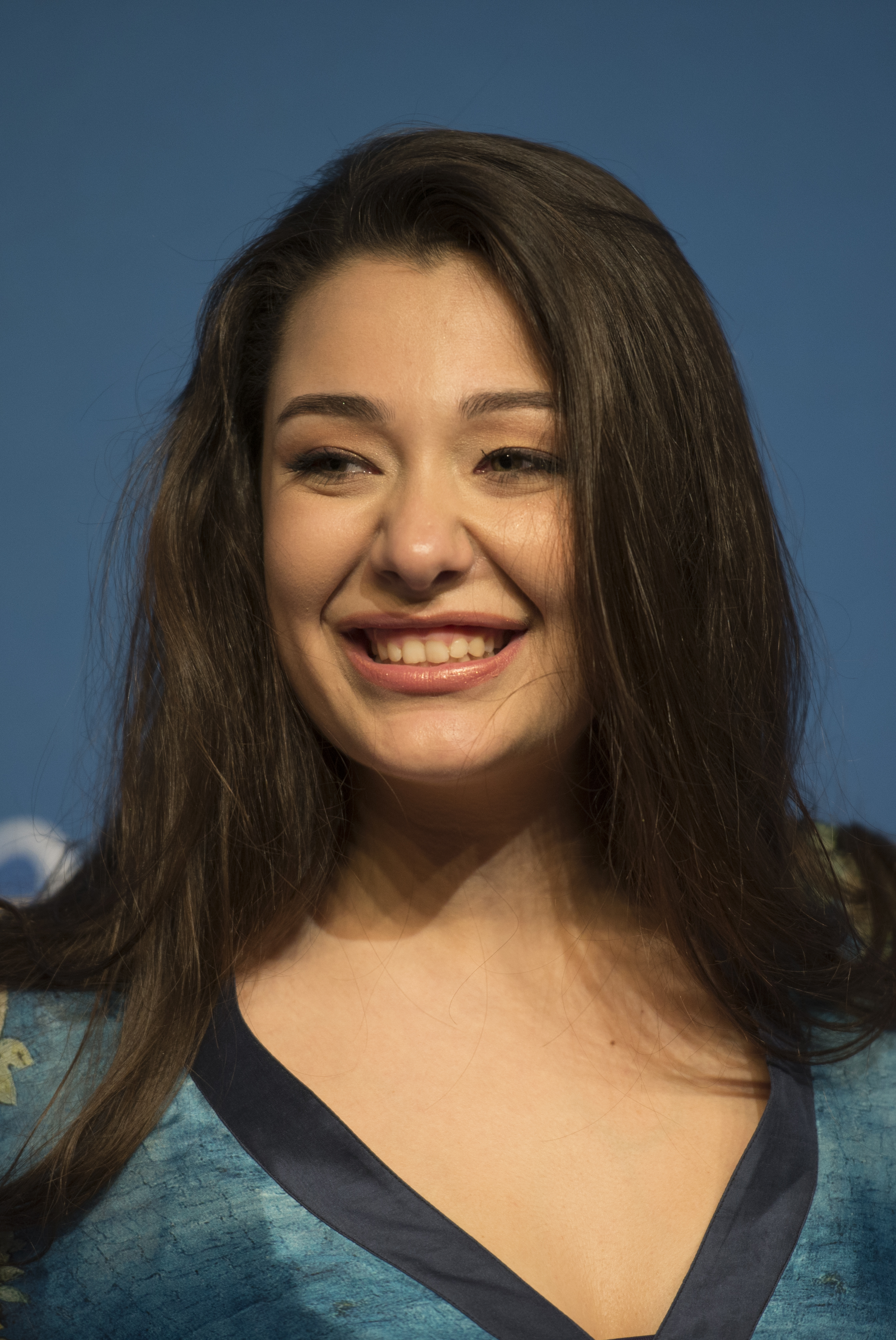
- Vučić in 2016

Background information
- Born: 8 August 1993 (age 33); Kruševac, Serbia, FR Yugoslavia
- Genres: R&B; pop; turbo-folk; electronic; ska; dub; post-rock; jazz
- Occupations: Singer; songwriter
- Instrument: Vocals
- Years active: 2014–present
- Label: Lil Wolf
- Formerly of: ZAA; Hurricane

Sanja Vučić (Serbian Cyrillic: Сања Вучић, pronounced [sâɲa vûtʃitɕ]; born 8 August 1993) is a Serbian singer and songwriter. She began her career as the lead vocalist of the Serbian crossover band ZAA. In 2016, Vučić was selected to represent Serbia at the Eurovision Song Contest with the song "Goodbye". From 2017 to 2022, she was a member of pop folk girl group Hurricane, who represented Serbia in the Eurovision Song Contest 2021 with the song "Loco Loco". She released her first solo album, Remek-delo, in 2023. She has written songs and provided backing vocals for many Serbian artists such as Tea Tairović, Teodora Džehverović, and Nikolija.

== Life and career ==
=== Early career ===
Vučić finished both primary and secondary music school in Kruševac, Serbia at the department of opera singing. During her studies, she sang in various ensembles, ranging from the band performing ethno music Bele vile, to the town jazz orchestra, and in the church choir Saint Prince Lazar.

=== ZAA (2012–2016) ===
The band ZAA was founded in Kruševac in 2008 and Vučić joined in April 2012. Their music is a mix of styles from ska music and dub, to post-rock, jazz and punk. They have performed in over 200 cities throughout the former Yugoslavia, and also performed in Austria, Czechia and Hungary. The band has participated in numerous festivals, like Exit, Nišville, and Reggae Serbia fest. As a member of ZAA, Vučić released an album titled What About (2014).

=== Eurovision Song Contest 2016 ===
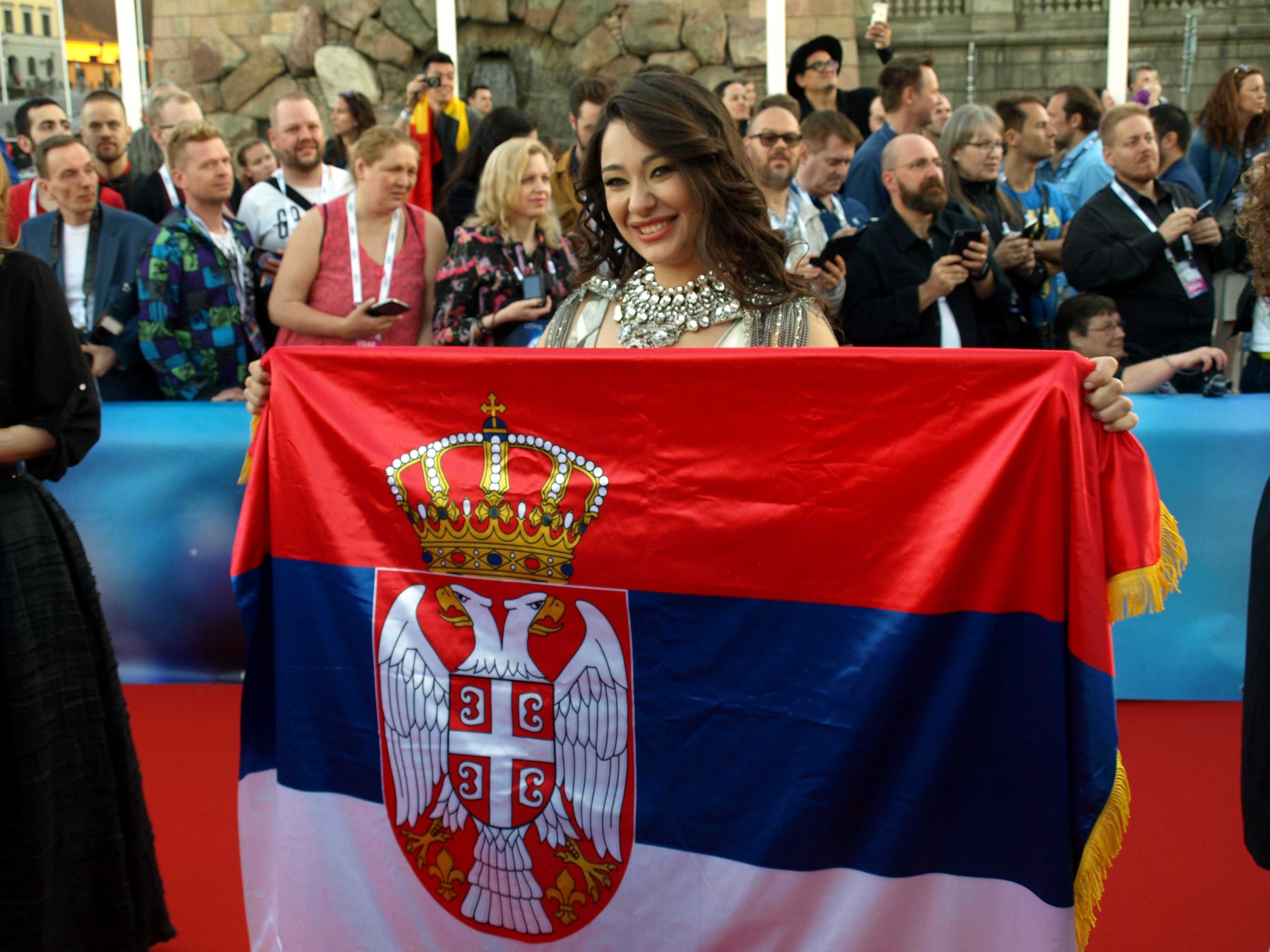
Sanja Vučić with the Serbian flag at the opening ceremony of the Eurovision Song Contest 2016

Radio Television of Serbia internally selected Sanja Vučić for the Eurovision Song Contest 2016 in Stockholm. A press conference with the artist, held by RTS, took place on 7 March 2016 in Košutnjak, Belgrade where it was announced that the song Vučić would perform at the Eurovision Song Contest would be titled "Goodbye (Shelter)" and was written by Serbian singer-songwriter and lead vocalist of the rock band Negative, Ivana Peters.

The Serbian performance at the Eurovision stage featured Sanja Vučić performing together with four backing vocalists and a male ballet dancer. The choreography and staging of the performance interpreted the song's abuse of women in domestic violence message. In the final, Serbia performed in position 15 and placed eighteenth out of the 26 participating countries, scoring 115 points.

Vučić was an international jury member in the Czech national selection process to the Eurovision Song Contest 2018 and in the first semi-final of the selection for the French entry to the Eurovision Song Contest 2019.

=== Hurricane (2017–2022) ===
In 2017, Sanja became a member of the Serbian girl group Hurricane. Their first single, "Irma, Maria", was released shortly afterwards. The group gained regional popularity with the song "Favorito". They participated in the 2020 edition of Beovizija, the Serbian national selection for the Eurovision Song Contest 2020, where they won the competition and were selected to represent Serbia at the Eurovision Song Contest 2020 with the song "Hasta la vista". However, in March the contest was cancelled due to the COVID-19 pandemic in Europe.

In November 2020, it was confirmed that Hurricane would represent Serbia at the Eurovision Song Contest 2021 with the song "Loco loco". At the contest, Hurricane performed in the second semi-final and placed 8th with 124 points, therefore qualifying for the grand final. In the final, they placed 15th in a field of 26 entrants, scoring 102 points. After the contest, "Loco loco" went on to become a hit in the Balkan region.

After the contest, the group released various singles and collaborations. On 4 May 2022, Hurricane announced that they would be disbanding, with its members going on to pursue their solo careers.

=== Solo career (2022–present) ===
On 20 September 2022, Vučić released her first solo single titled "Omađijan". On 29 November of the same year, Vučić released her second solo single "Đerdan", featuring Serbian rapper Nucci. On 19 October 2023, Vučić announced the release of her first solo album called Remek-delo which would be made of eight songs, including another duet with Nucci. The album was released on 31 October 2023.

On 1 July 2024, Vučić released her EP Makadam which contained six songs, including the duet "Marrakesh-Dubai" with Tea Tairović.

On 26 June 2025, Vučić released Trilogy, an EP consisting of three songs.

== Controversies ==
On 20 September 2022, Vučić was a guest on Pink talk show Ami G Show, together with Maja Nikolić, Sajsi MC, Predrag Azdejković and Vesna Vukelić Vendi. Following the 2022 EuroPride, held the previous week in Belgrade, all of the guests stated their opinions on Belgrade Pride, leading to a conflict between the LGBT activist Azdejković and the anti-LGBT Vukelić. Vučić stated: "I am liberal and I believe that everybody needs to express their freedom, and love is love. About the parade itself, I don't want to make a stance." Her hesitance to unequivocally support the parade was met with controversy from her fans. The next day, Vučić took to Instagram and made a statement: "I would like to clarify some things about last night's show, I have to say I was very uncomfortable and I was not used to the tone that the show took in its certain parts, and led by that I wanted to avoid being part of the discourse, primarily because I was a guest on the show for different reasons. (Note: Vučić was a guest on the show to promote her new solo single "Omađijan", released that same day.) I have always been an ally, love and equality will always have my support!"

== Discography ==
=== Albums ===
Title
Remek-delo
Details
- Released: 31 October 2023
- Label: Lil Wolf
- Format: Digital download, streaming
Notes
Track listing
- No.	Title	Length
  1.	"Remek-delo"	3:31
  2.	"Zumbul"	2:54
  3.	"Đene đene"	2:20
  4.	"Ološi"	2:34
  5.	"Lako je njoj"	2:10
  6.	"Kerozin"	2:47
  7.	"Ruzmarin" (with Nucci)	2:57
  8.	"Možda"	2:54
  Total length:		22:07

=== Extended plays ===
Title	Details	Notes
Tri boje zvuka (Live at RTS Studio 8, 2016)	Released: 30 November 2015; Label: RTS Digital; Format: Digital download, streaming	Track listing: | No. | Title | Length | |---|---|---| | 1. | "Crazy in Love" | 3:13 | | 2. | "Hello" | 5:08 | | 3. | "Valerie" | 3:43 | | Total length: | | 12:04 |; All tracks are subtitled "Live at RTS Studio 8, 2016".
Makadam	Released: 2 July 2024; Label: Lil Wolf; Format: Digital download, streaming	Track listing: | No. | Title | Length | |---|---|---| | 1. | "Makadam" | 2:29 | | 2. | "Bailamos" | 2:56 | | 3. | "Magija" | 3:11 | | 4. | "Marrakesh-Dubai" (with Tea Tairović) | 2:36 | | 5. | "Hajde ti" | 2:43 | | 6. | "Oko oko" (with Amar Gile) | 2:46 | | Total length: | | 16:42 |
Trilogy	Released: 27 June 2025; Label: Lil Wolf; Format: Digital download, streaming	Track listing: | No. | Title | Length | |---|---|---| | 1. | "Raspadam se" | 3:11 | | 2. | "Sto problema" | 3:11 | | 3. | "Granit" | 3:09 | | Total length: | | 9:31 |

=== Singles ===
==== As lead artist ====
Title	Year	Peak chart positions	Album
Title	Year	CRO Billb.	Album
"Goodbye (Shelter)" / "Iza osmeha" (as "ZAA" Sanja Vučić)	2016	—	Non-album singles
"Omađijan"	2022	1	Non-album singles
"Đerdan" (with Nucci)	2022	1	Non-album singles
"Hanuma"	2023	20	Non-album singles
"Kriva je kafana" (with Cvija)	2023	21	Non-album singles
"Zelenooka"	2023	—	Non-album singles
"Znaš li gde je nebo moje" (with Dušan Svilar)	2024	—	Non-album singles
"Schwester" (with Cvija)	2024	—	Non-album singles
"Sviraj trubo" (with THCF and Dejan Petrović Big Band)	2024	—	Non-album singles
"Ela ela" (Serbian or Greek versions)	2026	—	Non-album singles
"Leto nije gotovo"	2026	—	Non-album singles

==== As featured artist ====
Title	Year	Album
"Underground Riot" (with Y.O.X)	2014	Non-album singles
"Želje" (with Mr. Rabbit)	2014	Non-album singles
"Kuća heroja" (Anthem of the Serbian Olympic team)	2016	Non-album singles
"Genesis" (with Meta)	2017	Non-album singles
"Rezervisano" (with Đexon)	2017	Non-album singles
"Šuška se, šuška" (with Dejan Petrović Band)	2018	Non-album singles
"Idi ljubi" (with Gazda Paja)	2023	Non-album singles

=== Other charted songs ===
Title	Year	Peak chart positions	Album
Title	Year	CRO Billb.	Album
"Ruzmarin" (with Nucci)	2023	3	Remek-delo
"Đene đene"	2023	19	Remek-delo
"Vagabundo" (with Nucci)	2024	3	Zamena za bol

== Filmography ==
Title	Year	Notes
Eurovision Song CZ	2018	International jury member
Destination Eurovision	2019	International jury member

== Notes ==
Awards and achievements
Preceded by Bojana Stamenov with "Beauty Never Lies"	Serbia in the Eurovision Song Contest; 2016	Succeeded by Tijana Bogićević with "In Too Deep"
