= Slobodan Šarenac =

Serbian sports journalist

- Слободан Шаренац
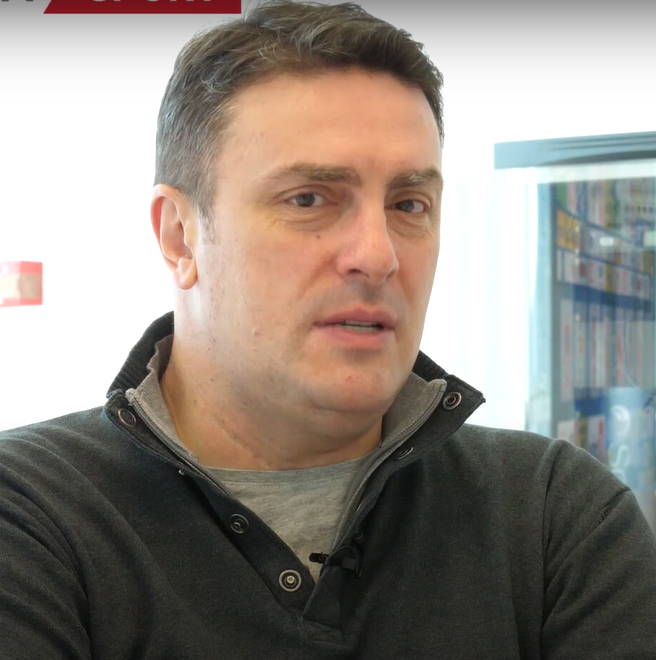
- Šarenac in 2020
- Born: 1968 (age 56–57); Belgrade, SR Serbia, Yugoslavia
- Occupations: Sports commentator; television presenter
- Years active: 1990–present
- Spouse: Anđelija Arbutina
- Children: 2

Slobodan Šarenac (Serbian: Слободан Шаренац; born 1968) is a Serbian sports commentator and television presenter, known for his basketball commentary on Radio Television of Serbia (RTS) and as a co-host of the RTS variety show Šarenica alongside Ana Emić.

== Early life and career ==
Born in Belgrade, Šarenac began his broadcasting career in 1990 with the sports editorial team of the Third Channel. In 1994, he joined the RTS at the invitation of sports editor Marko Marković. He gained wider recognition in 1995 when he provided commentary for the EuroBasket finals in Athens, where Yugoslavia won a gold medal.

Throughout his professional career, Šarenac has covered numerous major sporting events, including ten European Championships, five World Championships, and five Summer Olympic Games - most notably the EuroBasket 2009 and the 2016 Olympics.

In addition to sports broadcasting, Slobodan Šarenac began co-hosting the RTS variety show titled "Šarenica" alongside Ana Emić starting in 2018.

== Personal life ==
Šarenac is married to Anđelija Arbutina, a former Yugoslav and Serbian basketball player. The couple has two daughters.
