= Hurricane (Serbian band) =

Serbian pop folk and R&B girl group

- Band logo

Background information
- Also known as: Hurricane Girls
- Origin: Belgrade, Serbia
- Genres: Pop; folk-pop; contemporary R&B
- Years active: 2017–present
- Label: Stema Production
- Members: Jovana Radić; Sara Kourouma
- Past members: Sanja Vučić; Ivana Nikolić; Ksenija Knežević; Miona Srećković
- Website: www.hurricaneofficial.com

Hurricane, also known as Hurricane Girls, are a Serbian girl group. The original line-up, formed by Zoran Milinković in November 2017, consisted of three members: Sanja Vučić, Ivana Nikolić and Ksenia Knežević. They are best known for representing Serbia at the Eurovision Song Contest 2021 in Rotterdam, Netherlands, with the song "Loco loco". In 2022, the three original members left the group and were replaced by three new members: Jovana Radić, Sara Kourouma and Miona Srećković. In 2024, Srećković left.

== Career ==
They sing mostly in their native language Serbian and have also sung songs in English on some occasions. Hurricane aimed to be recognized globally; they had two planned songs for Universal (as of November 2019), and in September 2018 collaborated with Hollywood producer Stephen Belafonte.

Following their participation in the 2020 edition of Beovizija, they were to represent Serbia in the Eurovision Song Contest 2020, with the song "Hasta la vista". However, on 18 March 2020, the event was cancelled due to the COVID-19 pandemic. On 23 November 2020, it was confirmed that they would remain as the Serbia's representatives in the 2021 contest, and their song "Loco loco", was presented in March 2021. They performed in the second semi-final of the contest on 20 May, where they qualified to the final. In the final, they finished in 15th place, receiving 102 points.

On 4 May 2022, it was announced that the current line-up of the group would part ways after a farewell tour, after which the members would embark on solo careers. It was also announced that the casting process for new members would begin shortly, while retaining the Hurricane name. The group's last single as Vučić, Nikolić and Knežević, "Wow", was released on 19 June 2022.

The group, with its new lineup of Jovana Radić, Sara Kourouma and Miona Srećković participated in Pesma za Evroviziju '23 with the song "Zumi zimi zami" in order to represent Serbia in the Eurovision Song Contest 2023 and placed 12th in the final.

In October 2024, Srećković left the group due to pregnancy, with Hurricane continuing as a duo.

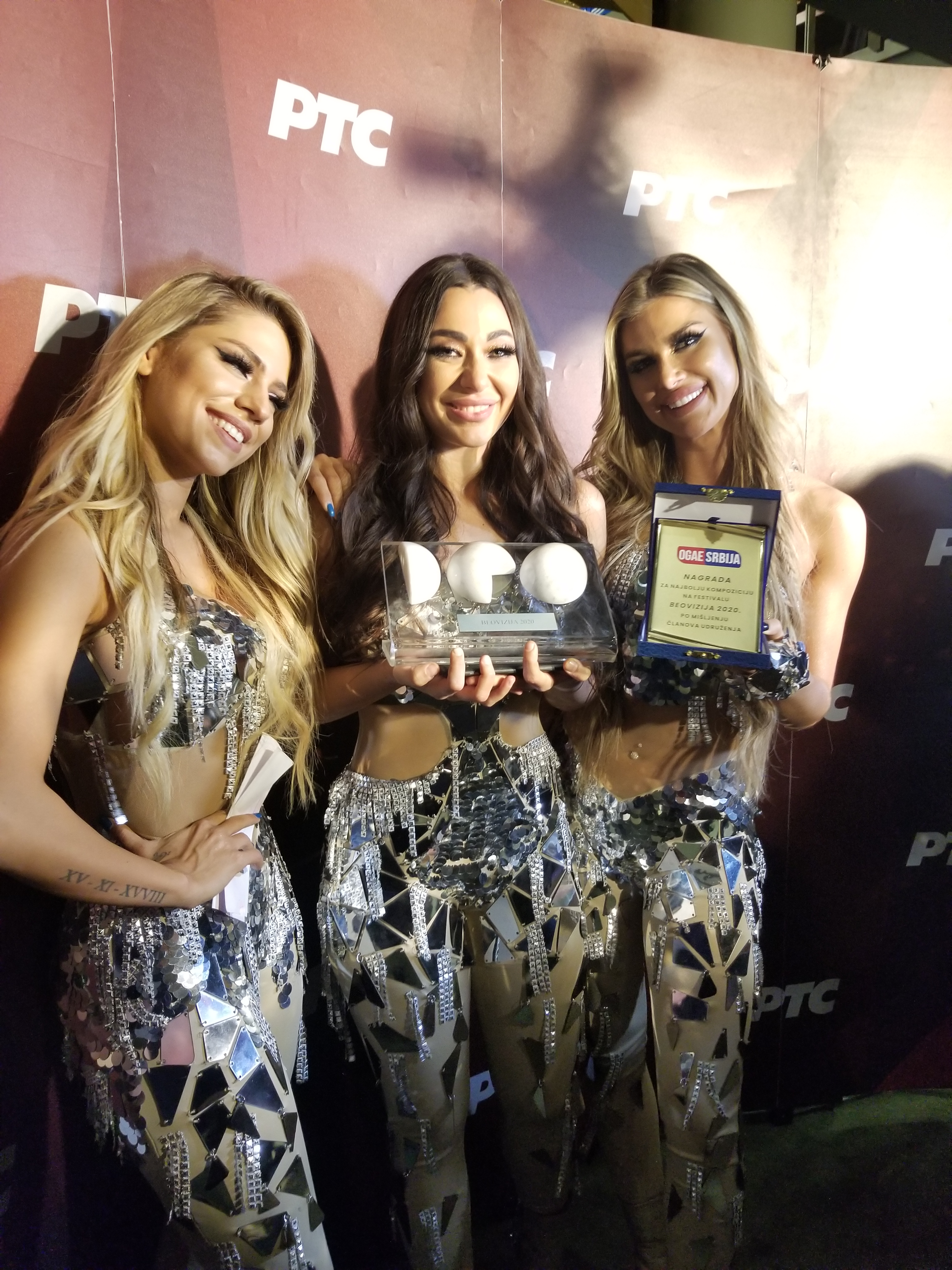
The original lineup of Hurricane (from left to right: Knežević, Vučić and Nikolić) with the Beovizija 2020 trophy

== Lineups ==
Current

- Jovana Radić (2022–present)
- Sara Kourouma (2022–present)

Former

- Sanja Vučić (2017–2022)
- Ivana Nikolić (2017–2022)
- Ksenia Knežević (2017–2022)
- Miona Srećković (2022–2024)

== Discography ==
=== Albums ===
==== Official ====
- IKBMJ

==== Live ====
- Hurricane: Music Live

=== Singles ===
Title	Year	Peak chart positions					
Title	Year	SRB	AUT	CRO		SWE Heat.	
Title	Year	SRB	AUT	Top 40	Songs	SWE Heat.	
"Irma, Maria"	2018	—	—	—	—	—	N/A
"Feel Right"	2018	—	—	—	—	—	N/A
"Personal"	2018	—	—	—	—	—	N/A
"Should've Listened"	2018	—	—	—	—	—	N/A
"Who to Love"	2018	—	—	—	—	—	N/A
"Pain in Your Eyes"	2019	—	—	—	—	—	N/A
"Liar"	2019	—	—	—	—	—	N/A
"Magic Night"	2019	—	—	—	—	—	N/A
"Favorito"	2019	—	—	—	—	—	N/A
"Avantura"	2019	2	—	—	—	—	N/A
"Brzi prsti"	2019	—	—	—	—	—	N/A
"Guallame el pantalón (featuring King Melody)"	2020	—	—	—	—	—	N/A
"Hasta la vista"	2020	—	—	—	—	—	N/A
"Roll the Dice"	2020	—	—	—	—	—	N/A
"Tuturutu" (with MC Stojan)	2020	—	43	—	—	—	N/A
"Folir'o"	2020	—	—	—	—	—	N/A
"Čaje šukarije"	2020	—	—	—	—	—	N/A
"Lopove"	2020	—	—	—	—	—	N/A
"Want Ya"	2020	7	—	—	—	—	N/A
"Loco loco"	2021	6	—	97	—	3	N/A
"Do neba"	2021	6	—	—	—	—	N/A
"Koraci"	2021	1	—	—	—	—	N/A
"Legalan"	2021	4	—	—	—	—	N/A
"Set the World on Fire"	2021	2	—	—	—	—	N/A
"'Ajde bre"	2021	19	—	—	—	—	N/A
"Kontroverzne" (with Teodora)	2022	—	—	—	18	—	N/A
"Gospodine…"	2022	—	—	—	—	—	N/A
"Wow"	2022	—	—	—	—	—	N/A
"Zauvek"	2022	—	—	—	—	—	
"Poljupci u zoru"	2022	—	—	—	2	—	
"Al Capone"	2022	—	—	—	—	—	
"Zumi zimi zami"	2023	—	—	—	—	—	
"Ah lele lele"	2023	—	—	—	—	—	
"Gori štikla"	2023	—	—	—	—	—	
"Leto"	2023	—	—	—	—	—	
"Kako možeš da me ne voliš"	2023	—	—	—	—	—	
"Ustani, budi se"	2023	—	—	—	—	—	
"Na usnama"	2023	—	—	—	—	—	
"Cariño"	2023	—	—	—	—	—	
"Mami papi" (with Ariza)	2023	—	—	—	—	—	
"Sabah"	2024	—	—	—	—	—	
"Bla bla"	2024	—	—	—	—	—	
"Telegram"	2024	—	—	—	—	—	
"Vratiće se on"	2024	—	—	—	—	—	
"Nisi ti za mene" (by ex-Hurricane)	2024	—	—	—	—	—	
"Vozi"	2024	—	—	—	—	—	
"Runde"	2024	—	—	—	—	—	
"Bella ciao"	2024	—	—	—	—	—	
"U amanet"	2025	—	—	—	—	—	
"Nemirno moje"	2025	—	—	—	—	—	IKBMJ
"Podstanar"	2025	—	—	—	—	—	IKBMJ
"Desno levo"	2025						IKBMJ
"Kontrola"	2025						IKBMJ
"—" denotes a single that did not chart or was not released.

Awards and achievements
Preceded by Nevena Božović with "Kruna"	Serbia in the Eurovision Song Contest; 2020 (cancelled)	Succeeded by Themselves with "Loco loco"
Preceded by Themselves with "Hasta la vista"	Serbia in the Eurovision Song Contest; 2021	Succeeded by Konstrakta with "In corpore sano"
