= Ivan Marković =

Ivan Marković may refer to:

- Ivan Marković (footballer, born 1928) (1928–2006), Croatian footballer and football manager
- Ivan Marković (footballer, born 1991), Serbian footballer for Mohammédia
- Ivan Marković (footballer, born 1994), Serbian footballer for FK Rabotnički
- Ivan Markovic (footballer, born 1997), Swiss footballer for FC Spiez
