= Loco Loco =

2021 song by Hurricane

Single by Hurricane
- Language: Serbian
- Released: 5 March 2021
- Length: 2:56
- Label: PGP-RTS
- Composers: Nemanja Antonić; Darko Dimitrov
- Lyricist: Sanja Vučić

Hurricane singles chronology
"Want Ya" (2020)	"Loco Loco" (2021)	"Wild Dances (Cover)" (2021)

Music video
- "Loco Loco" on YouTube

Eurovision Song Contest 2021 entry
- Country: Serbia
- Artist: Hurricane
- Language: Serbian
- Composers: Nemanja Antonić; Darko Dimitrov
- Lyricist: Sanja Vučić

Finals performance
- Semi-final result: 8th
- Semi-final points: 124
- Final result: 15th
- Final points: 102

Entry chronology
- ◄ "Hasta la vista" (2020)
- "In corpore sano" (2022) ►

"Loco Loco" is a song by Serbian girl group Hurricane. The song represented Serbia in the Eurovision Song Contest 2021 in Rotterdam, the Netherlands. The song qualified from the second semi-final on 20 May 2021, and placed 15th in the final with 102 points. Despite receiving low points from the national juries, the song still managed to reach 9th place in the televote and have the premium position of one of the "24 points" member, with North Macedonia giving all of the top marks to "Loco-Loco".

== Eurovision Song Contest ==
=== Internal selection ===
On 17 December 2020, RTS confirmed that Hurricane would represent Serbia in the 2021 contest.

=== At Eurovision ===
The 65th edition of the Eurovision Song Contest took place in Rotterdam, the Netherlands and consisted of two semi-finals on 18 and 20 May 2021, and the grand final on 22 May 2021. According to the Eurovision rules, all participating countries, except the host nation and the "Big Five", consisting of France, Germany, Italy, Spain and the United Kingdom, are required to qualify from one of two semi-finals to compete for the final, although the top 10 countries from the respective semi-final progress to the grand final. On 17 November 2020, it was announced that Serbia would be performing in the first half of the second semi-final of the contest.

== Charts ==
Chart performance for "Loco Loco"
Chart (2021)	Peak position
Croatia International Airplay (HRT)	97
Serbia (Radiomonitor)	6
Sweden Heatseeker (Sverigetopplistan)	3
