= Spusti me na zemlju =

Studio album by Negative
- Released: April 24, 2009
- Recorded: 2008/2009
- Genre: Alternative rock
- Length: 53:26
- Label: City Records

Negative chronology
Tango (2004)	Spusti me na zemlju (2009)

Singles from Spusti me na zemlju
- 1. "Daj mi ritam" Released: October 2009; 2. "Mamin sin" Released: February 2010

Spusti me na zemlju is the fourth, studio album from Serbian rock band Negative. The album was released on April 24, 2009 after a five-year hiatus, and it has a bit more powerful and heavier sound than the previous album. In the beginning of May, it was announced that the first single from the album will be "Daj mi ritam", and the video premiered on MTV Adria.

== Track listing ==
No.	Title	Length
1.	"Mamin sin"	4:16
2.	"Julija"	3:51
3.	"Spusti me na zemlju"	4:42
4.	"Dame biraju"	3:38
5.	"Daj mi ritam"	5:08
6.	"Reci mi da znam"	3:33
7.	"Šta kažeš sad?"	3:34
8.	"Niko nije lud kao ja"	4:01
9.	"Još čekam, ljubavi"	4:04
10.	"Iznenadi me"	3:33
11.	"Ti si laž"	4:43
12.	"Ovakav dan"	4:50
13.	"Spusti me na zemlju Acc"	4:40
