= Negative (Negative album) =

Studio album by Negative
- Released: December 1999
- Recorded: Track 10 recorded Vlada Negovanovic Studios, July 1999; Tracks 1–9 recorded at Studio "O" (Belgrade), August–December 1999
- Genre: Alternative rock
- Length: 30:28
- Label: Automatic Records
- Producer: Mirko Vukomanović (tracks 1–9), Dream Team and Vlada Negovanović (track 10)

Negative chronology
Negative (1999)	Ni ovde ni tamo (2002)

Singles from Negative
- 1. "Ja bih te sanjala" Released: 1999; 2. "Svet tuge" Released: 1999; 3. "Vreme je" Released: 2000; 4. "Oblaci" Released: 2000; 5. "Ti me ne voliš" Released: 2001

Negative is the 1999 debut studio album from influential Serbian rock band Negative. The album was an immediate success, and it included some of the band's greatest hits. Ja bih te sanjala became their signature song. During the next three years, the band had a string of successful singles such as "Ja bih te sanjala", "Oblaci", "Svet tuge", "Ti me ne volis" and "Vreme je". Videos were shot for all the singles from the album.

In May 2000, the band had their first live act in front of several thousand people. The concert was recorded and released on a CD later that year.

== Track listing ==
No.	Title	Length
1.	"Ja bih te sanjala"	3:51
2.	"Vesela"	2:54
3.	"Oblaci"	3:00
4.	"Svet tuge"	3:43
5.	"Sex"	3:38
6.	"Ti me ne voliš"	2:36
7.	"Vreme je"	2:35
8.	"Laž"	4:14
9.	"Uspavanka"	3:19
10.	"Barakuda"	2:38
