= Ni ovde ni tamo =

Studio album by Negative
- Released: December 2002
- Recorded: 2001
- Genre: Alternative rock
- Length: 48:02
- Label: PGP-RTS

Negative chronology
Negative (1999)	Ni ovde ni tamo (2002)	Tango (2004)

Singles from Ni ovde ni tamo
- 1. "Kraj" Released: 2001; 2. "Bez promene" Released: 2002

Ni ovde ni tamo is the second studio album from Serbian rock band Negative. It was recorded in 2001, and released in December 2002. The album introduced a new, heavier sound with a completely new, somewhat neo punk visual style of the band. The album helped the band gain popularity among alternative audiences. Public media informally proclaimed this album for their best one because of "harder" and "faster" melody then previous and last one.

Videos were shot for the songs "Bez promene" and "Kraj".

== Track listing ==
No.	Title	Length
1.	"Bez promene"	4:31
2.	"Ni ovde ni tamo"	3:33
3.	"Od stakla"	4:02
4.	"Tuga nema kraj"	4:17
5.	"Nova prilika"	3:41
6.	"Led"	4:43
7.	"Loš dan"	2:37
8.	"Kontakt"	2:24
9.	"Bez straha"	3:24
10.	"Konačan početak"	3:16
11.	"Bajka"	5:34
12.	"Kraj"	3:04
13.	"Live and Let Die" (hidden track)	3:06
