= Stefan Marković =

Stefan or Stevan Marković may refer to:

- Stefan Marković (politician) (1804–1864), Serbian politician
- Stefan Marković (basketball) (born 1988), Serbian basketball player
- Stefan Marković (footballer) (born 1993), Serbian football player
- Stevan Marković (bodyguard) (1937–1968), murdered Serbian bodyguard of movie star Alain Delon
- Stevan Marković (footballer) (born 1988), Montenegrin football player
