= Ivan Markovic (footballer, born 1997) =

Swiss footballer

Personal information
- Full name: Ivan Markovic
- Date of birth: 15 June 1997 (age 29)
- Place of birth: Thun, Switzerland
- Height: 1.82 m (6 ft 0 in)
- Position: Forward

Team information
- Current team: FC Hünibach
- Number: 42

Youth career
- FC Spiez
- FC Thun

Senior career*
Years	Team	Apps	(Gls)
2013–2018	FC Thun II	62	(28)
2015–2018	FC Thun	4	(0)
2017–2018	→ FC Naters (loan)	7	(1)
2018–2019	FC Naters	17	(4)
2019–2022	FC Spiez		
2022	FC Hünibach		
- * Club domestic league appearances and goals as of 23:18, 17 October 2019 (UTC)

Ivan Markovic (born 15 June 1997) is a Swiss footballer who plays for FC Hünibach. Markovic is of Croatian descent.
