= Markovići =

Markovići may refer to the following places:

Bosnia and Herzegovina:

- Markovići (Goražde)
- Markovići (Kiseljak)

Croatia:

- Markovići (Vižinada)
