= Tango (Negative album) =

Studio album by Negative
- Released: 2004
- Recorded: 2003–2004
- Genre: Alternative rock
- Length: 48:00
- Label: City Records

Negative chronology
Ni ovde ni tamo (2002)	Tango (2004)	Spusti me na zemlju (2009)

Singles from Tango
- 1. "Zbunjena" Released: 2004; 2. "Tango" Released: 2004; 3. "Pogled na nebo" Released: 2005

Professional ratings
Review scores
Source	Rating
Barikada	5/10 stars
Popboks	5/10 stars

Tango is the third studio album from Serbian rock band Negative. The album was released in 2004 after Negative won the festival Beovizija and ended up 4th in the final selection of Serbia and Montenegro's Eurovision Song Contest representative with the song "Zbunjena". Just like the title suggests, the album introduced a "softer", more romantic Negative than on previous two albums. It became very successful both in Serbia and other Yugoslav republics, although criticized for turning to City Records. Video for Tango became one of the most viewed in former Yugoslavia. It is Ivana Peters's favourite album.

Videos were shot for the songs "Zbunjena", "Tango" and "Pogled na nebo". Scheduled to be shot were the videos for "Jutro posle dodira" and "Carobni napitak", however, this didn't happen due to the pregnancy of the lead singer, Ivana Peters.

== Track listing ==
No.	Title	Length
1.	"Još jedan pokušaj"	3:58
2.	"Jutro posle dodira"	4:38
3.	"Zajedno"	4:04
4.	"Ljubav"	3:28
5.	"Kad se svetla ugase"	4:50
6.	"Superstar"	2:35
7.	"Čarobni napitak"	4:21
8.	"Zbunjena"	3:09
9.	"U inat"	4:38
10.	"Tango"	3:43
11.	"Pogled na nebo"	5:51
12.	"Ti me ne voliš"	2:52
