= Hasta la vista (Hurricane song) =

2020 single by Hurricane

Single by Hurricane
- Released: 2020
- Recorded: 2020
- Genre: Dance-pop, R&B
- Songwriters: Nemanja Antonić; Kosana Stojić; Sanja Vučić

Hurricane singles chronology
"Brzi prsti" (2019)	"Hasta la vista" (2020)	"Guallame El Pantalon" (2020)

Eurovision Song Contest 2020 entry
- Country: Serbia
- Artist: Hurricane
- Languages: Serbian, English, Spanish
- Composer: Nemanja Antonić
- Lyricists: Kosana Stojić; Sanja Vučić

Finals performance
- Semi-final result: Contest cancelled

Entry chronology
- ◄ "Kruna" (2019)
- "Loco loco" (2021) ►

"Hasta la vista" (transl. See you later) is a song by Serbian girl group Hurricane. It was chosen to represent Serbia in the Eurovision Song Contest 2020, that has since been cancelled. Its lyrics, in Serbian save for the title and a line in the second verse, revolve around the subject talking to a lover who has been unfaithful to her. An English language version was released with the same music video and themes.

Whilst footage from the music video shoot was shown before the song was broadcast on Eurovision: Europe Shine a Light, the excerpt of the song aired was from the Beovizija performance.

Jelena Karleusa sang the song alongside them for an online concert later in May 2020.

== Eurovision Song Contest ==
The song was to represent Serbia in the Eurovision Song Contest 2020, after Hurricane was chosen through Beovizija 2020, the national selection process organised by Radio Television of Serbia (RTS) to select Serbia's entry for the Eurovision Song Contest. On 28 January 2020, a special allocation draw was held which placed each country into one of the two semi-finals, as well as which half of the show they would perform in. Serbia was placed into the second semi-final, to be held on 14 May 2020, and was scheduled to perform in the first half of the show. It was revealed during the Eurovision Song Celebration YouTube broadcast that it would have performed 7th in Semi Final 2.
