= Marko Marković =

Serbian sports journalist (1935–2011)

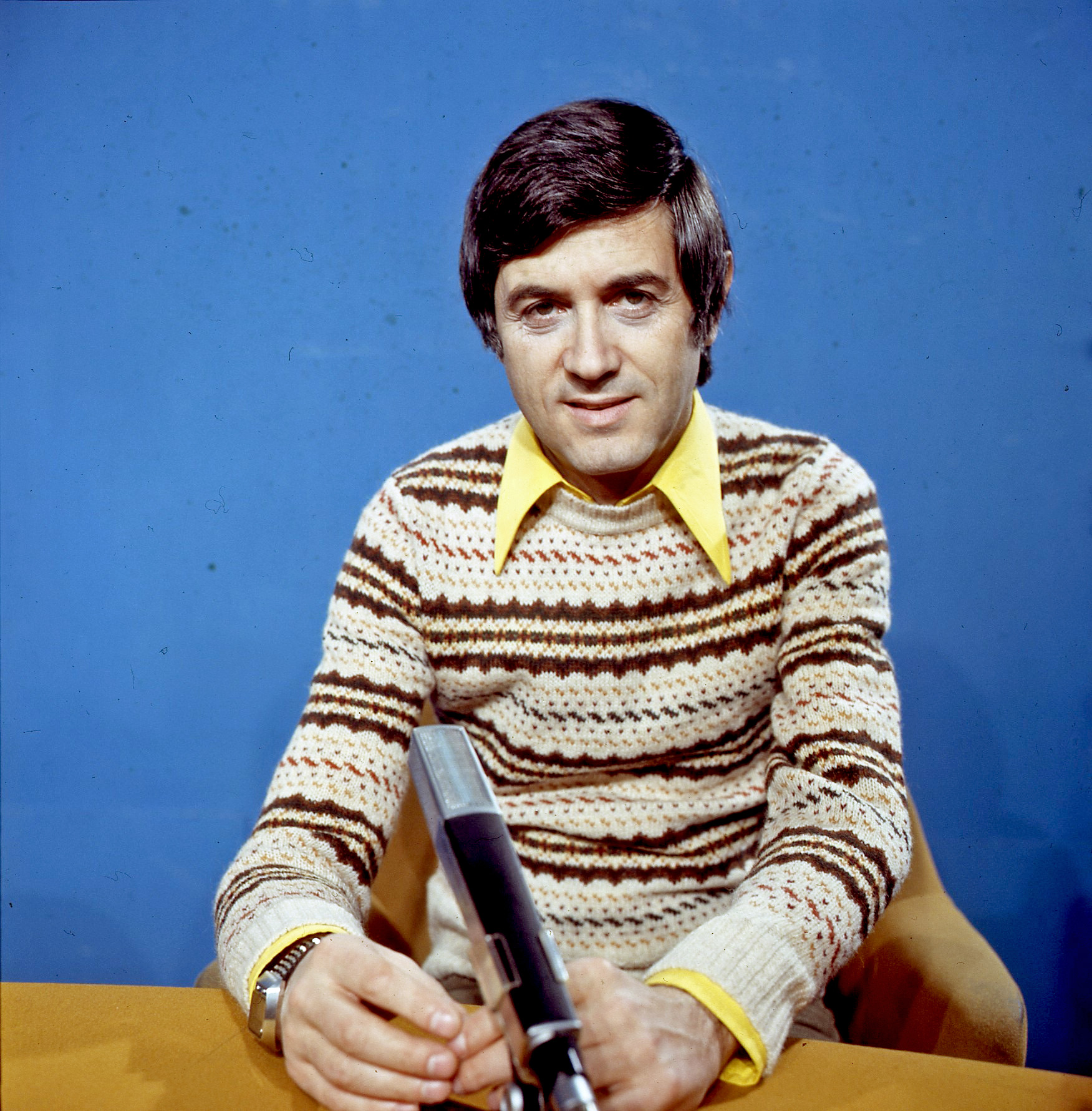
- Marković in 1977
- Born: 26 July 1935; Leskovac, Kingdom of Yugoslavia
- Died: 23 December 2011 (aged 76); Belgrade, Serbia
- Occupation: journalist
- Known for: great contribution to the development of Serbian sport journalism

Marko Marković (Serbian Cyrillic: Марко Марковић; 26 July 1935 – 23 December 2011) was a Serbian sports journalist.

== Biography ==
Marković was born in 1935 in Leskovac, Kingdom of Yugoslavia. In 1957, he started working as a journalist. Most of his journalism career was spent at Radio Television Belgrade (RTB) where he worked from 1961 until 1995. During his time with RTB, he did football play-by-play announcing on radio, covering 40 World and European Championships, as well as The Olympic Games. He furthermore created and hosted Sportski pregled (The Sports Overview) and Sportska subota (Sport Saturday) weekly sports highlights and recap shows that gained enormous popularity and viewership throughout SFR Yugoslavia. creator of many more radio and TV sport programmes, he made countless interviews and wrote six monographs. His flagship programme was Indirekt which aired from 1971 until 1994. The topics, he focused on, were not only the current issues but all those interesting things he span in his own way.

Marković was the editor in chief of the Sports Programme at RTB, sports editor in chief at RTS, and president of The Association of Sports Journalists of the FRY.

From 1995 he worked as the sports editor at RTV Pink. Over the past years, due to his illness, he appeared rarely at Pink.

He was buried in the Alley of Distinguished Citizens at New Cemetery, Belgrade.
