= Goodbye (Shelter) =

2016 song by Sanja Vučić

Single by Sanja Vučić
- Released: 12 March 2016
- Label: PGP RTS
- Songwriter: Ivana Peters
- Composer: Ivana Peters

Sanja Vučić singles chronology
"Goodbye (Shelter)" (2016)	"Omađijan" (2022)

Music video
- "Goodbye (Shelter)" on YouTube

Eurovision Song Contest 2016 entry
- Country: Serbia
- Artist: Sanja Vučić ZAA
- Language: English
- Composer: Ivana Peters
- Lyricist: Ivana Peters

Finals performance
- Semi-final result: 10th
- Semi-final points: 105
- Final result: 18th
- Final points: 115

Entry chronology
- ◄ "Beauty Never Lies" (2015)
- "In Too Deep" (2017) ►

"Goodbye (Shelter)" (Serbian: Збогом (Склониште), lit. 'Zbogom (Sklonište)') is a 2016 song recorded by Serbian singer Sanja Vučić. It was released as a single on 12 March 2016. Ivana Peters wrote the lyrics and composed the music of the song. "Goodbye (Shelter)" represented Serbia in the Eurovision Song Contest 2016 in Stockholm, Sweden after being internally selected by the broadcaster. The song was performed during the second semi-final on 12 May 2016, and qualified for the final, where it placed 18th with 115 points.

== Background ==
"Goodbye (Shelter)" was described by RTS as a love song that carries a message about violence against women. Songwriter Ivana Peters stated: "Violence in any form is unacceptable for me. This song is about destructive love, which turns into a psychological and physical violence at some point. I would like people to recognize it and to start to talk about it. They should not close their eyes. They should react and do something. We all have to find the savior in ourselves. The most important thing is to recognize the strength that you have as a being. The strength that brings love and peace."

== Eurovision Song Contest ==
=== Internal selection ===
RTS internally selected the Serbian entry for the Eurovision Song Contest 2016. The name of the artist to represent Serbia, Sanja Vučić, the lead singer of the group ZAA, was confirmed by RTS on 5 March 2016 after media leaks. A press conference with the artist, held by RTS, took place on 7 March 2016 in Košutnjak, Belgrade where it was announced that the song Vučić would perform at the Eurovision Song Contest would be titled "Goodbye (Shelter)" and was written by Serbian singer-songwriter and lead vocalist of the rock band Negative, Ivana Peters.

=== At Eurovision ===
The Eurovision Song Contest 2016 took place at the Avicii Arena in Stockholm, Sweden and consisted of two semi-finals on 10 and 12 May, and the final on 14 May 2016. According to Eurovision rules, each country, except the host country and the "Big 5" (France, Germany, Italy, Spain and the United Kingdom), was required to qualify from one of two semi-finals to compete for the final; the top ten countries from each semi-final progressed to the final. In January 2016, it was announced that "Goodbye (Shelter)" would be performed 6th, in the first half of the second semi-final of the contest. It performed after Belarus' "Help You Fly" and before Ireland's "Sunlight". The song gained enough points and qualified for the grand final, where it placed 18th with 115 points.

== Reception ==
In their yearly song reviews, Eurovision fansite Wiwibloggs gave the song a score of 6.59 out of 10.
