= Negative (Serbian band) =

Serbian rock band

- Origin: Belgrade, Serbia
- Genres: Power pop; pop rock; alternative rock
- Years active: 1999–present
- Labels: Automatik, PGP-RTS, City Records
- Members: Ivana Peters; Nikola Radaković; Milen Zlatanović; Dario Janošević
- Past members: Vladimir Đurđević; Miloš Bilanović; Vladimir Čukić

Negative (Serbian: Негатив, romanized: Negativ) is a Serbian rock band formed in Belgrade in 1999. Fronted by vocalist Ivana Peters (née Pavlović), the band enjoyed large popularity and was one of the most notable acts of the Serbian rock scene during the 2000s.

== History ==
=== 1999-2015 ===
Negative was formed in the spring of 1999, during the NATO bombing of FR Yugoslavia, by Ivana Pavlović (vocals), Nikola Radaković (guitar), Vladimir "Grle" Đurđević (guitar), Milen Zlatanović (bass guitar) and Miloš Bilanović (drums). Pavlović started her career in the early 1990s as a member of rap group Who Is The Best, and from 1994 to 1999 she was a member of the pop group Tap 011, recording three albums with them.

Negative released their debut self-titled album in 1999. The album was mostly power pop-oriented. The songs for the album were written by the band members and the album producer Mirko Vukomanović, with the exception of the song "Barakuda" ("Barracuda"), written by Zoran "Kiki" Lesendrić and originally recorded by Viktorija. The album brought the hit "Ja bih te sanjala" ("I Would Dream of You"). In 2001 they released the live box set entitled 19 05 00, recorded on their first solo concert in Belgrade's Students' Cultural Centre on 19 May 2000 (thus the album title). The box set featured a live CD featuring, besides the songs recorded on their first album, covers of the international rock hits popular at the time, a VHS featuring a recording of the concert, a t-shirt and an autograph card. During the same year, their song "Kraj" ("The End") appeared on the soundtrack album for Srdan Golubović film Absolute 100.

In 2002 the band released their second album, Ni ovde ni tamo (Neither Here, Nor There), also produced by Mirko Vukomanović and mostly maintaining similar style as their debut, with some songs featuring harder rock sound. In 2004 the band took part in Beovizija 2004 festival with the song "Zbunjena" ("Confused"), placing 1st out of 28 contestants. This qualified them for the Evropesma 2004 contest where they eventually finished in 4th place. Later during the year they released their third studio album, Tango, recorded without Đurđević and featuring Ivana Pavlović on vocals and keyboards. For the first time all the lyrics were written by Pavlović. The album was produced by Ivan Prokop, and featured guest appearances by Aleksandar Nikolić (on bandoneon), Vladan Popović (percussion), Andrija Abramović (violin) and Vladimir Ratković (keyboards). The album brought the hits "Jutro posle dodira" ("The Morning after the Touches") and "Kad se svetla ugase" ("When the Lights go Out"). The album also featured a new version of their old song "Ti me ne voliš" ("You Don't Love Me") and the song "Superstar", featuring lyrics in English language. In 2005 they recorded the theme "Pogled na nebo" ("A View of the Sky") for Nikola Vukčević film A View from Eiffel Tower. After the recording of the theme, the band went on hiatus, during which Ivana Pavlović married to Aleksandar Peters (a former member of the band Sunshine).

The band ended their hiatus by returning to Beovizija in 2007 with the song "Prava stvar" ("The Right Stuff") finishing in 3rd place as the jury's favorite while only coming 8th in the public vote. They also participated at Beovizija 2008, but failed to qualify for the finals. In 2009 the band released its fourth studio album entitled Spusti me na zemlju (Put Me back on the Ground), introducing new drummer, Dario Janošević.

In 2015 the band went on a longer hiatus, during which Ivana Peters participated in the Tap 011 reunion concerts and, in 2017, released a solo single entitled "Reci" ("Say").

=== 2019-present ===
After a four-year hiatus, the band returned to the scene in the spring of 2019 with their performance on Belgrade Beer Fest. The band started their 20th-anniversary tour at the end of 2019, with two concerts held at the BitefArt Cafe in Belgrade. However, most of the dates on the tour were cancelled due to COVID-19 pandemic in Serbia. The band returned to live performances in 2021.

== Legacy ==
In 2021 the album Negative was polled 52nd on the list of 100 Best Serbian Albums Since the Breakup of SFR Yugoslavia. The list was published in the book Kako (ni)je propao rokenrol u Srbiji (How Rock 'n' Roll in Serbia (Didn't) Came to an End).

== Discography ==
=== Studio albums ===
- Negative (1999)
- Ni ovde ni tamo (2002)
- Tango (2004)
- Spusti me na zemlju (2009)

=== Live albums ===
- 19 05 00 (2001)

=== Video albums ===
- 19 05 00 (2001)

== Awards and nominations ==
Year	Award	Category	Result
2010	MTV Europe Music Awards	Best Adriatic Act	Nominated

Awards and achievements
Preceded by Toše Proeski	Beovizija winner 2004	Succeeded by Jelena Tomašević
