= Kruna (song) =

2019 song by Nevena Božović

Single by Nevena Božović
- Released: 20 March 2019
- Recorded: 2018
- Length: 3:05
- Label: PGP RTS
- Songwriter: Nevena Božović
- Producer: Darko Dimitrov

Nevena Božović singles chronology
"What I'm Looking For" (2018)	"Kruna" (2019)	"Sanjam" (2019)

Music video
- "Kruna" on YouTube

Eurovision Song Contest 2019 entry
- Country: Serbia
- Artist: Nevena Božović
- Language: Serbian
- Composers: Nevena Božović, Darko Dimitrov
- Lyricist: Nevena Božović

Finals performance
- Semi-final result: 7th
- Semi-final points: 156
- Final result: 18th
- Final points: 89

Entry chronology
- ◄ "Nova deca" (2018)
- "Hasta la vista" (2020) ►

"Kruna" (Serbian Cyrillic: Круна, pronounced [krûna]; transl. Crown) is a 2019 song recorded by Serbian singer Nevena Božović. It was released for digital download as a single on 20 March 2019. Božović wrote the lyrics and composed the music. "Kruna" represented Serbia in the Eurovision Song Contest 2019 in Tel Aviv, Israel after winning the pre-selection show Beovizija in March 2019. The song was performed during the first semi-final on 14 May 2019, and qualified for the final, where it placed 18th with 89 points.

== Background ==
In an interview with Eurovision fansite Wiwibloggs, the song is dedicated to her fiance, who she was going to marry in a couple of weeks. The lyrics describe how much Božović loves him in the song, vowing that she will belong to her "king" forever and that she will give her life to protect him.

== Music video ==
A music video for "Kruna" was released on 17 April 2019. The video itself has a minimalist style, with the camera mainly focusing on the artist. Throughout the video, the camera zooms out to reveal that Božović is wearing a two-horned tiara and a Wonder Woman-style gauntlet, with Božović making various facial expressions throughout the video. In the climax of the song, spotlights illuminate Božović, before fading to black.

== Eurovision Song Contest ==
=== Beovizija 2019 ===
On 10 January 2019, Nevena Božović was confirmed as one of the 24 participants in Beovizija 2019 with the song "Kruna". On 14 February 2019 the running order was revealed by RTS and Božović was assigned to the sixth slot in the second semi-final. She advanced from the second semi-final on 28 February 2019, after placing first with the jury and second in the public televote. Božović won the national final on 3 March 2019 with a combined total of 20 points and earned the right to represent Serbia in the Eurovision Song Contest 2019 in Tel Aviv, Israel.

=== At Eurovision ===
The Eurovision Song Contest 2019 took place at the Expo Tel Aviv in Tel Aviv, Israel and consisted of two semi-finals on 14 and 16 May, and the final on 18 May 2019. According to Eurovision rules, each country, except the host country and the "Big 5" (France, Germany, Italy, Spain and the United Kingdom), was required to qualify from one of two semi-finals to compete for the final; the top ten countries from each semi-final progressed to the final. In January 2019, it was announced that "Kruna" would be performed 9th, in the first half of the first semi-final of the contest. It performed after Belarus' "Like It" and before Belgium's "Wake Up". The song gained enough votes and qualified for the grand final, where it placed 18th with 89 points.
