= Bosnia and Herzegovina in the Eurovision Song Contest 2016 =

- Eurovision Song Contest 2016
- Country: Bosnia and Herzegovina
- Selection process: Internal selection
- Announcement date: Artist: 25 November 2015; Song: 19 February 2016

Competing entry
- Song: "Ljubav je"
- Artist: Dalal and Deen feat. Ana Rucner and Jala
- Songwriters: Almir Ajanović; Jasmin Fazlić Jala

Placement
- Semi-final result: Failed to qualify (11th)

Participation chronology

Bosnia and Herzegovina was represented at the Eurovision Song Contest 2016 with the song "Ljubav je", written by Almir Ajanović and Jasmin Fazlić Jala. The song was performed by Dalal and Deen featuring Ana Rucner and Jala. In November 2015, the Bosnian broadcaster, Radio and Television of Bosnia and Herzegovina (BHRT), announced it would be returning to the Eurovision Song Contest following a three-year absence, after securing sponsorship to cover both the participation fee and other costs. In the same month, the broadcaster revealed it had internally selected Dalal Midhat-Talakić, Fuad Backović-Deen, Ana Rucner and Jasmin Fazlić Jala to compete in the 2016 contest in Stockholm, Sweden. Their song, "Ljubav je", was presented to the public during a show entitled BH Eurosong Show 2016 on 19 February 2016.

Bosnia and Herzegovina was drawn to compete in the first semi-final of the Eurovision Song Contest which took place on 10 May 2016. Performing during the show in position 17, "Ljubav je" was not announced among the top 10 entries of the first semi-final and therefore did not qualify to compete in the final. This marked the first time that Bosnia and Herzegovina failed to qualify to the final of the Eurovision Song Contest from a semi-final since the introduction of semi-finals in 2004. It was later revealed that Bosnia and Herzegovina placed eleventh out of the 18 participating countries in the semi-final with 104 points.

As of 2026, this was Bosnia and Herzegovina's last entry in the contest, before BHRT opted out of participating the following year. The absence has continued in every edition since.

== Background ==
Prior to the 2016 contest, Bosnia and Herzegovina had participated in the Eurovision Song Contest eighteen times since its first entry in 1993. The nation's best placing in the contest was third, which it achieved in 2006 with the song "Lejla" performed by Hari Mata Hari. Following the introduction of semi-finals for the 2004, Bosnia and Herzegovina had, up to this year, qualified for the final on each occasion the nation has participated. The country's least successful result has been 22nd place, which it achieved in 1996.

The Bosnian national broadcaster, Radio and Television of Bosnia and Herzegovina (BHRT), broadcasts the event within Bosnia and Herzegovina and organises the selection process for the nation's entry. BHRT had selected the Bosnian entry through an internal selection process since 2006. In 2013, the broadcaster withdrew from the competition due to insufficient funds and difficulty securing sponsors to cover the costs of participation. Despite attempts to return to the competition in the subsequent years, financial difficulties led to a three-year absence from the contest. While the financial situation at the broadcaster remained unchanged, on 24 November 2015, BHRT announced that it had secured funding through sponsorship and would therefore return to the Eurovision Song Contest in 2016.

== Before Eurovision ==
=== Internal selection ===
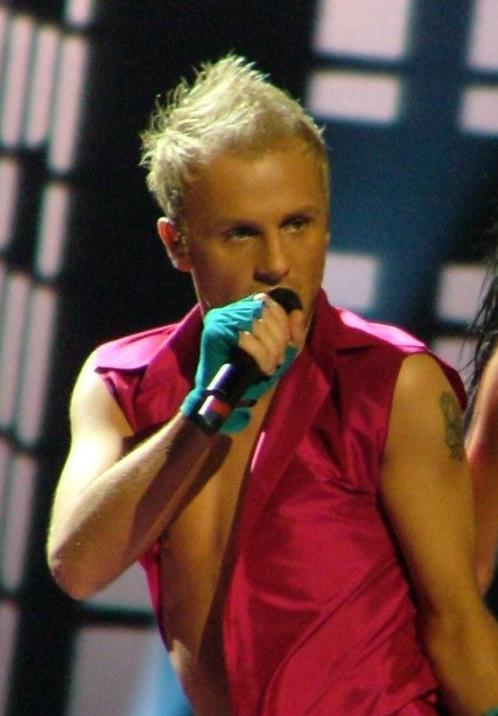
Deen performing "In the Disco" at the Eurovision Song Contest 2004

On 25 November 2015, the broadcaster announced that they had internally selected Dalal Midhat-Talakić and Fuad Backović–Deen to represent Bosnia and Herzegovina in Stockholm. The announcement occurred during a press conference broadcast live on BHT 1 and BH Radio 1, hosted by Maja Miralem and featuring BHRT general director Belmin Karamehmedović, BHT 1 director Mario Vrankić and head of the international department of BHRT Lejla A. Babović. Dalal and Deen are Bosnian singers, the former best known as a member of the duo Erato and the latter having previously represented Bosnia and Herzegovina in the Eurovision Song Contest 2004, placing ninth with the song "In the Disco". During the press conference, it was announced that Dalal and Deen would be joined in Stockholm by Croatian cellist Ana Rucner and Bosnian rapper Jasmin Fazlić Jala. Bosnian singer Zuzi Zu was also announced as part of the supporting stage team for the performance at Eurovision, but later withdrew her participation in the project. The song to be performed at the contest was also selected internally and was written by Almir Ajanović and Jasmin Fazlić Jala. The selection of both the artists and the song came as a proposal from Tempo Production Studio, headed by Almir Ajanović, which offered to finance the entire Eurovision participation along with several sponsors: APU Network (Swedish organisation of Bosnian businesses established by the diaspora), BBI Real Estate, Azel France, Amko Komerc, Farmavita, Lutrija BiH (state lottery), Bosnalijek and the Association of performers and musicians.

The song, "Ljubav je", was presented during a television special entitled BH Eurosong Show 2016 on 19 February 2016, which was held at the Sarajevo City Hall and hosted by Maja Miralem. The show was broadcast on BHT 1 and BH Radio 1 as well as streamed online via the broadcaster's website bhrt.ba and the official Eurovision Song Contest website eurovision.tv. In addition to the presentation of the song, the show featured guest performances by Bosnian boy band Seven Up, 2012 Bosnian Eurovision entrant Maya Sar, 2012 Croatian Eurovision entrant Nina Badrić and Serbian Eurovision Song Contest 2007 winner Marija Šerifović. A Bosnian-language version and English-language version of the song were prepared. BHRT, in consultation with Tempo Production Studio, decided that the song would be performed in Bosnian in the contest.

=== Preparation ===
In early April 2016, the final version of "Ljubav je", featuring a new arrangement, was released together with an instrumental version and an English-language version titled "Love Is All" with lyrics by Tarik Midhat. Dalal, Deen, Ana Rucner and Jala filmed a music video for "Ljubav je" at Ostrožac Castle in the beginning of April. The video, directed by Vedad Jašarević from C4D Production, was released on 14 April.

==== Almir Ajanović controversy ====
During filming for a television show for Hayat TV on 12 April 2016 in which the Bosnian performers participated, the composer of "Ljubav je", Almir Ajanović, was involved in an incident where he reportedly assaulted singer Šaćir Ameti and Jasmin Fazlić Jala. BHRT announced on 14 April that Ajanović would not be travelling to Stockholm together with the rest of the Bosnian delegation after reviewing police reports made in regards to the incident. Ajanović also issued an apology letter for his behaviour and confirmed his withdrawal from further involvement in the project.

=== Promotion ===
Dalal, Deen, Ana Rucner, and Jala made several appearances across Europe to specifically promote "Ljubav je" as the Bosnian Eurovision entry. On 27 February, Dalal and Deen performed during a celebration of the Independence Day of Bosnia and Herzegovina at the Clarion Hotel in Stockholm, Sweden at the invitation of their sponsor, the APU Network. On 4 March, the quartet performed during the presentation show of the 2016 Montenegrin Eurovision entry, U susret Eurosongu, which was held at the Hotel Splendid in Bečići, Montenegro. On 9 April, the Bosnian representatives performed during the Eurovision in Concert event which was held at the Melkweg venue in Amsterdam, Netherlands and hosted by Cornald Maas and Hera Björk. On 26 April, Deen, Dalal and Jala appeared in and performed during a special Eurovision themed edition of the RTV Pink programme Ami G Show in Serbia.

== At Eurovision ==
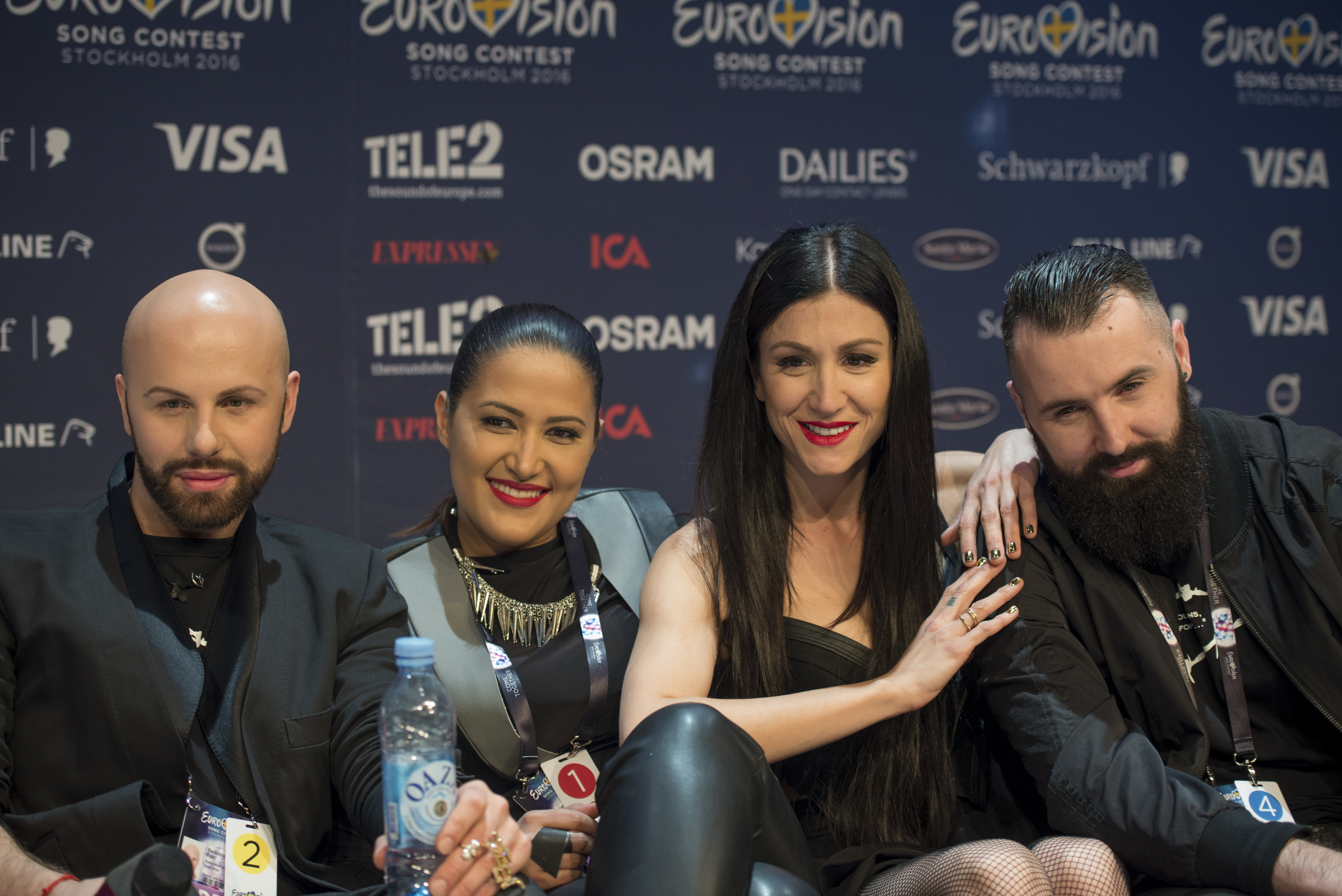
Deen, Dalal, Ana Rucner and Jala during a press meet and greet

According to Eurovision rules, all nations with the exceptions of the host country and the "Big Five" (France, Germany, Italy, Spain and the United Kingdom) are required to qualify from one of two semi-finals in order to compete for the final; the top ten countries from each semi-final progress to the final. The European Broadcasting Union (EBU) split up the competing countries into six different pots based on voting patterns from previous contests, with countries with favourable voting histories put into the same pot. On 25 January 2016, a special allocation draw was held which placed each country into one of the two semi-finals, as well as which half of the show they would perform in. Bosnia and Herzegovina was placed into the first semi-final, to be held on 10 May 2016, and was scheduled to perform in the second half of the show.

Once all the competing songs for the 2016 contest had been released, the running order for the semi-finals was decided by the shows' producers rather than through another draw, so that similar songs were not placed next to each other. Bosnia and Herzegovina was set to perform in position 17, following the entry from Iceland and before the entry from Malta.

The two semi-finals and the final were broadcast in Bosnia and Herzegovina on BHT 1, BHT HD and BH Radio 1 with commentary by Dejan Kukrić. The Bosnian spokesperson, who announced the top 12-point score awarded by the Bosnian jury during the final, was Ivana Crnogorac.

=== Semi-final ===
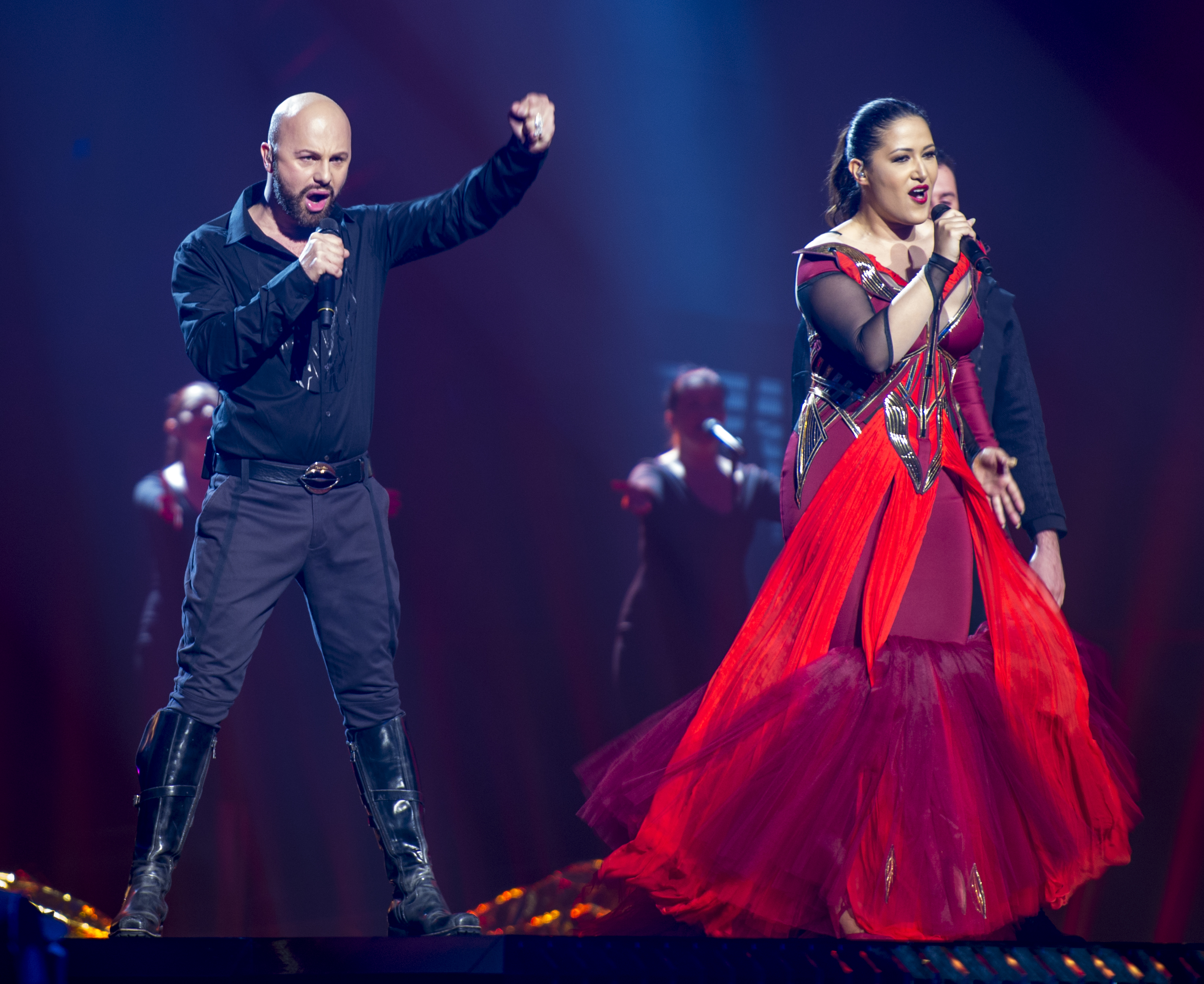
Deen and Dalal during a rehearsal before the first semi-final

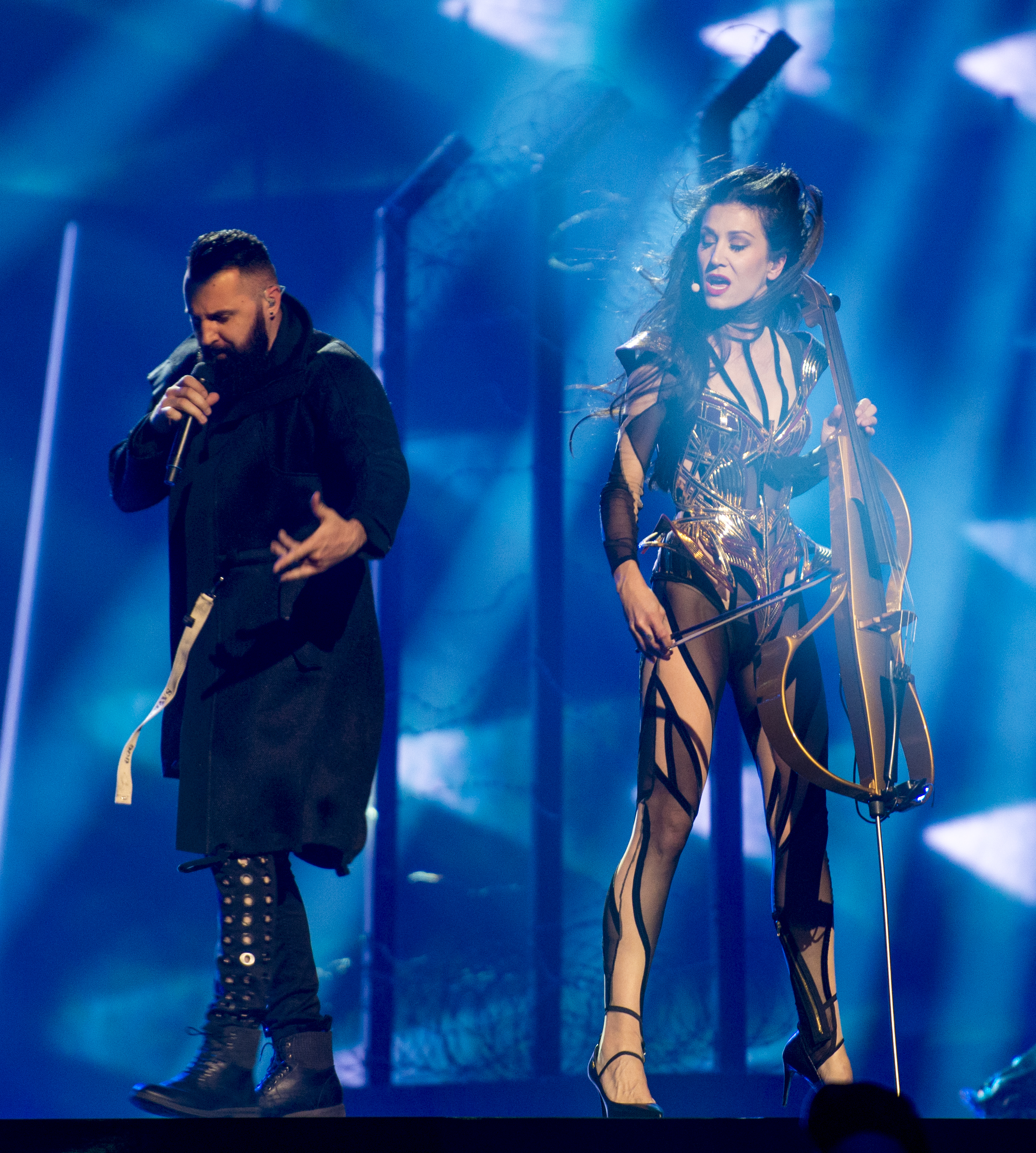
Jala and Ana Rucner during a rehearsal before the first semi-final

Dalal, Deen, Ana Rucner and Jala took part in technical rehearsals on 3 and 6 May, followed by dress rehearsals on 9 and 10 May. This included the jury show on 9 May where the professional juries of each country watched and voted on the competing entries.

The Bosnian performance featured Deen separated by a barbed wire prop from the other performers, who were covered by golden metallic foil. The performance made references to the European migrant crisis and the refugees fleeing Bosnia and Herzegovina during the 1992–1995 Bosnian War. As the performance progressed, the performers were all symbolically reunited. The stage lighting and LED screens displayed predominantly blue colours which transitioned to red. The creative director for the Bosnian performance was Haris Pašović. The black costumes for Deen and Jala were designed by Tom Rebl, while Dalal's red metallic dress and Ana Rucner's metallic black and nude bodysuit were designed by Juraj Zigman. Two backing vocalists join the four performers on stage: Ena Đapo and Zorana Guja.

At the end of the show, Bosnia and Herzegovina was not announced among the top 10 entries in the first semi-final and therefore failed to qualify to compete in the final. This marked the first time that Bosnia and Herzegovina failed to qualify to the final of the Eurovision Song Contest from a semi-final since the introduction of semi-finals in 2004. It was later revealed that Bosnia and Herzegovina placed eleventh in the semi-final, receiving a total of 104 points: 78 points from the televoting and 26 points from the juries.

=== Voting ===
Voting during the three shows was conducted under a new system that involved each country now awarding two sets of points from 1-8, 10 and 12: one from their professional jury and the other from televoting. Each nation's jury consisted of five music industry professionals who are citizens of the country they represent, with their names published before the contest to ensure transparency. This jury judged each entry based on: vocal capacity; the stage performance; the song's composition and originality; and the overall impression by the act. In addition, no member of a national jury was permitted to be related in any way to any of the competing acts in such a way that they cannot vote impartially and independently. The individual rankings of each jury member as well as the nation's televoting results were released shortly after the grand final.

Below is a breakdown of points awarded to Bosnia and Herzegovina and awarded by Bosnia and Herzegovina in the first semi-final and grand final of the contest, and the breakdown of the jury voting and televoting conducted during the two shows:

==== Points awarded to Bosnia and Herzegovina ====
Points awarded to Bosnia and Herzegovina (Semi-final 1)
Score	Televote	Jury
12 points	Austria; Croatia; Montenegro; Sweden	
10 points		Azerbaijan
8 points		
7 points	Czech Republic; Netherlands	
6 points	France	Montenegro
5 points	Azerbaijan	
4 points	San Marino	Croatia
3 points		
2 points		Czech Republic; San Marino
1 point	Armenia	Armenia; Moldova

==== Points awarded by Bosnia and Herzegovina ====
Points awarded by Bosnia and Herzegovina (Semi-final 1)
Score	Televote	Jury
12 points	Croatia	Czech Republic
10 points	Azerbaijan	San Marino
8 points	Montenegro	Russia
7 points	Russia	Armenia
6 points	Austria	Azerbaijan
5 points	Malta	Croatia
4 points	Czech Republic	Hungary
3 points	Armenia	Montenegro
2 points	Cyprus	Malta
1 point	Hungary	Netherlands

Points awarded by Bosnia and Herzegovina (Final)
Score	Televote	Jury
12 points	Serbia	Ukraine
10 points	Croatia	Australia
8 points	Azerbaijan	Serbia
7 points	Ukraine	France
6 points	Russia	Czech Republic
5 points	Austria	Russia
4 points	France	Croatia
3 points	Australia	Bulgaria
2 points	Bulgaria	Armenia
1 point	Hungary	Azerbaijan

==== Detailed voting results ====
The following members comprised the Bosnian jury:

- Alma Čardžić (jury chairperson) – singer, represented Bosnia and Herzegovina in the 1994 contest with Dejan Lazarević and in the 1997 contest
- Đorđe Jovančić – composer, music producer
- Elvir Hadžijamaković – editor, singer, TV host
- Amir Misirlić – music editor
- Ana Babić – opera singer

Detailed voting results from Bosnia and Herzegovina (Semi-final 1)
R/O	Country	Jury							Televote	
R/O	Country	A. Čardžić	Đ. Jovančić	E. Hadžijamaković	A. Misirlić	A. Babić	Rank	Points	Rank	Points
01	Finland	16	11	9	7	17	14		14	
02	Greece	8	10	17	14	7	11		16	
03	Moldova	17	17	15	12	13	16		17	
04	Hungary	5	16	5	13	5	7	4	10	1
05	Croatia	7	8	8	6	9	6	5	1	12
06	Netherlands	10	5	10	17	11	10	1	12	
07	Armenia	3	9	1	5	1	4	7	8	3
08	San Marino	2	7	3	1	4	2	10	11	
09	Russia	4	4	4	2	3	3	8	4	7
10	Czech Republic	1	3	2	3	2	1	12	7	4
11	Cyprus	14	1	16	11	15	13		9	2
12	Austria	15	15	13	16	16	17		5	6
13	Estonia	13	14	14	10	14	15		15	
14	Azerbaijan	9	2	7	4	8	5	6	2	10
15	Montenegro	6	12	6	15	6	8	3	3	8
16	Iceland	11	13	12	9	12	12		13	
17	Bosnia and Herzegovina									
18	Malta	12	6	11	8	10	9	2	6	5

Detailed voting results from Bosnia and Herzegovina (Final)
R/O	Country	Jury							Televote	
R/O	Country	A. Čardžić	Đ. Jovančić	E. Hadžijamaković	A. Misirlić	A. Babić	Rank	Points	Rank	Points
01	Belgium	14	16	12	6	17	12		15	
02	Czech Republic	3	6	8	4	5	5	6	20	
03	Netherlands	18	17	22	22	22	22		21	
04	Azerbaijan	19	5	13	10	15	10	1	3	8
05	Hungary	12	19	14	13	13	13		10	1
06	Italy	22	23	25	23	18	25		18	
07	Israel	20	15	26	11	16	18		24	
08	Bulgaria	4	12	5	12	11	8	3	9	2
09	Sweden	24	20	15	14	20	19		11	
10	Germany	25	14	11	15	12	16		16	
11	France	7	4	4	8	3	4	7	7	4
12	Poland	15	21	16	21	21	20		14	
13	Australia	2	1	2	5	2	2	10	8	3
14	Cyprus	13	8	17	24	19	17		13	
15	Serbia	6	7	3	1	7	3	8	1	12
16	Lithuania	26	25	21	9	25	24		23	
17	Croatia	9	9	9	3	8	7	4	2	10
18	Russia	8	3	10	7	6	6	5	5	6
19	Spain	16	18	7	25	9	15		17	
20	Latvia	11	22	6	16	10	11		22	
21	Ukraine	1	2	1	2	1	1	12	4	7
22	Malta	10	11	18	18	14	14		19	
23	Georgia	23	24	19	17	23	23		26	
24	Austria	21	26	23	26	26	26		6	5
25	United Kingdom	17	13	24	19	24	21		25	
26	Armenia	5	10	20	20	4	9	2	12	
