= Maya Sar =

Bosnian singer-songwriter

- Born: Maja Hodžić; 12 July 1981 (age 45); Tuzla, SR Bosnia and Herzegovina, SFR Yugoslavia
- Education: Sarajevo Music Academy
- Occupations: Singer and songwriter
- Years active: 2009–present
- Spouse: Mahir Sarihodžić (m. 2008)
- Children: 1
- Musical career
- Genres: pop; ballad
- Instrument: vocals
- Labels: City Records; Aquarius Records
- Website: MayaSar.com

Maja Sarihodžić (née Hodžić; Bosnian pronunciation: [mǎːja sǎrixodʒitɕ]; born 12 July 1981), known by her stage name Maya Sar, is a Bosnian singer-songwriter. She represented Bosnia and Herzegovina in the Eurovision Song Contest 2012 with the song "Korake ti znam". Her debut album Krive riječi was released 1 June 2013.

== Early life and education ==
In 2005, Maya Sar graduated with a Bachelor of Music with concentration on piano from University of Sarajevo's Sarajevo Music Academy. Before she started her solo career, Sar was a backing vocalist for many famous singers, including Dino Merlin.

== Career ==
Her first single "Nespretno" (Awkwardly) was released in March 2010 and it became big hit in Bosnia and Herzegovina as well as in neighboring countries.

She is the founder of the regional humanitarian project in the fight against cervical cancer Moj je život moja pjesma (My Life Is My Song) and the composer and songwriter of the eponymous song which is performed by leading some of the leading stars in the region – Nina Badrić, Karolina Gočeva, Aleksandra Radović, and Sar herself. For this, she received the Gold plaque of the great human heart by the International League of Humanists in 2011 and the European award by European Cervical Cancer Association (ECCA) in February 2014.

Sar's debut studio album Krive riječi was released 1 June 2013 through the record label Hayat Production.

== Eurovision ==
Maya Sar participated on Eurovision as a back vocalist in 2004 and 2011 (both times for the Bosnia and Herzegovina entry). She also played the keyboard on Dino Merlin's "Love in Rewind" during the semi-finals and finals at the Eurovision Song Contest 2011.

On 15 December 2011 it was confirmed that Maya Sar would represent Bosnia and Herzegovina with the song "Korake ti znam" in the Eurovision Song Contest 2012 in Baku, Azerbaijan. The song premiered on 15 March 2012. She progressed from the second semi-final into the grand final where she finished in 18th place.

== Personal life ==
Sar met her future husband Mahir Sarihodžić (born June 1974) when she was 16 and he was 23 in 1997. They wed in 2008. Sarihodžić is a music producer and together they own the recording studio "Long Play Studio". They live in Sarajevo.

In addition to her native Bosnian, Sar is fluent in English and Italian.

== Discography ==
- Krive riječi (2013)

Preceded by Dino Merlin with Love in Rewind	Bosnia and Herzegovina in the Eurovision Song Contest; 2012	Succeeded by Dalal & Deen feat. Ana Rucner and Jala with Ljubav je
