= Deen (singer) =

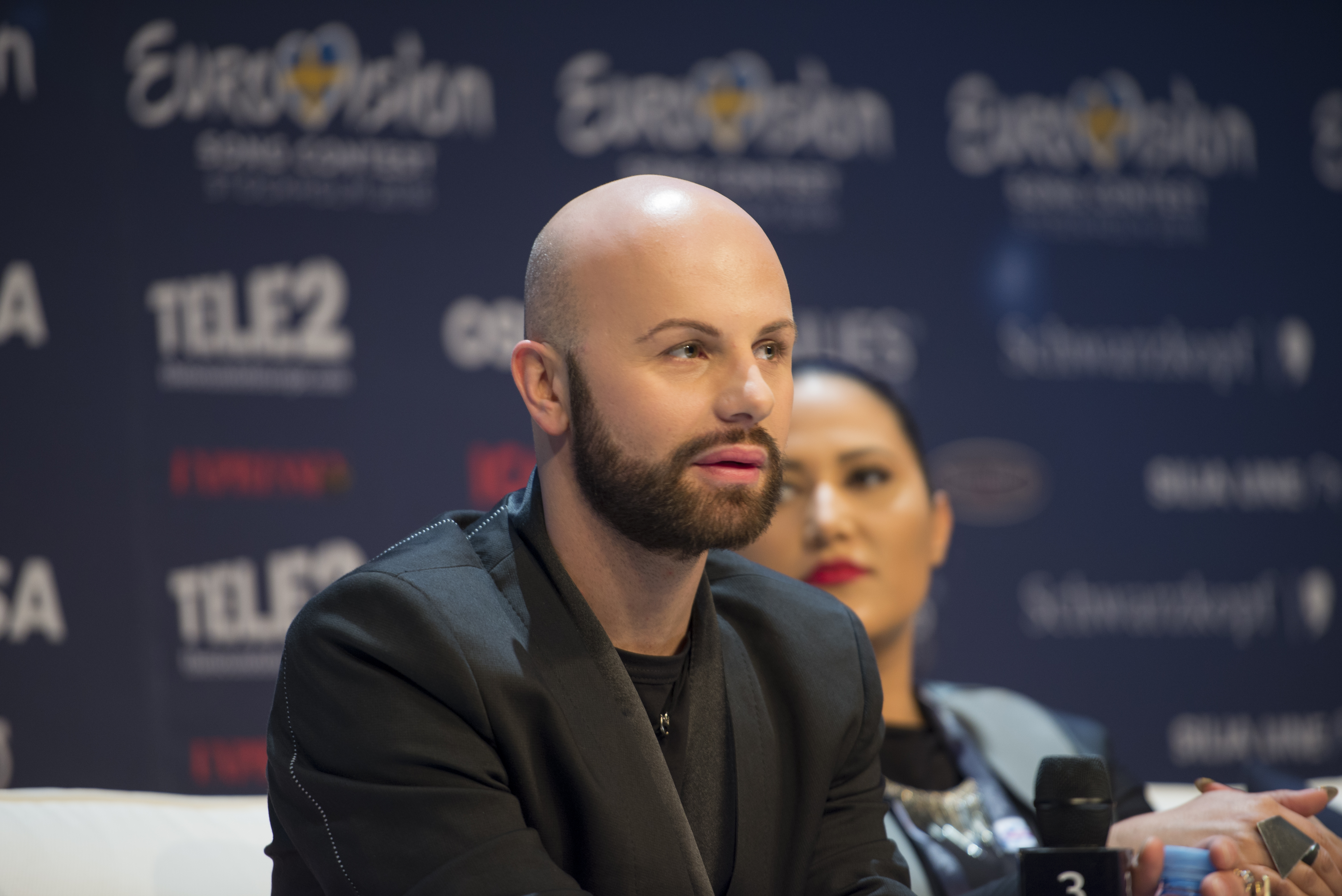
- Deen in 2016
- Born: Fuad Backović; 12 April 1982 (age 44); Sarajevo, SR Bosnia and Herzegovina, SFR Yugoslavia
- Occupations: Singer; fashion designer
- Years active: 1996–2008; 2015–2016
- Musical career
- Genre: Pop
- Instrument: Vocals
- Formerly of: 7Up

Fuad Backović (born 12 April 1982), better known by his stage name Deen, is a Bosnian pop singer, reality star and fashion designer. Backović was the lead singer of the Bosnian boy band 7Up from 1997 until 2002, when he became a solo artist. He represented Bosnia and Herzegovina in the Eurovision Song Contest 2004 with the song "In the Disco".

In 2008, Backović competed on the reality television show Farma. That same year, he retired from music to become a fashion designer, but revived his music career in November 2015 when he agreed to represent his country once again at the Eurovision Song Contest 2016 with the song "Ljubav je" together with Dalal Midhat-Talakić, Ana Rucner and rapper Jala Brat.

== Early life ==
Fuad Backović was born on 12 April 1982 in Sarajevo, Bosnia and Herzegovina, then SFR Yugoslavia. When Backović was two years old, his father Zaim Backović, who worked as a representative of a construction company in Libya, relocated to the North African country for six years. The name Fuad means "heart" in Arabic, while his stage name Deen is taken from the Arabic Dīn meaning "faith". Backović has stated his love for music stems from his mother Sabina, an amateur singer who gave up the prospect of a career in music to get a degree in Economics and later on, to raise a family. Backović has a younger brother named Faris.

The war in Bosnia and Herzegovina from 1992 to 1996, stands out as the most difficult moments in his life. He spent most of the war with his mother, brother, grandparents and other family members in the basement of the family home in the Koševo neighborhood of Sarajevo, while his father was in the battlefield, a soldier in the Army of the Republic of Bosnia and Herzegovina. Following the war, his father became a politician, serving as the Minister of Economy of Bosnia and Herzegovina and a member of the Bosnian parliament.

== Career ==
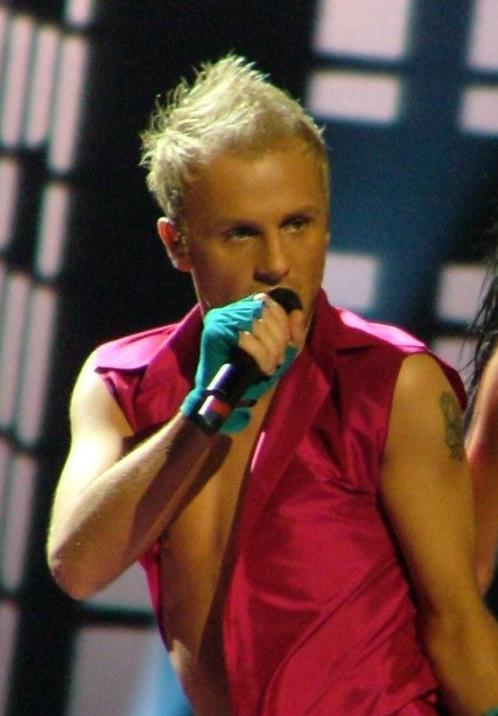
Deen performing at Eurovision 2004.

At the age of 12, Fuad Backović took his first musical steps by recording his first song in 1994. The song was recorded in a musical studio called Studio Number 1 owned by PBSBiH. Gradually his local success grew and obtained the attention of Sarajevo record labels. By 1997, Backović took the opportunity to become the lead singer of the Bosnian boy band 7Up.

The band released two albums, Otvori oči (1998) and Seven (2000). The band enjoyed great success in Bosnia and the neighboring countries Croatia, Serbia and Montenegro. In 1998, Deen received an offer to perform for an opera choir. His vocal abilities had been noticed by the National Theater of Bosnia and Herzegovina, and he accepted the role of the lead singer for the opera choir during the production of Carmina Burana.

Backović decided to leave 7Up and become a solo artist, releasing his first studio album Ja sam vjetar zaljubljeni in 2002. In a 2007 interview he said that being a part of 7Up was an unforgettable experience which left him with many good memories. Backović has been praised for his vocal abilities by people such as Davorin Popović, Kemal Monteno, Hajrudin Varešanović, and many others.

Backović recorded the duet "Poljubi me" (Kiss Me) with the popular Croatian singer Vlatka Pokos.

In 2008, Backović competed on the reality television show Farma. That same year, he retired from music to become a fashion designer, but revived his music career in November 2015 when he agreed to represent his country once again at the Eurovision Song Contest 2016 together with Dalal Midhat-Talakić, Ana Rucner and rapper Jala Brat.

=== Eurovision Song Contest 2004 ===
In 2004, Deen represented Bosnia and Herzegovina at the Eurovision Song Contest 2004 in Istanbul, with the song "In the Disco". Deen finished in ninth place with 91 points automatically earning Bosnia and Herzegovina the honour of participating in the final of the Eurovision Song Contest 2005.

=== Eurovision Song Contest 2016 ===
Fuad represented Bosnia and Herzegovina for the second time at the Eurovision Song Contest 2016, this time in Sweden's capital Stockholm. He was joined by Dalal Midhat-Talakić, Ana Rucner and rapper Jala Brat. They performed the song "Ljubav je" in the second half of the first semi-final, but failed to qualify for the final, making it the first time since the introduction of the semis in 2004 that Bosnia has failed to qualify. After the contest, he retired from the music once again.

== Personal life ==
Backović has lived in Milan, Italy and has graduated from the Istituto Marangoni with a degree in Fashion Business.

Deen now lives in Los Angeles, United States. Backović dodged rumors of his homosexuality for years. When asked by the Bosnian magazine Gracija in September 2010 if he had relocated to Milan to live an openly gay life outside of more conservative Bosnia, he replied that although he knew many gay people, that he was heterosexual. He also stated that he was not open to marriage. Backović was in a possible lavender relationship with Bosnian socialite Hana Hadžiavdagić, who later came out as bisexual.

Since at least 2021, he is in a relationship with his American boyfriend, Will Phearson III.

== Discography ==
- Otvori oči (1998), lead vocal of 7Up
- Seven (2000), lead vocal of 7Up
- Ja sam vjetar zaljubljeni (2002), first solo album
- In the Disco (2004)
- Anđeo sa greškom (2005)
- Ljubav je (2016), with Dalal, Ana Rucner and Jala

Preceded by Mija Martina with "Ne brini"	Bosnia and Herzegovina in the Eurovision Song Contest; 2004	Succeeded by Feminnem with "Call Me"
Preceded by Maya Sar with "Korake ti znam"	Bosnia and Herzegovina in the Eurovision Song Contest; 2016 (with Dalal, Ana Rucner and Jala)	Succeeded by None (the country withdrew from the contest)
