= Dalal Midhat-Talakić =

Bosnian singer (born 1981)

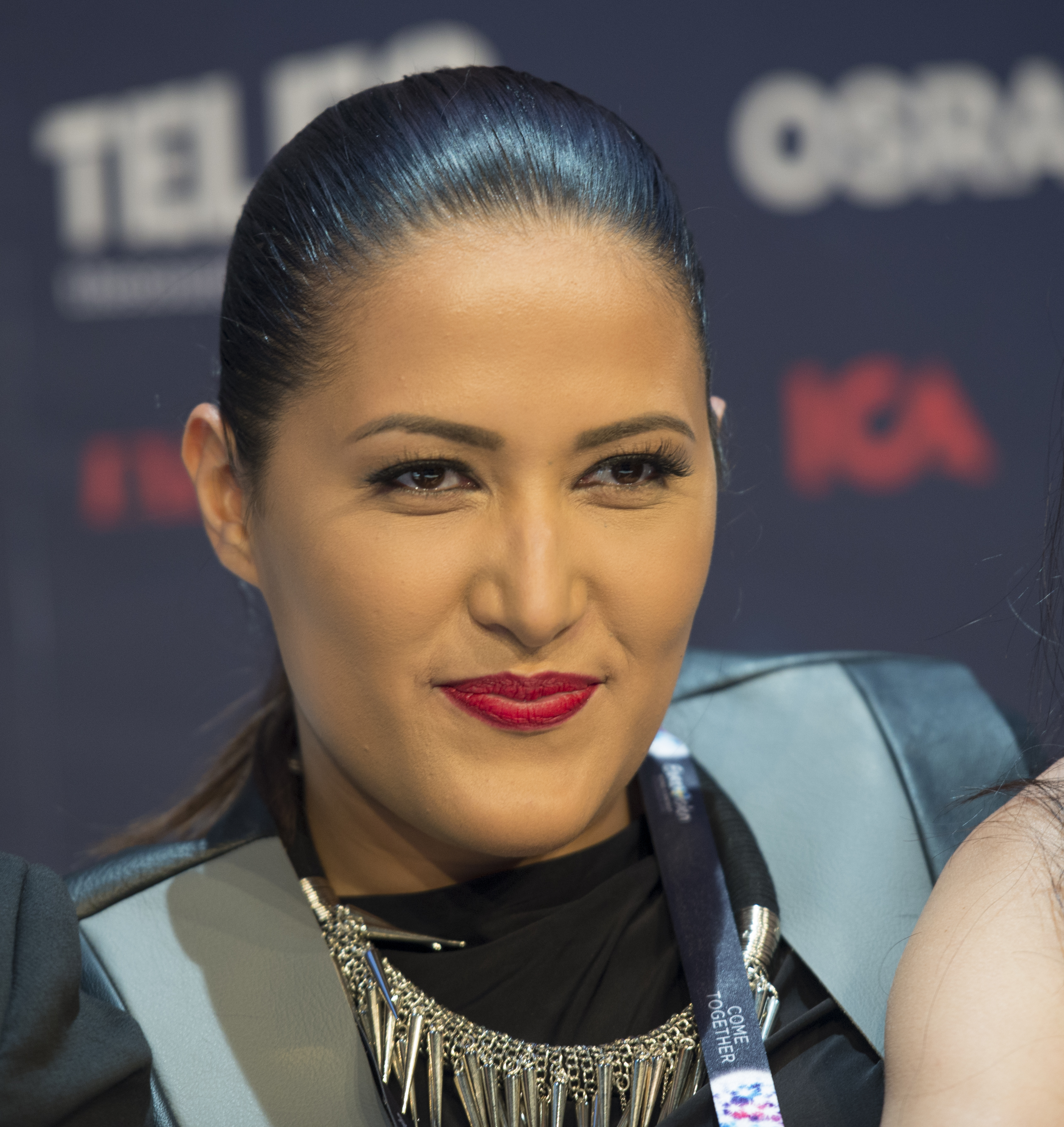
- Midhat-Talakić in 2016

Background information
- Also known as: Dalal; Dalal Midhat
- Born: Dalal Midhat; 5 August 1981 (age 44); Sarajevo, SR Bosnia and Herzegovina, Yugoslavia
- Genres: R&B; pop

Dalal Midhat-Talakić (née Midhat; born 5 August 1981) is a Bosnian singer. She was a member of the Bosnian R&B duo Erato.

She represented Bosnia and Herzegovina in the Eurovision Song Contest 2016 with Deen, Ana Rucner and Jala Brat. Together they performed the song "Ljubav je" on 10 May 2016 during the first semi-final of the competition, but failed to qualify to the 14 May final.

Preceded by Maya Sar with "Korake ti znam"	Bosnia and Herzegovina in the Eurovision Song Contest; 2016 (with Deen, Ana Rucner and Jala)	Succeeded by None (the country withdrew from the contest)
