= Eurovision Song Contest 2016 =

International song competition

- Come Together

Dates and venue
- Semi-final 1: 10 May 2016
- Semi-final 2: 12 May 2016
- Final: 14 May 2016
- Venue: Ericsson Globe; Stockholm, Sweden

Organisation
- Organiser: European Broadcasting Union (EBU)
- Executive supervisor: Jon Ola Sand

Production
- Host broadcaster: Sveriges Television (SVT)
- Directors: Daniel Jelinek; Robin Hofwander; Sven Stojanović
- Executive producers: Johan Bernhagen; Martin Österdahl
- Presenters: Petra Mede; Måns Zelmerlöw

Participants
- Number of entries: 42
- Number of finalists: 26
- Returning countries: Bosnia and Herzegovina; Bulgaria; Croatia; Ukraine
- Disqualified countries: Romania
- Non-returning countries: Portugal
- Participation map: Finalist countries Countries eliminated in the semi-finals Countries disqualified during the contest Countries that participated in the past but not in 2016

Vote
- Voting system: Each country awards two sets of 12, 10, 8–1 points to ten songs.
- Winning song: Ukraine; "1944"

The Eurovision Song Contest 2016 was the 61st edition of the Eurovision Song Contest. It consisted of two semi-finals on 10 and 12 May and a final on 14 May 2016, held at the Ericsson Globe in Stockholm, Sweden, and presented by Petra Mede and Måns Zelmerlöw. It was organised by the European Broadcasting Union (EBU) and host broadcaster Sveriges Television (SVT), which staged the event after winning the 2015 contest for Sweden with the song "Heroes" by Zelmerlöw himself.

Broadcasters from forty-two countries participated in the contest. Bosnia and Herzegovina, Bulgaria, Croatia, and Ukraine returned after absences from recent contests, while Australia also continued participating after debuting as a special guest in 2015. Portugal did not enter, largely due to Rádio e Televisão de Portugal (RTP)'s insufficient promotion of its music-based media, while Televiziunea Română (TVR) had planned to participate for Romania, but it was disqualified due to repeated non-payment of debts to the EBU.

The winner was Ukraine with the song "1944", performed and written by Jamala. Australia, Russia, Bulgaria, and host country Sweden rounded out the top five. This was the first time since the introduction of professional jury voting in 2009 that the overall winner won neither the jury vote, which was won by Australia, nor the televote, which was won by Russia, with Ukraine placing second in both. "1944" is the first song containing lyrics in Crimean Tatar to win the contest. The Czech Republic managed to qualify for the final for the first time in five attempts since its debut in 2007, while both Bosnia and Herzegovina and Greece failed to qualify from the semi-finals for the first time, the latter being absent from the final for the first time since 2000. In the final, Australia's second-place finish was an improvement on its fifth-place finish in 2015, while Bulgaria finished fourth, its best result since its debut and first participation in a final since 2007.

The contest was the first to implement a voting system change since 1975: each country's professional jury points were announced largely as before, while the results of each national televote were combined and announced in reverse order. It was also the first contest to be broadcast on live television in the United States, and the EBU recorded a record-breaking 204 million viewers for the contest, beating the 2015 viewing figures by over 5 million.

== Location ==
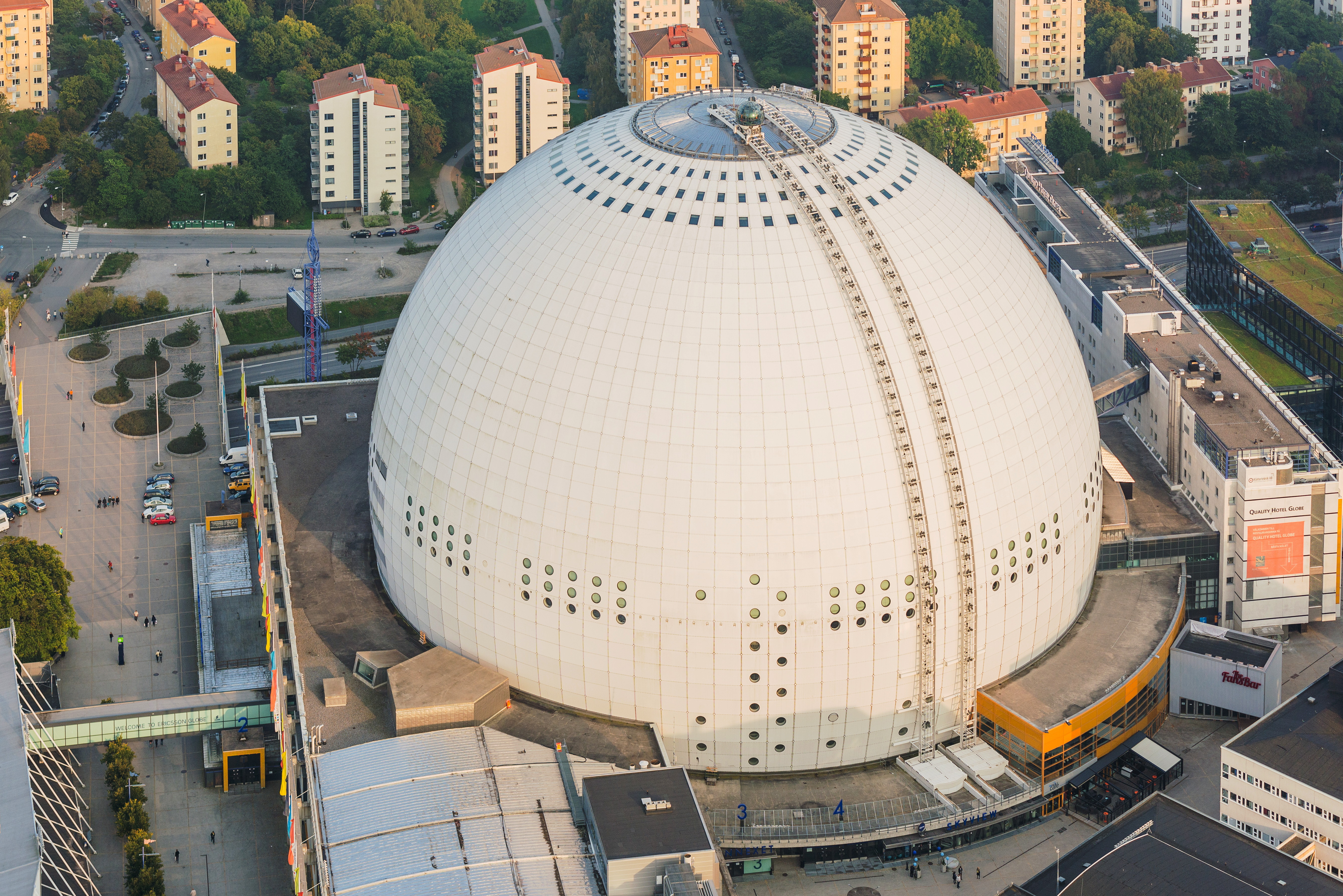
Ericsson Globe, Stockholm - host venue of the 2016 contest

=== Venue ===
The contest took place in the Ericsson Globe in Stockholm, following Sweden's victory at the 2015 contest. The Ericsson Globe has a capacity of approximately 16,000 attendees, and this was the second time the contest has been staged at the venue, after the Eurovision Song Contest 2000.

=== Bidding phase ===
Locations of the candidate cities: the chosen host city is marked in blue, while the eliminated cities are marked in red.

Host broadcaster Sveriges Television (SVT) announced on 24 May, the day after winning the 2015 contest, that the Tele2 Arena in Stockholm was their first choice venue. However, other cities and arenas were invited to apply, and those making a bid had approximately three weeks to submit their offer to SVT.

SVT announced on 1 June the conditions under which cities and venues could announce their interest in hosting the contest:

- SVT had to have access to the venue at least 4–6 weeks before the contest to build the stage and rig up lighting and technology.
- A press centre with a specific size had to be made available at the venue.
- A specific number of hotels and hotel rooms had to be made available in the vicinity of the venue.
- The host city had to be near a major airport.

An announcement regarding the venue was expected from SVT by midsummer, with the Ericsson Globe announced as the venue on 8 July.

Key † Host venue

City	Venue	Notes
Gothenburg	Scandinavium	Venue of the Eurovision Song Contest 1985
Gothenburg	Ullevi	Proposal was dependent on the construction of a roof to cover the stadium. The idea was rejected due to costs.
Linköping	Saab Arena	—
Malmö	Malmö Arena	Venue of the Eurovision Song Contest 2013. Withdrew its bid on 11 June 2015, citing unavailability during the rehearsal weeks of the contest.
Örnsköldsvik	Fjällräven Center	—
Sandviken and Gävle	Göransson Arena	If this option were chosen, Sandviken would have hosted the three live shows in the Göransson Arena, while Gävle would have hosted satellite events such as smaller concerts and shows.
Stockholm
Stockholm	Annexet	—
Stockholm	Globe Arena †	Host venue of the Eurovision Song Contest 2000 and the final of Melodifestivalen in 1989 and between 2002 and 2012 inclusive.
Stockholm	Friends Arena	Venue of the final of Melodifestivalen since 2013. Friends Arena is the biggest football stadium and indoor venue in Sweden and the Nordic countries. However, it was reportedly not part of Stockholm's bid.
Stockholm	Hovet	—
Stockholm	Tele2 Arena	SVT announced on 24 May 2015 that Tele2 Arena was its first choice venue for the contest. However, it was not possible to use the venue due to the 4–6 week organisation requirement, which would impact on the pre-scheduled home games of Hammarby Fotboll.

=== Other sites ===
The Eurovision Village was the official Eurovision Song Contest fan and sponsors' area during the events week. There it was possible to watch performances by local artists, as well as the live shows broadcast from the main venue. Located at Kungsträdgården in Stockholm, it was open from 6 to 13 May 2016.

The EuroClub was the venue for the official after-parties and private performances by contest participants. Unlike the Eurovision Village, access to the EuroClub was restricted to accredited fans, delegates, and press. It was located in a temporary building on the quay next to the water in front of the Royal Palace of Stockholm.

The EBU announced on 14 March 2016 that the Tele2 Arena in Stockholm would host a live event running alongside the final of the contest on 14 May. Eurovision the Party, hosted by Sanna Nielsen, allowed fans to watch the final on a big screen and featured backstage material from the Globe Arena such as Nielsen conducting exclusive interviews and appearing with hosts Petra Mede and Måns Zelmerlöw. The results of the Swedish jury vote was also announced live from the event by Gina Dirawi. A pre-party and after-party was also held and featured performances from former contest winners Carola and Loreen as well as Danny Saucedo, Panetoz and DJ Tim Henri. Executive producer Johan Bernhagen has stated that the event complements existing events being held at the Eurovision Village and the EuroClub, and it is hoped that Eurovision the Party would become an annual event in the host city of the contest.

== Participants ==
Eurovision Song Contest 2016 – Participation summaries by country
- Albania; Armenia; Australia; Austria; Azerbaijan; Belarus; Belgium; Bosnia and Herzegovina; Bulgaria; Croatia; Cyprus; Czech Republic; Denmark; Estonia; Finland; France; Georgia; Germany; Greece; Hungary; Iceland; Ireland; Israel; Italy; Latvia; Lithuania; Macedonia; Malta; Moldova; Montenegro; Netherlands; Norway; Poland; ~~Romania~~; Russia; San Marino; Serbia; Slovenia; Spain; Sweden; Switzerland; Ukraine; United Kingdom

Eligibility for potential participation in the Eurovision Song Contest requires a national broadcaster with active EBU membership capable of receiving the contest via the Eurovision network and broadcasting it live nationwide. The EBU issued an invitation to participate in the contest to all active members and to associate member Special Broadcasting Service (SBS) from Australia.

Participating broadcasters had until 15 September 2015 to submit their applications for participation in the contest, and until 10 October to withdraw their applications without facing financial sanctions. It had been initially announced on 26 November 2015 that 43 countries would participate in the contest, equalling the record number of participants set in 2008 and 2011. However, Romania was disqualified from participation on 22 April 2016, subsequently reducing the number of participating countries to 42.

Four countries returned after absences from recent contests: Bosnia and Herzegovina since 2012, Bulgaria and Croatia since 2013 and Ukraine since 2014. Australia also returned after debuting as a special guest in 2015, but by invitation of the EBU due to the associate membership status of SBS. However, instead of pre-qualifying for the final and voting in all three live shows, as was the case in 2015, Australia entered the second semi-final and voted only in that semi-final and the final. Portugal did not enter, largely due to Rádio e Televisão de Portugal (RTP)'s insufficient promotion of their music-based media, as well as a poorly structured selection process, while Romania was disqualified on 22 April 2016 due to repeated non-payment of debts by Televiziunea Română (TVR) to the EBU.

Seven artists returned after having previously participated in the contest. Deen returned after previously representing Bosnia and Herzegovina in 2004, finishing ninth in the final with the song "In the Disco". Kaliopi returned after previously representing Macedonia in 2012, finishing 13th in the final with the song "Crno i belo". She was also selected to represent Macedonia in 1996 with "Samo ti", but was eliminated in a non-televised pre-qualifying round. Poli Genova returned after previously representing Bulgaria in 2011, finishing 12th in the second semi-final with the song "Na inat". Ira Losco returned after previously representing Malta in 2002, finishing in second place with the song "7th Wonder". Donny Montell returned after previously representing Lithuania in 2012, finishing 14th in the final with the song "Love Is Blind". Greta Salóme returned after previously representing Iceland in 2012 with Jónsi, finishing 20th in the final with the song "Never Forget". Bojan Jovović returned for Montenegro as part of Highway after previously representing Serbia and Montenegro in 2005 as part of No Name, finishing seventh in the final with the song "Zauvijek moja".

Monica, providing backing vocals for Armenia, had previously represented Armenia in Junior Eurovision 2008. Sahlene, providing backing vocals for Australia, had represented Estonia in 2002. Martina Majerle, providing backing vocals for Croatia, had represented Slovenia in 2009 and provided backing vocals for Croatia in 2003, Montenegro in 2008 and 2014, and Slovenia in 2007, 2011, and 2012.

Eurovision Song Contest 2016 participants
Country	Broadcaster	Artist	Song	Language	Songwriter(s)
Albania	RTSH	Eneda Tarifa	"Fairytale"	English	Olsa Toqi
Armenia	AMPTV	Iveta Mukuchyan	"LoveWave"	English	Stephanie Crutchfield; Iveta Mukuchyan; Levon Navasardyan; Lilith Navasardyan
Australia	SBS	Dami Im	"Sound of Silence"	English	Anthony Egizii; David Musumeci
Austria	ORF	Zoë	"Loin d'ici"	French	Christof Straub; Zoë Straub
Azerbaijan	İTV	Samra	"Miracle"	English	Amir Aly; Jakke "T.I Jakke" Erixson; Henrik Wikström
Belarus	BTRC	Ivan	"Help You Fly"	English	Mary Susan Applegate; Victor Drobysh; Alexander Ivanov; Timofei Leontiev
Belgium	VRT	Laura Tesoro	"What's the Pressure"	English	Louis Favre; Sanne Putseys; Birsen Uçar; Yannick Werther
Bosnia and Herzegovina	BHRT	Dalal and Deen feat. Ana Rucner and Jala	"Ljubav je"	Bosnian	Almir Ajanović; Jasmin Fazlić "Jala"
Bulgaria	BNT	Poli Genova	"If Love Was a Crime"	English	Sebastian Arman; Poli Genova; Borislav Milanov; Joacim Persson
Croatia	HRT	Nina Kraljić	"Lighthouse"	English	Andreas Grass; Nikola Paryla
Cyprus	CyBC	Minus One	"Alter Ego"	English	Thomas G:son; Minus One
Czech Republic	ČT	Gabriela Gunčíková	"I Stand"	English	Sara Biglert; Aidan O'Connor; Christian Schneider
Denmark	DR	Lighthouse X	"Soldiers of Love"	English	Søren Bregendal; Daniel Durn; Katrine Klith Andersen; Johannes Nymark; Sebastian Owens; Martin Skriver
Estonia	ERR	Jüri Pootsmann	"Play"	English	Vallo Kikas; Fred Krieger; Stig Rästa
Finland	Yle	Sandhja	"Sing It Away"	English	Heikki Korhonen; Sandhja Kuivalainen; Petri Matara; Milos Rosas; Markus Savijoki
France	France Télévisions	Amir	"J'ai cherché"	French, English	Johan Errami; Amir Haddad; Nazim Khaled
Georgia	GPB	Nika Kocharov and Young Georgian Lolitaz	"Midnight Gold"	English	Thomas G:son; Kote Kalandadze
Germany	NDR (Note: On behalf of the German public broadcasting consortium ARD)	Jamie-Lee	"Ghost"	English	Thomas Burchia; Conrad Hensel; Anna Leyne
Greece	ERT	Argo	"Utopian Land"	English, Greek	Vladimiros Sofianides
Hungary	MTVA	Freddie	"Pioneer"	English	Borbála Csarnai; Zé Szabó
Iceland	RÚV	Greta Salóme	"Hear Them Calling"	English	Greta Salóme Stefánsdóttir
Ireland	RTÉ	Nicky Byrne	"Sunlight"	English	Nicky Byrne; Ronan Hardiman; Wayne Hector
Israel	IBA	Hovi Star	"Made of Stars"	English	Doron Medalie
Italy	RAI	Francesca Michielin	"No Degree of Separation"	Italian, English	Federica Abbate; Cheope; Fabio Gargiulo; Norma Jean Martine; Francesca Michielin
Latvia	LTV	Justs	"Heartbeat"	English	Aminata Savadogo
Lithuania	LRT	Donny Montell	"I've Been Waiting for This Night"	English	Beatrice Robertsson; Jonas Thander
Macedonia	MRT	Kaliopi	"Dona" (Дона)	Macedonian	Romeo Grill; Kaliopi
Malta	PBS	Ira Losco	"Walk on Water"	English	Lisa Desmond; Tim Larsson; Ira Losco; Tobias Lundgren; Molly Pettersson Hammar
Moldova	TRM	Lidia Isac	"Falling Stars"	English	Gabriel Alares; Ellen Berg; Leonid Gutkin; Sebastian Lestapier
Montenegro	RTCG	Highway	"The Real Thing"	English	Maro Market; Srđan Sekulović "Skansi"; Luka Vojvodić
Netherlands	AVROTROS	Douwe Bob	"Slow Down"	English	Matthijs van Duijvenbode; Jan-Peter Hoekstra; Jeroen Overman; Douwe Bob Posthuma
Norway	NRK	Agnete	"Icebreaker"	English	Gabriel Alares; Ian Curnow; Agnete K. Johnsen
Poland	TVP	Michał Szpak	"Color of Your Life"	English	Andy Palmer; Kamil Varen
Russia	RTR	Sergey Lazarev	"You Are the Only One"	English	John Ballard; Ralph Charlie; Dimitris Kontopoulos; Philipp Kirkorov
San Marino	SMRTV	Serhat	"I Didn't Know"	English	Olcayto Ahmet Tuğsuz; Nektarios Tyrakis
Serbia	RTS	Sanja Vučić Zaa	"Goodbye (Shelter)"	English	Ivana Peters
Slovenia	RTVSLO	ManuElla	"Blue and Red"	English	Manuella Brečko; Marjan Hvala; Leon Oblak
Spain	RTVE	Barei	"Say Yay!"	English	Barei; Víctor Púa; Rubén Villanueva
Sweden	SVT	Frans	"If I Were Sorry"	English	Fredrik Andersson; Oscar Fogelström; Frans Jeppsson Wall; Michael Saxell
Switzerland	SRG SSR	Rykka	"The Last of Our Kind"	English	Jeff Dawson; Mike James; Warne Livesey; Christina Maria Rieder
Ukraine	NTU	Jamala	"1944"	English, Crimean Tatar	Jamala
United Kingdom	BBC	Joe and Jake	"You're Not Alone"	English	Justin J. Benson; S. Kanes; Matt Schwartz

=== Other countries ===
==== Active EBU members ====
- Portugal – Rádio e Televisão de Portugal (RTP) had encouraged viewers to suggest changes to their selection process, assuming they had chosen to participate in the contest. Portugal had failed to qualify for the final since 2010, which the majority of the Portuguese public believed to be due to RTP's selection format, Festival da Canção. Kátia Aveiro, sister of Cristiano Ronaldo, had launched a campaign on Twitter asking fans to back her bid to represent Portugal. However, RTP announced on 7 October 2015 that Portugal would not participate in the 2016 contest, adding that they were looking forward to participating in the 2017 contest with a restructured selection process. RTP's ombudsman, Jaime Fernandes, stated on 7 November during the television show A Voz do Cidadão that the decision was due not only to poor results in previous contests, but also RTP's insufficient promotion of music-related content.
- Romania – Romania had originally confirmed their participation in the contest with the song "Moment of Silence", performed by Ovidiu Anton. However, the EBU announced on 22 April 2016 that Televiziunea Română (TVR) had repeatedly failed to pay debts totalling CHF 16 million (€14.56 million) by 20 April, the deadline set by the EBU. TVR's failure to repay their debts resulted in their expulsion from the EBU, and consequently Romania's disqualification from the contest. This led to strong reactions against the decision.

Active EBU member broadcasters in Andorra, Luxembourg, Monaco, Slovakia (despite the country's return to the Eurovision Young Dancers in 2015) and Turkey confirmed non-participation prior to the announcement of the participants list by the EBU. Lebanese broadcaster TL had not ruled out debuting in 2016, but it ultimately did not appear on the final list of participating countries.

==== Associate EBU members ====
The EBU announced on 18 December 2015 that Kazakh broadcaster Khabar Agency would become an associate EBU member on 1 January 2016. However, Kazakhstan would be unable to debut at the contest as eligibility for participation requires a national broadcaster with active EBU membership.

==== Non-EBU members ====
Despite the EBU's positive response to Chinese broadcaster Hunan Television's interest in participating, in June 2015 the union denied that China would debut at the contest. That same month, it was reported that Faroese broadcaster KVF had applied for active EBU membership in order to take part in the contest; the application was rejected due to the islands' membership of the Danish Realm. Despite Kosovo not being recognised by 15 states in Europe and its broadcaster RTK having neither active nor associate EBU membership, Deputy Minister of Foreign Affairs Petrit Selimi tweeted that the country would debut at the 2016 contest, without further elaboration; this was promptly denied by the EBU. Liechtensteiner broadcaster 1FLTV was also unable to debut at the contest due to insufficient funding for EBU membership.

== Format ==
The preliminary dates for the contest were announced on 16 March 2015 at a Heads of Delegation meeting in Vienna, with the semi-finals taking place on 10 and 12 May, and the final on 14 May 2016. These were subject to change depending on SVT, but were later confirmed when Stockholm was announced as the host city.

Discussions were held in 2014 between the EBU and the Asia-Pacific Broadcasting Union (ABU) regarding the inclusion of a guest performance from the ABU TV Song Festival at the contest. The EBU confirmed on 16 July 2015 that they would be looking into the possibility of the proposal, which was discussed at the ABU General Assembly in 2014.

SVT proposed a change of start time of the contest from 21:00 CEST to 20:00 CEST on 9 September, arguing that such a change would help to promote family viewing of the contest, especially in eastern Europe when it would run late into the night. However, the EBU published the public rules of the contest on 28 October, which stated that the start time would remain at 21:00 CEST.

The EBU announced on 23 September that rather than using clips from their respective music videos, extended clips from the dress rehearsals of the six acts who qualified directly to the final (the "Big Five" and host nation Sweden) would be shown as previews during the semi-final in which they were allocated to vote.

The core team for the contest was announced by SVT and the EBU on 26 October. Johan Bernhagen and Martin Österdahl were executive producers, while Tobias Åberg was head of production. The three live shows were directed by Sven Stojanović and the contest was produced by Christer Björkman.

=== New voting system ===
The EBU announced on 18 February 2016 that a new voting system would be implemented at the contest for the first time since 1975. The new system, inspired by the voting system of Melodifestivalen, involved each country awarding two sets of points from 1–8, 10 and 12: one from their professional jury and the other from televoting. Televoting votes from all the countries would be pooled. After viewers cast their votes, the results of each professional jury would be presented, with countries receiving 1–8 and 10 points being displayed on-screen, instead of 1–7 as had been the case since 2006, and the national spokesperson announcing only the country to which they award 12 points. After the results of the professional juries were presented, the televoting points from all participating countries would be combined, providing one score for each song. The new voting system would also be used to determine the qualifiers from each semi-final, but, as before, the qualifiers are announced in a random order.

As the new voting system would give equal weight to jury and televoting results, a national jury result could not be used as a backup result for the televoting or vice versa. Therefore, if a country could not deliver a valid televoting/jury result, a substitute result would be calculated by the jury/televoting result of a pre-selected group of countries approved by the contest's Reference Group. The Director General of Radiotelevisione della Repubblica di San Marino (SMRTV), Carlo Romeo, stated on 23 February that the use of a substitute televoting result discriminated against microstates like San Marino, which only used a professional jury due to their use of the Italian phone system and would therefore have its voting representation diminished under the new system, and criticised the EBU for not contacting its members before making the decision.

=== Presenters ===
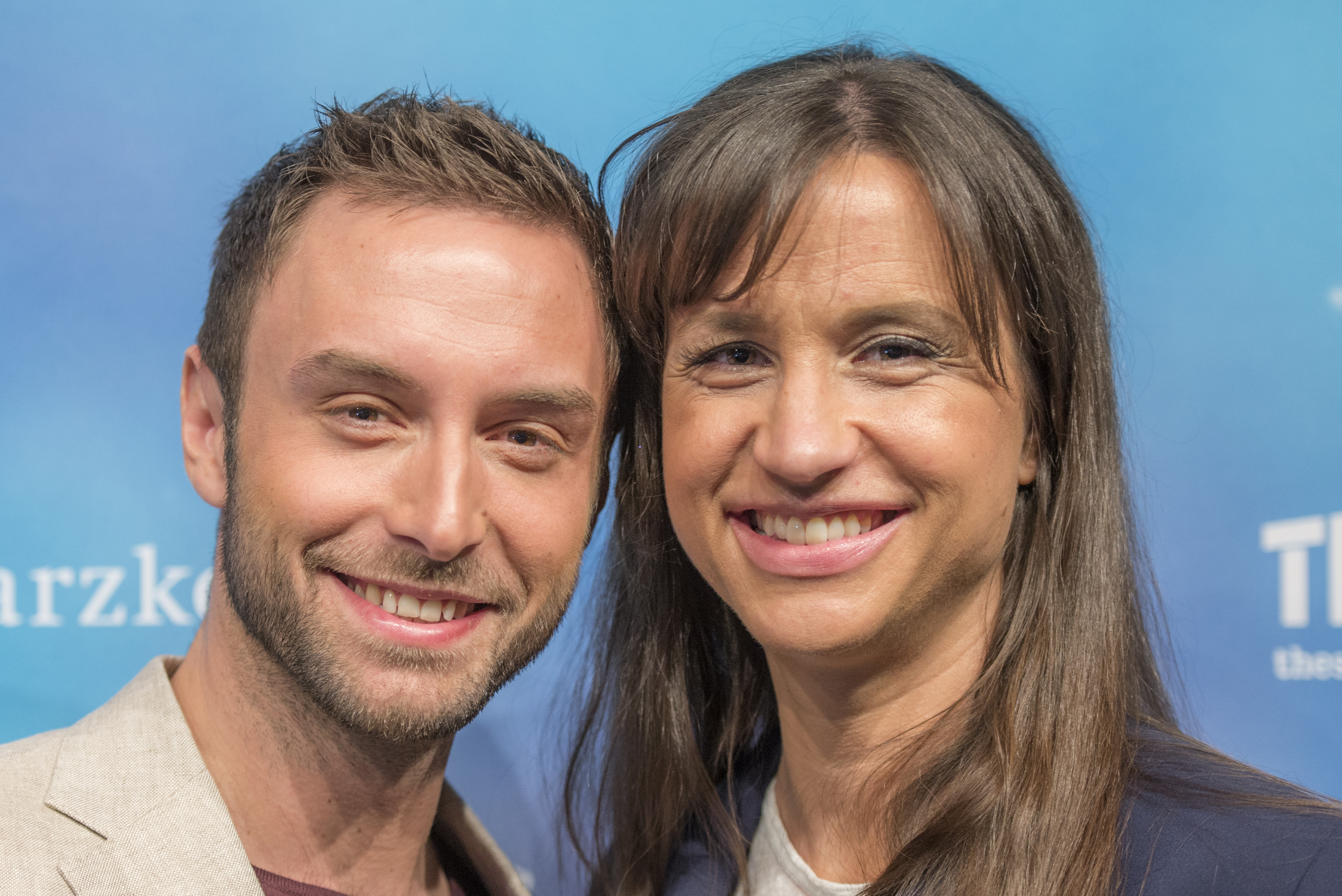
Måns Zelmerlöw and Petra Mede, hosts of the 2016 contest.

After his victory in the 2015 contest, Måns Zelmerlöw announced his interest in hosting the 2016 contest. His experience as a television presenter includes Melodifestivalen 2010 and SVT sing-along show Allsång på Skansen. Christer Björkman told Expressen on 25 May that Gina Dirawi, Petra Mede and Sanna Nielsen were also being considered as hosts, but it was reported on 1 June that SVT was considering Zelmerlöw and Dolph Lundgren as co-hosts. Expressen reported on 19 August that Mede and Zelmerlöw were SVT's first choice of hosts, while it was announced at a press conference on 14 December that they would indeed co-host.

The press conferences were presented by Jovan Radomir and Catarina Rolfsdotter-Jansson, who also provided commentary from the red carpet event in front of the Stockholm Palace, before the official welcome party at Stockholm City Hall on 8 May 2016.

=== Semi-final allocation draw ===
Results of the semi-final allocation draw Participating countries in the first semi-final Pre-qualified for the final but also voting in the first semi-final Participating countries in the second semi-final (Note: Romania, which had been originally allocated into semi-final 2, was disqualified in April 2016 due to repeated non-payment of debts to the EBU by its broadcaster TVR.) Pre-qualified for the final but also voting in the second semi-final

The draw to determine the allocation of the participating countries into their respective semi-finals took place at Stockholm City Hall on 25 January 2016, hosted by Alexandra Pascalidou and Jovan Radomir. The first part of the draw determined in which semi-final the "Big Five" and host country Sweden would have to vote. The second part of the draw decided in which half of the respective semi-finals each country would perform, with the exact running order determined by the producers of the show at a later date. The EBU originally announced that the running order would be revealed on 5 April, however for undisclosed reasons this was later put back to 8 April. Eighteen countries participated in the first semi-final, while nineteen countries were planned to participate in the second semi-final, but this was reduced to eighteen on 22 April due to the disqualification of Romania. From each semi-final, ten countries joined the "Big Five" and Sweden in the final, where a total of twenty-six countries participated.

The thirty-seven semi-finalists were allocated into six pots, which were published by the EBU on 21 January, based on historical voting patterns as calculated by the contest's official televoting partner Digame. Drawing from different pots helps in reducing the chance of so-called neighbour voting and increasing suspense in the semi-finals. Sweden and Germany were pre-allocated to vote and perform in the first and second semi-final respectively due to requests from their respective broadcasters, which were approved by the EBU.

Pot 1	Pot 2	Pot 3	Pot 4	Pot 5	Pot 6
Albania; Bosnia and Herzegovina; Croatia; Macedonia; Montenegro; Serbia; Slovenia	Denmark; Estonia; Finland; Iceland; Latvia; Norway	Armenia; Azerbaijan; Belarus; Georgia; Russia; Ukraine	Australia; Belgium; Bulgaria; Cyprus; Greece; Netherlands	Czech Republic; Ireland; Lithuania; Malta; Poland; San Marino	Austria; Hungary; Israel (Note: Israel, who had been allocated to pot six, were pre-allocated to compete in the second semi-final as the first semi-final coincided with Yom Hazikaron.); Moldova; ~~Romania~~; Switzerland

=== Opening and interval acts ===
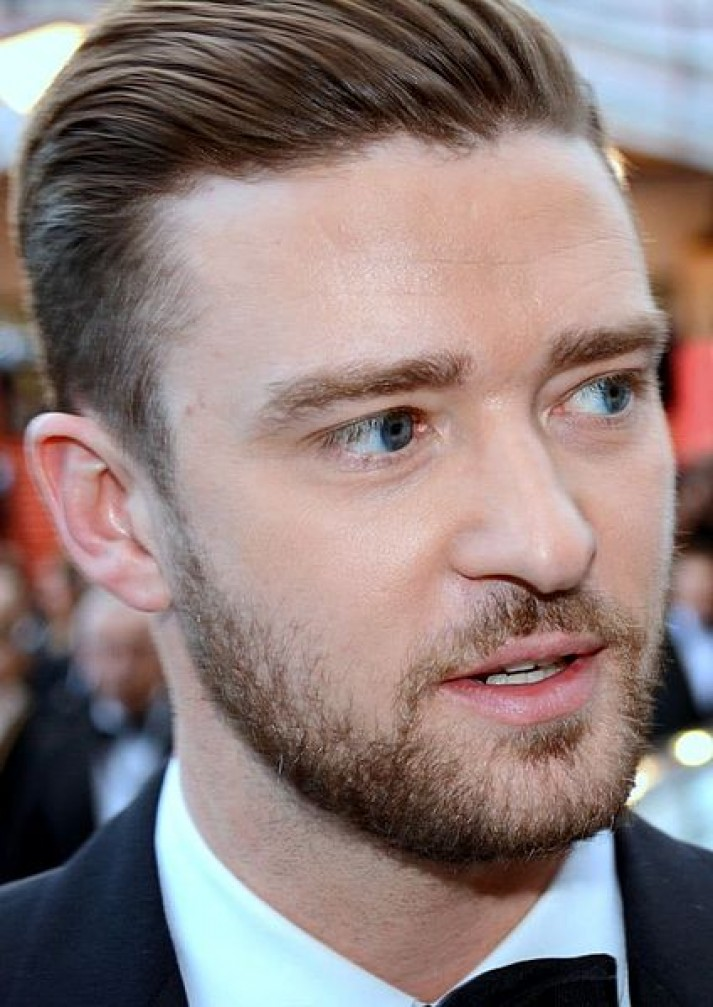
Justin Timberlake performed "Rock Your Body" and "Can't Stop the Feeling!" during the interval of the final.

The EBU announced on 1 May 2016 that the opening act of the first semi-final would be a performance of "Heroes" by Måns Zelmerlöw, while the opening act of the second semi-final would be a musical theatre comedy song entitled "That's Eurovision", composed by Matheson Bayley and written by Bayley, Edward af Sillén and Daniel Réhn, and performed by Zelmerlöw and Mede. The opening act of the final was a parade of flags similar to final opening ceremonies since 2013, themed as a tribute to Swedish fashion design and dance music with artists being welcomed on stage in a catwalk fashion show with flags being projected onto 26 dresses designed by Bea Szenfeld.

The interval acts of both semi-finals were sketches choreographed by Fredrik Rydman: "The Grey People" in the first semi-final and "Man vs Machine" in the second semi-final respectively. The EBU announced on 9 May that one of the interval acts of the final would be a world premiere live performance of "Can't Stop the Feeling!" and "Rock Your Body" by Justin Timberlake. He was the first "global megastar" in the contest's 61-year-history to perform during the interval. Other interval acts in the final included a sketch called "Love Love Peace Peace", a pastiche of past entries which featured appearances from Lordi and Alexander Rybak, winners of the contest in 2006 and 2009 respectively and performed by Zelmerlöw and Mede, a sketch starring Lynda Woodruff, played by Sarah Dawn Finer, and a performance of "Fire in the Rain" and "Heroes" by Zelmerlöw, from his albums Chameleon and Perfectly Damaged respectively.

During the live broadcast of the final on Logo TV in the United States, Timberlake's performance was replaced by a reprise of "The Grey People" from the first semi-final, while the official DVD release removed it entirely. In an interview with The Guardian, the contest's Executive Supervisor, Jon Ola Sand, revealed that this was due to rights restrictions.

== Contest overview ==
=== Semi-final 1 ===
The first semi-final took place on 10 May 2016 at 21:00 CEST. 18 countries participated in the first semi-final. All the countries competing in this semi-final were eligible to vote, plus France, Spain, and Sweden. The highlighted countries qualified for the final.

Qualifiers

Results of the first semi-final of the Eurovision Song Contest 2016
R/O	Country	Artist	Song	Points	Place
1	Finland	Sandhja	"Sing It Away"	51	15
2	Greece	Argo	"Utopian Land"	44	16
3	Moldova	Lidia Isac	"Falling Stars"	33	17
4	Hungary	Freddie	"Pioneer"	197	4
5	Croatia	Nina Kraljić	"Lighthouse"	133	10
6	Netherlands	Douwe Bob	"Slow Down"	197	5
7	Armenia	Iveta Mukuchyan	"LoveWave"	243	2
8	San Marino	Serhat	"I Didn't Know"	68	12
9	Russia	Sergey Lazarev	"You Are the Only One"	342	1
10	Czech Republic	Gabriela Gunčíková	"I Stand"	161	9
11	Cyprus	Minus One	"Alter Ego"	164	8
12	Austria	Zoë	"Loin d'ici"	170	7
13	Estonia	Jüri Pootsmann	"Play"	24	18
14	Azerbaijan	Samra	"Miracle"	185	6
15	Montenegro	Highway	"The Real Thing"	60	13
16	Iceland	Greta Salóme	"Hear Them Calling"	51	14
17	Bosnia and Herzegovina	Dalal and Deen feat. Ana Rucner and Jala	"Ljubav je"	104	11
18	Malta	Ira Losco	"Walk on Water"	209	3

=== Semi-final 2 ===
The second semi-final took place on 12 May 2016 at 21:00 CEST. 18 countries participated in the second semi-final. All the countries competing in this semi-final were eligible to vote, plus Germany, Italy, and the United Kingdom. Romania were originally planned to perform twelfth in this semi-final, but were disqualified due to repeated non-payment of debts to the EBU, resulting in countries originally planned to perform thirteenth or later to do so one place earlier. The highlighted countries qualified for the final.

Qualifiers

Results of the second semi-final of the Eurovision Song Contest 2016
R/O	Country	Artist	Song	Points	Place
1	Latvia	Justs	"Heartbeat"	132	8
2	Poland	Michał Szpak	"Color of Your Life"	151	6
3	Switzerland	Rykka	"The Last of Our Kind"	28	18
4	Israel	Hovi Star	"Made of Stars"	147	7
5	Belarus	Ivan	"Help You Fly"	84	12
6	Serbia	Sanja Vučić Zaa	"Goodbye (Shelter)"	105	10
7	Ireland	Nicky Byrne	"Sunlight"	46	15
8	Macedonia	Kaliopi	"Dona"	88	11
9	Lithuania	Donny Montell	"I've Been Waiting for This Night"	222	4
10	Australia	Dami Im	"Sound of Silence"	330	1
11	Slovenia	ManuElla	"Blue and Red"	57	14
12	Bulgaria	Poli Genova	"If Love Was a Crime"	220	5
13	Denmark	Lighthouse X	"Soldiers of Love"	34	17
14	Ukraine	Jamala	"1944"	287	2
15	Norway	Agnete	"Icebreaker"	63	13
16	Georgia	Nika Kocharov and Young Georgian Lolitaz	"Midnight Gold"	123	9
17	Albania	Eneda Tarifa	"Fairytale"	45	16
18	Belgium	Laura Tesoro	"What's the Pressure"	274	3

=== Final ===
The final took place on 14 May 2016 at 21:00 CEST and was won by Ukraine. The "Big Five", and the host country, Sweden, qualified directly for the final. From the two semi-finals on 10 and 12 May 2016, twenty countries qualified for the final.

26 countries participated in the final, with all 42 participating countries eligible to vote. The running order for the final was revealed after the second semi-final qualifiers' press conference on 13 May.

Ukraine won with 534 points. Australia (who won the jury vote) came second with 511 points, with Russia (who won the televote), Bulgaria, Sweden, France, Armenia, Poland, Lithuania and Belgium completing the top ten. Spain, Croatia, United Kingdom, Czech Republic and Germany occupied the bottom five positions.

Winner

Results of the final of the Eurovision Song Contest 2016
R/O	Country	Artist	Song	Points	Place
1	Belgium	Laura Tesoro	"What's the Pressure"	181	10
2	Czech Republic	Gabriela Gunčíková	"I Stand"	41	25
3	Netherlands	Douwe Bob	"Slow Down"	153	11
4	Azerbaijan	Samra	"Miracle"	117	17
5	Hungary	Freddie	"Pioneer"	108	19
6	Italy	Francesca Michielin	"No Degree of Separation"	124	16
7	Israel	Hovi Star	"Made of Stars"	135	14
8	Bulgaria	Poli Genova	"If Love Was a Crime"	307	4
9	Sweden	Frans	"If I Were Sorry"	261	5
10	Germany	Jamie-Lee	"Ghost"	11	26
11	France	Amir	"J'ai cherché"	257	6
12	Poland	Michał Szpak	"Color of Your Life"	229	8
13	Australia	Dami Im	"Sound of Silence"	511	2
14	Cyprus	Minus One	"Alter Ego"	96	21
15	Serbia	Sanja Vučić Zaa	"Goodbye (Shelter)"	115	18
16	Lithuania	Donny Montell	"I've Been Waiting for This Night"	200	9
17	Croatia	Nina Kraljić	"Lighthouse"	73	23
18	Russia	Sergey Lazarev	"You Are the Only One"	491	3
19	Spain	Barei	"Say Yay!"	77	22
20	Latvia	Justs	"Heartbeat"	132	15
21	Ukraine	Jamala	"1944"	534	1
22	Malta	Ira Losco	"Walk on Water"	153	12
23	Georgia	Nika Kocharov and Young Georgian Lolitaz	"Midnight Gold"	104	20
24	Austria	Zoë	"Loin d'ici"	151	13
25	United Kingdom	Joe and Jake	"You're Not Alone"	62	24
26	Armenia	Iveta Mukuchyan	"LoveWave"	249	7

==== Spokespersons ====
The spokespersons announced the 12-point score from their respective country's national jury in the following order:

1. Austria – Kati Bellowitsch
2. Iceland – Unnsteinn Manúel Stefánsson
3. Azerbaijan – Tural Asadov
4. San Marino – Irol MC
5. Czech Republic – Daniela Písařovicová
6. Ireland – Sinéad Kennedy
7. Georgia – Nina Sublatti
8. Bosnia and Herzegovina – Ivana Crnogorac
9. Malta – Ben Camille
10. Spain – Jota Abril
11. Finland – Jussi-Pekka Rantanen
12. Switzerland – Sebalter
13. Denmark – Ulla Essendrop
14. France – Élodie Gossuin
15. Moldova – Olivia Furtună
16. Armenia – Arman Margaryan
17. Cyprus – Loukas Hamatsos
18. Bulgaria – Anna Angelova
19. Netherlands – Trijntje Oosterhuis
20. Latvia – Toms Grēviņš
21. Israel – Ofer Nachshon
22. Belarus – Uzari
23. Germany – Barbara Schöneberger
24. Russia – Nyusha
25. Norway – Elisabeth Andreassen
26. Australia – Lee Lin Chin
27. Belgium – Umesh Vangaver
28. United Kingdom – Richard Osman
29. Croatia – Nevena Rendeli
30. Greece – Constantinos Christoforou
31. Lithuania – Ugnė Galadauskaitė
32. Serbia – Dragana Kosjerina
33. Macedonia – Dijana Gogova
34. Albania – Andri Xhahu
35. Estonia – Daniel Levi Viinalass
36. Ukraine – Verka Serduchka
37. Italy – Claudia Andreatti
38. Poland – Anna Popek
39. Slovenia – Marjetka Vovk
40. Hungary – Csilla Tatár
41. Montenegro – Danijel Alibabić
42. Sweden – Gina Dirawi

== Detailed voting results ==
=== Semi-final 1 ===
Qualifiers

Split results of semi-final 1
Place	Combined		Jury		Televoting	
Place	Country	Points	Country	Points	Country	Points
1	Russia	342	Malta	155	Russia	194
2	Armenia	243	Russia	148	Austria	133
3	Malta	209	Armenia	127	Hungary	119
4	Hungary	197 (Note: Despite finishing with the same number of points as the Netherlands, Hungary is deemed to have finished in fourth place due to receiving a greater number of points in the televote.)	Czech Republic	120	Armenia	116
5	Netherlands	197	Netherlands	102	Netherlands	95
6	Azerbaijan	185	Azerbaijan	92	Cyprus	93
7	Austria	170	Croatia	80	Azerbaijan	93
8	Cyprus	164	Hungary	78	Bosnia and Herzegovina	78
9	Czech Republic	161	Cyprus	71	Malta	54
10	Croatia	133	Montenegro	46	Croatia	53
11	Bosnia and Herzegovina	104	Austria	37	San Marino	49
12	San Marino	68	Finland	35	Czech Republic	41
13	Montenegro	60	Iceland	27	Iceland	24
14	Iceland	51 (Note: Despite finishing with the same number of points as Finland, Iceland is deemed to have finished in fourteenth place due to receiving a greater number of points in the televote.)	Bosnia and Herzegovina	26	Greece	22
15	Finland	51	Moldova	24	Finland	16
16	Greece	44	Greece	22	Estonia	15
17	Moldova	33	San Marino	19	Montenegro	14
18	Estonia	24	Estonia	9	Moldova	9

Detailed jury voting results of semi-final 1
Voting procedure used: 100% televoting; 100% jury vote		Total score	Jury score	Televoting score	Jury vote																				
Voting procedure used: 100% televoting; 100% jury vote		Total score	Jury score	Televoting score	Finland	Greece	Moldova	Hungary	Croatia	Netherlands	Armenia	San Marino	Russia	Czech Republic	Cyprus	Austria	Estonia	Azerbaijan	Montenegro	Iceland	Bosnia and Herzegovina	Malta	France	Spain	Sweden
Contestants	Finland	51	35	16				4		2	8			7		2						5		3	4
Contestants	Greece	44	22	22							3		7		3			6	3						
Contestants	Moldova	33	24	9		3					6		6					5				4			
Contestants	**Hungary**	197	78	119		7	3		8	3			4	**12**	6		5	8	1	2	4		5	10	
Contestants	**Croatia**	133	80	53	5		5	3		**12**	2	1	1	6	7	7	3		7	7	5		6		3
Contestants	**Netherlands**	197	102	95	**12**	1	4	6	2		4	**12**		10		6	**12**		2	**12**	1		8	4	6
Contestants	**Armenia**	243	127	116	7	10	10	5	5	5			**12**		10	5	2		**12**	5	7	**12**	3	**12**	5
Contestants	San Marino	68	19	49														3			10	6			
Contestants	**Russia**	342	148	194	6	**12**	**12**	10	6	1	7	3			**12**	8	1	**12**	8	10	8	10	2	8	**12**
Contestants	**Czech Republic**	161	120	41	10		8	8	**12**	4	5	4	5		5	10	6	2	4	8	**12**	3	1	6	7
Contestants	**Cyprus**	164	71	93		8	7	2	10	10		8		1			10			1		8	4	1	1
Contestants	**Austria**	170	37	133	3	2				6				5	2					4		1	**12**		2
Contestants	Estonia	24	9	15	1		2						2			1		1				2			
Contestants	**Azerbaijan**	185	92	93	2	5		7	3	7		6	10	3	4	4	7		5	3	6		7	5	8
Contestants	Montenegro	60	46	14		6					10	10	3					7			3	7			
Contestants	Iceland	51	27	24	4			1	1			7		4	1	3	4							2	
Contestants	Bosnia and Herzegovina	104	26	78			1		4		1	2		2				10	6						
Contestants	**Malta**	209	155	54	8	4	6	**12**	7	8	**12**	5	8	8	8	**12**	8	4	10	6	2		10	7	10

Detailed televoting results of semi-final 1
Voting procedure used: 100% televoting; 100% jury vote		Total score	Jury score	Televoting score	Televote																				
Voting procedure used: 100% televoting; 100% jury vote		Total score	Jury score	Televoting score	Finland	Greece	Moldova	Hungary	Croatia	Netherlands	Armenia	San Marino	Russia	Czech Republic	Cyprus	Austria	Estonia	Azerbaijan	Montenegro	Iceland	Bosnia and Herzegovina	Malta	France	Spain	Sweden
Contestants	Finland	51	35	16				1									7			2					6
Contestants	Greece	44	22	22							7		3		**12**										
Contestants	Moldova	33	24	9									5		2								2		
Contestants	**Hungary**	197	78	119	4	7	6		8	6	6	7	6	6	6	8	5	7	6	6	1	8	7	5	4
Contestants	**Croatia**	133	80	53	2	4	2			5	3		4	2	1	6			8		**12**		1	2	1
Contestants	**Netherlands**	197	102	95	6	2		6	5		4	6		3	4	10	8	4		10		7	4	6	10
Contestants	**Armenia**	243	127	116	1	8	8	2	3	**12**		8	**12**	**12**	7	4	1		3	3	3	4	**12**	10	3
Contestants	San Marino	68	19	49	3	6	4	5		4						5	4	10	2	1		5			
Contestants	**Russia**	342	148	194	8	10	10	10	10	8	**12**	**12**		8	10	7	**12**	**12**	10	**12**	7	**12**	8	8	8
Contestants	**Czech Republic**	161	120	41		3	3	3	4	2	2	2	1			1		3	1		4	2	3	7	
Contestants	**Cyprus**	164	71	93	7	**12**		7	2	3	8	5	8	4		2	6	1	5	5	2	6	5	3	2
Contestants	**Austria**	170	37	133	10	5	7	8	7	10	5	3	10	5	3		10	6		8	6	1	10	**12**	7
Contestants	Estonia	24	9	15	**12**		1											2							
Contestants	**Azerbaijan**	185	92	93			**12**	**12**				10	7	10	8				7	7	10	10			
Contestants	Montenegro	60	46	14					6												8				
Contestants	Iceland	51	27	24	5							1				3	3					3		4	5
Contestants	Bosnia and Herzegovina	104	26	78					**12**	7	1	4		7		**12**		5	**12**				6		**12**
Contestants	**Malta**	209	155	54		1	5	4	1	1	10		2	1	5		2	8	4	4	5			1	

==== 12 points ====
Below is a summary of the maximum 12 points awarded by each country's professional jury and televote in the first semi-final. Countries in bold gave the maximum 24 points (12 points apiece from professional jury and televoting) to the specified entrant.

12 points awarded by juries
N.	Contestant	Nation(s) giving 12 points
5	Russia	**Azerbaijan**, Cyprus, Greece, Moldova, Sweden
4	Armenia	Malta, Montenegro, **Russia**, Spain
4	Netherlands	Estonia, Finland, Iceland, San Marino
3	Malta	Armenia, Austria, Hungary
2	Czech Republic	Bosnia and Herzegovina, Croatia
1	Austria	France
1	Croatia	Netherlands
1	Hungary	Czech Republic

12 points awarded by televoting
N.	Contestant	Nation(s) giving 12 points
6	Russia	Armenia, **Azerbaijan**, Estonia, Iceland, Malta, San Marino
4	Armenia	Czech Republic, France, Netherlands, **Russia**
4	Bosnia and Herzegovina	Austria, Croatia, Montenegro, Sweden
2	Azerbaijan	Hungary, Moldova
1	Austria	Spain
1	Croatia	Bosnia and Herzegovina
1	Cyprus	Greece
1	Estonia	Finland
1	Greece	Cyprus

=== Semi-final 2 ===
Qualifiers

Split results of semi-final 2
Place	Combined		Jury		Televoting	
Place	Country	Points	Country	Points	Country	Points
1	Australia	330	Australia	188	Ukraine	152
2	Ukraine	287	Belgium	139	Australia	142
3	Belgium	274	Ukraine	135	Belgium	135
4	Lithuania	222	Israel	127	Poland	131
5	Bulgaria	220	Lithuania	104	Bulgaria	122
6	Poland	151	Bulgaria	98	Lithuania	118
7	Israel	147	Georgia	84	Latvia	68
8	Latvia	132	Latvia	64	Macedonia	54
9	Georgia	123	Serbia	55	Belarus	52
10	Serbia	105	Slovenia	49	Serbia	50
11	Macedonia	88	Macedonia	34	Georgia	39
12	Belarus	84	Belarus	32	Albania	35
13	Norway	63	Norway	29	Norway	34
14	Slovenia	57	Switzerland	25	Ireland	31
15	Ireland	46	Poland	20	Denmark	24
16	Albania	45	Ireland	15	Israel	20
17	Denmark	34	Denmark	10	Slovenia	8
18	Switzerland	28	Albania	10	Switzerland	3

Detailed jury voting results of semi-final 2
Voting procedure used: 100% televoting; 100% jury vote		Total score	Jury score	Televoting score	Jury vote																				
Voting procedure used: 100% televoting; 100% jury vote		Total score	Jury score	Televoting score	Latvia	Poland	Switzerland	Israel	Belarus	Serbia	Ireland	Macedonia	Lithuania	Australia	Slovenia	Bulgaria	Denmark	Ukraine	Norway	Georgia	Albania	Belgium	Germany	Italy	United Kingdom
Contestants	**Latvia**	132	64	68		6	6	7			4	2	7		10		3	6	2	5	1		5		
Contestants	**Poland**	151	20	131						1			3		3			1	4	3	2			3	
Contestants	Switzerland	28	25	3				1			5			1	7		2			7		1	1		
Contestants	**Israel**	147	127	20	2	8	10		1	7	7	6	6	10	4	5	5	7	5	6	4	10	**12**	8	4
Contestants	Belarus	84	32	52	1	4	1				2			6	2	6		5					2		3
Contestants	**Serbia**	105	55	50	5	1	3		5			**12**		3		8		3			8	2		5	
Contestants	Ireland	46	15	31				2									4	2	3					2	2
Contestants	Macedonia	88	34	54				8		**12**				2							**12**				
Contestants	**Lithuania**	222	104	118	**12**	3	8	4	10	5	3	5		7	1	3	10	8	8	2		3	3	1	8
Contestants	**Australia**	330	188	142	8	10	**12**	**12**	8	4	6	4	**12**		5	**12**	**12**	**12**	**12**	8	10	**12**	7	**12**	10
Contestants	Slovenia	57	49	8	3					6	8	7	1	4		1					6	7		6	
Contestants	**Bulgaria**	220	98	122	7	5	4	3	4	2	10	8	2	8	6		7		10		7	6	4		5
Contestants	Denmark	34	10	24					3											4	3				
Contestants	**Ukraine**	287	135	152	10	**12**	5	10	7	10		10	8		8	4	1		6	**12**	5	5	6	10	6
Contestants	Norway	63	29	34			2		6				4	5			6			1		4			1
Contestants	**Georgia**	123	84	39	6	7		5	2	3	1	1	10			7		4	1			8	10	7	**12**
Contestants	Albania	45	10	35						8						2									
Contestants	**Belgium**	274	139	135	4	2	7	6	**12**		**12**	3	5	**12**	**12**	10	8	10	7	10			8	4	7

Detailed televoting results of semi-final 2
Voting procedure used: 100% televoting; 100% jury vote		Total score	Jury score	Televoting score	Televote																				
Voting procedure used: 100% televoting; 100% jury vote		Total score	Jury score	Televoting score	Latvia	Poland	Switzerland	Israel	Belarus	Serbia	Ireland	Macedonia	Lithuania	Australia	Slovenia	Bulgaria	Denmark	Ukraine	Norway	Georgia	Albania	Belgium	Germany	Italy	United Kingdom
Contestants	**Latvia**	132	64	68		5			5		7	7	**12**	5			2	3	3	8		3	3		5
Contestants	**Poland**	151	20	131	4		7	6	6	1	10	1	7		4	6	6	**12**	10	7		**12**	**12**	10	10
Contestants	Switzerland	28	25	3																	3				
Contestants	**Israel**	147	127	20					1		2			6		2		2	1	1		1	2		2
Contestants	Belarus	84	32	52	7	8		3		5	1		6			4	1	10		6				1	
Contestants	**Serbia**	105	55	50			**12**					10		2	**12**	5				2			1	6	
Contestants	Ireland	46	15	31	1	2	2	1					1	7			4		2			4			7
Contestants	Macedonia	88	34	54			4	2		**12**				4	10	8					**12**			2	
Contestants	**Lithuania**	222	104	118	10	3		5	10		**12**			8		3	7	6	**12**	10	4	8	4	4	**12**
Contestants	**Australia**	330	188	142	8	10	6	**12**	7	7	8	4	5		6	7	8	7	8	4	6	10	10	3	6
Contestants	Slovenia	57	49	8						4		3									1				
Contestants	**Bulgaria**	220	98	122	3	4	3	10	8	8	5	8	3	10	5		3	5	6	5	7	7	7	7	8
Contestants	Denmark	34	10	24	2	1	1	4			3			1					5		2	5			
Contestants	**Ukraine**	287	135	152	**12**	**12**	5	7	**12**	6	4	6	10	3	8	**12**	5		4	**12**	5	6	8	**12**	3
Contestants	Norway	63	29	34					3	3		2	2		2	1	10	1			10				
Contestants	**Georgia**	123	84	39	5	7			2	2			8		1			8					5		1
Contestants	Albania	45	10	35			10					**12**			3							2		8	
Contestants	**Belgium**	274	139	135	6	6	8	8	4	10	6	5	4	**12**	7	10	**12**	4	7	3	8		6	5	4

==== 12 points ====
Below is a summary of the maximum 12 points awarded by each country's professional jury and televote in the second semi-final. Countries in bold gave the maximum 24 points (12 points apiece from professional jury and televoting) to the specified entrant.

12 points awarded by juries
N.	Contestant	Nation(s) giving 12 points
9	Australia	Belgium, Bulgaria, Denmark, **Israel**, Italy, Lithuania, Norway, Switzerland, Ukraine
4	Belgium	**Australia**, Belarus, Ireland, Slovenia
2	Macedonia	**Albania**, **Serbia**
2	Ukraine	**Georgia**, **Poland**
1	Georgia	United Kingdom
1	Israel	Germany
1	Lithuania	Latvia
1	Serbia	Macedonia

12 points awarded by televoting
N.	Contestant	Nation(s) giving 12 points
6	Ukraine	Belarus, Bulgaria, **Georgia**, Italy, Latvia, **Poland**
3	Poland	Belgium, Germany, Ukraine
3	Lithuania	Ireland, Norway, United Kingdom
2	Belgium	**Australia**, Denmark
2	Macedonia	**Albania**, **Serbia**
2	Serbia	Slovenia, Switzerland
1	Albania	Macedonia
1	Australia	**Israel**
1	Latvia	Lithuania

=== Final ===
Winner

Split results of the final
Place	Combined		Jury		Televoting	
Place	Country	Points	Country	Points	Country	Points
1	Ukraine	534	Australia	320	Russia	361
2	Australia	511	Ukraine	211	Ukraine	323
3	Russia	491	France	148	Poland	222
4	Bulgaria	307	Malta	137	Australia	191
5	Sweden	261	Russia	130	Bulgaria	180
6	France	257	Belgium	130	Sweden	139
7	Armenia	249	Bulgaria	127	Armenia	134
8	Poland	229	Israel	124	Austria	120
9	Lithuania	200	Sweden	122	France	109
10	Belgium	181	Armenia	115	Lithuania	96
11	Netherlands	153 (Note: Despite finishing with the same number of points as Malta, the Netherlands is deemed to have finished in eleventh place due to receiving a greater number of points in the televote.)	Netherlands	114	Serbia	80
12	Malta	153	Lithuania	104	Azerbaijan	73
13	Austria	151	Italy	90	Latvia	63
14	Israel	135	Georgia	80	Hungary	56
15	Latvia	132	Latvia	69	Cyprus	53
16	Italy	124	Spain	67	Belgium	51
17	Azerbaijan	117	United Kingdom	54	Netherlands	39
18	Serbia	115	Hungary	52	Italy	34
19	Hungary	108	Azerbaijan	44	Croatia	33
20	Georgia	104	Cyprus	43	Georgia	24
21	Cyprus	96	Czech Republic	41	Malta	16
22	Spain	77	Croatia	40	Israel	11
23	Croatia	73	Serbia	35	Spain	10
24	United Kingdom	62	Austria	31	Germany	10
25	Czech Republic	41	Poland	7	United Kingdom	8
26	Germany	11	Germany	1	Czech Republic	0

Detailed jury voting results of the final
Voting procedure used: 100% televoting; 100% jury vote		Total score	Jury score	Televoting score	Jury vote																																									
Voting procedure used: 100% televoting; 100% jury vote		Total score	Jury score	Televoting score	Austria	Iceland	Azerbaijan	San Marino	Czech Republic	Ireland	Georgia	Bosnia and Herzegovina	Malta	Spain	Finland	Switzerland	Denmark	France	Moldova	Armenia	Cyprus	Bulgaria	Netherlands	Latvia	Israel	Belarus	Germany	Russia	Norway	Australia	Belgium	United Kingdom	Croatia	Greece	Lithuania	Serbia	Macedonia	Albania	Estonia	Ukraine	Italy	Poland	Slovenia	Hungary	Montenegro	Sweden
Contestants	Belgium	181	130	51	5	3			2	**12**	10					10	8			4		10	4		6	4	5		5	**12**					5		4			10			8		3	
Contestants	Czech Republic	41	41	0	4	5				2		6			3					1											1		10									4		2		3
Contestants	Netherlands	153	114	39		**12**		4	7	8				3	10	5	7	7				2		3			4		6	3	4					5	2		6		4		1	6		5
Contestants	Azerbaijan	117	44	73								1		2							2		1			2		10						1			1			7				7		10
Contestants	Hungary	108	52	56			4	2	10					10							4							1					5	3				1		2			3		7	
Contestants	Italy	124	90	34				10		6			8	5	2	2		**12**			3		6				3		**12**		10		3					8								
Contestants	Israel	135	124	11			3			4	3		1	1	7	8	2				5		7	2			**12**		3	10	2	3	7		6	7	5	3		6	8	7	2			
Contestants	Bulgaria	307	127	180			8			10		3	10			1	6	10		7				1	7	1			8	8	6	5			2	4	10	4		1		3	10		2	
Contestants	Sweden	261	122	139	8	6			**12**	5	6				**12**		4	5	6				10	8		8	10												**12**	4	2			4		
Contestants	Germany	11	1	10							1																																			
Contestants	France	257	148	109	7	2			5	3	4	7	6	7	1					**12**	7		5		8			7		6	8	6	8	6	1			10	1		7	1			5	8
Contestants	Poland	229	7	222			2																						1						3										1	
Contestants	Australia	511	320	191	**12**	10	7				8	10	3	8	8	**12**	10	6	10	5	10	8	**12**	5	10	6	6	2	10		**12**	8	**12**	7	**12**	6	8	**12**	10	5	6	10	6	**12**	4	**12**
Contestants	Cyprus	96	43	53				5					5						2	6								4				7	1	8					4		1					
Contestants	Serbia	115	35	80								8										5										2	2				7						5		6	
Contestants	Lithuania	200	104	96	1		5		3		5				6	7	5		4			1		10	1	10	1		2	7		4				8			5	**12**		2		3		2
Contestants	Croatia	73	40	33	6	7			8		2	4							1		1				3					1		1					6									
Contestants	Russia	491	130	361	3	8	**12**	7				5	4	4				1	7	2	**12**	6		7		**12**							6	**12**		1		7							8	6
Contestants	Spain	77	67	10			1						2				1	3	8	3		4			4				7	5								6			**12**	5		5		1
Contestants	Latvia	132	69	63					1	1	7					3									5		2	3							7		3		8	8		6	7	8		
Contestants	**Ukraine**	**534**	211	323			10	**12**			**12**	**12**				6	**12**		**12**				3	**12**	**12**	7	7		4	2	3	10		2	8	**12**	**12**		7		10	**12**	**12**			
Contestants	Malta	153	137	16	10	4	6	3	6					6	5			4	3	8	6	7		4		5		8						4		10		2	2		5			10	**12**	7
Contestants	Georgia	104	80	24				6												10		3					8	5			7	**12**		5	10					3	3	8				
Contestants	Austria	151	31	120		1		1							4	4		8					8								5															
Contestants	United Kingdom	62	54	8				8	4	7			**12**				3											6		4						2		5	3							
Contestants	Armenia	249	115	134	2							2	7	**12**				2	5		8	**12**	2	6	2	3		**12**					4	10	4	3							4	1	10	4

Detailed televoting results of the final
Voting procedure used: 100% televoting; 100% jury vote		Total score	Jury score	Televoting score	Televote																																									
Voting procedure used: 100% televoting; 100% jury vote		Total score	Jury score	Televoting score	Austria	Iceland	Azerbaijan	San Marino	Czech Republic	Ireland	Georgia	Bosnia and Herzegovina	Malta	Spain	Finland	Switzerland	Denmark	France	Moldova	Armenia	Cyprus	Bulgaria	Netherlands	Latvia	Israel	Belarus	Germany	Russia	Norway	Australia	Belgium	United Kingdom	Croatia	Greece	Lithuania	Serbia	Macedonia	Albania	Estonia	Ukraine	Italy	Poland	Slovenia	Hungary	Montenegro	Sweden
Contestants	Belgium	181	130	51		3											8	4					**12**		1				2	**12**						5	4									
Contestants	Czech Republic	41	41	0																																										
Contestants	Netherlands	153	114	39	6	6							3				7										3				10													2		2
Contestants	Azerbaijan	117	44	73		1			6		7	8	6						8			1		3	2	8		6												10					7	
Contestants	Hungary	108	52	56			7	1	3		2	1	5							3	4					3							3	2	2	10		1				6			3	
Contestants	Italy	124	90	34									7	3		7											1										1	10					1		4	
Contestants	Israel	135	124	11			6											3				2																								
Contestants	Bulgaria	307	127	180	5		8	3	5	5	3	2	8	**12**	4			5	2		**12**		1	1	7	4	4		5	10	5	8	1	7		8	10	8		2	7	3	2	4	5	4
Contestants	Sweden	261	122	139	7	**12**		4	2	2				1	10		**12**	2		2	1	3	2	7		2	8	2	7		1	1	7		7	1		3	10	1		10	5	7		
Contestants	Germany	11	1	10	2											8																														
Contestants	France	257	148	109	1	5	4					4	2	10	3	3	2		6	7	6		4		**12**			3	1	7	8		2	4	3				2		5			1	1	3
Contestants	Poland	229	7	222	**12**	10	3	7	7	10	4			5	5	5	5	7		1	2	6	10	5	4	6	10	5	10		**12**	10	4	3	6		2	5	1	8	10		4	8		10
Contestants	Australia	511	320	191	3	8	2	5	1	6	1	3	**12**	4	7	1	10		5		5	5	5	6	5	1	5	4	8		4	6	5	5	5	6	3	**12**	4	4		7	3	3		**12**
Contestants	Cyprus	96	43	53											1					6		7						7				2		**12**		3			3		6	1		5		
Contestants	Serbia	115	35	80	4							**12**				**12**																	**12**				**12**				4		**12**		**12**	
Contestants	Lithuania	200	104	96		4		8		**12**	5						6		3		3			8					**12**	1		**12**						4	5	3	2				2	6
Contestants	Croatia	73	40	33								10																								4	5						8		6	
Contestants	Russia	491	130	361	8	7	**12**	10	10	8	8	6	10	8	8	6	4	6	**12**	**12**	10	**12**	3	**12**	10	**12**	**12**		6	5	6	7	8	10	8	**12**	8	7	**12**	**12**	8	8	10	10	10	8
Contestants	Spain	77	67	10												2		1												2		4														1
Contestants	Latvia	132	69	63				6		7	6				2				1							5		1	3			3			**12**				7	5		5				
Contestants	**Ukraine**	**534**	211	323	10		10	**12**	**12**	4	10	7	4	7	**12**	4	3	10	10	10	7	10	7	10	8	10	6	10	4	8	2	5	10	6	10	7	6	6	8		**12**	**12**	7	**12**	8	7
Contestants	Malta	153	137	16			5													5										6																
Contestants	Georgia	104	80	24			1													8				2											4					6	3					
Contestants	Austria	151	31	120		2			4	1		5		2	6	10	1	8	4	4		4	6	4	3		7	8		3	3		6	1	1				6			4	6	6		5
Contestants	United Kingdom	62	54	8						3			1																	4																
Contestants	Armenia	249	115	134				2	8		**12**			6				**12**	7		8	8	8		6	7	2	**12**			7			8		2	7	2		7	1	2				

==== 12 points ====
Below is a summary of the maximum 12 points awarded by each country's professional jury and televote in the final. Countries in bold gave the maximum 24 points (12 points apiece from professional jury and televoting) to the specified entrant.

12 points awarded by juries
N.	Contestant	Nation(s) giving 12 points
11	Ukraine	Bosnia and Herzegovina, Denmark, Georgia, Israel, Latvia, Macedonia, Moldova, **Poland**, **San Marino**, Serbia, Slovenia
9	Australia	**Albania**, Austria, Belgium, Croatia, Hungary, Lithuania, Netherlands, **Sweden**, Switzerland
4	Russia	**Azerbaijan**, **Belarus**, Cyprus, Greece
3	Armenia	Bulgaria, **Russia**, Spain
3	Sweden	Czech Republic, Estonia, Finland
2	Belgium	**Australia**, Ireland
2	Italy	France, Norway
1	France	Armenia
1	Georgia	United Kingdom
1	Israel	Germany
1	Lithuania	Ukraine
1	Malta	Montenegro
1	Netherlands	Iceland
1	Spain	Italy
1	United Kingdom	Malta

12 points awarded by televoting
N.	Contestant	Nation(s) giving 12 points
10	Russia	Armenia, **Azerbaijan**, **Belarus**, Bulgaria, Estonia, Germany, Latvia, Moldova, Serbia, Ukraine
6	Serbia	Bosnia and Herzegovina, Croatia, Macedonia, Montenegro, Slovenia, Switzerland
6	Ukraine	Czech Republic, Finland, Hungary, Italy, **Poland**, **San Marino**
3	Armenia	France, Georgia, **Russia**
3	Australia	**Albania**, Malta, **Sweden**
3	Lithuania	Ireland, Norway, United Kingdom
2	Belgium	**Australia**, Netherlands
2	Bulgaria	Cyprus, Spain
2	Poland	Austria, Belgium
2	Sweden	Denmark, Iceland
1	Cyprus	Greece
1	France	Israel
1	Latvia	Lithuania

== Broadcasts ==
Most countries sent commentators to Stockholm or commentated from their own country, in order to add insight to the participants and, if necessary, the provision of voting information.

It was reported by the EBU that the contest was viewed by a worldwide television audience of over 200 million viewers, beating the 2015 record which was viewed by 197 million.

Broadcasters and commentators in participating countries
Country	Broadcaster	Channel(s)	Show(s)	Commentator(s)	Ref(s)
Albania	RTSH	TVSH, RTSH HD	All shows	Andri Xhahu	
Albania	RTSH	RTSH Muzikë, Radio Tirana	All shows	Andri Xhahu	
Armenia	AMPTV	Armenia 1, Public Radio of Armenia	All shows	Avet Barseghyan	
Australia	SBS	SBS, SBS Radio 4	All shows	Julia Zemiro and Sam Pang	
Austria	ORF	ORF eins	All shows	Andi Knoll	
Azerbaijan	İTV		All shows	Azer Suleymanli	
Belarus	BTRC	Belarus-1, Belarus 24	All shows	Evgeny Perlin	
Belgium	VRT	één	All shows	Peter Van de Veire	
Belgium	RTBF	La Une	All shows	Jean-Louis Lahaye and Maureen Louys	
Bosnia and Herzegovina	BHRT	BHT 1, BHT HD, BH Radio 1	All shows	Dejan Kukrić	
Bulgaria	BNT	BNT 1, BNT HD	All shows	Elena Rosberg and Georgi Kushvaliev	
Croatia	HRT	HRT 1	All shows	Duško Ćurlić	
Croatia	HRT	HR 2	All shows	Zlatko Turkalj	
Cyprus	CyBC	RIK 1, RIK Sat, RIK HD, RIK Triton	All shows	Melina Karageorgiou	
Czech Republic	ČT	ČT2	Semi-finals	Libor Bouček	
Czech Republic	ČT	ČT1	Final	Libor Bouček	
Denmark	DR	DR1	All shows	Ole Tøpholm	
Estonia	ERR	ETV	All shows	Marko Reikop	
Estonia	ERR	ETV+	All shows	Aleksandr Hobotov	
Estonia	ERR	Raadio 2	SF1/Final	Mart Juur and Andrus Kivirähk	
Finland	Yle	Yle TV2, TV Finland	All shows	Finnish: Mikko Silvennoinen; Swedish: Eva Frantz and Johan Lindroos	
Finland	Yle	Yle Radio Vega	All shows	Eva Frantz and Johan Lindroos	
France	France Télévisions	France 4	Semi-finals	Marianne James and Jarry	
France	France Télévisions	France 2	Final	Marianne James and Stéphane Bern	
Georgia	GPB	1TV	All shows	Tuta Chkheidze and Nika Katsia	
Germany	ARD	Einsfestival, Phoenix	Semi-finals	Peter Urban	
Germany	ARD	Das Erste	Final	Peter Urban	
Greece	ERT	ERT1, ERT HD, ERT World	All shows	Maria Kozakou and Giorgos Kapoutzidis	
Greece	ERT	Deftero Programma, Voice of Greece	All shows	Maria Kozakou and Giorgos Kapoutzidis	
Hungary	MTVA	Duna	All shows	Gábor Gundel Takács	
Iceland	RÚV	RÚV, Rás 2	All shows	Gísli Marteinn Baldursson	
Ireland	RTÉ	RTÉ2	Semi-finals	Marty Whelan	
Ireland	RTÉ	RTÉ One	Final	Marty Whelan	
Ireland	RTÉ	RTÉ Radio 1	SF2/Final	Neil Doherty and Zbyszek Zalinski	
Israel	IBA	Channel 1	All shows (Note: The first semi-final was broadcast on Channel 1 delayed; the second semi-final and the final were broadcast live.)	No commentary; Hebrew subtitles	
Israel	IBA	Channel 33	SF2/Final	No commentary; Arabic subtitles	
Israel	IBA	IBA 88FM	SF2/Final	Kobi Menora, Or Vaxman and Nancy Brandes	
Italy	RAI	Rai 4	Semi-finals	Marco Ardemagni and Filippo Solibello	
Italy	RAI	Rai 1	Final	Flavio Insinna and Federico Russo	
Italy	RAI	Rai Radio 2	All shows	Marco Ardemagni and Filippo Solibello	
Latvia	LTV	LTV1	All shows	Valters Frīdenbergs	
Latvia	LTV	LTV1	Final	Toms Grēviņš	
Lithuania	LRT	LRT, LRT HD, LRT Radijas	All shows	Darius Užkuraitis	
Macedonia	MRT	MRT 1	All shows	Karolina Petkovska	
Malta	PBS	TVM	All shows	Arthur Caruana	
Moldova	TRM	Moldova 1	All shows	Gloria Gorceag	
Moldova	TRM	Radio Moldova, Radio Moldova Muzical, Radio Moldova Tineret	All shows	Gloria Gorceag	
Montenegro	RTCG	TVCG 1, TVCG Sat	All shows	Dražen Bauković and Tijana Mišković	
Netherlands	AVROTROS	NPO 1, BVN	SF1/Final	Cornald Maas and Jan Smit	
Netherlands	AVROTROS	NPO 1, BVN	SF2	Cornald Maas, Jan Smit and Douwe Bob	
Norway	NRK	NRK1	All shows	Olav Viksmo-Slettan	
Norway	NRK	NRK3	Final	Ronny Brede Aase, Silje Nordnes and Markus Neby	
Norway	NRK	NRK P1	SF2/Final	Ole Christian Øen	
Poland	TVP	TVP1, TVP Polonia, TVP Rozrywka, TVP HD	All shows (Note: The three shows were broadcast on TVP Rozrywka and TVP HD with a one day delay.)	Artur Orzech	
Russia	RTR	Russia-1, Russia HD	All shows	Dmitry Guberniev and Ernest Mackevičius	
San Marino	SMRTV	San Marino RTV, Radio San Marino	All shows	Lia Fiorio and Gigi Restivo	
Serbia	RTS	RTS1, RTS HD, RTS SAT	SF1	Dragan Ilić	
Serbia	RTS	RTS1, RTS HD, RTS SAT	SF2/Final	Duška Vučinić	
Slovenia	RTVSLO	TV SLO 2	Semi-finals	Andrej Hofer	
Slovenia	RTVSLO	TV SLO 1	Final	Andrej Hofer	
Slovenia	RTVSLO	Radio Val 202	SF2/Final	Andrej Hofer	
Slovenia	RTVSLO	Radio Maribor	All shows	Andrej Hofer	
Spain	RTVE	La 2	Semi-finals	José María Íñigo and Julia Varela	
Spain	RTVE	La 1	Final	José María Íñigo and Julia Varela	
Sweden	SVT	SVT1	All shows	Lotta Bromé	
Sweden	SVT	SR P4	All shows	Carolina Norén and Björn Kjellman	
Switzerland	SRG SSR	SRF zwei	Semi-finals	Sven Epiney	
Switzerland	SRG SSR	SRF 1	Final	Sven Epiney	
Switzerland	SRG SSR	SRF 1, Radio SRF 3	Final	Peter Schneider and Gabriel Vetter	
Switzerland	SRG SSR	RTS Deux	SF2/Final	Jean-Marc Richard and Nicolas Tanner	
Switzerland	SRG SSR	RSI La 2	SF2	Clarissa Tami	
Switzerland	SRG SSR	RSI La 1	Final	Clarissa Tami and Michele "Cerno" Carobbio	
Ukraine	NTU	UA:Pershyi	All shows	Timur Miroshnychenko and Tetyana Terekhova	
Ukraine	UR		All shows	Olena Zelinchenko	
United Kingdom	BBC	BBC Four	Semi-finals	Scott Mills and Mel Giedroyc	
United Kingdom	BBC	BBC One	Final	Graham Norton	
United Kingdom	BBC	BBC Radio 2	Final	Ken Bruce	

Broadcasters and commentators in non-participating countries
Country/Territory	Broadcaster	Channel(s)	Show(s)	Commentator(s)	Ref(s)
China	HBS	Hunan Television	All shows	Kubert Leung and Wu Zhoutong	
Kazakhstan	Khabar	Khabar TV	All shows	Diana Snegina and Kaldybek Zhaysanbay	
Kosovo	RTK		All shows		
New Zealand	BBC UKTV		Final	Graham Norton	
Portugal	RTP	RTP1	All shows	Hélder Reis and Nuno Galopim	
Slovakia	RTVS		Final		
United States	Logo TV		Final	Carson Kressley and Michelle Collins	

=== International sign broadcast ===
SVT announced on 22 April 2016 that they would offer International Sign broadcasts of all three live shows for the hearing impaired. All three broadcasts were produced by Julia Kankkonen. The performances of competing entries were interpreted by ten sign language performers and the dialogue of hosts were interpreted by three sign language performers:

- Markus Aro (Finland)
- Ebru Bilen Basaran (Denmark)
- Vivien Batory (Denmark)
- Laith Fathulla (Sweden)
- Rafael-Evitan Grombelka (Germany)
- Amadeus Lantz (Sweden)
- Georg Marsh (Austria)
- Amina Ouahid (Sweden)
- Tommy Rangsjö (Sweden)
- Pavel Rodionov (Russia)
- Laura Levita Valytė (Lithuania)
- Kolbrún Völkudóttir (Iceland)
- Xuejia Rennie Zacsko (Sweden)

The international sign broadcasts was streamed online alongside the three live shows, with the following countries also televising the broadcasts:

- Austria – ORF 2 (final)
- Denmark – DR Ramasjang (all shows)
- Lithuania – LRT Kultūra (all shows)
- Norway – NRK Tegnspråk (all shows)
- Sweden – SVT24 (all shows)

== Incidents and controversies ==
=== Disqualification of Romania ===
Romania's participation was reported to be in danger on 19 April 2016 due to repeated non-payment of debts by Televiziunea Română (TVR) to the EBU, totalling CHF 16 million (€14.56 million) dating back to January 2007. The EBU had requested the Romanian government to repay the debt before 20 April or face exclusion from the contest. The EBU announced on 22 April that after the Romanian government had failed to repay the debt by the deadline, TVR were expelled from the EBU, consequently disqualifying Romania from the contest. The Director General of the EBU, Ingrid Deltenre, said that while "it is regrettable that we are forced to take this action [...] The continued indebtedness of TVR jeopardizes the financial stability of the EBU itself".

However, because the official album of the contest had been produced before the disqualification, the planned Romanian entry, "Moment of Silence", performed by Ovidiu Anton, would remain on both digital and physical copies of the album. The song had been written following the Colectiv nightclub fire in October 2015.

=== German artist replacement ===
Norddeutscher Rundfunk (NDR) announced on 19 November 2015 that Xavier Naidoo would represent Germany in the contest. However, his selection was criticised due to his history of expressing far-right political views in his actions and lyrics, including a speech made at a protest in 2014 supporting the assertion that the German Reich continues to exist within its pre-World War II borders, his propagation of conspiracy theories surrounding the September 11 attacks and the 2008 financial crisis, and a song in which he referred to Baron Rothschild as "Baron Deadschild" and a "schmuck", as well as a collaboration with Kool Savas titled "Wo sind sie jetzt?", which contained homophobic lyrics which were interpreted as associating homosexuality with paedophilia. Critics of his selection included Johannes Kahrs, who branded the decision "unspeakable and embarrassing", the Amadeu Antonio Foundation and Bild.

In light of the negative response and the need to quickly decide a new selection process, NDR withdrew its proposal to send Naidoo on 21 November. ARD co-ordinator Thomas Schreiber stated that "Xavier Naidoo is a brilliant singer who is, according to my own opinion, neither racist nor homophobe. It was clear that his nomination would polarise opinions, but we were surprised about the negative response. The Eurovision Song Contest is a fun event, in which music and the understanding between European people should be the focus. This characteristic must be kept at all costs."

=== Russian jury votes ===
The EBU announced on 10 May 2016 that they were investigating reports of possible rule violations after Russian jury member Anastasia Stotskaya streamed footage of the Russian jury deliberation during the dress rehearsal of the first semi-final on 9 May on the live-streaming social media site Periscope. The video showed one jury member not paying attention to the Dutch performance, while another jury member was filmed during the Armenian performance stating that she will support Armenia "because [her] husband is Armenian". The video also shows jury members on their phones during other performances, as well as a glimpse of Stotskaya's voting result, which also included notes evaluating performances. The rules of the contest stipulate that all jury members are to evaluate performances individually, without discussing the results with other jury members, a stipulation that was clearly violated by the Russian jury.

The EBU released a statement later on 10 May, stating that following talks with Russia-1, the broadcaster proposed to withdraw Stotskaya, declaring her voting results to be invalid, and provide a replacement judge for the final on 14 May. The statement also clarified that the other four jury members submitted a valid jury vote. The EBU also stated that while streaming a video online from the jury deliberation is not considered to be a breach of the rules of the contest, so long as individual rankings, combined rankings or jury points are kept confidential until after the final, it regards Stotskaya's actions "as not in keeping with the spirit of the contest and potentially prejudicial as it imposes a potential risk of accidentally revealing results".

=== Protests over flag policy ===
In ensuring the apolitical nature of the contest and the safety of attendees, the EBU released an official flag policy on 29 April 2016, which included a list of flags which would be banned from the three live shows. The President of the Basque Country, Iñigo Urkullu, and the Spanish Minister for Foreign Affairs and Cooperation, José Manuel García-Margallo, protested at the specific inclusion of the flag of the Basque Country alongside other flags such as those of some unrecognised nations and the Islamic State, and called on the organisers of the contest to rectify the issue. Radiotelevisión Española (RTVE) also expressed their concern to the EBU and requested a rectification, with the EBU responding, saying that while the flag of the Basque Country is not specifically forbidden, it is an example of a banned flag, adding that only the "official national flags of the 42 participating countries, or from one of the countries that have recently taken part", "official national flags of any of the other United Nations member states", the flag of Europe and the rainbow flag were permitted.

The EBU issued a statement later on 29 April, clarifying that it was not their intention to publish such a document, while acknowledging that the decision to publish a selection of flags of organisations and territories, each of which were "of a very different nature", was an insensitive one, and apologised for any offence caused by the publication of the original flag policy. The EBU also called on both the Avicii Arena and the contest's official ticketing partner AXS to publish an updated flag policy which did not include examples of banned flags.

The EBU released another statement on 6 May, stating that after discussing the matter with several participating delegations, the organisers of the contest had "agreed to relax the flag policy, and to allow national, regional and local flags of the participants" such as the Welsh flag (as Joe Woolford, representing the United Kingdom as part of Joe and Jake, is Welsh) and the Sami flag (as Agnete, representing Norway, is of Sami heritage), as well as the flags of all UN member states, the flag of the EU and the rainbow flag, as stated in the original flag policy. The EBU also proposed a more tolerant approach to other flags as long as attendees respect the apolitical nature of the contest and do not attempt to deliberately obstruct the camera views. Such a proposal was approved by the contest's Reference Group.

The Spanish Embassy in Stockholm filed a formal complaint to Swedish police on 15 May after a Spanish citizen carrying the flag of the Basque Country had his flag confiscated by security personnel and was asked along with two of his compatriots to leave the venue. After an urgent intervention by the Spanish Consul, who was present in the arena, the flag was returned to the attendees and they were permitted to return to the venue.

==== Nagorno-Karabakh flag dispute ====
Despite the official flag policy published by the EBU allowing only "national, regional and local flags of the participants" and banning the flag of the Nagorno-Karabakh Republic, during the first voting recap of the first semi-final on 10 May, the Armenian representative Iveta Mukuchyan was filmed in the green room holding the flag of the Nagorno-Karabakh Republic, sparking condemnation from the Azerbaijani press. The situation further escalated during the semi-final qualifiers' press conference afterwards, where a member of the Azerbaijani press criticised the Armenian delegation and the EBU for allowing the flag to be shown during the show. Responding to a question on the incident from a journalist from Aftonbladet, Mukuchyan stated: "My thoughts are with my Motherland. I want peace everywhere." Commenting on the situation, the Azerbaijani representative Samra stated that "Eurovision is a song contest and it's all about music."

The EBU and the contest's Reference Group released a joint statement on 11 May, strongly condemning Mukuchyan's actions during the first voting recap of the first semi-final and considering it "harmful" to the overall image of the contest. The Reference Group consequently sanctioned Public Television of Armenia (AMPTV), citing a breach of the rule stating that "no messages promoting any organisation, institution, political cause or other causes shall be allowed in the shows". Furthermore, the Reference Group has pointed out that a further breach of the rules of the contest could lead to disqualification from the contest or future contests. The spokesman for the Azerbaijani Ministry of Foreign Affairs, Hikmet Hajiyev, called Mukuchyan's actions "provocative" and unacceptable, claiming that "the Armenian side deliberately resorts to such steps to encourage and promote the illegal formation created in the occupied Azerbaijani territories".

=== Danish jury result ===
BT revealed on 15 May 2016 that Danish professional jury member Hilda Heick had submitted her ranking for the second semi-final and the final the wrong way round, ranking her favourite entry 26th while ranking her least-favourite entry first, in direct opposition to what she had intended to do. As a result of Heick's mistake, the points of the Danish jury would have been different:

- Instead of 10 points, Australia would have received 12;
- Instead of 7 points, the Netherlands would have received 10;
- Instead of 5 points, Lithuania would have received 1;
- Instead of 4 points, Sweden would have received 7;
- Instead of 2 points, Israel would have received 4;
- Instead of 1 point, Spain would have received 5;
- Instead of receiving no points, France and Russia would have received 2 and 3 points respectively.

The United Kingdom and Ukraine both would have failed to receive any points from the Danish jury. While the overall result was not affected, the margin between second-placed Australia and first-placed Ukraine would have been reduced from 23 points to 9 points.

=== Protests against the winner ===
The Ukrainian winning song, "1944" by Jamala, is about the deportation of the Crimean Tatars in 1944 and particularly about the singer's great-grandmother, who lost her daughter while being deported to Central Asia. Jamala's song was considered by Russian media and lawmakers to be critical of the Russian annexation of Crimea in 2014 and the war in Donbas. A petition was started on Change.org the day after the final, which called on the EBU to void the results in view of Ukraine winning overall despite placing second in both the jury and televote, but the EBU reaffirmed Ukraine's win in response. Later on, a video surfaced depicting Jamala performing "1944" four months before the eligibility date for commercial releases. However, the EBU concluded that "the song was eligible to compete", citing past relaxations of the rule.

== Other awards ==
In addition to the main winner's trophy, the Marcel Bezençon Awards and the Barbara Dex Award were contested during the 2016 Eurovision Song Contest. The OGAE, "General Organisation of Eurovision Fans" voting poll also took place before the contest.

=== Marcel Bezençon Awards ===
The Marcel Bezençon Awards, organised since 2002 by Sweden's then-Head of Delegation and 1992 representative Christer Björkman, and 1984 winner Richard Herrey, honours songs in the contest's final. The awards were divided into three categories: Artistic Award, Composers Award, and Press Award. The winners were revealed shortly before the final on 14 May.

Category	Country	Song	Artist	Songwriter(s)
Artistic Award	Ukraine	"1944"	Jamala	Jamala
Composers Award	Australia	"Sound of Silence"	Dami Im	Anthony Egizii; David Musumeci
Press Award	Russia	"You Are the Only One"	Sergey Lazarev	Philipp Kirkorov; Dimitris Kontopoulos; John Ballard; Ralph Charlie

=== OGAE ===
OGAE, an organisation of over forty Eurovision Song Contest fan clubs across Europe and beyond, conducts an annual voting poll first held in 2002 as the Marcel Bezençon Fan Award. The 2016 poll ran from 4 April to 2 May with votes from 45 clubs while Bulgaria and Moldova's ones abstained, and after all votes were cast, the top-ranked entry was France's "J'ai cherché" performed by Amir; the top five results are shown below.

Country	Song	Artist	Points
France	"J'ai cherché"	Amir	425
Russia	"You Are the Only One"	Sergey Lazarev	392
Australia	"Sound of Silence"	Dami Im	280
Bulgaria	"If Love Was a Crime"	Poli Genova	175
Italy	"No Degree of Separation"	Francesca Michielin	170

=== Barbara Dex Award ===
The Barbara Dex Award is a humorous fan award given to the worst dressed artist each year. Named after Belgium's representative who came last in the 1993 contest, wearing her self-designed dress, the award was handed since 1997. After 20 editions, this was the final poll organised by the fansite House of Eurovision, as they handed the reins to the fansite Songfestival.be shortly after the 2016 contest.

Place	Country	Artist	Votes
1	Croatia	Nina Kraljić	770
2	Germany	Jamie Lee	335
3	Switzerland	Rykka	201
4	Bulgaria	Poli Genova	140
5	Bosnia and Herzegovina	Dalal and Deen feat. Ana Rucner and Jala	127

== Official album ==
Cover art of the official album

Eurovision Song Contest: Stockholm 2016 is the official compilation album of the contest, put together by the European Broadcasting Union, which was released by Universal Music Group digitally on 15 April and physically on 22 April 2016. The album features all 42 participating entries including the semi-finalists that fail to qualify for the final, as well as the disqualified Romanian entry.

=== Charts ===
Chart (2016)	Peak position
Australian Albums (ARIA)	9
Austrian Albums (Ö3 Austria)	3
Finnish Albums (Suomen virallinen lista)	10
French Albums (SNEP)	81
German Compilation Albums (Offizielle Top 100)	2
Greek Albums (IFPI)	14
Norwegian Albums (VG-lista)	30
Swiss Albums (Schweizer Hitparade)	2
UK Compilation Albums (Official Charts)	9

== See also ==
- ABU Radio Song Festival 2016
- Eurovision Young Musicians 2016
- Junior Eurovision Song Contest 2016
