= Krive riječi =

Krive riječi Wrong Words

Studio album by Maya Sar
- Released: 1 June 2013
- Recorded: 2009–13: Long Play Studio, Sarajevo; Morris Studio, Zagreb
- Genre: pop; ballad
- Label: Aquarius Records; City Records
- Producer: Mahir Sarihodžić; Filip Vidović (assistant producer)

Singles from Krive riječi
- 1. "Krive riječi" Released: 7 September 2012; 2. "O meni nikom ne pričaj" Released: 1 June 2013

Krive riječi (English: Wrong Words) is the debut studio album by Bosnian pop-ballad singer Maya Sar. It was released 1 June 2013 through Hayat Production in Bosnia and Herzegovina, Aquarius Records in Croatia, and City Records in Montenegro and Serbia. Wrong Words came a year after Sar competed in the Eurovision Song Contest 2012 with the song "Korake ti znam".

== Background ==
Sar worked on the album for four years, recording in ten different studios in and around Bosnia. The entire album was mainly produced by Sar's husband Mahir Sarihodžić with assistant producer Filip Vidović.

== Singles ==
The title song was released as the lead single on 7 September 2012.

== Track listing ==
All songs were written solely by Maya Sar herself.

No.	Title	Length
1.	"Krive riječi" (Wrong Words)	4:02
2.	"O meni nikom ne pričaj (featuring Marijan Brkić Brk)" (Don't Talk to Anyone About Me)	3:40
3.	"Milovanja" (Caress)	4:24
4.	"Dilema" (Dilemma)	4:22
5.	"More nemira" (Sea of Unrest)	4:34
6.	"Ne brini" (Don't Worry)	5:31
7.	"Neću da šutim" (I Don't Want to Be Quiet)	2:56
8.	"Nespretno" (Awkwardly)	4:14
9.	"Bilo je vrijeme" (It Was Time)	4:45
10.	"Korake ti znam" (I Know Your Steps)	3:01
11.	"Više nego ikada" (More Than Ever)	4:33
12.	"Moj je život moja pjesma (featuring Nina Badrić, Karolina Gočeva, Aleksandra Radović)" (My Life is My Song)	3:51
