= Erato (duo) =

- Origin: Sarajevo, Bosnia and Herzegovina
- Genres: R&B, pop
- Years active: 1999–2009
- Labels: JRTVSB&H, Hayat Production
- Members: Aida Terzić (nee Jašarević); Dalal Midhat-Talakić
- Website: Erato.ba

Erato was a Bosnian R&B duo consisting of Aida Jašarević and Dalal Midhat. The band began with five girls but after three members quit due to lack of singing ability, the band became a duo with Jašarević and Midhat continuing on. The band has released two albums; Backstage (2003) and Make Up (2005).

The duo's name comes from the muse.

In October 2008, the duo reached the Bosnian Top 10 with "Putujemo Snovima", a track that featured Croatian singer Jacques Houdek.
