= Ana Rucner =

Croatian cellist (born 1983)

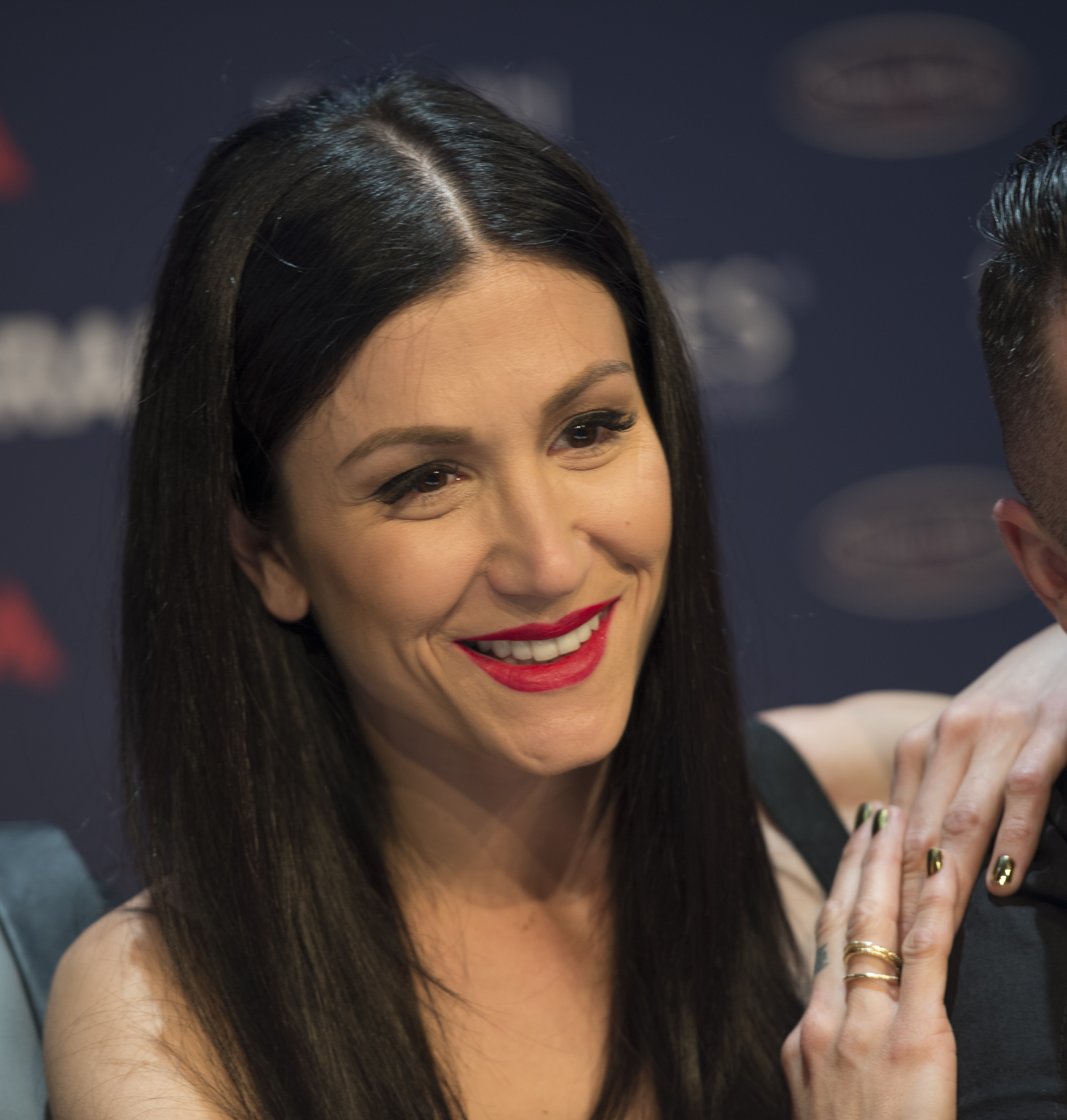
- Rucner in 2016

Background information
- Born: 12 February 1983 (age 43); Zagreb, SR Croatia, SFR Yugoslavia
- Occupation: Cellist
- Instrument: Cello
- Labels: Croatia; Hit
- Website: www.anarucner.com

Ana Rucner (born 12 February 1983) is a Croatian cellist. She represented Bosnia and Herzegovina in the Eurovision Song Contest 2016 with Dalal Midhat-Talakić, Deen and Jasmin Fazlić Jala with the song "Ljubav je" performing it on 10 May 2016 in the first semi-final but failed to qualify to the final.

In the 2017 Zagreb local elections Rucner was elected member of the Zagreb City Assembly as a candidate of Milan Bandić's party list.

She was married to Croatian singer Vlado Kalember and has one child with him.

== Discography ==
- Expression (2012)
- Vječne uspavanke (2014)
- Croatian Heritage (2020)
- Balkanija (2025)

Preceded by "Korake ti znam"	Bosnia and Herzegovina in the Eurovision Song Contest; 2016 "Ljubav je"	Succeeded by None (the country withdrew from the contest)
