= Poland in the Eurovision Song Contest 2016 =

- Eurovision Song Contest 2016
- Participating broadcaster: Telewizja Polska (TVP)
- Country: Poland
- Selection process: Krajowe Eliminacje 2016
- Selection date: 5 March 2016

Competing entry
- Song: "Color of Your Life"
- Artist: Michał Szpak
- Songwriters: Andy Palmer; Kamil Varen

Placement
- Semi-final result: Qualified (6th, 151 points)
- Final result: 8th, 229 points

Participation chronology

Poland was represented at the Eurovision Song Contest 2016 with the song "Color of Your Life" written by Andy Palmer and Kamil Varen. The song was performed by Michał Szpak. The Polish broadcaster Telewizja Polska (TVP) first announced in October 2015 that the Polish entry for the 2016 contest in Stockholm, Sweden would be selected through an internal selection. However, the broadcaster later decided to organise the national final Krajowe Eliminacje 2016 in order to select the Polish entry. The national final took place on 5 March 2016 and featured nine entries. "Color of Your Life" performed by Michał Szpak was selected as the winner after gaining 35.89% of the public vote.

Poland was drawn to compete in the second semi-final of the Eurovision Song Contest which took place on 12 May 2016. Performing during the show in position 2, "Color of Your Life" was announced among the top 10 entries of the second semi-final and therefore qualified to compete in the final on 14 May. It was later revealed that Poland placed sixth out of the 18 participating countries in the semi-final with 151 points. In the final, Poland performed in position 12 and placed eighth out of the 26 participating countries, scoring 229 points.

== Background ==
Prior to the 2016 contest, Poland had participated in the Eurovision Song Contest eighteen times since its first entry in 1994. Poland's highest placement in the contest, to this point, has been second place, which the nation achieved with its debut entry in 1994 with the song "To nie ja!" performed by Edyta Górniak. Poland has only, thus far, reached the top ten on one other occasion, when Ich Troje performing the song "Keine Grenzen – Żadnych granic" finished seventh in 2003. Between 2005 and 2011, Poland failed to qualify from the semi-final round six out of seven years with only their 2008 entry, "For Life" performed by Isis Gee, managing to take the nation to the final during that period. After once again failing to qualify to the final in 2011, the country withdrew from the contest during 2012 and 2013. Since returning to the contest in 2014, Poland managed to qualify to the final with both their 2014 entry, "My Słowianie - We Are Slavic" performed by Donatan and Cleo, and their 2015 entry "In the Name of Love" performed by Monika Kuszyńska.

The Polish national broadcaster, Telewizja Polska (TVP), broadcasts the event within Poland and organises the selection process for the nation's entry. TVP confirmed Poland's participation in the 2016 Eurovision Song Contest on 10 October 2015. Between 2006 and 2011, TVP organised televised national finals that featured a competition among several artists and songs in order to select the Polish entry for the Eurovision Song Contest. After returning to the contest in 2014 following their two-year absence, the broadcaster opted to internally select both the 2014 and 2015 entries. In October 2015, TVP announced that the Polish entry for the 2016 Eurovision Song Contest would be selected via an internal selection and would be presented in February 2016. However, on 26 January 2016, the director of TVP1, Jan Pawlicki, announced that the Polish entry would be selected via a national final; the last time the Polish entry was selected via a national final was in 2011.

== Before Eurovision ==
=== Media law controversy ===
After the winner of the 2015 Polish parliamentary election, Law and Justice party, proposed a new media law, doubts regarding the country's participation in the 2016 Eurovision Song Contest were reported across international media outlets. The new law was widely perceived as the government's way of limiting freedom of the press as well as putting the media, such as the Polish national broadcaster Telewizja Polska, under government control with further concerns surrounding the issue stemming from the wider Polish Constitutional Court crisis. Based on the reported information, news outlets speculated that Poland would be expelled from the European Broadcasting Union (EBU) over the freedom of the press concerns and therefore would be unable to participate in the Eurovision Song Contest without full EBU membership. On 15 January 2016, the EBU denied that Poland's participation in the 2016 contest was in question.

=== Krajowe Eliminacje 2016 ===
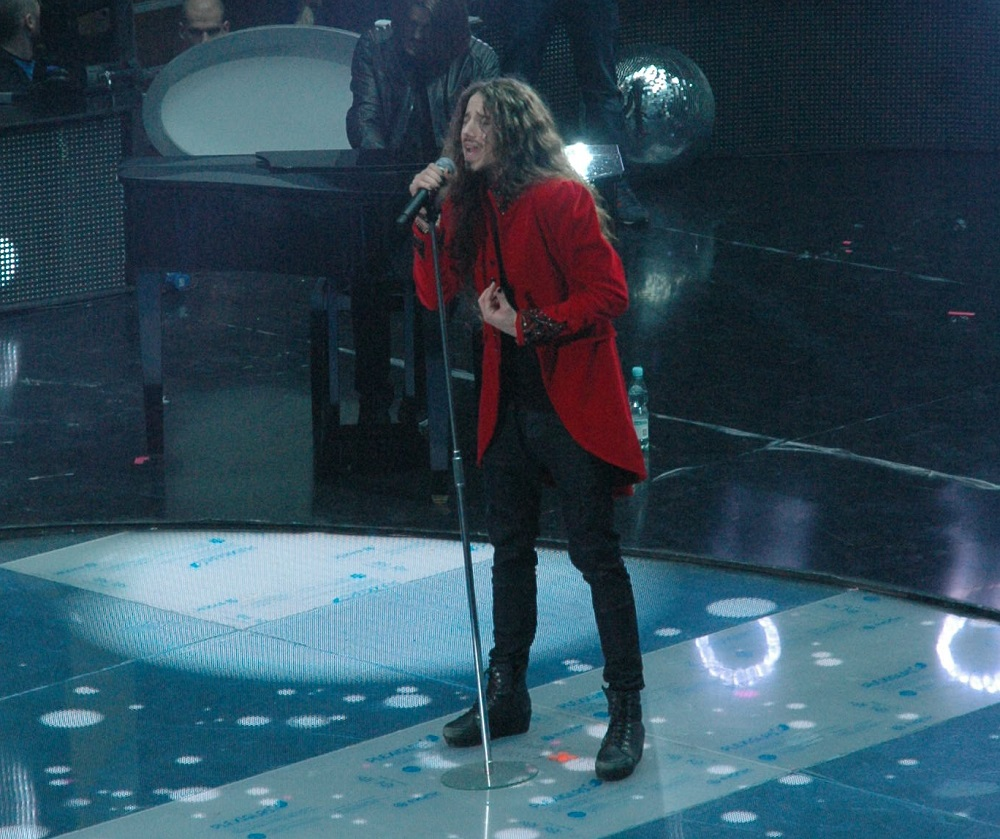
Michał Szpak performing during a rehearsal for Krajowe Eliminacje 2016

Krajowe Eliminacje 2016 was the national final organised by TVP in order to select the Polish entry for the Eurovision Song Contest 2016. The show took place on 5 March 2016 at the TVP Headquarters in Warsaw, hosted by Artur Orzech. Public televoting exclusively selected the winner. The show was broadcast on TVP1 and TVP Polonia as well as streamed online at the broadcaster's website eurowizja.tvp.pl. The national final was watched by 2.38 million viewers in Poland.

==== Competing entries ====
TVP opened a submission period for interested artists and songwriters to submit their entries between 28 January 2016 and 8 February 2016. The broadcaster received 88 submissions at the closing of the deadline. A five-member selection committee selected nine entries from the received submissions to compete in the national final. The selection committee consisted of Anna Will (Polish Radio), Artur Orzech (Eurovision commentator, radio and television journalist and presenter), Zygmunt Kukla (conductor, composer), Robert Janowski (singer, composer, TV host and actor) and Waldemar Skowroński (journalist). The selected entries were announced on 16 February 2016 during the TVP1 programme Świat się kręci, hosted by Artur Orzech. Among the competing artists was Edyta Górniak, who represented Poland in the Eurovision Song Contest in 1994. "My Universe", performed by Napoli, was the runner-up in the 2016 Belarusian Eurovision national final. Between 23 February and 4 March, each competing artist presented their entry with a live performance during broadcasts of Świat się kręci. The competing artists were required to submit a promotional video for their song to TVP by 1 March 2016.

Artist	Song	Songwriter(s)
Dorota Osińska	"Universal"	Rick Allison, Tinatin Japaridze, Phil Galdston
Edyta Górniak	"Grateful"	Karolina Alexandra Covington, Monika Borzym-Janowska, Mariusz Bogdan Obijalski, Robert Kamil Lewandowski
Kasia Moś	"Addiction"	Kasia Moś, Mateusz Moś, Paweł Olszówka
Margaret	"Cool Me Down"	Robert Uhlmann, Arash, Alex Papaconstantinou, Anderz Wrethov, Viktor Svensson, Linnea Deb
Michał Szpak	"Color of Your Life"	Andy Palmer, Kamil Varen
Napoli	"My Universe"	Leonid Shirin, Natalia Tambovtseva
Natalia Szroeder	"Lustra"	Marcin "Liber" Piotrowski, Natalia Szroeder, Szymon Chodyniecki, Przemysław Puk, Marcin Górecki
Ola Gintrowska	"Missing"	Robert Janson, Aleksandra Gintrowska
Taraka	"In the Rain"	Karol Kus, Alicja Golianek

==== Final ====
The televised final took place on 5 March 2016. Nine entries competed and the winner, "Color of Your Life" performed by Michał Szpak, was determined entirely by a public vote. In addition to the performances of the competing entries, 2015 Polish Eurovision entrant Monika Kuszyńska opened the show with her Eurovision song "In the Name of Love", while 2001 Polish Eurovision entrant Andrzej Piaseczny performed as the interval act.

Final – 5 March 2016
R/O	Artist	Song	Televote	Place
1	Taraka	"In the Rain"	2.26%	7
2	Napoli	"My Universe"	0.59%	9
3	Natalia Szroeder	"Lustra"	4.20%	5
4	Dorota Osińska	"Universal"	8.71%	4
5	Kasia Moś	"Addiction"	3.39%	6
6	Ola Gintrowska	"Missing"	1.74%	8
7	Michał Szpak	"Color of Your Life"	35.89%	1
8	Margaret	"Cool Me Down"	24.72%	2
9	Edyta Górniak	"Grateful"	18.49%	3

=== Promotion ===
Michał Szpak made several appearances across Europe to specifically promote "Color of Your Life" as the Polish Eurovision entry. On 9 April, Szpak performed during the Eurovision in Concert event which was held at the Melkweg venue in Amsterdam, Netherlands and hosted by Cornald Maas and Hera Björk. Between 11 and 13 April, Michał Szpak took part in promotional activities in Tel Aviv, Israel and performed during the Israel Calling event held at the Ha'teatron venue. On 17 April, Szpak performed during the London Eurovision Party, which was held at the Café de Paris venue in London, United Kingdom and hosted by Nicki French and Paddy O'Connell.

== At Eurovision ==
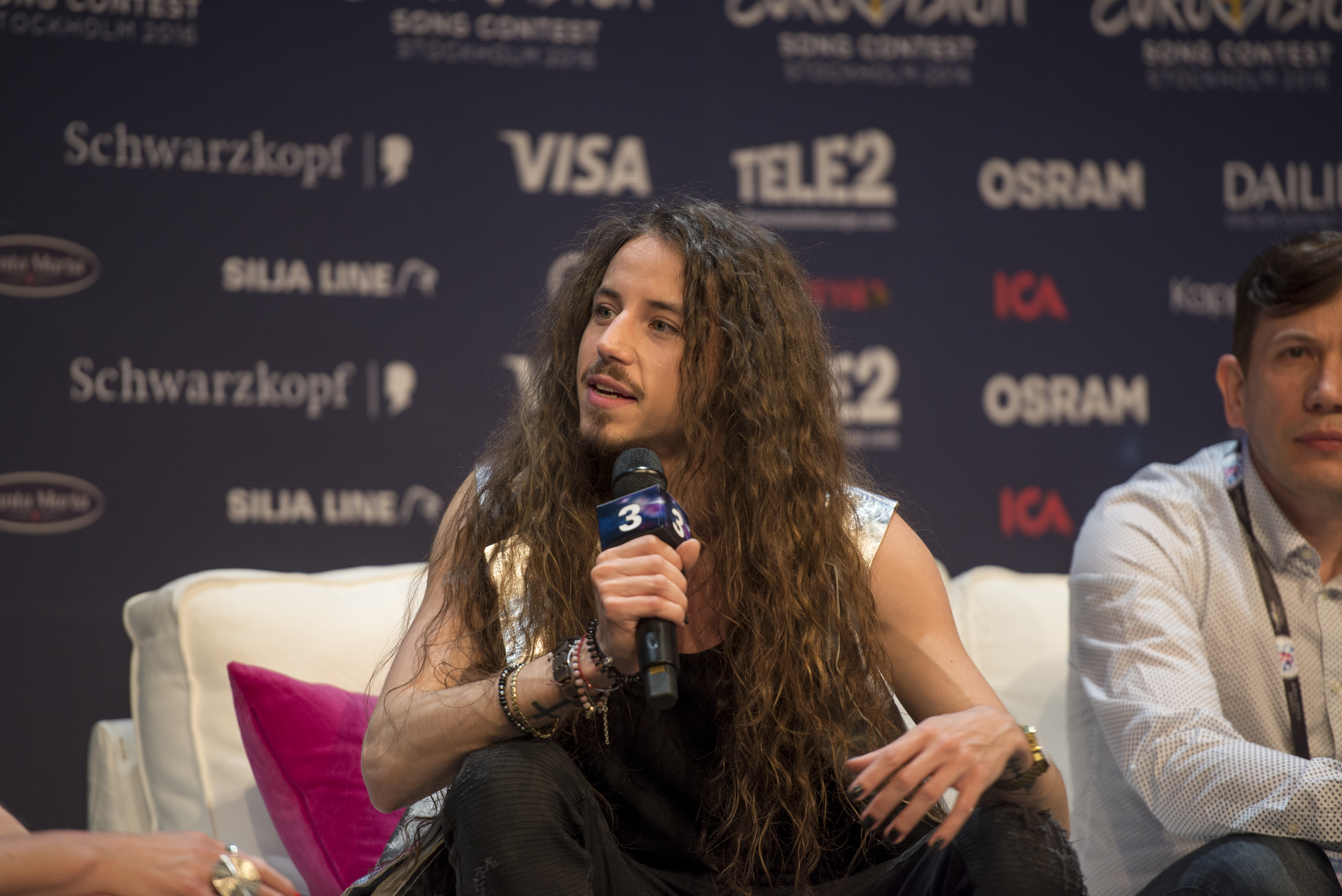
Michał Szpak during a press meet and greet

According to Eurovision rules, all nations with the exceptions of the host country and the "Big Five" (France, Germany, Italy, Spain and the United Kingdom) are required to qualify from one of two semi-finals in order to compete for the final; the top ten countries from each semi-final progress to the final. The European Broadcasting Union (EBU) split up the competing countries into six different pots based on voting patterns from previous contests, with countries with favourable voting histories put into the same pot. On 25 January 2016, a special allocation draw was held which placed each country into one of the two semi-finals, as well as which half of the show they would perform in. Poland was placed into the second semi-final, to be held on 12 May 2016, and was scheduled to perform in the first half of the show.

Once all the competing songs for the 2016 contest had been released, the running order for the semi-finals was decided by the shows' producers rather than through another draw, so that similar songs were not placed next to each other. Poland was set to perform in position 2, following the entry from Latvia and before the entry from Switzerland.

The two semi-finals and the final were broadcast in Poland on TVP1 and TVP Polonia with commentary by Artur Orzech. The three shows also aired on a one-day delay on TVP Rozrywka and TVP HD. The Polish spokesperson, who announced the top 12-point score awarded by the Polish jury during the final, was Anna Popek.

=== Semi-final ===
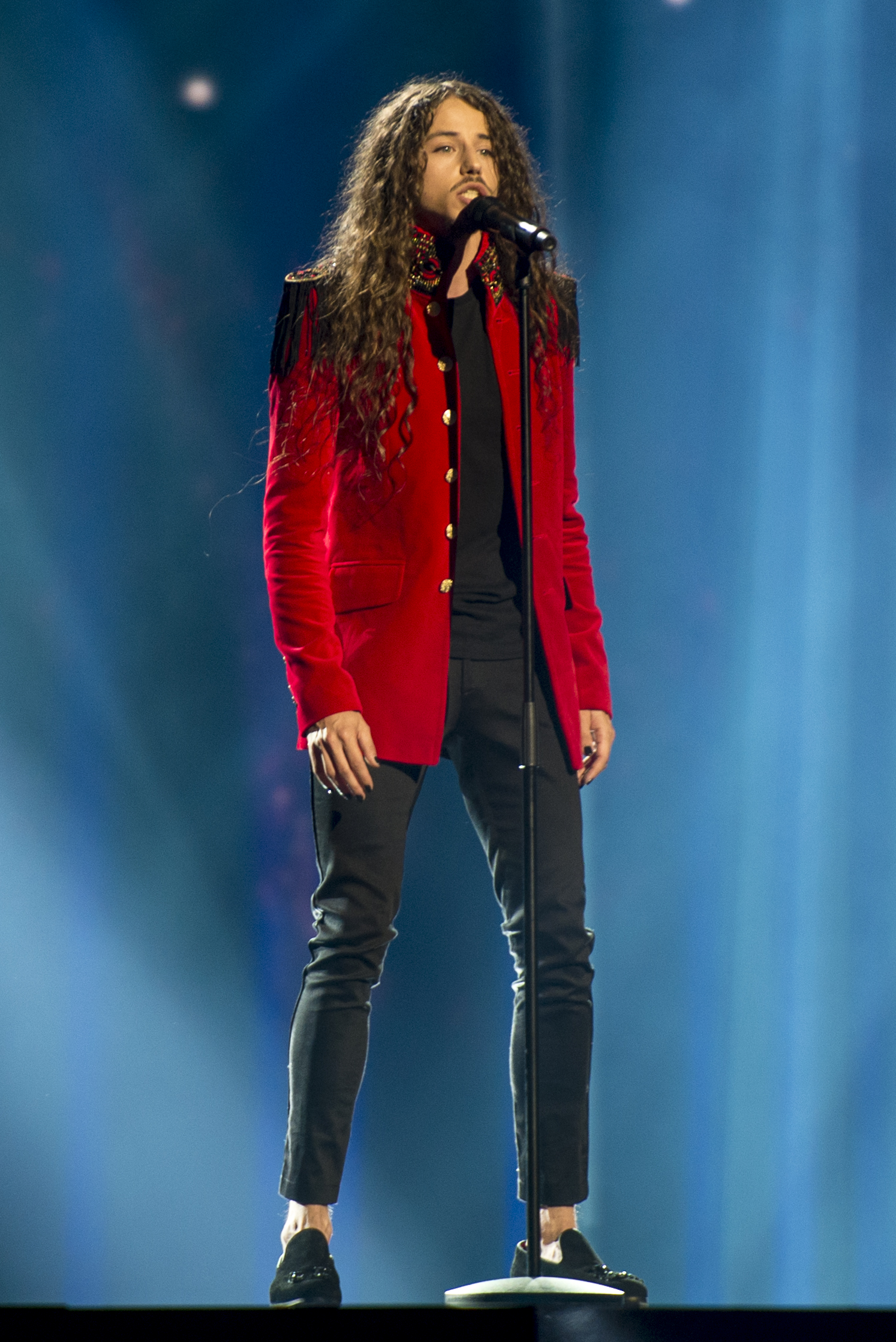
Michał Szpak during a rehearsal before the second semi-final

Michał Szpak took part in technical rehearsals on 4 and 7 May, followed by dress rehearsals on 11 and 12 May. This included the jury show on 11 May where the professional juries of each country watched and voted on the competing entries.

The Polish performance featured Michał Szpak performing in a red and black costume flanked by a pianist and cellist on one side of the stage and three violists on the other. The stage was predominately dark with the LED screens displaying stars and lyrics from the song. The musicians that joined Szpak on stage were: Adrian Adamski (pianist) and members of the OWEE String Quartet, Ewelina Osowska (violinist), Weronika Janik (violinist), Oliwia Kędziora (violinist) and Ewa Leszczyńska (cellist).

At the end of the show, Poland was announced as having finished in the top 10 and subsequently qualifying for the grand final. It was later revealed that Poland placed sixth in the semi-final, receiving a total of 151 points: 131 points from the televoting and 20 points from the juries.

=== Final ===
Shortly after the second semi-final, a winners' press conference was held for the ten qualifying countries. As part of this press conference, the qualifying artists took part in a draw to determine which half of the grand final they would subsequently participate in. This draw was done in the reverse order the countries appeared in the semi-final running order. Poland was drawn to compete in the first half. Following this draw, the shows' producers decided upon the running order of the final, as they had done for the semi-finals. Poland was subsequently placed to perform in position 12, following the entry from France and before the entry from Australia.

Michał Szpak once again took part in dress rehearsals on 13 and 14 May before the final, including the jury final where the professional juries cast their final votes before the live show. Michał Szpak performed a repeat of his semi-final performance during the final on 14 May. Poland placed eighth in the final, scoring 229 points: 222 points from the televoting and 7 points from the juries.

=== Voting ===
Voting during the three shows was conducted under a new system that involved each country now awarding two sets of points from 1-8, 10 and 12: one from their professional jury and the other from televoting. Each nation's jury consisted of five music industry professionals who are citizens of the country they represent, with their names published before the contest to ensure transparency. This jury judged each entry based on: vocal capacity; the stage performance; the song's composition and originality; and the overall impression by the act. In addition, no member of a national jury was permitted to be related in any way to any of the competing acts in such a way that they cannot vote impartially and independently. The individual rankings of each jury member as well as the nation's televoting results were released shortly after the grand final.

Below is a breakdown of points awarded to Poland and awarded by Poland in the second semi-final and grand final of the contest, and the breakdown of the jury voting and televoting conducted during the two shows:

==== Points awarded to Poland ====
Points awarded to Poland (Semi-final 2)
Score	Televote	Jury
12 points	Belgium; Germany; Ukraine	
10 points	Ireland; Italy; Norway; United Kingdom	
8 points		
7 points	Georgia; Lithuania; Switzerland	
6 points	Belarus; Bulgaria; Denmark; Israel	
5 points		
4 points	Latvia; Slovenia	Norway
3 points		Georgia; Italy; Lithuania; Slovenia
2 points		Albania
1 point	Macedonia; Serbia	Serbia; Ukraine

Points awarded to Poland (Final)
Score	Televote	Jury
12 points	Austria; Belgium	
10 points	Germany; Iceland; Ireland; Italy; Netherlands; Norway; Sweden; United Kingdom	
8 points	Hungary; Ukraine	
7 points	Czech Republic; France; San Marino	
6 points	Belarus; Bulgaria; Lithuania	
5 points	Albania; Denmark; Finland; Latvia; Russia; Spain; Switzerland	
4 points	Croatia; Georgia; Israel; Slovenia	
3 points	Azerbaijan; Greece	Lithuania
2 points	Cyprus; Macedonia	Azerbaijan
1 point	Armenia; Estonia	Montenegro; Norway

==== Points awarded by Poland ====
Points awarded by Poland (Semi-final 2)
Score	Televote	Jury
12 points	Ukraine	Ukraine
10 points	Australia	Australia
8 points	Belarus	Israel
7 points	Georgia	Georgia
6 points	Belgium	Latvia
5 points	Latvia	Bulgaria
4 points	Bulgaria	Belarus
3 points	Lithuania	Lithuania
2 points	Ireland	Belgium
1 point	Denmark	Serbia

Points awarded by Poland (Final)
Score	Televote	Jury
12 points	Ukraine	Ukraine
10 points	Sweden	Australia
8 points	Russia	Georgia
7 points	Australia	Israel
6 points	Hungary	Latvia
5 points	Latvia	Spain
4 points	Austria	Czech Republic
3 points	Bulgaria	Bulgaria
2 points	Armenia	Lithuania
1 point	Cyprus	France

==== Detailed voting results ====
The following members comprised the Polish jury:

- Jakub Raczyński (jury chairperson) – musician
- Jacek Kęcik – director, screenwriter
- Marcin Kusy – journalist
- Monika Kuszyńska – artist, singer, represented Poland in the 2015 contest
- Artur Zieliński – member of OGAE Poland

Detailed voting results from Poland (Semi-final 2)
R/O	Country	Jury							Televote	
R/O	Country	J. Raczyński	J. Kęcik	M. Kusy	M. Kuszyńska	A. Zieliński	Rank	Points	Rank	Points
01	Latvia	10	6	6	10	5	5	6	6	5
02	Poland									
03	Switzerland	16	13	17	15	16	17		15	
04	Israel	2	12	4	2	7	3	8	13	
05	Belarus	11	3	5	14	9	7	4	3	8
06	Serbia	14	7	8	11	6	10	1	16	
07	Ireland	17	16	10	17	12	15		9	2
08	Macedonia	12	4	15	13	8	13		14	
09	Lithuania	6	5	9	6	17	8	3	8	3
10	Australia	3	1	3	3	2	2	10	2	10
11	Slovenia	8	14	7	8	10	11		12	
12	Bulgaria	5	15	13	4	3	6	5	7	4
13	Denmark	15	17	16	16	11	16		10	1
14	Ukraine	1	2	1	1	1	1	12	1	12
15	Norway	7	11	11	7	15	12		11	
16	Georgia	9	9	2	9	4	4	7	4	7
17	Albania	13	8	14	12	13	14		17	
18	Belgium	4	10	12	5	14	9	2	5	6

Detailed voting results from Poland (Final)
R/O	Country	Jury							Televote	
R/O	Country	J. Raczyński	J. Kęcik	M. Kusy	M. Kuszyńska	A. Zieliński	Rank	Points	Rank	Points
01	Belgium	11	14	17	9	21	16		14	
02	Czech Republic	5	11	21	10	7	7	4	19	
03	Netherlands	10	22	15	7	22	17		17	
04	Azerbaijan	14	20	24	14	20	22		20	
05	Hungary	22	19	6	20	10	18		5	6
06	Italy	17	9	13	17	12	15		16	
07	Israel	3	10	8	2	18	4	7	18	
08	Bulgaria	9	18	16	8	6	8	3	8	3
09	Sweden	18	4	5	22	15	12		2	10
10	Germany	23	8	23	21	13	21		21	
11	France	13	23	9	12	4	10	1	15	
12	Poland									
13	Australia	2	2	4	3	2	2	10	4	7
14	Cyprus	25	24	12	24	23	25		10	1
15	Serbia	20	16	14	16	14	19		25	
16	Lithuania	4	7	19	5	24	9	2	11	
17	Croatia	21	17	20	23	16	23		24	
18	Russia	19	3	7	18	17	13		3	8
19	Spain	12	13	3	19	3	6	5	12	
20	Latvia	7	12	10	4	11	5	6	6	5
21	Ukraine	1	1	1	1	1	1	12	1	12
22	Malta	16	21	22	13	9	20		23	
23	Georgia	15	5	2	11	8	3	8	13	
24	Austria	24	6	25	25	25	24		7	4
25	United Kingdom	6	25	11	6	19	14		22	
26	Armenia	8	15	18	15	5	11		9	2
