= Badminton (Samra song) =

Single by Samra
- Language: Russian
- Released: June 22, 2017
- Genre: Pop; R&B
- Length: 2:55
- Songwriter(s): Boqdan Bespalov
- Producer(s): Ilaha Bakhshiyeva

Samra singles chronology
| "Miracle" (2016) | "Badminton" (2017) | "Ters Gedir" (2017) |

"Badminton" is a song recorded by Azerbaijani singer and rapper Samra and the follow-up to her Eurovision Song Contest 2016 entry "Miracle". The track was released on June 22, 2017, as a stand-alone single. It was written by Boqdan Bespalov.

== Reception ==
The track received generally favourable reviews from critics. William Lee Adams of Wiwibloggs described the song and its lyrics as "a strong vibe that suggests a woman in control". Ryan Cobb of ESCXtra observed the track's contrast in sound to her previous Scandinavian-produced single "Miracle", noting the urban and R&B influences within the song.

== Music video ==
The music video was released at the same time as the single and was directed by Ali Farhad. The video shows Samra performing choreography in multiple sports outfits, occasionally holding a badminton racket, with a background colour-scheme of pink and blue. The sensuality and simplicity of the music video raised comparisons with the videography of fellow female rapper Nicki Minaj, particularly the music video of the 2014 song "Anaconda".
