= Netherlands in the Eurovision Song Contest 2016 =

- Eurovision Song Contest 2016
- Participating broadcaster: AVROTROS
- Country: Netherlands
- Selection process: Internal selection
- Announcement date: Artist: 22 September 2015; Song: 4 March 2016

Competing entry
- Song: "Slow Down"
- Artist: Douwe Bob
- Songwriters: Douwe Bob; Jan Peter Hoekstra; Jeroen Overman; Matthijs van Duijvenbode

Placement
- Semi-final result: Qualified (5th, 197 points)
- Final result: 11th, 153 points

Participation chronology

The Netherlands was represented at the Eurovision Song Contest 2016 with the song "Slow Down", written by Douwe Bob, Jan Peter Hoekstra, Jeroen Overman, and Matthijs van Duijvenbode, and performed by Douwe Bob himself. The Dutch participating broadcaster, AVROTROS, internally selected its entry for the contest. Douwe Bob's appointment as the Dutch representative was announced on 22 September 2015, while the song, "Slow Down", was presented to the public on 4 March 2016.

The Netherlands was drawn to compete in the first semi-final of the Eurovision Song Contest which took place on 10 May 2016. Performing during the show in position 6, "Slow Down" was announced among the top 10 entries of the first semi-final and therefore qualified to compete in the final on 14 May. It was later revealed that the Netherlands placed fifth out of the 18 participating countries in the semi-final with 197 points. In the final, the Netherlands placed eleventh out of the 26 participating countries, scoring 153 points.

== Background ==
Prior to the 2016 contest, AVROTROS and its predecessor national broadcasters have participated in the Eurovision Song Contest representing the Netherlands fifty-six times since NTS début in 1956. They have won the contest four times: in 1957 with the song "Net als toen" performed by Corry Brokken; in 1959 with the song "'n Beetje" performed by Teddy Scholten; in 1969 as one of four countries to tie for first place with "De troubadour" performed by Lenny Kuhr; and finally in 1975 with "Ding-a-dong" performed by the group Teach-In. Following the introduction of semi-finals for the 2004 contest, the Netherlands had featured in only three finals. The Dutch least successful result has been last place, which they have achieved on five occasions, most recently in the second semi-final of the 2011 contest. The Netherlands has also received nul points on two occasions; in 1962 and 1963.

As part of its duties as participating broadcaster, AVROTROS organises the selection of its entry in the Eurovision Song Contest and broadcasts the event in the country. The Dutch broadcaster has used various methods to select its entry in the past, such as the Nationaal Songfestival, a live televised national final to choose the performer, song or both to compete at Eurovision. However, internal selections have also been held on occasion. Since 2013, the Dutch broadcaster has internally selected its entry for the contest. In 2013, the internal selection of "Birds" by Anouk managed to take the country to the final for the first time in eight years and placed ninth overall. In 2014, the internal selection of "Calm After the Storm" by the Common Linnets qualified the nation to the final once again and placed second, making it the most successful Dutch result in the contest since their victory in 1975. For 2016, AVROTROS opted to continue selecting its entry through an internal selection.

== Before Eurovision ==
=== Internal selection ===
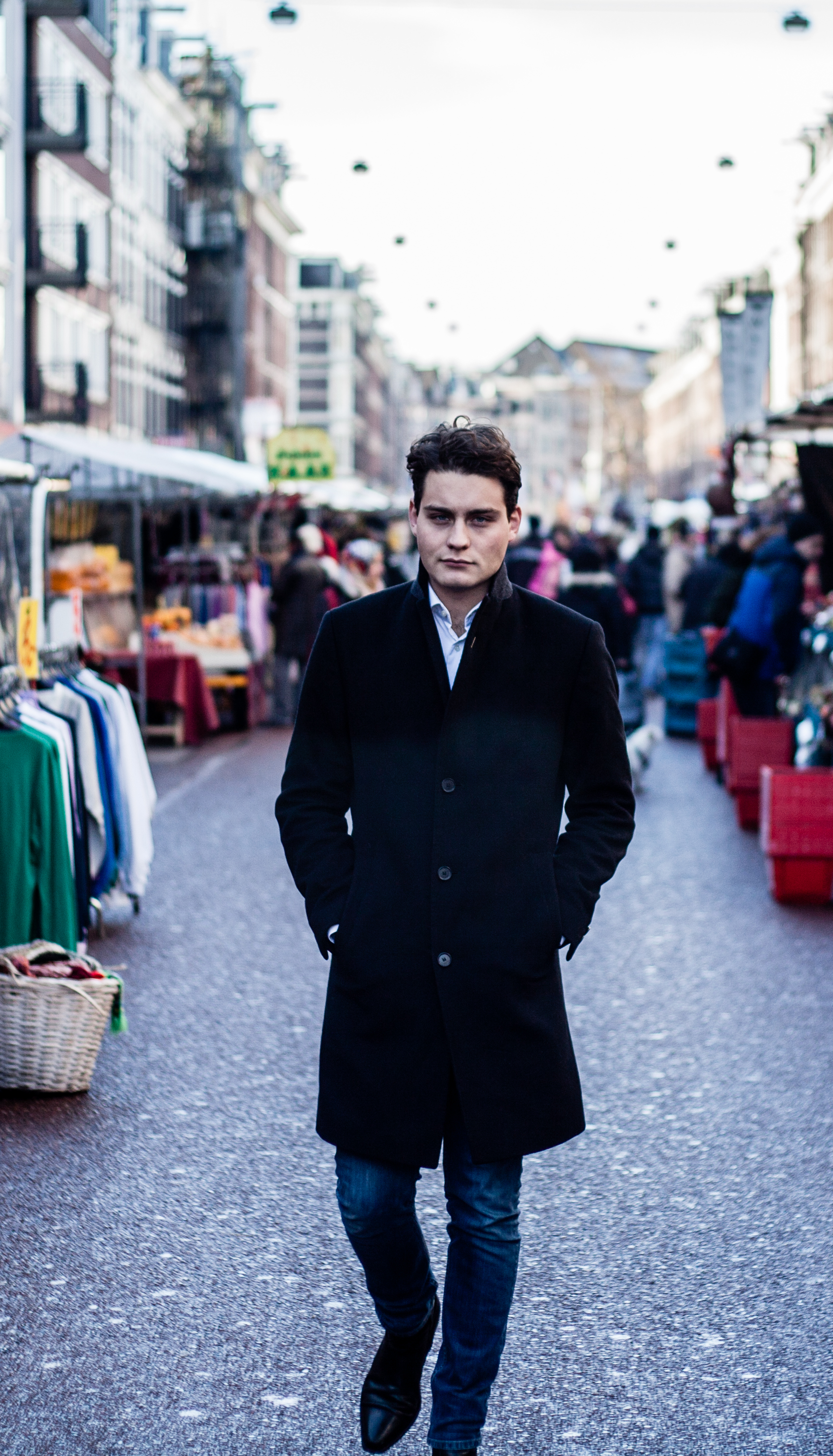
Douwe Bob was internally selected to represent the Netherlands in the Eurovision Song Contest 2016

Following Trijntje Oosterhuis' failure to qualify to the final in 2015 with the song "Walk Along", the AVROTROS issued a statement to the current affairs programme EenVandaag where they revealed that the broadcaster would continue to internally select both the artist and song for the Eurovision Song Contest and that several artists had already been in contact with the broadcaster in regards to participating. Artists that were rumoured in Dutch media to be in talks with AVROTROS included singer Dotan and the winners of the reality singing competition The Voice of Holland Iris Kroes, who won the second series, and O'G3NE, who won the fifth series.

On 20 September 2015, Dutch media reported that AVROTROS had selected singer Douwe Bob to represent the Netherlands at the 2016 contest. Douwe Bob was confirmed as the Dutch entrant on 22 September 2015 during the Dutch talk show De Wereld Draait Door. The selection of Douwe Bob as the Dutch representative occurred through a unanimous decision by a selection commission consisting of singer and television host Jan Smit, television host and author Cornald Maas, radio DJ Daniël Dekker and AVROTROS media-director Remco van Leen. During his interview on De Wereld Draait Door, Douwe Bob revealed that the selected song was an uptempo track that he recorded in Andalusia while working on material for an upcoming album.

On 4 March 2016, Douwe Bob's Eurovision entry, "Slow Down", was presented to the public during a press conference that took place in Amsterdam. The presentation was streamed online by AVROTROS via the Periscope live video streaming app, while the song was premiered at the same time during the NPO Radio 2 programme Aan De Slag!, hosted by Bart Arens. The official video for the song directed by Hans Pannecouke was released on the same day. Douwe Bob revealed earlier during an interview for the media platform 3VOOR12 on 15 January 2016 that his Eurovision song was written by Jan Peter Hoekstra, Jeroen Overman, Matthijs van Duijvenbode and Douwe Bob himself.

=== Promotion ===
In the lead up to the Eurovision Song Contest, Douwe Bob's promotional activities occurred entirely within the Netherlands where he performed at live events, radio shows and talk shows. On 9 April, Douwe Bob performed during the Eurovision in Concert event which was held at the Melkweg venue in Amsterdam and hosted by Cornald Maas and Hera Björk. On 21 April, Douwe Bob released the new single, "Jacob's Song", which followed "Slow Down" as the next single from his album Fool Bar, which was released on 6 May. On 28 April, Douwe Bob performed a concert at the Westergasfabriek theatre in Amsterdam prior to travelling to Stockholm, which was partially broadcast live during the NPO 1 programme De Wereld Draait Door and streamed online in full at the television programme's website.

== At Eurovision ==
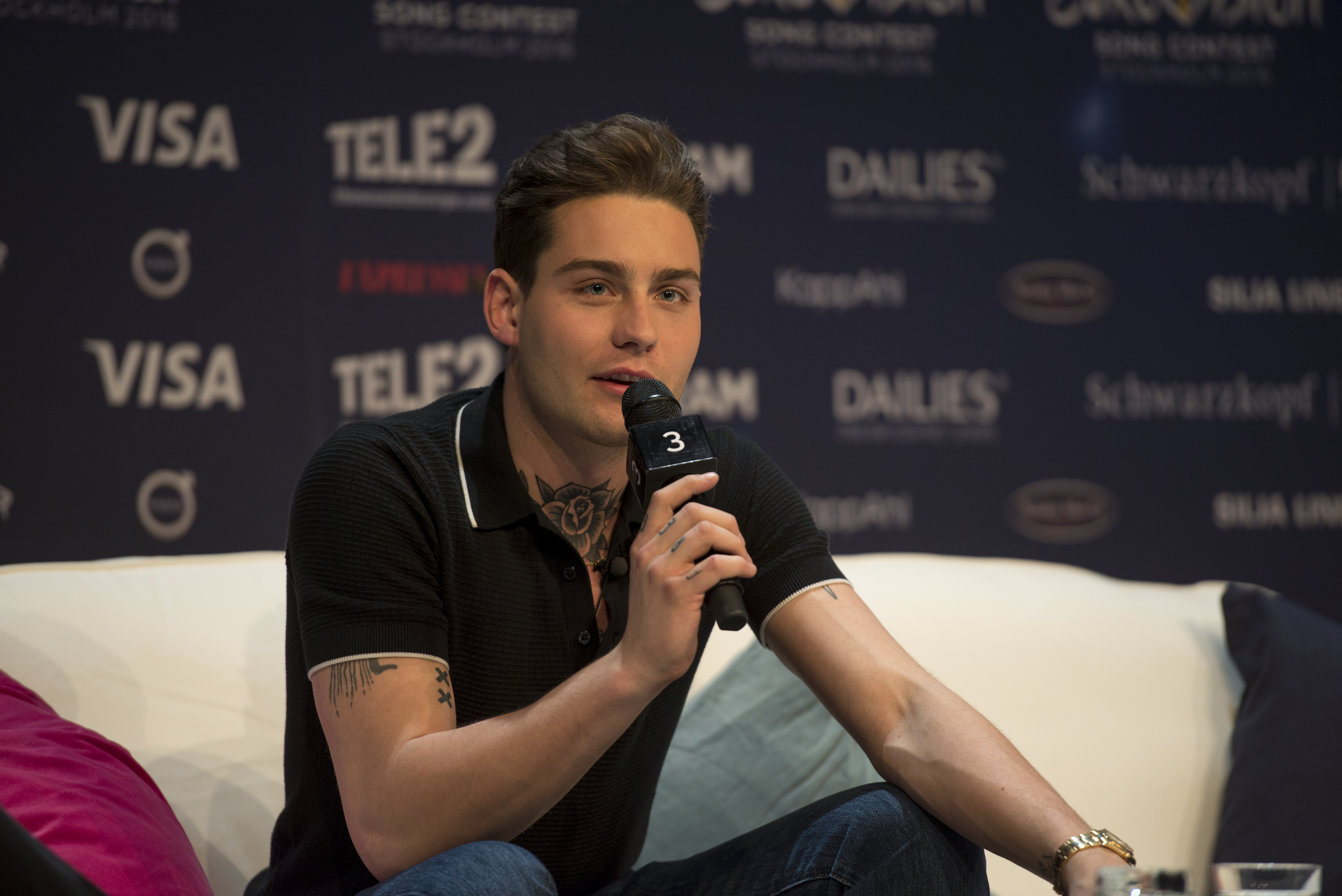
Douwe Bob during a press meet and greet

According to Eurovision rules, all nations with the exceptions of the host country and the "Big Five" (France, Germany, Italy, Spain and the United Kingdom) are required to qualify from one of two semi-finals in order to compete for the final; the top ten countries from each semi-final progress to the final. The European Broadcasting Union (EBU) split up the competing countries into six different pots based on voting patterns from previous contests, with countries with favourable voting histories put into the same pot. On 25 January 2016, a special allocation draw was held which placed each country into one of the two semi-finals, as well as which half of the show they would perform in. The Netherlands was placed into the first semi-final, to be held on 10 May 2016, and was scheduled to perform in the first half of the show.

Once all the competing songs for the 2016 contest had been released, the running order for the semi-finals was decided by the shows' producers rather than through another draw, so that similar songs were not placed next to each other. The Netherlands was set to perform in position 6, following the entry from Croatia and before the entry from Armenia.

The two semi-finals and the final was broadcast in the Netherlands on NPO 1 and BVN with commentary by Cornald Maas and Jan Smit; Douwe Bob was also a commentator for the second semi-final. The Dutch spokesperson, who announced the top 12-point score awarded by the Dutch jury during the final, was 2015 Dutch Eurovision entrant Trijntje Oosterhuis.

=== Semi-final ===
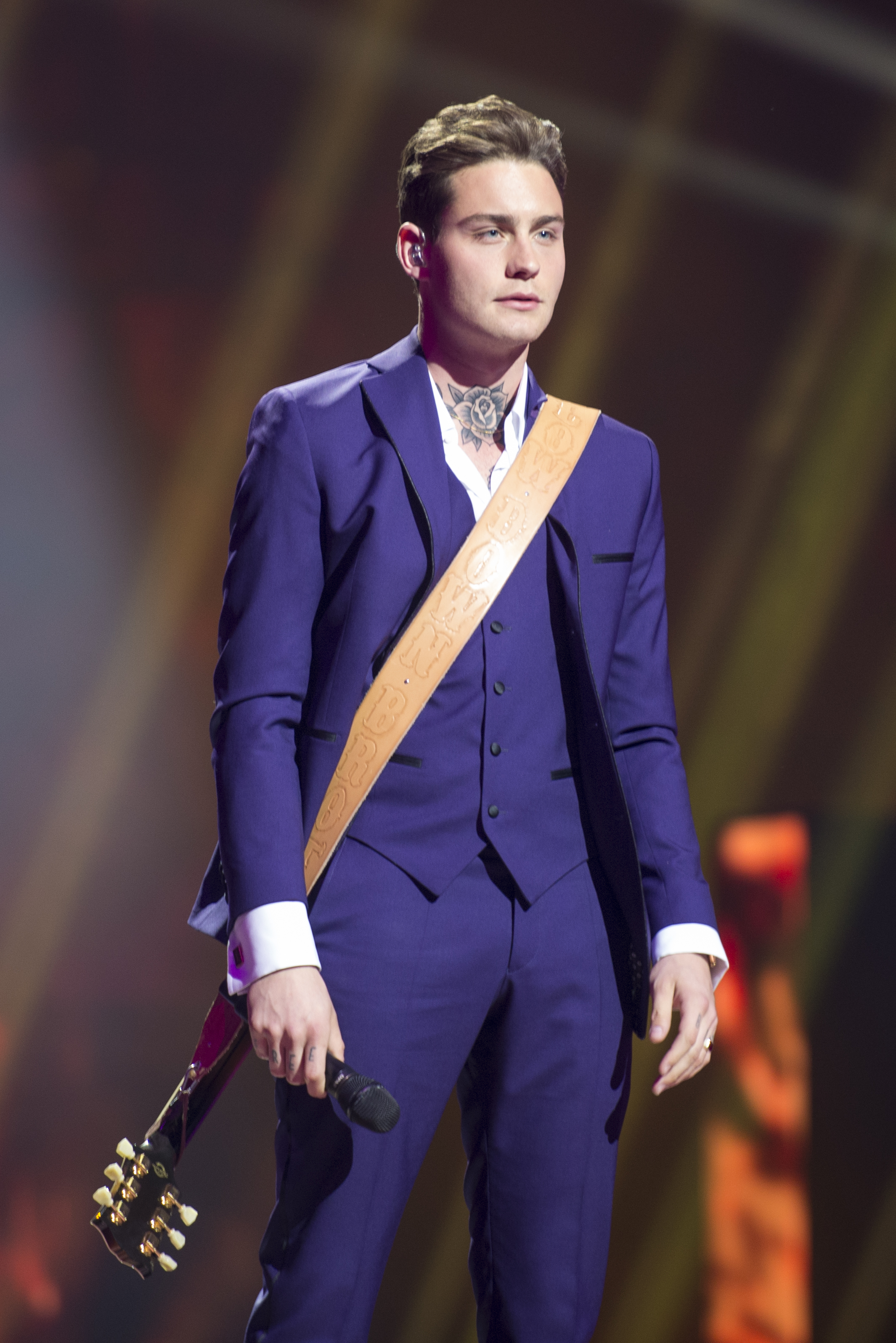
Douwe Bob during a rehearsal before the first semi-final

Douwe Bob took part in technical rehearsals on 2 and 6 May, followed by dress rehearsals on 9 and 10 May. This included the jury show on 9 May where the professional juries of each country watched and voted on the competing entries.

The Dutch performance featured a band set-up with Douwe Bob wearing a blue suit and performing at a microphone stand while playing a guitar. The stage colours were predominately red, orange and purple with the LED screens displaying clocks and turning cogs. Douwe Bob was joined by five band performers/backing vocalists: Jan-Peter Hoekstra, Jeroen Overman, Matthijs van Duijvenbode, Stijn van Dalen and Thijs Boontjes. The staging director for the performance was Hans Pannecoucke, who worked with the Dutch entrants in 2014 and 2015 in a similar role.

At the end of the show, the Netherlands was announced as having finished in the top 10 and subsequently qualifying for the grand final. It was later revealed that the Netherlands placed fifth in the semi-final, receiving a total of 197 points: 95 points from the televoting and 102 points from the juries.

=== Final ===
Shortly after the first semi-final, a winners' press conference was held for the ten qualifying countries. As part of this press conference, the qualifying artists took part in a draw to determine which half of the grand final they would subsequently participate in. This draw was done in the order the countries appeared in the semi-final running order. The Netherlands was drawn to compete in the first half. Following this draw, the shows' producers decided upon the running order of the final, as they had done for the semi-finals. The Netherlands was subsequently placed to perform in position 3, following the entry from Czech Republic and before the entry from Azerbaijan.

Douwe Bob once again took part in dress rehearsals on 13 and 14 May before the final, including the jury final where the professional juries cast their final votes before the live show. Douwe Bob performed a repeat of his semi-final performance during the final on 14 May. The Netherlands placed eleventh in the final, scoring 153 points: 39 points from the televoting and 114 points from the juries.

=== Voting ===
Voting during the three shows was conducted under a new system that involved each country now awarding two sets of points from 1-8, 10 and 12: one from their professional jury and the other from televoting. Each nation's jury consisted of five music industry professionals who are citizens of the country they represent, with their names published before the contest to ensure transparency. This jury judged each entry based on: vocal capacity; the stage performance; the song's composition and originality; and the overall impression by the act. In addition, no member of a national jury was permitted to be related in any way to any of the competing acts in such a way that they cannot vote impartially and independently. The individual rankings of each jury member as well as the nation's televoting results were released shortly after the grand final.

Below is a breakdown of points awarded to the Netherlands and awarded by the Netherlands in the first semi-final and grand final of the contest, and the breakdown of the jury voting and televoting conducted during the two shows:

==== Points awarded to the Netherlands ====
Points awarded to the Netherlands (Semi-final 1)
Score	Televote	Jury
12 points		Estonia; Finland; Iceland; San Marino
10 points	Austria; Iceland; Sweden	Czech Republic
8 points	Estonia	France
7 points	Malta	
6 points	Finland; Hungary; San Marino; Spain	Austria; Hungary; Sweden
5 points	Croatia	
4 points	Armenia; Azerbaijan; Cyprus; France	Armenia; Moldova; Spain
3 points	Czech Republic	
2 points	Greece	Croatia; Montenegro
1 point		Bosnia and Herzegovina; Greece

Points awarded to the Netherlands (Final)
Score	Televote	Jury
12 points		Iceland
10 points	Belgium	Finland
8 points		Ireland
7 points	Denmark	Czech Republic; Denmark; France
6 points	Austria; Iceland	Estonia; Hungary; Norway
5 points		Serbia; Sweden; Switzerland
4 points		Belgium; Germany; Italy; San Marino
3 points	Germany; Malta	Australia; Latvia; Spain
2 points	Hungary; Sweden	Bulgaria; Macedonia
1 point		Slovenia

==== Points awarded by the Netherlands ====
Points awarded by the Netherlands (Semi-final 1)
Score	Televote	Jury
12 points	Armenia	Croatia
10 points	Austria	Cyprus
8 points	Russia	Malta
7 points	Bosnia and Herzegovina	Azerbaijan
6 points	Hungary	Austria
5 points	Croatia	Armenia
4 points	San Marino	Czech Republic
3 points	Cyprus	Hungary
2 points	Czech Republic	Finland
1 point	Malta	Russia

Points awarded by the Netherlands (Final)
Score	Televote	Jury
12 points	Belgium	Australia
10 points	Poland	Sweden
8 points	Armenia	Austria
7 points	Ukraine	Israel
6 points	Austria	Italy
5 points	Australia	France
4 points	France	Belgium
3 points	Russia	Ukraine
2 points	Sweden	Armenia
1 point	Bulgaria	Azerbaijan

==== Detailed voting results ====
The following members comprised the Dutch jury:

- Jennie Willemstijn (Jennie Lena; jury chairperson) – singer
- Ruud de Wild – radio DJ
- Marga Bult (Marcha) – singer, represented the Netherlands in the 1987 contest
- Setske Mostaert – vocal coach, singer
- Holger Schwedt – producer

Detailed voting results from the Netherlands (Semi-final 1)
R/O	Country	Jury							Televote	
R/O	Country	J. Lena	R. de Wild	Marcha	S. Mostaert	H. Schwedt	Rank	Points	Rank	Points
01	Finland	8	4	12	10	4	9	2	15	
02	Greece	17	17	17	16	16	17		13	
03	Moldova	7	12	11	15	15	14		16	
04	Hungary	9	11	8	1	8	8	3	5	6
05	Croatia	1	1	6	4	1	1	12	6	5
06	Netherlands									
07	Armenia	10	5	1	8	9	6	5	1	12
08	San Marino	11	6	16	17	10	13		7	4
09	Russia	14	15	3	7	12	10	1	3	8
10	Czech Republic	6	13	5	5	5	7	4	9	2
11	Cyprus	2	9	4	2	3	2	10	8	3
12	Austria	3	2	10	9	7	5	6	2	10
13	Estonia	13	14	13	6	13	12		14	
14	Azerbaijan	5	3	7	13	2	4	7	12	
15	Montenegro	16	10	14	11	17	15		17	
16	Iceland	12	8	9	12	11	11		11	
17	Bosnia and Herzegovina	15	16	15	14	14	16		4	7
18	Malta	4	7	2	3	6	3	8	10	1

Detailed voting results from the Netherlands (Final)
R/O	Country	Jury							Televote	
R/O	Country	J. Lena	R. de Wild	Marcha	S. Mostaert	H. Schwedt	Rank	Points	Rank	Points
01	Belgium	11	13	2	6	17	7	4	1	12
02	Czech Republic	24	6	12	7	10	11		24	
03	Netherlands									
04	Azerbaijan	12	12	14	15	4	10	1	23	
05	Hungary	23	11	15	10	18	17		13	
06	Italy	7	5	7	14	9	5	6	20	
07	Israel	10	4	5	4	16	4	7	18	
08	Bulgaria	22	7	19	23	7	18		10	1
09	Sweden	5	2	9	1	1	2	10	9	2
10	Germany	8	14	20	25	12	19		19	
11	France	17	8	6	11	6	6	5	7	4
12	Poland	16	25	24	21	25	25		2	10
13	Australia	1	3	1	2	3	1	12	6	5
14	Cyprus	13	23	21	5	14	16		15	
15	Serbia	15	16	16	17	24	20		21	
16	Lithuania	21	21	23	8	21	22		12	
17	Croatia	3	24	10	18	5	12		25	
18	Russia	20	15	8	3	19	13		8	3
19	Spain	9	9	17	20	13	14		11	
20	Latvia	2	17	22	19	15	15		17	
21	Ukraine	4	22	11	12	2	8	3	4	7
22	Malta	14	20	13	22	20	21		22	
23	Georgia	19	19	25	16	23	23		16	
24	Austria	6	1	3	13	8	3	8	5	6
25	United Kingdom	25	18	18	24	22	24		14	
26	Armenia	18	10	4	9	11	9	2	3	8
