= Samra Rahimli =

Azerbaijani singer (born 1994)

Samra Rahimli Səmra Rəhimli
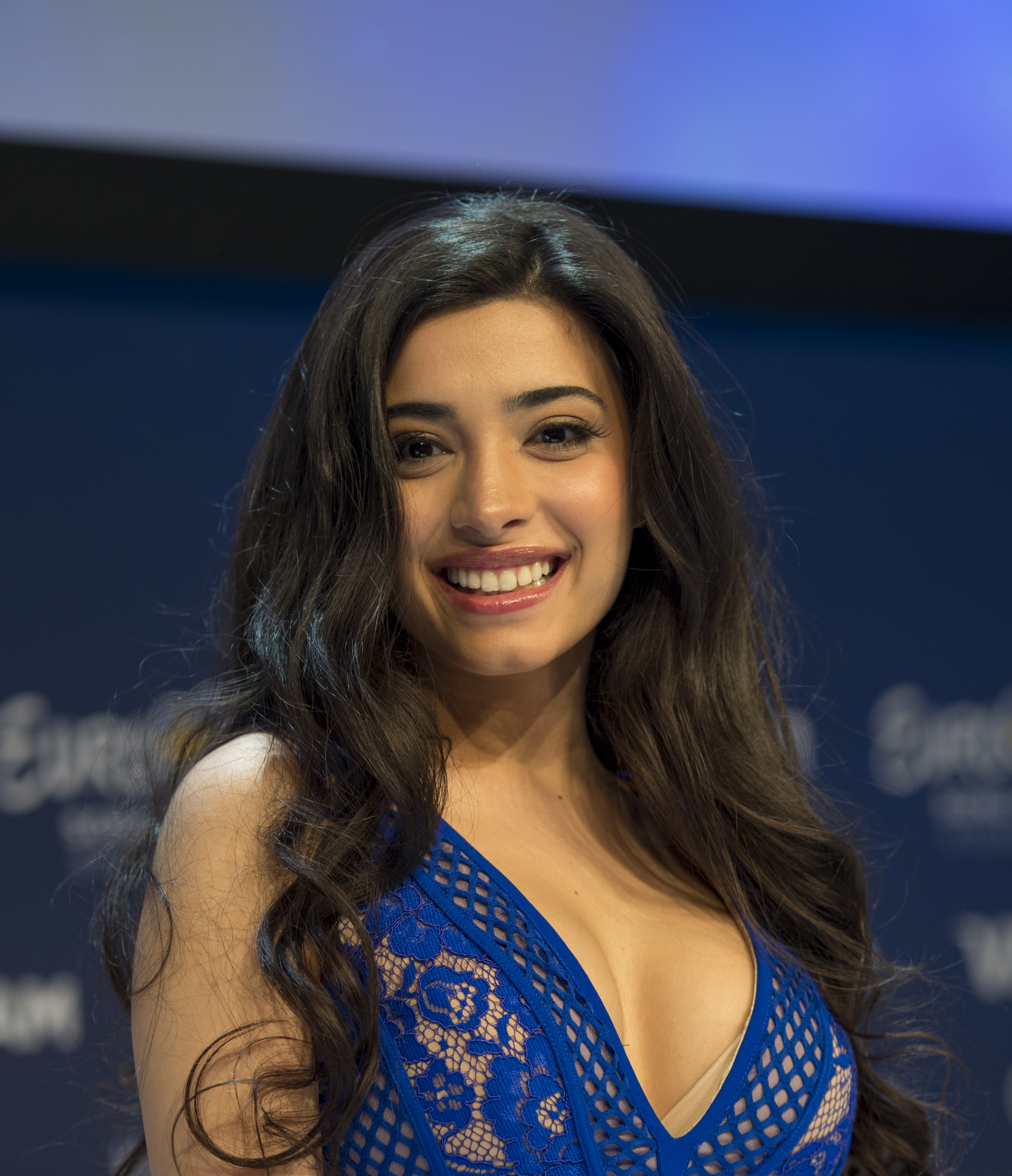
- Rahimli in 2016

Background information
- Also known as: Samra
- Born: 20 October 1994 (age 31); Baku, Azerbaijan
- Genres: Hip hop; R&B; pop
- Occupations: Singer; rapper
- Instrument: Vocals
- Years active: 2015–present

Samra Rahimli (Azerbaijani: Səmra Rəhimli, born 20 October 1994) is an Azerbaijani singer and rapper. In 2015, she competed in O Ses Türkiye (The Voice of Turkey) where she made it to the quarterfinals and in March 2016, she became a finalist on the first season of Səs Azərbaycan (The Voice of Azerbaijan). On 10 March 2016, she was announced as the Azerbaijani act for the Eurovision Song Contest 2016 with the song "Miracle". Rahimli performed during Semi Final 1 and successfully progressed to the Grand Final where she placed 17th with 117 points.

On 22 June 2017, Rahimli released her comeback single "Badminton" with an accompanied music video.

On 1 December 2020, she released a song titled Shusha, we are back (Azerbaijani: Şuşa, biz qayıtmışıq), in relation to the Azerbaijani Armed Forces taking back the control of Shusha, during the 2020 Nagorno-Karabakh war.

In February 2024, Rahimli released her first English language song in four years "Tamagotchi", with "I Need A Man" being released the following month.

== Discography ==
=== Albums ===
- 2021: Göz

=== Singles ===
Year	Title	Album
2015	"O Sevir"	Non-album single
2016	"Miracle"	Non-album single
2017	"Badminton"	Non-album single
2018	"Ters Gedir"	Non-album single
2018	"Hypnotized"	Non-album single
2018	"Пиджак" (Pidzhak)	Non-album single
2019	"Armas"	Non-album single
2020	"Queen"	Non-album single
2020	"Online"	Göz
2020	"Şuşa, Biz Qayıtmışıq"	Non-album single
2021	"Biri Yox, Biri Var"	Göz
2021	"Göz"	Göz

Awards and achievements
Preceded by Elnur Hüseynov with "Hour of the Wolf"	Azerbaijan in the Eurovision Song Contest; 2016	Succeeded by Dihaj with "Skeletons"
