= Russia in the Eurovision Song Contest 2016 =

- Eurovision Song Contest 2016
- Country: Russia
- Selection process: Internal selection
- Announcement date: Artist: 10 December 2015; Song: 5 March 2016

Competing entry
- Song: "You Are The Only One"
- Artist: Sergey Lazarev
- Songwriters: Philipp Kirkorov; Dimitris Kontopoulos; John Ballard; Ralph Charlie

Placement
- Semi-final result: Qualified (1st, 342 points)
- Final result: 3rd, 491 points

Participation chronology

Russia was represented at the Eurovision Song Contest 2016 with the song "You Are the Only One" written by Philipp Kirkorov, Dimitris Kontopoulos, John Ballard and Ralph Charlie. The song was performed by Sergey Lazarev who was internally selected by the Russian broadcaster All-Russia State Television and Radio Broadcasting Company (VGTRK) to compete at the 2016 contest in Stockholm, Sweden. Lazarev's appointment as the Russian representative was announced on 10 December 2015, while the song, "You Are the Only One", was presented to the public on 5 March 2016.

Russia was drawn to compete in the first semi-final of the Eurovision Song Contest which took place on 10 May 2016. Performing during the show in position nine, "You Are the Only One" was announced among the top 10 entries of the first semi-final and therefore qualified to compete in the final on 14 May. It was later revealed that Russia placed first out of the 18 participating countries in the semi-final with 342 points. In the final, Russia performed in position 18 and placed third out of the 26 participating countries, scoring 491 points.

== Background ==
Prior to the 2016 contest, Russia had participated in the Eurovision Song Contest nineteen times since its first entry in 1994. Russia had won the contest on one occasion in 2008 with the song "Believe" performed by Dima Bilan. Russia's least successful result has been 17th place, which they have achieved in the 1995 with the song "Kolybelnaya dlya vulkana" performed by Philipp Kirkorov. Following the introduction of semi-finals for the 2004, Russia has, to this point, managed to qualify to the final on every occasion. In 2015, Russia was the runner-up at the Eurovision Song Contest, placing second with the song "A Million Voices" performed by Polina Gagarina.

For the 2016 Contest, the Russian national broadcaster, All-Russia State Television and Radio Broadcasting Company (VGTRK), broadcast the event within Russia and organised the selection process for the nation's entry. Since 2008, the Russian participation in the contest alternates between two broadcasters: Channel One Russia and VGTRK. VGTRK confirmed their intention to participate at the 2016 Eurovision Song Contest on 30 September 2015. Russia has used various methods to select the Russian entry in the past, including national finals and internal selections. Since 2013, both Russian broadcasters have been selecting the Russian entry through an internal selection, a method that was continued for their 2016 participation.

== Before Eurovision ==
=== Internal selection ===
On 10 December 2015, VGTRK announced that they had internally selected Sergey Lazarev to represent Russia in Stockholm. The announcement occurred during the First Russian National Music Awards, where Sergey Lazarev was named "Singer of the Year". Lazarev's selection as the Russian representative was decided upon by the editorial board of VGTRK with the executive entertainment producer of the Russia-1 channel, Gennady Gokhshtein, revealing that a song produced by Philipp Kirkorov had also been selected. Lazarev previously attempted to represent Russia at the Eurovision Song Contest in 2003 and 2004 as a member of duo Smash and in 2007, 2008 and 2015 as a solo act. Russian media later reported that Lazarev would work with Kirkorov and Dimitris Kontopoulos in order to create his contest song, while choreographer Fokas Evangelinos was selected to develop the stage presentation for the entry. Kirkorov previously represented Russia in 1995 as well as composed the 2007 Belarusian entry, the 2008 Ukrainian entry and the 2014 Russian entry, while Kontopoulos had previously collaborated with Kirkorov on all of his composing efforts in addition to composing the 2009 Greek entry and the 2013 Azerbaijani entry.

The Russian song, "You Are the Only One", was presented to the public on 5 March 2016 through the release of the official music video on YouTube. The music video, directed by Konstantin Cherepkov, features Miss Universe Russia 2015 Vladislava Evtushenko. "You Are the Only One" was composed by Philipp Kirkorov and Dimitris Kontopoulos, with lyrics by John Ballard and Ralph Charlie; Ballard and Charlie previously co-wrote the lyrics for the 2013 Azerbaijani entry and the 2014 Russian entry. The song was also presented on the same day during the Russia-1 evening news programme Vesti v Subbotu.

Song selection
Songwriter(s)	Song	Place
Konstantin Meladze	Unknown	3/4
Maxim Fadeev	Unknown	3/4
Philipp Kirkorov and Dimitris Kontopoulos	"You Are the Only One"	1
Vladimir Matetsky	Unknown	2

=== Promotion ===
In the months prior to his performance in the Eurovision Song Contest, Sergey Lazarev took part in a concert tour of Russia where he performed "You Are the Only One" for the first time during his concert in Kursk on 20 March 2016. A performance of the song was also presented to the Russian audience for the first time during the Russia-1 programme Tantsi so zvezdami on 27 March. On 3 April, Lazarev performed during the Eurovision Pre-Party, which was held at the Izvestia Hall in Moscow and hosted by Dmitry Guberniev.

Sergey Lazarev also made several appearances across Europe to specifically promote "You Are the Only One" as the Russian Eurovision entry. Between 11 and 13 April, Lazarev took part in promotional activities in Tel Aviv, Israel and performed during the Israel Calling event held at the Ha'teatron venue. Between 13 and 14 April, Lazarev took part in promotional activities and provided interviews in Malta. On 17 April, Lazarev completed promotional activities in Belgrade, Serbia and recorded a performance for the talk show programme Veče sa Ivanom Ivanovićem, which aired on Prva Srpska Televizija on 18 April. On 18 April, Sergey Lazarev made promotional appearances in Athens, Greece where he attended a meet and greet during a party organized by the Oikotimes website and he performed during the MAD TV Madwalk 2016 music and fashion show, which was hosted by Despina Vandi.

== At Eurovision ==
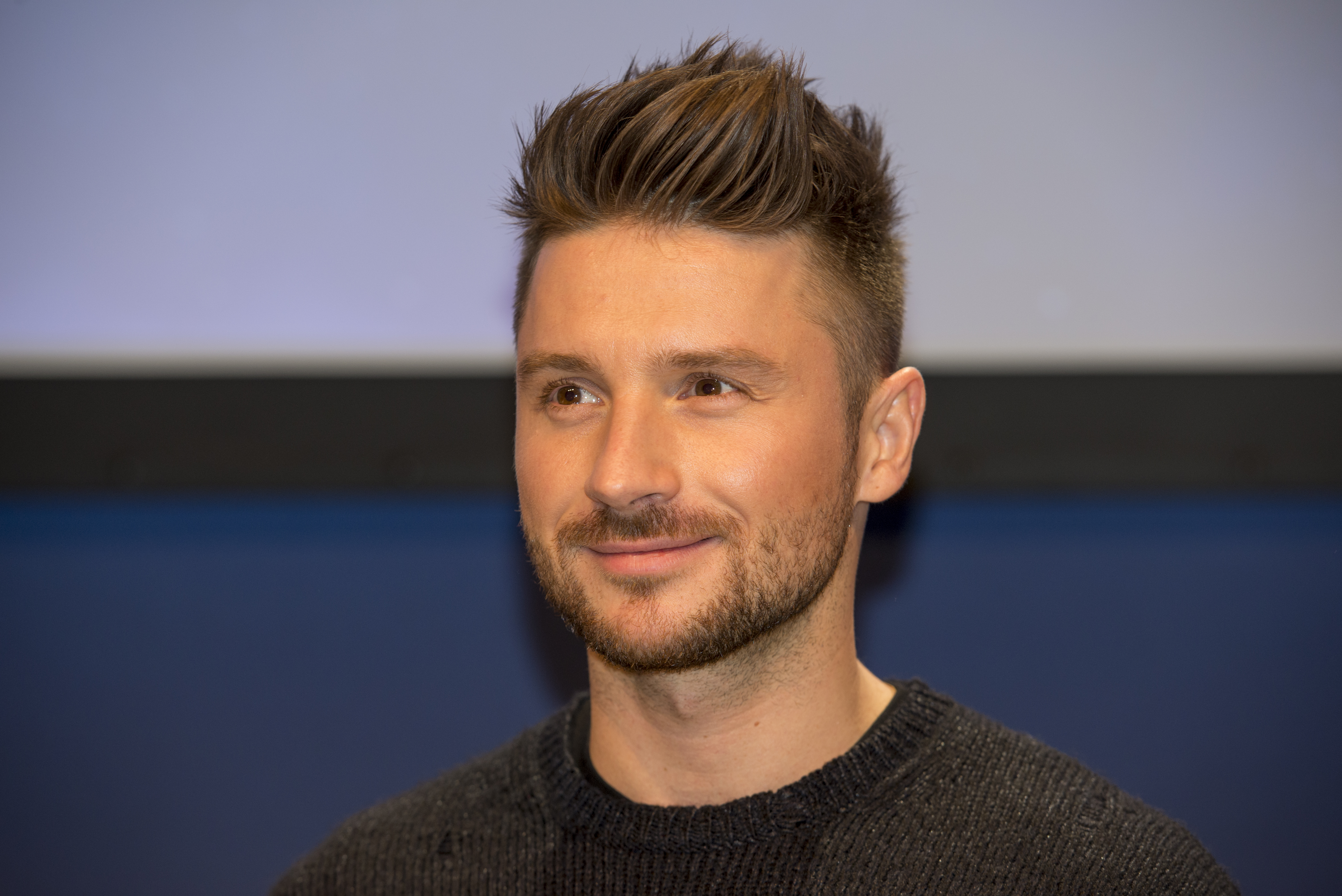
Sergey Lazarev during a press meet and greet

According to Eurovision rules, all nations with the exceptions of the host country and the "Big Five" (France, Germany, Italy, Spain and the United Kingdom) are required to qualify from one of two semi-finals in order to compete for the final; the top ten countries from each semi-final progress to the final. The European Broadcasting Union (EBU) split up the competing countries into six different pots based on voting patterns from previous contests, with countries with favourable voting histories put into the same pot. On 25 January 2016, a special allocation draw was held which placed each country into one of the two semi-finals, as well as which half of the show they would perform in. Russia was placed into the first semi-final, to be held on 10 May 2016, and was scheduled to perform in the first half of the show.

Once all the competing songs for the 2016 contest had been released, the running order for the semi-finals was decided by the shows' producers rather than through another draw, so that similar songs were not placed next to each other. Russia was set to perform in position 9, following the entry from San Marino and before the entry from the Czech Republic.

The two semi-finals and the final were broadcast in Russia on Russia-1 and Russia HD with commentary by Dmitry Guberniev and Ernest Mackevičius. The Russian spokesperson, who announced the top 12-point score awarded by the Russian jury during the final, was Nyusha.

=== Semi-final ===
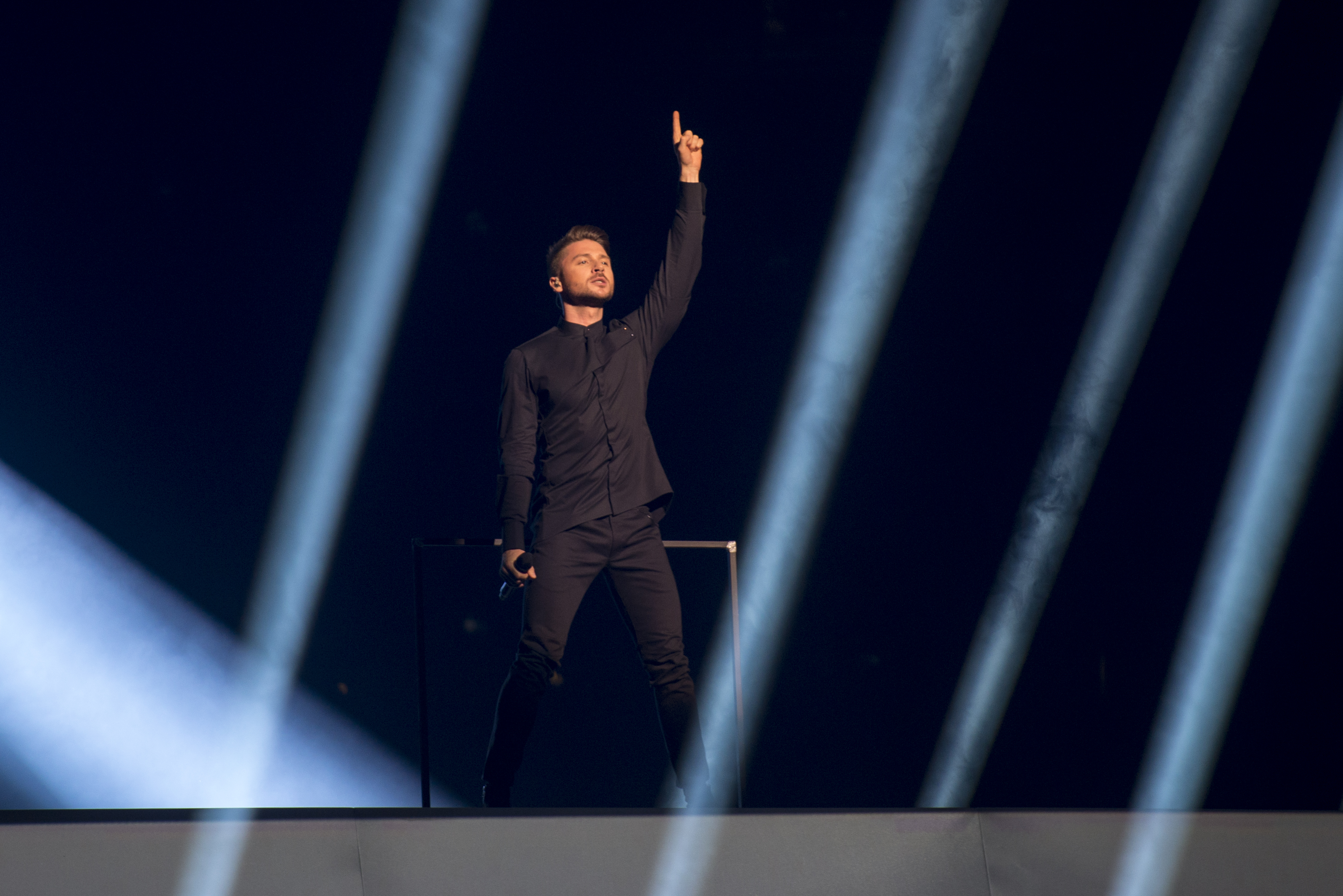
Sergey Lazarev during a rehearsal before the first semi-final

Sergey Lazarev took part in technical rehearsals on 2 and 6 May, followed by dress rehearsals on 9 and 10 May. This included the jury show on 9 May where the professional juries of each country watched and voted on the competing entries.

The Russian performance featured Sergey Lazarev performing in front of a projection screen that displayed 3D images that Lazarev interacted with. Lazarev posed, climbed and laid in the middle of the projection screen as various effects were projected. Lazarev was dressed in a black costume and performed choreographed movements together with the backing performers, who were also dressed in black. The stage director for the performance was Fokas Evangelinos. On stage, Lazarev was joined by five backing vocalists/dancers: Jennie Jahns, Alvaro Estrella, Johan D. Seil, Daniel Gill and Adam Svensson.

At the end of the show, Russia was announced as having finished in the top 10 and subsequently qualifying for the grand final. It was later revealed that Russia placed first in the semi-final, receiving a total of 342 points: 194 points from the televoting and 148 points from the juries.

=== Final ===
Shortly after the first semi-final, a winners' press conference was held for the ten qualifying countries. As part of this press conference, the qualifying artists took part in a draw to determine which half of the grand final they would subsequently participate in. This draw was done in the order the countries appeared in the semi-final running order. Russia was drawn to compete in the second half. Following this draw, the shows' producers decided upon the running order of the final, as they had done for the semi-finals. Russia was subsequently placed to perform in position 18, following the entry from Croatia and before the entry from Spain.

Sergey Lazarev once again took part in dress rehearsals on 13 and 14 May before the final, including the jury final where the professional juries cast their final votes before the live show. Sergey Lazarev performed a repeat of his semi-final performance during the final on 14 May. Russia placed third in the final, scoring 491 points: 361 points from the televoting and 130 points from the juries.

==== Marcel Bezençon Awards ====
The Marcel Bezençon Awards, first awarded during the 2002 contest, are awards honouring the best competing songs in the final each year. Named after the creator of the annual contest, Marcel Bezençon, the awards are divided into 3 categories: the Press Award, given to the best entry as voted on by the accredited media and press during the event; the Artistic Award, presented to the best artist as voted on by the shows' commentators; and the Composer Award, given to the best and most original composition as voted by the participating composers. "You Are the Only One" was awarded the Press Award, which was accepted at the awards ceremony by Sergey Lazarev.

=== Voting ===
Voting during the three shows was conducted under a new system that involved each country now awarding two sets of points from 1-8, 10 and 12: one from their professional jury and the other from televoting. Each nation's jury consisted of five music industry professionals who are citizens of the country they represent, with their names published before the contest to ensure transparency. This jury judged each entry based on: vocal capacity; the stage performance; the song's composition and originality; and the overall impression by the act. In addition, no member of a national jury was permitted to be related in any way to any of the competing acts in such a way that they cannot vote impartially and independently. The individual rankings of each jury member as well as the nation's televoting results were released shortly after the grand final.

Below is a breakdown of points awarded to Russia and awarded by Russia in the first semi-final and grand final of the contest, and the breakdown of the jury voting and televoting conducted during the two shows:

==== Points awarded to Russia ====
Points awarded to Russia (Semi-final 1)
Score	Televote	Jury
12 points	Armenia; Azerbaijan; Estonia; Iceland; Malta; San Marino	Azerbaijan; Cyprus; Greece; Moldova; Sweden
10 points	Croatia; Cyprus; Greece; Hungary; Moldova; Montenegro	Hungary; Iceland; Malta
8 points	Czech Republic; Finland; France; Netherlands; Spain; Sweden	Austria; Bosnia and Herzegovina; Montenegro; Spain
7 points	Austria; Bosnia and Herzegovina	Armenia
6 points		Croatia; Finland
5 points		
4 points		
3 points		San Marino
2 points		France
1 point		Estonia; Netherlands

Points awarded to Russia (Final)
Score	Televote	Jury
12 points	Armenia; Azerbaijan; Belarus; Bulgaria; Estonia; Germany; Latvia; Moldova; Serbia; Ukraine	Azerbaijan; Belarus; Cyprus; Greece
10 points	Cyprus; Czech Republic; Greece; Hungary; Israel; Malta; Montenegro; San Marino; Slovenia	
8 points	Austria; Croatia; Finland; Georgia; Ireland; Italy; Lithuania; Macedonia; Poland; Spain; Sweden	Iceland; Montenegro
7 points	Albania; Iceland; United Kingdom	Albania; Latvia; Moldova; San Marino
6 points	Belgium; Bosnia and Herzegovina; France; Norway; Switzerland	Bulgaria; Croatia; Sweden
5 points	Australia	Bosnia and Herzegovina
4 points	Denmark	Malta; Spain
3 points	Netherlands	Austria
2 points		Armenia
1 point		France; Serbia

==== Points awarded by Russia ====
Points awarded by Russia (Semi-final 1)
Score	Televote	Jury
12 points	Armenia	Armenia
10 points	Austria	Azerbaijan
8 points	Cyprus	Malta
7 points	Azerbaijan	Greece
6 points	Hungary	Moldova
5 points	Moldova	Czech Republic
4 points	Croatia	Hungary
3 points	Greece	Montenegro
2 points	Malta	Estonia
1 point	Czech Republic	Croatia

Points awarded by Russia (Final)
Score	Televote	Jury
12 points	Armenia	Armenia
10 points	Ukraine	Azerbaijan
8 points	Austria	Malta
7 points	Cyprus	France
6 points	Azerbaijan	United Kingdom
5 points	Poland	Georgia
4 points	Australia	Cyprus
3 points	France	Latvia
2 points	Sweden	Australia
1 point	Latvia	Hungary

==== Detailed voting results ====
The following members comprised the Russian jury:

- Larisa Rubalskaya (jury chairperson) – poet, translator, writer
- Denis Maidanov – singer, composer, musical producer
- Lipa Teterich – television host
- Oskar Kuchera – actor, musician, television and radio host
- Anastasia Stotskaya – singer (jury member in semi-final 1; votes declared invalid)
- Stanislav Duzhnikov – actor (jury member in the final)

The EBU announced on 10 May 2016 that they were investigating reports of possible rule violations after Russian professional jury member Anastasia Stotskaya livestreamed footage through the live-streaming social media site Periscope, showing the Russian jury's deliberation during the jury rehearsal of the first semi-final on 9 May. The video showed a jury member not paying attention to the Dutch performance, as well as a glimpse of Stotskaya's jury voting form showing notes evaluating performances. Another jury member states during the Armenian performance that she will support Armenia "because [her] husband is Armenian". The rules of the contest stipulate that all jury members are to evaluate performances individually, without discussing the results with other jury members. Prior to the live broadcast of the first semi-final, the EBU announced that after discussing the matter with the Russian broadcaster, Stotskaya would be withdrawn as a jury member and her votes would be declared invalid. The Russian broadcaster named actor Stanislav Duzhnikov as a replacement juror prior to the jury final on 13 May.

Detailed voting results from Russia (Semi-final 1)
R/O	Country	Jury						Televote	
R/O	Country	L. Rubalskaya	O. Kuchera	D. Maidanov	L. Teterich	Rank	Points	Rank	Points
01	Finland	17	17	17	13	17		17	
02	Greece	4	7	5	5	4	7	8	3
03	Moldova	9	8	8	4	5	6	6	5
04	Hungary	13	9	9	2	7	4	5	6
05	Croatia	3	16	13	8	10	1	7	4
06	Netherlands	7	13	7	14	11		11	
07	Armenia	2	1	1	3	1	12	1	12
08	San Marino	11	15	15	16	16		13	
09	Russia								
10	Czech Republic	14	3	4	9	6	5	10	1
11	Cyprus	16	10	11	10	13		3	8
12	Austria	6	14	14	11	12		2	10
13	Estonia	8	4	10	17	9	2	12	
14	Azerbaijan	1	5	3	1	2	10	4	7
15	Montenegro	15	6	6	7	8	3	16	
16	Iceland	12	11	12	12	14		14	
17	Bosnia and Herzegovina	10	12	16	15	15		15	
18	Malta	5	2	2	6	3	8	9	2

Detailed voting results from Russia (Final)
R/O	Country	Jury							Televote	
R/O	Country	L. Rubalskaya	S. Duzhnikov	O. Kuchera	D. Maidanov	L. Teterich	Rank	Points	Rank	Points
01	Belgium	22	23	22	4	13	20		22	
02	Czech Republic	18	22	5	13	14	14		23	
03	Netherlands	8	5	24	18	15	12		20	
04	Azerbaijan	2	2	3	3	1	2	10	5	6
05	Hungary	12	15	12	19	2	10	1	12	
06	Italy	20	8	13	8	12	11		14	
07	Israel	23	24	25	24	22	25		17	
08	Bulgaria	13	16	15	21	19	21		11	
09	Sweden	14	17	7	14	20	15		9	2
10	Germany	15	13	14	15	21	18		21	
11	France	5	9	4	10	6	4	7	8	3
12	Poland	10	25	23	25	24	23		6	5
13	Australia	24	6	10	9	8	9	2	7	4
14	Cyprus	4	7	11	12	10	7	4	4	7
15	Serbia	19	21	20	20	23	22		16	
16	Lithuania	11	3	19	22	16	13		18	
17	Croatia	17	18	18	11	11	16		24	
18	Russia									
19	Spain	16	19	6	17	18	17		15	
20	Latvia	7	20	9	5	5	8	3	10	1
21	Ukraine	25	14	21	23	25	24		2	10
22	Malta	1	12	2	2	4	3	8	19	
23	Georgia	9	4	16	7	7	6	5	13	
24	Austria	21	11	17	16	17	19		3	8
25	United Kingdom	6	10	8	6	9	5	6	25	
26	Armenia	3	1	1	1	3	1	12	1	12
