= Estonia in the Eurovision Song Contest 2016 =

- Eurovision Song Contest 2016
- Participating broadcaster: Eesti Rahvusringhääling (ERR)
- Country: Estonia
- Selection process: Eesti Laul 2016
- Selection date: 5 March 2016

Competing entry
- Song: "Play"
- Artist: Jüri Pootsmann
- Songwriters: Fred Krieger; Stig Rästa; Vallo Kikas

Placement
- Semi-final result: Failed to qualify (18th)

Participation chronology

Estonia was represented at the Eurovision Song Contest 2016 with the song "Play" written by Fred Krieger, Stig Rästa and Vallo Kikas. The song was performed by Jüri Pootsmann. The Estonian broadcaster Eesti Rahvusringhääling (ERR) organised the national final Eesti Laul 2016 in order to select the Estonian entry for the 2016 contest in Stockholm, Sweden. The national final consisted of three shows: two semi-finals and a final. Ten songs competed in each semi-final and the top five from each semi-final as determined by a jury panel and public vote qualified to the final. In the final, the winner was selected over two rounds of voting. In the first round, a jury panel and a public vote selected the top three to qualify to the superfinal. In the superfinal, "Play" performed by Jüri Pootsmann was selected as the winner entirely by a public vote.

Estonia was drawn to compete in the first semi-final of the Eurovision Song Contest which took place on 10 May 2016. Performing during the show in position 13, "Play" was not announced among the top 10 entries of the first semi-final and therefore did not qualify to compete in the final. It was later revealed that Estonia placed eighteenth (last) out of the 18 participating countries in the semi-final with 24 points.

== Background ==
Prior to the 2016 contest, Estonia had participated in the Eurovision Song Contest twenty-one times since its first entry in 1994, winning the contest on one occasion in 2001 with the song "Everybody" performed by Tanel Padar, Dave Benton and 2XL. Following the introduction of semi-finals for the 2004, Estonia has, to this point, managed to qualify to the final on five occasions. In 2015, "Goodbye to Yesterday" performed by Elina Born and Stig Rästa managed to qualify Estonia to the final where the song placed seventh.

The Estonian national broadcaster, Eesti Rahvusringhääling (ERR), broadcasts the event within Estonia and organises the selection process for the nation's entry. ERR confirmed Estonia's participation at the 2016 Eurovision Song Contest on 27 May 2015. Since their debut, the Estonian broadcaster has organised national finals that feature a competition among multiple artists and songs in order to select Estonia's entry for the Eurovision Song Contest. The Eesti Laul competition has been organised since 2009 in order to select Estonia's entry and on 10 September 2015, ERR announced the organisation of Eesti Laul 2016 in order to select the nation's 2016 entry.

== Before Eurovision ==
=== Eesti Laul 2016 ===
Eesti Laul 2016 was the eighth edition of the Estonian national selection Eesti Laul, which selected Estonia's entry for the Eurovision Song Contest 2016. The competition consisted of twenty entries competing in two semi-finals on 13 and 20 February 2016 leading to a ten-song final on 5 March 2016. All three shows were broadcast on Eesti Televisioon (ETV) as well as streamed online at the broadcaster's official website err.ee. The final was also broadcast via radio on Raadio 2 with commentary by Erik Morna, Margus Kamlat and Helle Rudi as well as streamed online at the official Eurovision Song Contest website eurovision.tv. For the first time in the history of the competition, both the semi-finals and the final also aired on ETV+ with Russian commentary by Aleksandr Hobotov for all three shows, Kira Evve for the semi-finals and Sofia Rubina for the final.

==== Format ====
The format of the competition included two semi-finals on 13 and 20 February 2016 and a final on 5 March 2016. Ten songs competed in each semi-final and the top five from each semi-final qualified to complete the ten song lineup in the final. The results of the semi-finals was determined by the 50/50 combination of votes from a professional jury and public televoting. The winning song in the final was selected over two rounds of voting: the first round results selected the top three songs via the 50/50 combination of jury and public voting, while the second round (superfinal) determined the winner solely by public televoting. In addition to winning the right to represent Estonia at the 2016 Eurovision Song Contest, the winner was also awarded a monetary prize of €3,000. The Estonian Authors' Society and Estonian Performers Association also awarded monetary prizes to the top three entries: the winner received €1,500 and both second and third placed entries each received €500.

==== Competing entries ====
On 10 September 2015, ERR opened the submission period for artists and composers to submit their entries up until 2 November 2015. All artists and composers were required to have Estonian citizenship or be a permanent resident of Estonia and each artist and songwriter was only able to submit a maximum of three entries. A record 238 submissions were received by the deadline—breaking the previous record of 219, set during the 2015 edition. An 11-member jury panel selected 20 semi-finalists from the submissions and the selected songs were announced during the ETV entertainment program Ringvaade and the ETV+ Russian language programme Tvoi vecher on 5 November 2015. The selection jury consisted of Erik Morna (Raadio 2 head of music), Toomas Puna (Raadio Sky+ program director), Owe Petersell (Raadio Elmar chief editor), Siim Nestor (music critic), Valner Valme (music critic), Anne Veski (singer), Ingrid Kohtla (Tallinn Music Week organiser), Olavi Paide (producer), Eeva Talsi (musician), Eisi Mäeots (DJ) and Kira Evve (Raadio 4 editor).

Among the competing artists were previous Eurovision Song Contest entrants Laura, who represented Estonia in 2005 as part of the group Suntribe, and Mick Pedaja, who represented Estonia as member of Manpower 4 in 2010 together with Malcolm Lincoln. Anett Kulbin, Grete Paia, Meisterjaan, Põhja-Tallinn, Tuuli Rand (Windy Beach), Rosanna Lints (lead singer of Würffel) and Noorkuu have all competed in previous editions of Eesti Laul. Jüri Pootsmann's entry was written by Stig Rästa, who represented Estonia in 2015 with Elina Born, and the entry from La La Ladies was co-written by Tanja, who represented Estonia in 2014.

| Artist | Song | Songwriter(s) |
|---|---|---|
| Anett Kulbin | "Strong" | Anett Kulbin, Joonas Mattias Sarapuu |
| Cartoon and Kristel Aaslaid | "Immortality" | Ago Teppand, Hugo Martin Maasikas, Joosep Järvesaar, Kerli Kõiv, Iiris Vesik, Kristel Aaslaid |
| Gertu Pabbo | "Miljon korda" | Lii Schmidt, Priit Pajusaar, Maian Kärmas |
| Go Away Bird | "Sally" | Stanislav Bulganin |
| Grete Paia | "Stories Untold" | Sven Lõhmus |
| I Wear* Experiment | "Patience" | Hando Jaksi, Mikk Simson, Johanna Eenmaa |
| Indrek Ventmann | "Hispaania tüdruk" | Allan Kasuk |
| The Jingles | "Love a Little Bit" | Jonathan Flack, Hain Hoppe, Rauno Vaher, Tanel Liiberg |
| Jüri Pootsmann | "Play" | Fred Krieger, Stig Rästa, Vallo Kikas |
| Kati Laev and Noorkuu | "Kaugel sinust" | Urmas Kõiv, Anneli Kõiv |
| Kéa | "Lonely Boy" | Egert Milder, Robert Stanley Montes, Ian Karell |
| La La Ladies | "Unikaalne" | Tatjana Mihhailova, Mihkel Mattisen, Timo Vendt, Inga Tislar |
| Laura | "Supersonic" | Sven Lõhmus |
| Meisterjaan | "Parmupillihullus" | Jaan Tätte Juunior |
| Mick Pedaja | "Seis" | Mick Pedaja |
| Põhja-Tallinn and Jaagup Kreem | "Ei ole mul olla" | Jaanus Saks, Kristjan Soomre, Mark Eric Kammiste, Hannes Agur Vellend, Herlend-Kaspar Raudkivi |
| Púr Múdd | "Meet Halfway" | Oliver Rõõmus, Joonas Alvre |
| Windy Beach | "Salty Wounds" | Priit Uustulnd, Tuuli Rand, Mari Tamm |
| Würffel | "I'm Facing North" | Kaspar Kalluste, Rosanna Lints |
| Zebra Island | "How Many Times" | Rasmus Lill, Helina Risti |

==== Semi-finals ====
The two semi-finals took place on 13 and 20 February 2016, hosted by Henry Kõrvits and Maris Kõrvits. The live portion of the shows were held at the Estonia Theatre in Tallinn where the artists awaited the results while their performances, which were filmed earlier at the ERR studios between 5 and 7 February 2016, were screened. In each semi-final ten songs competed for five spots in the final with the outcome decided upon by the combination of the votes from a jury panel and a public televote which registered 17,012 votes in the first semi-final and 21,831 votes in the second semi-final. The jury panel that voted in the semi-finals consisted of Owe Petersell, Luisa Värk, Mihkel Raud, Sten Teppan, Ivo Kiviorg, Reet Linna, Ruslan PX, Epp Kõiv, Janar Ala, Maarja Merivoo-Parro and Sven Grünberg.

Semi-final 1 – 13 February 2016
| R/O | Artist | Song | Jury | | Televote | | Total | Place |
| R/O | Artist | Song | Votes | Points | Votes | Points | Total | Place |
|---|---|---|---|---|---|---|---|---|
| 1 | The Jingles | "Love a Little Bit" | 26 | 1 | 545 | 2 | 3 | 10 |
| 2 | Würffel | "I'm Facing North" | 96 | 10 | 415 | 1 | 11 | 6 |
| 3 | Mick Pedaja | "Seis" | 102 | 12 | 1,822 | 6 | 18 | 2 |
| 4 | Indrek Ventmann | "Hispaania tüdruk" | 40 | 3 | 1,967 | 7 | 10 | 7 |
| 5 | Cartoon feat. Kristel Aaslaid | "Immortality" | 92 | 8 | 3,171 | 8 | 16 | 3 |
| 6 | Kéa | "Lonely Boy" | 62 | 6 | 721 | 5 | 11 | 5 |
| 7 | Kati Laev and Noorkuu | "Kaugel sinust" | 39 | 2 | 3,214 | 10 | 12 | 4 |
| 8 | Zebra Island | "How Many Times" | 61 | 5 | 643 | 4 | 9 | 8 |
| 9 | Laura | "Supersonic" | 76 | 7 | 3,871 | 12 | 19 | 1 |
| 10 | Windy Beach | "Salty Wounds" | 44 | 4 | 643 | 3 | 7 | 9 |

Semi-final 2 – 20 February 2016
| R/O | Artist | Song | Jury | | Televote | | Total | Place |
| R/O | Artist | Song | Votes | Points | Votes | Points | Total | Place |
|---|---|---|---|---|---|---|---|---|
| 1 | Go Away Bird | "Sally" | 77 | 8 | 1,585 | 3 | 11 | 5 |
| 2 | Jüri Pootsmann | "Play" | 110 | 12 | 3,898 | 12 | 24 | 1 |
| 3 | Meisterjaan | "Parmupillihullus" | 52 | 4 | 2,327 | 7 | 11 | 4 |
| 4 | I Wear* Experiment | "Patience" | 94 | 10 | 1,587 | 4 | 14 | 3 |
| 5 | Púr Múdd | "Meet Halfway" | 63 | 6 | 1,543 | 2 | 8 | 8 |
| 6 | Grete Paia | "Stories Untold" | 57 | 5 | 2,876 | 10 | 15 | 2 |
| 7 | Põhja-Tallinn and Jaagup Kreem | "Ei ole mul olla" | 40 | 3 | 1,986 | 6 | 9 | 7 |
| 8 | Anett Kulbin | "Strong" | 76 | 7 | 1,499 | 1 | 8 | 9 |
| 9 | Gertu Pabbo | "Miljon korda" | 39 | 2 | 1,832 | 5 | 7 | 10 |
| 10 | La La Ladies | "Unikaalne" | 30 | 1 | 2,698 | 8 | 9 | 6 |

==== Final ====
The final took place on 5 March 2016 at the Saku Suurhall in Tallinn, hosted by Ott Sepp and Märt Avandi. The five entries that qualified from each of the two preceding semi-finals, all together ten songs, competed during the show. The winner was selected over two rounds of voting. In the first round, a jury (50%) and public televote (50%) determined the top three entries to proceed to the superfinal. The public vote in the first round registered 93,577 votes. In the superfinal, "Play" performed by Jüri Pootsmann was selected as the winner entirely by a public televote. The public televote in the superfinal registered 72,518 votes. In addition to the performances of the competing entries, Finnish singer Isac Elliot performed as the interval act, while Maarja-Liis Ilus and Ivo Linna, who represented Estonia in the Eurovision Song Contest 1996, celebrated the 20th anniversary of their participation in the contest by performing their entry "Kaelakee hääl". The jury panel that voted in the first round of the final consisted of Ģirts Majors (Positivus Festival organizer), Liis Lemsalu (singer), Olav Ehala (maestro), Anna Sapronenko (ETV+ television presenter), Koit Raudsepp (Raadio 2 presenter), Ingrid Kohtla (Tallinn Music Week organiser), Kristjan Hirmo (DJ), Heli Jürgenson (choir conductor), Siim Nestor (music critic), Sandra Sillamaa (bagpiper) and Isac Elliot (singer).

Final – 5 March 2016
| R/O | Artist | Song | Jury | | Televote | | Total | Place |
| R/O | Artist | Song | Votes | Points | Votes | Points | Total | Place |
|---|---|---|---|---|---|---|---|---|
| 1 | Laura | "Supersonic" | 64 | 6 | 16,416 | 10 | 16 | 2 |
| 2 | Go Away Bird | "Sally" | 52 | 4 | 2,960 | 2 | 6 | 8 |
| 3 | Mick Pedaja | "Seis" | 91 | 10 | 6,393 | 5 | 15 | 4 |
| 4 | Grete Paia | "Stories Untold" | 41 | 2 | 7,337 | 6 | 8 | 7 |
| 5 | Kéa | "Lonely Boy" | 64 | 5 | 1,374 | 1 | 6 | 9 |
| 6 | Jüri Pootsmann | "Play" | 108 | 12 | 23,439 | 12 | 24 | 1 |
| 7 | Kati Laev and Noorkuu | "Kaugel sinust" | 18 | 1 | 5,837 | 4 | 5 | 10 |
| 8 | Cartoon feat. Kristel Aaslaid | "Immortality" | 78 | 8 | 15,903 | 8 | 16 | 3 |
| 9 | Meisterjaan | "Parmupillihullus" | 44 | 3 | 8,340 | 7 | 10 | 5 |
| 10 | I Wear* Experiment | "Patience" | 78 | 7 | 5,578 | 3 | 10 | 6 |

Detailed Jury Votes
| R/O | Song | Ģ. Majors | L. Lemsalu | O. Ehala | A. Sapronenko | K. Raudsepp | I. Kohtla | K. Hirmo | H. Jürgenson | S. Nestor | S. Sillamaa | I. Elliot | Total |
|---|---|---|---|---|---|---|---|---|---|---|---|---|---|
| 1 | "Supersonic" | 2 | 7 | 8 | 10 | 6 | 3 | 6 | 5 | 7 | 5 | 5 | 64 |
| 2 | "Sally" | 3 | 3 | 3 | 8 | 10 | 10 | 2 | 3 | 6 | 3 | 1 | 52 |
| 3 | "Seis" | 12 | 12 | 12 | 12 | 1 | 5 | 7 | 2 | 12 | 12 | 4 | 91 |
| 4 | "Stories Untold" | 4 | 4 | 4 | 4 | 5 | 2 | 4 | 8 | 1 | 2 | 3 | 41 |
| 5 | "Lonely Boy" | 5 | 5 | 6 | 3 | 8 | 7 | 3 | 6 | 8 | 6 | 7 | 64 |
| 6 | "Play" | 10 | 10 | 5 | 5 | 12 | 12 | 12 | 12 | 10 | 10 | 10 | 108 |
| 7 | "Kaugel sinust" | 1 | 1 | 1 | 2 | 2 | 1 | 1 | 4 | 2 | 1 | 2 | 18 |
| 8 | "Immortality" | 8 | 8 | 7 | 7 | 3 | 4 | 8 | 10 | 4 | 7 | 12 | 78 |
| 9 | "Parmupillihullus" | 6 | 2 | 2 | 1 | 4 | 6 | 5 | 1 | 5 | 4 | 8 | 44 |
| 10 | "Patience" | 7 | 6 | 10 | 6 | 7 | 8 | 10 | 7 | 3 | 8 | 6 | 78 |

Superfinal – 5 March 2016
| R/O | Artist | Song | Televote | Place |
|---|---|---|---|---|
| 1 | Laura | "Supersonic" | 21,001 | 2 |
| 2 | Jüri Pootsmann | "Play" | 32,394 | 1 |
| 3 | Cartoon feat. Kristel Aaslaid | "Immortality" | 19,123 | 3 |

=== Promotion ===
Jüri Pootsmann made several appearances across Europe to specifically promote "Play" as the Estonian Eurovision entry. On 2 April, Pootsmann performed during the Eurovision PreParty Riga, which was organised by OGAE Latvia and held at the Spikeri Concert Hall in Riga, Latvia. On 9 April, Jüri Pootsmann performed during the Eurovision in Concert event which was held at the Melkweg venue in Amsterdam, Netherlands and hosted by Cornald Maas and Hera Björk. Between 11 and 13 April, Jüri Pootsmann took part in promotional activities in Tel Aviv, Israel and was also scheduled to perform during the Israel Calling event held at the Ha'teatron venue, but he withdrew from the event due to illness. On 27 April, Jüri Pootsmann completed interviews for media outlets and radio stations in Finland.

== At Eurovision ==
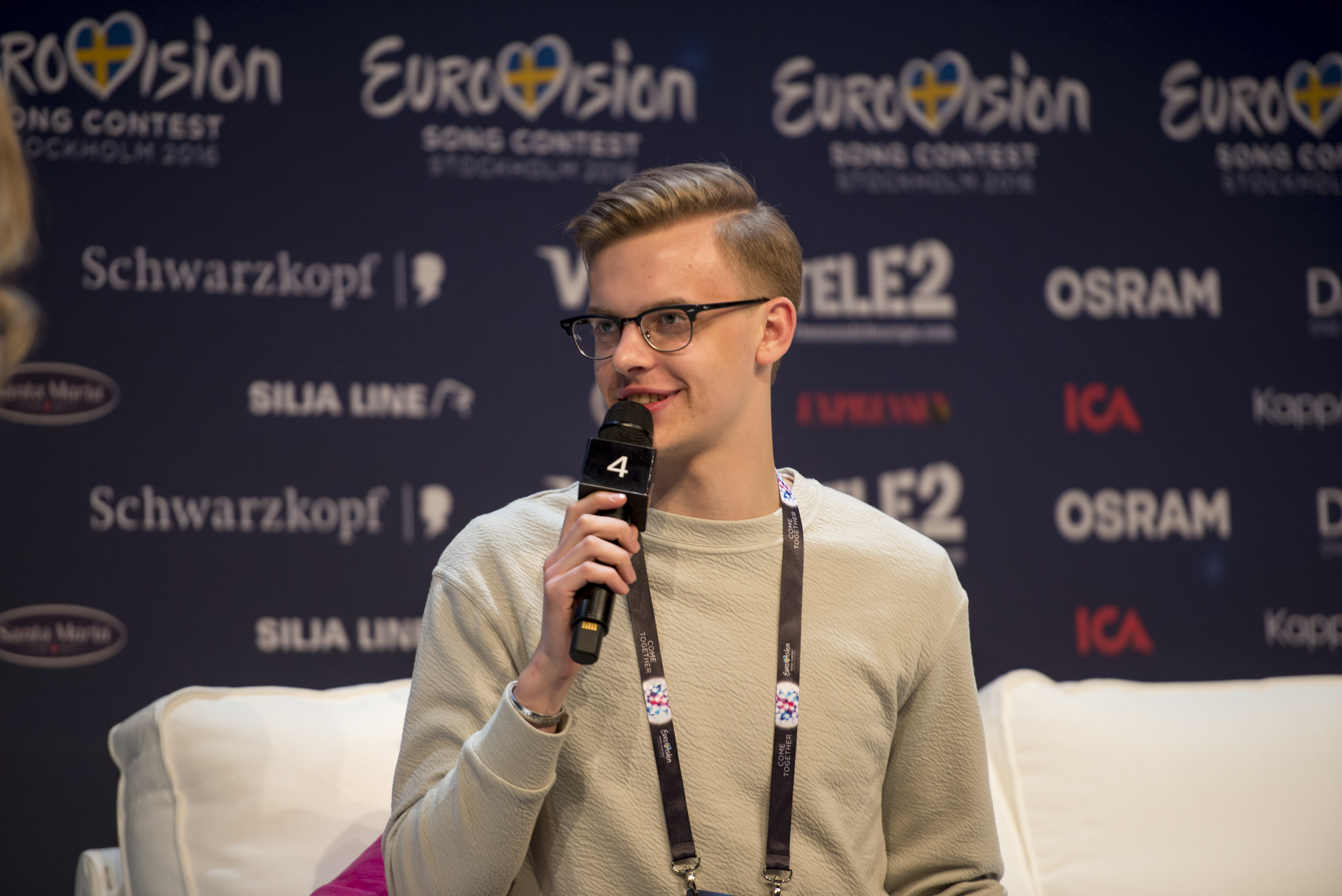
Jüri Pootsmann during a press meet and greet

According to Eurovision rules, all nations with the exceptions of the host country and the "Big Five" (France, Germany, Italy, Spain and the United Kingdom) are required to qualify from one of two semi-finals in order to compete for the final; the top ten countries from each semi-final progress to the final. The European Broadcasting Union (EBU) split up the competing countries into six different pots based on voting patterns from previous contests, with countries with favourable voting histories put into the same pot. On 25 January 2016, an allocation draw was held which placed each country into one of the two semi-finals, as well as which half of the show they would perform in. Estonia was placed into the first semi-final, to be held on 10 May 2016, and was scheduled to perform in the second half of the show.

Once all the competing songs for the 2016 contest had been released, the running order for the semi-finals was decided by the shows' producers rather than through another draw, so that similar songs were not placed next to each other. Estonia was set to perform in position 13, following the entry from Austria and before the entry from Azerbaijan.

The two semi-finals and the final were broadcast in Estonia on ETV with commentary in Estonian by Marko Reikop and on ETV+ with commentary in Russian by Aleksandr Hobotov. The first semi-final and final were also broadcast via radio on Raadio 2 with Estonian commentary by Mart Juur and Andrus Kivirähk. The Estonian spokesperson, who announced the top 12-point score awarded by the Estonian jury during the final, was Daniel Levi Viinalass.

=== Semi-final ===
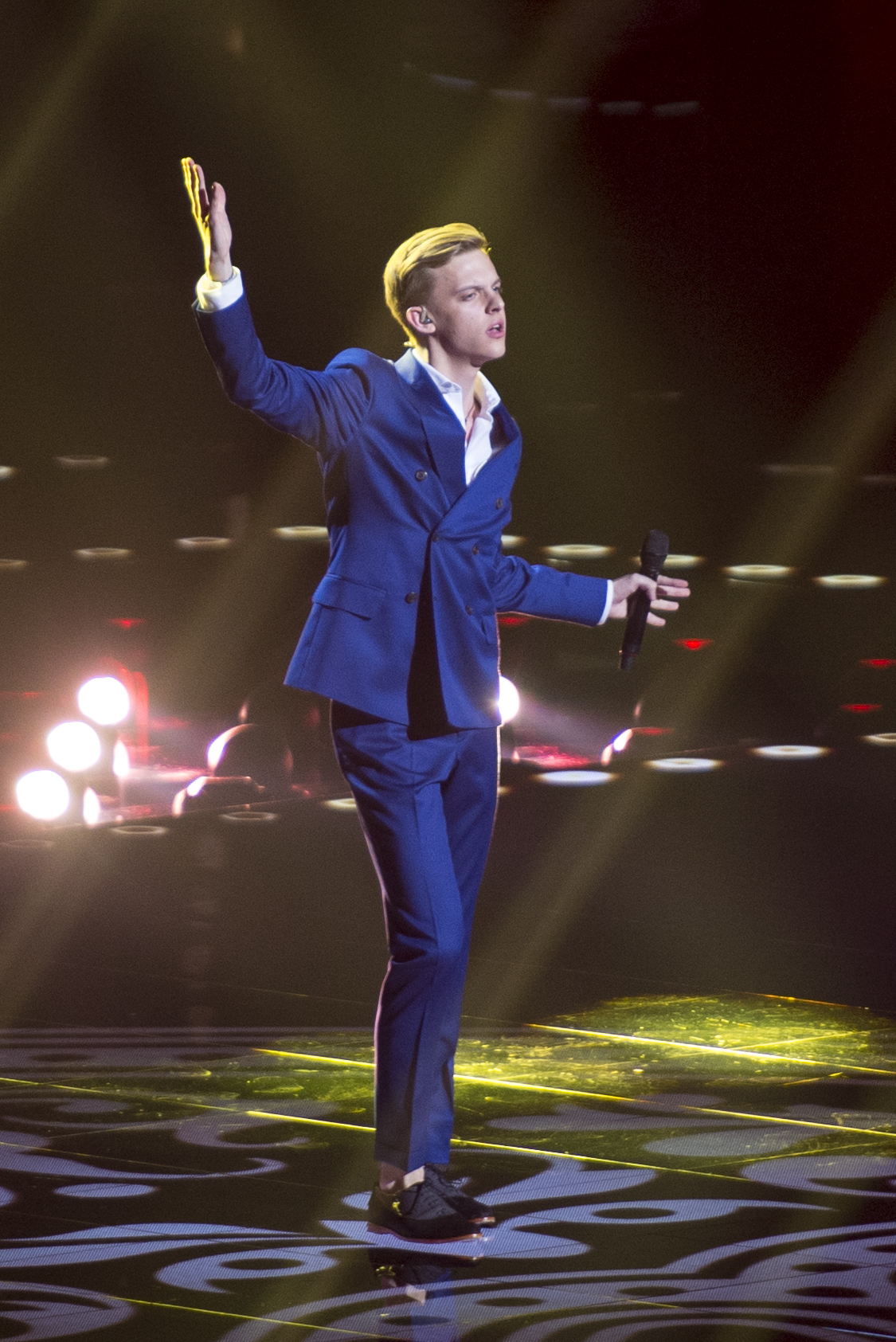
Jüri Pootsmann during a rehearsal before the first semi-final

Jüri Pootsmann took part in technical rehearsals on 3 and 6 May, followed by dress rehearsals on 9 and 10 May. This included the jury show on 9 May where the professional juries of each country watched and voted on the competing entries.

The Estonian performance featured Jüri Pootsmann performing on stage in a blue suit with the stage displaying red, gold and white colours and images of playing cards and baroque style patterns appearing on the LED screens. During the performance, Pootsmann performed a trick where he drew a playing card from his sleeve. Jüri Pootsmann was joined by three backing vocalists: Kaire Vilgats, Dagmar Oja and Silver Laas.

At the end of the show, Estonia was not announced among the top 10 entries in the first semi-final and therefore failed to qualify to compete in the final. It was later revealed that Estonia placed 18th (last) in the semi-final, receiving a total of 24 points: 15 points from the televoting and 9 points from the juries.

=== Voting ===
Voting during the three shows was conducted under a new system that involved each country now awarding two sets of points from 1-8, 10 and 12: one from their professional jury and the other from televoting. Each nation's jury consisted of five music industry professionals who are citizens of the country they represent, with their names published before the contest to ensure transparency. This jury judged each entry based on: vocal capacity; the stage performance; the song's composition and originality; and the overall impression by the act. In addition, no member of a national jury was permitted to be related in any way to any of the competing acts in such a way that they cannot vote impartially and independently. The individual rankings of each jury member as well as the nation's televoting results were released shortly after the grand final.

Below is a breakdown of points awarded to Estonia and awarded by Estonia in the first semi-final and grand final of the contest, and the breakdown of the jury voting and televoting conducted during the two shows:

==== Points awarded to Estonia ====
Points awarded to Estonia (Semi-final 1)
| Score | Televote | Jury |
|---|---|---|
| 12 points | Finland | |
| 10 points | | |
| 8 points | | |
| 7 points | | |
| 6 points | | |
| 5 points | | |
| 4 points | | |
| 3 points | | |
| 2 points | Azerbaijan | Malta; Moldova; Russia |
| 1 point | Moldova | Austria; Azerbaijan; Finland |

==== Points awarded by Estonia ====
Points awarded by Estonia (Semi-final 1)
| Score | Televote | Jury |
|---|---|---|
| 12 points | Russia | Netherlands |
| 10 points | Austria | Cyprus |
| 8 points | Netherlands | Malta |
| 7 points | Finland | Azerbaijan |
| 6 points | Cyprus | Czech Republic |
| 5 points | Hungary | Hungary |
| 4 points | San Marino | Iceland |
| 3 points | Iceland | Croatia |
| 2 points | Malta | Armenia |
| 1 point | Armenia | Russia |

Points awarded by Estonia (Final)
| Score | Televote | Jury |
|---|---|---|
| 12 points | Russia | Sweden |
| 10 points | Sweden | Australia |
| 8 points | Ukraine | Latvia |
| 7 points | Latvia | Ukraine |
| 6 points | Austria | Netherlands |
| 5 points | Lithuania | Lithuania |
| 4 points | Australia | Cyprus |
| 3 points | Cyprus | United Kingdom |
| 2 points | France | Malta |
| 1 point | Poland | France |

==== Detailed voting results ====
The following members comprised the Estonian jury:

- Priit Pajusaar (jury chairperson) – composer
- Els Himma – singer
- Kadri Koppel – professional singer, vocal coach and songwriter
- Hanna Parman – artist and teacher
- Taavi Paomets – independent musician, music producer

Detailed voting results from Estonia (Semi-final 1)
| R/O | Country | Jury | | | | | | | Televote | |
| R/O | Country | P. Pajusaar | E. Himma | K. Koppel | T. Paomets | H. Parman | Rank | Points | Rank | Points |
|---|---|---|---|---|---|---|---|---|---|---|
| 01 | Finland | 12 | 2 | 9 | 11 | 17 | 11 | | 4 | 7 |
| 02 | Greece | 16 | 17 | 17 | 7 | 14 | 15 | | 16 | |
| 03 | Moldova | 14 | 9 | 10 | 13 | 13 | 13 | | 13 | |
| 04 | Hungary | 5 | 6 | 7 | 14 | 4 | 6 | 5 | 6 | 5 |
| 05 | Croatia | 9 | 15 | 11 | 4 | 1 | 8 | 3 | 12 | |
| 06 | Netherlands | 1 | 7 | 2 | 1 | 6 | 1 | 12 | 3 | 8 |
| 07 | Armenia | 11 | 12 | 4 | 6 | 7 | 9 | 2 | 10 | 1 |
| 08 | San Marino | 13 | 16 | 16 | 16 | 11 | 16 | | 7 | 4 |
| 09 | Russia | 10 | 4 | 8 | 9 | 12 | 10 | 1 | 1 | 12 |
| 10 | Czech Republic | 7 | 14 | 1 | 3 | 10 | 5 | 6 | 14 | |
| 11 | Cyprus | 4 | 3 | 5 | 8 | 2 | 2 | 10 | 5 | 6 |
| 12 | Austria | 2 | 13 | 13 | 17 | 15 | 14 | | 2 | 10 |
| 13 | Estonia | | | | | | | | | |
| 14 | Azerbaijan | 8 | 1 | 6 | 5 | 8 | 4 | 7 | 11 | |
| 15 | Montenegro | 15 | 10 | 14 | 12 | 3 | 12 | | 15 | |
| 16 | Iceland | 6 | 5 | 12 | 10 | 5 | 7 | 4 | 8 | 3 |
| 17 | Bosnia and Herzegovina | 17 | 11 | 15 | 15 | 16 | 17 | | 17 | |
| 18 | Malta | 3 | 8 | 3 | 2 | 9 | 3 | 8 | 9 | 2 |

Detailed voting results from Estonia (Final)
| R/O | Country | Jury | | | | | | | Televote | |
| R/O | Country | P. Pajusaar | E. Himma | K. Koppel | T. Paomets | H. Parman | Rank | Points | Rank | Points |
|---|---|---|---|---|---|---|---|---|---|---|
| 01 | Belgium | 13 | 18 | 17 | 4 | 12 | 14 | | 19 | |
| 02 | Czech Republic | 18 | 23 | 5 | 13 | 19 | 17 | | 25 | |
| 03 | Netherlands | 8 | 4 | 4 | 7 | 13 | 5 | 6 | 12 | |
| 04 | Azerbaijan | 14 | 15 | 20 | 21 | 18 | 19 | | 18 | |
| 05 | Hungary | 19 | 2 | 19 | 26 | 11 | 16 | | 11 | |
| 06 | Italy | 10 | 6 | 10 | 24 | 9 | 11 | | 13 | |
| 07 | Israel | 25 | 21 | 18 | 25 | 14 | 24 | | 22 | |
| 08 | Bulgaria | 20 | 17 | 24 | 17 | 21 | 22 | | 14 | |
| 09 | Sweden | 2 | 3 | 1 | 1 | 1 | 1 | 12 | 2 | 10 |
| 10 | Germany | 21 | 20 | 25 | 16 | 22 | 25 | | 23 | |
| 11 | France | 17 | 1 | 9 | 15 | 15 | 10 | 1 | 9 | 2 |
| 12 | Poland | 22 | 9 | 23 | 22 | 23 | 23 | | 10 | 1 |
| 13 | Australia | 3 | 11 | 2 | 5 | 7 | 2 | 10 | 7 | 4 |
| 14 | Cyprus | 12 | 5 | 13 | 19 | 6 | 7 | 4 | 8 | 3 |
| 15 | Serbia | 26 | 24 | 26 | 20 | 24 | 26 | | 26 | |
| 16 | Lithuania | 7 | 14 | 8 | 9 | 2 | 6 | 5 | 6 | 5 |
| 17 | Croatia | 11 | 19 | 16 | 12 | 5 | 13 | | 24 | |
| 18 | Russia | 16 | 10 | 11 | 18 | 26 | 18 | | 1 | 12 |
| 19 | Spain | 24 | 25 | 15 | 14 | 10 | 20 | | 17 | |
| 20 | Latvia | 4 | 7 | 7 | 8 | 4 | 3 | 8 | 4 | 7 |
| 21 | Ukraine | 1 | 8 | 3 | 3 | 20 | 4 | 7 | 3 | 8 |
| 22 | Malta | 6 | 22 | 6 | 6 | 17 | 9 | 2 | 20 | |
| 23 | Georgia | 23 | 26 | 22 | 2 | 3 | 15 | | 15 | |
| 24 | Austria | 9 | 16 | 21 | 23 | 25 | 21 | | 5 | 6 |
| 25 | United Kingdom | 5 | 13 | 12 | 10 | 16 | 8 | 3 | 21 | |
| 26 | Armenia | 15 | 12 | 14 | 11 | 8 | 12 | | 16 | |
