= Aleksandra Gintrowska =

Polish singer and actress (born 1991)

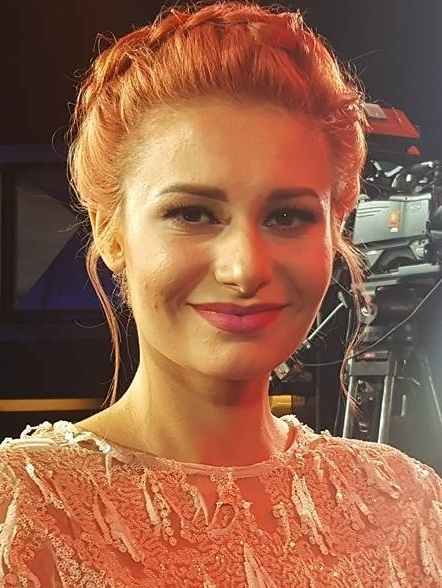
- Gintrowska, 2017
- Born: March 28, 1991 (age 35); Szczecinek, Poland
- Education: Kingston University
- Occupations: Singer; actress
- Years active: 2010–present
- Height: 5 ft 10 in (1.78 m)

Aleksandra Gintrowska (born March 28, 1991) is a Polish singer and actress also appearing under the pseudonym O.L.A. which translates as "the heart of the word POLAND".

== Early life and education ==
Gintrowska was born in Szczecinek in 1991. She comes from a family rooted in musical traditions. One of her grandparents sang in a choir, another played the violin. Her mother was a singer and her sister plays the cello. She studied singing at schools in Szczecinek. During her primary school education, she learned to play the piano. Then she studied at the Private High School and the 'Opera Singing Department' of the 'Secondary Music School of Oskar Kolberg'. She consequently left for Warsaw where she passed her international high school diploma. She then enrolled in Kingston University, where she obtained a bachelor's degree in drama and opera singing. During her student days, she performed in choir and academic performances in such venues as The Fighting Cocks as well as in musicals such as This Is Musical, Gems from the Shows and Cell Block Tango, staged at theaters in London.

== Music career ==
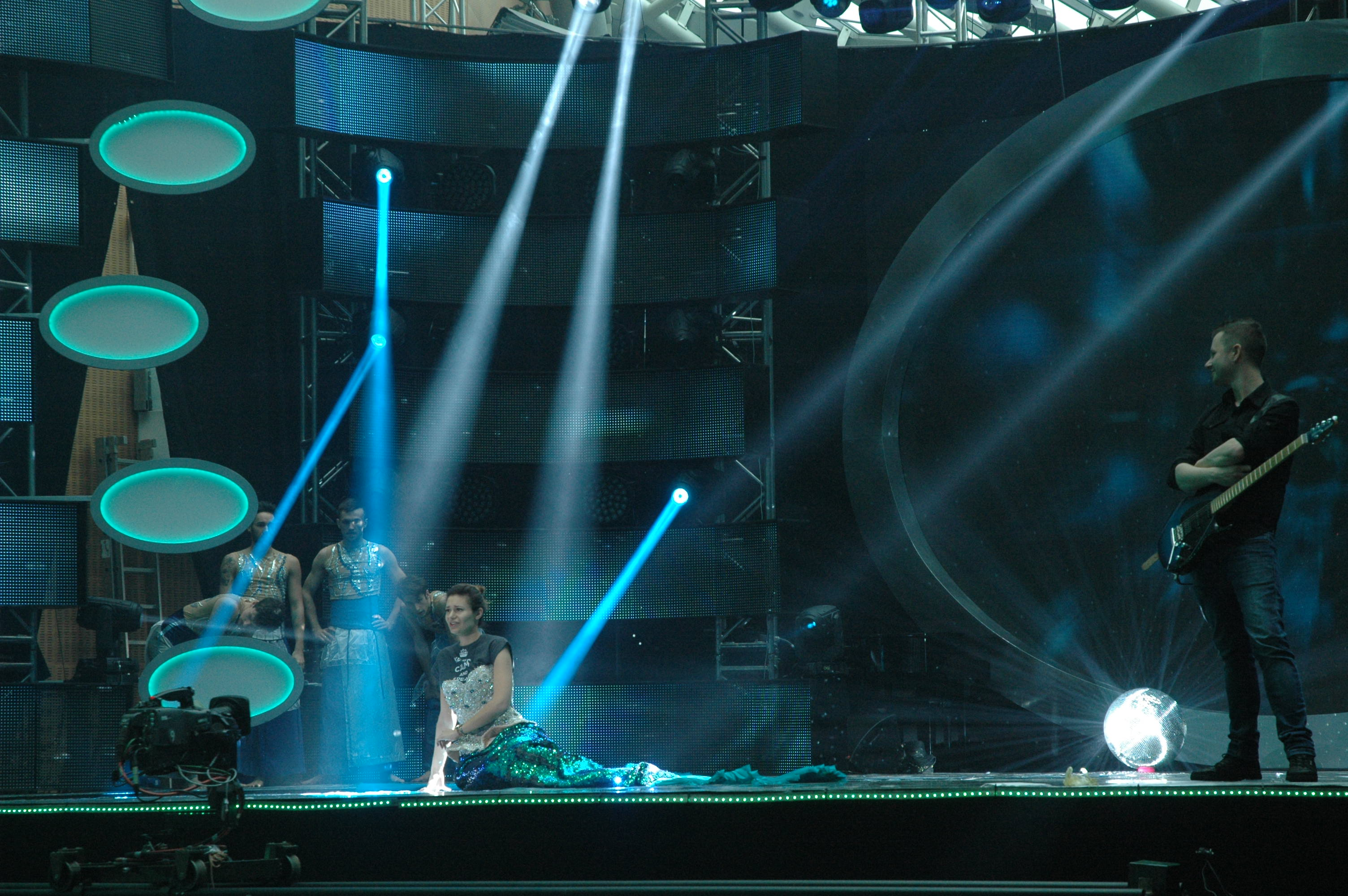
Gintrowska during the rehearsal for Poland's National Qualifiers for the 61st Eurovision Song Contest, March 2016.

In 2015, she released the single "Missing" composed by Robert Janson which was used by Polsat as the theme song for their show Must Be the Music. In 2016, she qualified with the song to the finals of the national Eurovision Song Contest Qualifiers. The mermaid costume in which she appeared in the preliminaries became the subject of nationwide media publications. In August 2016, she released the single "Best That I've Felt," which was produced by Ryan Tedder. In December 2016, she published the song "Rowdy", and at the end of January 2017 she presented her first Polish-language single – "White Magic", which was created in collaboration with Robert Janson. On December 17, 2019, she performed live at the ‘Most Beautiful Carols’ televised concert, which took place in the 'Parish Church of Our Lady of Częstochowa' in Lubin on Christmas Eve and during the New Year's televised concert in Warsaw with the choir both broadcast on TVN.

== Discography ==
- 2015: – Missing.
- 2016: – Best That I’ve Felt.
- 2016: – Rowdy.
- 2017: – Biała magia.

== Filmography ==
Gintrowska played Monika in Barbara Sass’ film In the Name of the Devil (2011) and Jola in the film Gwiazdy by Jan Kidawa-Błoński (2017). In 2018, she played supporting roles in television series such as in Pierwsza miłość (English: First Love), a Polish soap opera set in Wrocław or in M jak miłość (lit. L for Love) broadcast on the international channel TVP Polonia and revolving around the multiple generations of the Mostowiak family. This show has been the most-watched drama on Polish television since and its popularity led to a Russian adaptation, entitled Lyubov kak Lyubov. The same year she also starred in two episodes of the Polish thriller medical drama Diagnosis (original title: Diagnoza) produced by TVN. She was a participant in Polsat's entertainment program Twoja twarz brzmi znajomo (season 8) (based on the Spanish series: Your Face Sounds Familiar, 2017) and a juror in the Talent competition Śpiewajmy razem. All Together Now (2019) based on the British show All Together Now.

Film

Year (Note: Refers to the film's earliest release)	Title	Role	Director(s)	Notes
2017	Gwiazdy	Jola	Jan Kidawa-Błoński	
2011	On behalf of the devil	Monika	Barbara Sass	W imieniu diabła

Television

Year (Note: Refers to the film's earliest release)	Title	Role	Director(s)	Notes
2019	Śpiewajmy razem. All Together Now	herself	Polsat	based on All Together Now
2018	Pierwsza miłość	Urszula Dzieciatkiewicz	Ewa Pytka	English: First Love.
2018	M jak miłość	Goska	TVP2	English: L for Love. Season 1 | Episodes 1360; 1366 & 1370.
2018	Diagnosis	Zuza	Maciej Bochniak & Lukasz Palkowski	Season 2 Episodes 6 & 7. original title: Diagnoza.
2017	Twoja twarz brzmi znajomo.	herself	Polsat	based on the Spanish series: Your Face Sounds Familiar.
