= Barbara Sass =

Polish screenwriter and director (1936–2015)

Barbara Sass-Zdort (14 October 1936 – 2 April 2015) was a Polish screenwriter and film/stage director. In 1975, she graduated from the National Film School in Łódź. She was married to the cinematographer Wiesław Zdort. Mother of famous Polish lawyer Pawel Zdort (Weil, Gotshal & Manges LPP, and Rymarz Zdort) and journalist Dominik Zdort.(TVP).

== Awards ==
She received numerous awards, including FIPRESCI Prize (1980,1996), Prize for Best Debut Director at the Polish Film Festival (1980), and the Krzysztof Kieślowski Beyond Borders Award for Best Feature at the New York Polish Film Festival (2012). Nominated for Crystal Globe for Temptation (Pokuszene) at the Karlovy Vary International Film Festival in 1996.

== Selected filmography ==
- 1980 – Bez miłości (Without Love)
- 1981 – Debiutantka (Debutante)
- 1982 – Krzyk (Scream)
- 1993 – Pajęczarki (Spider Women)
- 1995 – Pokuszenie (Temptation)
- 1999 – Jak narkotyk (Like a Drug)
- 2011 – W imieniu diabła (In the Name of the Devil)
