= Azerbaijan in the Eurovision Song Contest 2016 =

- Eurovision Song Contest 2016
- Country: Azerbaijan
- Selection process: Internal selection
- Announcement date: Artist: 10 March 2016; Song: 13 March 2016

Competing entry
- Song: "Miracle"
- Artist: Samra
- Songwriters: Amir Aly; Jakke "T.I Jakke" Erixson; Henrik Wikström

Placement
- Semi-final result: Qualified (6th, 185 points)
- Final result: 17th, 117 points

Participation chronology

Azerbaijan was represented at the Eurovision Song Contest 2016 with the song "Miracle" written by Amir Aly, Jakke "T.I Jakke" Erixson and Henrik Wikström. The song was performed by Samra, who was internally selected by the Azerbaijani broadcaster İctimai Television (İTV) to represent the nation at the 2016 contest in Stockholm, Sweden. Samra's selection as the Azerbaijani Eurovision entrant was announced on 10 March 2016, while the song "Miracle" was presented to the public on 13 March.

Azerbaijan was drawn to compete in the first semi-final of the Eurovision Song Contest which took place on 10 May 2016. Performing during the show in position 14, "Miracle" was announced among the top 10 entries of the first semi-final and therefore qualified to compete in the final on 14 May. It was later revealed that Azerbaijan placed sixth out of the 18 participating countries in the semi-final with 185 points. In the final, Azerbaijan performed in position 4 and placed seventeenth out of the 26 participating countries, scoring 117 points.

== Background ==
Prior to the 2016 contest, Azerbaijan had participated in the Eurovision Song Contest eight times since its first entry in 2008. Azerbaijan had won the contest on one occasion in 2011 with the song "Running Scared" performed by Ell and Nikki. Since their debut in 2008, Azerbaijan has had a string of successful results, qualifying to the final and placing in the top ten each year until 2014, including a third-place result in 2009 with the song "Always" performed by AySel and Arash and a second-place result in 2013 with the song "Hold Me" performed by Farid Mammadov. However, in 2014, Azerbaijan achieved their lowest placing in the contest to this point, placing 22nd in the final with the song "Start a Fire" performed by Dilara Kazimova. In 2015, Azerbaijan placed twelfth with the song "Hour of the Wolf" performed by Elnur Hüseynov, who was also the first artist to represent the nation twice at the contest; Hüseynov previously represented Azerbaijan in its debut appearance at the 2008 contest where he performed the song "Day After Day" together with Samir Javadzadeh.

The Azerbaijani national broadcaster, İctimai Television (İTV), broadcasts the event within Azerbaijan and organises the selection process for the nation's entry. İTV confirmed their intentions to participate at the 2016 Eurovision Song Contest on 13 September 2015. Azerbaijan had used various methods to select the Azerbaijani entry in the past, including internal selections of both the artist and song, as well as national finals to select their artist followed by an internal selection to determine the song. Between 2011 and 2013, Azerbaijan organized a national final titled Milli Seçim Turu to select the performer, song or both for Eurovision. In 2014, the broadcaster utilised an existing talent show format titled Böyük Səhnə where the winning performer would subsequently be given an internally selected song. In 2015, the broadcaster internally selected both the artist and song that represented Azerbaijan, a procedure which continued for the selection of their 2016 entry.

== Before Eurovision ==
=== Internal selection ===
On 29 January 2016, İTV announced that both the artist and song that would represent Azerbaijan at the Eurovision Song Contest 2016 would be selected internally. Their announcement called for interested artists and songwriters to submit their applications and entries to the broadcaster by 10 February 2016. Eligible artists were those that were citizens of Azerbaijan or part of the Azerbaijani diaspora, while songwriters could be of any nationality.

Although the selected song and artist was due to be announced on 14 March 2016, İTV announced on 10 March 2016 that Samra Rahimli would represent Azerbaijan, performing the song "Miracle". The selection of Samra as the Azerbaijani Eurovision contestant was based on the decision of İTV and participants of an opinion survey that featured more than 100 music and television industry experts and Eurovision fans from over 35 European countries, while "Miracle" was selected from over 400 submissions from local and international songwriters in a similar method. "Miracle" was written by Amir Aly, Jakke "T.I Jakke" Erixson and Henrik Wikström, and was presented on 13 March 2016 via the release of the official music video. In regards to the song, Samra stated: "Though this song is a story of a painful break-up, it's not a ballad as one may think. For me it's the anthem of a strong and brave girl. I hope it can inspire those who lost their love to take the right decision and move on. May this become a real Miracle for me!"

=== Promotion ===
Samra made several appearances across Europe to specifically promote "Miracle" as the Azerbaijani Eurovision entry. On 3 April, Samra performed during the Eurovision Pre-Party, which was held at the Izvestia Hall in Moscow, Russia and hosted by Dmitry Guberniev. Between 11 and 13 April, Samra took part in promotional activities in Tel Aviv, Israel and performed during the Israel Calling event held at the Ha'teatron venue. Between 21 and 22 April, Samra competed promotional activities in Malta by appearing during the TVM talk show programmes Skjetti and Xarabank. On 23 April, Samra performed "Miracle" during the E Channel programme Bravo Roula in Greece. On 25 April, Samra completed promotional activities in Serbia.

== At Eurovision ==
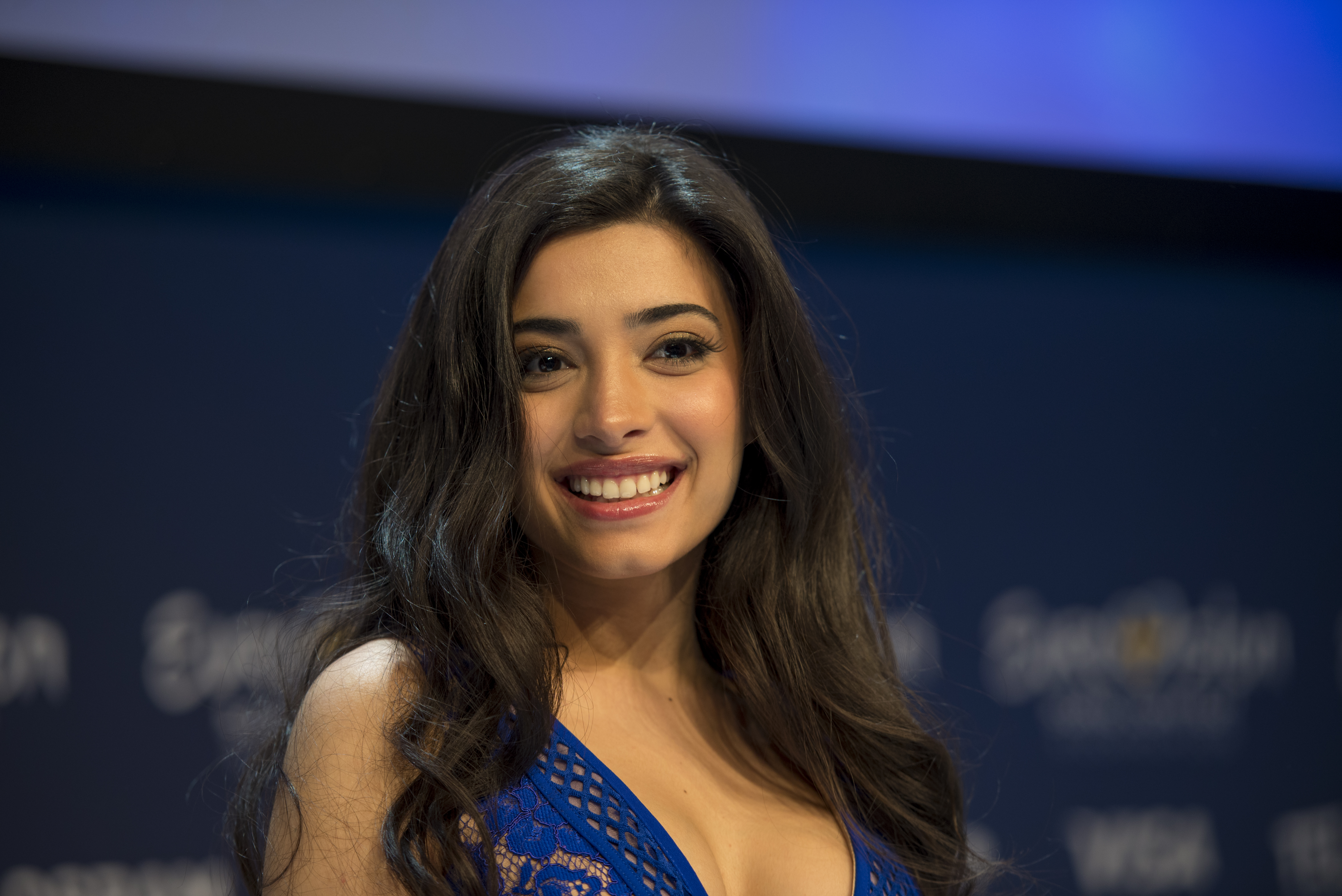
Samra during a press meet and greet

According to Eurovision rules, all nations with the exceptions of the host country and the "Big Five" (France, Germany, Italy, Spain and the United Kingdom) are required to qualify from one of two semi-finals in order to compete for the final; the top ten countries from each semi-final progress to the final. The European Broadcasting Union (EBU) split up the competing countries into six different pots based on voting patterns from previous contests, with countries with favourable voting histories put into the same pot. On 25 January 2016, a special allocation draw was held which placed each country into one of the two semi-finals, as well as which half of the show they would perform in. Azerbaijan was placed into the first semi-final, to be held on 10 May 2016, and was scheduled to perform in the second half of the show.

Once all the competing songs for the 2016 contest had been released, the running order for the semi-finals was decided by the shows' producers rather than through another draw, so that similar songs were not placed next to each other. Azerbaijan was set to perform in position 14, following the entry from Estonia and before the entry from Montenegro.

The two semi-finals and final were broadcast in Azerbaijan on İTV with commentary by Azer Suleymanli. The Azerbaijani spokesperson, who announced the top 12-point score awarded by the Azerbaijani jury during the final, was Tural Asadov.

=== Semi-final ===
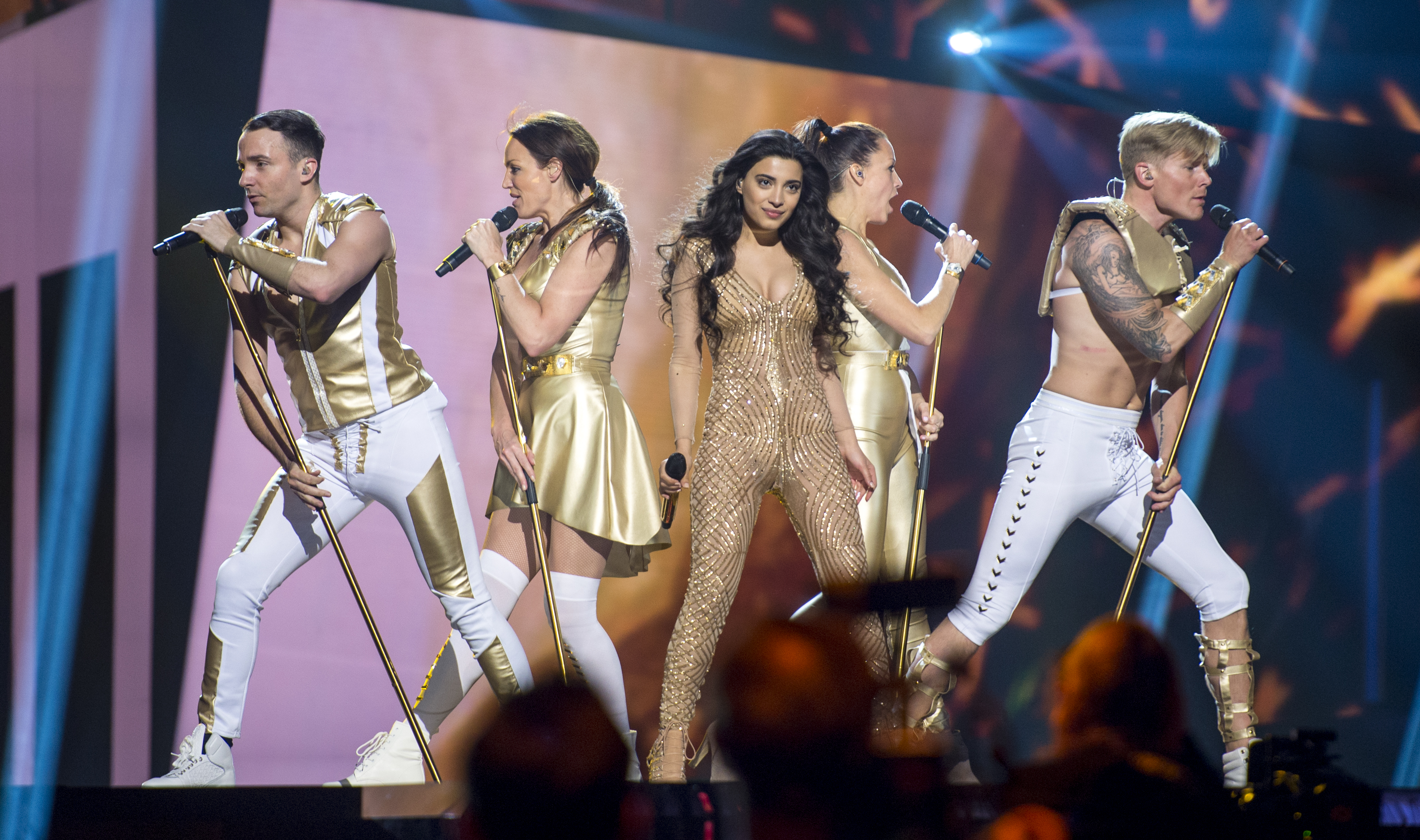
Samra during a rehearsal before the first semi-final

Samra took part in technical rehearsals on 3 and 6 May, followed by dress rehearsals on 9 and 10 May. This included the jury show on 9 May where the professional juries of each country watched and voted on the competing entries.

The Azerbaijani performance featured Samra dressed in a gold catsuit performing a choreographed routine with four backing vocalists/dancers. The LED stage floor and screens displayed beige and yellow geometric lines and the performance also incorporated pyrotechnics, which included flames and a waterfall effect. The performance was directed by Roine Söderlundh, who based the idea of the act around a modern and futuristic approach on the Alice in Wonderland novel. The four backing vocalists/dancers that joined Samra on stage were Jessica Marberger, Dea Norberg, Zain Odelstål and Patrik Riber. An additional off-stage backing vocalist, Anna Engh, was also part of the performance.

At the end of the show, Azerbaijan was announced as having finished in the top 10 and subsequently qualifying for the grand final. It was later revealed that Azerbaijan placed sixth in the semi-final, receiving a total of 185 points: 93 points from the televoting and 92 points from the juries.

=== Final ===
Shortly after the first semi-final, a winners' press conference was held for the ten qualifying countries. As part of this press conference, the qualifying artists took part in a draw to determine which half of the grand final they would subsequently participate in. This draw was done in the order the countries appeared in the semi-final running order. Azerbaijan was drawn to compete in the first half. Following this draw, the shows' producers decided upon the running order of the final, as they had done for the semi-finals. Azerbaijan was subsequently placed to perform in position 4, following the entry from the Netherlands and before the entry from Hungary.

Samra once again took part in dress rehearsals on 13 and 14 May before the final, including the jury final where the professional juries cast their final votes before the live show. Samra performed a repeat of her semi-final performance during the final on 14 May. Azerbaijan placed seventeenth in the final, scoring 117 points: 73 points from the televoting and 44 points from the juries.

=== Voting ===
Voting during the three shows was conducted under a new system that involved each country now awarding two sets of points from 1-8, 10 and 12: one from their professional jury and the other from televoting. Each nation's jury consisted of five music industry professionals who are citizens of the country they represent, with their names published before the contest to ensure transparency. This jury judged each entry based on: vocal capacity; the stage performance; the song's composition and originality; and the overall impression by the act. In addition, no member of a national jury was permitted to be related in any way to any of the competing acts in such a way that they cannot vote impartially and independently. The individual rankings of each jury member as well as the nation's televoting results were released shortly after the grand final.

Below is a breakdown of points awarded to Azerbaijan and awarded by Azerbaijan in the first semi-final and grand final of the contest, and the breakdown of the jury voting and televoting conducted during the two shows:

==== Points awarded to Azerbaijan ====
Points awarded to Azerbaijan (Semi-final 1)
Score	Televote	Jury
12 points	Hungary; Moldova	
10 points	Bosnia and Herzegovina; Czech Republic; Malta; San Marino	Russia
8 points	Cyprus	Sweden
7 points	Iceland; Montenegro; Russia	Estonia; France; Hungary; Netherlands
6 points		Bosnia and Herzegovina; San Marino
5 points		Greece; Montenegro; Spain
4 points		Austria; Cyprus
3 points		Croatia; Czech Republic; Iceland
2 points		Finland
1 point		

Points awarded to Azerbaijan (Final)
Score	Televote	Jury
12 points		
10 points	Ukraine	Russia; Sweden
8 points	Belarus; Bosnia and Herzegovina; Moldova	
7 points	Georgia; Montenegro	Hungary; Ukraine
6 points	Czech Republic; Malta; Russia	
5 points		
4 points		
3 points	Latvia	
2 points	Israel	Belarus; Cyprus; Spain
1 point	Bulgaria; Iceland	Bosnia and Herzegovina; Greece; Macedonia; Netherlands

==== Points awarded by Azerbaijan ====
Points awarded by Azerbaijan (Semi-final 1)
Score	Televote	Jury
12 points	Russia	Russia
10 points	San Marino	Bosnia and Herzegovina
8 points	Malta	Hungary
7 points	Hungary	Montenegro
6 points	Austria	Greece
5 points	Bosnia and Herzegovina	Moldova
4 points	Netherlands	Malta
3 points	Czech Republic	San Marino
2 points	Estonia	Czech Republic
1 point	Cyprus	Estonia

Points awarded by Azerbaijan (Final)
Score	Televote	Jury
12 points	Russia	Russia
10 points	Ukraine	Ukraine
8 points	Bulgaria	Bulgaria
7 points	Hungary	Australia
6 points	Israel	Malta
5 points	Malta	Lithuania
4 points	France	Hungary
3 points	Poland	Israel
2 points	Australia	Poland
1 point	Georgia	Spain

==== Detailed voting results ====
The following members comprised the Azerbaijani jury:

- Gulchohra Shafiyeva (jury chairperson) – director
- Farid Aliyev – opera singer, tenor
- Brilliant Dadashova – pop singer
- Ayyub Guliyev – conductor
- Tarane Muradova – ballet-mistress

Detailed voting results from Azerbaijan (Semi-final 1)
R/O	Country	Jury							Televote	
R/O	Country	G. Shafiyeva	F. Aliyev	B. Dadashova	A. Guliyev	T. Muradova	Rank	Points	Rank	Points
01	Finland	11	13	10	14	11	12		17	
02	Greece	5	7	5	6	5	5	6	11	
03	Moldova	6	5	8	4	6	6	5	13	
04	Hungary	4	2	3	3	4	3	8	4	7
05	Croatia	13	10	9	10	13	11		12	
06	Netherlands	15	15	16	16	15	15		7	4
07	Armenia	17	17	17	17	17	17		14	
08	San Marino	7	8	7	8	7	8	3	2	10
09	Russia	1	1	2	1	2	1	12	1	12
10	Czech Republic	10	9	11	11	9	9	2	8	3
11	Cyprus	16	16	15	15	16	16		10	1
12	Austria	12	14	14	13	14	14		5	6
13	Estonia	9	11	12	9	10	10	1	9	2
14	Azerbaijan									
15	Montenegro	3	4	4	5	3	4	7	16	
16	Iceland	14	12	13	12	12	13		15	
17	Bosnia and Herzegovina	2	3	1	2	1	2	10	6	5
18	Malta	8	6	6	7	8	7	4	3	8

Detailed voting results from Azerbaijan (Final)
R/O	Country	Jury							Televote	
R/O	Country	G. Shafiyeva	F. Aliyev	A. Guliyev	B. Dadashova	T. Muradova	Rank	Points	Rank	Points
01	Belgium	17	11	23	23	23	22		16	
02	Czech Republic	10	23	14	18	10	16		20	
03	Netherlands	4	14	21	11	16	13		19	
04	Azerbaijan									
05	Hungary	3	22	8	6	3	7	4	4	7
06	Italy	13	21	19	19	21	21		13	
07	Israel	6	6	4	7	20	8	3	5	6
08	Bulgaria	7	2	6	5	9	3	8	3	8
09	Sweden	23	16	18	16	17	20		12	
10	Germany	20	19	17	24	22	23		22	
11	France	12	9	5	20	18	12		7	4
12	Poland	14	4	11	10	6	9	2	8	3
13	Australia	11	7	3	8	5	4	7	9	2
14	Cyprus	16	20	22	12	19	19		17	
15	Serbia	21	15	10	21	15	18		24	
16	Lithuania	8	12	7	9	4	6	5	18	
17	Croatia	9	8	20	14	8	11		21	
18	Russia	1	1	1	1	1	1	12	1	12
19	Spain	15	10	12	15	7	10	1	15	
20	Latvia	22	13	15	17	13	17		14	
21	Ukraine	2	3	2	2	2	2	10	2	10
22	Malta	5	5	9	3	14	5	6	6	5
23	Georgia	24	24	24	22	24	24		10	1
24	Austria	18	18	13	13	11	15		11	
25	United Kingdom	19	17	16	4	12	14		23	
26	Armenia	25	25	25	25	25	25		25	
