= 2016 in Icelandic music =

The following is a list of notable events and releases of the year 2016 in Icelandic music.

== Events ==
=== January ===
- 15
  - Icelandic broadcaster RÚV revealed the songs competing to be Iceland's entry in the Eurovision Song Contest 2016 during the Rás 2 radio programmes Virkir morgnar and Poppland. Five of the competitors enter English versions of their songs.

=== February ===
- 20
  - At Söngvakeppnin 2016 in Reykjavík's Laugardalshöll, Greta Salóme was selected to represent Iceland at the Eurovision Song Contest, with the song "Hear Them Calling".

=== July ===
- 6 – The 17th Folk music festival of Siglufjordur start in Siglufjordur (July 6 – 10).

== Album and Singles releases ==
=== February ===
Day	Album	Artist	Label	Notes	Ref.
9	The Colorist & Emiliana Torrini	The Colorist & Emiliana Torrini	Rough Trade		

=== July ===
Day	Album	Artist	Label	Notes	Ref.
15	Vulnicura Live	Björk	One Little Indian		

== See also ==
- 2016 in Iceland
- Music of Iceland
- Iceland in the Eurovision Song Contest 2016
