= EurovisionAgain =

2020–2021 2026 European TV series

- Created by: Rob Holley
- Presented by: Various presenters
- Countries of origin: List of countries
- Original languages: English and French
- No. of seasons: 3
- No. of episodes: 30 (list of episodes)

Production
- Production locations: Various host cities
- Running time: Variable
- Production company: European Broadcasting Union

Original release
- Network: YouTube
- Release: 21 March 2020 – 20 November 2021
- Release: 18 April – 25 April 2026

EurovisionAgain, usually stylized as #EurovisionAgain, was an initiative that initially ran from 21 March 2020 to 20 November 2021, and later briefly returned in April 2026, to re-broadcast previous finals of the Eurovision Song Contest on YouTube. Conceived by journalist Rob Holley during the COVID-19 lockdowns, it eventually became a collaborative effort between Eurovision fans, the European Broadcasting Union (EBU) and its member broadcasters.

== History ==
Upon hearing about the cancellation of the Eurovision Song Contest 2020 due to the COVID-19 pandemic, journalist Rob Holley launched an initiative to watch a past contest on YouTube every week as a replacement, eventually giving it the title EurovisionAgain. The initiative quickly became popular, so the EBU itself decided to partake. Every Saturday (which was shifted to the third Saturday of every month starting from 18 July 2020) at 21:00 CEST, the Eurovision YouTube channel would re-broadcast a final of a previous contest, revealed by the EurovisionAgain team 15 minutes before the start. Contests prior to 2004 were available for a limited time.

The initiative was generally received as a welcome distraction for Eurovision fans during the COVID-19 lockdowns. On Twitter, #EurovisionAgain regularly became a trending topic and received positive reactions from past participants. As part of the initiative, Holley collected over £24,700 for UK-based LGBTQ+ charities. The 2020 season ended with a special edition, where the 26 most popular songs that did not qualify for the final, one from each country, as chosen via the official Eurovision social media handles, were streamed and put to a fan-vote. Iceland's 2016 entry, "Hear Them Calling" by Greta Salóme, won the fan-vote.

On 19 June 2021, the second year of broadcasts commenced with a replay of the 1969 contest, the oldest edition to be featured as part of the initiative, and concluded on 20 November with a replay of the 2004 contest. Unlike the contents shown in 2020, the pre-2004 broadcasts were made available for a full month rather than one week. This season also included a special broadcast of the high-definition test tapes from the 2006 contest.

In August 2021, the EBU stated that it was planning to broadcast "as many finals as we can over the next few years" through the initiative. Despite this, there were no further updates on whether the initiative would return after 2021, and in August 2022, the EurovisionAgain Twitter account changed its biography line to "#EurovisionAgain - ran sync viewings of classic Eurovision Song Contests during the 2020/21 lockdowns", implying that the initiative had been concluded.

In 2026, the initiative was briefly revived ahead of the Eurovision Song Contest 2026 in Vienna, Austria, with the two finals previously held in the Austrian capital (1967 and 2015) being rebroadcast under the EurovisionAgain banner in April. The 2015 contest had previously been re-broadcast in April 2020.

=== Availability ===
The initiative was well received by fans as it had made it possible for viewers to experience older Eurovision finals, and also allowed fans access to higher quality copies of older finals than what was previously available. Due to copyright agreements, the EBU only has ownership of contests aired since 2004, with individual host broadcasters owning the rights to those before that. A large majority of the existing finals, especially those in the former half of the contest's history, had previously only been available as video tape recordings, often with generational loss, especially those from the 1950s and 60s. While only available for a short period of time, the copies released as part of EurovisionAgain were shortly reuploaded by fans, some of which were also restored or upscaled to high-definition.

== Format ==
Each replayed final is broadcast as a premiere on the Eurovision Song Contest's official YouTube channel, with fans encouraged to vote for their favorites during the interval. Once the broadcast ends, the final remains on YouTube for one month, (Note: For the 2020 season, the finals were made available for one week. Replays of contest finals held from 2004 onwards are permanently available as the EBU holds the copyright for those contests.) and the fan vote results are announced via Twitter. The selection of each broadcast is kept secret until 15 minutes before the start of the broadcast, with various hints and clues being posted on the EurovisionAgain Twitter account in the days and hours prior. For most of the final replays, a previous winner, participant, presenter or producer of the chosen year pre-records an introduction to be uploaded along with the reveal of which year is being broadcast. For the 2021 season, the broadcasts also included fan-made modern re-imaginings of the 20th-century contests' scoreboards, using 3D animation in the graphical style of the original scoreboards.

== Rebroadcast contests ==
Twenty-six of the previous contest finals were originally broadcast as part of EurovisionAgain, with two additional special broadcasts in 2020 and 2021 and one additional final in 2026.

Season	Date	Year re-broadcast	Host city	Fan-vote winner	Original result
2020 season (weekly)	21 March 2020	2013	(Sweden) Malmö	No voting	
2020 season (weekly)	28 March 2020	2006	(Greece) Athens	"Invincible"	5th out of 24
2020 season (weekly)	4 April 2020	2009	(Russia) Moscow	"Fairytale"	Winner (out of 25)
2020 season (weekly)	11 April 2020	2015	(Austria) Vienna	"Heroes"	Winner (out of 27)
2020 season (weekly)	18 April 2020	1997	(Republic of Ireland) Dublin	"Love Shine a Light"	Winner (out of 25)
2020 season (weekly)	26 April 2020	2007	(Finland) Helsinki	"Dancing Lasha Tumbai"	Runner-up (out of 24)
2020 season (weekly)	2 May 2020	2016	(Sweden) Stockholm	"Sound of Silence"	Runner-up (out of 26)
2020 season (weekly)	9 May 2020	1998	(United Kingdom) Birmingham	"Diva"	Winner (out of 25)
2020 season (weekly)	17 May 2020 (Note: Moved from the intended date of 16 May 2020 due to overlap with the broadcast of Eurovision: Europe Shine a Light.)	1974	(United Kingdom) Brighton	"Waterloo"	Winner (out of 18)
2020 season (weekly)	23 May 2020	2003	(Latvia) Riga	"Everyway That I Can"	Winner (out of 26)
2020 season (weekly)	30 May 2020	1991	(Italy) Rome	"Fångad av en stormvind"	Winner (out of 22)
2020 season (weekly)	6 June 2020	2018	(Portugal) Lisbon	"Fuego"	Runner-up (out of 26)
2020 season (weekly)	13 June 2020	1988	(Republic of Ireland) Dublin	"Ne partez pas sans moi"	Winner (out of 21)
2020 season (weekly)	20 June 2020	2008	(Serbia) Belgrade	"Shady Lady"	Runner-up (out of 25)
2020 season (weekly)	27 June 2020	2014	(Denmark) Copenhagen	"Rise Like a Phoenix"	Winner (out of 26)
2020 season (monthly)	18 July 2020	1999	(Israel) Jerusalem	"Take Me to Your Heaven"	Winner (out of 23)
2020 season (monthly)	15 August 2020	1985	(Sweden) Gothenburg	"La det swinge"	Winner (out of 19)
2020 season (monthly)	19 September 2020	2005	(Ukraine) Kyiv	"My Number One"	Winner (out of 24)
2020 season (monthly)	17 October 2020	1976	(Netherlands) The Hague	"Save Your Kisses for Me"	Winner (out of 18)
2020 season (monthly)	21 November 2020	1990	(Socialist Federal Republic of Yugoslavia) Zagreb	"Hajde da ludujemo"	7th out of 22
2020 season (monthly)	19 December 2020	Semi-final non-qualifiers special	Various	"Hear Them Calling"	14th (Semi-final 1, 2016)
2021 season	19 June 2021	1969	Madrid	"Vivo cantando"	Winner (out of 16)
2021 season	17 July 2021	1980	(Netherlands) The Hague	"What's Another Year"	Winner (out of 19)
2021 season	31 July 2021	2006 (HD re-broadcast)	(Greece) Athens	No voting	
2021 season	21 August 2021	1992	(Sweden) Malmö	"Rapsodia"	4th out of 23
2021 season	18 September 2021	1968	(United Kingdom) London	"La, la, la"	Winner (out of 17)
2021 season	16 October 2021	2012	(Azerbaijan) Baku	"Euphoria"	Winner (out of 26)
2021 season	20 November 2021	2004	(Turkey) Istanbul	"Wild Dances"	Winner (out of 24)
2026 season	18 April 2026	1967	(Austria) Vienna	No voting	
2026 season	25 April 2026	2015	(Austria) Vienna	No voting	
