= Svala =

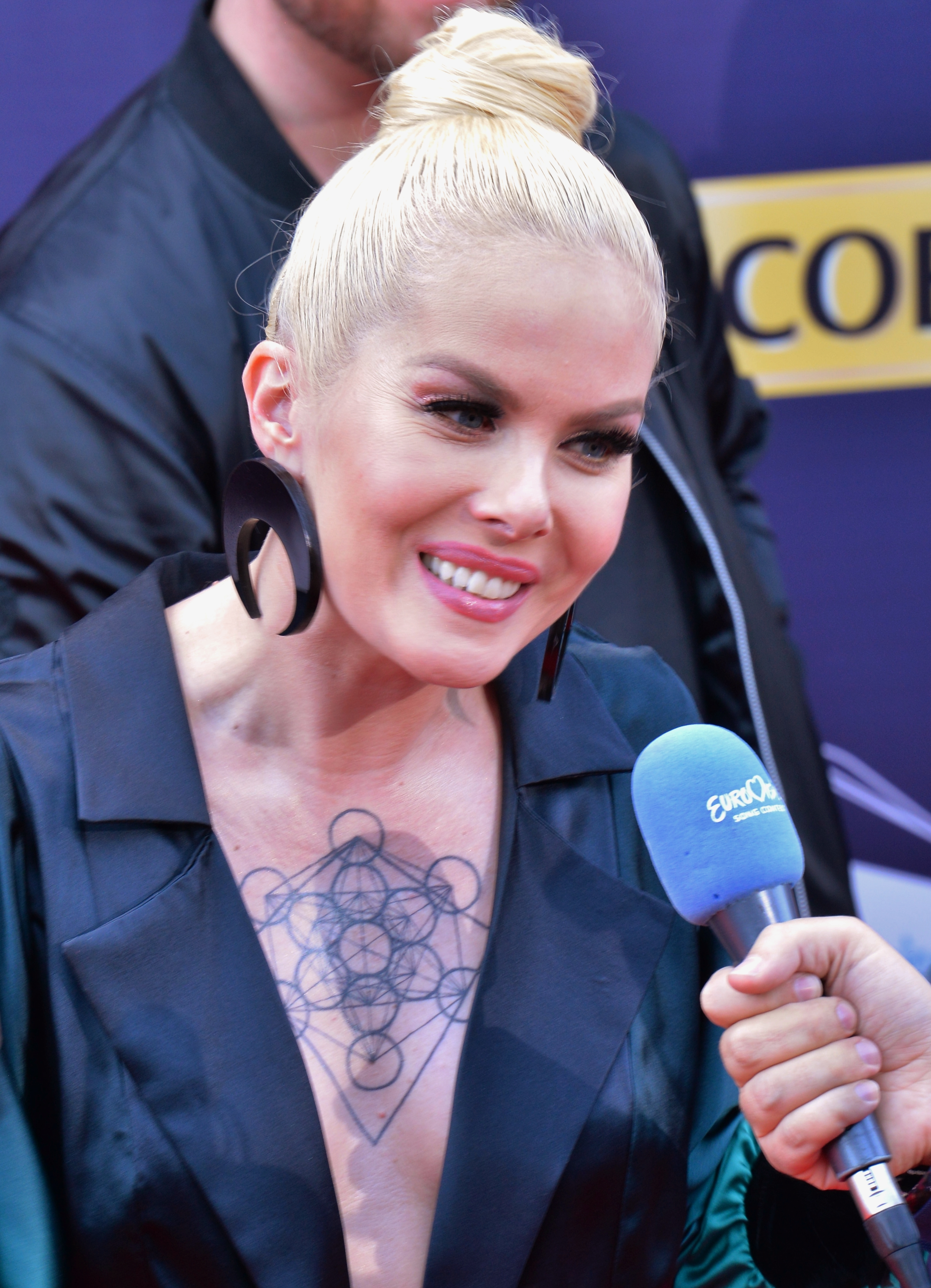
- Svala at the Eurovision Song Contest 2017 opening ceremony

Background information
- Also known as: Svala Björgvins; Kali
- Born: Svala Björgvinsdóttir; 8 February 1977 (age 49); Reykjavík, Iceland
- Genres: Pop; electronic
- Occupations: Singer; songwriter
- Years active: 1984–present
- Label: Priority Records

Svala Björgvinsdóttir (born 8 February 1977), professionally known as Svala, Svala Björgvins or Kali, is an Icelandic singer and songwriter. She rose to major fame with her song, "The Real Me" which was released on 12 June 2001 to Rhythmic contemporary radio, from her album of the same name. The singer briefly adopted the stage name "Kali" after joining the house band Steed Lord. She represented Iceland in the Eurovision Song Contest 2017 in Kyiv.

== Career ==
=== Early Fame (1984–1998) ===
Svala is the daughter of well-known Icelandic singer Björgvin Halldórsson. She started singing at a very young age, being her father's backing vocalist for one of his albums when she was seven years old. The singer also had her first number one hit in Iceland when she was nine years old, when she sang a Christmas duet with her father called "Fyrir Jól". Her second number one hit came out when she was 11 years old, with another Christmas hit called "Ég hlakka svo til". She would also be known for more Christmas songs that became hits in Iceland.

Svala studied ballet for 7 years with the Icelandic National Theatre Ballet. While studying ballet she was also writing music with her high school band.

When Svala was 16 years old she formed the band Scope with two Icelandic DJs and a producer. Their music was very influenced by UK house and disco. Svala and Scope released a cover of the song "Was That All It Was" in the mid 90s which became a dance anthem and a number 1 hit in Iceland. Svala was quickly signed to one of the biggest record labels in Iceland, Skifan Records, and after releasing a few songs with Scope, Svala left to join the Icelandic indie dance funk band Bubbleflies. She wrote a few songs with Bubbleflies and toured all over Iceland performing originals and soul and funk cover songs by Stevie Wonder and Sly and The Family Stone and also releasing a few songs like "I Betcha" which charted on Icelandic radio.

=== Priority Records (1999–2002) ===
When Svala was 18 years old she started writing and recording with the Scottish producer Ian Morrow. She was attending college in Iceland but was traveling back and forth to London and Glasgow to write and record music for her debut solo album. In 1999, Svala signed a six-album deal with EMI and Priority Records in North America. The record deal was one of the biggest deals ever made with an Icelandic recording artist. After signing she moved to Los Angeles in 2000 and started writing with some of the biggest hit-makers in the music business at that time. Her debut album The Real Me was released in the fall of 2001 with the title single "The Real Me" which charted on the Billboard top 40 singles chart. After 9/11 happened Priority Records struggled to stay alive and in 2002 Priority Records was bought by Capitol Records and Svala and all the other artists on the label transferred over to Capitol Records. After Svala left Priority Records her album The Real Me became a platinum selling album in Iceland and was also very well received in Germany, Spain and Japan.

=== Independent Projects (2005–2009) ===
The singer returned to Iceland and started writing and recording for her next solo album The Bird Of Freedom which was released in 2005. It was produced by Svala herself and her father. Svala co-wrote with songwriters from the UK, Scotland and Germany. The album went Gold in Iceland and gave Svala the opportunity to show her writing and producing skills.

On 8 February 2006 Svala, together with her husband-to-be Einar "Mega" Egilsson and his younger brother Edvard "Eddie" Egilsson, formed the electronic band Steed Lord. After a few shows in Iceland and with major buzz on MySpace, Steed Lord was touring all over Europe and North America and being featured on high-profile blogs, magazines, college radio and mixtapes by DJs in the US. Recognized for their soulful-beat-heavy dance music and very fashionable style, Steed Lord joined the nu-rave wave. They started to tour more and were remixed by Crookers, DJ Mehdi and Jack Beats. In 2006 Steed Lord became WeSC Activists, joining the Swedish clothing brand for all their campaigns. In 2007 they were approached by H&M to design a clothing line which was sold in 52 stores in over 100 countries around the world.

On 9 April 2008 the band was on their way to the airport in Iceland to go touring in Scandinavia when they had an almost fatal car crash on the icy road in Iceland. Svala's father in-law was driving the car when another car from the opposite direction lost control and hit them straight on in a head-on collision. Svala suffered broken bones and serious internal injuries. After recovering from the accident Steed Lord joined Chromeo on their US tour.

Svala moved to Los Angeles in the summer of 2009. Their music has been featured numerous times on TV shows such as So You Think You Can Dance and Keeping Up With The Kardashians. Steed Lord was hired by brands and companies such as The Standard Hotel and Universal Music Australia to direct and style music videos and brand based content.

=== Recent endeavours (2015–present) ===
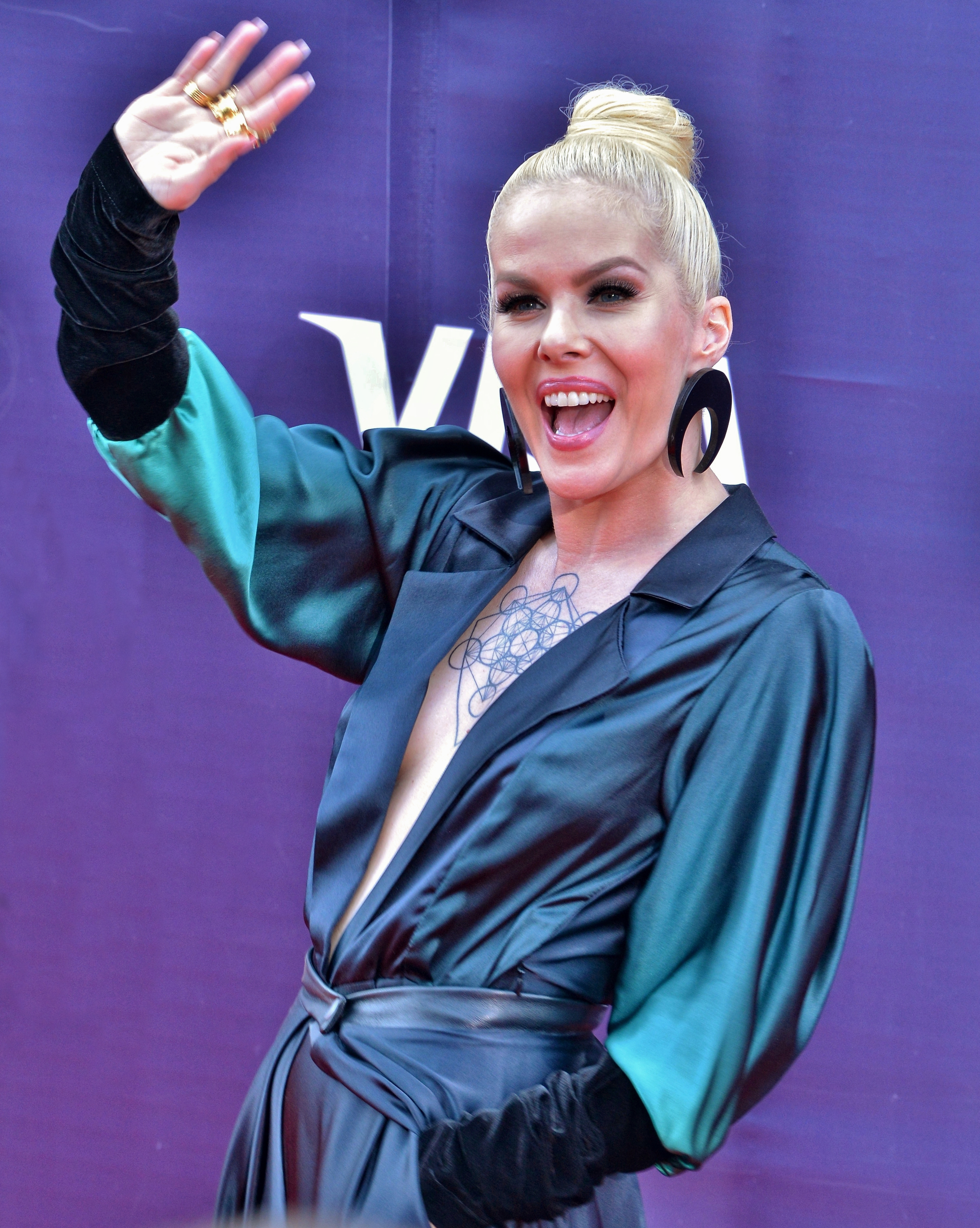
Svala at the Eurovision Song Contest 2017 opening ceremony

Svala took a break from music and moved back to Iceland with her husband. In 2015 Svala joined the franchise "The Voice" in Iceland as one of the four judges. Sixty singers were selected to participate in the Icelandic version of the show, which was aired in the autumn of 2015. The Voice is one of the most popular talent competitions in the world, with over 500 million viewers, and the first edition of the Iceland version of the franchise was said to have been watched by 30% of the population. In early 2016 Svala formed the duo BLISSFUL with her husband and later in 2016 they released their first single "Elevate" which has got over 230,000 plays on Spotify. On 24 August 2017, the band released their second single "Make It Better".

On 11 March 2017, she won the Icelandic national selection for the Eurovision Song Contest with her song “Paper,” which she wrote with Einar Egilsson, Lester Mendez and Lily Elise. She performed in the first semi-final of the contest, which took place on 9 May. She failed to qualify for the final.

In July 2018, she was featured on the track "Ekkert Drama" with Reykjavíkurdætur. Svala then released "For the Night" and "Karma" under Sony Denmark, as she signed a distribution deal with them in 2018. In December 2018, Svala was featured on the track "Sex" with Baggalútur. On 26 January 2019, it was announced that Svala was returning to Söngvakeppnin as a songwriter with the song "What Are You Waiting For".

== Discography ==
=== Studio albums ===
Title	Details
The Real Me	Released: 2 July 2001; Label: Priority Records; Format: Digital download, CD
Birds Of Freedom	Released: 2005; Label: Priority Records; Format: Digital download, CD
Truth Serum - Steed Lord	Released: 2008; Label: New Crack City Records; Format: Digital download, CD
The Truth Serum Remix Project - Steed Lord	Released: 2009; Label: New Crack City Records; Format: Digital download, CD
Heart II Heart - Steed Lord	Released: 2011; Label: New Crack City Records; Format: Digital download, CD
The Propechy Part 1 - Steed Lord	Released: 2012; Label: New Crack City Records; Format: Digital download, CD

=== Singles ===
Title	Year	Peak chart positions		Album
Title	Year	ICE	US Sales	Album
"Ég ætla að skreyta jólatré"	1985	—	—	Non-album singles
"Fyrir jól"	1987	—	—	Non-album singles
"Ég hlakka svo til"	1989	—	—	Non-album singles
"Was It All It Was - Scope"	1994	—	—	Non-album singles
"In The Arms Of Love - Scope"	1994	—	—	Non-album singles
"Hot Shot - Scope"	1995	—	—	Non-album singles
"Þú og ég og jól"	1997	—	—	Non-album singles
"On a Bus To St. Cloud"	1998	—	—	Non-album singles
"The Real Me"	2001	—	39	The Real Me
"Ég veit það"	2017	12	—	Non-album singles
"Paper"	2017	1	—	Non-album singles
"For The Night"	2018	—	—	Non-album singles
"Karma"	2018	—	—	Non-album singles
"Ein Í Nótt" (with Ingi Bauer)	2023	—	—	Non-album singles
"—" denotes a recording that did not chart or was not released in that territory.

Awards and achievements
Preceded by Greta Salóme with "Hear Them Calling"	Iceland in the Eurovision Song Contest; 2017	Succeeded by Ari Ólafsson with "Our Choice"
