= Greta Salóme Stefánsdóttir =

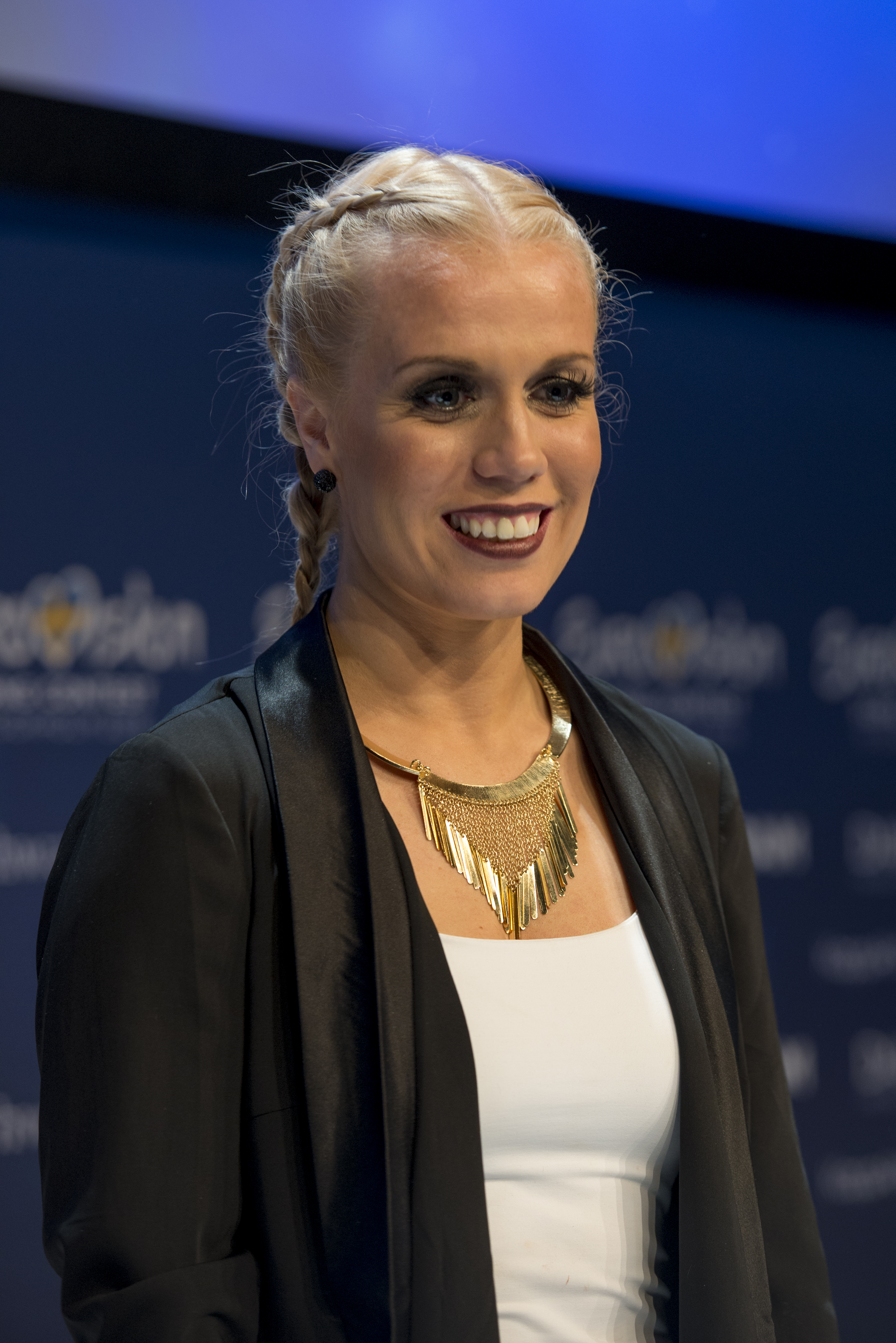
- Stefánsdóttir in 2016

Background information
- Also known as: Greta Salóme
- Born: 11 November 1986 (age 39); Mosfellsbær, Iceland
- Genres: Pop; soul; folk
- Occupations: Singer; songwriter; violinist
- Instruments: Vocals; violin
- Label: Hands Up Music

Greta Salóme Stefánsdóttir (Icelandic pronunciation: [ˈkrɛːta ˈsaːloumɛ ˈstɛːvaunsˌtouʰtɪr̥]; born 11 November 1986), known outside Iceland simply as Greta Salóme, is an Icelandic singer, songwriter, and violinist in the Iceland Symphony Orchestra. She represented Iceland in the Eurovision Song Contest 2012 in Baku, Azerbaijan, in a duet with singer Jónsi with the song "Never Forget". They qualified from the first semi-final into the Eurovision final and eventually finished in 20th place with 46 points. She represented Iceland again, this time as a soloist, in the Eurovision Song Contest 2016 with the song "Hear Them Calling".

== Career ==
Greta released her first album, titled In the Silence, on 16 November 2012. The album contains her Eurovision song "Never Forget", in both the English and the Icelandic version ("Mundu Eftir Mér"). In August 2012 she released Everything Around Me. It was announced that Greta was among the list of participants in Iceland's selection for Eurovision 2016 with the song "Raddirnar". She qualified from the first semi-final to participate in the final of the selection process. Her song was changed to English for the final, under the title "Hear Them Calling"; she won the national final. She represented Iceland performing the song in the first semi-final of Eurovision on 10 May 2016 placing fourteenth with 51 points. Recently, she had been finishing what will be her second studio album featuring her most recent singles. She also wrote the song "Crazy", which was performed by Raya and participated in UK's national selection for Eurovision Song Contest 2018

== Discography ==
=== Studio albums ===
Title	Details
In the Silence	Released: 16 November 2012; Label: Hands Up Music; Format: Digital download, CD

=== Singles ===
Title	Year	Peak chart positions		Album
Title	Year	ICE	BEL (Vl)	Album
"Never Forget" (with Jónsi)	2012	2	—^{[A]}	In the Silence
"Fleyið"	2015	—	—	TBA
"Raddirnar"^{[B]}	2016	3	—	TBA
"Hear Them Calling"	2016	1	—	TBA
"Row"	2016	—	—	TBA
"Running Out of Time"	2016	—	—	TBA
"My Blues"	2017	4	—	TBA
"Wildfire"	2018	9	—	TBA
"—" denotes a single that did not chart or was not released.

Preceded by Sigurjón's Friends with "Coming Home"	Iceland in the Eurovision Song Contest (with Jónsi); 2012	Succeeded by Eythor Ingi with "Ég á líf"
Preceded by María Ólafsdóttir with "Unbroken"	Iceland in the Eurovision Song Contest; 2016	Succeeded by Svala with "Paper"
