= María Ólafsdóttir =

Icelandic singer

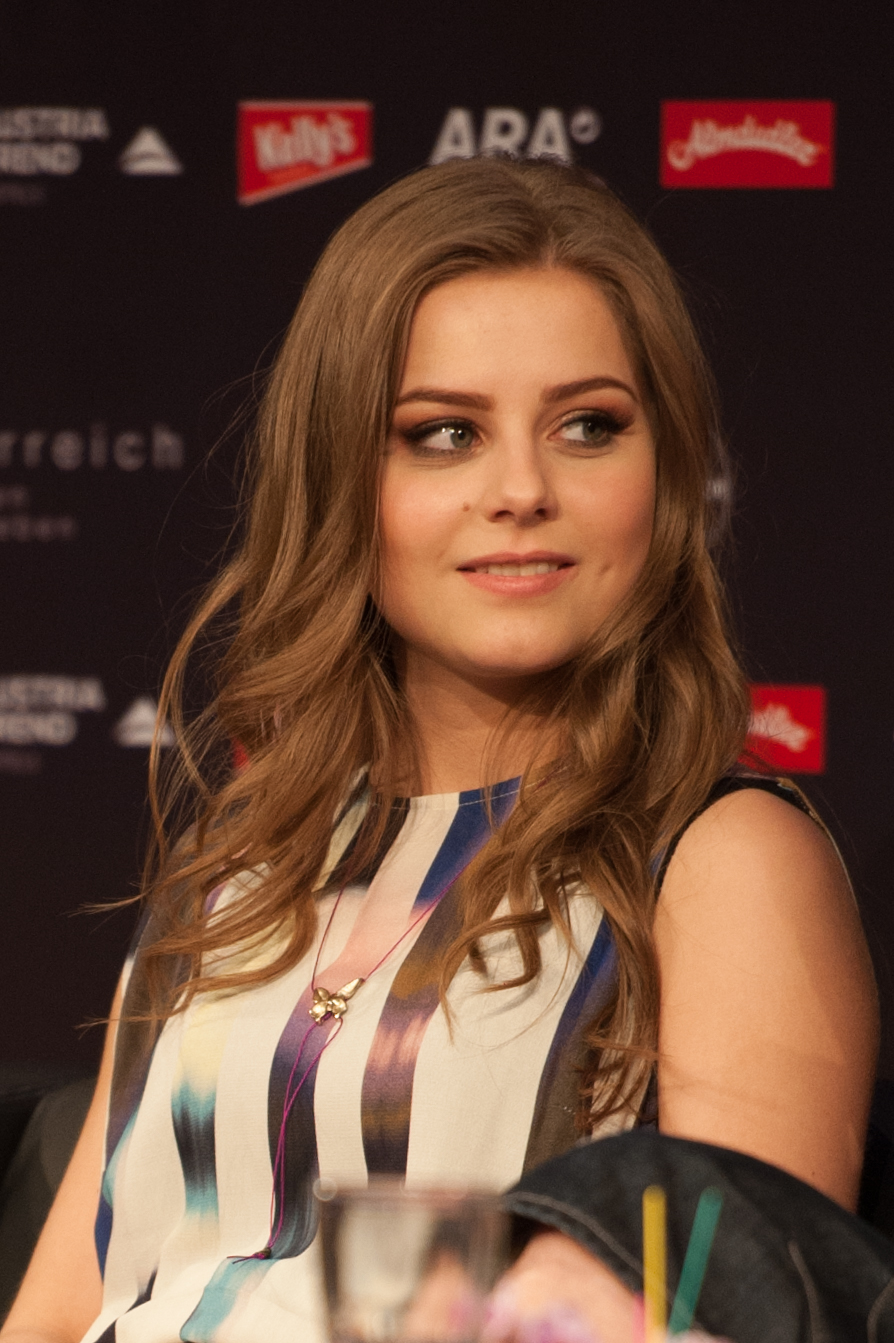
- María at the Eurovision Song Contest 2015

Background information
- Also known as: María Ólafs
- Born: María Ólafsdóttir; 2 February 1993 (age 33); Blönduós, Iceland
- Genres: Pop
- Occupations: Singer; musician; actress
- Instruments: Vocals; ukulele
- Website: mariaolafs.is

María Ólafsdóttir (born 2 February 1993), known outside Iceland as María Ólafs, is an Icelandic singer, musician, and actress. She represented Iceland in the Eurovision Song Contest 2015 with the song "Unbroken", but failed to qualify for the final.

== Discography ==
=== EPs ===
| Title | Details | Peak chart positions |
| Title | Details | ICE |
|---|---|---|
| Unbroken | Released: 16 May 2015; Label: StopWaitGo; Format: Digital download | — |

=== Singles ===
==== As lead artist ====
| Title | Year | Peak chart positions | Album |
| Title | Year | ICE | Album |
|---|---|---|---|
| "Lítil skref" | 2015 | 2 | Non-album single |
| "Unbroken" | 2015 | 1 | Unbroken |
| "Stronger" | 2015 | — | Non-album singles |
| "Baby Take The Wheel" | 2016 | — | Non-album singles |

==== As featured artist ====
| Title | Year | Peak chart positions | Album |
| Title | Year | ICE | Album |
|---|---|---|---|
| "Hold My Hand" (September featuring Maria Olafs) | 2016 | — | Non-album single |

== See also ==
- Iceland in the Eurovision Song Contest 2015

Awards and achievements
| Preceded by Pollapönk with "No Prejudice" | Iceland in the Eurovision Song Contest; 2015 | Succeeded by Greta Salóme with "Hear Them Calling" |
