= Cyprus in the Eurovision Song Contest 2016 =

- Eurovision Song Contest 2016
- Participating broadcaster: Cyprus Broadcasting Corporation (CyBC)
- Country: Cyprus
- Selection process: Internal selection
- Announcement date: Artist: 4 November 2015; Song: 22 February 2016

Competing entry
- Song: "Alter Ego"
- Artist: Minus One
- Songwriters: Minus One; Thomas G:son

Placement
- Semi-final result: Qualified (8th, 164 points)
- Final result: 21st, 96 points

Participation chronology

Cyprus was represented at the Eurovision Song Contest 2016 with the song "Alter Ego" written by Minus One and Thomas G:son. The song was performed by the band Minus One, which was selected by the Cypriot broadcaster Cyprus Broadcasting Corporation (CyBC) in November 2015 to represent Cyprus at the 2016 contest in Stockholm, Sweden. The Cypriot song, "Alter Ego", was presented to the public on 22 February 2016.

Cyprus was drawn to compete in the first semi-final of the Eurovision Song Contest which took place on 10 May 2016. Performing 11th during the show, "Alter Ego" was announced among the top 10 entries of the first semi-final and therefore qualified to compete in the final on 14 May. It was later revealed that Cyprus placed eighth out of the 18 participating countries in the semi-final with 164 points. In the final, Cyprus performed 14th and placed 21st out of the 26 participating countries, scoring 96 points.

== Background ==
Prior to the 2016 contest, Cyprus had participated in the Eurovision Song Contest thirty-two times since their debut in 1981. The nation's highest placing in the contest was fifth, which they achieved three times: in 1982 with the song "Mono i agapi" performed by Anna Vissi, in 1997 with "Mana mou" performed by Hara and Andreas Constantinou, and 2004 with "Stronger Every Minute" performed by Lisa Andreas. Following the introduction of semi-finals for the 2004 contest, Cyprus had featured in five finals. Cyprus' least successful result in the final has been last place, which they achieved in 1986 with the song "Tora zo" performed by Elpida. After returning to the contest in 2015 following their one-year withdrawal from the 2014 due to the 2012–13 Cypriot financial crisis and the broadcaster's budget restrictions, Cyprus managed to qualify to the final and place twenty-second with the song "One Thing I Should Have Done" performed by John Karayiannis.

The Cypriot national broadcaster, Cyprus Broadcasting Corporation (CyBC), broadcasts the event within Cyprus and organises the selection process for the nation's entry. CyBC confirmed their intentions to participate at the 2016 Eurovision Song Contest on 11 September 2015. Cyprus has used various methods to select the Cypriot entry in the past, such as internal selections and televised national finals to choose the performer, song or both to compete at Eurovision. In 2015, the broadcaster organised the national final Eurovision Song Project, which featured 54 songs competing in a nine-week-long process resulting in the selection of the Cypriot entry through the combination of public televoting and the votes from an expert jury. However, CyBC opted to select the 2016 Cypriot entry via an internal selection, a method which was last used by the broadcaster in 2013.

== Before Eurovision ==
=== Internal selection ===
On 4 November 2015, CyBC announced that they had internally selected the band Minus One to represent Cyprus in Stockholm. Minus One previously attempted to represent Cyprus at the Eurovision Song Contest in 2015, placing third in the national final Eurovision Song Project with the song "Shine". In order to create their contest song, the band collaborated with Swedish composer Thomas G:son, who has written several Eurovision entries for various countries including the Swedish Eurovision Song Contest 2012 winning song "Euphoria".

Minus One recorded their Eurovision entry in January 2016 at the Nordic Sound Lab studios in Skara, Sweden together with Thomas G:son and Thomas Plec Johansson. The song, "Alter Ego", was presented to the public on 22 February 2016 during the CyBC evening news broadcast. The official preview video for the song, directed by Emilios Avraam, was released on the same day.

=== Promotion ===
Minus One made several appearances across Europe to specifically promote "Alter Ego" as the Cypriot Eurovision entry. On 3 April, Minus One performed during the Eurovision Pre-Party, which was held at the Izvestia Hall in Moscow, Russia and hosted by Dmitry Guberniev. On 9 April, Minus One performed during the Eurovision in Concert event which was held at the Melkweg venue in Amsterdam, Netherlands and hosted by Cornald Maas and Hera Björk. On 17 April, Minus One performed during the London Eurovision Party, which was held at the Café de Paris venue in London, United Kingdom and hosted by Nicki French and Paddy O'Connell.

In addition to their international appearances, Minus One performed "Alter Ego" on 26 March during their concert series at the DownTown Live venue in Nicosia and the band performed at the Fighting Cancer with Music fundraising event in support of The Cyprus Anticancer Society in Limassol on 24 April. Minus One performed a farewell concert prior to travelling to Stockholm at the DownTown Live venue on 30 April.

== At Eurovision ==
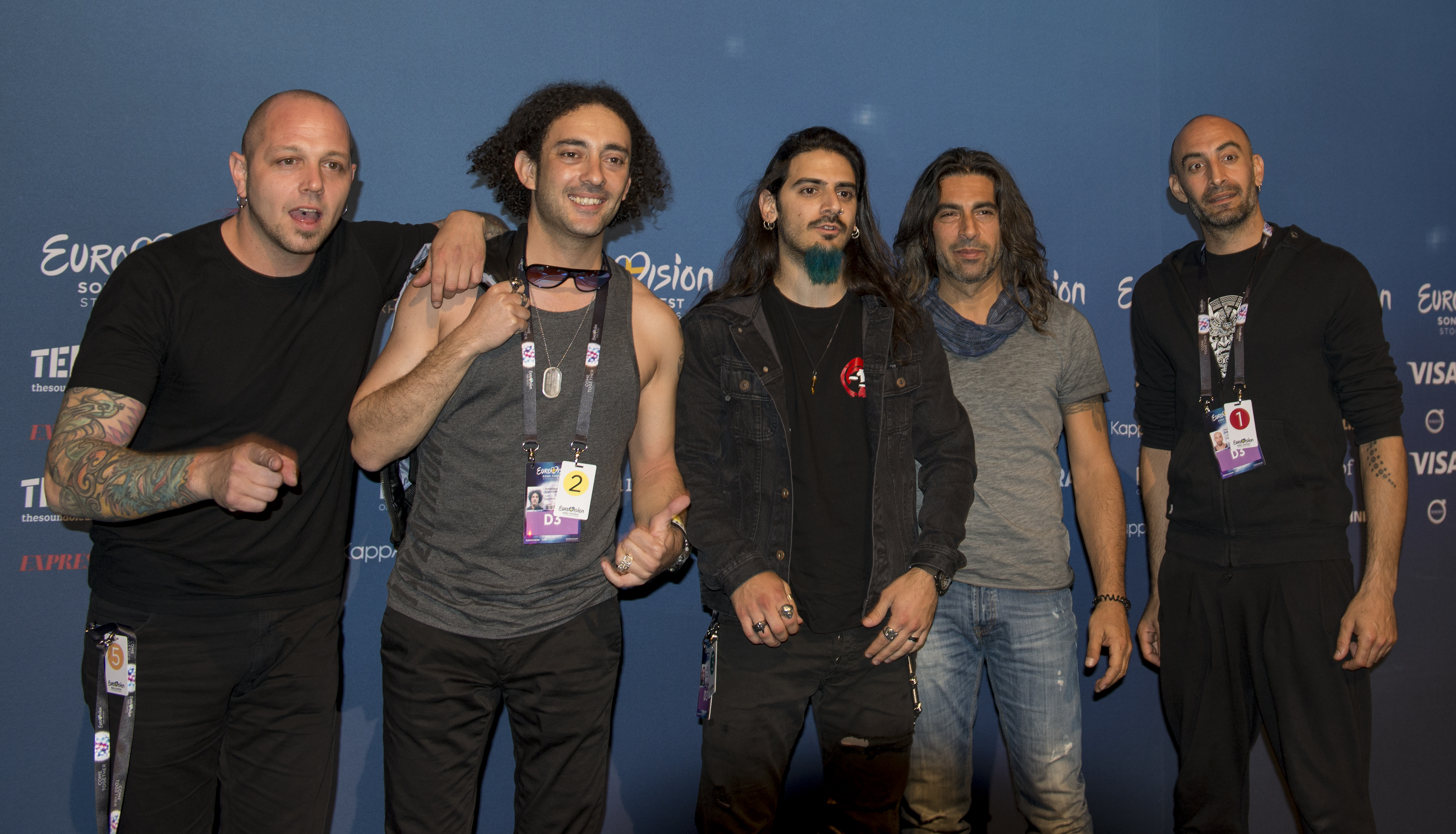
Minus One during a press meet and greet

The Eurovision Song Contest 2016 took place at Globe Arena in Stockholm, Sweden. It consisted of two semi-finals held on 10 and 12 May, respectively, and the final on 14 May 2016. According to Eurovision rules, all nations with the exceptions of the host country and the "Big Five", consisting of France, Germany, Italy, Spain and the United Kingdom, were required to qualify from one of two semi-finals in order to compete for the final; the top 10 countries from each semi-final progress to the final. The EBU split up the competing countries into six different pots based on voting patterns from previous contests, with the goal of reducing the amount of neighbourly voting. On 25 January 2016, an allocation draw was held which placed each country into one of the two semi-finals and determined which half of the show they would perform in. Cyprus was placed into the first semi-final, to be held on 10 May 2016, and was scheduled to perform in the second half of the show. Once all the competing songs for the 2016 contest had been released, the running order for the semi-finals was decided by the shows' producers rather than through another draw, so that similar songs were not placed next to each other. Cyprus was set to perform 11th, following the entry from the Czech Republic and before the entry from Austria. The two semi-finals and the final were broadcast in Cyprus on RIK 1, RIK SAT, RIK HD and Trito Programma with commentary by Melina Karageorgiou.

=== Performances ===
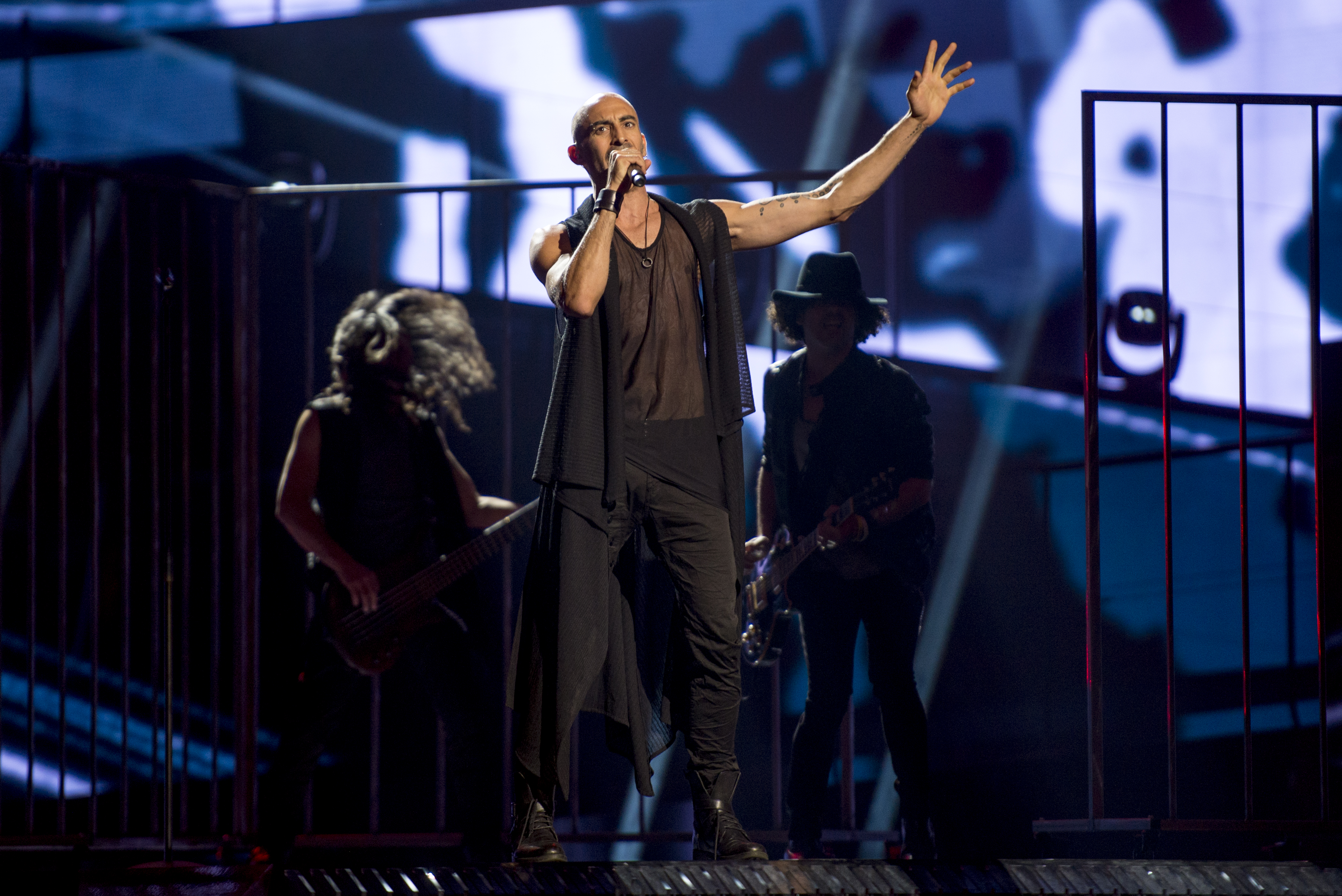
Minus One during a rehearsal before the first semi-final

Minus One took part in technical rehearsals on 3 and 6 May, followed by dress rehearsals on 9 and 10 May. This included the jury show on 9 May where the professional juries of each country watched and voted on the competing entries. Heading into the first semi-final, CNN reported that bookmakers and polls ranked the entry 21st out of the 42 entries.

The Cypriot performance featured the band members of Minus One dressed in black with all of the musicians in large cages and the lead singer, François Micheletto, in the centre of the set-up with a microphone stand. The stage and LED screens displayed white lighting effects and images of wolves. The artistic director of the performance was Sacha Jean-Baptiste. Minus One were joined by one backing vocalist: Lars Säfsund. At the end of the show, Cyprus was announced as having finished in the top 10 and subsequently qualifying for the grand final. It was later revealed that Cyprus placed eighth in the semi-final, receiving a total of 164 points: 93 points from the televoting and 71 points from the juries.

Shortly after the first semi-final, a winners' press conference was held for the ten qualifying countries. As part of this press conference, the qualifying artists took part in a draw to determine which half of the grand final they would subsequently participate in. This draw was done in the order the countries appeared in the semi-final running order. Cyprus was drawn to compete in the second half. Following this draw, the shows' producers decided upon the running order of the final, as they had done for the semi-finals. Cyprus was subsequently placed to perform 14th, following the entry from Australia and before the entry from Serbia. Minus One once again took part in dress rehearsals on 13 and 14 May before the final, including the jury final where the professional juries cast their final votes before the live show. Minus One performed a repeat of their semi-final performance during the final on 14 May. Cyprus placed twenty-first in the final, scoring 96 points: 53 points from the televoting and 43 points from the juries.

=== Voting ===
Voting during the three shows was conducted under a new system that involved each country now awarding two sets of points from 1–8, 10 and 12: one from their professional jury and the other from televoting. Each nation's jury consisted of five music industry professionals who are citizens of the country they represent, with their names published before the contest to ensure transparency. This jury judged each entry based on: vocal capacity; the stage performance; the song's composition and originality; and the overall impression by the act. In addition, no member of a national jury was permitted to be related in any way to any of the competing acts in such a way that they cannot vote impartially and independently. The individual rankings of each jury member as well as the nation's televoting results were released shortly after the grand final. The Cypriot jury consisted of Poly Roussou, Nicos Evangelou, Silia Ioannidou, Kypros Karaviotis and Christina Tselepou. The Cypriot spokesperson, who announced the top 12-point score awarded by the Cypriot jury during the final, was Loukas Hamatsos. Below is a breakdown of points awarded to Cyprus and awarded by the country in the first semi-final and grand final of the contest, and the breakdown of the jury voting and televoting conducted during the two shows.

==== Points awarded to Cyprus ====
Points awarded to Cyprus (Semi-final 1)
| Score | Televote | Jury |
|---|---|---|
| 12 points | Greece | |
| 10 points | | Croatia; Estonia; Netherlands |
| 8 points | Armenia; Russia | Greece; Malta; San Marino |
| 7 points | Finland; Hungary | Moldova |
| 6 points | Estonia; Malta | |
| 5 points | France; Iceland; Montenegro; San Marino | |
| 4 points | Czech Republic | France |
| 3 points | Netherlands; Spain | |
| 2 points | Austria; Bosnia and Herzegovina; Croatia; Sweden | Hungary |
| 1 point | Azerbaijan | Czech Republic; Iceland; Spain; Sweden |

Points awarded to Cyprus (Final)
| Score | Televote | Jury |
|---|---|---|
| 12 points | Greece | |
| 10 points | | |
| 8 points | | Greece |
| 7 points | Bulgaria; Russia | United Kingdom |
| 6 points | Armenia; Italy | Armenia |
| 5 points | Hungary | Malta; San Marino |
| 4 points | | Estonia; Russia |
| 3 points | Estonia; Serbia | |
| 2 points | United Kingdom | Moldova |
| 1 point | Finland; Poland | Croatia; Italy |

==== Points awarded by Cyprus ====
Points awarded by Cyprus (Semi-final 1)
| Score | Televote | Jury |
|---|---|---|
| 12 points | Greece | Russia |
| 10 points | Russia | Armenia |
| 8 points | Azerbaijan | Malta |
| 7 points | Armenia | Croatia |
| 6 points | Hungary | Hungary |
| 5 points | Malta | Czech Republic |
| 4 points | Netherlands | Azerbaijan |
| 3 points | Austria | Greece |
| 2 points | Moldova | Austria |
| 1 point | Croatia | Iceland |

Points awarded by Cyprus (Final)
| Score | Televote | Jury |
|---|---|---|
| 12 points | Bulgaria | Russia |
| 10 points | Russia | Australia |
| 8 points | Armenia | Armenia |
| 7 points | Ukraine | France |
| 6 points | France | Malta |
| 5 points | Australia | Israel |
| 4 points | Hungary | Hungary |
| 3 points | Lithuania | Italy |
| 2 points | Poland | Azerbaijan |
| 1 point | Sweden | Croatia |

==== Detailed voting results ====
The following five members composed the Cypriot jury:

- Poly Roussou (jury chairperson) – pianist, music teacher, assistant headmistress
- Nicos Evangelou – music teacher, pianist
- Silia Ioannidou – journalist, radio producer
- Kypros Karaviotis – DJ, radio producer
- Christina Tselepou – vocal music coach, live performance singer

Detailed voting results from Cyprus (Semi-final 1)
| R/O | Country | Jury | | | | | | | Televote | |
| R/O | Country | P. Roussou | N. Evangelou | S. Ioannidou | K. Karaviotis | C. Tselepou | Rank | Points | Rank | Points |
|---|---|---|---|---|---|---|---|---|---|---|
| 01 | Finland | 14 | 9 | 10 | 13 | 8 | 12 | | 11 | |
| 02 | Greece | 15 | 4 | 4 | 17 | 5 | 8 | 3 | 1 | 12 |
| 03 | Moldova | 10 | 14 | 16 | 10 | 14 | 15 | | 9 | 2 |
| 04 | Hungary | 12 | 2 | 6 | 12 | 3 | 5 | 6 | 5 | 6 |
| 05 | Croatia | 4 | 7 | 7 | 5 | 7 | 4 | 7 | 10 | 1 |
| 06 | Netherlands | 16 | 11 | 8 | 14 | 12 | 14 | | 7 | 4 |
| 07 | Armenia | 6 | 1 | 5 | 6 | 1 | 2 | 10 | 4 | 7 |
| 08 | San Marino | 17 | 16 | 17 | 2 | 17 | 16 | | 12 | |
| 09 | Russia | 1 | 3 | 1 | 1 | 2 | 1 | 12 | 2 | 10 |
| 10 | Czech Republic | 8 | 6 | 14 | 3 | 6 | 6 | 5 | 14 | |
| 11 | Cyprus | | | | | | | | | |
| 12 | Austria | 13 | 8 | 9 | 11 | 9 | 9 | 2 | 8 | 3 |
| 13 | Estonia | 11 | 12 | 3 | 15 | 11 | 11 | | 16 | |
| 14 | Azerbaijan | 2 | 10 | 12 | 4 | 13 | 7 | 4 | 3 | 8 |
| 15 | Montenegro | 9 | 17 | 13 | 16 | 15 | 17 | | 17 | |
| 16 | Iceland | 7 | 13 | 11 | 9 | 10 | 10 | 1 | 13 | |
| 17 | Bosnia and Herzegovina | 3 | 15 | 15 | 7 | 16 | 13 | | 15 | |
| 18 | Malta | 5 | 5 | 2 | 8 | 4 | 3 | 8 | 6 | 5 |

Detailed voting results from Cyprus (Final)
| R/O | Country | Jury | | | | | | | Televote | |
| R/O | Country | P. Roussou | N. Evangelou | S. Ioannidou | K. Karaviotis | C. Tselepou | Rank | Points | Rank | Points |
|---|---|---|---|---|---|---|---|---|---|---|
| 01 | Belgium | 16 | 19 | 22 | 22 | 18 | 23 | | 17 | |
| 02 | Czech Republic | 10 | 13 | 19 | 13 | 8 | 11 | | 24 | |
| 03 | Netherlands | 23 | 14 | 18 | 23 | 24 | 24 | | 20 | |
| 04 | Azerbaijan | 6 | 8 | 16 | 6 | 22 | 9 | 2 | 11 | |
| 05 | Hungary | 19 | 7 | 5 | 15 | 6 | 7 | 4 | 7 | 4 |
| 06 | Italy | 11 | 10 | 12 | 9 | 11 | 8 | 3 | 12 | |
| 07 | Israel | 7 | 11 | 6 | 4 | 9 | 6 | 5 | 15 | |
| 08 | Bulgaria | 15 | 12 | 24 | 21 | 12 | 17 | | 1 | 12 |
| 09 | Sweden | 13 | 15 | 7 | 16 | 13 | 14 | | 10 | 1 |
| 10 | Germany | 9 | 21 | 23 | 17 | 20 | 20 | | 22 | |
| 11 | France | 14 | 6 | 2 | 5 | 5 | 4 | 7 | 5 | 6 |
| 12 | Poland | 24 | 24 | 25 | 25 | 25 | 25 | | 9 | 2 |
| 13 | Australia | 2 | 3 | 3 | 2 | 3 | 2 | 10 | 6 | 5 |
| 14 | Cyprus | | | | | | | | | |
| 15 | Serbia | 5 | 16 | 8 | 24 | 10 | 13 | | 16 | |
| 16 | Lithuania | 18 | 17 | 10 | 3 | 17 | 15 | | 8 | 3 |
| 17 | Croatia | 3 | 18 | 15 | 11 | 15 | 10 | 1 | 25 | |
| 18 | Russia | 1 | 1 | 1 | 1 | 1 | 1 | 12 | 2 | 10 |
| 19 | Spain | 21 | 23 | 9 | 14 | 14 | 16 | | 21 | |
| 20 | Latvia | 20 | 5 | 13 | 18 | 7 | 12 | | 14 | |
| 21 | Ukraine | 22 | 4 | 20 | 19 | 19 | 18 | | 4 | 7 |
| 22 | Malta | 8 | 9 | 4 | 7 | 4 | 5 | 6 | 18 | |
| 23 | Georgia | 25 | 22 | 14 | 12 | 21 | 22 | | 23 | |
| 24 | Austria | 17 | 25 | 21 | 10 | 16 | 19 | | 13 | |
| 25 | United Kingdom | 12 | 20 | 17 | 20 | 23 | 21 | | 19 | |
| 26 | Armenia | 4 | 2 | 11 | 8 | 2 | 3 | 8 | 3 | 8 |
