= San Marino in the Eurovision Song Contest 2016 =

- Eurovision Song Contest 2016
- Participating broadcaster: San Marino RTV (SMRTV)
- Country: San Marino
- Selection process: Internal selection
- Announcement date: Artist: 12 January 2016; Song: 9 March 2016

Competing entry
- Song: "I Didn't Know"
- Artist: Serhat
- Songwriters: Olcayto Ahmet Tuğsuz; Nektarios Tyrakis

Placement
- Semi-final result: Failed to qualify (12th)

Participation chronology

San Marino was represented at the Eurovision Song Contest 2016, held in Stockholm, Sweden. The Sammarinese national broadcaster San Marino RTV (SMRTV) internally selected Turkish singer Serhat with "I Didn't Know" to represent the nation in the contest. The song was written by Olcayto Ahmet Tuğsuz and Nektarios Tyrakis and was presented to the public on 9 March 2016 alongside its music video. While initially a ballad version had been selected, SMRTV subsequently opted to use the disco version of the song for the contest based on feedback from the public. To promote the entry, Serhat embarked on a promotional tour across Europe in the lead up the Eurovision Song Contest. San Marino performed eighth in the first semi-final, held on 10 May 2016, and placed 12th with 68 points, failing to qualify for the final.

== Background ==
Prior to the 2016 contest, San Marino had participated in the Eurovision Song Contest six times since their first entry in 2008. The nation's debut entry in the 2008 contest, "Complice" performed by Miodio, failed to qualify for the final and placed last in the semi-final it competed in. San Marino subsequently did not participate in both the 2009 and 2010 contests, citing financial difficulties. They returned in 2011 with Italian singer Senit performing "Stand By", which also failed to take the nation to the final. From 2012 to 2014, San Marino sent Valentina Monetta to the contest on three consecutive occasions, which made her the first singer to participate in three consecutive contests since Udo Jürgens, who competed in 1964, 1965 and 1966 for Austria. Monetta's entries in 2012 ("The Social Network Song") and 2013 ("Crisalide (Vola)") also failed to qualify San Marino for the final; however, in 2014, she managed to bring the nation to the final for the first time with "Maybe", placing 24th. This marked their best placing to this point.

San Marino Head of Delegation Alessandro Capicchioni stated in an interview with Eurofestival News on 24 September 2015 that San Marino RTV (SMRTV) had submitted a preliminary application to take part in the Eurovision Song Contest 2016. He added that since San Marino does not organise a national final to select its entry, more effort is required of the broadcaster to choose a successful act. By 26 November 2015, the European Broadcasting Union (EBU) posted the final list of participants, which included San Marino.

== Before Eurovision ==
=== Internal selection ===
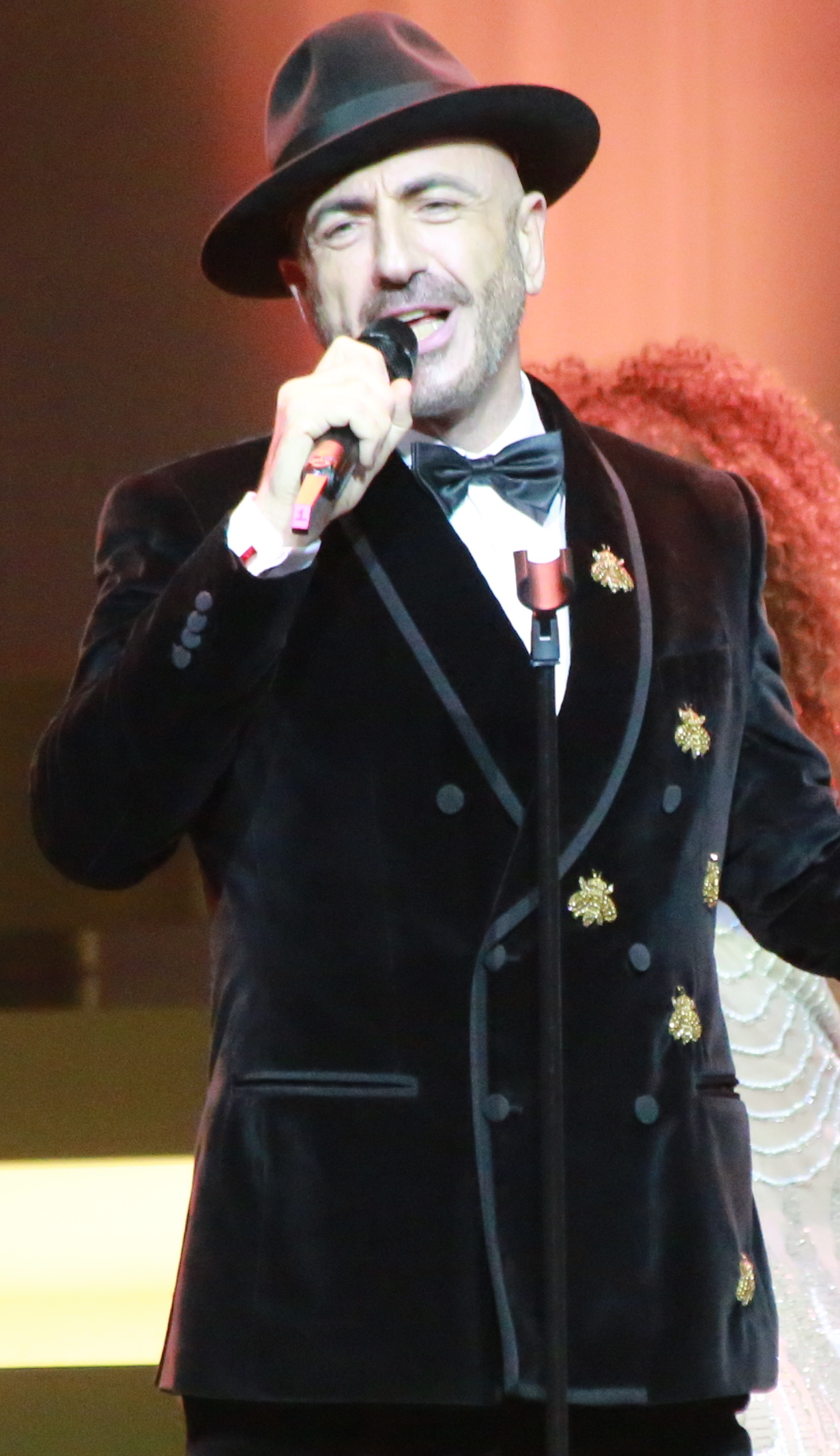
Turkish singer Serhat was internally selected by SMRTV to represent San Marino in the Eurovision Song Contest 2016.

On 12 January 2016, SMRTV held a press conference at their studio where they announced that they had internally selected Turkish singer Serhat to represent San Marino at the Eurovision Song Contest 2016. SMRTV Director Carlo Romeo and Capicchioni were also in attendance for the event. Serhat was selected to represent San Marino after the broadcaster received a proposal from the Italian agency 23 Music.

A press conference to reveal Serhat's song was held on 9 March 2016 at the InterContinental Le Grand Hotel in Paris. At the event, "I Didn't Know" was presented as the song to represent San Marino in the Eurovision Song Contest 2016. The song was composed by Olcayto Ahmet Tuğsuz with lyrics by Nektarios Tyrakis. Tuğsuz had previously composed two Eurovision entries for Turkey, "Hani?" (1982) and "Şarkım Sevgi Üstüne" (1987), while Tyrakis was the lyricist for "Shake It", the Greek entry in 2004, and "Love Me Tonight", the Belarusian entry in 2005. Tuğsuz and Tyrakis had previously written songs together, though they had never met in person, including while writing "I Didn't Know". The song was recorded at the Piste Rouge Studios in Brussels and was arranged by the French musician Cyril Orcel and Belgian-African musician Guy Waku. It was recorded in English, French and Italian. The lyricist for the Italian version, "Non ero io", was Mariella Nava while the lyricist for the French version, "Comment savoir", was Stéphane Laporte. The concept and creative director for the Sammarinese entry was Manfred Thierry Mugler.

=== Song changes ===
On 21 March 2016, the Sammarinese delegation announced that their request to change the official contest version of "I Didn't Know" had been approved by the Eurovision Song Contest Reference Group. The song was changed from the ballad version, which was originally presented on 9 March 2016, to the disco version, which was released earlier as part of the EP for the song. The decision was made in response to positive reactions that the disco version received on YouTube and social media. As part of the change, the disco version was also shortened to three minutes long.

"I think for any artist it is very important to listen to the expectations of the fans. [...] We're singing for fans at the Eurovision stage. Then why not sing the disco version? So, if Eurovision fans want to see my show this way, I'll do it."

— Serhat, "Interview by Rezo Mamsikashvili", Wiwibloggs

=== Promotion ===
To promote the entry, a music video for "I Didn't Know" was released as part of the song's presentation on 9 March 2016. Directed by Mugler, the video was filmed in Paris with a team of 37 people. Serhat also embarked on a promotional tour in the lead up the Eurovision Song Contest. For the tour, he appeared on television talk shows and radio shows in Azerbaijan, Georgia, Montenegro, Serbia, Bosnia and Herzegovina, Malta, Greece, Macedonia and Albania. Among his appearances, Serhat performed "I Didn't Know" during the E Channel programme Bravo Roula in Greece and during the TVM programme Xarabank in Malta. On 11 May 2016, Serhat took part in the first #wiwijam event organized by Wiwibloggs and held at the Hard Rock Cafe in Stockholm. The event included performances by 15 participants of the year's contest.

== At Eurovision ==
The Eurovision Song Contest 2016 took place at Globe Arena in Stockholm, Sweden. It consisted of two semi-finals held on 10 and 12 May, respectively, and the final on 14 May 2016. According to Eurovision rules, all nations with the exceptions of the host country and the "Big Five", consisting of France, Germany, Italy, Spain and the United Kingdom, were required to qualify from one of two semi-finals in order to compete for the final; the top 10 countries from each semi-final progress to the final. The EBU split up the competing countries into six different pots based on voting patterns from previous contests, with the goal of reducing the amount of neighbourly voting. On 25 January 2016, an allocation draw was held which placed each country into one of the two semi-finals, as well as which half of the show they would perform in. San Marino was placed into the first semi-final, to be held on 10 May 2016, and was scheduled to perform in the first half of the show. The draw was broadcast in San Marino and through SMRTV's website with Italian-language commentary by Eddy Anselmi and Capicchioni.

Once all the competing songs for the 2016 contest had been released, the running order for the semi-finals was decided by the shows' producers rather than through another draw, so that similar songs were not placed next to each other. San Marino was set to perform in position eight, following the entry from Armenia and preceding the entry from Russia. All three shows were broadcast in San Marino on San Marino RTV and Radio San Marino with commentary by Lia Fiorio and Gigi Restivo. Rapper Irol MC, the winner of SMRTV's Città di San Marino talent show, was the Sammarinese spokesperson who announced the nation's 12-point vote during the final.

=== Semi-final ===
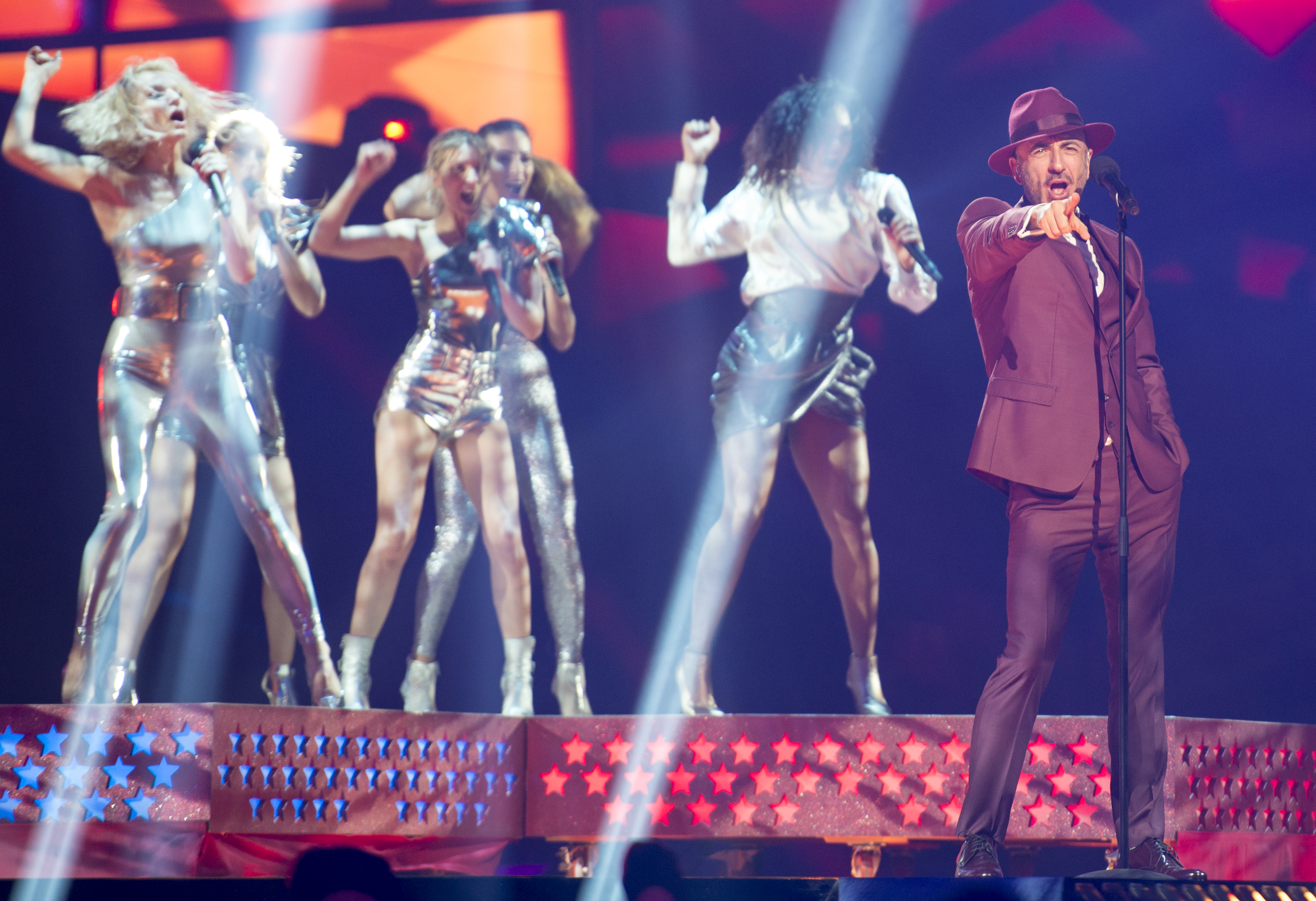
Serhat during a rehearsal before the first semi-final of the Eurovision Song Contest 2016.

Serhat took part in technical rehearsals on 2 and 6 May, followed by dress rehearsals on 9 and 10 May 2016. This included the jury show on 9 May where the professional juries of each country watched and voted on the competing entries.

The Sammarinese performance featured Serhat dressed in a burgundy crimson suit performing together with five female backing vocalists/dancers dressed in silver-coloured costumes. The stage presentation featured Serhat performing at floor level on the stage while the backing vocalists/dancers delivered a choreographed routine atop raised platforms. The LED screens projected disco and falling star designs with blue and red lighting. The five backing vocalists and dancers on stage with Serhat were Caroline Hauwel, Ellia Palazzi, EmilIe Weber, Jessica Fagniot and Ophelie Crispin. Artistic direction for the performance was guided by Mugler, who had also directed the music video.

At the end of the show, San Marino was not announced among the top 10 entries in the first semi-final and therefore failed to qualify to compete in the final. It was later revealed that San Marino placed 12th in the semi-final, receiving a total of 68 points: 49 points from the televoting and 19 points from the juries.

=== Voting ===
Voting during the three shows was conducted under a new system that involved each country now awarding two sets of points from 1–8, 10 and 12: one from their professional jury and the other from televoting. Each nation's jury consisted of five music industry professionals who are citizens of the country they represent, with their names published before the contest. This jury judged each entry based on: vocal capacity; the stage performance; the song's composition and originality; and the overall impression by the act. In addition, no member of a national jury was permitted to be connected in any way to any of the competing acts in such a way that they cannot vote impartially and independently. The individual rankings of each jury member as well as the nation's televoting results were released shortly after the final.

Below is a breakdown of points awarded to San Marino and awarded by San Marino in the first semi-final and the final of the contest, respectively, and the breakdown of the jury voting and televoting conducted during the two shows. In accordance with the new voting system, if no televote were available, the EBU would instead simulate a composite score for the nation using average televoting results from a pre-selected group of countries. As San Marino do not organise a televote due to their use of Italy's phone system and a small number of potential televoters, their televote results were obtained through this process.

==== Points awarded to San Marino ====
Points awarded to San Marino (Semi-final 1)
Score	Televote	Jury
12 points		
10 points	Azerbaijan	Bosnia and Herzegovina
8 points		
7 points		
6 points	Greece	Malta
5 points	Austria; Hungary; Malta	
4 points	Estonia; Moldova; Netherlands	
3 points	Finland	Azerbaijan
2 points	Montenegro	
1 point	Iceland	

==== Points awarded by San Marino ====
Points awarded by San Marino (Semi-final 1)
Score	Aggregated televote	Jury
12 points	Russia	Netherlands
10 points	Azerbaijan	Montenegro
8 points	Armenia	Cyprus
7 points	Hungary	Iceland
6 points	Netherlands	Azerbaijan
5 points	Cyprus	Malta
4 points	Bosnia and Herzegovina	Czech Republic
3 points	Austria	Russia
2 points	Czech Republic	Bosnia and Herzegovina
1 point	Iceland	Croatia

Points awarded by San Marino (Final)
Score	Aggregated televote	Jury
12 points	Ukraine	Ukraine
10 points	Russia	Italy
8 points	Lithuania	United Kingdom
7 points	Poland	Russia
6 points	Latvia	Georgia
5 points	Australia	Cyprus
4 points	Sweden	Netherlands
3 points	Bulgaria	Malta
2 points	Armenia	Hungary
1 point	Hungary	Austria

==== Detailed voting results ====
The following members comprised the Sammarinese jury:

- Leonardo Bollini – musician, guitarist
- Gea Gasperoni – pianist, teacher
- Monica Moroni – flute soloist, teacher
- Edoardo Monti (Oder) – musician, beat creator
- Carlo Chiaruzzi – audio engineer

Detailed voting results from San Marino (Semi-final 1)
R/O	Country	Jury							Aggregated televote	
R/O	Country	M. Moroni	L. Bollini	C. Chiaruzzi	G. Gasperoni	Oder	Rank	Points	Rank	Points
01	Finland	17	14	16	17	2	16		15	
02	Greece	11	7	15	1	17	14		16	
03	Moldova	13	12	14	9	6	15		13	
04	Hungary	10	11	9	8	10	12		4	7
05	Croatia	6	3	11	10	16	10	1	12	
06	Netherlands	1	1	3	4	5	1	12	5	6
07	Armenia	14	10	5	11	7	11		3	8
08	San Marino									
09	Russia	7	17	2	2	15	8	3	1	12
10	Czech Republic	15	2	1	16	8	7	4	9	2
11	Cyprus	5	8	6	3	11	3	8	6	5
12	Austria	9	4	10	14	14	13		8	3
13	Estonia	16	16	17	15	13	17		14	
14	Azerbaijan	2	13	12	7	4	5	6	2	10
15	Montenegro	4	9	4	6	9	2	10	17	
16	Iceland	8	6	7	13	3	4	7	10	1
17	Bosnia and Herzegovina	3	5	13	12	12	9	2	7	4
18	Malta	12	15	8	5	1	6	5	11	

Detailed voting results from San Marino (Final)
R/O	Country	Jury							Aggregated televote	
R/O	Country	M. Moroni	L. Bollini	C. Chiaruzzi	G. Gasperoni	Oder	Rank	Points	Rank	Points
01	Belgium	26	12	8	8	21	16		20	
02	Czech Republic	25	5	2	17	22	14		24	
03	Netherlands	18	2	3	2	23	7	4	17	
04	Azerbaijan	23	20	15	18	20	24		12	
05	Hungary	10	15	6	16	19	9	2	10	1
06	Italy	9	1	7	1	17	2	10	13	
07	Israel	12	14	17	15	24	21		21	
08	Bulgaria	16	24	19	3	16	17		8	3
09	Sweden	20	22	20	19	15	25		7	4
10	Germany	14	19	21	13	25	23		22	
11	France	8	16	22	5	18	13		14	
12	Poland	21	9	23	21	26	26		4	7
13	Australia	5	13	24	12	14	12		6	5
14	Cyprus	4	6	12	11	13	6	5	15	
15	Serbia	15	17	26	14	12	22		25	
16	Lithuania	7	26	14	24	11	20		3	8
17	Croatia	19	4	18	23	9	15		26	
18	Russia	2	23	4	4	10	4	7	2	10
19	Spain	6	21	9	22	8	11		19	
20	Latvia	24	25	13	9	7	19		5	6
21	Ukraine	3	3	1	6	1	1	12	1	12
22	Malta	22	18	10	7	6	8	3	23	
23	Georgia	1	8	11	20	4	5	6	18	
24	Austria	13	10	16	25	2	10	1	11	
25	United Kingdom	11	11	5	10	5	3	8	16	
26	Armenia	17	7	25	26	3	18		9	2
