= Iceland in the Eurovision Song Contest 2016 =

- Eurovision Song Contest 2016
- Participating broadcaster: Ríkisútvarpið (RÚV)
- Country: Iceland
- Selection process: Söngvakeppnin 2016
- Selection date: 20 February 2016

Competing entry
- Song: "Hear Them Calling"
- Artist: Greta Salóme
- Songwriters: Greta Salóme Stefánsdóttir

Placement
- Semi-final result: Failed to qualify (14th)

Participation chronology

Iceland was represented at the Eurovision Song Contest 2016 with the song "Hear Them Calling" written and performed by Greta Salóme. Greta Salóme Stefánsdóttir previously represented Iceland in the Eurovision Song Contest 2012 in a duet with Jónsi, where they placed twentieth in the final of the competition with the song "Never Forget". The Icelandic entry for the 2016 contest in Stockholm, Sweden was selected through the national final Söngvakeppnin 2016, organised by the Icelandic broadcaster Ríkisútvarpið (RÚV). The selection consisted of two semi-finals and a final, held on 6, 13 and 20 February 2016, respectively. Six songs competed in each semi-final with the top three as selected by a public televote advancing to the final. In the final, the winner was selected over two rounds of voting: the first involved a 50/50 combination of regional jury voting and public televoting, which reduced the six competing entries to two superfinalists and the second round selected the winner exclusively through public televoting. "Hear Them Calling" performed by Greta Salóme emerged as the winner after gaining 61.32% of the public vote.

Iceland was drawn to compete in the first semi-final of the Eurovision Song Contest which took place on 10 May 2016. Performing during the show in position 16, "Hear Them Calling" was not announced among the top 10 entries of the first semi-final and therefore did not qualify to compete in the final. It was later revealed that Iceland placed fourteenth out of the 18 participating countries in the semi-final with 51 points.

== Background ==
Prior to the 2016 contest, Iceland had participated in the Eurovision Song Contest twenty-eight times since its first entry in 1986. Iceland's best placing in the contest to this point was second, which it achieved on two occasions: in 1999 with the song "All Out of Luck" performed by Selma and in 2009 with the song "Is It True?" performed by Yohanna. Since the introduction of a semi-final to the format of the Eurovision Song Contest in 2004, Iceland has, to this point, only failed to qualify to the final four times. In 2015, Iceland failed to qualify to the final with the song "Unbroken" performed by Maria Olafs.

The Icelandic national broadcaster, Ríkisútvarpið (RÚV), broadcasts the event within Iceland and organises the selection process for the nation's entry. RÚV confirmed their intentions to participate at the 2016 Eurovision Song Contest on 13 July 2015. Since 2006, Iceland has used a national final to select their entry for the Eurovision Song Contest, a method that continued for their 2016 participation.

== Before Eurovision ==
=== Söngvakeppnin 2016 ===
Söngvakeppnin 2016 was the national final format developed by RÚV in order to select Iceland's entry for the Eurovision Song Contest 2016. The competition simultaneously celebrated Iceland's 30th Anniversary since their first participation in the Eurovision Song Contest. The three shows in the competition were hosted by Ragnhildur Steinunn Jónsdóttir and Guðrún Dís Emilsdóttir and all took place in Reykjavík: the two semi-finals were held at the Háskólabíó venue and the final took place at the Laugardalshöll. The semi-finals and final were broadcast on RÚV and online at the broadcaster's official website ruv.is. The final was also broadcast via radio on Rás 2 and streamed online at the Eurovision Song Contest official website eurovision.tv.

==== Format ====
Twelve songs in total competed in Söngvakeppnin 2016 where the winner was determined after two semi-finals and a final. Six songs competed in each semi-final on 6 and 13 February 2016. The top three songs from each semi-final, as determined by public televoting qualified to the final which took place on 20 February 2016. The rules stated that a jury was going to select a wildcard act for the final out of the remaining non-qualifying acts from both semi-finals, however, it was later decided that a wildcard would be unnecessary. The winning entry in the final was determined over two rounds of voting: the first to select the top two via 50/50 public televoting and jury voting and the second to determine the winner with 100% televoting. All songs were required to be performed in Icelandic during the semi-final portion of the competition. In the final, the song was required to be performed in the language that the artist intended to perform in at the Eurovision Song Contest in Stockholm. In addition to selecting the Icelandic entry for Eurovision, a monetary prize of 1 million Icelandic króna was awarded to the songwriters responsible for the winning entry.

==== Competing entries ====
On 2 October 2015, RÚV opened the submission period for interested songwriters to submit their entries until the deadline on 2 November 2015, which was later extended by one week to 9 November 2015. Songwriters were required to be Icelandic, possess Icelandic citizenship or have permanent residency in Iceland between 1 September 2015 and 15 May 2016. However, exceptions would be made for minor collaborations with foreign songwriters as long as two-thirds of the composition and half of the lyrics are by Icelandic composers/lyricists. Composers had the right to submit up to two entries, while lyricists could contribute to an unlimited amount of entries. At the close of the submission deadline, 260 entries were received. A seven-member selection committee was formed under consultation with the Association of Composers (FTT) and the Icelandic Musicians' Union (FÍH) in order to select the top twelve entries. The twelve competing artists and songs were revealed by the broadcaster during the television programme Vikan með Gísla Marteini on 11 December 2015. Among the competing artists are previous Icelandic Eurovision entrants Pálmi Gunnarsson, who represented Iceland in 1986 as part of ICY, and Greta Salóme Stefánsdóttir, who represented Iceland in 2012 in a duet with Jónsi. RÚV presented the songs on 15 January 2016 during the Rás 2 radio programmes Virkir morgnar and Poppland. Five of the competing entries that later qualified to the final entered English versions of their songs for the competition.

| Artist | Song | | Songwriter(s) |
| Artist | Icelandic title | English title | Songwriter(s) |
|---|---|---|---|
| Alda Dís Arnardóttir | "Augnablik" | "Now" | Alma Guðmundsdóttir, James Wong, Alda Dís Arnardóttir |
| Elísabet Ormslev | "Á ný" | —N/a | Greta Salóme Stefánsdóttir |
| Erna Hrönn Ólafsdóttir and Hjörtur Traustason | "Hugur minn er" | "I Promised You Then" | Þórunn Erna Clausen |
| Erna Mist and Magnús Thorlacius | "Ótöluð orð" | "No Man's Land" | Erna Mist, Magnús Thorlacius |
| Eva | "Ég sé þig" | —N/a | Sigríður Eir Zophoniasardóttir, Jóhanna Vala Höskuldsdóttir |
| Greta Salóme Stefánsdóttir | "Raddirnar" | "Hear Them Calling" | Greta Salóme Stefánsdóttir |
| Helgi Valur Ásgeirsson | "Óvær" | —N/a | Karl Olgeirsson |
| Ingólfur Þórarinsson | "Fátækur námsmaður" | —N/a | Ingólfur Þórarinsson |
| Karlotta Sigurðardóttir | "Óstöðvandi" | "Eye of the Storm" | Kristinn Sigurpáll Sturluson, Karlotta Sigurðardóttir, Ylva Persson, Linda Persson |
| Pálmi Gunnarsson | "Ég leiði þig heim" | —N/a | Þórir Úlfarsson |
| Sigga Eyrún | "Kreisí" | —N/a | Karl Olgeirsson, Sigríður Eyrún Friðriksdóttir |
| Þórdís Birna Borgarsdóttir and Guðmundur Snorri Sigurðarson | "Spring yfir heiminn" | "Ready to Break Free" | Júlí Heiðar Halldórsson, Guðmundur Snorri Sigurðarson |

==== Shows ====
===== Semi-finals =====
Two semi-finals took place on 6 and 13 February 2016. In each semi-final six acts presented their entries, and the top three entries voted upon solely by public televoting proceeded to the final. The shows also featured guest performances by 101 Boys and 1997 Icelandic Eurovision entrant Páll Óskar in the first semi-final, and Högni Egilsson and 2014 Icelandic Eurovision entrants Pollapönk in the second semi-final. 101 Boys covered the debut 1986 Icelandic Eurovision entry "Gleðibankinn", while Óskar performed the song "Vinnum þetta fyrirfram", which was written specifically to celebrate Iceland's 30th anniversary competing in the Eurovision Song Contest.

Semi-final 1 – 6 February 2016
| R/O | Artist | Song | Televote | Place |
|---|---|---|---|---|
| 1 | Greta Salóme Stefánsdóttir | "Raddirnar" | 4,534 | 3 |
| 2 | Erna Hrönn Ólafsdóttir and Hjörtur Traustason | "Hugur minn er" | 4,536 | 2 |
| 3 | Ingólfur Þórarinsson | "Fátækur námsmaður" | 3,474 | 4 |
| 4 | Eva | "Ég sé þig" | 1,599 | 6 |
| 5 | Karlotta Sigurðardóttir | "Óstöðvandi" | 5,943 | 1 |
| 6 | Sigga Eyrún | "Kreisí" | 2,167 | 5 |

Semi-final 2 – 13 February 2016
| R/O | Artist | Song | Televote | Place |
|---|---|---|---|---|
| 1 | Þórdís Birna Borgarsdóttir and Guðmundur Snorri Sigurðarson | "Spring yfir heiminn" | 4,909 | 2 |
| 2 | Erna Mist and Magnús Thorlacius | "Ótöluð orð" | 2,847 | 4 |
| 3 | Helgi Valur Ásgeirsson | "Óvær" | 1,256 | 6 |
| 4 | Elísabet Ormslev | "Á ný" | 3,464 | 3 |
| 5 | Pálmi Gunnarsson | "Ég leiði þig heim" | 1,606 | 5 |
| 6 | Alda Dís Arnardóttir | "Augnablik" | 6,879 | 1 |

===== Final =====
The final took place on 20 February 2016 where the six entries that qualified from the preceding two semi-finals competed. In the semi-finals, all competing entries were required to be performed in Icelandic; however, entries competing in the final were required to be presented in the language they would compete with in the Eurovision Song Contest. Only one entry remained in Icelandic ("Á ný" performed by Elísabet Ormslev), while the other five entries competed in English. In the first round of voting, votes from six regional juries (50%) and public televoting (50%) determined the top two entries. The top two entries advanced to a second round of voting, the superfinal, where the winner, "Hear Them Calling" performed by Greta Salóme Stefánsdóttir, was determined solely by televoting. In addition to the performances of the competing artists, the show was opened by a medley featuring past Icelandic Eurovision entrants performing the Icelandic Eurovision songs, while the interval acts featured guest performances by Eurovision Song Contest 1986 winner Sandra Kim, who won for Belgium with the song "J'aime la vie", and Eurovision Song Contest 2012 winner Loreen, who won for Sweden with the song "Euphoria".

Final – 20 February 2016
| R/O | Artist | Song | Jury | Televote | Total | Place |
|---|---|---|---|---|---|---|
| 1 | Greta Salóme Stefánsdóttir | "Hear Them Calling" | 9,100 | 11,769 | 20,869 | 2 |
| 2 | Erna Hrönn Ólafsdóttir and Hjörtur Traustason | "I Promised You Then" | 8,255 | 8,218 | 16,473 | 4 |
| 3 | Karlotta Sigurðardóttir | "Eye of the Storm" | 8,710 | 10,820 | 19,530 | 3 |
| 4 | Þórdís Birna Borgarsdóttir and Guðmundur Snorri Sigurðarson | "Ready to Break Free" | 8,255 | 8,211 | 16,466 | 5 |
| 5 | Elísabet Ormslev | "Á ný" | 10,790 | 5,296 | 16,086 | 6 |
| 6 | Alda Dís Arnardóttir | "Now" | 11,050 | 11,847 | 22,897 | 1 |

Detailed Regional Jury Votes
| R/O | Song | Northwest | Northeast | South | Southwest | Reykjavík North | Reykjavík South | Total |
|---|---|---|---|---|---|---|---|---|
| 1 | "Hear Them Calling" | 1,820 | 1,170 | 1,365 | 1,560 | 1,495 | 1,690 | 9,100 |
| 2 | "I Promised You Then" | 1,625 | 1,430 | 1,235 | 1,235 | 1,625 | 1,105 | 8,255 |
| 3 | "Eye of the Storm" | 1,430 | 1,755 | 1,300 | 1,495 | 1,560 | 1,170 | 8,710 |
| 4 | "Ready to Break Free" | 1,105 | 1,495 | 2,210 | 1,170 | 975 | 1,300 | 8,255 |
| 5 | "Á ný" | 1,430 | 2,210 | 1,170 | 2,080 | 2,015 | 1,885 | 10,790 |
| 6 | "Now" | 1,950 | 1,300 | 2,080 | 1,820 | 1,690 | 2,210 | 11,050 |

Members of the Jury
| Jury | Members |
|---|---|
| Northwest | Samúel Einarsson – musician; Bjarney Ingibjörg Gunnlaugsdóttir – vocal teacher, choir leader; Valgerður Jónsdóttir – music teacher |
| Northeast | Baldvin Eyjólfsson – music teacher; Lára Sóley Jóhannsdóttir – violinist, singer; Þórunn Gréta Sigurðardóttir – composer, chairman of the Composers' Association of Iceland |
| South | Stefán Þorleifsson – musician; Jóhann Morávek – principal of the East County Music School; Sigrún Gróa Magnúsdóttir – piano teacher |
| Southwest | Ólafur Páll Gunnarsson – radio presenter; Erla Ragnarsdóttir – singer; Eiður Arnarsson – musician |
| Reykjavík North | Björn G. Björnsson – stage artist, musician; Margrét Eir Hönnudóttir – singer; Védís Hervör Árnadóttir – singer |
| Reykjavík South | Kamilla Ingibergsdóttir – Of Monsters and Men support member; Kristján Sturla Bjarnason – musician; Gissur Páll Gissurarson – singer |

Superfinal – 20 February 2016
| R/O | Artist | Song | Televote | Place |
|---|---|---|---|---|
| 1 | Greta Salóme Stefánsdóttir | "Hear Them Calling" | 39,807 | 1 |
| 2 | Alda Dís Arnardóttir | "Now" | 25,111 | 2 |

=== Promotion ===
Greta Salóme made several appearances across Europe to specifically promote "Hear Them Calling" as the Icelandic Eurovision entry. On 9 April, Greta Salóme performed during the Eurovision in Concert event which was held at the Melkweg venue in Amsterdam, Netherlands and hosted by Cornald Maas and Hera Björk. On 17 April, Greta Salóme performed during the London Eurovision Party, which was held at the Café de Paris venue in London, United Kingdom and hosted by Nicki French and Paddy O'Connell.

== At Eurovision ==
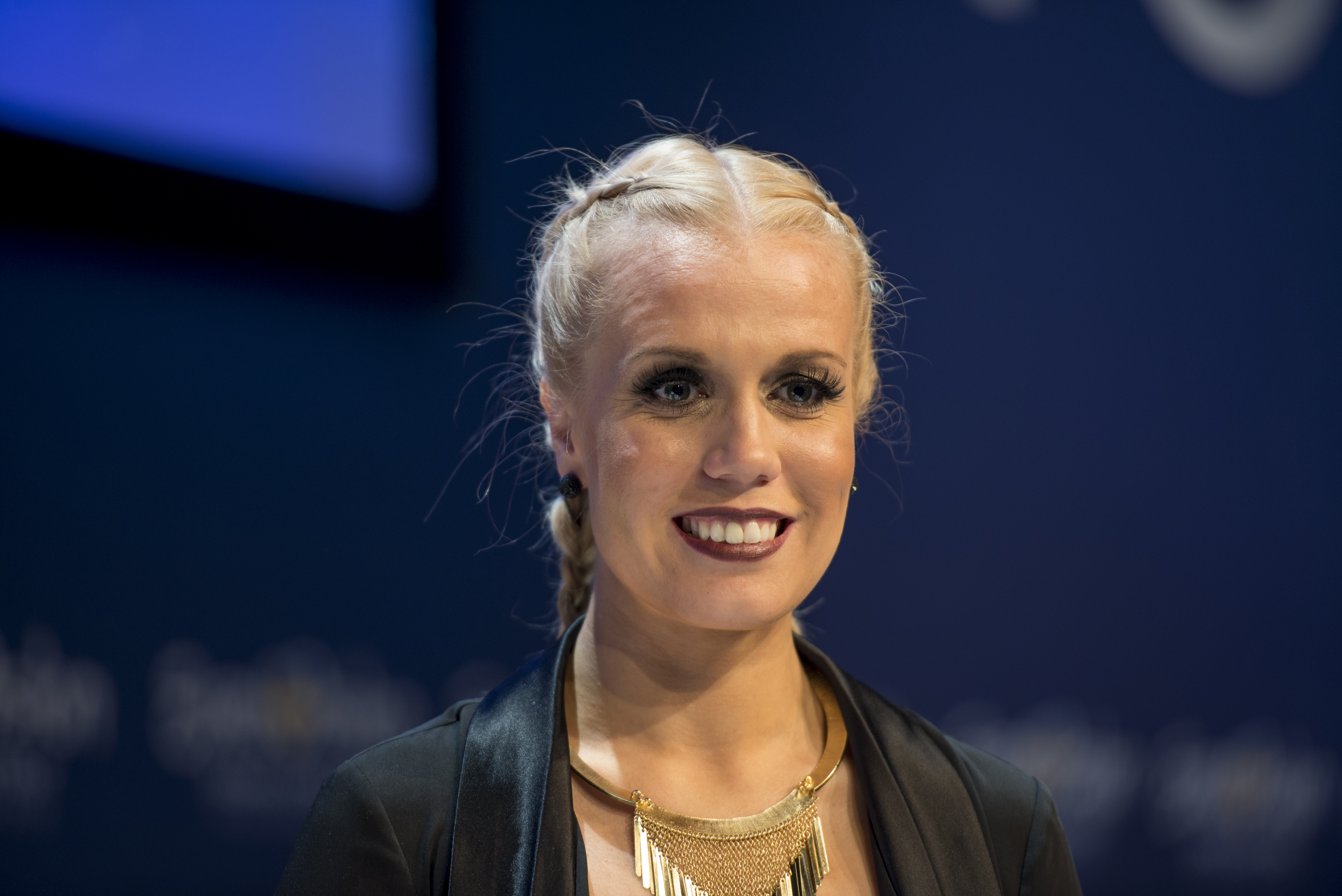
Greta Salóme during a press meet and greet

According to Eurovision rules, all nations with the exceptions of the host country and the "Big Five" (France, Germany, Italy, Spain and the United Kingdom) are required to qualify from one of two semi-finals in order to compete for the final; the top ten countries from each semi-final progress to the final. The European Broadcasting Union (EBU) split up the competing countries into six different pots based on voting patterns from previous contests, with countries with favourable voting histories put into the same pot. On 25 January 2016, a special allocation draw was held which placed each country into one of the two semi-finals, as well as which half of the show they would perform in. Iceland was placed into the first semi-final, to be held on 10 May 2016, and was scheduled to perform in the second half of the show.

Once all the competing songs for the 2016 contest had been released, the running order for the semi-finals was decided by the shows' producers rather than through another draw, so that similar songs were not placed next to each other. Iceland was set to perform in position 16, following the entry from Montenegro and before the entry from Bosnia and Herzegovina.

The two semi-finals and the final were broadcast in Iceland on RÚV and Rás 2 with commentary by Gísli Marteinn Baldursson. The Icelandic spokesperson, who announced the top 12-point score awarded by the Icelandic jury during the final, was Unnsteinn Manuel Stefánsson.

=== Semi-final ===
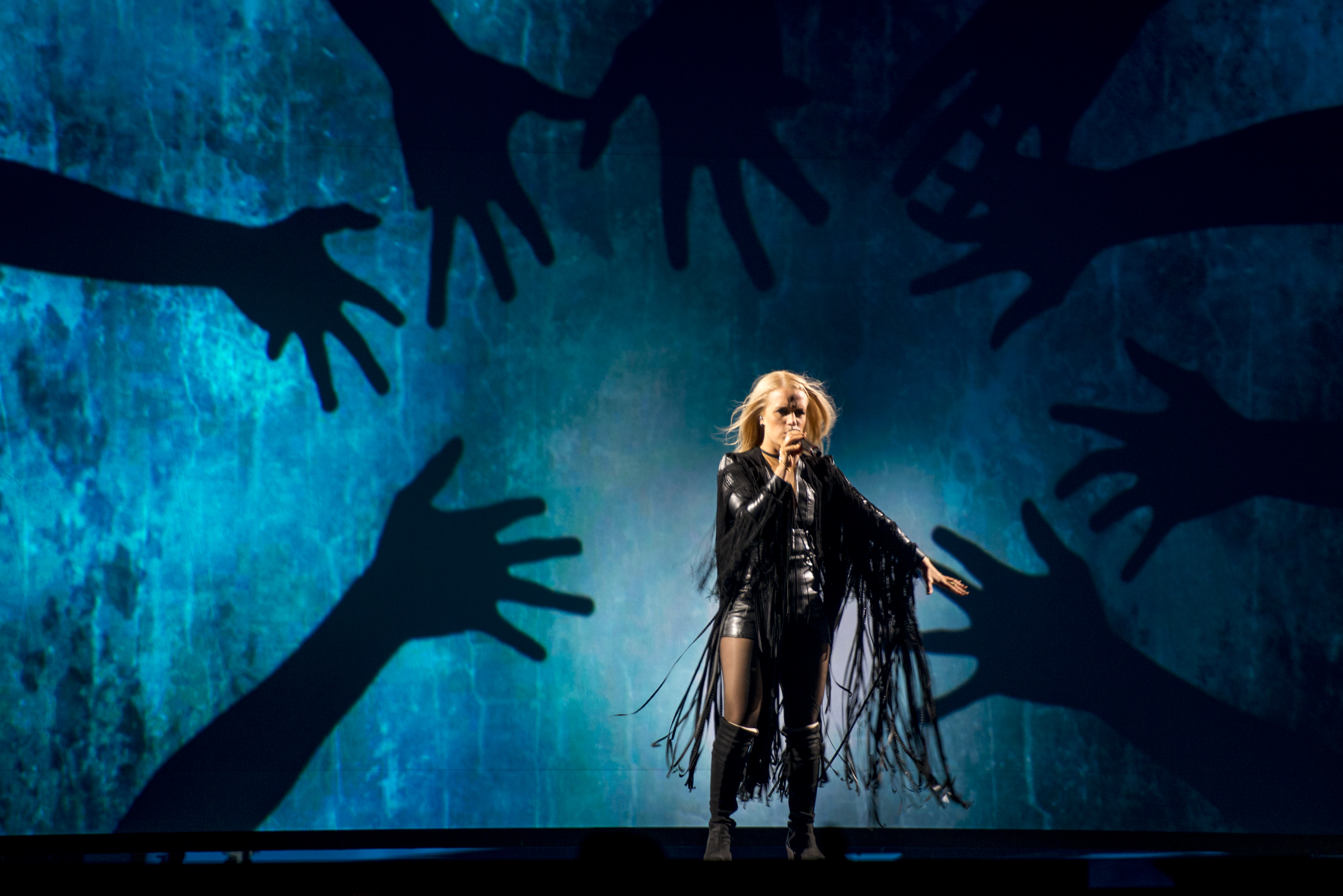
Greta Salóme during a rehearsal before the first semi-final

Greta Salóme took part in technical rehearsals on 3 and 6 May, followed by dress rehearsals on 9 and 10 May. This included the jury show on 9 May where the professional juries of each country watched and voted on the competing entries.

The Icelandic performance featured Greta Salóme dressed in a black leather outfit with long fringes and performing in front of and interacting with a projection screen, which featured shadow images of hands, birds, smoke and people. The creative director for the performance was Jonathan Duffy, who worked together with Ólöf Erla Einarsdóttir to create the graphics displayed on the projection screen. The choreography was completed by Ásgeir Helgi Magnússon. Greta Salóme was joined by five off-stage backing vocalists: Pétur Örn Guðmundsson, Gísli Magna, Hafsteinn Þórólfsson, Kristján Gíslason and Lilja Björk Runólfsdóttir. Kristján Gíslason previously represented Iceland in 2001 as part of Two Tricky.

At the end of the show, Iceland was not announced among the top 10 entries in the first semi-final and therefore failed to qualify to compete in the final. It was later revealed that Iceland placed fourteenth in the semi-final, receiving a total of 51 points: 24 points from the televoting and 27 points from the juries. This result was met by much media and public backlash as many were unhappy with the result.

=== Voting ===
Voting during the three shows was conducted under a new system that involved each country now awarding two sets of points from 1-8, 10 and 12: one from their professional jury and the other from televoting. Each nation's jury consisted of five music industry professionals who are citizens of the country they represent, with their names published before the contest to ensure transparency. This jury judged each entry based on: vocal capacity; the stage performance; the song's composition and originality; and the overall impression by the act. In addition, no member of a national jury was permitted to be related in any way to any of the competing acts in such a way that they cannot vote impartially and independently. The individual rankings of each jury member as well as the nation's televoting results were released shortly after the grand final.

Below is a breakdown of points awarded to Iceland and awarded by Iceland in the first semi-final and grand final of the contest, and the breakdown of the jury voting and televoting conducted during the two shows:

==== Points awarded to Iceland ====
Points awarded to Iceland (Semi-final 1)
| Score | Televote | Jury |
|---|---|---|
| 12 points | | |
| 10 points | | |
| 8 points | | |
| 7 points | | San Marino |
| 6 points | | |
| 5 points | Finland; Sweden | |
| 4 points | Spain | Czech Republic; Estonia; Finland |
| 3 points | Austria; Estonia; Malta | Austria |
| 2 points | | Spain |
| 1 point | San Marino | Croatia; Cyprus; Hungary |

==== Points awarded by Iceland ====
Points awarded by Iceland (Semi-final 1)
| Score | Televote | Jury |
|---|---|---|
| 12 points | Russia | Netherlands |
| 10 points | Netherlands | Russia |
| 8 points | Austria | Czech Republic |
| 7 points | Azerbaijan | Croatia |
| 6 points | Hungary | Malta |
| 5 points | Cyprus | Armenia |
| 4 points | Malta | Austria |
| 3 points | Armenia | Azerbaijan |
| 2 points | Finland | Hungary |
| 1 point | San Marino | Cyprus |

Points awarded by Iceland (Final)
| Score | Televote | Jury |
|---|---|---|
| 12 points | Sweden | Netherlands |
| 10 points | Poland | Australia |
| 8 points | Australia | Russia |
| 7 points | Russia | Croatia |
| 6 points | Netherlands | Sweden |
| 5 points | France | Czech Republic |
| 4 points | Lithuania | Malta |
| 3 points | Belgium | Belgium |
| 2 points | Austria | France |
| 1 point | Azerbaijan | Austria |

==== Detailed voting results ====
The following members comprised the Icelandic jury:

- Kristín Björg Þorsteinsdóttir (Kristín Björg; jury chairperson) – former TV producer
- Björgvin Ívar Baldursson (Björgvin Ívar) – music producer, engineer, musician
- Magnús Jón Kjartansson (Maggi Kjartans) – musician, composer
- Vera Hjördis Matsdóttir (Vera) – Music student
- Kristjana Stefánsdóttir (Kristjana Stefans) – singer, songwriter

Detailed voting results from Iceland (Semi-final 1)
| R/O | Country | Jury | | | | | | | Televote | |
| R/O | Country | K. Björg | B. Ívar | M. Kjartans | Vera | K. Stefans | Rank | Points | Rank | Points |
|---|---|---|---|---|---|---|---|---|---|---|
| 01 | Finland | 15 | 10 | 6 | 16 | 13 | 15 | | 9 | 2 |
| 02 | Greece | 16 | 12 | 7 | 8 | 16 | 14 | | 16 | |
| 03 | Moldova | 11 | 6 | 12 | 9 | 15 | 12 | | 11 | |
| 04 | Hungary | 12 | 16 | 3 | 11 | 7 | 9 | 2 | 5 | 6 |
| 05 | Croatia | 8 | 5 | 10 | 1 | 2 | 4 | 7 | 12 | |
| 06 | Netherlands | 2 | 1 | 2 | 3 | 1 | 1 | 12 | 2 | 10 |
| 07 | Armenia | 7 | 7 | 5 | 7 | 12 | 6 | 5 | 8 | 3 |
| 08 | San Marino | 6 | 3 | 15 | 14 | 14 | 11 | | 10 | 1 |
| 09 | Russia | 1 | 2 | 1 | 5 | 10 | 2 | 10 | 1 | 12 |
| 10 | Czech Republic | 3 | 4 | 4 | 4 | 9 | 3 | 8 | 13 | |
| 11 | Cyprus | 9 | 13 | 9 | 12 | 8 | 10 | 1 | 6 | 5 |
| 12 | Austria | 10 | 8 | 8 | 2 | 11 | 7 | 4 | 3 | 8 |
| 13 | Estonia | 13 | 17 | 11 | 13 | 4 | 13 | | 14 | |
| 14 | Azerbaijan | 5 | 11 | 14 | 10 | 6 | 8 | 3 | 4 | 7 |
| 15 | Montenegro | 14 | 14 | 16 | 17 | 3 | 16 | | 17 | |
| 16 | Iceland | | | | | | | | | |
| 17 | Bosnia and Herzegovina | 17 | 15 | 17 | 15 | 17 | 17 | | 15 | |
| 18 | Malta | 4 | 9 | 13 | 6 | 5 | 5 | 6 | 7 | 4 |

Detailed voting results from Iceland (Final)
| R/O | Country | Jury | | | | | | | Televote | |
| R/O | Country | K. Björg | B. Ívar | M. Kjartans | Vera | K. Stefans | Rank | Points | Rank | Points |
|---|---|---|---|---|---|---|---|---|---|---|
| 01 | Belgium | 12 | 11 | 4 | 12 | 12 | 8 | 3 | 8 | 3 |
| 02 | Czech Republic | 9 | 5 | 9 | 9 | 13 | 6 | 5 | 24 | |
| 03 | Netherlands | 3 | 2 | 2 | 3 | 1 | 1 | 12 | 5 | 6 |
| 04 | Azerbaijan | 16 | 12 | 17 | 11 | 16 | 13 | | 10 | 1 |
| 05 | Hungary | 18 | 26 | 10 | 23 | 8 | 18 | | 14 | |
| 06 | Italy | 25 | 10 | 18 | 25 | 7 | 19 | | 13 | |
| 07 | Israel | 15 | 24 | 6 | 24 | 11 | 16 | | 21 | |
| 08 | Bulgaria | 22 | 18 | 14 | 7 | 23 | 17 | | 12 | |
| 09 | Sweden | 1 | 4 | 19 | 4 | 17 | 5 | 6 | 1 | 12 |
| 10 | Germany | 24 | 6 | 21 | 19 | 18 | 22 | | 23 | |
| 11 | France | 7 | 14 | 22 | 6 | 5 | 9 | 2 | 6 | 5 |
| 12 | Poland | 4 | 23 | 20 | 16 | 6 | 12 | | 2 | 10 |
| 13 | Australia | 2 | 1 | 5 | 2 | 2 | 2 | 10 | 3 | 8 |
| 14 | Cyprus | 19 | 22 | 16 | 22 | 9 | 21 | | 16 | |
| 15 | Serbia | 23 | 17 | 23 | 10 | 26 | 25 | | 25 | |
| 16 | Lithuania | 10 | 16 | 15 | 21 | 15 | 14 | | 7 | 4 |
| 17 | Croatia | 6 | 8 | 24 | 1 | 4 | 4 | 7 | 26 | |
| 18 | Russia | 5 | 3 | 3 | 8 | 19 | 3 | 8 | 4 | 7 |
| 19 | Spain | 14 | 21 | 1 | 26 | 24 | 20 | | 15 | |
| 20 | Latvia | 20 | 25 | 26 | 18 | 20 | 26 | | 17 | |
| 21 | Ukraine | 11 | 20 | 7 | 20 | 21 | 15 | | 11 | |
| 22 | Malta | 8 | 7 | 12 | 15 | 3 | 7 | 4 | 19 | |
| 23 | Georgia | 26 | 19 | 25 | 13 | 10 | 24 | | 22 | |
| 24 | Austria | 17 | 9 | 8 | 5 | 22 | 10 | 1 | 9 | 2 |
| 25 | United Kingdom | 13 | 15 | 11 | 14 | 14 | 11 | | 20 | |
| 26 | Armenia | 21 | 13 | 13 | 17 | 25 | 23 | | 18 | |
