= Unbroken (María Ólafsdóttir song) =

2015 song by María Ólafsdóttir

Single by María Ólafsdóttir
- Released: 23 January 2015
- Recorded: 2014
- Genre: Pop; Pop rock
- Length: 3:04
- Label: Ice Cold Music Group
- Songwriters: Ásgeir Orri Ásgeirsson; Marcos Trujillo; Danyal Ahmed; Pálmi Ragnar Ásgeirsson; Sæþór Kristjánsson; María Ólafsdóttir
- Producers: Á. Ásgeirsson; P. Ásgeirsson; Kristjánsson

Eurovision Song Contest 2015 entry
- Country: Iceland
- Artist: María Ólafsdóttir
- Language: English
- Composers: Ásgeir Orri Ásgeirsson, Pálmi Ragnar Ásgeirsson, Sæþór Kristjánsson
- Lyricists: Ásgeir Orri Ásgeirsson, Pálmi Ragnar Ásgeirsson, Sæþór Kristjánsson, María Ólafsdóttir

Finals performance
- Semi-final result: Failed to qualify (15th)
- Semi-final points: 14

Entry chronology
- ◄ "No Prejudice" (2014)
- "Hear Them Calling" (2016) ►

"Unbroken" (also known as Icelandic: Lítil skref [ˈliːtɪl̥ ˈskrɛːf], transl. Little steps) is a song performed by Icelandic singer María Ólafsdóttir. The song represented Iceland in the Eurovision Song Contest 2015.

== Background ==
According to Maria, the song is about a breakup. In an interview with Eurovision fansite Wiwibloggs, she elaborated further, saying that "It's about getting stronger after [a] breakup".

== Release ==
The song was released on 23 January 2015, along with all other competing songs in Söngvakeppnin 2015 on Rás 1 radio programme Morgunútgafan.

== Eurovision Song Contest ==
=== Söngvakeppnin 2015 ===
Söngvakeppnin 2015 was the national final format developed by RÚV in order to select Iceland's entry for the Eurovision Song Contest 2015. The semi-finals and final were broadcast on RÚV and online at the broadcaster's official website ruv.is. The final was also broadcast via radio on Rás 2 and streamed online at the Eurovision Song Contest official website eurovision.tv.

Twelve songs in total competed in Söngvakeppnin 2015 where the winner was determined after two semi-finals and a final. Six songs competed in each semi-final on 31 January and 7 February 2015. The top three songs from each semi-final, as determined by public televoting qualified to the final which took place on 14 February 2015. A jury also selected a wildcard act for the final out of the remaining non-qualifying acts from both semi-finals. The winning entry in the final was determined over two rounds of voting: the first to select the top two via 50/50 public televoting and jury voting and the second to determine the winner with 100% televoting. All songs were required to be performed in Icelandic during the semi-final portion of the competition. In the final, the song was required to be performed in the language that the artist intended to perform in at the Eurovision Song Contest in Vienna.

"Lítil skref" competed in the second semi-final, qualifying with it being first in the semi-final.

The final took place on 14 February 2015 where the seven entries that qualified from the preceding two semi-finals competed. In the final, the song was changed to an English song title along with English lyrics. "Unbroken" would earn a second place in the final, gaining an berth to the superfinal also held on the same day. In the superfinal, "Unbroken" was able to run away with the victory, winning with 70,774 votes, just about 15,000 more than the second-place song. As a result, the song would go on to represent Iceland in the Eurovision Song Contest 2015.

=== At Eurovision ===
According to Eurovision rules, all nations with the exceptions of the host country and the "Big Five" (France, Germany, Italy, Spain and the United Kingdom) are required to qualify from one of two semi-finals in order to compete for the final; the top ten countries from each semi-final progress to the final. In the 2015 contest, Australia also competed directly in the final as an invited guest nation. The European Broadcasting Union (EBU) split up the competing countries into five different pots based on voting patterns from previous contests, with countries with favourable voting histories put into the same pot. On 26 January 2015, a special allocation draw was held which placed each country into one of the two semi-finals, as well as which half of the show they would perform in. Iceland was placed into the second semi-final, to be held on 21 May 2015, and was scheduled to perform in the second half of the show.

At the end of the show, Iceland was not announced among the top 10 entries in the second semi-final and therefore failed to qualify to compete in the final. It was later revealed that Iceland placed fifteenth in the semi-final, receiving a total of 14 points.

== Charts ==
Chart (2015)	Peak position
Iceland (RÚV)	1
