= Paper (Svala song) =

2017 single by Svala

Single by Svala
- Released: 20 March 2017
- Recorded: 2016
- Genre: Electropop
- Length: 3:00
- Label: Ríkisútvarpið
- Songwriter(s): Svala Björgvinsdóttir; Einar Egilsson; Lester Mendez; Lily Elise

Eurovision Song Contest 2017 entry
- Country: Iceland
- Artist(s): Svala
- Language: English
- Composer(s): Svala Björgvinsdóttir; Einar Egilsson; Lester Mendez; Lily Elise
- Lyricist(s): Svala Björgvinsdóttir; Einar Egilsson; Lester Mendez; Lily Elise

Finals performance
- Semi-final result: 15th
- Semi-final points: 60

Entry chronology
- ◄ "Hear Them Calling" (2016)
- "Our Choice" (2018) ►

"Paper" is a song performed by Icelandic singer Svala. The song was released as a digital download on 20 March 2017 through Ríkisútvarpið. It represented Iceland in the Eurovision Song Contest 2017, and was written by Svala Björgvinsdóttir, Einar Egilsson, Lester Mendez, and Lily Elise. The song was originally released in its Icelandic version, "Ég veit það".

== Eurovision Song Contest ==
On 20 January 2017, Svala was confirmed to be taking part in Söngvakeppnin 2017, Iceland's national final for the Eurovision Song Contest 2017. Both the English and Icelandic versions of the song were released on that day through the Icelandic broadcaster, Ríkisútvarpið (RÚV). Svala competed in the second semi-final on 4 March 2017, with the Icelandic version of the song. She gained the highest number of votes and advanced to the final, held on 11 March 2017. In the final, Svala performed the English version of the song. In the first round, she earned the highest number of public votes and votes from the jury, advancing to the superfinal along with Daði Freyr Pétursson. In the superfinal, she won over 62% of the vote, and was declared the winner, earning the right to represent Iceland in the Eurovision Song Contest 2017. Iceland competed in the second half of the first semi-final at the Eurovision Song Contest. The act did not qualify for the final, and was eliminated in semi-final 1.

== Track listing ==
Digital download
No.	Title	Length
1.	"Paper"	3:00
2.	"Ég veit það"	3:00
3.	"Paper" (Karaoke)	3:00
4.	"Ég veit það" (Karaoke)	3:00

Remixes - Single
No.	Title	Length
1.	"Paper" (Edvard Egilsson Remix)	5:10
2.	"Paper" (Daði Freyr Remix)	4:05

== Charts ==
Chart (2017)	Peak position
Iceland (RÚV)	1

== Release history ==
Region	Date	Format	Label
Worldwide	20 March 2017	Digital download	Ríkisútvarpið
