= Montenegro in the Eurovision Song Contest 2016 =

- Eurovision Song Contest 2016
- Participating broadcaster: Radio i Televizija Crne Gore (RTCG)
- Country: Montenegro
- Selection process: Internal selection
- Announcement date: Artist: 2 October 2015; Song: 4 March 2016

Competing entry
- Song: "The Real Thing"
- Artist: Highway
- Songwriters: Srđan Sekulović Skansi; Maro Market; Luka Vojvodić

Placement
- Semi-final result: Failed to qualify (13th)

Participation chronology

Montenegro was represented at the Eurovision Song Contest 2016 with the song "The Real Thing" written by Srđan Sekulović Skansi, Maro Market and Luka Vojvodić. The song was performed by the band Highway, which were internally selected by the Montenegrin broadcaster Radio i televizija Crne Gore (RTCG) to represent the nation at the 2016 contest in Stockholm, Sweden. Highway was announced as the Montenegrin representative on 2 October 2015, while their song, "The Real Thing", was presented to the public in a television special titled U susret Eurosongu on 4 March 2016.

Montenegro was drawn to compete in the first semi-final of the Eurovision Song Contest which took place on 10 May 2016. Performing during the show in position 15, "The Real Thing" was not announced among the top 10 entries of the first semi-final and therefore did not qualify to compete in the final. It was later revealed that Montenegro placed thirteenth out of the 18 participating countries in the semi-final with 60 points.

== Background ==
Prior to the 2016 contest, Montenegro had participated in the Eurovision Song Contest as an independent nation seven times since its first entry in its own right in 2007. The nation's best placing in the contest was thirteenth, which they achieved in 2015 with the song "Adio" performed by Knez. In 2014, Montenegro qualified to the final for the first time since they began participating and have since featured in the final of the Eurovision Song Contest two times up to this point. The nation briefly withdrew from the competition between 2010 and 2011 citing financial difficulties as the reason for their absence.

The Montenegrin national broadcaster, Radio i televizija Crne Gore (RTCG), broadcasts the event within Montenegro and organises the selection process for the nation's entry. Following the 2015 contest, the Montenegrin head of delegation for the Eurovision Song Contest, Sabrija Vulić, stated that a Montenegrin participation in 2016 was "questionable" due to the disqualification of the Montenegrin jury results by the European Broadcasting Union (EBU) during the contest's final. However, on 1 October 2015, RTCG confirmed that Montenegro would participate at the Eurovision Song Contest 2016. Montenegro has used various methods to select the Montenegrin entry in the past, such as internal selections and televised national finals to choose the performer, song or both to compete at Eurovision. Since 2009, the broadcaster has opted to internally select both the artist and song that would represent Montenegro, a procedure that continued for the selection of the 2016 entry.

== Before Eurovision ==
=== Internal selection ===
On 2 October 2015, RTCG announced that the band Highway would represent Montenegro in Stockholm. At the time of their selection, the band was a trio consisting of lead singer Petar Tošić and guitarists and backing vocalists Marko Pešić and Luka Vojvodić. Highway gained notability in Montenegro for their participation in the second season of the reality singing competition X Factor Adria, where they placed fourth. The selection of Highway as the Montenegrin representatives in the contest was decided by a selection jury that consisted of members of the RTCG Council: lyricist Dragan Tripković, Radio Montenegro music editor Nada Vučinić, TVCG music editor Slaven Knezović and jazz musician Milorad Šule Jovović. On 16 December 2015, the band announced that a fourth member had joined their group: keyboardist and vocalist Bojan Jovović. Jovović had previously represented Serbia and Montenegro at the Eurovision Song Contest in 2005 as part of the group No Name, which placed seventh at the contest with the song "Zauvijek moja".

The Montenegrin song, "The Real Thing", was presented during a television special titled U susret Eurosongu on 4 March 2016, which was held at the Hotel Splendid in Bečići and hosted by Tijana Mišković and Ivan Maksimović. The show was televised on TVCG 1 and TVCG SAT as well as broadcast online via the broadcaster's website rtcg.me and the official Eurovision Song Contest website eurovision.tv. In addition to the presentation of the song, the show featured guest performances by 2015 Montenegrin Eurovision entrant Knez and the 2016 Bosnian Eurovision entrants Dalal, Deen, Ana Rucner and Jala. "The Real Thing" was written by Srđan Sekulović Skansi, Maro Market and one of Highway's band members Luka Vojvodić, while production and mixing was carried out by Skansi and D'Knock. Earlier in late December 2015, Highway was interviewed on the RTV Atlas talk show programme Kod Mila hosted by Milo Radonjić, where the band confirmed that their Eurovision song would be performed in English and that they were working with Croatian producer Srđan Sekulović Skansi in order to prepare their entry. The band recorded the music video for the song in February 2016, which was filmed at the Studio Depo in Belgrade and directed by Julian Wood.

=== Promotion ===
Highway made several appearances across Europe to specifically promote "The Real Thing" as the Montenegrin Eurovision entry. On 9 April, Highway performed during the Eurovision in Concert event which was held at the Melkweg venue in Amsterdam, Netherlands and hosted by Cornald Maas and Hera Björk. On 17 April, Highway performed during the London Eurovision Party, which was held at the Café de Paris venue in London, United Kingdom and hosted by Nicki French and Paddy O'Connell. The band also completed promotional activities and made several appearances in television talk shows in Croatia, Bosnia and Herzegovina and Serbia. On 26 April, Highway appeared in and performed during a special Eurovision themed edition of the RTV Pink programme Ami G Show in Serbia.

== At Eurovision ==
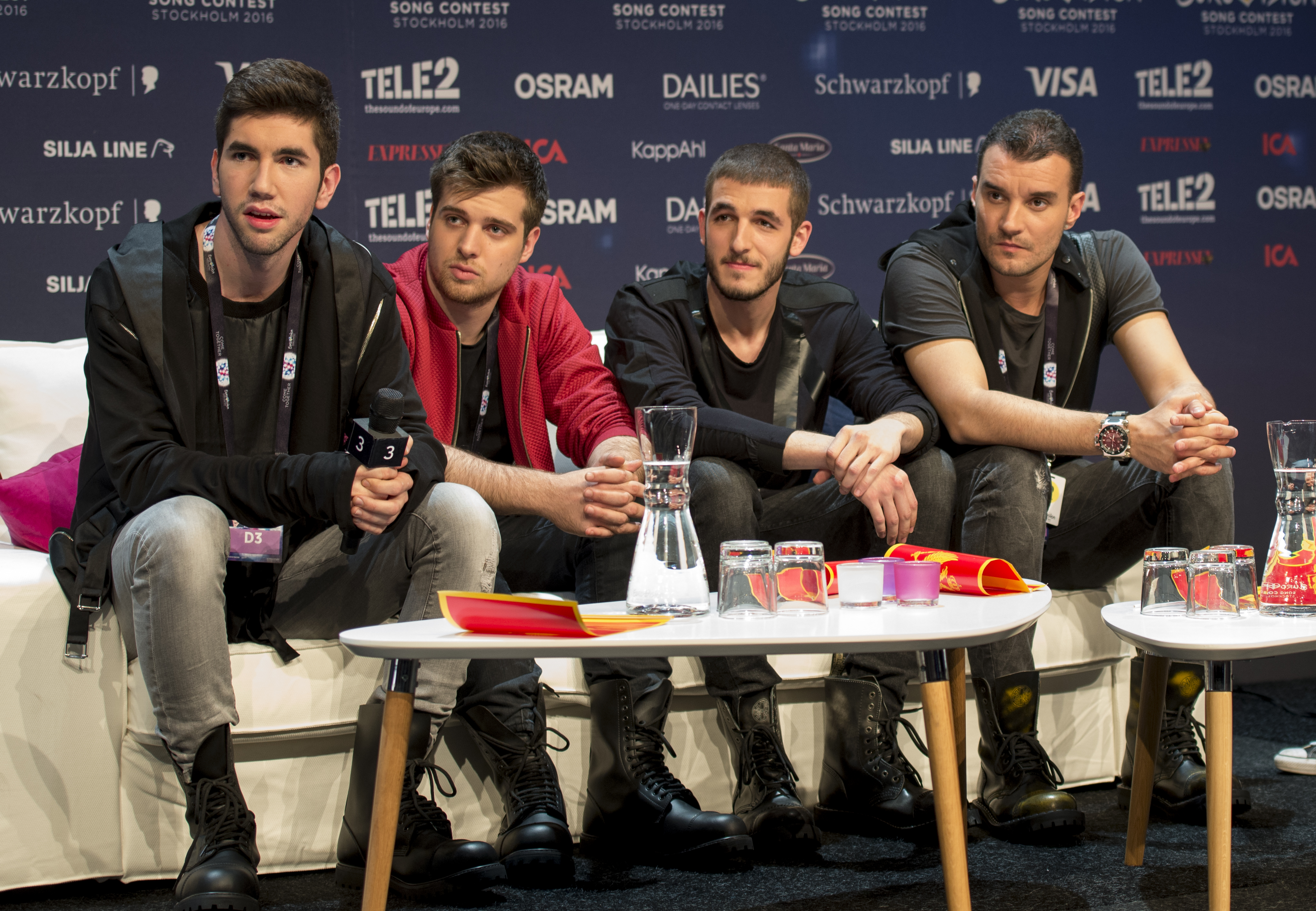
Highway during a press meet and greet

According to Eurovision rules, all nations with the exceptions of the host country and the "Big Five" (France, Germany, Italy, Spain and the United Kingdom) are required to qualify from one of two semi-finals in order to compete for the final; the top ten countries from each semi-final progress to the final. The European Broadcasting Union (EBU) split up the competing countries into six different pots based on voting patterns from previous contests, with countries with favourable voting histories put into the same pot. On 25 January 2016, a special allocation draw was held which placed each country into one of the two semi-finals, as well as which half of the show they would perform in. Montenegro was placed into the first semi-final, to be held on 10 May 2016, and was scheduled to perform in the second half of the show.

Once all the competing songs for the 2016 contest had been released, the running order for the semi-finals was decided by the shows' producers rather than through another draw, so that similar songs were not placed next to each other. Montenegro was set to perform in position 15, following the entry from Azerbaijan and before the entry from Iceland.

The two semi-finals and the final were broadcast in Montenegro on TVCG 1 and TVCG SAT with commentary by Dražen Bauković and Tijana Mišković. The Montenegrin spokesperson, who announced the top 12-point score awarded by the Montenegrin jury during the final, was Danijel Alibabić, who represented Serbia and Montenegro in the Eurovision Song Contest 2005 as part of the group No Name.

=== Semi-final ===
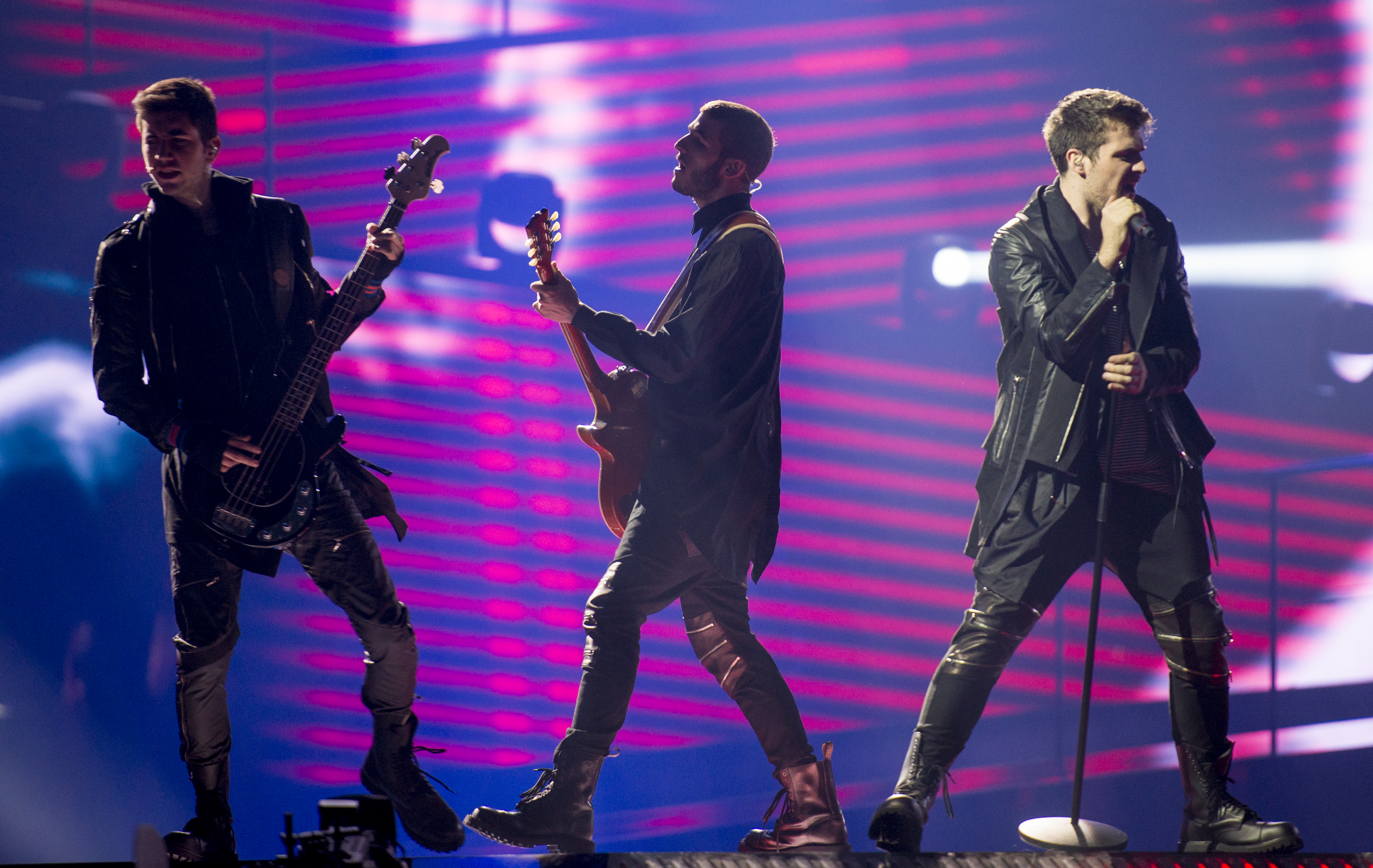
Highway during a rehearsal before the first semi-final

Highway took part in technical rehearsals on 3 and 6 May, followed by dress rehearsals on 9 and 10 May. This included the jury show on 9 May where the professional juries of each country watched and voted on the competing entries.

The Montenegrin performance featured the members of Highway on stage in a band set-up with a female backing vocalist/dancer performing a choreographed routine on the satellite stage. The performance began with focus on the backing vocalist/dancer followed by the camera zooming out to reveal the members of Highway on the main stage with the LED screens displaying blue and red colours. The stage director for the performance was Igor Basorović and the choreographer was Mirko Vukomanović. Highway's outfits were created by designer Vanja Pantin. The female backing vocalist/dancer performing with Highway was Marija Lazić and an additional male backing vocalist, Nikola Marjanović, was also part of the performance.

At the end of the show, Montenegro was not announced among the top 10 entries in the first semi-final and therefore failed to qualify to compete in the final. It was later revealed that Montenegro placed thirteenth in the semi-final, receiving a total of 60 points: 14 points from the televoting and 46 points from the juries.

=== Voting ===
Voting during the three shows was conducted under a new system that involved each country now awarding two sets of points from 1-8, 10 and 12: one from their professional jury and the other from televoting. Each nation's jury consisted of five music industry professionals who are citizens of the country they represent, with their names published before the contest to ensure transparency. This jury judged each entry based on: vocal capacity; the stage performance; the song's composition and originality; and the overall impression by the act. In addition, no member of a national jury was permitted to be related in any way to any of the competing acts in such a way that they cannot vote impartially and independently. The individual rankings of each jury member as well as the nation's televoting results were released shortly after the grand final.

Below is a breakdown of points awarded to Montenegro and awarded by Montenegro in the first semi-final and grand final of the contest, and the breakdown of the jury voting and televoting conducted during the two shows:

==== Points awarded to Montenegro ====
Points awarded to Montenegro (Semi-final 1)
Score	Televote	Jury
12 points		
10 points		Armenia; San Marino
8 points	Bosnia and Herzegovina	
7 points		Azerbaijan; Malta
6 points	Croatia	Greece
5 points		
4 points		
3 points		Bosnia and Herzegovina; Russia
2 points		
1 point		

==== Points awarded by Montenegro ====
Points awarded by Montenegro (Semi-final 1)
Score	Televote	Jury
12 points	Bosnia and Herzegovina	Armenia
10 points	Russia	Malta
8 points	Croatia	Russia
7 points	Azerbaijan	Croatia
6 points	Hungary	Bosnia and Herzegovina
5 points	Cyprus	Azerbaijan
4 points	Malta	Czech Republic
3 points	Armenia	Greece
2 points	San Marino	Netherlands
1 point	Czech Republic	Hungary

Points awarded by Montenegro (Final)
Score	Televote	Jury
12 points	Serbia	Malta
10 points	Russia	Armenia
8 points	Ukraine	Russia
7 points	Azerbaijan	Hungary
6 points	Croatia	Serbia
5 points	Bulgaria	France
4 points	Italy	Australia
3 points	Hungary	Belgium
2 points	Lithuania	Bulgaria
1 point	France	Poland

==== Detailed voting results ====
The following members will comprise the Montenegrin jury:

- Srđan Bulatović (jury chairperson) – classical music doctor, classical guitar player
- Dejan Božović – composer, guitar player
- Ivana Čanović – opera singer
- Andrea Demirović – singer, music professor, represented Montenegro in the 2009 contest
- Momčilo Zeković (Zeko) – composer, songwriter, bass guitar player

Detailed voting results from Montenegro (Semi-final 1)
R/O	Country	Jury							Televote	
R/O	Country	S. Bulatović	D. Božović	I. Čanović	A. Demirović	Zeko	Rank	Points	Rank	Points
01	Finland	12	16	14	15	17	16		12	
02	Greece	9	7	6	9	7	8	3	14	
03	Moldova	16	13	17	12	14	15		17	
04	Hungary	11	11	10	6	13	10	1	5	6
05	Croatia	3	4	8	2	6	4	7	3	8
06	Netherlands	6	8	7	14	10	9	2	13	
07	Armenia	1	2	3	1	2	1	12	8	3
08	San Marino	15	15	15	17	16	17		9	2
09	Russia	2	6	1	5	3	3	8	2	10
10	Czech Republic	10	5	5	7	8	7	4	10	1
11	Cyprus	8	10	12	11	15	11		6	5
12	Austria	17	17	13	13	11	14		11	
13	Estonia	13	14	16	10	12	13		16	
14	Azerbaijan	5	9	4	8	5	6	5	4	7
15	Montenegro									
16	Iceland	14	12	11	16	9	12		15	
17	Bosnia and Herzegovina	7	3	9	4	4	5	6	1	12
18	Malta	4	1	2	3	1	2	10	7	4

Detailed voting results from Montenegro (Final)
R/O	Country	Jury							Televote	
R/O	Country	S. Bulatović	D. Božović	I. Čanović	A. Demirović	Zeko	Rank	Points	Rank	Points
01	Belgium	22	5	11	11	5	8	3	16	
02	Czech Republic	16	19	14	14	18	16		26	
03	Netherlands	18	8	26	21	20	22		23	
04	Azerbaijan	6	22	13	15	24	15		4	7
05	Hungary	4	7	3	3	14	4	7	8	3
06	Italy	12	18	25	20	15	20		7	4
07	Israel	11	9	24	18	9	12		20	
08	Bulgaria	5	11	12	19	11	9	2	6	5
09	Sweden	26	21	23	26	17	25		15	
10	Germany	25	25	22	25	25	26		24	
11	France	15	4	7	8	6	6	5	10	1
12	Poland	9	20	8	10	12	10	1	21	
13	Australia	10	10	6	9	7	7	4	13	
14	Cyprus	19	6	21	24	4	13		12	
15	Serbia	7	12	5	5	8	5	6	1	12
16	Lithuania	21	17	20	12	16	18		9	2
17	Croatia	13	23	10	6	22	14		5	6
18	Russia	3	3	1	4	2	3	8	2	10
19	Spain	24	16	19	17	10	19		19	
20	Latvia	17	24	18	13	23	23		14	
21	Ukraine	8	15	17	7	19	11		3	8
22	Malta	2	2	2	2	1	1	12	18	
23	Georgia	20	13	16	23	21	21		22	
24	Austria	14	26	9	22	26	24		17	
25	United Kingdom	23	14	15	16	13	17		25	
26	Armenia	1	1	4	1	3	2	10	11	
