= Hear Them Calling =

2016 song by Greta Salóme Stefánsdóttir

Single by Greta Salóme Stefánsdóttir
- Language: English
- Genre: Folk pop
- Length: 2:59
- Label: RÚV
- Songwriter(s): Greta Salóme Stefánsdóttir
- Producer(s): Greta Salóme Stefánsdóttir

Greta Salóme singles chronology
"Fleyið" (2015)	"Hear Them Calling" (2016)	"Row" (2016)

Music video
- "Hear Them Calling" on YouTube

Eurovision Song Contest 2016 entry
- Country: Iceland

Finals performance
- Semi-final result: 14th
- Semi-final points: 51

Entry chronology
- ◄ "Unbroken" (2015)
- "Paper" (2017) ►

Official performance video
- "Hear Them Calling (First Semi-Final) on YouTube

"Hear Them Calling" (originally released as "Raddirnar" (Icelandic pronunciation: [ˈratːɪrtnar]; transl. "The Voices") is a song performed by Icelandic singer Greta Salóme. The song represented Iceland in the Eurovision Song Contest 2016 held in Stockholm, Sweden after winning Söngvakeppnin 2016, Iceland's national final for the Eurovision Song Contest 2016. The song did not qualify for that year's Grand Final, only earning 51 points, managing a 14th place finish in the first semi-final.

== Composition ==
Greta described the song as a "mixture of indie/contemporary folk pop, mixed with symphonic elements and then a dance beat, which makes it into an exciting fusion."

== Release ==
The original song was released as "Raddirnar" (Icelandic pronunciation: [ˈratːɪrtnar]) on 11 December 2015, along with the release of all other songs competing in Söngvakeppnin 2016. An English version of the song was eventually released on 19 February 2016.

The Eurovision version of "Hear Them Calling" was released on 18 March 2016, with the music made to feel more dramatic, according to Greta. Violins were also added to the traditional Icelandic folk instruments. Greta would report that the version was recorded with The North Iceland Symphony, with improvised violin parts.

== Eurovision Song Contest ==
=== Söngvakeppnin 2016 ===
Söngvakeppnin 2016 was the national final format developed by RÚV in order to select Iceland's entry for the Eurovision Song Contest 2016. Twelve songs in total competed in Söngvakeppnin 2016 where the winner was determined after two semi-finals and a final. Six songs competed in each semi-final on 6 and 13 February 2016. The top three songs from each semi-final, as determined by public televoting qualified to the final which took place on 20 February 2016. The winning entry in the final was determined over two rounds of voting: the first to select the top two via 50/50 public televoting and jury voting and the second to determine the winner with 100% televoting. All songs were required to be performed in Icelandic during the semi-final portion of the competition. In the final, the song was required to be performed in the language that the artist intended to perform in at the Eurovision Song Contest in Stockholm.

=== At Eurovision ===
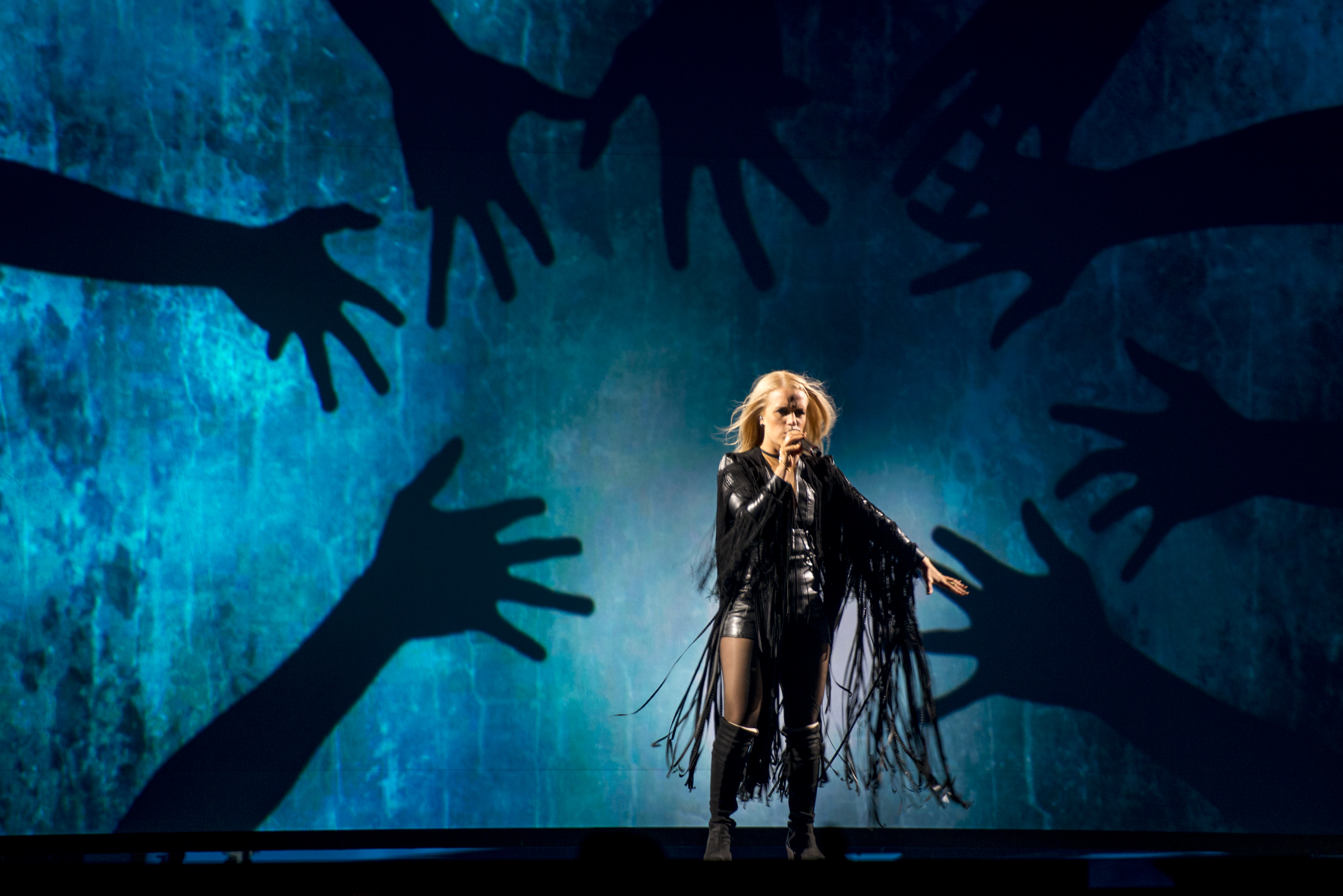
Greta Salóme during a rehearsal before the first semi-final

According to Eurovision rules, all nations with the exceptions of the host country and the "Big Five" (France, Germany, Italy, Spain and the United Kingdom) are required to qualify from one of two semi-finals in order to compete for the final; the top ten countries from each semi-final progress to the final. The European Broadcasting Union (EBU) split up the competing countries into six different pots based on voting patterns from previous contests, with countries with favourable voting histories put into the same pot. On 25 January 2016, a special allocation draw was held which placed each country into one of the two semi-finals, as well as which half of the show they would perform in. Iceland was placed into the first semi-final, to be held on 10 May 2016, and was scheduled to perform in the second half of the show. Once all the competing songs for the 2016 contest had been released, the running order for the semi-finals was decided by the shows' producers rather than through another draw, so that similar songs were not placed next to each other. Iceland was set to perform in position 16, following the entry from Montenegro and before the entry from Bosnia and Herzegovina.

The performance featured Greta in a long, black leather suit interacting with an LED screen behind her, with her controlling images of hands, birds, and people. Greta, in an interview with Wiwibloggs correspondent William Lee Adams, said that the outfit was to represent being strong and powerful, saying that "It's a statement piece, and for me, being a powerful woman, someone who can stand their ground. I want to be a role model, especially for woman who want to write their own music. I think it's an important thing." She also reported that the uniform was made to look like a bird.

At the end of the show, Iceland was not announced among the top 10 entries in the first semi-final and therefore failed to qualify to compete in the final. It was later revealed that Iceland placed fourteenth in the semi-final, receiving a total of 51 points: 24 points from the televoting and 27 points from the juries.

== Eurovision Again ==
In December 2020 the EurovisionAgain online series, endorsed by the EBU, held a contest for the best song eliminated in the semi-finals, and "Hear Them calling" won the vote.

== Charts ==
Chart (2016)	Peak position
Iceland (RÚV)	17
