= Croatia in the Eurovision Song Contest 2016 =

- Eurovision Song Contest 2016
- Country: Croatia
- Selection process: Internal selection
- Announcement date: Artist: 24 February 2016; Song: 9 March 2016

Competing entry
- Song: "Lighthouse"
- Artist: Nina Kraljić
- Songwriters: Andreas Grass; Nikola Paryla

Placement
- Semi-final result: Qualified (10th, 133 points)
- Final result: 23rd, 73 points

Participation chronology

Croatia was represented at the Eurovision Song Contest 2016 with the song "Lighthouse" written by Andreas Grass and Nikola Paryla. The song was performed by Nina Kraljić. Croatia returned to the Eurovision Song Contest after a two-year absence following their withdrawal in 2014 due to financial limitations and poor results at the contest. Nina Kraljić was selected internally by the Croatian broadcaster Croatian Radiotelevision (HRT) on 24 February 2016 to represent Croatia at the 2016 contest in Stockholm, Sweden. Her song "Lighthouse" was presented to the public on 9 March 2016 during a special radio programme broadcast on the HR 2 station.

Croatia was drawn to compete in the first semi-final of the Eurovision Song Contest which took place on 10 May 2016. Performing during the show in position 5, "Lighthouse" was announced among the top 10 entries of the first semi-final and therefore qualified to compete in the final on 14 May. This was Croatia's first qualification to the final in seven years; their last appearance in the final was in 2009. It was later revealed that Croatia placed tenth out of the 18 participating countries in the semi-final with 133 points. In the final, Croatia performed in position 17 and placed twenty-third out of the 26 participating countries, scoring 73 points.

== Background ==
Prior to the 2016 contest, Croatia had participated in the Eurovision Song Contest twenty-one times since its first entry in 1993. The nation's best result in the contest was fourth, which it achieved on two occasions: in 1996 with the song "Sveta ljubav" performed by Maja Blagdan and in 1999 with the song "Marija Magdalena" performed by Doris Dragović. Following the introduction of semi-finals for the 2004, Croatia had thus far featured in five finals. Between 2010 and 2013, the Croatian entries failed to qualify from the semi-finals; the last time Croatia competed in the final was in 2009 with the song "Lijepa Tena" performed by Igor Cukrov featuring Andrea. In 2013, Croatia failed to qualify to the final with Klapa s Mora and the song "Mižerja".

The Croatian national broadcaster, Croatian Radiotelevision (HRT), broadcasts the event within Croatia and organises the selection process for the nation's entry. Between 1993 and 2011, HRT organised the national final Dora in order to select the Croatian entry for the Eurovision Song Contest. In 2012 and 2013, the broadcaster opted to internally select the entry. After consistently being present for every contest since their debut in 1993, the Croatian broadcaster announced in September 2013 that the country would not participate in the 2014 citing the European financial crisis and a string of poor results at the contest as reasons for their decision. The broadcaster extended their absence from the contest, missing the 2015 as well. Following their two-year absence, HRT confirmed Croatia's participation in the 2016 Eurovision Song Contest on 26 November 2015 and continued the internal selection procedure.

== Before Eurovision ==
=== Internal selection ===
On 24 February 2016, the Croatian national broadcaster HRT announced that it had internally selected Nina Kraljić to represent Croatia at the Eurovision Song Contest 2016. Previously, Croatian media reported between May and June 2015 that if Croatia returned to the contest, HRT would likely select the winner of the reality singing competition The Voice – Najljepši glas Hrvatske, Nina Kraljić, to represent the nation.

The song that Kraljić performed at the Eurovision Song Contest, "Lighthouse", was presented on 9 March 2016 during a special radio programme broadcast on HR 2 and hosted by Zlatko Turkalj Turki. Nina Kraljić, the Croatian Eurovision Song Contest Head of Delegation Željko Mesar and Universal Music Croatia marketing manager Nina Meden were guests during the presentation show. The song was written by the Austrian songwriting team Popmaché, consisting of Andreas Grass and Nikola Paryla, and produced by Thorsten Brötzmann in Germany. Grass and Paryla were also the co-writers of "Shine", the Austrian Eurovision Song Contest entry in 2013. In regards to her song, Kraljić stated: "It has been an exceptional honour for me to work with such a talented and experienced team. The song has a brilliant message of hope, which, without looking at all the mischiefs in life, is always present and shining".

=== Preparation ===
On 21 March, the preview video submitted for the Eurovision Song Contest by HRT for "Lighthouse" premiered, which featured a compilation of video segments from the short film Hvar Into the Storm, filmed by Mario Romulić and Dražen Stojčić. In late March and early April, Kraljić filmed the music video for "Lighthouse", which was directed by Filip Filković Philatz and the company Antitalent Production. The music video was released to the public on 7 April.

=== Promotion ===
Nina Kraljić made several appearances across Europe to specifically promote "Lighthouse" as the Croatian Eurovision entry. At the end of March 2016, Nina Kraljić completed a 48-hour tour of Serbia where she gave several interviews about her Eurovision participation to media outlets from Radio Television of Serbia (RTS), RTV Pink, N1 Studios and MTV Adria; Kraljić also performed "Lighthouse" live for the first time during the RTS morning programme. On 9 April, Kraljić performed during the Eurovision in Concert event which was held at the Melkweg venue in Amsterdam, Netherlands and hosted by Cornald Maas and Hera Björk. On 17 April, Kraljić performed during the London Eurovision Party, which was held at the Café de Paris venue in London, United Kingdom and hosted by Nicki French and Paddy O'Connell.

In addition to her international appearances, Nina Kraljić performed "Lighthouse" as a musical guest during the 2016 Miss Universe Croatia pageant in Zagreb on 15 April and she also performed the song as a guest during the HRT 1 programme The Voice – Najljepši glas Hrvatske on 16 April. On 27 April, Kraljić held a concert together with Jacques Houdek at the Vatroslav Lisinski Concert Hall in Zagreb.

== At Eurovision ==
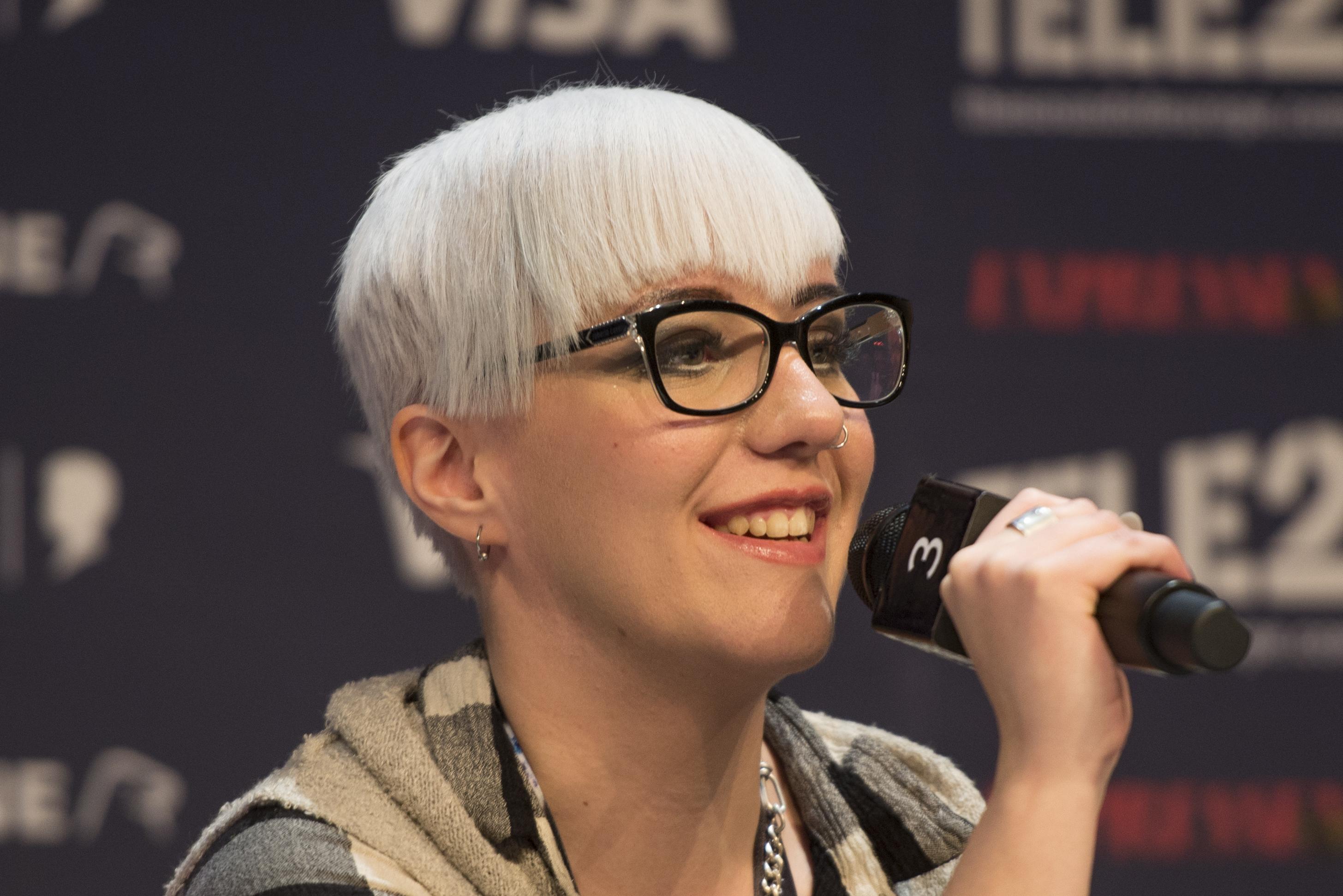
Nina Kraljić during a press meet and greet

According to Eurovision rules, all nations with the exceptions of the host country and the "Big Five" (France, Germany, Italy, Spain and the United Kingdom) are required to qualify from one of two semi-finals in order to compete for the final; the top ten countries from each semi-final progress to the final. The European Broadcasting Union (EBU) split up the competing countries into six different pots based on voting patterns from previous contests, with countries with favourable voting histories put into the same pot. On 25 January 2016, a special allocation draw was held which placed each country into one of the two semi-finals, as well as which half of the show they would perform in. Croatia was placed into the first semi-final, to be held on 10 May 2016, and was scheduled to perform in the first half of the show.

Once all the competing songs for the 2016 contest had been released, the running order for the semi-finals was decided by the shows' producers rather than through another draw, so that similar songs were not placed next to each other. Croatia was set to perform in position 5, following the entry from Hungary and before the entry from the Netherlands.

The two semi-finals and the final were broadcast in Croatia on HRT 1 with commentary by Duško Ćurlić. The three shows were also broadcast via radio on HR 2 with commentary by Zlatko Turkalj Turki. The Croatian spokesperson, who announced the top 12-point score awarded by the Croatian jury during the final, was Nevena Rendeli.

=== Semi-final ===
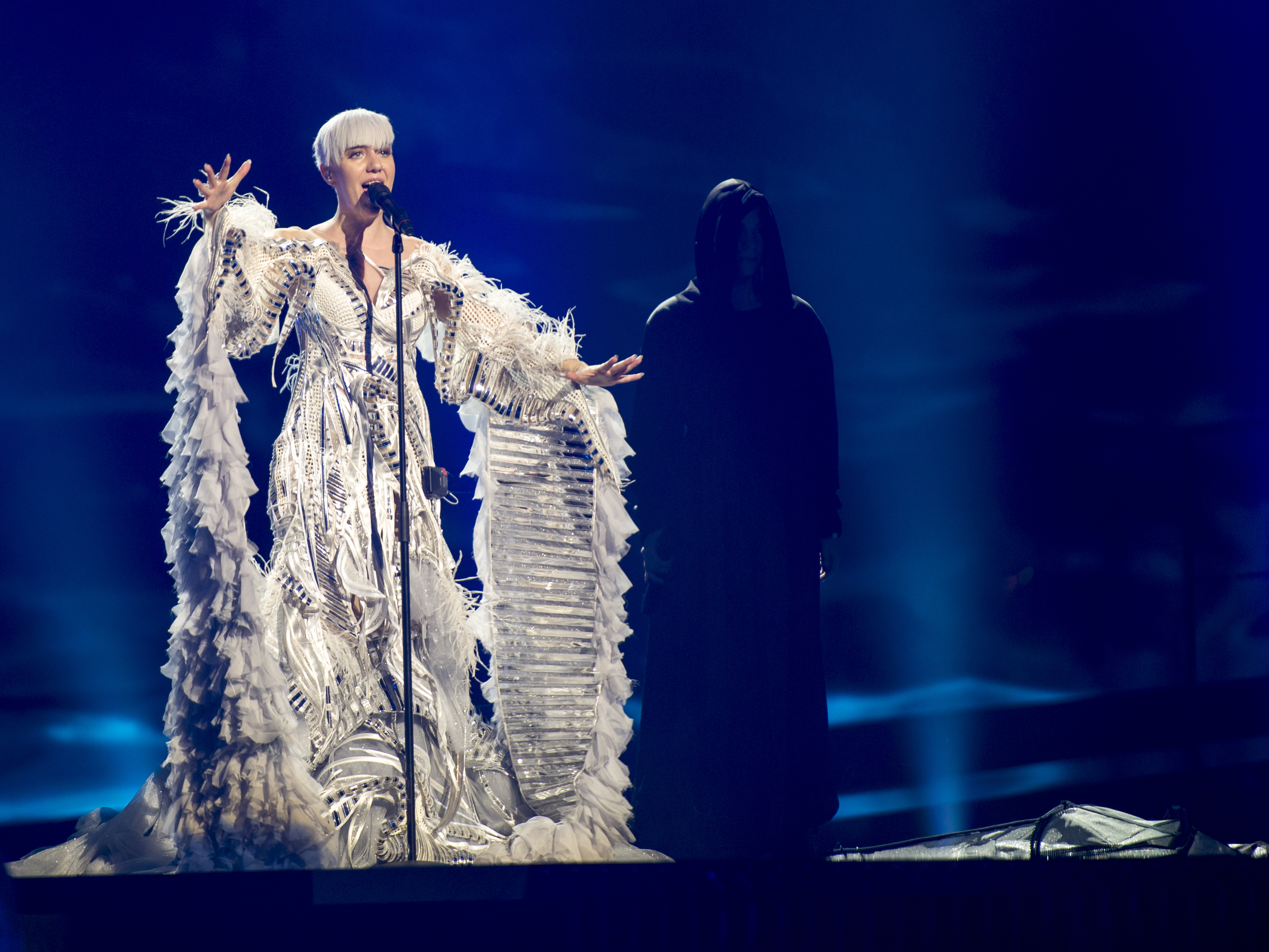
Nina Kraljić during a rehearsal before the first semi-final

Nina Kraljić took part in technical rehearsals on 2 and 6 May, followed by dress rehearsals on 9 and 10 May. This included the jury show on 9 May where the professional juries of each country watched and voted on the competing entries.

The Croatian performance featured Nina Kraljić dressed in a large black-patterned grey coat, which was removed to reveal a white dress with blue and metallic elements. Kraljić's outfit was designed by Juraj Zigman with shoes designed by Ivan Ledenko. The stage lighting transitioned from blue to red as the performance progressed with the LED screens projecting sea waves and starry skies. Kraljić was joined on stage by four backing vocalists dressed in black coats: Andrej Babić, Martina Majerle, Danijela Večerinović and Lino Lacmanović Ćućić. Majerle previously represented Slovenia in the Eurovision Song Contest 2009 together with the group Quartissimo where they failed to qualify to the grand final of the contest with the song "Love Symphony".

At the end of the show, Croatia was announced as having finished in the top 10 and subsequently qualifying for the grand final. This was Croatia's first qualification to the final in seven years; their last appearance in the final was in 2009. It was later revealed that Croatia placed tenth in the semi-final, receiving a total of 133 points: 53 points from the televoting and 80 points from the juries.

=== Final ===
Shortly after the first semi-final, a winners' press conference was held for the ten qualifying countries. As part of this press conference, the qualifying artists took part in a draw to determine which half of the grand final they would subsequently participate in. This draw was done in the order the countries appeared in the semi-final running order. Croatia was drawn to compete in the second half. Following this draw, the shows' producers decided upon the running order of the final, as they had done for the semi-finals. Croatia was subsequently placed to perform in position 17, following the entry from Lithuania and before the entry from Russia.

Nina Kraljić once again took part in dress rehearsals on 13 and 14 May before the final, including the jury final where the professional juries cast their final votes before the live show. Nina Kraljić performed a repeat of her semi-final performance during the final on 14 May. Croatia placed twenty-third in the final, scoring 73 points: 33 points from the televoting and 40 points from the juries.

=== Voting ===
Voting during the three shows was conducted under a new system that involved each country now awarding two sets of points from 1-8, 10 and 12: one from their professional jury and the other from televoting. Each nation's jury consisted of five music industry professionals who are citizens of the country they represent, with their names published before the contest to ensure transparency. This jury judged each entry based on: vocal capacity; the stage performance; the song's composition and originality; and the overall impression by the act. In addition, no member of a national jury was permitted to be related in any way to any of the competing acts in such a way that they cannot vote impartially and independently. The individual rankings of each jury member as well as the nation's televoting results were released shortly after the grand final.

Below is a breakdown of points awarded to Croatia and awarded by Croatia in the first semi-final and grand final of the contest, and the breakdown of the jury voting and televoting conducted during the two shows:

==== Points awarded to Croatia ====
Points awarded to Croatia (Semi-final 1)
Score	Televote	Jury
12 points	Bosnia and Herzegovina	Netherlands
10 points		
8 points	Montenegro	
7 points		Austria; Cyprus; Iceland; Montenegro
6 points	Austria	Czech Republic; France
5 points	Netherlands	Bosnia and Herzegovina; Finland; Moldova
4 points	Greece; Russia	
3 points	Armenia	Estonia; Hungary; Sweden
2 points	Czech Republic; Finland; Moldova; Spain	Armenia
1 point	Cyprus; France; Sweden	Russia; San Marino

Points awarded to Croatia (Final)
Score	Televote	Jury
12 points		
10 points	Bosnia and Herzegovina	
8 points	Slovenia	Czech Republic
7 points		Iceland
6 points	Montenegro	Austria; Macedonia
5 points	Macedonia	
4 points	Serbia	Bosnia and Herzegovina
3 points		Israel
2 points		Georgia
1 point		Australia; Cyprus; Moldova; United Kingdom

==== Points awarded by Croatia ====
Points awarded by Croatia (Semi-final 1)
Score	Televote	Jury
12 points	Bosnia and Herzegovina	Czech Republic
10 points	Russia	Cyprus
8 points	Hungary	Hungary
7 points	Austria	Malta
6 points	Montenegro	Russia
5 points	Netherlands	Armenia
4 points	Czech Republic	Bosnia and Herzegovina
3 points	Armenia	Azerbaijan
2 points	Cyprus	Netherlands
1 point	Malta	Iceland

Points awarded by Croatia (Final)
Score	Televote	Jury
12 points	Serbia	Australia
10 points	Ukraine	Czech Republic
8 points	Russia	France
7 points	Sweden	Israel
6 points	Austria	Russia
5 points	Australia	Hungary
4 points	Poland	Armenia
3 points	Hungary	Italy
2 points	France	Serbia
1 point	Bulgaria	Cyprus

==== Detailed voting results ====
The following members comprised the Croatian jury:

- Duško Mandić (jury chairperson) – music producer
- Boris Đurđević – music producer
- Damir Kedžo – singer, later selected to represent Croatia in the cancelled 2020 contest
- Pamela Ramljak – singer, represented Bosnia and Herzegovina in the 2005 contest and Croatia in the 2010 contest as member of Feminnem
- Kim Verson – singer

Detailed voting results from Croatia (Semi-final 1)
R/O	Country	Jury							Televote	
R/O	Country	D. Mandić	B. Đurđević	D. Kedžo	P. Ramljak	K. Verson	Rank	Points	Rank	Points
01	Finland	8	12	15	11	15	14		15	
02	Greece	17	16	17	17	16	17		17	
03	Moldova	15	10	11	9	10	11		16	
04	Hungary	5	7	5	2	3	3	8	3	8
05	Croatia									
06	Netherlands	1	15	8	16	5	9	2	6	5
07	Armenia	12	3	7	3	7	6	5	8	3
08	San Marino	16	14	16	10	9	15		12	
09	Russia	11	2	3	5	8	5	6	2	10
10	Czech Republic	7	1	1	1	1	1	12	7	4
11	Cyprus	4	5	2	7	2	2	10	9	2
12	Austria	10	13	13	13	12	13		4	7
13	Estonia	9	9	12	15	14	12		14	
14	Azerbaijan	6	6	6	8	11	8	3	13	
15	Montenegro	14	17	14	14	17	16		5	6
16	Iceland	3	11	10	12	13	10	1	11	
17	Bosnia and Herzegovina	13	4	9	4	6	7	4	1	12
18	Malta	2	8	4	6	4	4	7	10	1

Detailed voting results from Croatia (Final)
R/O	Country	Jury							Televote	
R/O	Country	D. Mandić	B. Đurđević	D. Kedžo	P. Ramljak	K. Verson	Rank	Points	Rank	Points
01	Belgium	6	18	18	15	6	12		18	
02	Czech Republic	18	7	2	1	2	2	10	20	
03	Netherlands	1	21	13	21	9	14		15	
04	Azerbaijan	17	9	20	9	20	19		14	
05	Hungary	11	15	12	2	3	6	5	8	3
06	Italy	5	3	5	17	16	8	3	11	
07	Israel	3	8	6	8	12	4	7	22	
08	Bulgaria	25	16	19	16	15	20		10	1
09	Sweden	10	19	7	19	17	18		4	7
10	Germany	14	23	25	25	25	24		16	
11	France	2	4	11	10	7	3	8	9	2
12	Poland	16	10	21	18	5	17		7	4
13	Australia	4	6	8	4	1	1	12	6	5
14	Cyprus	9	17	10	11	4	10	1	13	
15	Serbia	12	11	4	7	14	9	2	1	12
16	Lithuania	8	20	14	14	11	15		23	
17	Croatia									
18	Russia	19	2	3	6	10	5	6	3	8
19	Spain	22	22	22	20	21	22		19	
20	Latvia	23	5	15	5	8	11		17	
21	Ukraine	24	12	1	12	19	16		2	10
22	Malta	7	14	16	13	13	13		24	
23	Georgia	21	25	23	24	24	25		21	
24	Austria	20	13	17	22	22	21		5	6
25	United Kingdom	13	24	24	23	23	23		25	
26	Armenia	15	1	9	3	18	7	4	12	
