= Lithuania in the Eurovision Song Contest 2016 =

- Eurovision Song Contest 2016
- Country: Lithuania
- Selection process: "Eurovizijos" dainų konkurso nacionalinė atranka
- Selection date: 12 March 2016

Competing entry
- Song: "I've Been Waiting for This Night"
- Artist: Donny Montell
- Songwriters: Jonas Thander; Beatrice Robertsson

Placement
- Semi-final result: Qualified (4th, 222 points)
- Final result: 9th, 200 points

Participation chronology

Lithuania was represented at the Eurovision Song Contest 2016 with the song "I've Been Waiting for This Night", written by Jonas Thander and Beatrice Robertsson. The song was performed by Donny Montell, who previously represented Lithuania in the 2012 contest with the song "Love Is Blind", placing 14th in the final. The Lithuanian broadcaster Lithuanian National Radio and Television (LRT) organised the national final "Eurovizijos" dainų konkurso nacionalinė atranka (Eurovision Song Contest national selection) in order to select the Lithuanian entry for the 2016 contest in Stockholm, Sweden. The national final took place over 10 weeks and involved 28 artists competing in two different competitive streams: artists that applied with a song and artists who didn't have a song, who were then matched with a song from the song submissions LRT received. The results of each show were determined by a combination of votes from a jury panel and a public vote. In the final, six artists and songs remained, and "I've Been Waiting For This Night" performed by Donny Montell was selected as the winner.

Lithuania was drawn to compete in the second semi-final of the Eurovision Song Contest which took place on 12 May 2016. Performing during the show in position 9, "I've Been Waiting for This Night" was announced among the top 10 entries of the second semi-final and therefore qualified to compete in the final on 14 May. It was later revealed that Lithuania placed fourth out of the 18 participating countries in the semi-final with 222 points. In the final, Lithuania performed in position 16 and placed ninth out of the 26 participating countries, scoring 200 points.

== Background ==
Prior to the 2016 contest, Lithuania had participated in the Eurovision Song Contest 16 times since its first entry in 1994. The nation’s best placing in the contest was sixth, which it achieved in 2006 with the song "We Are the Winners", performed by LT United. Following the introduction of semi-finals for the 2004, Lithuania, to this point, had managed to qualify to the final seven times. In the 2015 contest, "This Time" performed by Monika Linkytė and Vaidas Baumila qualified to the final, where the song scored 30 points and placed 18th.

For the 2016 contest, the Lithuanian national broadcaster, Lithuanian National Radio and Television (LRT), broadcast the event within Lithuania and organised the selection process for the nation's entry. Other than the internal selection of their debut entry in 1994, Lithuania has selected their entry consistently through a national final procedure. LRT confirmed their intentions to participate at the 2016 Eurovision Song Contest on 13 July 2015. On 6 October 2015, the broadcaster announced the organization of "Eurovizijos" dainų konkurso nacionalinė atranka, which would be the national final to select Lithuania's entry for Stockholm.

== Before Eurovision ==
=== "Eurovizijos" dainų konkurso nacionalinė atranka ===
"Eurovizijos" dainų konkurso nacionalinė atranka (Eurovision Song Contest national selection) was the national final format developed by LRT in order to select Lithuania's entry for the Eurovision Song Contest 2016. The competition involved a ten-week-long process that commenced on 9 January 2016 and concluded with a winning song and artist on 12 March 2016. The 10 shows took place at the LRT studios in Vilnius and were hosted by Andrius Rožickas and Gerūta Griniūtė. The shows were broadcast on LRT televizija, LRT Lituanica, and LRT Radijas, as well as online via the broadcaster's website lrt.lt. The final was also streamed online on the official Eurovision Song Contest website eurovision.tv.

==== Format ====
The Lithuanian broadcaster overhauled the format of the national final from that of previous years. For the 2016 competition, entries initially competed in two different subgroups: artists that entered without a song and artists that entered with a song. Artists that entered with a song were higher in number (16), and therefore two shows consisting of eight entries each were held on 9 and 16 January, resulting in the elimination of six entries all together. The remaining 10 entries participated in an additional two shows on 30 January and 13 February, where first two, and then three of the entries were eliminated, leaving five entries remaining in the group. The remaining 12 artists applied without a song and were matched with songs that LRT received during the submission period. An initial show was organised for this subgroup on 30 January, resulting in the elimination of two entries. The remaining 10 entries in this group participated in an additional two shows on 6 and 20 February, where first two, and then three, of the entries were eliminated, leaving five entries remaining in the group. During the eighth show, the remaining five entries from each group participated together for the first time and the bottom two entries were eliminated, while the remaining eight entries advanced to the competition's semi-final. In the semi-final, an additional two entries were eliminated and the top six proceeded to the final. In the final, the winner was selected from the remaining six entries.

The results of each of the 10 shows were determined by the 50/50 combination of votes from a jury panel and public televoting. The ranking developed by both streams of voting was converted to points from 1-8, 10 and 12 and assigned based on the number of competing songs in the respective show. During the first eight shows and the final, the jury votes consisted of a combination of a Lithuanian jury panel and an international jury panel. For the semi-final, the jury votes were determined by a Lithuanian panel only. The public could vote through telephone and SMS voting. Initially, ties in all shows but the final were to be decided in favour of the entry that received the most votes from the public, however, during some shows, ties were decided in favour of the entry that received the most points from the jury, while in the final, a tie would be decided in favour of the entry that was awarded the most points by the jury.

==== Competing entries ====
On 6 October 2015, LRT opened two separate submission forms: one for artists and another for songwriters to submit their songs. Artists that applied to compete with a song were required to indicate which song they wanted to compete with on their application. The submission deadline for both applications concluded on 1 December 2015. On 21 December 2015, LRT announced the 28 artists selected for the competition during a press conference. Among the artists were previous Lithuanian Eurovision contestants Erica Jennings, who represented Lithuania in 2001 as part of Skamp, and Donny Montell, who represented the nation in 2012. On 19 January 2016, the final changes to the list of 28 competing acts were made with the addition of Dovydas Petrošius and Evelyn Joyce to the list of performers and the withdrawal of the girl group HIT and singer Gabrielė Grygolaitytė-Vasha. Singer Aistė Pilvelytė was originally assigned to perform the song "You Can't Leave Me Now" written by Niklas Bergvist, however, she later opted to switch her song. Eglė Jakštytė originally entered the competition with "Leisk dar būti", a song entirely in Lithuanian, but she decided to translate the song to English after the second show.

Artist	Song	Songwriter(s)
4 Roses	"Butterfly"	Calle Kindbom, Dan Fernström, Viktor Brunö
Aistė Pilvelytė	"You Bet"	Rafael Artesero, Aistė Pilvelytė
Alice Way	"Hero"	Vaida Kalkauskaitė, Leon Somov
Baiba	"Mayday"	Daniel Persson, Magnus Mikaelsson
Behind the Moon	"Did It All"	Ugnė Kudlaitė
Berta Timinskaitė	"Stars in a Rainbow"	Aidan O'Connor, Claus Christensen, Mikael Nordmark, Matilde Hemmingsen
Catrinah	"Be Free"	Jekaterina Pranevič, Vitalij Rodevič, Pavel Rodevič
Deividas Žygas	"Survivors"	Ylva Persson, Linda Persson, William Taylor
Donny Montell	"I've Been Waiting for This Night"	Jonas Thander, Beatrice Robertsson
Dovydas Petrošius	"Starlight"	Oleg Jerochin
E.G.O.	"Long Way from Home"	Erik Dahlqvist, Aidan O'Connor, Göran Frid, Linda Dahl, Peter Dahl, Jimmy Glavå
Eglė Jakštytė	"Leisk dar būti"	Eglė Jakštytė, Marius Matulevičius
Eglė Jakštytė	"Let Me Show You"	Eglė Jakštytė, Marius Matulevičius, Andrius Kairys
Elena Jurgaitytė	"I Won't Come Back"	Elena Jurgaitytė, Viktorija Šatkutė
Erica Jennings	"Leading Me Home"	Erica Jennings
Evelyn Joyce	"When It Sings"	Franz Bengtsson, Hans Olov Furberg
Ieva Zasimauskaitė	"Life (Not That Beautiful)"	Joacim Dubbelman, Andreas Karlsson, Daniel Ström, Magnus Öunapuu, Mats Lekman
Ištvan Kvik and Ellada	"Please Don't Cry"	Brandon Stone
Jurgis Brūzga	"Hold On"	Jurgis Brūzga, Akmėja Brūzgė
Lawreigna	"Falling"	Philip Bloom
Milda Martinkėnaitė	"If Tomorrow Never Comes"	Joacim Dubbelman, Håkan Glänte
Neringa Šiaudikytė	"Never Knew Love"	Tina Almqvist Hilli, Daniel Persson
Petunija	"Tomorrow"	Vilius Tamošaitis – GeraiGerai, Agnė Šiaulytė
Ruslanas Kirilkinas	"In My World"	Niklas Bergqvist
Ruslanas Kirilkinas	"Ilgiuosi"	Niklas Bergqvist, Arūnas Valinskas
Rūta Ščiogolevaitė	"United"	Rūta Ščiogolevaitė, Michael James Down, Primož Poglajen, Thomas Reil, Jeppe Reil
Saulenė Chlevickaitė	"Strong"	Aidan O'Connor, Fred Endresen
Ugne Smile	"You Don't Know"	Ugnė Kudlaitė
Valdas Lacko	"Stay Tonight"	Valdas Lacko, Paulius Jasiūnas, Monika Ratomskytė
Vlad Max	"Don't Wanna Let It Go"	Silver Darter

==== Jury members ====
The Lithuanian jury panel consisted of four members in the elimination shows, five members in the semi-final, and six members in the final. The international jury panel in the elimination shows and the final consisted of three members.

Lithuanian jury members by show
Jury member	Elimination shows								Semi-final	Final	Occupation(s)
Jury member	1	2	3	4	5	6	7	8	Semi-final	Final	Occupation(s)
Dalia Ibelhauptaitė	No	No	No	No	No	No	Yes	No	No	No	director, playwright
Dalia Michelevičiūtė	Yes	No	No	No	No	No	No	No	Yes	Yes	actress
Darius Užkuraitis	Yes	Yes	Yes	Yes	Yes	Yes	Yes	Yes	Yes	No	LRT Opus director
Donatas Ulvydas	Yes	No	No	No	No	No	No	No	No	No	director
Gintaras Rinkevičius	No	No	No	No	Yes	No	No	No	No	No	director
Justė Arlauskaitė	No	No	No	No	No	No	No	Yes	Yes	Yes	singer
Kazimieras Šiaulys	No	No	No	Yes	No	No	No	No	No	No	music critic, journalist
Laima Lapkauskaitė	No	No	Yes	Yes	No	No	No	No	No	No	producer
Nomeda Kazlaus	No	Yes	Yes	No	No	Yes	Yes	Yes	No	Yes	opera singer
Olegas Aleksejevas	No	No	No	No	Yes	No	No	No	No	No	member of the group Biplan
Ramūnas Zilnys	Yes	Yes	Yes	Yes	Yes	Yes	Yes	Yes	Yes	Yes	music reviewer
Tomas Sinickis	No	No	No	No	No	No	No	No	Yes	Yes	musician, singer-songwriter
Vaidas Baumila	No	Yes	No	No	No	No	No	No	No	Yes	singer
Valdas Burnys	No	No	No	No	No	Yes	No	No	No	No	member of the group Išjunk šviesą

International jury members by show
Jury member	Country	Elimination shows								Semi-final	Final	Occupation(s)
Jury member	Country	1	2	3	4	5	6	7	8	Semi-final	Final	Occupation(s)
Brainstorm	Latvia	No	No	No	No	No	No	No	Yes	—N/a	No	music band
Dave Holmes	United Kingdom	Yes	No	Yes	No	Yes	No	No	Yes	—N/a	No	guitarist
Denis Ingoldsby	United Kingdom	Yes	No	Yes	No	Yes	No	Yes	No	—N/a	Yes	producer
Karl Frierson	United States	No	Yes	No	Yes	No	No	Yes	No	—N/a	No	member of the jazz ensemble De-Phazz
Karlis Auzans	Latvia	No	No	No	No	Yes	Yes	No	No	—N/a	No	musician, composer
Peter Freudenthaler	Germany	Yes	Yes	No	Yes	No	Yes	No	No	—N/a	Yes	lead singer of the group Fools Garden
Syron	United Kingdom	No	Yes	No	Yes	No	Yes	No	No	—N/a	Yes	singer
Vanessa Lancaster	United Kingdom	No	No	Yes	No	No	No	No	No	—N/a	No	vocalist for the ensemble Touch and Go
Will Wells	United States	No	No	No	No	No	No	Yes	Yes	—N/a	No	producer, musician, touring member of Imagine Dragons

==== Shows ====
===== Elimination shows =====
The eight elimination shows of the competition aired between 9 January and 27 February 2016 and featured the 28 competing entries. The first, second, fourth, and sixth show featured artists who already had a song when they applied to compete, while the third, fifth, and seventh show featured artists that did not have songs when they applied to compete. The eighth show featured all remaining entries in the competition. The bottom three entries of the first two shows were eliminated, while two were eliminated between the third to fifth shows, three were eliminated in the sixth and seventh shows and two were eliminated following the eighth show. 2000 Latvian entrant Brainstorm performed as the interval act during the seventh show.

Show 1 – 9 January 2016
R/O	Artist	Song	Jury				Televote		Total	Place
R/O	Artist	Song	Lithuanian	Intl.	Total	Points	Votes	Points	Total	Place
1	Alice Way	"Hero"	8	5	13	8	343	6	14	5
2	Dovydas Petrošius	"Starlight"	5	6	11	7	308	5	12	6
3	Behind the Moon	"Did It All"	7	8	15	10	357	7	17	4
4	Erica Jennings	"Leading Me Home"	12	10	22	12	720	8	20	2
5	Elena Jurgaitytė	"I Won't Come Back"	4	4	8	6	237	4	10	7
6	Vlad Max	"Don't Wanna Let It Go"	3	3	6	5	109	3	8	8
7	Petunija	"Tomorrow"	6	7	13	8	794	10	18	3
8	Donny Montell	"I've Been Waiting for This Night"	10	12	22	12	1,418	12	24	1

Detailed International Jury Votes
R/O	Song	P. Freudenthaler	D. Ingoldsby	D. Holmes	Total	Points
1	"Hero"	4	6	5	15	5
2	"Starlight"	6	5	7	18	6
3	"Did It All"	8	7	8	23	8
4	"Leading Me Home"	10	10	12	32	10
5	"I Won't Come Back"	7	3	4	14	4
6	"Don't Wanna Let It Go"	3	4	3	10	3
7	"Tomorrow"	5	8	6	19	7
8	"I've Been Waiting for This Night"	12	12	10	34	12

Show 2 – 16 January 2016
R/O	Artist	Song	Jury				Televote		Total	Place
R/O	Artist	Song	Lithuanian	Intl.	Total	Points	Votes	Points	Total	Place
1	Jurgis Brūzga	"Hold On"	8	4	12	6	506	5	11	6
2	Ugne Smile	"You Don't Know"	4	6	10	5	145	3	8	8
3	Lawreigna	"Falling"	5	5	10	5	153	4	9	7
4	Ištvan Kvik and Ellada	"Please Don't Cry"	7	6	13	7	1,004	10	17	2
5	Catrinah	"Be Free"	10	7	17	10	898	7	17	3
6	Eglė Jakštytė	"Leisk dar būti"	6	8	14	8	636	6	14	5
7	Valdas Lacko	"Stay Tonight"	3	10	13	7	945	8	15	4
8	Rūta Ščiogolevaitė	"United"	12	12	24	12	2,139	12	24	1

Detailed International Jury Votes
R/O	Song	P. Freudenthaler	Syron	K. Frierson	Total	Points
1	"Hold On"	4	3	5	12	4
2	"You Don't Know"	10	4	3	17	6
3	"Falling"	6	5	4	15	5
4	"Please Don't Cry"	5	6	6	17	6
5	"Be Free"	3	12	7	22	7
6	"Leisk dar būti"	7	8	8	23	8
7	"Stay Tonight"	8	7	10	25	10
8	"United"	12	10	12	34	12

Show 3 – 23 January 2016
R/O	Artist	Song	Jury				Televote		Total	Place
R/O	Artist	Song	Lithuanian	Intl.	Total	Points	Votes	Points	Total	Place
1	Ieva Zasimauskaitė	"Life (Not That Beautiful)"	6	12	18	10	463	5	15	3
2	Baiba	"Mayday"	4	3	7	3	180	1	4	10
3	Evelyn Joyce	"When It Sings"	4	0	4	2	160	0	2	11
4	E.G.O.	"Long Way from Home"	2	8	10	5	303	3	8	9
5	Berta Timinskaitė	"Stars in a Rainbow"	5	6	11	6	464	6	12	5
6	Deividas Žygas	"Survivors"	0	0	0	0	98	0	0	12
7	Neringa Šiaudikytė	"Never Knew Love"	8	4	12	7	204	2	9	8
8	4 Roses	"Butterfly"	1	10	11	6	457	4	10	7
9	Saulenė Chlevickaitė	"Strong"	3	6	9	4	712	7	11	6
10	Milda Martinkėnaitė	"If Tomorrow Never Comes"	7	4	11	6	895	8	14	4
11	Ruslanas Kirilkinas	"In My World"	10	5	15	8	1,112	10	18	2
12	Aistė Pilvelytė	"You Bet"	12	7	19	12	1,819	12	24	1

Detailed International Jury Votes
R/O	Song	V. Lancaster	D. Holmes	D. Ingoldsby	Total	Points
1	"Life (Not That Beautiful)"	12	10	10	32	12
2	"Mayday"	3	7	1	11	3
3	"When It Sings"				0	0
4	"Long Way from Home"	10	8	2	20	8
5	"Stars in a Rainbow"	7	4	4	15	6
6	"Survivors"				0	0
7	"Never Knew Love"	2	3	7	12	4
8	"Butterfly"	4	12	8	24	10
9	"Strong"	8	1	6	15	6
10	"If Tomorrow Never Comes"	1	6	5	12	4
11	"In My World"	6	5	3	14	5
12	"You Bet"	5	2	12	19	7

Show 4 – 30 January 2016
R/O	Artist	Song	Jury				Televote		Total	Place
R/O	Artist	Song	Lithuanian	Intl.	Total	Points	Votes	Points	Total	Place
1	Catrinah	"Be Free"	6	8	14	7	1,293	7	14	4
2	Erica Jennings	"Leading Me Home"	10	7	17	8	1,340	8	16	3
3	Behind the Moon	"Did It All"	5	3	8	4	298	2	6	9
4	Alice Way	"Hero"	4	2	6	3	228	1	4	10
5	Rūta Ščiogolevaitė	"United"	12	10	22	10	1,838	12	22	2
6	Valdas Lacko	"Stay Tonight"	5	5	10	5	990	6	11	6
7	Petunija	"Tomorrow"	5	6	11	6	453	3	9	8
8	Donny Montell	"I've Been Waiting for This Night"	12	12	24	12	1,578	10	22	1
9	Eglė Jakštytė	"Let Me Show You"	7	4	11	6	482	4	10	7
10	Ištvan Kvik and Ellada	"Please Don't Cry"	8	6	14	7	678	5	12	5

Detailed International Jury Votes
R/O	Song	P. Freudenthaler	Syron	K. Frierson	Total	Points
1	"Be Free"	12	5	6	23	8
2	"Leading Me Home"	7	8	5	20	7
3	"Did It All"	6	1	1	8	3
4	"Hero"	2	2	3	7	2
5	"United"	8	10	12	30	10
6	"Stay Tonight"	3	3	8	14	5
7	"Tomorrow"	5	6	4	15	6
8	"I've Been Waiting for This Night"	10	12	10	32	12
9	"Let Me Show You"	1	7	2	10	4
10	"Please Don't Cry"	4	4	7	15	6

Show 5 – 6 February 2016
R/O	Artist	Song	Jury				Televote		Total	Place
R/O	Artist	Song	Lithuanian	Intl.	Total	Points	Votes	Points	Total	Place
1	Baiba	"Mayday"	1	7	8	4	167	1	5	10
2	Berta Timinskaitė	"Stars in a Rainbow"	3	5	8	4	399	4	8	9
3	Ieva Zasimauskaitė	"Life (Not That Beautiful)"	6	12	18	10	413	5	15	3
4	Neringa Šiaudikytė	"Never Knew Love"	8	6	14	7	180	2	9	7
5	4 Roses	"Butterfly"	7	10	17	8	484	6	14	4
6	Ruslanas Kirilkinas	"In My World"	10	4	14	7	986	10	17	2
7	Aistė Pilvelytė	"You Bet"	12	8	20	12	1,682	12	24	1
8	Saulenė Chlevickaitė	"Strong"	5	5	10	6	635	8	14	5
9	Milda Martinkėnaitė	"If Tomorrow Never Comes"	2	3	5	3	566	7	10	6
10	E.G.O.	"Long Way from Home"	4	5	9	5	265	3	8	8

Detailed International Jury Votes
R/O	Song	D. Ingoldsby	K. Auzans	D. Holmes	Total	Points
1	"Mayday"	6	10	2	18	7
2	"Stars in a Rainbow"	1	6	5	12	5
3	"Life (Not That Beautiful)"	8	12	10	30	12
4	"Never Knew Love"	10	4	8	17	6
5	"Butterfly"	7	8	12	27	10
6	"In My World"	4	1	6	11	4
7	"You Bet"	12	7	7	26	8
8	"Strong"	3	5	4	12	5
9	"If Tomorrow Never Comes"	5	3	1	9	3
10	"Long Way from Home"	2	2	8	12	5

Show 6 – 13 February 2016
R/O	Artist	Song	Jury				Televote		Total	Place
R/O	Artist	Song	Lithuanian	Intl.	Total	Points	Votes	Points	Total	Place
1	Valdas Lacko	"Stay Tonight"	5	6	11	7	1,348	8	15	4
2	Catrinah	"Be Free"	7	7	14	8	1,102	6	14	5
3	Ištvan Kvik and Ellada	"Please Don't Cry"	8	3	11	7	729	5	12	6
4	Donny Montell	"I've Been Waiting for This Night"	12	12	24	12	1,234	7	19	3
5	Eglė Jakštytė	"Let Me Show You"	6	4	10	6	622	4	10	7
6	Erica Jennings	"Leading Me Home"	10	10	20	10	1,474	10	20	2
7	Petunija	"Tomorrow"	5	5	10	6	508	3	9	8
8	Rūta Ščiogolevaitė	"United"	12	8	20	10	1,808	12	22	1

Detailed International Jury Votes
R/O	Song	P. Freudenthaler	K. Auzans	Syron	Total	Points
1	"Stay Tonight"	6	10	4	20	6
2	"Be Free"	10	7	7	24	7
3	"Please Don't Cry"	4	3	3	10	3
4	"I've Been Waiting for This Night"	12	5	12	29	12
5	"Let Me Show You"	5	4	5	14	4
6	"Leading Me Home"	8	12	8	28	10
7	"Tomorrow"	3	6	6	15	5
8	"United"	7	8	10	25	8

Show 7 – 20 February 2016
R/O	Artist	Song	Jury				Televote		Total	Place
R/O	Artist	Song	Lithuanian	Intl.	Total	Points	Votes	Points	Total	Place
1	E.G.O.	"Long Way from Home"	4	5	9	5	315	3	8	8
2	4 Roses	"Butterfly"	5	4	9	5	763	7	12	6
3	Ieva Zasimauskaitė	"Life (Not That Beautiful)"	7	12	19	10	844	8	18	2
4	Aistė Pilvelytė	"You Bet"	12	10	22	12	1,577	12	24	1
5	Ruslanas Kirilkinas	"In My World"	10	7	17	8	988	10	18	3
6	Milda Martinkėnaitė	"If Tomorrow Never Comes"	5	5	10	6	686	6	12	5
7	Neringa Šiaudikytė	"Never Knew Love"	8	6	14	7	524	4	11	7
8	Saulenė Chlevickaitė	"Strong"	6	8	14	7	644	5	12	4

Detailed International Jury Votes
R/O	Song	W. Wells	D. Ingoldsby	K. Frierson	Total	Points
1	"Long Way from Home"	5	5	7	17	5
2	"Butterfly"	3	8	4	15	4
3	"Life (Not That Beautiful)"	12	6	12	30	12
4	"You Bet"	10	12	3	25	10
5	"In My World"	6	4	10	20	7
6	"If Tomorrow Never Comes"	8	3	6	17	5
7	"Never Knew Love"	4	10	5	19	6
8	"Strong"	7	7	8	22	8

Show 8 – 27 February 2016
R/O	Artist	Song	Jury				Televote		Total	Place
R/O	Artist	Song	Lithuanian	Intl.	Total	Points	Votes	Points	Total	Place
1	Catrinah	"Be Free"	5	4	9	5	1,042	4	9	7
2	Ruslanas Kirilkinas	"In My World"	6	7	13	7	1,042	4	11	6
3	Milda Martinkėnaitė	"If Tomorrow Never Comes"	3	6	9	5	839	2	7	9
4	Erica Jennings	"Leading Me Home"	8	6	14	8	2,214	8	16	3
5	Saulenė Chlevickaitė	"Strong"	2	3	5	4	643	1	5	10
6	Aistė Pilvelytė	"You Bet"	10	8	18	10	1,830	7	17	2
7	Valdas Lacko	"Stay Tonight"	1	3	4	3	1,211	5	8	8
8	Rūta Ščiogolevaitė	"United"	7	5	12	6	2,287	10	16	4
9	Donny Montell	"I've Been Waiting for This Night"	12	12	24	12	2,309	12	24	1
10	Ieva Zasimauskaitė	"Life (Not That Beautiful)"	4	10	14	8	1,474	6	14	5

Detailed International Jury Votes
R/O	Song	W. Wells	D. Holmes	Brainstorm	Total	Points
1	"Be Free"	2	7	1	10	4
2	"In My World"	6	4	7	17	7
3	"If Tomorrow Never Comes"	5	5	6	16	6
4	"Leading Me Home"	4	8	4	16	6
5	"Strong"	3	1	2	6	3
6	"You Bet"	8	6	12	26	8
7	"Stay Tonight"	1	2	3	6	3
8	"United"	7	3	5	15	5
9	"I've Been Waiting for This Night"	10	12	10	32	12
10	"Life (Not That Beautiful)"	12	10	8	30	10

===== Semi-final =====
The semi-final of the competition took place on 5 March 2016 and featured the remaining eight entries that qualified from the eighth show. The semi-final was the first show in the competition to be broadcast live; all other preceding shows were pre-recorded earlier in the week before their airdates. The top six entries advanced to the final, while the bottom two were eliminated. In addition to the performances of the competing entries, Vidas Bareikis performed as the interval act.

Semi-final – 5 March 2016
R/O	Artist	Song	Jury	Televote		Total	Place
R/O	Artist	Song	Jury	Votes	Points	Total	Place
1	Ieva Zasimauskaitė	"Life (Not That Beautiful)"	6	1,843	6	12	5
2	Valdas Lacko	"Stay Tonight"	3	1,102	3	6	8
3	Catrinah	"Be Free"	4	1,307	4	8	7
4	Erica Jennings	"Leading Me Home"	12	3,021	12	24	1
5	Donny Montell	"I've Been Waiting for This Night"	10	2,727	10	20	2
6	Aistė Pilvelytė	"You Bet"	7	1,911	7	14	4
7	Ruslanas Kirilkinas	"In My World"	5	1,385	5	10	6
8	Rūta Ščiogolevaitė	"United"	8	2,374	8	16	3

===== Final =====
The final of the competition took place on 12 March 2016 and featured the remaining six entries that qualified from the semi-final. "I've Been Waiting for This Night" performed by Donny Montell was selected as the winner after gaining the most points from both the jury vote and the public vote. In addition to the performances of the competing entries, Vaidas Baumila and Monika Linkytė opened the show with the 2015 Lithuanian entry "This Time", and juror Syron performed as the interval act.

Final – 12 March 2016
R/O	Artist	Song	Jury	Televote		Total	Place
R/O	Artist	Song	Jury	Votes	Points	Total	Place
1	Ruslanas Kirilkinas	"Ilgiuosi"	5	1,756	5	10	6
2	Ieva Zasimauskaitė	"Life (Not That Beautiful)"	7	3,558	6	13	4
3	Aistė Pilvelytė	"You Bet"	6	4,826	7	13	5
4	Erica Jennings	"Leading Me Home"	10	13,854	10	20	2
5	Rūta Ščiogolevaitė	"United"	8	7,293	8	16	3
6	Donny Montell	"I've Been Waiting for This Night"	12	18,962	12	24	1

=== Preparation ===
Following Donny Montell's win during the Lithuanian national final, discussions began in regards to the staging of the song with choreographer Sacha Jean-Baptiste. Baptiste also directed Montell's music video for "I've Been Waiting for this Night", which was released earlier on 4 December 2015. Montell flew to Sweden in late March and throughout April to rehearse the choreography, which included tests for a jump performed on a trampoline.

On 28 March, LRT broadcast the support concert Būkime kartu, where Lithuanian viewers could call to donate funds to support the Lithuanian Eurovision participation. The concert was filmed on 26 March at the Žalgiris Arena in Kaunas and featured guests Edgaras Montvidas, Gytis Valickas, and the 2015 Lithuanian Eurovision entrants Monika Linkytė and Vaidas Baumila. The concert raised €10,004 from public donations, with phone lines remaining open until 31 March for additional donations.

=== Promotion ===
Donny Montell focused his promotional efforts in the lead up to the Eurovision Song Contest within Lithuania. Montell performed a concert tour of Lithuania to promote his album #BLCK, which was released on 14 April 2016. In addition to his concerts, Montell recorded a performance of "I've Been Waiting for This Night" for the LRT programme Dainų dainelė, which aired on 10 April, and he performed a show on 15 April for Lithuanian and NATO troops at the Lithuanian Air Force Aviation Base in Šiauliai.

In addition to his appearances within Lithuania, Donny Montell also promoted "I've Been Waiting for This Night" between 11 and 13 April by taking part in promotional activities in Tel Aviv, Israel, and performing during the Israel Calling event held at the Ha'teatron venue.

== At Eurovision ==
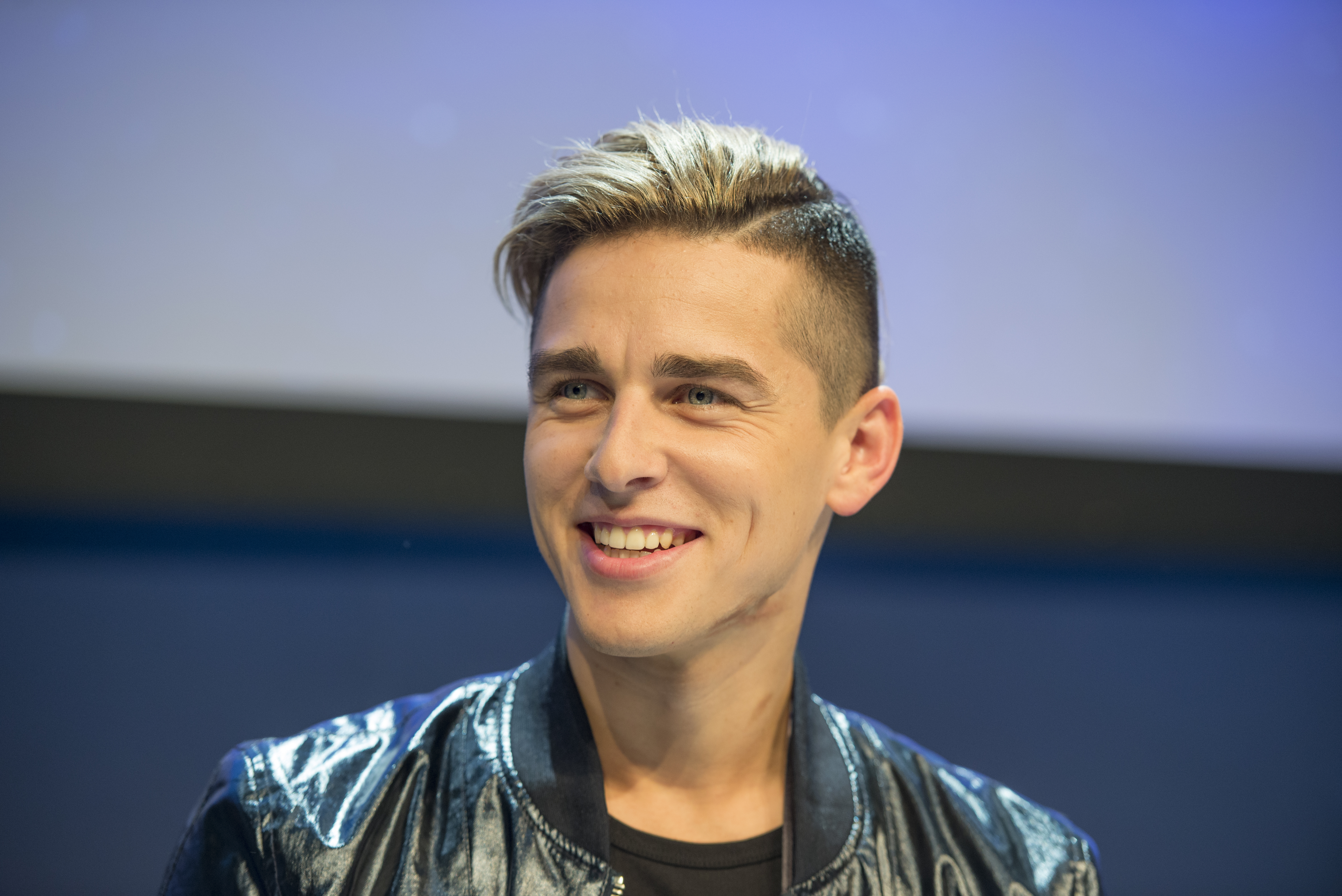
Donny Montell during a press meet and greet

According to Eurovision rules, all nations with the exceptions of the host country and the "Big Five" (France, Germany, Italy, Spain and the United Kingdom) are required to qualify from one of two semi-finals in order to compete for the final; the top 10 countries from each semi-final progress to the final. The European Broadcasting Union (EBU) split up the competing countries into six different pots based on voting patterns from previous contests, with countries with favourable voting histories put into the same pot. On 25 January 2016, a special allocation draw was held which placed each country into one of the two semi-finals, as well as which half of the show they would perform in. Lithuania was placed into the second semi-final, to be held on 12 May 2016, and was scheduled to perform in the first half of the show.

Once all the competing songs for the 2016 contest had been released, the running order for the semi-finals was decided by the shows' producers rather than through another draw, so that similar songs were not placed next to each other. Lithuania was set to perform in position 9, following the entry from Macedonia and before the entry from Australia.

The two semi-finals and final were broadcast in Lithuania on LRT, LRT HD, and LRT Radijas with commentary by Darius Užkuraitis. LRT Kultūra also broadcast the three shows interpreted in International Sign for the deaf and sign language users. The Lithuanian spokesperson who announced the top 12-point score awarded by the Lithuanian jury during the final was Ugnė Galadauskaitė.

=== Semi-final ===
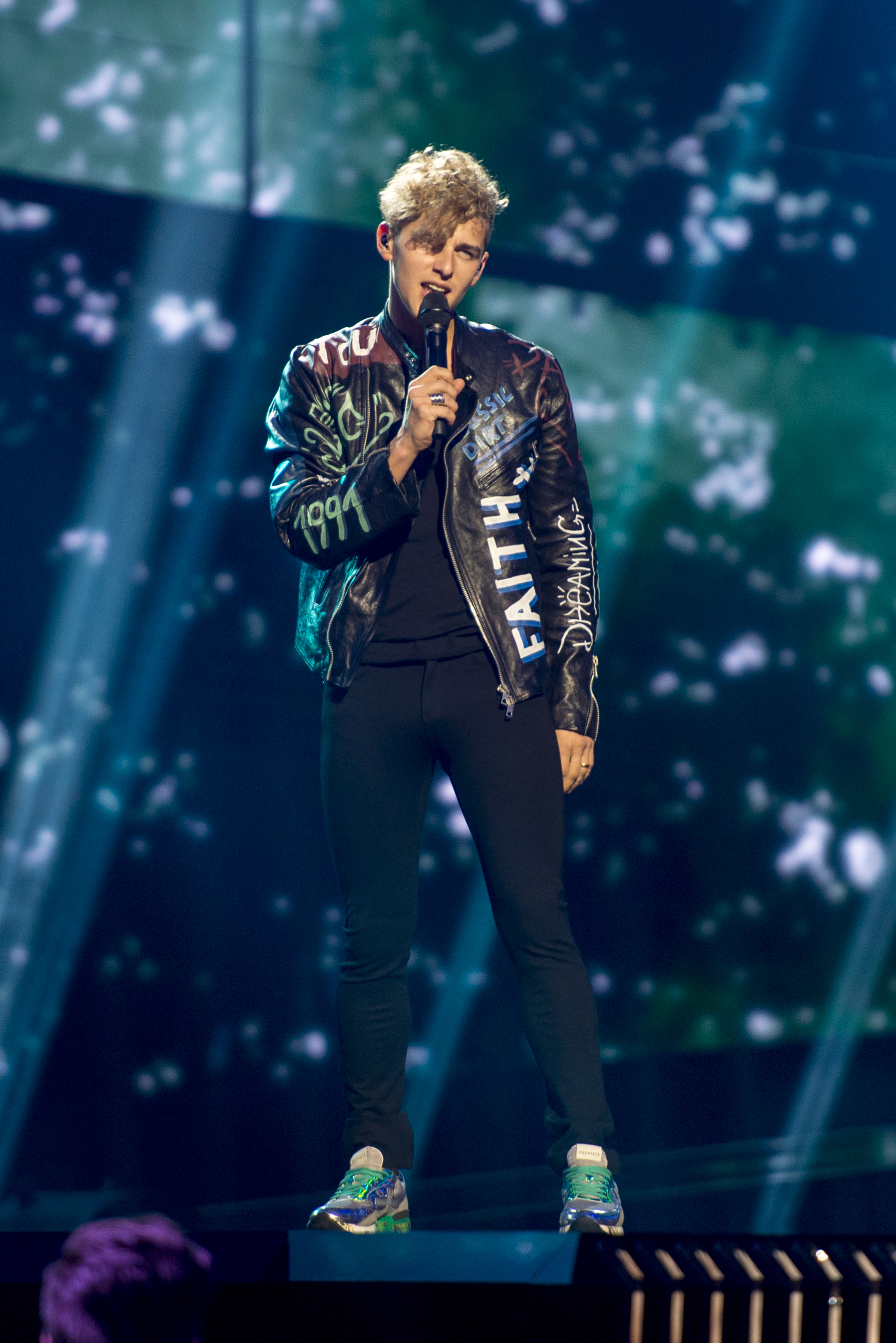
Donny Montell during a rehearsal before the second semi-final

Donny Montell took part in technical rehearsals on 4 and 7 May, followed by dress rehearsals on 11 and 12 May. This included the jury show on 11 May, where the professional juries of each country watched and voted on the competing entries.

The Lithuanian performance featured Donny Montell performing on stage alone with blue and green stage colours and the LED screens displaying stars. The performance also featured pyrotechnic effects and Montell using a trampoline prop to perform a jump. The stage director and choreographer for the Lithuanian performance was Sacha Jean-Baptiste. Donny Montell was joined by four off-stage backing vocalists: Justina Budaitė, Kotryna Juodzevičiūtė, Rasa Doniela, and Karolina Rasten.

At the end of the show, Lithuania was announced as having finished in the top 10 and subsequently qualifying for the grand final. It was later revealed that Lithuania placed fourth in the semi-final, receiving a total of 222 points: 118 points from the televoting and 104 points from the juries.

=== Final ===
Shortly after the second semi-final, a winners' press conference was held for the 10 qualifying countries. As part of this press conference, the qualifying artists took part in a draw to determine which half of the grand final they would subsequently participate in. This draw was done in the reverse order the countries appeared in the semi-final running order. Lithuania was drawn to compete in the second half. Following this draw, the shows' producers decided upon the running order of the final, as they had done for the semi-finals. Lithuania was subsequently placed to perform in position 16, following the entry from Serbia and before the entry from Croatia.

Donny Montell once again took part in dress rehearsals on 13 and 14 May before the final, including the jury final, where the professional juries cast their final votes before the live show. Donny Montell performed a repeat of his semi-final performance during the final on 14 May. Lithuania placed ninth in the final, scoring 200 points: 96 points from the televoting and 104 points from the juries, making it the second most successful result for Lithuania in the contest to date.

=== Voting ===
Voting during the three shows was conducted under a new system that involved each country now awarding two sets of points from 1-8, 10 and 12: one from their professional jury and the other from televoting. Each nation's jury consisted of five music industry professionals who are citizens of the country they represent, with their names published before the contest to ensure transparency. This jury judged each entry based on: vocal capacity; the stage performance; the song's composition and originality; and the overall impression by the act. In addition, no member of a national jury was permitted to be related in any way to any of the competing acts in such a way that they cannot vote impartially and independently. The individual rankings of each jury member as well as the nation's televoting results were released shortly after the grand final.

Below is a breakdown of points awarded to Lithuania and awarded by Lithuania in the second semi-final and grand final of the contest, and the breakdown of the jury voting and televoting conducted during the two shows:

==== Points awarded to Lithuania ====
Points awarded to Lithuania (Semi-final 2)
Score	Televote	Jury
12 points	Ireland; Norway; United Kingdom	Latvia
10 points	Belarus; Georgia; Latvia	Belarus; Denmark
8 points	Australia; Belgium	Norway; Switzerland; Ukraine; United Kingdom
7 points	Denmark	Australia
6 points	Ukraine	
5 points	Israel	Macedonia; Serbia
4 points	Albania; Germany; Italy	Israel
3 points	Bulgaria; Poland	Belgium; Bulgaria; Germany; Ireland; Poland
2 points		Georgia
1 point		Italy; Slovenia

Points awarded to Lithuania (Final)
Score	Televote	Jury
12 points	Ireland; Norway; United Kingdom	Ukraine
10 points		Belarus; Latvia
8 points	Latvia; San Marino	Serbia
7 points		Australia; Switzerland
6 points	Denmark; Sweden	Finland
5 points	Estonia; Georgia	Azerbaijan; Denmark; Estonia; Georgia
4 points	Albania; Iceland	Moldova; United Kingdom
3 points	Cyprus; Moldova; Ukraine	Czech Republic; Hungary
2 points	Italy; Montenegro	Norway; Poland; Sweden
1 point	Australia	Austria; Bulgaria; Germany; Israel

==== Points awarded by Lithuania ====
Points awarded by Lithuania (Semi-final 2)
Score	Televote	Jury
12 points	Latvia	Australia
10 points	Ukraine	Georgia
8 points	Georgia	Ukraine
7 points	Poland	Latvia
6 points	Belarus	Israel
5 points	Australia	Belgium
4 points	Belgium	Norway
3 points	Bulgaria	Poland
2 points	Norway	Bulgaria
1 point	Ireland	Slovenia

Points awarded by Lithuania (Final)
Score	Televote	Jury
12 points	Latvia	Australia
10 points	Ukraine	Georgia
8 points	Russia	Ukraine
7 points	Sweden	Latvia
6 points	Poland	Israel
5 points	Australia	Belgium
4 points	Georgia	Armenia
3 points	France	Poland
2 points	Hungary	Bulgaria
1 point	Austria	France

==== Detailed voting results ====
The following members comprised the Lithuanian jury:

- Nomeda Kazlaus (jury chairperson) – pianist, opera singer
- Vidas Bareikis – songwriter, vocal coach
- Justas Čekuolis – guitarist, songwriter, producer, musician
- Vytautas Lukočius – Conductor of Lithuanian chamber orchestra
- Eglė Nepaitė-Abaravičienė – music producer

Detailed voting results from Lithuania (Semi-final 2)
R/O	Country	Jury							Televote	
R/O	Country	N. Kazlaus	V. Bareikis	J. Čekuolis	V. Lukočius	E. Nepaitė-Abaravičienė	Rank	Points	Rank	Points
01	Latvia	4	4	5	3	5	4	7	1	12
02	Poland	7	14	9	8	13	8	3	4	7
03	Switzerland	15	9	15	12	16	16		13	
04	Israel	6	5	4	6	6	5	6	12	
05	Belarus	9	15	14	10	11	12		5	6
06	Serbia	16	10	13	11	10	13		17	
07	Ireland	14	12	10	13	14	15		10	1
08	Macedonia	17	17	17	15	17	17		15	
09	Lithuania									
10	Australia	1	2	2	2	1	1	12	6	5
11	Slovenia	10	7	12	14	15	10	1	14	
12	Bulgaria	11	13	16	5	9	9	2	8	3
13	Denmark	13	16	8	16	8	14		11	
14	Ukraine	2	1	3	7	3	3	8	2	10
15	Norway	8	6	6	9	12	7	4	9	2
16	Georgia	3	3	1	1	2	2	10	3	8
17	Albania	12	11	11	17	7	11		16	
18	Belgium	5	8	7	4	4	6	5	7	4

Detailed voting results from Lithuania (Final)
R/O	Country	Jury							Televote	
R/O	Country	N. Kazlaus	V. Bareikis	J. Čekuolis	V. Lukočius	E. Nepaitė-Abaravičienė	Rank	Points	Rank	Points
01	Belgium	7	7	6	7	4	6	5	13	
02	Czech Republic	8	15	24	18	15	17		24	
03	Netherlands	22	16	10	17	13	15		17	
04	Azerbaijan	11	24	23	19	9	20		18	
05	Hungary	23	11	8	20	23	19		9	2
06	Italy	13	8	15	21	6	11		15	
07	Israel	5	6	5	6	7	5	6	19	
08	Bulgaria	9	12	22	8	8	9	2	11	
09	Sweden	20	9	11	22	16	14		4	7
10	Germany	16	13	12	15	11	12		21	
11	France	14	20	13	5	10	10	1	8	3
12	Poland	6	19	9	11	14	8	3	5	6
13	Australia	1	2	2	1	1	1	12	6	5
14	Cyprus	24	21	14	23	24	24		14	
15	Serbia	17	14	21	16	12	18		25	
16	Lithuania									
17	Croatia	18	22	16	12	25	22		23	
18	Russia	25	25	25	25	22	25		3	8
19	Spain	15	18	17	9	21	16		16	
20	Latvia	4	3	4	3	5	4	7	1	12
21	Ukraine	3	1	3	4	2	3	8	2	10
22	Malta	12	10	18	13	20	13		22	
23	Georgia	2	4	1	2	3	2	10	7	4
24	Austria	19	23	19	24	19	23		10	1
25	United Kingdom	21	17	20	14	18	21		20	
26	Armenia	10	5	7	10	17	7	4	12	
