= Belgium in the Eurovision Song Contest 2016 =

- Eurovision Song Contest 2016
- Participating broadcaster: Vlaamse Radio- en Televisieomroeporganisatie (VRT)
- Country: Belgium
- Selection process: Eurosong 2016
- Selection date: 17 January 2016

Competing entry
- Song: "What's the Pressure"
- Artist: Laura Tesoro
- Songwriters: Sanne Putseys; Louis Favre; Birsen Uçar; Yannick Werther

Placement
- Semi-final result: Qualified (3rd, 274 points)
- Final result: 10th, 181 points

Participation chronology

Belgium was represented at the Eurovision Song Contest 2016 with the song "What's the Pressure", written by Sanne Putseys, Louis Favre, Birsen Uçar, and Yannick Werther, and performed by Laura Tesoro. The Belgian participating broadcaster, Flemish Vlaamse Radio- en Televisieomroeporganisatie (VRT), selected its entry for the contest through the national final Eurosong 2016. The competition featured five competing acts and consisted of two presentation shows and a final. In the final on 17 January 2016, the winner was selected over two rounds of voting: the first selected the top two via the votes of ten international jury groups and a public televote, while the second selected the winner solely by public televoting. "What's the Pressure" performed by Laura Tesoro was the winner after placing first during both rounds of voting.

Belgium was drawn to compete in the second semi-final of the Eurovision Song Contest which took place on 12 May 2016. Performing as the closing entry during the show in position 18, "What's the Pressure" was announced among the top 10 entries of the second semi-final and therefore qualified to compete in the final on 14 May. It was later revealed that Belgium placed third out of the 18 participating countries in the semi-final with 274 points. In the final, Belgium performed in position 1 and placed tenth out of the 26 participating countries, scoring 181 points.

== Background ==
Prior to the 2016 contest, Belgium had participated in the Eurovision Song Contest fifty-seven times since its debut as one of seven countries to take part in 1956. Since then, they have won the contest on one occasion in 1986 with the song "J'aime la vie", performed by Sandra Kim. Following the introduction of semi-finals for the 2004 contest, Belgium had been featured in only four finals. In 2015, "Rhythm Inside" by Loïc Nottet qualified to the final and placed fourth—Belgium's best result in the contest since placing second in 2003.

The Belgian participation in the contest alternates between two broadcasters: Flemish Vlaamse Radio- en Televisieomroeporganisatie (VRT) and Walloon Radio-télévision belge de la Communauté française (RTBF) at the time, with both broadcasters sharing the broadcasting rights. Both broadcasters –and their predecessors– had selected the Belgian entry using national finals and internal selections in the past. In 2014, VRT organised the national final Eurosong in order to select its entry, while in 2015, RTBF internally selected a contestant from the reality singing competition The Voice Belgique to represent the nation. On 26 May 2015, VRT confirmed its participation in the 2016 contest and announced that the Eurosong national final would be held to select its entry.

== Before Eurovision ==
=== Eurosong 2016 ===
Eurosong 2016 was the national final that selected Belgium's entry in the Eurovision Song Contest 2016. The competition consisted of two live showcase shows that took place on 3 and 10 January 2016 followed by a final on 17 January 2016 where the winning song and artist were selected. All three shows took place at the AED studios in Lint, hosted by Peter Van de Veire and broadcast on Eén as well as online at the broadcaster's website een.be. The final was also broadcast online at the official Eurovision Song Contest website eurovision.tv.

==== Format ====
Five young musical talents were being sought to compete in Eurosong. The competition included two non-competitive showcase shows that took place on 3 and 10 January 2016. The 3 January show introduced the five artists and allowed them to showcase their singing skills, stage presence and personality by performing a cover version of a past Eurovision Song Contest song. The programme also showed how each artist progressed through their preparations and coaching. On the 10 January show, each artist presented their candidate Eurovision song. A public televote was also held during both shows to poll the audience's opinion on the artists and songs following their performances. The final took place on 17 January 2016 where the winner was chosen by ten international jury groups of five members each and public televoting. During each of the three shows, two experts of varying members also provided commentary and feedback to the artists.

==== Competing entries ====
An application period for artists was opened on 26 May 2015, and the names of the five acts selected for the competition were announced on 16 November 2015 during the radio MNM programme De Grote Peter Van de Veire Ochtendshow. The artists were selected by an A&R Team (Arts and Repertoire) consisting of music experts from VRT: Gerrit Kerremans (general music coordinator), Els Germonpré (Eén music manager) and Hans Snijders (radio MNM music manager), which were accompanied by artist manager Christopher Cocquyt. The five artists were coached and groomed by a team of experts in preparation for the national final. This team consisted of musical guidance from Christopher Cocquyt, vocal coaching from Lady Linn, media training from Geena Lisa and act staging/choreography from Ish Ait Hamou. Between 16 and 20 November 2015, the five artists were each presented and interviewed on De Grote Peter Van de Veire Ochtendshow and on the Eén television programme Iedereen beroemd. The five candidate Eurovision songs to be performed by the artists were announced on 5 January 2016.

Artist	Song	Songwriter(s)
Adil Aarab	"In Our Nature"	Adil Aarab, Bas Kennis, Will Knox, Joes Brands
Amaryllis Uitterlinden	"Kick the Habit"	Amaryllis Uitterlinden
Astrid Destuyver	"Everybody Aches"	Niko Westelinck
Laura Tesoro	"What's the Pressure"	Sanne Putseys, Louis Favre, Birsen Uçar, Yannick Werther
Tom Frantzis	"I'm Not Lost"	Tom Frantzis, Yves Gaillard

==== Shows ====
===== Showcase shows =====
The two showcase shows took place on 3 and 10 January 2016. The competing artists were introduced during the first show where they each performed a cover version of a past Eurovision Song Contest song, while the competing songs were introduced during the second show where each artist performed their candidate song for the 2016 Eurovision Song Contest. The two experts that provided feedback to the artists during each of the two shows were Stijn Kolacny (conductor of the women's choir Scala; first show), Alexander Rybak (singer-songwriter, winner of the Eurovision Song Contest 2009 for Norway; first show), Tom Helsen (singer-songwriter; second show) and Beverly Jo Scott (singer-songwriter, coach on The Voice Belgique, lyricist of Belgium's 2015 entry "Rhythm Inside"; second show). The televote held during the two shows were won by Amaryllis Uitterlinden and Laura Tesoro, respectively.

Show 1 – 3 January 2016
R/O	Artist	Song (Original artists)
1	Astrid Destuyver	"Everyway That I Can" (Sertab Erener)
2	Laura Tesoro	"Düm Tek Tek" (Hadise)
3	Adil Aarab	"Hold Me Now" (Johnny Logan)
4	Tom Frantzis	"Rhythm Inside" (Loïc Nottet)
5	Amaryllis Uitterlinden	"Euphoria" (Loreen)

Show 2 – 10 January 2016
R/O	Artist	Song
1	Amaryllis Uitterlinden	"Kick the Habit"
2	Adil Aarab	"In Our Nature"
3	Laura Tesoro	"What's the Pressure"
4	Astrid Destuyver	"Everybody Aches"
5	Tom Frantzis	"I'm Not Lost"

===== Final =====
The final took place on 17 January 2016. Each artist performed their candidate Eurovision song and the winner was selected over two rounds of voting. In the first round, the combination of results from ten international jury groups and a public televote determined the top two that proceeded to the superfinal. Each of the jury groups awarded points in the following manner: 6, 7, 8, 10 and 12, while the televote awarded points in the following manner: 60, 70, 80, 100 and 120. In the superfinal, the winner, "What's the Pressure" performed by Laura Tesoro, was selected solely by public televoting. The two experts that provided feedback to the artists during the final were Hadise (singer, participated in Idool 2003 and represented Turkey in the Eurovision Song Contest 2009) and Christer Björkman (singer, represented Sweden in the Eurovision Song Contest 1992, the Swedish Eurovision Head of Delegation). The final was split into two parts: in the first part, the songs were performed and the televote was opened; after the first part an episode of Den elfde van den elfde was aired while the results were being collected; and in the second part, the results were announced and the superfinal took place.

The following international jury groups were selected for the following reasons to provide their votes:

- Sweden – Most recent winner and host of the 2016 contest
- Hungary – Best forecaster of the winner, averaging the most points to the eventual winner since 2000
- Ireland – Has the most victories at the Eurovision Song Contest
- Netherlands – Has provided the highest number of points to Belgium in the history of the contest
- Azerbaijan – Has achieved great success in recent years at the contest with five top 5 placings in the last eight years; has never voted for Belgium
- United Kingdom – Has awarded their top score (12 points) to the winner of the contest eight times since 2000
- Latvia – Has awarded their top score (12 points) to the winner of the contest eight times since 2000
- Montenegro – Has never voted for Belgium
- France – Has provided the highest number of top scores (12 points) to Belgium in the history of the contest
- Greece – Has always qualified to the final since the introduction of semi-finals to the contest in 2004

Final – 17 January 2016
R/O	Artist	Song	Jury	Televote	Total	Place
1	Adil Aarab	"In Our Nature"	79	80	159	3
2	Laura Tesoro	"What's the Pressure"	107	120	227	1
3	Tom Frantzis	"I'm Not Lost"	100	100	200	2
4	Astrid Destuyver	"Everybody Aches"	65	60	125	5
5	Amaryllis Uitterlinden	"Kick the Habit"	79	70	149	4

Detailed International Jury Votes
R/O	Song	Sweden	Azerbaijan	Greece	Latvia	France	Netherlands	United Kingdom	Montenegro	Ireland	Hungary	Total
R/O	Song	Sweden	Azerbaijan	Greece	Latvia	France	Netherlands	United Kingdom	Montenegro	Ireland	Hungary	Total
1	"In Our Nature"	8	10	7	8	7	10	8	7	7	7	79
2	"What's the Pressure"	10	8	10	12	12	12	7	12	12	12	107
3	"I'm Not Lost"	12	12	12	10	10	8	12	8	8	8	100
4	"Everybody Aches"	6	6	8	7	8	6	6	6	6	6	65
5	"Kick the Habit"	7	7	6	6	6	7	10	10	10	10	79

Superfinal – 17 January 2016
R/O	Artist	Song	Place
1	Laura Tesoro	"What's the Pressure"	1
2	Tom Frantzis	"I'm Not Lost"	2

==== Ratings ====
Viewing figures by show
Show	Date	Viewing figures		Ref.
Show	Date	Nominal	Share	Ref.
Showcase show 1	3 January 2016	984,772	38.1%	
Showcase show 2	10 January 2016	964,112	35.8%	
Final	17 January 2016	978,112	36.5%	

=== Preparation ===
In late February 2016, Laura Tesoro traveled to London to work with producer Peter Gordeno and make minor adjustments for the final Eurovision version of "What's the Pressure". In early March, Tesoro filmed the music video for the song at the Studio Manhattan in Leuven. The video was released to the public on 12 March.

=== Promotion ===
Laura Tesoro's pre-contest promotion for "What's the Pressure" was focused in Belgium with television, radio and concert appearances. Tesoro announced that she would complete a summer concert tour with over thirty performance dates scheduled throughout Belgium; several concert dates were slated to occur prior to the Eurovision Song Contest. Tesoro performed at her first concert date on 13 March 2016 in Zottegem and later officially launched her tour on 12 April during a show at Club 27 in Edegem.

== At Eurovision ==
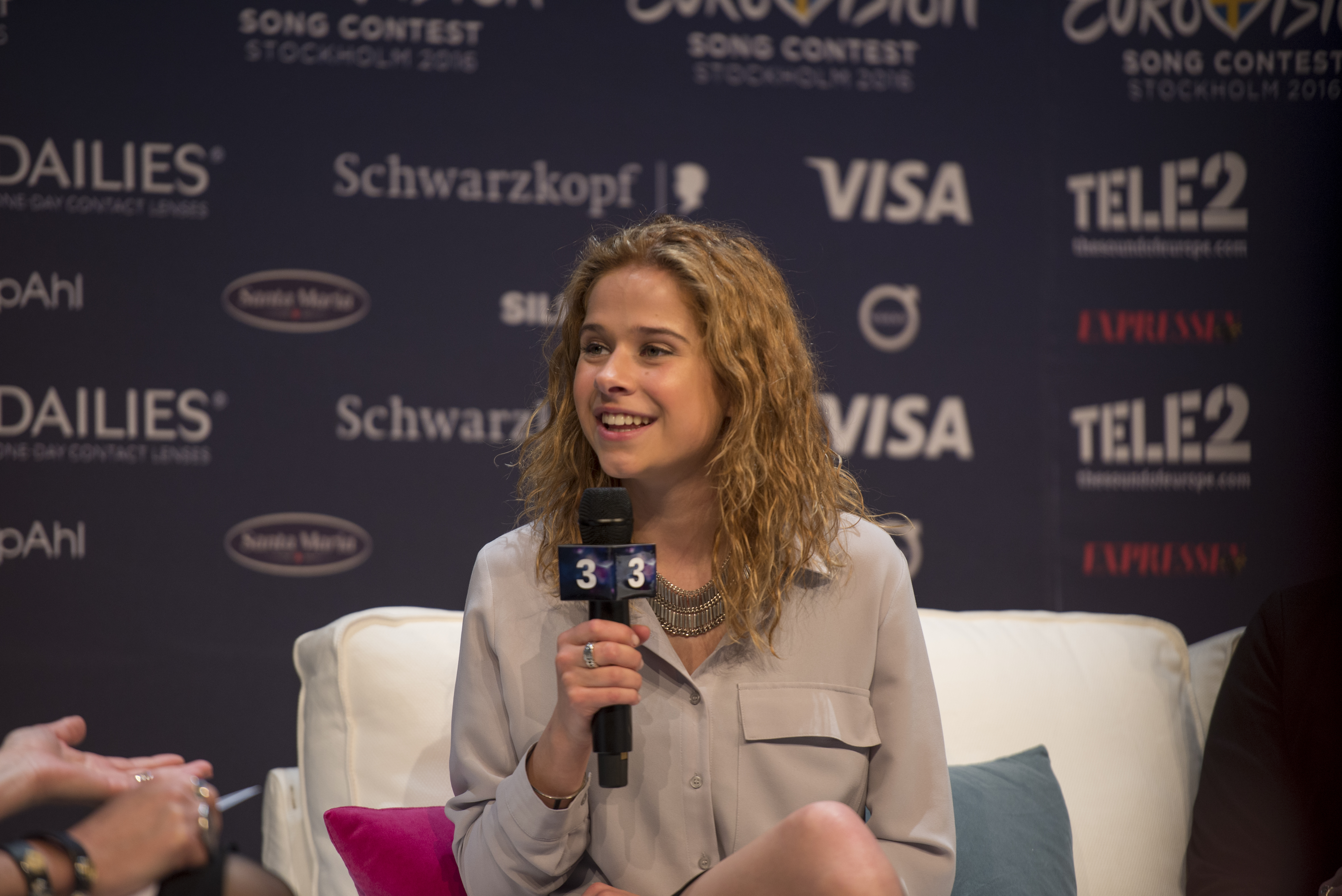
Laura Tesoro during a press meet and greet

According to Eurovision rules, all nations with the exceptions of the host country and the "Big Five" (France, Germany, Italy, Spain and the United Kingdom) are required to qualify from one of two semi-finals in order to compete for the final; the top ten countries from each semi-final progress to the final. The European Broadcasting Union (EBU) split up the competing countries into six different pots based on voting patterns from previous contests, with countries with favourable voting histories put into the same pot. On 25 January 2016, a special allocation draw was held which placed each country into one of the two semi-finals, as well as which half of the show they would perform in. Belgium was placed into the second semi-final, to be held on 12 May 2016, and was scheduled to perform in the second half of the show.

Once all the competing songs for the 2016 contest had been released, the running order for the semi-finals was decided by the shows' producers rather than through another draw, so that similar songs were not placed next to each other. Belgium was set to perform last in position 19, following the entry from Albania. However, following Romania's disqualification from the contest on 22 April and subsequent removal from the running order of the second semi-final, Belgium's performing position shifted to 18.

The two semi-finals and the final was broadcast in Belgium by both the Flemish and Walloon broadcasters. VRT broadcast the shows on één with commentary in Dutch by Peter Van de Veire. RTBF televised the shows on La Une with commentary in French by Jean-Louis Lahaye and Maureen Louys; the first semi-final aired on a one-hour delay on La Une. The Belgian spokesperson, who announced the top 12-point score awarded by the Belgian jury during the final, was Umesh Vangaver.

=== Semi-final ===
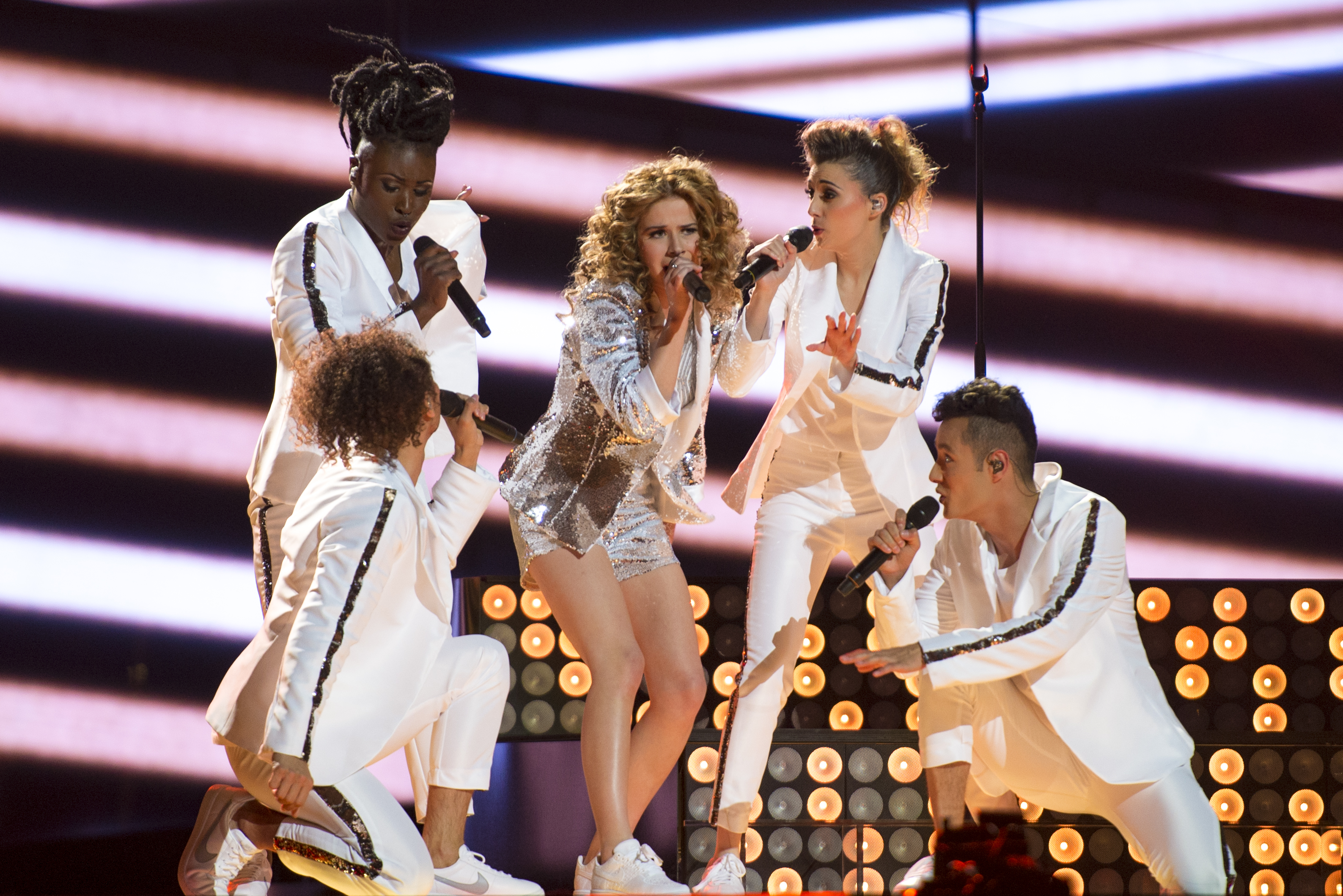
Laura Tesoro during a rehearsal before the second semi-final

Laura Tesoro took part in technical rehearsals on 5 and 7 May, followed by dress rehearsals on 11 and 12 May. This included the jury show on 11 May where the professional juries of each country watched and voted on the competing entries.

The Belgian performance featured Laura Tesoro dressed in a silver outfit and performing a choreographed dance routine on stage together with two female and two male backing vocalists/dancers who were dressed in white. The backing vocalists/dancers were positioned on stage with microphone stands atop raised platforms equipped with lighting. The performance began with the performers entering the stage waving and throwing handkerchiefs in the colours of the Belgian flag. The stage colours were yellow and red and the LED screens and stage floor displayed circular patterns and disco lights. Tesoro and her supporting performers concluded the performance on the satellite stage. The Belgian performance was choreographed by Ish Aït Hamou and Yves Ruth together with Laura Tesoro. The stage costumes for the performance were designed by the Antwerp-based ready-to-wear label O'Rèn. The backing vocalists/dancers and the one off-stage backing vocalist that joined Laura Tesoro during the performance were: Melany Bhola, Laurens Hagens, Kevin Van der Meer, Rebecca Louis and Tanja Daese.

At the end of the show, Belgium was announced as having finished in the top 10 and subsequently qualifying for the grand final. It was later revealed that Belgium placed third in the semi-final, receiving a total of 274 points: 135 points from the televoting and 139 points from the juries.

=== Final ===
Shortly after the second semi-final, a winners' press conference was held for the ten qualifying countries. As part of this press conference, the qualifying artists took part in a draw to determine which half of the grand final they would subsequently participate in. This draw was done in the reverse order the countries appeared in the semi-final running order. Belgium was drawn to compete in the first half. Following this draw, the shows' producers decided upon the running order of the final, as they had done for the semi-finals. Belgium was subsequently placed to perform in position 1, before the entry from the Czech Republic.

Laura Tesoro once again took part in dress rehearsals on 13 and 14 May before the final, including the jury final where the professional juries cast their final votes before the live show. Laura Tesoro performed a repeat of her semi-final performance during the final on 14 May. Belgium placed tenth in the final, scoring 181 points: 51 points from the televoting and 130 points from the juries.

=== Voting ===
Voting during the three shows was conducted under a new system that involved each country now awarding two sets of points from 1-8, 10 and 12: one from their professional jury and the other from televoting. Each nation's jury consisted of five music industry professionals who are citizens of the country they represent, with their names published before the contest to ensure transparency. This jury judged each entry based on: vocal capacity; the stage performance; the song's composition and originality; and the overall impression by the act. In addition, no member of a national jury was permitted to be related in any way to any of the competing acts in such a way that they cannot vote impartially and independently. The individual rankings of each jury member as well as the nation's televoting results were released shortly after the grand final.

Below is a breakdown of points awarded to Belgium and awarded by Belgium in the second semi-final and grand final of the contest, and the breakdown of the jury voting and televoting conducted during the two shows:

==== Points awarded to Belgium ====
Points awarded to Belgium (Semi-final 2)
Score	Televote	Jury
12 points	Australia; Denmark	Australia; Belarus; Ireland; Slovenia
10 points	Bulgaria; Serbia	Bulgaria; Georgia; Ukraine
8 points	Albania; Israel; Switzerland	Denmark; Germany
7 points	Norway; Slovenia	Norway; Switzerland; United Kingdom
6 points	Germany; Ireland; Latvia; Poland	Israel
5 points	Italy; Macedonia	Lithuania
4 points	Belarus; Lithuania; Ukraine; United Kingdom	Italy; Latvia
3 points	Georgia	Macedonia
2 points		Poland
1 point		

Points awarded to Belgium (Final)
Score	Televote	Jury
12 points	Australia; Netherlands	Australia; Ireland
10 points		Bulgaria; Georgia; Switzerland; Ukraine
8 points	Denmark	Denmark; Slovenia
7 points		
6 points		Israel
5 points	Serbia	Austria; Germany; Lithuania; Norway
4 points	France; Macedonia	Armenia; Belarus; Macedonia; Netherlands
3 points	Iceland	Iceland; Montenegro
2 points	Norway	Czech Republic
1 point	Israel	

==== Points awarded by Belgium ====
Points awarded by Belgium (Semi-final 2)
Score	Televote	Jury
12 points	Poland	Australia
10 points	Australia	Israel
8 points	Lithuania	Georgia
7 points	Bulgaria	Slovenia
6 points	Ukraine	Bulgaria
5 points	Denmark	Ukraine
4 points	Ireland	Norway
3 points	Latvia	Lithuania
2 points	Albania	Serbia
1 point	Israel	Switzerland

Points awarded by Belgium (Final)
Score	Televote	Jury
12 points	Poland	Australia
10 points	Netherlands	Italy
8 points	France	France
7 points	Armenia	Georgia
6 points	Russia	Bulgaria
5 points	Bulgaria	Austria
4 points	Australia	Netherlands
3 points	Austria	Ukraine
2 points	Ukraine	Israel
1 point	Sweden	Czech Republic

==== Detailed voting results ====
The following members comprised the Belgian jury:

- Tom Helsen (jury chairperson) – singer, songwriter
- Leen Demaré – radio DJ
- Axel Hirsoux – artist, represented Belgium in the 2014 contest
- Jo Lemaire – singer
- Aurélie Van Rompay – singer

Detailed voting results from Belgium (Semi-final 2)
R/O	Country	Jury							Televote	
R/O	Country	T. Helsen	L. Demaré	A. Hirsoux	J. Lemaire	A. Van Rompay	Rank	Points	Rank	Points
01	Latvia	12	12	15	5	14	15		8	3
02	Poland	9	11	11	7	13	13		1	12
03	Switzerland	10	5	13	12	8	10	1	17	
04	Israel	3	3	4	1	4	2	10	10	1
05	Belarus	13	7	6	13	12	12		13	
06	Serbia	14	14	7	8	5	9	2	15	
07	Ireland	11	9	14	14	7	14		7	4
08	Macedonia	15	15	17	15	17	16		16	
09	Lithuania	4	4	9	16	9	8	3	3	8
10	Australia	1	2	1	2	1	1	12	2	10
11	Slovenia	7	6	12	6	6	4	7	14	
12	Bulgaria	2	13	5	9	10	5	6	4	7
13	Denmark	5	10	10	10	16	11		6	5
14	Ukraine	17	17	2	3	2	6	5	5	6
15	Norway	8	8	3	11	11	7	4	12	
16	Georgia	6	1	8	4	3	3	8	11	
17	Albania	16	16	16	17	15	17		9	2
18	Belgium									

Detailed voting results from Belgium (Final)
R/O	Country	Jury							Televote	
R/O	Country	T. Helsen	L. Demaré	A. Hirsoux	J. Lemaire	A. Van Rompay	Rank	Points	Rank	Points
01	Belgium									
02	Czech Republic	13	14	8	8	9	10	1	23	
03	Netherlands	3	4	13	7	10	7	4	2	10
04	Azerbaijan	24	18	24	19	20	24		22	
05	Hungary	22	25	21	14	11	20		19	
06	Italy	2	6	5	1	3	2	10	13	
07	Israel	6	8	15	15	7	9	2	17	
08	Bulgaria	5	7	10	6	8	5	6	6	5
09	Sweden	25	16	19	20	24	23		10	1
10	Germany	16	17	9	21	12	14		21	
11	France	4	1	1	12	16	3	8	3	8
12	Poland	18	13	25	16	19	19		1	12
13	Australia	1	2	2	3	1	1	12	7	4
14	Cyprus	17	20	11	22	14	18		14	
15	Serbia	14	12	20	23	13	16		24	
16	Lithuania	7	21	16	17	18	15		12	
17	Croatia	19	22	18	9	15	17		25	
18	Russia	15	5	7	10	17	11		5	6
19	Spain	8	11	6	24	6	12		11	
20	Latvia	21	19	22	11	25	22		16	
21	Ukraine	20	10	4	5	2	8	3	9	2
22	Malta	10	24	17	25	21	21		15	
23	Georgia	12	3	14	2	5	4	7	20	
24	Austria	11	15	3	4	4	6	5	8	3
25	United Kingdom	9	9	12	13	22	13		18	
26	Armenia	23	23	23	18	23	25		4	7
