= Bulgaria in the Eurovision Song Contest 2016 =

- Eurovision Song Contest 2016
- Participating broadcaster: Bulgarian National Television (BNT)
- Country: Bulgaria
- Selection process: Internal selection
- Announcement date: Artist: 19 February 2016; Song: 21 March 2016

Competing entry
- Song: "If Love Was a Crime"
- Artist: Poli Genova
- Songwriters: Borislav Milanov; Sebastian Arman; Joacim Bo Persson; Poli Genova

Placement
- Semi-final result: Qualified (5th, 220 points)
- Final result: 4th, 307 points

Participation chronology

Bulgaria was represented at the Eurovision Song Contest 2016 with the song "If Love Was a Crime", written by Borislav Milanov, Sebastian Arman, Joacim Bo Persson and Poli Genova, and performed by Poli Genova herself. The Bulgarian participating broadcaster, Bulgarian National Television (BNT), announced in November 2015 that it would be returning to the contest after a two-year absence following its withdrawal in 2014 due to financial limitations. On 19 February 2016, it announced that it had selected Poli Genova to compete at the 2016 contest. The song that Genova competed with, "If Love Was a Crime", was also internally selected and was presented to the public on 21 March 2016. Poli Genova had represented Bulgaria in 2011 where she failed to qualify to the final with the song "Na inat".

Bulgaria was drawn to compete in the second semi-final of the Eurovision Song Contest which took place on 12 May 2016. Performing during the show in position 12, "If Love Was a Crime" was announced among the top 10 entries of the second semi-final and therefore qualified to compete in the final on 14 May. This marked the second time Bulgaria managed to qualify to the final, which they achieved after nine years since their last appearance in the final in 2007. It was later revealed that Bulgaria placed fifth out of the 18 participating countries in the semi-final with 220 points. In the final, Bulgaria performed in position 8 and placed fourth out of the 26 participating countries, scoring 307 points.

== Background ==
Prior to the 2016 contest, Bulgarian National Television (BNT) had participated in the Eurovision Song Contest representing Bulgaria nine times since its first entry in 2005. It achieved its best result in 2007 with the song "Water" performed by Elitsa Todorova and Stoyan Yankoulov, which placed fifth. To this point, their 2007 entry is also the only Bulgarian entry to have qualified to the Eurovision final; the nation had failed to qualify to the final with their other eight entries. In 2013, "Samo shampioni" by Elitsa and Stoyan failed to qualify, making it the sixth consecutive qualification failure for the country.

As part of its duties as participating broadcaster, BNT organises the selection of its entry in the Eurovision Song Contest and broadcasts the event in the country. In the past, BNT had alternated between both internal selections and national finals in order to select its entry. After consistently being present for every contest since its debut in 2005, BNT announced in November 2013 that it would not participate in the 2014 citing an expensive participation fee and limited funds due to budget cuts as reasons for its decision. Limited finances also prevented the broadcaster from returning in 2015. Following its two-year absence, BNT confirmed its participation in the 2016 contest on 26 November 2015.

== Before Eurovision ==
=== Internal selection ===
On 19 February 2016, BNT announced that the broadcaster's managing board had internally selected Poli Genova to represent Bulgaria in Stockholm. Earlier on 24 January 2016, the broadcaster had announced via their official Twitter account that they had internally selected a female performer for the competition. Poli Genova previously represented Bulgaria in the Eurovision Song Contest 2011 where she failed to qualify to the final with the song "Na inat". In November 2015, Genova hosted the Junior Eurovision Song Contest 2015 which was held in Sofia.

Poli Genova's song "If Love Was a Crime" was internally selected and presented on 21 March 2016 through the release of the official music video via the official Eurovision Song Contest website eurovision.tv. The song was written by members of the songwriting team Symphonics and Redfly: Borislav Milanov, Sebastian Arman, Joacim Bo Persson, as well as Poli Genova herself. The instrumental recording of the song also features Bulgarian flutist Theodosii Spassov. In regards to the song, Genova stated: "The song is powerful, engaging and casts the one and only universal message – love is above all other circumstances. Love is something we discover everywhere around us and it is a feeling that is an essential part of us. It brings us energy and faith. And we feel exactly the same way, because we know love is what makes us unstoppable. We want this message to reach everyone in this world".

=== Promotion ===
Poli Genova made several appearances across Europe to specifically promote "If Love Was a Crime" as the Bulgarian Eurovision entry. On 2 April, Genova performed during the Eurovision PreParty Riga, which was organised by OGAE Latvia and held at the Spikeri Concert Hall in Riga, Latvia. On 9 April, Poli Genova performed during the Eurovision in Concert event which was held at the Melkweg venue in Amsterdam, Netherlands and hosted by Cornald Maas and Hera Björk. Between 11 and 13 April, Genova took part in promotional activities in Tel Aviv, Israel where she performed during the Israel Calling event held at the Ha'teatron venue and recorded a performance of "If Love Was a Crime" for the Israeli web portal Walla!. On 17 April, Genova performed during the London Eurovision Party, which was held at the Café de Paris venue in London, United Kingdom and hosted by Nicki French and Paddy O'Connell.

== At Eurovision ==
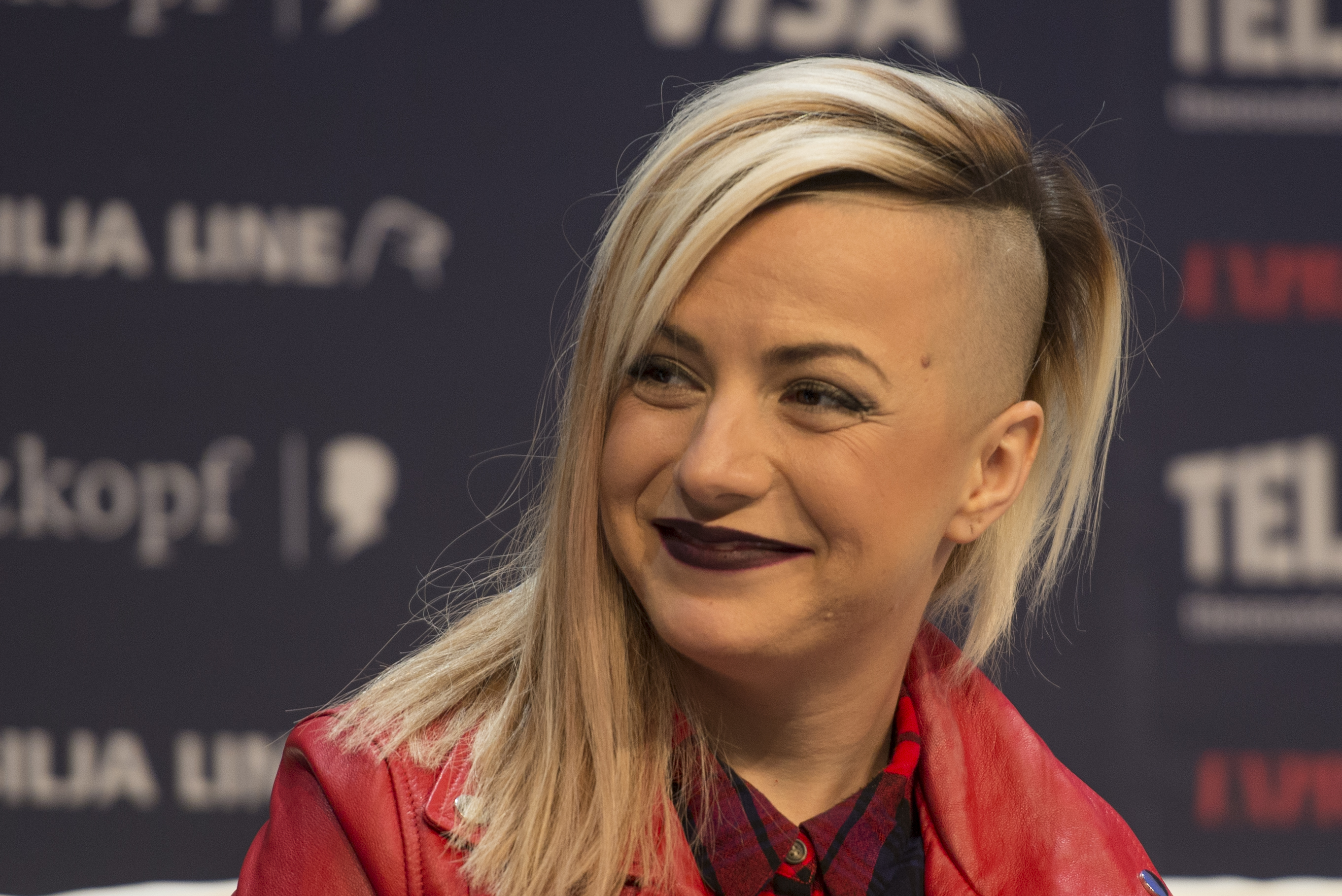
Poli Genova during a press meet and greet

According to Eurovision rules, all nations with the exceptions of the host country and the "Big Five" (France, Germany, Italy, Spain and the United Kingdom) are required to qualify from one of two semi-finals in order to compete for the final; the top ten countries from each semi-final progress to the final. The European Broadcasting Union (EBU) split up the competing countries into six different pots based on voting patterns from previous contests, with countries with favourable voting histories put into the same pot. On 25 January 2016, a special allocation draw was held which placed each country into one of the two semi-finals, as well as which half of the show they would perform in. Bulgaria was placed into the second semi-final, to be held on 12 May 2016, and was scheduled to perform in the second half of the show.

Once all the competing songs for the 2016 contest had been released, the running order for the semi-finals was decided by the shows' producers rather than through another draw, so that similar songs were not placed next to each other. Originally, Bulgaria was set to perform in position 13, following the entry from Romania and before the entry from Denmark. However, following Romania's disqualification from the contest on 22 April and subsequent removal from the running order of the second semi-final, Bulgaria's performing position shifted to 12 and the nation would now perform following the entry from Slovenia.

The two semi-finals and the final were broadcast in Bulgaria on BNT 1 and BNT HD with commentary by Elena Rosberg and Georgi Kushvaliev. The Bulgarian spokesperson, who announced the top 12-point score awarded by the Bulgarian jury during the final, was Anna Angelova.

=== Semi-final ===
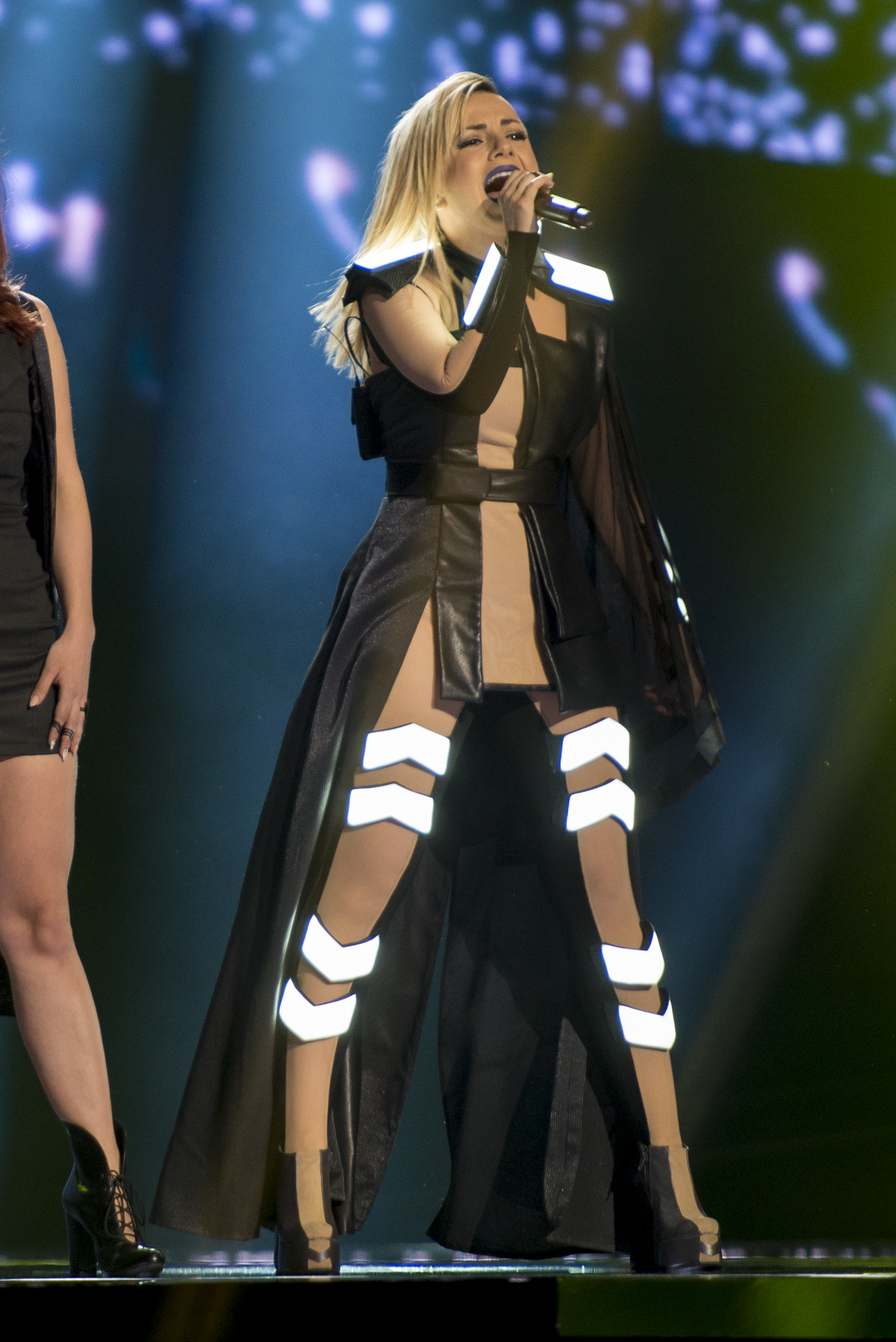
Poli Genova during a rehearsal before the second semi-final

Poli Genova took part in technical rehearsals on 5 and 7 May, followed by dress rehearsals on 11 and 12 May. This included the jury show on 11 May where the professional juries of each country watched and voted on the competing entries.

The Bulgarian performance featured Poli Genova performing a choreographed routine in a black, white and nude outfit with LED enhancements that light up during the final chorus of the song. The stage colours were black and white and the LED screens displayed black and white elements, television static and rows of dancers performing the same choreography as Genova. Five backing vocalists joined Poli Genova on stage at the end of the song: Borislav Borisov Dimitrov (Bobo), Cesár Ken Charleston (Cesár Sa) and the members of the group LaTiDa, Desislava Hristova, Elizabet Nesheva and Yana Baleva. Sampson would go on to represent Austria in the Eurovision Song Contest 2018. The stage concept for the Bulgarian performance was developed by Swedish choreographer Ambra Succi, who completed the choreography of performance together with Bulgarian choreographer Milen Dankov.

At the end of the show, Bulgaria was announced as having finished in the top 10 and subsequently qualifying for the grand final. This marked the second time Bulgaria managed to qualify to the final, which they achieved after nine years since their last appearance in the final in 2007. It was later revealed that Bulgaria placed fifth in the semi-final, receiving a total of 220 points: 122 points from the televoting and 98 points from the juries.

=== Final ===
Shortly after the second semi-final, a winners' press conference was held for the ten qualifying countries. As part of this press conference, the qualifying artists took part in a draw to determine which half of the grand final they would subsequently participate in. This draw was done in the reverse order the countries appeared in the semi-final running order. Bulgaria was drawn to compete in the first half. Following this draw, the shows' producers decided upon the running order of the final, as they had done for the semi-finals. Bulgaria was subsequently placed to perform in position 8, following the entry from Israel and before the entry from Sweden.

Poli Genova once again took part in dress rehearsals on 13 and 14 May before the final, including the jury final where the professional juries cast their final votes before the live show. Poli Genova performed a repeat of her semi-final performance during the final on 14 May. Bulgaria placed fourth in the final, scoring 307 points: 180 points from the televoting and 127 points from the juries.

=== Voting ===
Voting during the three shows was conducted under a new system that involved each country now awarding two sets of points from 1–8, 10 and 12: one from their professional jury and the other from televoting. Each nation's jury consisted of five music industry professionals who are citizens of the country they represent, with their names published before the contest to ensure transparency. This jury judged each entry based on: vocal capacity; the stage performance; the song's composition and originality; and the overall impression by the act. In addition, no member of a national jury was permitted to be related in any way to any of the competing acts in such a way that they cannot vote impartially and independently. The individual rankings of each jury member as well as the nation's televoting results were released shortly after the grand final.

Below is a breakdown of points awarded to Bulgaria and awarded by Bulgaria in the second semi-final and grand final of the contest, and the breakdown of the jury voting and televoting conducted during the two shows:

==== Points awarded to Bulgaria ====
Points awarded to Bulgaria (Semi-final 2)
Score	Televote	Jury
12 points		
10 points	Australia; Israel	Ireland; Norway
8 points	Belarus; Macedonia; Serbia; United Kingdom	Australia; Macedonia
7 points	Albania; Belgium; Germany; Italy	Albania; Denmark; Latvia
6 points	Norway	Belgium; Slovenia
5 points	Georgia; Ireland; Slovenia; Ukraine	Poland; United Kingdom
4 points	Poland	Belarus; Germany; Switzerland
3 points	Denmark; Latvia; Lithuania; Switzerland	Israel
2 points		Lithuania; Serbia
1 point		

Points awarded to Bulgaria (Final)
Score	Televote	Jury
12 points	Cyprus; Spain	
10 points	Australia; Macedonia	France; Ireland; Macedonia; Malta; Slovenia
8 points	Albania; Azerbaijan; Malta; Serbia; United Kingdom	Australia; Azerbaijan; Norway
7 points	Greece; Israel; Italy	Armenia; Israel
6 points		Belgium; Denmark
5 points	Austria; Belgium; Czech Republic; France; Ireland; Montenegro; Norway	United Kingdom
4 points	Belarus; Finland; Germany; Hungary; Sweden	Albania; Serbia
3 points	Georgia; Poland; San Marino	Bosnia and Herzegovina; Poland
2 points	Bosnia and Herzegovina; Moldova; Slovenia; Ukraine	Lithuania; Montenegro
1 point	Croatia; Latvia; Netherlands	Belarus; Latvia; Switzerland; Ukraine

==== Points awarded by Bulgaria ====
Points awarded by Bulgaria (Semi-final 2)
Score	Televote	Jury
12 points	Ukraine	Australia
10 points	Belgium	Belgium
8 points	Macedonia	Serbia
7 points	Australia	Georgia
6 points	Poland	Belarus
5 points	Serbia	Israel
4 points	Belarus	Ukraine
3 points	Lithuania	Lithuania
2 points	Israel	Albania
1 point	Norway	Slovenia

Points awarded by Bulgaria (Final)
Score	Televote	Jury
12 points	Russia	Armenia
10 points	Ukraine	Belgium
8 points	Armenia	Australia
7 points	Cyprus	Malta
6 points	Poland	Russia
5 points	Australia	Serbia
4 points	Austria	Spain
3 points	Sweden	Georgia
2 points	Israel	Netherlands
1 point	Azerbaijan	Lithuania

==== Detailed voting results ====
The following members comprised the Bulgarian jury:

- Michail Belchev (jury chairperson) – poet, singer, songwriter
- Joanna Dragneva – pop singer, artist, represented Bulgaria in 2008 as member of Deep Zone Project
- Tedy Katzarova – singer, songwriter
- Stoyan Yankoulov – artist, drummer and percussionist, represented Bulgaria in 2007 and 2013 with Elitsa Todorova
- Angel Zaberski-son – conductor, composer, musician

Detailed voting results from Bulgaria (Semi-final 2)
R/O	Country	Jury							Televote	
R/O	Country	M. Belchev	J. Dragneva	T. Katzarova	S. Yankoulov	A. Zaberski	Rank	Points	Rank	Points
01	Latvia	15	7	16	8	12	14		12	
02	Poland	12	10	12	7	16	12		5	6
03	Switzerland	16	17	15	14	14	16		17	
04	Israel	7	9	4	6	7	6	5	9	2
05	Belarus	3	4	9	5	11	5	6	7	4
06	Serbia	2	3	3	10	3	3	8	6	5
07	Ireland	13	12	10	12	10	13		14	
08	Macedonia	10	15	17	9	6	11		3	8
09	Lithuania	8	2	5	15	13	8	3	8	3
10	Australia	1	1	2	2	2	1	12	4	7
11	Slovenia	11	14	13	11	5	10	1	15	
12	Bulgaria									
13	Denmark	14	16	14	17	17	17		11	
14	Ukraine	9	6	7	4	15	7	4	1	12
15	Norway	17	13	11	13	8	15		10	1
16	Georgia	6	8	6	3	9	4	7	13	
17	Albania	5	11	8	16	4	9	2	16	
18	Belgium	4	5	1	1	1	2	10	2	10

Detailed voting results from Bulgaria (Final)
R/O	Country	Jury							Televote	
R/O	Country	M. Belchev	J. Dragneva	T. Katzarova	S. Yankoulov	A. Zaberski	Rank	Points	Rank	Points
01	Belgium	4	4	1	3	2	2	10	13	
02	Czech Republic	16	22	16	15	12	16		24	
03	Netherlands	17	11	18	5	8	9	2	23	
04	Azerbaijan	18	12	21	22	13	18		10	1
05	Hungary	23	9	15	24	25	21		16	
06	Italy	22	24	22	18	17	24		18	
07	Israel	20	8	8	13	15	12		9	2
08	Bulgaria									
09	Sweden	10	17	19	25	22	20		8	3
10	Germany	24	14	23	21	21	25		22	
11	France	15	21	20	20	20	22		12	
12	Poland	11	23	12	7	10	11		5	6
13	Australia	5	3	2	4	1	3	8	6	5
14	Cyprus	21	19	24	19	19	23		4	7
15	Serbia	2	7	4	11	7	6	5	11	
16	Lithuania	12	6	9	17	18	10	1	15	
17	Croatia	19	18	17	16	6	15		25	
18	Russia	1	10	5	10	4	5	6	1	12
19	Spain	7	16	10	6	11	7	4	17	
20	Latvia	8	13	11	9	23	14		14	
21	Ukraine	25	5	7	23	24	17		2	10
22	Malta	9	2	13	1	5	4	7	19	
23	Georgia	6	20	6	8	16	8	3	20	
24	Austria	13	25	25	14	14	19		7	4
25	United Kingdom	14	15	14	12	9	13		21	
26	Armenia	3	1	3	2	3	1	12	3	8
