= Australia in the Eurovision Song Contest 2016 =

- Eurovision Song Contest 2016
- Participating broadcaster: Special Broadcasting Service (SBS)
- Country: Australia
- Selection process: Internal selection
- Announcement date: Artist: 3 March 2016; Song: 11 March 2016

Competing entry
- Song: "Sound of Silence"
- Artist: Dami Im
- Songwriters: Anthony Egizii; David Musumeci

Placement
- Semi-final result: Qualified (1st, 330 points)
- Final result: 2nd, 511 points

Participation chronology

Australia was represented at the Eurovision Song Contest 2016 with the song "Sound of Silence", written by Anthony Egizii and David Musumeci, and performed by Dami Im. The Australian participating broadcaster, the Special Broadcasting Service (SBS), internally selected its entry for the contest. Im was announced as the Australian representative on 3 March 2016 during the Sydney concert of Conchita Wurst, who won Eurovision for Austria in 2014. The song Im performed, "Sound of Silence", was presented to the public on 11 March 2016.

Australia debuted in the Eurovision Song Contest in 2015 by an invitation to SBS from the European Broadcasting Union (EBU) as a "one-off" special guest to celebrate the 60th anniversary of the contest. On 17 November 2015, the EBU announced that SBS had been invited to participate again in the 2016 contest. In 2015, Australia was guaranteed a spot in the final of the contest and was allowed to vote during both semi-finals and the final; however, for the 2016 contest, Australia would have to qualify to the final from one of two semi-finals and could only vote in the semi-final in which the nation was allocated to compete.

Australia was drawn to compete in the second semi-final of the Eurovision Song Contest which took place on 12 May 2016. Performing during the show in position 10, "Sound of Silence" was announced among the top 10 entries of the second semi-final and therefore qualified to compete in the final on 14 May. It was later revealed that Australia placed first out of the 18 participating countries in the semi-final with 330 points. In the final, Australia performed in position 13 and placed second out of the 26 participating countries, scoring 511 points.

== Background ==
Special Broadcasting Service (SBS) has broadcast the Eurovision Song Contest since 1983, and the contest has gained a cult following over that time, primarily due to the country's strong political and cultural ties with Europe. Paying tribute to this, the 2014 contest semi-finals included an interval act featuring Australian singer Jessica Mauboy. Australian singers have also participated at Eurovision as representatives of other countries, including Olivia Newton-John (United Kingdom 1974), two-time winner Johnny Logan (Ireland 1980 and Ireland 1987), Gina G (United Kingdom 1996), and Jane Comerford as lead singer of Texas Lightning (Germany 2006).

Tying in with the goal of Eurovision—to showcase "the importance of bringing countries together to celebrate diversity, music and culture", the 2015 theme of "Building Bridges", and arguing that they could not hold "the world's biggest party" to celebrate the 60th edition of Eurovision without inviting the SBS, the European Broadcasting Union (EBU) announced on 10 February 2015 that Australia would compete at that year's edition as a special guest participant. Along with the "Big Five" (France, Germany, Italy, Spain, and the United Kingdom), and the host country Austria, Australia was given automatic entry into the final to "not reduce the chances" of the semi-final participants. Their entry, "Tonight Again" performed by Guy Sebastian, came in fifth place with 196 points, and was awarded the maximum 'douze points' by Austria and Sweden.

== Before Eurovision ==
=== Invitation to participate ===
On 17 November 2015, the EBU announced that their Australian Associate Member broadcaster SBS had accepted the invitation to return and compete representing Australia in the Eurovision Song Contest 2016. The contest Reference Group voted unanimously in favour of their participation. In 2015, Australia was granted direct entry into the final of the contest as well as the right to vote in both semi-finals and the final; however, the conditions of Australia's return in 2016 required them to compete for qualification to the final in one of the two semi-finals and only vote in the semi-final that they were allocated to compete in. In addition, should Australia win the contest in 2016, the 2017 contest would be organised by SBS in collaboration with another EBU broadcaster and would take place somewhere in Europe.

In regards to Australia's participation in 2016, the contest's Executive Supervisor, Jon Ola Sand, stated: "The feedback we got from viewers, fans, press and the broadcasters after Australia's participation in Vienna was overwhelmingly positive. We strongly believe the Eurovision Song Contest has the potential to evolve organically into a truly global event. Australia's continued participation is an exciting step in that direction. It remains to be seen what such an event may look like in the long run." SBS CEO and managing director Michael Ebeid stated: "SBS is thrilled to have secured this opportunity for Australia to compete at Stockholm in 2016 and thank the European Broadcasting Union for their invitation. The Eurovision Song Contest is a wonderful example of cultural diversity and social inclusion and our continued participation offers a fantastic opportunity to showcase Australian musical talent in a truly international multicultural celebration. Production partner Blink TV have been integral in supporting our ambition to build Australia's presence on the world's biggest stage and together we look forward to again bringing the Eurovision experience to our screens."

=== Internal selection ===
Dami Im was announced as the artist that would represent Australia at the Eurovision Song Contest 2016 on 3 March 2016. The announcement was made by Conchita Wurst, who won Eurovision for Austria in 2014, during her concert with the Sydney Symphony Orchestra, Conchita: From Vienna with Love, which took place at the Sydney Opera House. SBS streamed the announcement online through Facebook Live. In regards to her selection as the Australian representative, Im stated: "I am so thrilled and honoured to be representing Australia at Eurovision this year in Stockholm. I am really excited to be following in the footsteps of Guy Sebastian and Jessica Mauboy who have both graced the Eurovision stage before me. I truly believe that the Australian public and Eurovision fans around the world are going to love the song I will be performing in Sweden. I cannot wait to showcase it to the world and represent Australia to the best of my ability!" Dami Im also represented Australia at the ABU TV Song Festival 2014 with the song "Living Dangerously".

Dami Im's Eurovision song, "Sound of Silence", was previewed on 10 March 2016 during the SBS 2 programme The Feed. The official video and digital download release of the full song occurred on 11 March 2016. The song was written by the songwriting and production team DNA Songs, which consists of Anthony Egizii and David Musumeci.

The first time I heard "Sound of Silence" I knew it was the perfect song for me to perform at the Eurovision Song Contest. There are many ways to interpret the meaning around a song, but one theme that I relate to in "Sound of Silence" is that of disconnection and being away from the people in my life that I love. We live in a world where it is easy to be connected every minute of the day but along with this connection you can feel alone and isolated. I can't wait to perform it live in Stockholm and connect with a whole new audience.

— Dami Im about "Sound of Silence"

==== Lyric controversy ====
Controversy arose following the release of the Australian entry due to complaints that the lyrics of "Sound of Silence" violated the rules of the Eurovision Song Contest, which prohibit lyrics that contain "messages promoting any political cause, company, brand, products or services". The lyric in question, "Trying to feel your love through face time", was alleged to be mentioning the Apple Inc. videotelephony product FaceTime. On 5 April 2016, the Eurovision Song Contest Reference Group released a statement that cleared the song for the competition: "The lyrics of the Australian song are presented as two separate words, 'face time' and not FaceTime which is an Apple trademark".

=== Promotion ===
Prior to the Eurovision Song Contest, Dami Im made several appearances across Australia to promote "Sound of Silence" as the Australian Eurovision entry while also promoting her album Classic Carpenters, which was released on 22 April 2016. On 10 April, Im performed "Sound of Silence" live for the first time during the Streat Vibes Music Festival at Watergardens Town Centre in Melbourne. On 12 April, Im performed the song during the Salesforce World Tour in Melbourne. On 23 April, Dami Im performed "Sound of Silence" at the Hyperdome Home Centre in Loganholme and at Warner Bros. Movie World in Gold Coast. On 28 April, Im performed the song at Westfield Parramatta in Sydney.

== At Eurovision ==
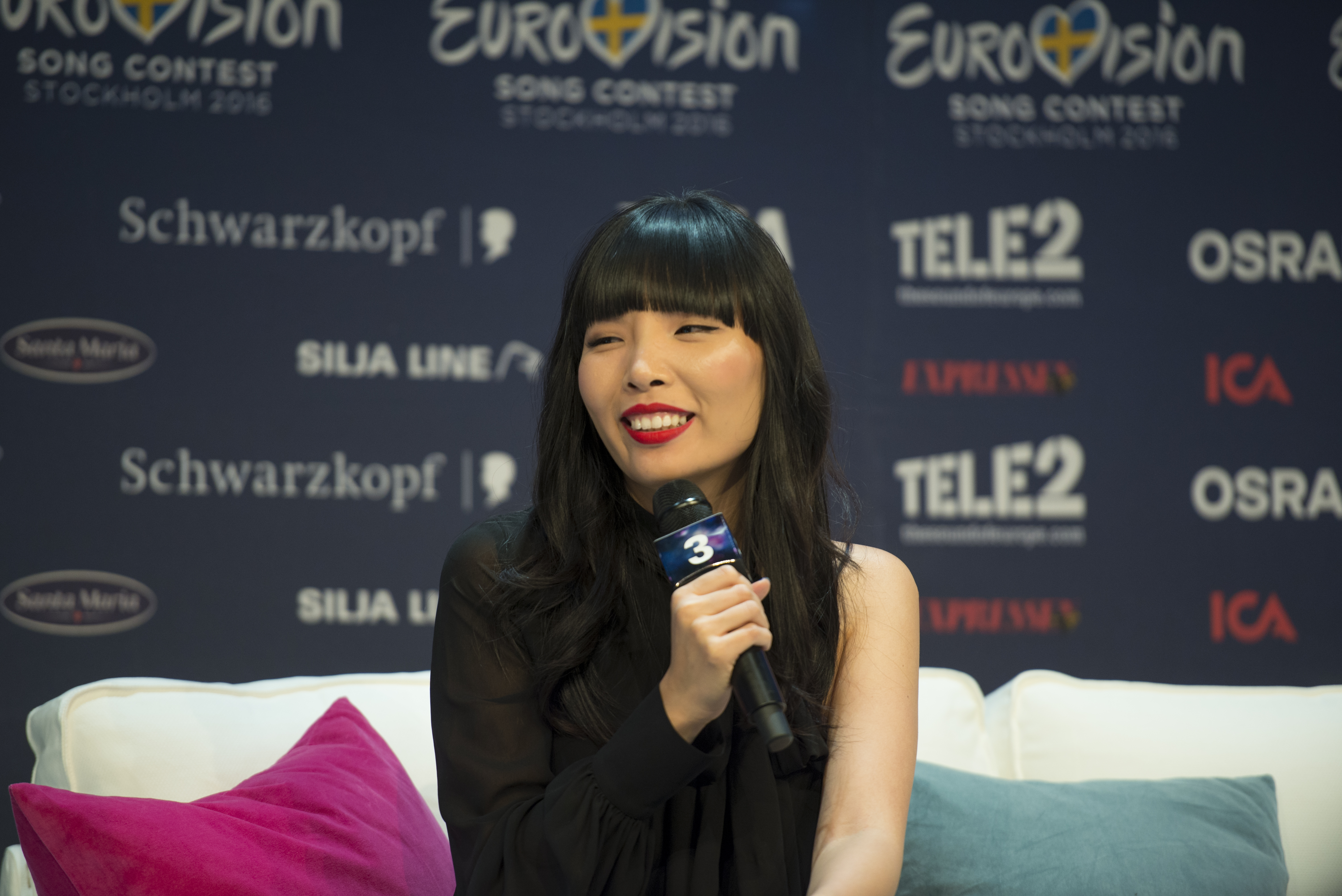
Dami Im during a press meet and greet

According to Eurovision rules, all nations with the exceptions of the host country and the "Big Five" (France, Germany, Italy, Spain, and the United Kingdom) are required to qualify from one of two semi-finals in order to compete for the final; the top ten countries from each semi-final progress to the final. The European Broadcasting Union (EBU) split up the competing countries into six different pots based on voting patterns from previous contests, with countries with favourable voting histories put into the same pot. On 25 January 2016, a special allocation draw was held which placed each country into one of the two semi-finals, as well as which half of the show they would perform in. Australia was placed into the second semi-final, to be held on 12 May 2016, and was scheduled to perform in the first half of the show.

Once all the competing songs for the 2016 contest had been released, the running order for the semi-finals was decided by the shows' producers rather than through another draw, so that similar songs were not placed next to each other. Australia was set to perform in position 10, following the entry from Lithuania and before the entry from Slovenia.

In Australia, both semi-finals and the final were broadcast live on SBS at 5 am AEST, allowing Australia to participate in the official voting period for the second semi-final and the final. In addition to live broadcasts early on Wednesday, Friday and Sunday mornings, all three shows were replayed in primetime on Friday, Saturday and Sunday nights as part of SBS's Eurovision Weekend. The commentators for all three shows were Julia Zemiro and Sam Pang. SBS Radio also launched SBS Eurovision Radio on 1 May, which was broadcast via SBS Radio 4 and the SBS Radio App; the radio broadcasts featured backstage coverage of the contest, interviews with the contestants by reporter Alistair Birch and live simulcasts of the contest as it aired on SBS. SBS appointed Lee Lin Chin as its spokesperson to announced the top 12-point score awarded by the Australian jury during the final.

=== Semi-final ===
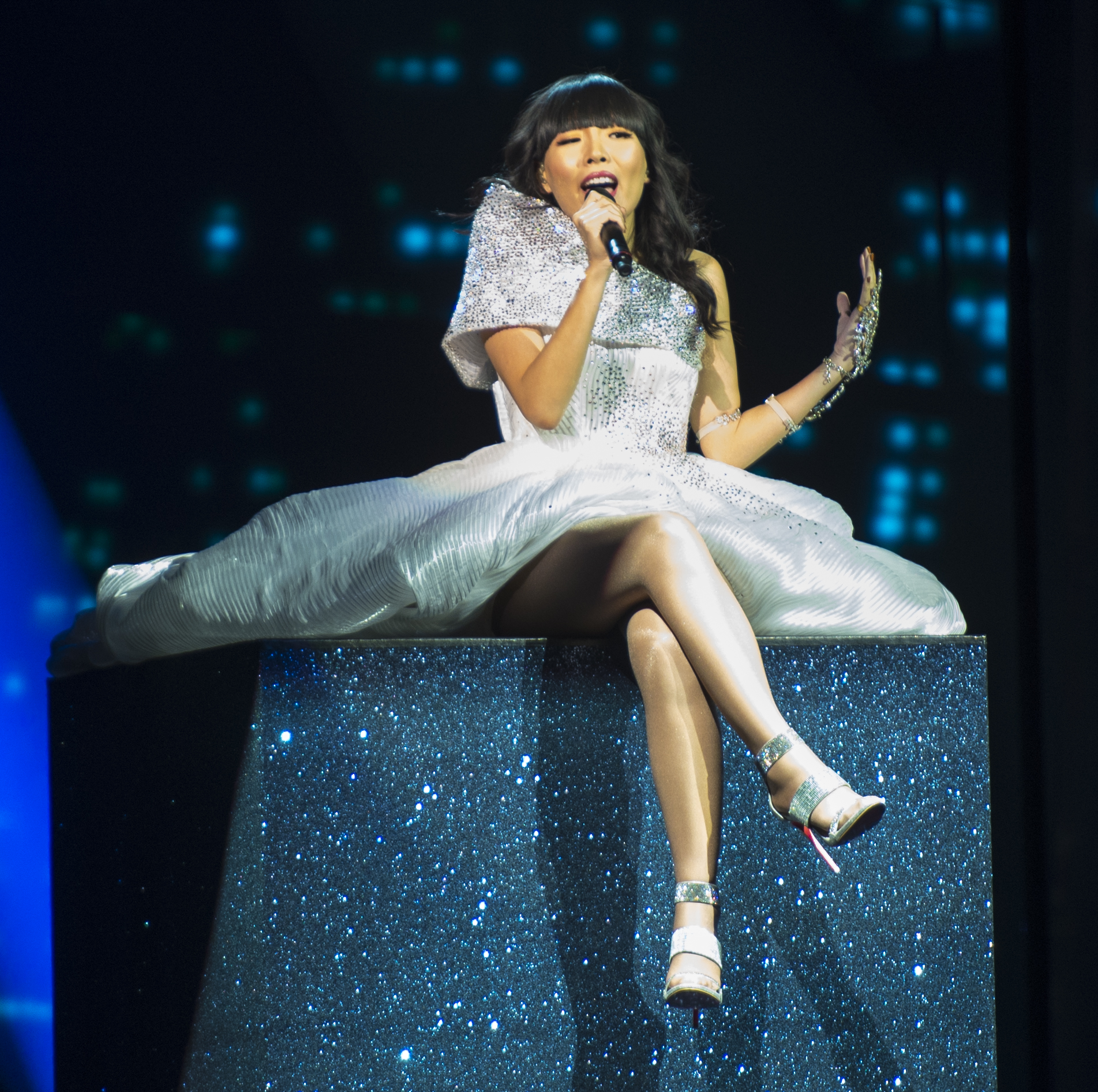
Dami Im during a rehearsal before the second semi-final

Dami Im took part in technical rehearsals on 4 and 7 May, followed by dress rehearsals on 11 and 12 May. This included the jury show on 11 May where the professional juries of each country watched and voted on the competing entries.

The Australian performance featured Dami Im performing in a white dress with crystals on the top half designed by Australian designer Steven Khalil. Dami Im began her performance on top of a large blue box surrounded by transparent hologram screens which displayed a nighttime city skyline, robotic imagery and pictures of faces. Im interacted with the screens by making hand motions that gave the impression that the images displayed were being manipulated. Dami Im finished the performance standing on the stage with a wind machine and the stage displaying blue light effects. Dami Im was joined by two off-stage backing vocalists: Anna Sahlene and Dea Norberg. Sahlene previously represented Estonia in 2002 where she placed third with the song "Runaway".

At the end of the show, Australia was announced as having finished in the top 10 and subsequently qualifying for the grand final. It was later revealed that Australia placed first in the semi-final, receiving a total of 330 points: 142 points from the televoting and 188 points from the juries.

=== Final ===
Shortly after the second semi-final, a winners' press conference was held for the ten qualifying countries. As part of this press conference, the qualifying artists took part in a draw to determine which half of the grand final they would subsequently participate in. This draw was done in the reverse order the countries appeared in the semi-final running order. Australia was drawn to compete in the first half. Following this draw, the shows' producers decided upon the running order of the final, as they had done for the semi-finals. Australia was subsequently placed to perform in position 13, following the entry from Poland and before the entry from Cyprus.

Dami Im once again took part in dress rehearsals on 13 and 14 May before the final, including the jury final where the professional juries cast their final votes before the live show. Dami Im performed a repeat of her semi-final performance during the final on 14 May. Australia placed second in the final, scoring 511 points: 191 points from the televoting and 320 points from the juries.

==== Marcel Bezençon Awards ====
The Marcel Bezençon Awards, first awarded during the 2002 contest, are awards honouring the best competing songs in the final each year. Named after the creator of the annual contest, Marcel Bezençon, the awards are divided into 3 categories: the Press Award, given to the best entry as voted on by the accredited media and press during the event; the Artistic Award, presented to the best artist as voted on by the shows' commentators; and the Composer Award, given to the best and most original composition as voted by the participating composers. "Sound of Silence" was awarded the Composer Award, which was accepted at the awards ceremony by the songwriters David Musumeci and Anthony Egizii.

=== Voting ===
Voting during the three shows was conducted under a new system that involved each country now awarding two sets of points from 1–8, 10 and 12: one from their professional jury and the other from televoting. Each nation's jury consisted of five music industry professionals who are citizens of the country they represent, with their names published before the contest to ensure transparency. This jury judged each entry based on: vocal capacity; the stage performance; the song's composition and originality; and the overall impression by the act. In addition, no member of a national jury was permitted to be related in any way to any of the competing acts in such a way that they cannot vote impartially and independently. The individual rankings of each jury member as well as the nation's televoting results were released shortly after the grand final.

Below is a breakdown of points awarded to Australia and awarded by Australia in the second semi-final and grand final of the contest, and the breakdown of the jury voting and televoting conducted during the two shows:

==== Points awarded to Australia ====
Points awarded to Australia (Semi-final 2)
Score	Televote	Jury
12 points	Israel	Belgium; Bulgaria; Denmark; Israel; Italy; Lithuania; Norway; Switzerland; Ukraine
10 points	Belgium; Germany; Poland	Albania; Poland; United Kingdom
8 points	Denmark; Ireland; Latvia; Norway	Belarus; Georgia; Latvia
7 points	Belarus; Bulgaria; Serbia; Ukraine	Germany
6 points	Albania; Slovenia; Switzerland; United Kingdom	Ireland
5 points	Lithuania	Slovenia
4 points	Georgia; Macedonia	Macedonia; Serbia
3 points	Italy	
2 points		
1 point		

Points awarded to Australia (Final)
Score	Televote	Jury
12 points	Albania; Malta; Sweden	Albania; Austria; Belgium; Croatia; Hungary; Lithuania; Netherlands; Sweden; Switzerland
10 points	Denmark	Bosnia and Herzegovina; Cyprus; Denmark; Estonia; Iceland; Israel; Moldova; Norway; Poland
8 points	Iceland; Norway	Bulgaria; Finland; Georgia; Macedonia; Spain; United Kingdom
7 points	Finland; Poland	Azerbaijan; Greece
6 points	Ireland; Latvia; Serbia; United Kingdom	Belarus; France; Germany; Italy; Serbia; Slovenia
5 points	Bulgaria; Croatia; Cyprus; Germany; Greece; Israel; Lithuania; Moldova; Netherlands; San Marino	Armenia; Latvia; Ukraine
4 points	Belgium; Estonia; Russia; Spain; Ukraine	Montenegro
3 points	Austria; Bosnia and Herzegovina; Hungary; Macedonia; Slovenia	Malta
2 points	Azerbaijan	Russia
1 points	Belarus; Czech Republic; Georgia; Switzerland	

==== Points awarded by Australia ====
Points awarded by Australia (Semi-final 2)
Score	Televote	Jury
12 points	Belgium	Belgium
10 points	Bulgaria	Israel
8 points	Lithuania	Bulgaria
7 points	Ireland	Lithuania
6 points	Israel	Belarus
5 points	Latvia	Norway
4 points	Macedonia	Slovenia
3 points	Ukraine	Serbia
2 points	Serbia	Macedonia
1 point	Denmark	Switzerland

Points awarded by Australia (Final)
Score	Televote	Jury
12 points	Belgium	Belgium
10 points	Bulgaria	Israel
8 points	Ukraine	Bulgaria
7 points	France	Lithuania
6 points	Malta	France
5 points	Russia	Spain
4 points	United Kingdom	United Kingdom
3 points	Austria	Netherlands
2 points	Spain	Ukraine
1 point	Lithuania	Croatia

==== Detailed voting results ====
The following members comprised the Australian jury:

- Monica Trapaga (jury chairperson) – singer, songwriter
- Shannon Noll – singer, songwriter
- Craig Porteils – music producer
- James Mathison – presenter, broadcaster
- Myf Warhurst – radio broadcaster, television personality

Detailed voting results from Australia (Semi-final 2)
R/O	Country	Jury							Televote	
R/O	Country	M. Trapaga	J. Mathison	S. Noll	C. Portelis	M. Warhurst	Rank	Points	Rank	Points
01	Latvia	7	8	15	12	10	11		6	5
02	Poland	10	16	17	17	14	17		11	
03	Switzerland	11	11	9	9	9	10	1	16	
04	Israel	2	3	3	2	2	2	10	5	6
05	Belarus	4	5	12	3	12	5	6	12	
06	Serbia	8	12	5	11	7	8	3	9	2
07	Ireland	9	14	16	15	17	16		4	7
08	Macedonia	13	2	14	16	4	9	2	7	4
09	Lithuania	5	4	4	6	6	4	7	3	8
10	Australia									
11	Slovenia	6	9	7	5	15	7	4	15	
12	Bulgaria	3	6	6	4	3	3	8	2	10
13	Denmark	12	15	10	13	11	13		10	1
14	Ukraine	14	10	11	10	8	12		8	3
15	Norway	16	7	1	8	5	6	5	13	
16	Georgia	17	17	13	7	16	15		14	
17	Albania	15	13	8	14	13	14		17	
18	Belgium	1	1	2	1	1	1	12	1	12

Detailed voting results from Australia (Final)
R/O	Country	Jury							Televote	
R/O	Country	M. Trapaga	J. Mathison	S. Noll	C. Portelis	M. Warhurst	Rank	Points	Rank	Points
01	Belgium	1	2	1	1	1	1	12	1	12
02	Czech Republic	18	23	4	14	22	16		25	
03	Netherlands	10	14	11	4	10	8	3	16	
04	Azerbaijan	7	20	15	15	11	12		22	
05	Hungary	22	6	10	24	23	19		19	
06	Italy	11	16	24	16	16	17		23	
07	Israel	4	3	3	2	2	2	10	14	
08	Bulgaria	2	1	7	3	3	3	8	2	10
09	Sweden	16	21	22	17	25	23		20	
10	Germany	19	12	16	12	17	14		21	
11	France	5	7	13	7	5	5	6	4	7
12	Poland	25	19	14	25	12	22		15	
13	Australia									
14	Cyprus	23	18	6	20	21	20		13	
15	Serbia	8	17	21	13	7	11		17	
16	Lithuania	6	4	5	5	4	4	7	10	1
17	Croatia	17	8	8	19	13	10	1	18	
18	Russia	24	13	17	22	8	18		6	5
19	Spain	3	5	18	6	6	6	5	9	2
20	Latvia	14	9	25	8	24	15		11	
21	Ukraine	13	10	9	9	9	9	2	3	8
22	Malta	15	24	19	18	14	21		5	6
23	Georgia	21	25	20	21	18	25		24	
24	Austria	20	15	23	23	20	24		8	3
25	United Kingdom	9	11	2	11	15	7	4	7	4
26	Armenia	12	22	12	10	19	13		12	
