= Carrousel (band) =

French-Swiss band

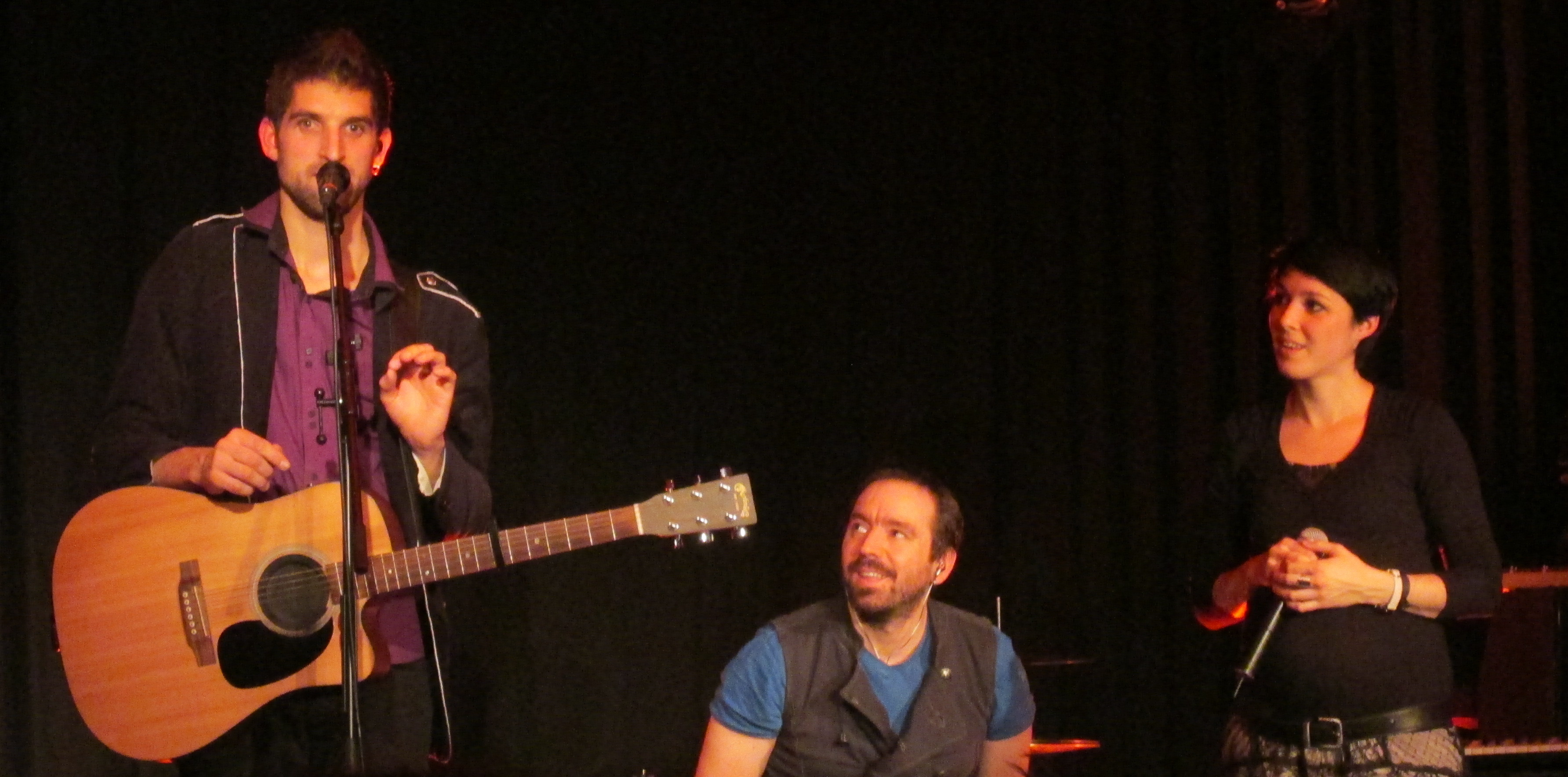
- Léonard Gogniat, Thierry Cattin, Sophie Burande

Background information
- Origin: Suisse romande, Switzerland
- Genres: European folk; world music; indie folk; indie pop; French pop; Nouvelle Chanson
- Years active: 2007–present
- Label: Melo-man (2011–)
- Members: Sophie Burande, Léonard Gogniat, Thierry Cattin, Christian Bron
- Website: https://www.carrousel-musique.com

Carrousel is a French-Swiss band which was founded in Southern France in the Summer of 2007. The band officially released their debut album Tandem on February 1, 2010 in France and Switzerland, their second album En équilibre followed in June 2012. At the same time they released a single titled "J'avais rendez-vous" in November 2012 and took part with this song in the Swiss national final in Bodensee, Switzerland. The Eurovision Song Contest 2013 was held in Malmö, Sweden. Carrousel finished the national final in second place with 17.26% of televoting after Heilsarmee's "You and Me" (which won the national final with 37.54% of the public voting).

== History ==
=== 2007–2011: Early years and Tandem ===
In the Summer of 2007, Sophie Burande from Auvergne, France who plays accordion and Léonard Gogniat from Switzerland who plays guitar met in Southern France. Since then they have never left each other, the Carrousel project started and they took stage for the first time in 2009 with a string of concerts. The duo won the Lausanne Radio Active Awards and Poly'Sons Montbrison in the same year.

The release of their debut album, Tandem followed and became a springboard for the band's musical career: their songs started to be heard on radio stations and it gave the band the opportunity to perform in famous events such as the Paléo Festival, Rock Oz'Arènes and Montreux Jazz Festival. Carrousel started to play outside of Switzerland and to be seen on the Télévision Suisse Romande's show "Passe-moi les Jumelles". Carrousel toured extensively during this period.

=== 2012–today: En équilibre, "J'avais rendez-vous" and summer tour ===
At the end of 2011, the band took a break from their first ever tour and started to prepare their second album, En équilibre. The duo wrote all the songs from the album and included a large number of other musicians. They explained that the album represents "The world of Carrousel with many instruments". The album was released in France by the L’Autre Distribution label. The band played a string of festivals and concerts across Switzerland in early 2012.

In November 2012, Radio Télévision Suisse (RTS), the French speaking national channel of Switzerland reported that Carrousel would compete in the Swiss national final of the Eurovision Song Contest 2013 in Kreuzlingen along with the other eight candidates. Carrousel announced that the song "J'avais rendez-vous" would be presented on December 15, 2013 in the Bodensee Arena. At the end of the televoting, "J'avais rendez-vous" became the runner-up of the show with 17.26% of public televoting, after the winner "You and Me" of Heilsarmee (which won the national final with 37.54% of public voting).

Participating in the Swiss Eurovision national final, rendered the band better-known to the Swiss German public, so Carrousel had a summer tour in 2013 through Switzerland, France and Germany. In late December 2013, they released a DVD and a CD album of their summer tour including their live performances titled Un tour de live.

== Discography ==
=== Albums ===
- Tandem (2010)
- En équilibre (2012)
- L'euphorie (2014)
- Filigrane (2017)

=== Singles ===
Year	Song	Peak chart positions		Album
Year	Song	SWI	FRA	Album
2012	"J'avais rendez-vous"	—	—	En équilibre (Edition deluxe)
2014	"Eva"	—	—	L'euphorie

=== DVDs ===
- Un tour de live (2013)
