= Switzerland in the Eurovision Song Contest 2016 =

- Eurovision Song Contest 2016
- Participating broadcaster: Swiss Broadcasting Corporation (SRG SSR)
- Country: Switzerland
- Selection process: ESC 2016 – die Entscheidungsshow
- Selection date: 13 February 2016

Competing entry
- Song: "The Last of Our Kind"
- Artist: Rykka
- Songwriters: Christina Maria Rieder; Mike James; Jeff Dawson; Warne Livesey

Placement
- Semi-final result: Failed to qualify (18th)

Participation chronology

Switzerland was represented at the Eurovision Song Contest 2016 with the song "The Last of Our Kind" written by Christina Maria Rieder, Mike James, Jeff Dawson and Warne Livesey. The song was performed by Rykka, which is the artistic name of singer Christina Maria Rieder. The Swiss entry for the 2016 contest in Stockholm, Sweden was selected through the national final ESC 2016 – die Entscheidungsshow, organised by the Swiss German speaking broadcaster Schweizer Radio und Fernsehen (SRF) in collaboration with the other broadcasters part of the Swiss Broadcasting Corporation (SRG SSR). Artists that were interested in entering the Swiss national final had the opportunity to apply to one of three open selections with defined submission periods organised by SRF together with the Swiss-Romansh broadcaster Radiotelevisiun Svizra Rumantscha (RTR), the Swiss-French broadcaster Radio Télévision Suisse (RTS) and/or the Swiss-Italian broadcaster Radiotelevisione svizzera (RSI). A total of 19 entries were selected to advance to an "Expert Check" round; ten entries were selected from the SRF/RTR selection, six entries were selected from the RTS selection and three entries were selected from the RSI selection. The "Expert Check" was held on 6 December 2015 and involved four experts evaluating the live performances of the 19 entries and selecting six entries to advance to the televised national final—three artists and songs from the SRF/RTR candidates, two from the RTS candidates and one from the RSI candidates. The six finalists performed during the national final on 13 February 2016 where a combination of jury voting and public voting ultimately selected "The Last of Our Kind" performed by Rykka as the winner.

Switzerland was drawn to compete in the second semi-final of the Eurovision Song Contest which took place on 12 May 2016. Performing during the show in position 3, "The Last of Our Kind" was not announced among the top 10 entries of the second semi-final and therefore did not qualify to compete in the final. It was later revealed that Switzerland placed eighteenth (last) out of the 18 participating countries in the semi-final with 28 points.

== Background ==
Prior to the 2016 contest, Switzerland had participated in the Eurovision Song Contest fifty-six times since its first entry in 1956. Switzerland is noted for having won the first edition of the Eurovision Song Contest with the song "Refrain" performed by Lys Assia. Their second and, to this point, most recent victory was achieved in 1988 when Canadian singer Céline Dion won the contest with the song "Ne partez pas sans moi". Following the introduction of semi-finals for the 2004, Switzerland had managed to participate in the final four times up to this point. In 2005, the internal selection of Estonian girl band Vanilla Ninja, performing the song "Cool Vibes", qualified Switzerland to the final where they placed 8th. Due to their successful result in 2005, Switzerland was pre-qualified to compete directly in the final in 2006. Between 2007 and 2010, the nation failed to qualify to the final after a string of internal selections. Since opting to organize a national final from 2011 onwards, Switzerland has managed to qualify to the final twice out of the last five years. In 2015, Switzerland earned one of their lowest results of all-time, with Mélanie René and her song "Time to Shine" placing last in their semi-final earning only 4 points.

The Swiss national broadcaster, Swiss Broadcasting Corporation (SRG SSR), broadcasts the event within Switzerland and organises the selection process for the nation's entry. SRG SSR confirmed their intentions to participate at the 2016 Eurovision Song Contest on 20 July 2015. Along with their participation confirmation, the broadcaster also announced that the Swiss entry for the 2016 contest would be selected through a national final. Switzerland has selected their entry for the Eurovision Song Contest through both national finals and internal selections in the past. Between 2005 and 2010, the Swiss entry was internally selected for the competition. Since 2011, the broadcaster has opted to organize a national final in order to select their entry.

== Before Eurovision ==
=== ESC 2016 – die Entscheidungsshow ===
ESC 2016 – die Entscheidungsshow was the sixth edition of the Swiss national final format that selected Switzerland's entry for the Eurovision Song Contest 2016. The national final was a collaboration between four broadcasters in Switzerland: the Swiss-German broadcaster Schweizer Radio und Fernsehen (SRF), the Swiss-French broadcaster Radio Télévision Suisse (RTS), the Swiss-Italian broadcaster Radiotelevisione svizzera (RSI) and the Swiss-Romansh broadcaster Radiotelevisiun Svizra Rumantscha (RTR). The show took place on 13 February 2016 at the Bodensee Arena in Kreuzlingen, hosted by Sven Epiney and was televised on SRF 1, RSI La 2 with Italian commentary by Clarissa Tami and RTS Deux with French commentary by Nicolas Tanner and Jean-Marc Richard. The competition was also streamed online at the respective official website of each Swiss broadcaster as well as at the official Eurovision Song Contest website eurovision.tv.

==== Selection process ====
The selection process took place in three stages before the finalists for the live show and ultimately the winner are selected. The first stage of the competition included SRF/RTR, RTS and RSI each conducting varying selections in order to determine the candidates they submitted for the second stage of the competition. SRF/RTR submitted ten candidates, RTS submitted six candidates and RSI submitted three candidates. The second stage was the Expert Check live audition, where the 19 selected candidates performed the songs that qualified from their respective broadcaster selections. A jury panel selected three artists and songs to qualify from the SRF/RTR selection, two from the RTS selection and one from the RSI selection. The six artists and songs proceed to the third stage, the televised national final, where the winning artist and song was selected to represent Switzerland in Stockholm.

- The SRF/RTR selection involved an online internet voting platform where interested artists could submit their songs and have them listed for public listening. The platform accepted entries between 28 September 2015 and 26 October 2015. 167 entries were submitted following the submission deadline, including entries from 1997 Swiss entrant Barbara Berta and 2005 and 2017 Slovenian entrant Omar Naber. Internet users had between 2 and 16 November 2015 to vote for their favourite entries and their votes were combined with the votes from an expert jury. The jury included the head of shows and events at SRF Sven Sarbach, entertainment program developer for SRF Martin Bloch, vocal coach Tanja Dankner, producer Yvan Peacemaker, Radio SRF 3 host Michel Birri and 360° Show Production AG representative Denise Vogel. On 24 November 2015, the top ten entries for the "Expert Check" were announced.
- The RTS selection involved interested artists submitting their entries to the broadcaster between 17 July 2015 and 23 October 2015. Following an internal selection, the six candidates for the "Expert Check" were announced on 24 November 2015.
- RSI opened a submission period between 24 July 2015 and 26 October 2015 for interested artists and composers to submit their entries. On 9 November 2015, a jury panel consisting of 2008 Swiss contest entrant Paolo Meneguzzi, 2012 Swiss contest entrant Gabriel Broggini (Sinplus) and Simone Tomassini evaluated the 30 entry submissions received and selected the three candidates that proceeded to the "Expert Check".

==== Expert Check ====
The "Expert Check" of the nineteen selected candidates was webcast from SRF Studio 5 in Zürich on 6 December 2015 and was hosted by Sven Epiney. The candidates performed their songs in front of an expert panel which assessed the performers on criteria such as live performance skills, voice quality and stage presence. The expert panel consisted of choreographer Rafael Antonio, vocal coach and singer Tanja Dankner, SRF Eurovision editor Daniel Meister (representative of SRF), the director of Option Musique Catherine Colombara (representative of RTS), and musician Andrea Bignasca (representative of RSI). Three artists and songs qualified from the SRF/RTR selection, two from the RTS selection and one from the RSI selection. "Perché mi guardi cosi?" performed by Stéphanie Palazzo was originally selected to advance from the "Expert Check", however the song was disqualified on 11 December 2015 as it was published, originally in French, prior to the 1 September 2015 deadline, making it ineligible for the Eurovision Song Contest. "Disque d'or" performed by Kaceo was selected as the replacement entry from the RTS candidates.

Expert Check – 6 December 2015
Channel	R/O	Artist	Song	Result
RTS	1	Loïc Schumacher	"Génération demain"	—N/a
RTS	2	~~Stéphanie Palazzo~~	~~"Perché mi guardi così?"~~	Disqualified
RTS	3	Kaceo	"Disque d'or"	Advanced
RTS	4	Stéphanie Sandoz	"Flashback"	—N/a
RTS	5	Bella C	"Another World"	Advanced
RTS	6	Gina von Glasow	"Left with an Idiot"	—N/a
RSI	7	Nathalie Cadlini	"Share Love"	—N/a
RSI	8	Theo	"Because of You"	Advanced
RSI	9	Elias	"Elephant"	—N/a
SRF/RTR	10	Stanley Miller	"Feel the Love"	Advanced
SRF/RTR	11	Maika	"The Reason"	—N/a
SRF/RTR	12	Erica Arnold	"Ich bin ich"	—N/a
SRF/RTR	13	Platzhirsch	"Holz vor dr Hütta"	—N/a
SRF/RTR	14	Samuel Tobias Klauser	"Asking Me Why"	—N/a
SRF/RTR	15	Rykka	"The Last of Our Kind"	Advanced
SRF/RTR	16	Evelyn Zangger	"Have a Little Faith in Me"	—N/a
SRF/RTR	17	Sunanda	"Ooops!?!"	—N/a
SRF/RTR	18	Vincent Gross	"Half a Smile"	Advanced
SRF/RTR	19	Patric Scott feat. Abdullah Alhussainy	"No Boundaries"	—N/a

Competing entries
Artist	Song	Songwriter(s)
Bella C	"Another World"	Ricardo Sanz, Steven Parry, Borislava Panosetti
Kaceo	"Disque d'or"	Nicolas Vivier, Karim Maghraoui, Luis Pisconte, Florian Casarsa, Quentin Mathieu, Oxsa
Rykka	"The Last of Our Kind"	Christina Maria Rieder, Mike James, Jeff Dawson, Warne Livesey
Stanley Miller	"Feel the Love"	William Luque, Natascia Da Prato
Theo	"Because of You"	Matteo Rossi
Vincent Gross	"Half a Smile"	Charlie Mason

==== Final ====
The final took place on 13 February 2016. The show consisted of two parts: in the first part the six candidate songs in contention to represent Switzerland were performed and in the second part each artist performed a cover version of a song of their choice. The combination of televoting (50%) and the votes of an expert jury (50%) selected "The Last of Our Kind" performed by Rykka as the winner. The jury consisted of Peter Ramón Baumann (Vice President of OGAE Switzerland), Yvan Peacemaker (producer), Hana Gadze (music editor SRF), Mélanie René (singer, Swiss Eurovision contestant in 2015), Flavio Tuor (music producer RTR), Laurent Pavia (music producer RTS), Licia Chery (singer, 3rd in the 2015 Swiss selection), Priscille Alber (music programmer), Romina Bruschi (singer) and Nicola Locarnini (musician).

In addition to the performances from the competing artists, Austrian Eurovision Song Contest 2014 winner Conchita Wurst opened the show with her song "Firestorm" and also performed "Rise Like a Phoenix" as the interval act together with Flavio Rizzello, the winner of the talent show competition Die grössten Schweizer Talente.

Final – 13 February 2016
R/O	Artist	Song	R/O	Song (Original artists)	Place
1	Vincent Gross	"Half a Smile"	7	"Astronaut" (Sido ft. Andreas Bourani)	3
2	Bella C	"Another World"	8	"Empire State of Mind (Part II) Broken Down" (Alicia Keys)	2
3	Kaceo	"Disque d'or"	9	"Video Killed the Radio Star" (The Buggles)	6
4	Theo	"Because of You"	10	"Photograph" (Ed Sheeran)	5
5	Rykka	"The Last of Our Kind"	11	"Love Me Like You Do" (Ellie Goulding)	1
6	Stanley Miller	"Feel the Love"	12	"Hello" (Adele)	4

=== Promotion ===
Rykka made several appearances across Europe to specifically promote "The Last of Our Kind" as the Swiss Eurovision entry. On 2 April, Rykka performed during the Eurovision PreParty Riga, which was organised by OGAE Latvia and held at the Spikeri Concert Hall in Riga, Latvia. On 3 April, they performed during the Eurovision Pre-Party, which was held at the Izvestia Hall in Moscow, Russia and hosted by Dmitry Guberniev. On 9 April, Rykka performed during the Eurovision in Concert event which was held at the Melkweg venue in Amsterdam, Netherlands and hosted by Cornald Maas and Hera Björk. Between 11 and 13 April, Rykka took part in promotional activities in Tel Aviv, Israel and performed during the Israel Calling event held at the Ha'teatron venue. In addition to Rykka's international appearances, they also held two concerts in Switzerland in the lead up to the Eurovision Song Contest: on 26 March at the Smuk Cafe Bar in Basel and on 20 April at the Amboss Rampe in Zürich. On 30 April, Rykka performed "The Last of Our Kind" during the SRF 1 programme Hello Again.

== At Eurovision ==
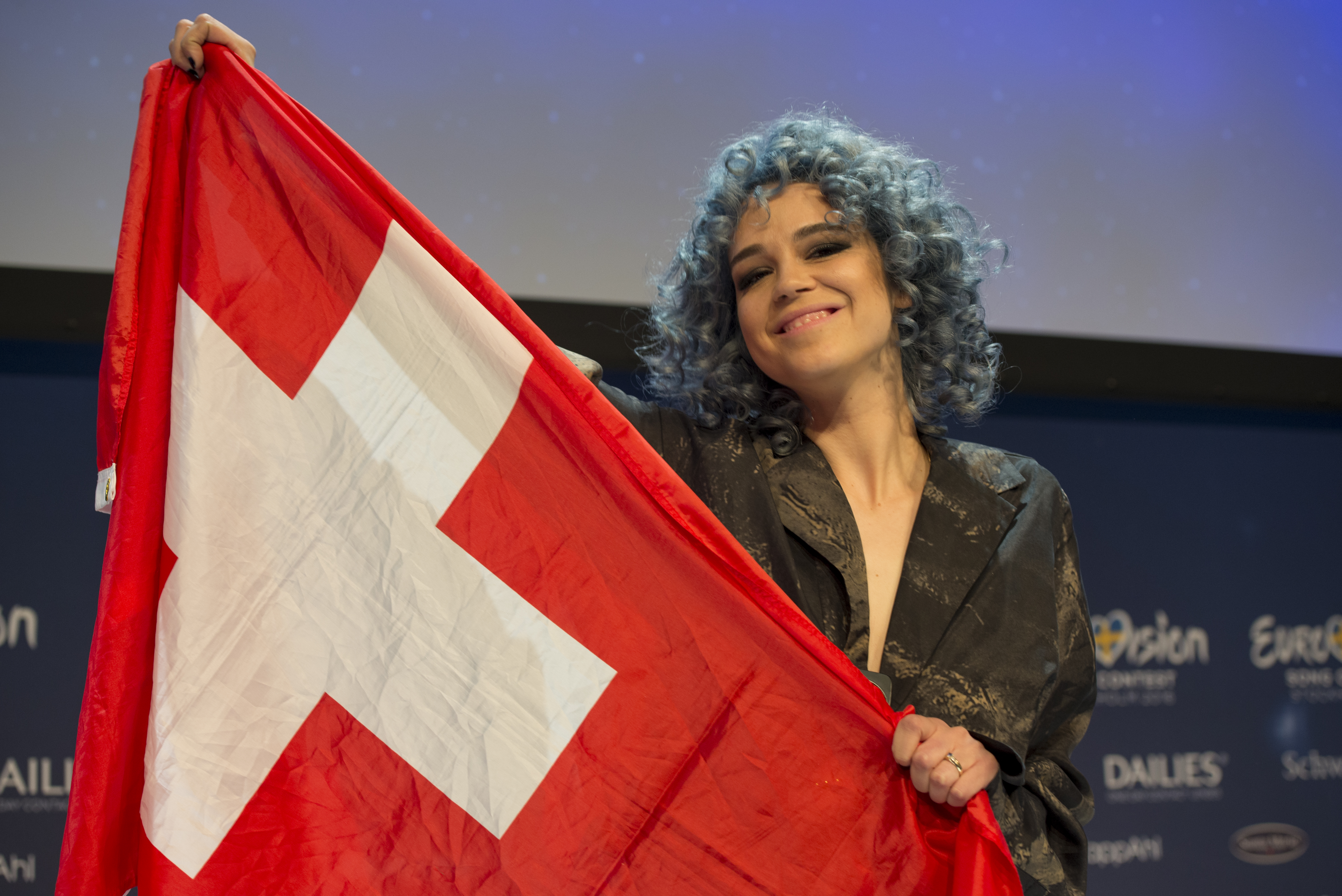
Rykka during a press meet and greet

According to Eurovision rules, all nations with the exceptions of the host country and the "Big Five" (France, Germany, Italy, Spain and the United Kingdom) are required to qualify from one of two semi-finals in order to compete for the final; the top ten countries from each semi-final progress to the final. The European Broadcasting Union (EBU) split up the competing countries into six different pots based on voting patterns from previous contests, with countries with favourable voting histories put into the same pot. On 25 January 2016, a special allocation draw was held which placed each country into one of the two semi-finals, as well as which half of the show they would perform in. Switzerland was placed into the second semi-final, to be held on 12 May 2016, and was scheduled to perform in the first half of the show.

Once all the competing songs for the 2016 contest had been released, the running order for the semi-finals was decided by the shows' producers rather than through another draw, so that similar songs were not placed next to each other. Switzerland was set to perform in position 3, following the entry from Poland and before the entry from Israel.

In Switzerland, three broadcasters that form SRG SSR aired the contest. Sven Epiney provided German commentary for both semi-finals airing on SRF zwei and the final airing on SRF 1. German commentary was also provided by Peter Schneider and Gabriel Vetter for the final on Radio SRF 3 and via dual channel audio on SRF 1. Jean-Marc Richard and Nicolas Tanner provided French commentary for the second semi-final and the final on RTS Deux. Clarissa Tami provided Italian commentary for the second semi-final on RSI La 2 and then was joined by Michele "Cerno" Carobbio to provide commentary for the final on RSI La 1. The Swiss spokesperson, who announced the top 12-point score awarded by the Swiss jury during the final, was 2014 Swiss Eurovision Song Contest entrant Sebalter.

=== Semi-final ===
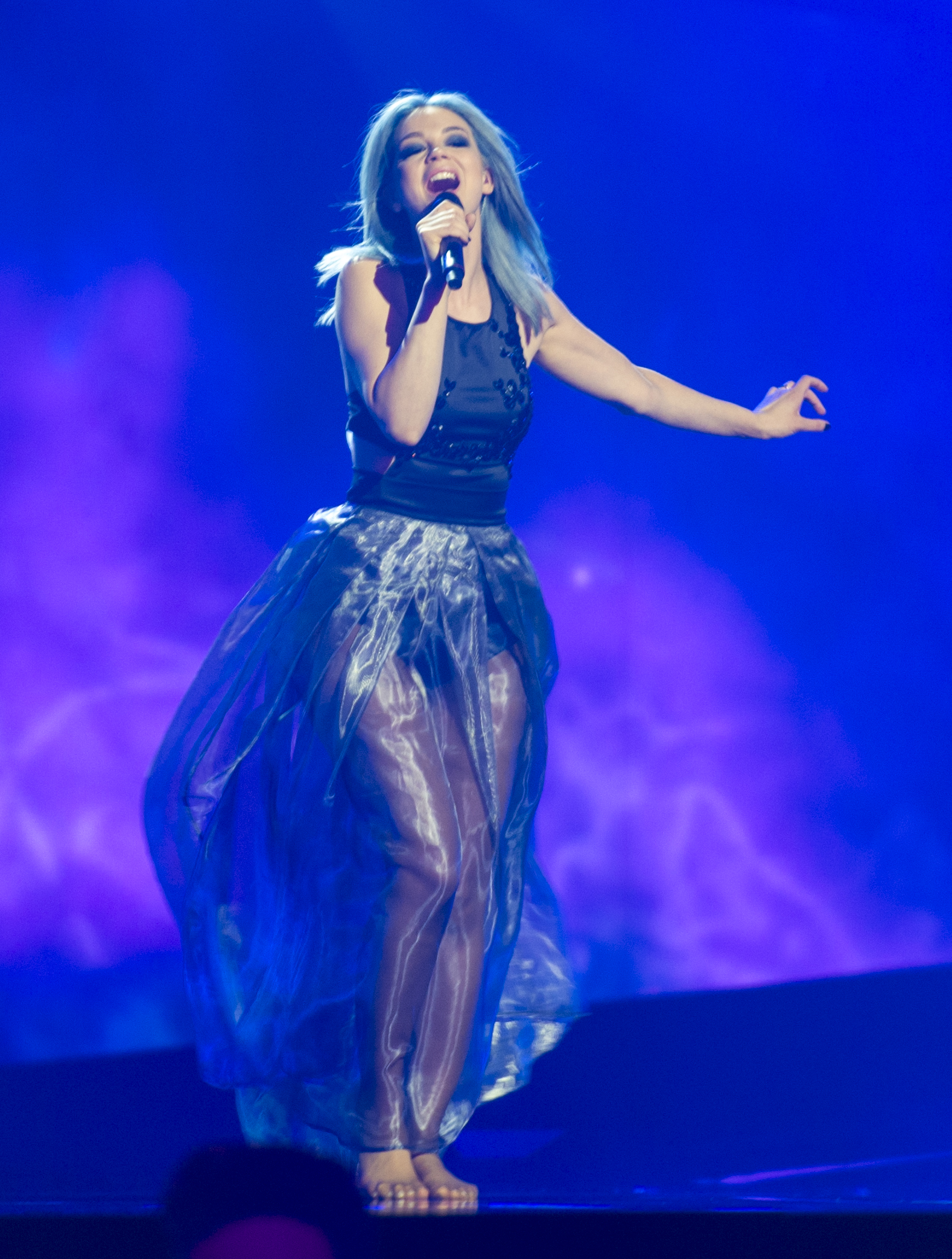
Rykka during a rehearsal before the second semi-final

Rykka took part in technical rehearsals on 4 and 7 May, followed by dress rehearsals on 11 and 12 May. This included the jury show on 11 May where the professional juries of each country watched and voted on the competing entries.

The Swiss performance featured Rykka performing alone on stage in black dress with a long transparent skirt designed by Lyn Lingerie. The stage was set in a predominately blue and purple colours and the performance featured several effects including smoke emitting from Rykka's bra and a pyrotechnic waterfall. Rykka was joined by three off-stage backing vocalists: Tanja Dankner, Nyssina Swerissen and Brandy Butler.

At the end of the show, Switzerland was not announced among the top 10 entries in the second semi-final and therefore failed to qualify to compete in the final. It was later revealed that Switzerland placed eighteenth (last) in the semi-final, receiving a total of 28 points: 3 points from the televoting and 25 points from the juries.

=== Voting ===
Voting during the three shows was conducted under a new system that involved each country now awarding two sets of points from 1-8, 10 and 12: one from their professional jury and the other from televoting. Each nation's jury consisted of five music industry professionals who are citizens of the country they represent, with their names published before the contest to ensure transparency. This jury judged each entry based on: vocal capacity; the stage performance; the song's composition and originality; and the overall impression by the act. In addition, no member of a national jury was permitted to be related in any way to any of the competing acts in such a way that they cannot vote impartially and independently. The individual rankings of each jury member as well as the nation's televoting results were released shortly after the grand final.

Below is a breakdown of points awarded to Switzerland and awarded by Switzerland in the second semi-final and grand final of the contest, and the breakdown of the jury voting and televoting conducted during the two shows:

==== Points awarded to Switzerland ====
Points awarded to Switzerland (Semi-final 2)
Score	Televote	Jury
12 points		
10 points		
8 points		
7 points		Georgia; Slovenia
6 points		
5 points		Ireland
4 points		
3 points	Albania	
2 points		Denmark
1 point		Australia; Belgium; Germany; Israel

==== Points awarded by Switzerland ====
Points awarded by Switzerland (Semi-final 2)
Score	Televote	Jury
12 points	Serbia	Australia
10 points	Albania	Israel
8 points	Belgium	Lithuania
7 points	Poland	Belgium
6 points	Australia	Latvia
5 points	Ukraine	Ukraine
4 points	Macedonia	Bulgaria
3 points	Bulgaria	Serbia
2 points	Ireland	Norway
1 point	Denmark	Belarus

Points awarded by Switzerland (Final)
Score	Televote	Jury
12 points	Serbia	Australia
10 points	Austria	Belgium
8 points	Germany	Israel
7 points	Italy	Lithuania
6 points	Russia	Ukraine
5 points	Poland	Netherlands
4 points	Ukraine	Austria
3 points	France	Latvia
2 points	Spain	Italy
1 point	Australia	Bulgaria

==== Detailed voting results ====
The following members comprised the Swiss jury:

- Ramon Rey (jury chairperson) – Head of Marketing and A&R TBA/Phonag AG
- Charlie Roe – singer, songwriter
- Luca Hänni – singer, songwriter, later represented Switzerland in the 2019 contest
- Tshanda Sangwa – singer, pianist
- Viola Tami – presenter, actress

Detailed voting results from Switzerland (Semi-final 2)
R/O	Country	Jury							Televote	
R/O	Country	R. Rey	C. Roe	L. Hänni	T. Sangwa	V. Tami	Rank	Points	Rank	Points
01	Latvia	8	3	8	3	4	5	6	13	
02	Poland	11	16	7	13	14	13		4	7
03	Switzerland									
04	Israel	1	5	2	2	5	2	10	14	
05	Belarus	3	12	17	11	11	10	1	16	
06	Serbia	12	7	16	10	6	8	3	1	12
07	Ireland	9	15	12	16	16	15		9	2
08	Macedonia	17	17	15	14	12	17		7	4
09	Lithuania	2	6	1	7	2	3	8	11	
10	Australia	7	2	4	1	1	1	12	5	6
11	Slovenia	16	11	10	15	13	14		17	
12	Bulgaria	6	8	3	9	10	7	4	8	3
13	Denmark	10	13	11	17	17	16		10	1
14	Ukraine	5	9	5	5	7	6	5	6	5
15	Norway	13	14	13	6	8	9	2	12	
16	Georgia	15	4	9	12	15	11		15	
17	Albania	14	10	14	8	9	12		2	10
18	Belgium	4	1	6	4	3	4	7	3	8

Detailed voting results from Switzerland (Final)
R/O	Country	Jury							Televote	
R/O	Country	R. Rey	C. Roe	L. Hänni	T. Sangwa	V. Tami	Rank	Points	Rank	Points
01	Belgium	7	1	5	3	5	2	10	14	
02	Czech Republic	21	12	8	18	21	16		24	
03	Netherlands	5	13	10	6	11	6	5	12	
04	Azerbaijan	19	23	9	21	19	20		25	
05	Hungary	14	25	11	22	25	22		16	
06	Italy	3	3	20	19	9	9	2	4	7
07	Israel	4	10	2	4	6	3	8	21	
08	Bulgaria	13	9	1	20	17	10	1	13	
09	Sweden	12	18	12	12	7	11		11	
10	Germany	15	14	6	23	18	15		3	8
11	France	17	17	16	11	22	18		8	3
12	Poland	24	24	13	24	23	25		6	5
13	Australia	6	2	3	2	1	1	12	10	1
14	Cyprus	25	22	15	25	20	24		19	
15	Serbia	18	7	14	10	16	13		1	12
16	Lithuania	2	11	4	9	4	4	7	18	
17	Croatia	23	16	22	26	26	26		15	
18	Russia	8	26	21	13	12	17		5	6
19	Spain	11	20	17	15	8	14		9	2
20	Latvia	20	4	7	7	10	8	3	20	
21	Ukraine	10	5	18	1	3	5	6	7	4
22	Malta	16	21	23	17	15	21		26	
23	Georgia	26	6	26	16	24	23		23	
24	Austria	1	15	24	5	2	7	4	2	10
25	United Kingdom	9	8	19	14	13	12		22	
26	Armenia	22	19	25	8	14	19		17	
