= Switzerland in the Eurovision Song Contest 2013 =

- Eurovision Song Contest 2013
- Participating broadcaster: Swiss Broadcasting Corporation (SRG SSR)
- Country: Switzerland
- Selection process: Die grosse Entscheidungs Show 2013
- Selection date: 15 December 2012

Competing entry
- Song: "You and Me"
- Artist: Takasa
- Songwriters: Georg Schlunegger; Roman Camenzind; Fred Herrmann

Placement
- Semi-final result: Failed to qualify (13th)

Participation chronology

Switzerland was represented at the Eurovision Song Contest 2013 with the song "You and Me" written by Georg Schlunegger, Roman Camenzind and Fred Herrmann. The song was performed by the band Takasa. The Swiss entry for the 2013 contest in Malmö, Sweden was selected through the national final Die grosse Entscheidungs Show 2013, organised by the Swiss German speaking broadcaster Schweizer Fernsehen (SF) in collaboration with the other broadcasters part of the Swiss Broadcasting Corporation (SRG SSR). SF, the Swiss-French broadcaster Radio Télévision Suisse (RTS) and the Swiss-Italian broadcaster Radiotelevisione svizzera (RSI) each conducted varying selections and a total of nine entries were selected to advance to the televised national final—four artists and songs from the SF selection, three from the RTS selection and two from the RSI selection. The nine finalists performed during the national final on 15 December 2012 where public voting ultimately selected "You and Me" performed by Heilsarmee as the winner. The group was renamed as Takasa for the Eurovision Song Contest in order to prevent violating the rules of the competition.

Switzerland was drawn to compete in the second semi-final of the Eurovision Song Contest which took place on 16 May 2013. Performing during the show in position 16, "You and Me" was not announced among the top 10 entries of the second semi-final and therefore did not qualify to compete in the final. It was later revealed that Switzerland placed thirteenth out of the 17 participating countries in the semi-final with 41 points.

== Background ==
Prior to the 2013 contest, Switzerland had participated in the Eurovision Song Contest fifty-three times since its first entry in 1956. Switzerland is noted for having won the first edition of the Eurovision Song Contest with the song "Refrain" performed by Lys Assia. Their second and, to this point, most recent victory was achieved in 1988 when Canadian singer Céline Dion won the contest with the song "Ne partez pas sans moi". Following the introduction of semi-finals for the 2004, Switzerland had managed to participate in the final three times up to this point. In 2005, the internal selection of Estonian girl band Vanilla Ninja, performing the song "Cool Vibes", qualified Switzerland to the final where they placed 8th. Due to their successful result in 2005, Switzerland was pre-qualified to compete directly in the final in 2006. Between 2007 and 2010, the nation failed to qualify to the final after a string of internal selections. Since opting to organize a national final from 2011 onwards, Switzerland has managed to qualify to the final once out of the last two years. In 2012, Sinplus and their song "Unbreakable" failed to qualify Switzerland to the final placing 11th in their semi-final.

The Swiss national broadcaster, Swiss Broadcasting Corporation (SRG SSR), broadcasts the event within Switzerland and organises the selection process for the nation's entry. SRG SSR confirmed their intentions to participate at the 2013 Eurovision Song Contest on 28 May 2012. Along with their participation confirmation, the broadcaster also announced that the Swiss entry for the 2013 contest would be selected through a national final. Switzerland has selected their entry for the Eurovision Song Contest through both national finals and internal selections in the past. Between 2005 and 2010, the Swiss entry was internally selected for the competition. Since 2011, the broadcaster has opted to organize a national final in order to select their entry.

== Before Eurovision ==
=== Die grosse Entscheidungs Show 2013 ===
Die grosse Entscheidungs Show 2013 was the third edition of the Swiss national final format that selected Switzerland's entry for the Eurovision Song Contest 2013. The national final was a collaboration between three broadcasters in Switzerland: the Swiss-German broadcaster Schweizer Fernsehen (SF), the Swiss-French broadcaster Radio Télévision Suisse (RTS) and the Swiss-Italian broadcaster Radiotelevisione svizzera (RSI). The show took place on 15 December 2012 at the Bodensee Arena in Kreuzlingen, hosted by Sven Epiney and was televised on SRF 1, RSI La 2 with Italian commentary by Sandy Altermatt and RTS Deux with French commentary by Valérie Ogier and Jean-Marc Richard. The competition was also streamed online at the respective official website of each Swiss broadcaster.

==== Selection process ====
The selection process took place in two stages before the finalists for the live show and ultimately the winner are selected. The first stage of the competition included SF, RTS and RSI each conducting varying selections in order to determine the candidates they submitted for the second stage of the competition. SF submitted four candidates, RTS submitted three candidates and RSI submitted two candidates. The nine artists and songs proceed to the second stage, the televised national final, where the winning artist and song was selected to represent Switzerland in Malmö.

- The SF selection involved an online internet voting platform where interested artists could submit their songs and have them listed for public listening. The platform accepted entries between 1 September 2012 and 8 October 2012. 175 entries were submitted following the submission deadline, including entries from Swiss 1956 Eurovision winner as well as 1957 and 1958 entrant Lys Assia, 1983 and 1985 Swiss entrant Mariella Farré, 1996, 2002 and 2005 Cypriot entrant Constantinos Christoforou, 2009 Dutch entrant Gordon Heuckeroth (as part of the group LA The Voices) and 2011 Polish entrant Magdalena Tul. Internet users had between 15 and 29 October 2012 to vote for their favourite entries and their votes were combined with the votes from an expert jury. On 12 November 2012, the top four entries and SF candidates for the national final were announced.
- Following an internal selection, the three RTS candidates for the national final were announced on 5 November 2012.
- RSI opened a submission period between 1 September 2012 and 30 September 2012 for interested artists and composers to submit their entries. On 9 October 2012, a jury panel consisting of Nicola Albertoni, Daniela Tami and Gianluca Verga evaluated over 30 entry submissions received and selected six songs for a regional final. The winner of the singing competition Fattore Voce 2012 Sohaila El Shater was awarded a wildcard to proceed directly to the selection. The regional final, hosted by Pablo Creti, took place on 23 October 2012 from the Lugano Living Room in Lugano and was broadcast via radio on RSI Rete Tre. Public televoting and an expert jury each selected one of the two RSI candidates for the national final.

Public vote qualifier Jury qualifier

RSI selection – 23 October 2012
| R/O | Artist | Song | Result |
|---|---|---|---|
| 1 | N2L | "Smoke Out" | —N/a |
| 2 | Vanda Palma | "La farfalla va" | —N/a |
| 3 | Theo | "My Wonderful Life" | —N/a |
| 4 | Sohaila | "But Who" | —N/a |
| 5 | Marilise | "Nobody" | —N/a |
| 6 | Chiara Dubey | "Bella sera" | Advanced |
| 7 | Ally | "Catch Me" | Advanced |

Competing entries
| Artist | Song | Songwriter(s) | Channel |
|---|---|---|---|
| Ally | "Catch Me" | Tancredi Barbuscia, Francesco Colombo | RSI |
| Anthony Bighead | "Do the Monkey" | Anthony Ackermann | SF |
| Carrousel | "J'avais rendez-vous" | Sophie Burande, Léonard Gogniat | RTS |
| Chiara Dubey | "Bella sera" | Chiara Dubey | RSI |
| Heilsarmee | "You and Me" | Georg Schlunegger, Roman Camenzind, Fred Herrmann | SF |
| Jesse Ritch | "Forever & a Day" | Thomas J. Gyger, Fredrik Strömberg, Jesse Ritch | SF |
| Melissa | "The Point of No Return" | Rafael de Alba | SF |
| Nicolas Fraissinet | "Lève-toi" | Nicolas Fraissinet | RTS |
| Nill Klemm | "On My Way" | Nill Klemm | RTS |

==== Final ====
The final took place on 15 December 2012. The nine candidate songs in contention to represent Switzerland were performed and televoting solely selected "You and Me" performed by Heilsarmee as the winner. An international panel of Swiss residents with roots in different European countries, consisting of Hella von Sinnen (Germany), Sanna Thöresson (Sweden), Danijel Ivanović (Serbia), Claudio Martella (Italy) and Mali Demren (Turkey), also provided commentary and feedback to the entries. In addition to the performances from the competing entries, Swiss Eurovision Song Contest 2012 entrants Sinplus performed their song "Turn On the Lights" as the interval act.

Final – 15 December 2012
| R/O | Artist | Song | Televote | Place |
|---|---|---|---|---|
| 1 | Ally | "Catch Me" | 0.79% | 9 |
| 2 | Chiara Dubey | "Bella sera" | 9.04% | 5 |
| 3 | Carrousel | "J'avais rendez-vous" | 17.26% | 2 |
| 4 | Anthony Bighead | "Do the Monkey" | 5.66% | 7 |
| 5 | Heilsarmee | "You and Me" | 37.54% | 1 |
| 6 | Nill Klemm | "On My Way" | 1.69% | 8 |
| 7 | Melissa | "The Point of No Return" | 9.72% | 4 |
| 8 | Nicolas Fraissinet | "Lève-toi" | 6.55% | 6 |
| 9 | Jesse Ritch | "Forever & a Day" | 11.75% | 3 |

=== Preparation ===
Following Die grosse Entscheidungs Show 2013, the European Broadcasting Union (EBU) required Heilsarmee to change their band name and uniforms they wore during the national final for the Eurovision Song Contest; Heilsarmee is the German title of the Christian denominational charitable organisation The Salvation Army which violates the contest rules that forbid the promotion of political and religious content. The band would later change their name to Takasa, which is the Swahili word for "Clean".

=== Promotion ===
Takasa made several appearances across Europe to specifically promote "You and Me" as the Swiss Eurovision entry. The band performed "You and Me" during the final of the Maltese Eurovision national final on 2 February and the Bulgarian Eurovision national final Bylgarskata pesen za Evroviziya 2013 on 11 March. On 2 April, Takasa appeared in the M1 morning programme Ma reggel in Hungary. On 13 April, Takasa performed during the Eurovision in Concert event which was held at the Melkweg venue in Amsterdam, Netherlands and hosted by Marlayne and Linda Wagenmakers.

== At Eurovision ==
According to Eurovision rules, all nations with the exceptions of the host country and the "Big Five" (France, Germany, Italy, Spain and the United Kingdom) are required to qualify from one of two semi-finals in order to compete for the final; the top ten countries from each semi-final progress to the final. The European Broadcasting Union (EBU) split up the competing countries into six different pots based on voting patterns from previous contests, with countries with favourable voting histories put into the same pot. On 17 January 2013, a special allocation draw was held which placed each country into one of the two semi-finals, as well as which half of the show they would perform in. Switzerland was placed into the second semi-final, to be held on 16 May 2013, and was scheduled to perform in the second half of the show.

Once all the competing songs for the 2013 contest had been released, the running order for the semi-finals was decided by the shows' producers rather than through another draw, so that similar songs were not placed next to each other. Romania was set to perform in position 16, following the entry from Georgia and before the entry from Romania.

In Switzerland, three broadcasters that form SRG SSR aired the contest. Sven Epiney provided German commentary for both semi-finals airing on SRF zwei and the final airing on SRF 1. Jean-Marc Richard and Nicolas Tanner provided French commentary for the second semi-final and the final on RTS Deux. Alessandro Bertoglio provided Italian commentary for the second semi-final on RSI La 2 and the final on RSI La 1. The Swiss spokesperson, who announced the Swiss votes during the final, was Mélanie Freymond.

=== Semi-final ===
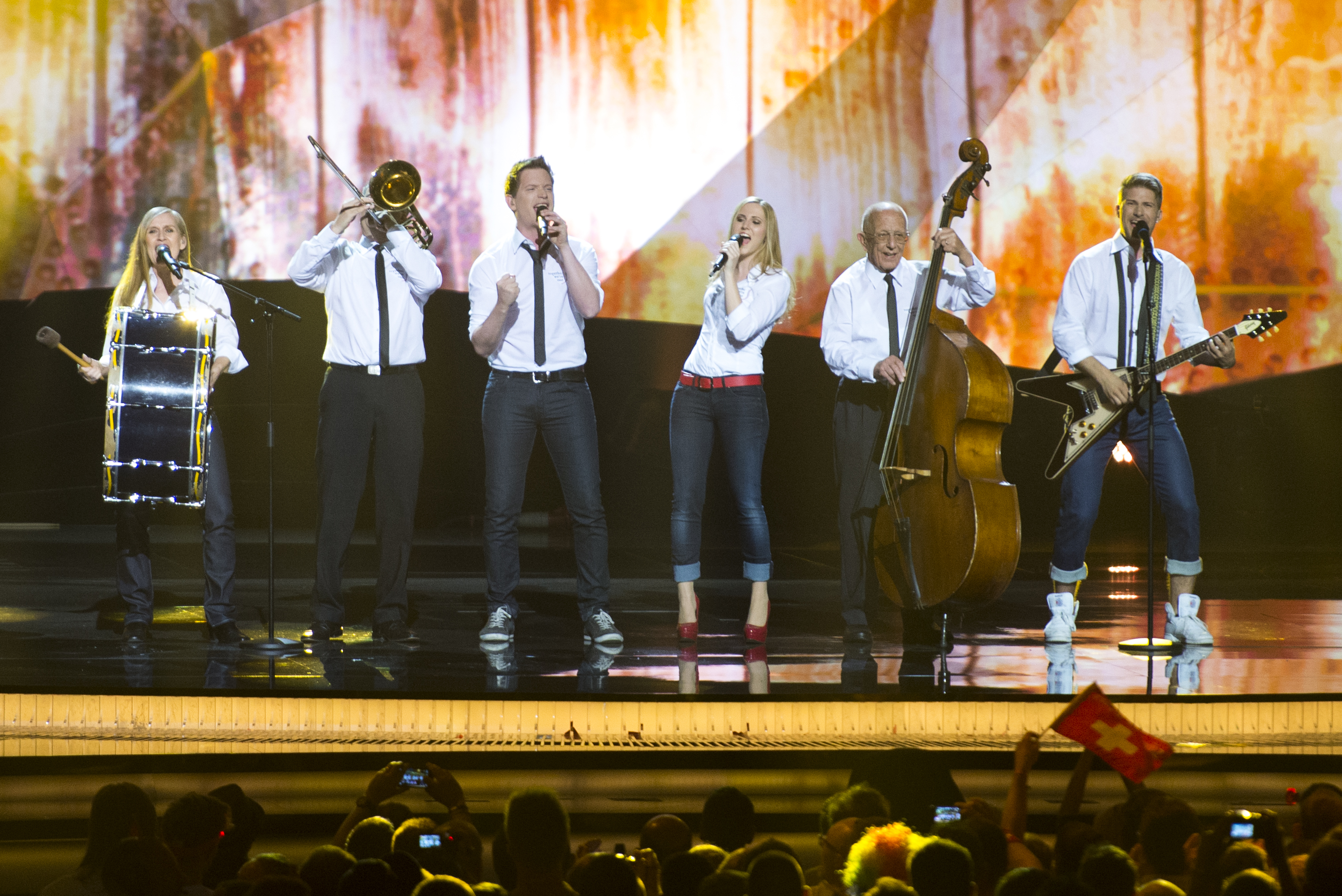
Takasa during a rehearsal before the second semi-final

Takasa took part in technical rehearsals on 9 and 11 May, followed by dress rehearsals on 15 and 16 May. This included the jury show on 15 May where the professional juries of each country watched and voted on the competing entries.

The Swiss performance featured the members of Takasa performing on stage in one line wearing white shirts and blouses with either jeans or dark blue trousers. The projector screens displayed reddish-brown pattern features and an iron girder motif. Among the members of the band was double-bassist Emil Ramsauer, who currently holds the record of being the oldest musician to perform at the Eurovision Song Contest at the age of 95.

At the end of the show, Switzerland was not announced among the top 10 entries in the second semi-final and therefore failed to qualify to compete in the final. It was later revealed that Switzerland placed thirteenth in the semi-final, receiving a total of 41 points.

=== Voting ===
Voting during the three shows consisted of 50 percent public televoting and 50 percent from a jury deliberation. The jury consisted of five music industry professionals who were citizens of the country they represent. This jury was asked to judge each contestant based on: vocal capacity; the stage performance; the song's composition and originality; and the overall impression by the act. In addition, no member of a national jury could be related in any way to any of the competing acts in such a way that they cannot vote impartially and independently.

Following the release of the full split voting by the EBU after the conclusion of the competition, it was revealed that Switzerland had placed fifth with the public televote and sixteenth with the jury vote in the second semi-final. In the public vote, Switzerland received an average rank of 7.00, while with the jury vote, Switzerland received an average rank of 10.65.

Below is a breakdown of points awarded to Switzerland and awarded by Switzerland in the second semi-final and grand final of the contest. The nation awarded its 12 points to Hungary in the semi-final and to Italy in the final of the contest.

==== Points awarded to Switzerland ====
Points awarded to Switzerland (Semi-final 2)
| Score | Country |
|---|---|
| 12 points | |
| 10 points | France |
| 8 points | |
| 7 points | |
| 6 points | Finland; Hungary |
| 5 points | Iceland |
| 4 points | |
| 3 points | Greece; Norway |
| 2 points | Albania; Armenia; Malta |
| 1 point | Bulgaria; Germany |

==== Points awarded by Switzerland ====
Points awarded by Switzerland (Semi-final 2)
| Score | Country |
|---|---|
| 12 points | Hungary |
| 10 points | Iceland |
| 8 points | Norway |
| 7 points | Malta |
| 6 points | Greece |
| 5 points | Albania |
| 4 points | Macedonia |
| 3 points | Azerbaijan |
| 2 points | Finland |
| 1 point | Latvia |

Points awarded by Switzerland (Final)
| Score | Country |
|---|---|
| 12 points | Italy |
| 10 points | Hungary |
| 8 points | Greece |
| 7 points | Norway |
| 6 points | Azerbaijan |
| 5 points | Iceland |
| 4 points | Netherlands |
| 3 points | Denmark |
| 2 points | United Kingdom |
| 1 point | Germany |
