= Code 5 (band) =

Swiss boy band

- Origin: Zürich, Switzerland
- Genres: Dance, pop
- Years active: 1997–1998
- Labels: (Switzerland) Artist Records (Canada) Maxmusic
- Past members: Damian Meier; Jason Meloche; Michel Bognar; Erkan Yaggi ("EJ"); Igor Marasco; Bernhard Attinger ("Beny")

Code 5 was a Swiss boy band. They enjoyed moderate success in Switzerland with the top-ten hit "Love Is Your Game" and in Canada with their rendition of Carol Medina's song "And the Song Goes (Doo Dit)".

== History ==
=== 1997: Formation and first single ===
Code 5 was formed by Artist Records manager Stephan Brunner. The members were chosen from a group of 300 people that attended the casting advertised in the Blick newspaper. The band was officially introduced on a press conference in late March 1997, and their first single "Love Is Your Game" debuted on the Swiss singles chart two months later at #9, and maintained the spot for two weeks, becoming their most successful release. The follow-up single, "Hold Me Now", was not as popular and after four weeks on the chart it peaked at #42.

On 27 August 1997 Code 5 performed as an opening act for the Backstreet Boys on their Live in Concert Tour stop in Winterthur.

Damian Meier, who acted both as the lead singer and vocal coach for the band, left the band in November to pursue a solo career, and had been replaced with Canadian Jason Meloche. He debuted with Code 5 on their "I'll Be There For You" single and appeared in the music video. The third single reached No. 27 on Swiss Hitparade.

=== 1998: Album release and breakup ===
In March 1998 the band left for Canada to record songs for their debut album "Premium". Their fourth single, "And The Song Goes (Doo Dit)", debuted on Canadian RPM Weekly Chart in early May at #97, and reached #24 in mid-August. It turned out to be their last single - despite massive support from the tabloid press, sponsors backed out from the project due to poor sales and negative comments from other media outlets, leaving both the record company (Stephan Brunner allegedly invested 500.000 Swiss francs in the band) and group members with financial problems. Amidst growing tensions, Meloche and Marasco left Code 5 in October. By the time "Premium" album was released, the group was disbanded. While Damian Meier is still a performing artist, other group members pursued other interests.

== Members ==
- Damian Meier (March 1997-November 1997)
- Jason Meloche (November 1997-October 1998)
- Erkan "EJ" Yaggi (1997–1998)
- Michel Bognar (1997–1998)
- Igor Marasco (1997–1998)
- Bernhard "Beny" Attinger (1997–1998)

== Discography ==
=== Singles ===
Year	Single	Peak positions	
Year	Single	(Switzerland) SWI	(Canada) CAN
1997	"Love Is Your Game"	9	—
1997	"Hold Me Now"	42	—
1997	"I'll Be There For You"	27	—
1998	"And The Song Goes (Doo Dit)"	—	24
"—" denotes releases that did not chart or were not released.

=== Albums ===
Year	Title	Chart Position
Year	Title	(Switzerland) SWI
1998	Premium	—
