= Mélanie René =

Swiss singer and songwriter (born 1990)

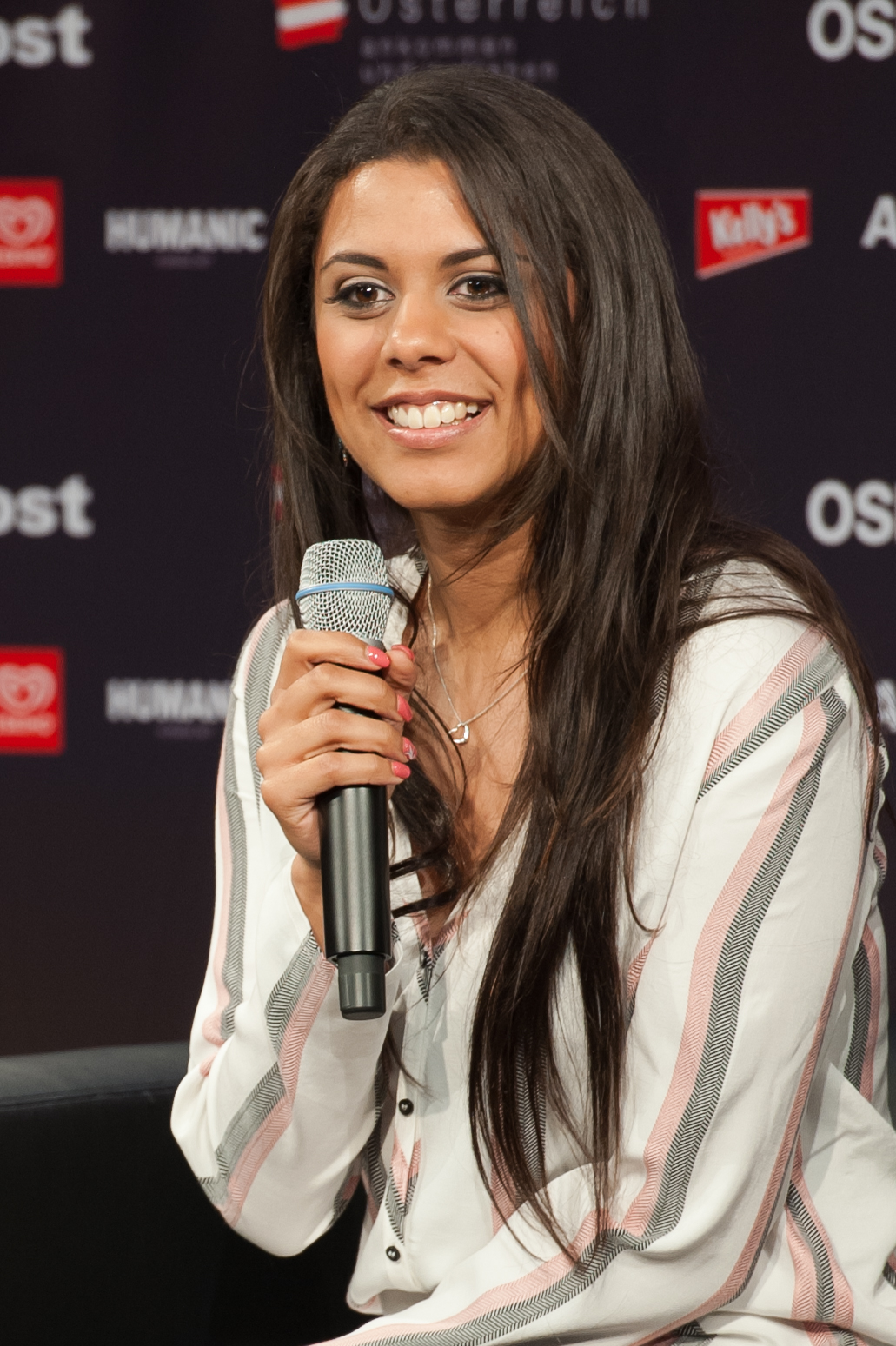
- René in 2015

Background information
- Also known as: Meylz
- Born: 1 September 1990 (age 35); Geneva, Switzerland
- Genres: Pop
- Occupations: Singer, songwriter
- Instrument: Vocals

Mélanie René (born 1 September 1990), also known as Meylz, is a Swiss singer and songwriter. She represented Switzerland in the Eurovision Song Contest 2015 with the song "Time to Shine".

René is of Mauritian origin.

René gained recognition by winning the Swiss final for the 2015 Eurovision Song Contest with her composition "Time To Shine," and went on to represent Switzerland in Vienna. She trained in performing arts and songwriting at the Funambule Theatre in Nyon, Switzerland. René participated in competitions including the George Grigoriu Festival in Braila, Romania, where she received the grand prize in 2009.

She studied at the ACM (Academy of Contemporary Music) and the BIMM (Brighton Institute of Modern Music) in the United Kingdom, where she composed her Eurovision Song Contest entry.

== Singles ==
Single	Year	Peak positions	Album
Single	Year	SWI	Album
"Time to Shine"	2015	73	Non album single(s)
"On avait rêvé"	2015	—	Non album single(s)

== See also ==
- Switzerland in the Eurovision Song Contest 2015

Awards and achievements
Preceded by Sebalter with "Hunter of Stars"	Switzerland in the Eurovision Song Contest; 2015	Succeeded by Rykka with"The Last of Our Kind"
