= Day of Glory =

Studio album by Sebalter
- Released: 9 January 2015
- Recorded: 2013–14
- Genre: Pop
- Label: Phonag Records
- Producer: Sebastiano Paù-Lessi

Sebalter chronology
Day of Glory (2015)	Awakening (2017)

Singles from Day of Glory
- 1. "Hunter of Stars" Released: 2 December 2013; 2. "Saturday" Released: 18 July 2014

Day of Glory is the debut studio album by Swiss singer and fiddle player Sebalter. It was released in Switzerland on 9 January 2015, through Phonag Records. The album has peaked to number 9 on the Swiss Albums Chart. The album includes the singles "Hunter of Stars" and "Saturday".

== Singles ==
"Hunter of Stars" was released as the lead single from the album on 2 December 2013. The song has peaked to number 6 in Switzerland. The song was selected to represent Switzerland at the Eurovision Song Contest 2014 at the B&W Hallerne in Copenhagen, Denmark. During the semi-final allocation draw on 20 January 2014 at the Copenhagen City Hall, Switzerland was drawn to compete in the second half of the second semi-final on 8 May 2014. Switzerland qualified from the second semi-final and competed in the final on 10 May 2014. At the end of voting, Switzerland finished 13th overall with 64 points, marking the country's best placing in the final since 2005. It was later revealed that Switzerland finished 4th in the second semi-final, the best placing for a Swiss participant in the semi-final era. "Saturday" was released as the second single from the album on 18 July 2014.

== Track listing ==
Standard listing
No.	Title	Writer(s)	Producer(s)	Length
1.	"Shadows"	Sebastiano Paù-Lessi	Sebastiano Paù-Lessi	2:47
2.	"September"	Paù-Lessi	Paù-Lessi	4:08
3.	"Day of Glory"	Paù-Lessi	Paù-Lessi	3:00
4.	"Sweet Melancholy"	Paù-Lessi	Paù-Lessi	3:55
5.	"Hunter of Stars"	Paù-Lessi	Paù-Lessi	3:04
6.	"Sleepless Nights"	Paù-Lessi	Paù-Lessi	4:02
7.	"Clouds"	Paù-Lessi	Paù-Lessi	3:32
8.	"Saturday"	Paù-Lessi	Paù-Lessi	3:08
9.	"Nostalgia"	Paù-Lessi	Paù-Lessi	2:32
10.	"Songs of Serenity"	Paù-Lessi	Paù-Lessi	4:07
11.	"Not Every Picture Means Goodbye"	Paù-Lessi	Paù-Lessi	4:07

== Chart performance ==
=== Weekly charts ===
Chart (2015)	Peak position
Swiss Albums (Schweizer Hitparade)	9

== Release history ==
Region	Release date	Format	Label
Switzerland	9 January 2015	Digital Download, CD	Phonag Records
