= Sebalter =

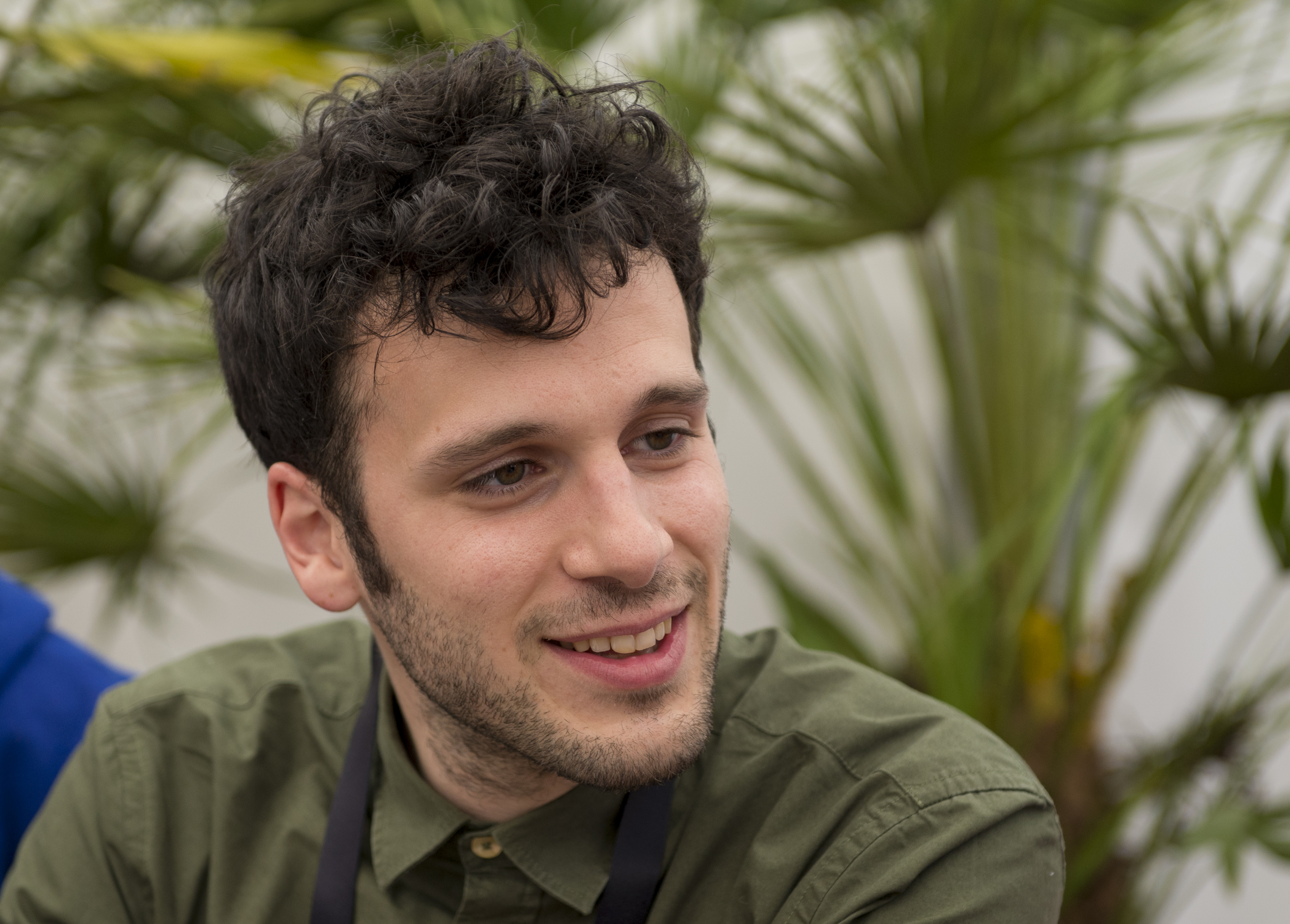
- Sebalter (2014)

Background information
- Born: Sebastiano Paù-Lessi; 1 July 1985 (age 40); Giubiasco, Ticino, Switzerland
- Genres: Pop folk
- Occupations: Singer, fiddle player, songwriter, attorney
- Years active: 2002–present
- Labels: Phonag Records

Sebastiano Paù-Lessi, (born 1 July 1985) better known by his stage name Sebalter (stylised SEBalter) is a Swiss singer, fiddler, and attorney who represented his country at the Eurovision Song Contest 2014 in Copenhagen, Denmark. He performed the song "Hunter of Stars" in the final on 10 May 2014, finishing 13th with 64 points. Sebalter was born in the Italian-speaking canton of Ticino. Prior to Eurovision he worked as a business lawyer, putting his law career on hold to focus on his music career.

== Music career ==
=== 2000–2012: Early career ===
From 2000 to 2002, Sebalter played bass in a Swiss hard rock band called The Stalkers, who specialised in covers of early '70s groups, such as Uriah Heep, Deep Purple and Led Zeppelin. From 2002 to 2012, Sebalter played the fiddle in a Swiss folk rock band The Vad Vuc, where he released three albums with the band and toured extensively. He left the band in 2012 to pursue a solo career. In 2005, while he was studying at university, Sebastiano co-presented the youth television series Le vostre vacanze (Your Holiday) on Swiss channel TSI and two New Year specials in 2006 and 2007.

=== 2013–15: Eurovision Song Contest 2014 and Day of Glory ===
In November 2013, "Hunter of Stars" was announced as one of the three entries from Italian Swiss broadcaster RSI for the Swiss national selection. Later in the month the song passed the Expert Check stage, progressing to the national final. In December the song was released as a single. Sebalter and his band performed "Hunter of Stars" on the national final show Die Große Entscheidungsshow on 1 February, winning the selection. At the Eurovision Song Contest 2014 in Copenhagen, Denmark, he performed "Hunter of Stars" during the second semi-final on 8 May 2014 and qualified for the grand final on 10 May 2014. He finished 13th with 64 points, Switzerland's best result since 2005. In July 2014 he released the single "Saturday". In January 2015 he released his debut studio album Day of Glory, which includes the singles "Hunter of Stars" and "Saturday". The album peaked at number 9 on the Swiss Albums Chart. In 2015, he retired from music to continue working as a lawyer. Despite his intentions and announcements, he still tours around Switzerland and Italy with guitarist Mattia Bordignon and banjo player Rocco Casella.

=== 2016–present: Awakening ===
He presented the Swiss jury vote during the final of the Eurovision Song Contest 2016 in Stockholm. His second studio album, entitled Awakening, was released on 20 January 2017. In 2017, he performed his song "Weeping Willow" on ESC 2017 – Die Entscheidungsshow. He has been a commentator during the grand final for the Swiss-Italian broadcaster RSI along with Clarissa Tami since the 2017 contest.

In 2018, it was announced that Sebalter would be making an attempt to return to Eurovision, competing for the chance to represent Switzerland in the 2019 contest with the song, "Carry the Light". In 2019, SRF revealed that they had chosen Luca Hänni as their representative.

== Discography ==
=== Albums ===
Title	Details	Peak chart positions
Title	Details	SWI
Day of Glory	Released: 9 January 2015; Label: Phonag Records; Format: Digital download, CD	9
Awakening	Released: 20 January 2017; Label: Phonag Records; Format: Digital download, CD	9
Gente simpatica	Released: 13 March 2020; Label: Phonag Records; Format: Digital download, CD	—
"—" denotes a recording that did not chart or was not released in that territory.

=== Singles ===
Title	Year	Peak chart positions						Album
Title	Year	SWI	AUT	GER	IRE	NL	UK	Album
"Hunter of Stars"	2013	6	48	77	49	98	85	Day of Glory
"Saturday"	2014	—	—	—	—	—	—	Day of Glory
"Weeping Willow"	2017	—	—	—	—	—	—	Awakening
"Gente simpatica"	2020	—	—	—	—	—	—	Gente simpatica
"La Fine dell'Estate"	2020	—	—	—	—	—	—	Gente simpatica
"—" denotes a recording that did not chart or was not released in that territory.

=== With The Vad Vuc ===
- Il monastero dei folli (2004)
- Trans Roonkaya Express (2006)
- La parata dei secondi (2009)

Awards and achievements
Preceded by Takasa with "You and Me"	Switzerland in the Eurovision Song Contest; 2014	Succeeded by Mélanie René with "Time to Shine"
