= Awakening (Sebalter album) =

Studio album by Sebalter
- Released: 20 January 2017
- Recorded: 2016
- Genre: Pop
- Label: Phonag Records
- Producer: Sebastiano Paù-Lessi

Sebalter chronology
Day of Glory (2015)	Awakening (2017)	Gente simpatica (2020)

Singles from Awakening
- 1. "Weeping Willow" Released: 2017

Awakening is the second studio album by Swiss singer and fiddle player Sebalter. It was released in Switzerland on 20 January 2017 by Phonag Records. The album has peaked to number 9 on the Swiss Albums Chart. The album includes the single "Weeping Willow".

== Singles ==
"Weeping Willow" was released as the lead single from the album. He performed the song on ESC 2017 – Die Entscheidungsshow.

== Track listing ==
Standard listing
No.	Title	Writer(s)	Producer(s)	Length
1.	"Awakening"	Sebastiano Paù-Lessi	Sebastiano Paù-Lessi	3:50
2.	"Butterfly"	Paù-Lessi	Paù-Lessi	4:08
3.	"Weeping Willow"	Paù-Lessi; Rocco Casella	Paù-Lessi	2:52
4.	"Better Not"	Paù-Lessi	Paù-Lessi	3:14
5.	"First Night"	Paù-Lessi	Paù-Lessi	3:32
6.	"Northern Light Dance"	Paù-Lessi	Paù-Lessi	4:32
7.	"Lights"	Paù-Lessi	Paù-Lessi	3:24
8.	"Hollywood"	Paù-Lessi	Paù-Lessi	2:48
9.	"Time"	Paù-Lessi	Paù-Lessi	3:47
10.	"Vancouver"	Paù-Lessi	Paù-Lessi	3:05

== Chart performance ==
=== Weekly charts ===
Chart (2017)	Peak position
Swiss Albums (Schweizer Hitparade)	9

== Release history ==
Region	Release date	Format	Label
Switzerland	20 January 2017	Digital Download, CD	Phonag Records
