= Takasa =

Swiss band of Salvation Army soldiers

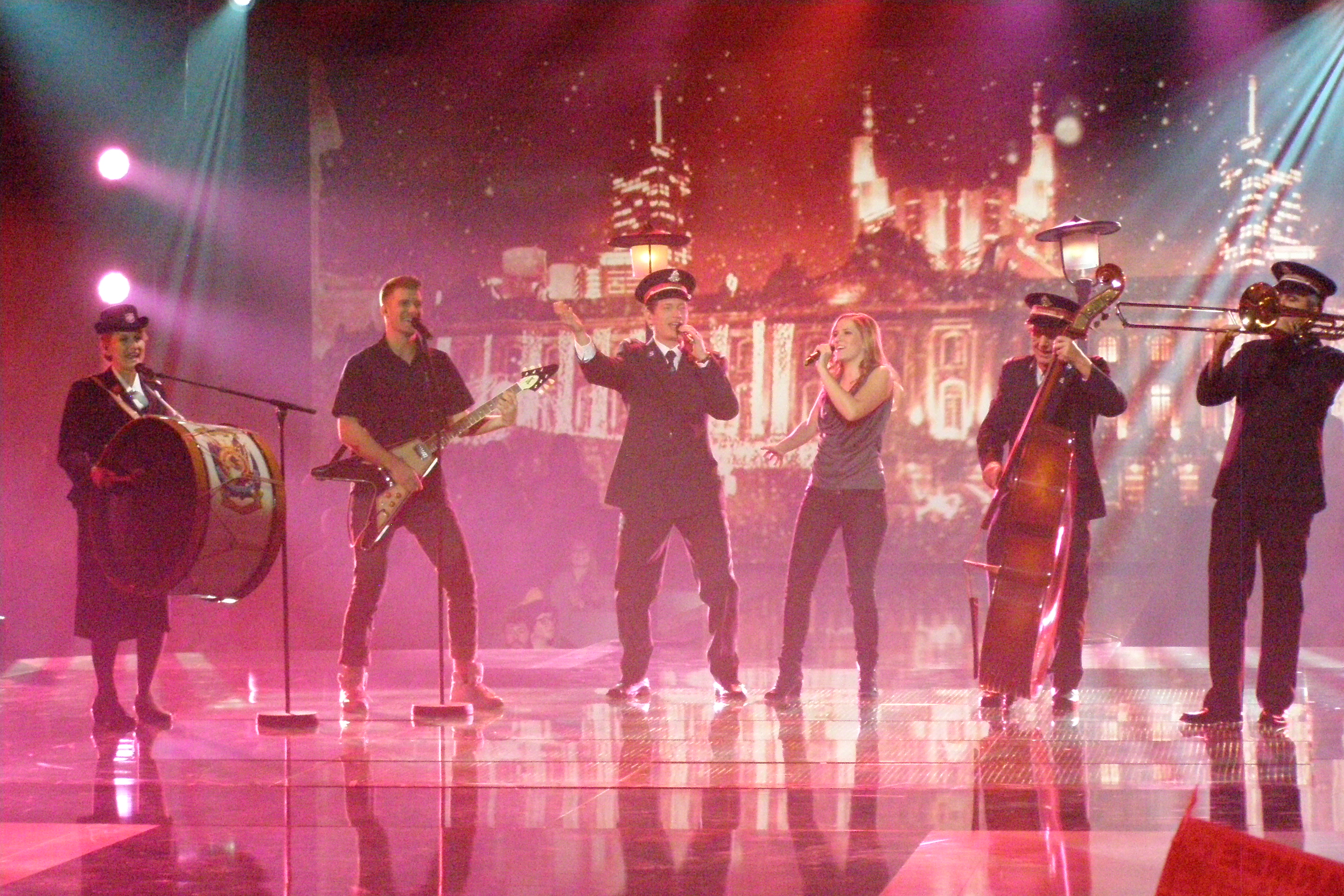
- From left to right: Hauri, Gygax, Jakob, Breiter, Ramsauer and Sterckx

Background information
- Also known as: Heilsarmee
- Origin: Switzerland
- Years active: 2012–2013
- Label: HitMill Records
- Members: Sarah Breiter; Jonas Gygax; Katharina Hauri; Christoph Jakob; Emil Ramsauer (deceased); Michel Sterckx

Takasa (formerly Heilsarmee) was a Swiss musical group that represented Switzerland in the Eurovision Song Contest 2013 in Malmö, Sweden. The group consisted of six Salvation Army soldiers.

== Career ==
=== Eurovision Song Contest 2013 ===
The band participated in the Swiss national final with the song "You and Me". They qualified to the national final through the online selection organized by SF. On 15 December 2012, they won the Swiss national final, therefore they represented Switzerland in the Eurovision Song Contest 2013.

On 17 December 2012, the European Broadcasting Union (EBU) announced that the band would not be permitted to compete under the name "Heilsarmee" (German for "Salvation Army") at the Eurovision Song Contest, in accordance with the rules of the contest forbidding political and religious content. In March 2013, the group announced that they would be known as "Takasa" for the contest; officially, the name was taken from the Swahili verb "to purify", but it has been noted to be an acronym of "The Artists Known As Salvation Army" (an allusion to The Artist Formerly Known As Prince).

The members of the band have a major age difference, as the oldest member, bassist Emil Ramsauer, was 95 (born 1918), and their youngest member, singer Sarah Breiter, was 22 (born 1991), at the time of their Eurovision performance. The band also wore different outfits for Eurovision, barred from wearing Salvation Army uniforms by the same rules.

=== Subsequent career and dissolution ===
After their Eurovision appearance, the group performed only a few more times at local events in Switzerland. By 2015, according to Christoph Jakob, the group had ceased to exist, because the other professional responsibilities of its members made its continuance impractical.

In 2018, Ramsauer became the first Eurovision artist to turn 100 years of age. Ramsauer's death was announced on 22 December 2021, at the age of 103.

== Discography ==
=== Singles ===
Title	Year	Chart positions	Album
Title	Year	SWI	Album
"You and Me"	2012	21	TBA

Preceded by Sinplus with "Unbreakable"	Switzerland in the Eurovision Song Contest; 2013	Succeeded by Sebalter with "Hunter of Stars"
