= Rykka =

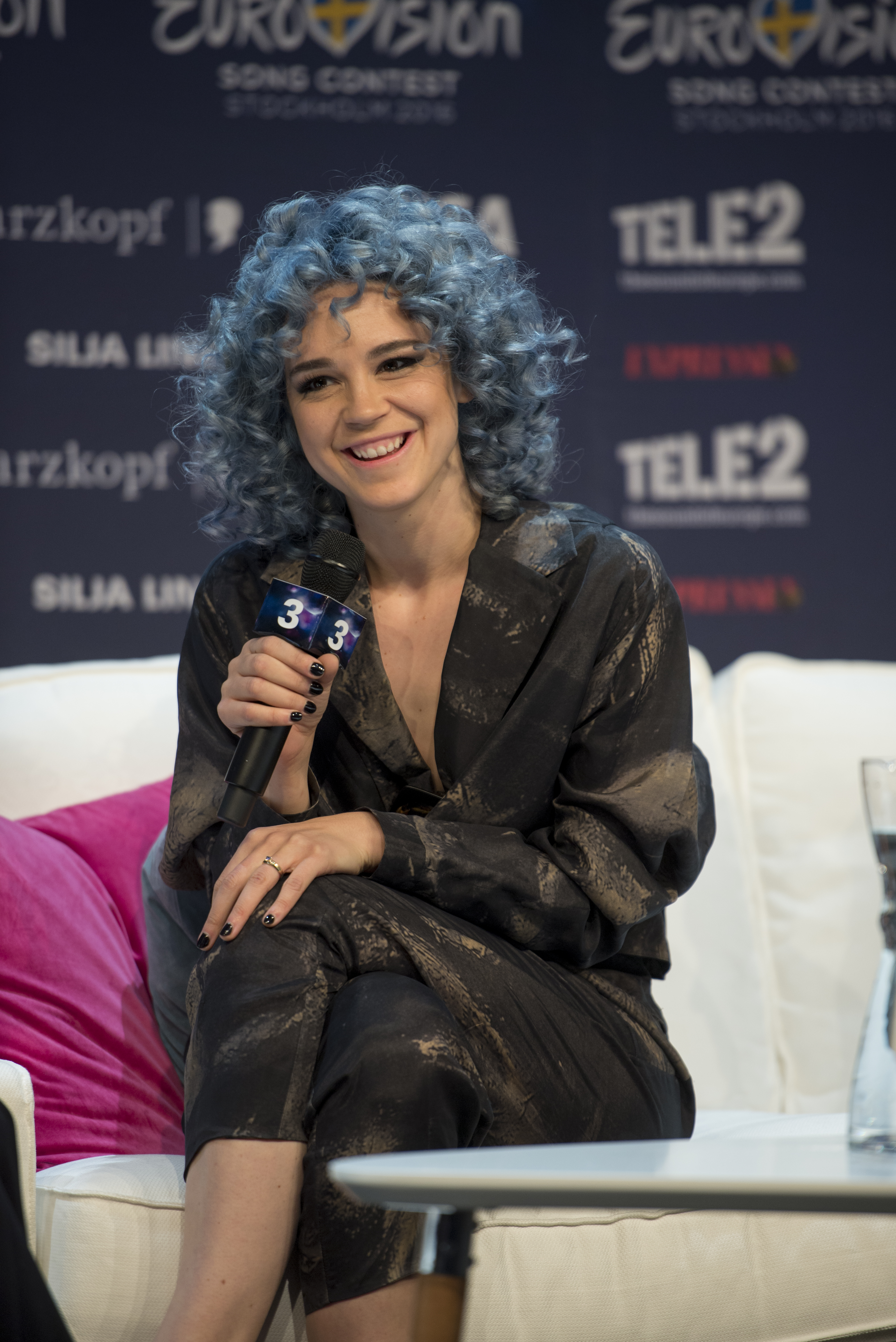
- Rykka in 2016

Background information
- Born: Christina Maria Rieder; 13 March 1986 (age 40); Vancouver, British Columbia, Canada
- Origin: Switzerland
- Genres: Alternative rock; indie pop
- Occupations: Singer; songwriter
- Years active: 2000–present
- Labels: Little Jig Records; Vissen Records; Cordova Bay Records
- Website: www.rykka.com

Christina Maria Rieder (born 13 March 1986), better known by their stage name Rykka (/ˈraɪkə/), is a Swiss-Canadian singer and songwriter from Vancouver, British Columbia, whose songs have been featured on TV, and who has been nominated for several music awards both in British Columbia, and across Canada. On May 12, 2016, Rykka represented Switzerland in the Eurovision Song Contest 2016 in Stockholm with the song "The Last of Our Kind", performing in the second semi-final of the event.

== Life and career ==
=== Early years ===
Rykka was born Christina Maria Rieder in Vancouver, British Columbia, Canada. Christina began guitar lessons at age 15, then performed at local community festivals. During their two-year program at Vancouver Community College, Christina studied voice with Paula Kremer, while also busking around Vancouver's Granville Island.

In 2009, Christina moved to Toronto to record their third independent album Straight Line under the performing name "Christina Maria". The album was produced with the help of several Canadian producers such as David Baxter, Russel Broom, and Ryan Guldemond of Mother Mother.

In 2010, Christina's album Straight Line was released in Switzerland under Little Jig Records. Rykka stayed and performed both in Switzerland and in Germany, highlighted by a performance on "Sat.1 Frühstücksfernsehen"; a German television channel boasting an average audience of 1 million viewers. Christina later received a nomination for Demotape Clinic at M4Music in Switzerland.

=== 2012–2013: Kodiak ===
Christina released an album Kodiak in 2012. It marked a significant change in their musical career, since Christina formally changed their stage name from Christina Maria to Rykka. The record was produced by Ryan Guldemond of Mother Mother, engineered by Shawn Penner, mixed by Warne Livesey and mastered by Andy VanDette. It was released that year in Switzerland by Little Jig Records.

=== 2013–present: Other work ===
In 2013, Rykka released their fourth studio album Kodiak under Vissen Record in Canada, following a release of the same album in Switzerland the year before. Later in 2013, Rykka won $100,000.00 in BC's Peak Performance Project.

Rykka played a slot in BC's well-known Squamish Valley Music Festival (2014), opening for another Peak Performance Project winner, We Are the City. Rykka represented Switzerland in the Eurovision Song Contest 2016 with the song "The Last of Our Kind" (written by Rykka, Jeff Dawson, Mike James, and Warne Livesey) after winning ESC 2016 – Die Entscheidungsshow. Rykka placed 18th (last) in the second semifinal of Eurovision 2016, scoring 28 points.

== Personal life ==
Rykka splits their time between Zürich in Switzerland and their hometown of Vancouver. Rykka cites Heart, Blondie, Madonna, Björk, Cyndi Lauper, Kate Bush, and Pat Benatar as their main influences. Rykka's paternal grandfather is Swiss. Their maternal ancestry is Dutch; their maternal grandfather comes from Bodegraven and their maternal grandmother is from Woerden.

Rykka came out as non-binary and uses they/them pronouns.

== Discography ==
=== Studio albums ===
| Title | Details |
|---|---|
| Kodiak | Released: October 26, 2012; Label: Little Jig Records; Format: Digital download |
| Beatitudes | Released: November 4, 2016; Label: Cordova Bay Records; Format: Digital download |

=== Singles ===
==== As lead artist ====
| Title | Year | Album |
|---|---|---|
| "Map Inside" | 2012 | Kodiak |
| "The Brink" | 2012 | Kodiak |
| "Blackie" | 2013 | Kodiak |
| "Electric" | 2014 | Kodiak |
| "Movies" | 2015 | Beatitudes |
| "The Last of Our Kind" | 2016 | Beatitudes |
| "Bad Boy" | 2016 | Beatitudes |
| "Youth is Wasted" | 2017 | Beatitudes |

==== As featured artist ====
| Title | Year | Album |
|---|---|---|
| "Never Fade" (Alex Guesta featuring Rykka) | 2014 | Non-album singles |
| "The Devil" (The New Black Tea featuring Rykka) | 2014 | Non-album singles |
| "Dolls" (The New Black Tea featuring Rykka) | 2014 | Non-album singles |
| "Delirium" (Zomboy featuring Rykka) | 2014 | The Outbreak |
| "Aurora" (Delerium featuring Rykka) | 2015 | Rarities & B-Sides |
| "Don't You Honey Me" (Timothy Jaromir featuring Rykka) | 2015 | Non-album singles |
| "Thunder" (Matierro & Dynastrax featuring Rykka) | 2015 | Non-album singles |
| "With or Without" (Tommy Mangano featuring Rykka) | 2016 | Non-album singles |
| "Toes" (Frank Walker featuring Rykka) | 2016 | Non-album singles |
| "Rebels" (Esh featuring Rykka) | 2016 | Non-album singles |
| "Escape" (Armando Vico featuring Rykka) | 2016 | Non-album singles |
| "The Hardest Part" (Ørjan Nilsen featuring Rykka) | 2017 | Non-album singles |

== Filmography ==
- Blackie was featured on TV series Rookie Blue (S04E07)
- The Brink was featured on TV series "Tessa & Scott" (S01E03)

== Awards and nominations ==
- Kodiak nominated for Spiritual Album of the Year (Western Canadian Music Awards) (2014)
- Map Inside won Best of BC (Shore 104 Radio Station) (2013)
- Rykka wins The Peak Performance Project (2013)

Awards and achievements
| Preceded by Mélanie René with "Time to Shine" | Switzerland in the Eurovision Song Contest; 2016 | Succeeded by Timebelle with "Apollo" |
