= In Harmony (film) =

2015 French drama film

- Theatrical release poster
- French: En équilibre
- Directed by: Denis Dercourt
- Screenplay by: Denis Dercourt
- Based on: Sur mes quatre jambes by Bernard Sachsé and Véronique Pellerin
- Produced by: Éric Altmayer; Nicolas Altmayer; Isabelle Grellat
- Starring: Albert Dupontel; Cécile De France; Patrick Mille; Marie Bäumer
- Cinematography: Julien Hirsch
- Edited by: Pauline Gaillard
- Music by: Jérôme Lemonnier
- Production companies: Mandarin Cinéma; StudioCanal; Cinéfrance 1888; France 3 Cinéma
- Distributed by: StudioCanal
- Release date: 15 April 2015
- Running time: 87 minutes
- Country: France
- Language: French
- Budget: $7.6 million
- Box office: $4 million

In Harmony (French: En équilibre, pronounced [ɑ̃.n‿ekilibʁ]) is a 2015 French drama film written and directed by Denis Dercourt, adapted from the book Sur mes quatre jambes by Bernard Sachsé and Véronique Pellerin. The film stars Albert Dupontel and Cécile De France.

== Plot ==
Marc Guermont is a horse trainer and stuntman in the Loire region of France. During a film production, an unrestrained dog scares his horse, which throws him and breaks his back, rendering him a wheelchair-using paraplegic. Florence Kernel, an insurance loss adjuster, visits him at his rambling property and stables, where he lives alone, aided by Antoine. She tries to convince him to sign documents to obtain a €300,000 payout. He refuses, sensing his claim could be worth much more. He is correct: the loss adjusters receive a video of the accident and know he could win in a court case.

On a second visit, he scares and exhilarates her driving his specially adapted truck. The ethics of Florence's employer are called into question when her boss asks her to get his signature as soon as possible, using any approach. She returns, casually dressed and tries to befriend Marc, offering him a CD of music he had playing on the last visit. She reveals she was once a pianist, but quit after failing a crucial exam. He convinces her to ride his horse - initially terrified, she soon loves the experience.

Home with her husband and two children, she begins to experience doubts about her life and relationship, thinking fondly of Marc. Marc meanwhile tries to mount his horse using a knotted rope and upper body strength, but panics and is knocked unconscious and taken to hospital. In a dream scene, he is seen stunt-riding a white horse along a beach. He makes a recovery and mounts his horse again, with more success and an adapted saddle.

Later, Marc buys and ATV from a dealership where the salesman mentions he is Florence's husband.

Eventually relieved of handling Marc's insurance case by her boss, Florence pities Marc, while developing feelings for him and illegally passes him the business card of a friend, a top lawyer, who could help him. The lawyer puts Marc on course to receive a large insurance payout, but wants taped evidence of his conversations with the insurance company to strengthen her case. Marc invites Florence on a date unsuccessfully, also asking if she has taped their conversations. She eventually tries to pass him a voice-recording where she is heard to pressure him into accepting the inferior insurance deal. Marc refuses to accept it, knowing she will be fired if it is heard in court. Florence, plagued with guilt and attracted to Marc, wakes up before dusk and enters Marc's house, leaving the voice recorder. Drawn to Marc sleeping, she approaches him. He reaches for her and they kiss and (off camera) have sex, unconstrained by his paralysis. They also spend the morning together in a speedboat and by a lake in the Loire region. They are not shown together after this.

Florence eventually mails the recorder directly to the lawyer, who uses it to (off camera) help secure Marc's compensation claim in court. Florence is fired for her actions, rekindles her love of classical piano (including taking an exam) and takes a job in the local public library. She is in her house with her daughter when the TV shows Marc competing in a dressage event, confident on his horse, Othello. Florence weeps openly. Marc is seen driving home from the competition with a horsebox. Cut to ending, leaving the question of their relationship unresolved.

== Cast ==
- Albert Dupontel as Marc Guermont
- Cécile de France as Florence Kernel
- Patrick Mille as Julien Kernel
- Marie Bäumer as Alexandra
- Carole Franck as The Counsel
- Laure Calamy as Séverine
- Alexis Loret as Séverine's husband
- Joseph Malerba as Victor
- Vincent Furic as Nicolas
- Mélanie Malhère as Mélanie
- Antonin Gabrielli as Antoine
- Bruno Monsaingeon as The piano teacher

== Reception ==
On review aggregator Rotten Tomatoes, the film holds an approval rating of 100%, based on 5 reviews with an average rating of 7/10.

The Guardian awarded it three stars, saying "...this is about as bourgeois and Gallic as a film can be without actually dressing the characters in Breton shirts and draping ropes of onions around their necks, but the actors are undeniably magnetic, the stunt work is duly impressive and it all trots along at manageable pace. Plus, there's some great equine acting on hand from Othello, the supporting stallion, a chestnut beauty with eyes almost as soulful as Dupontel's own."

== See also ==
- List of films about horses
