= Sinplus =

Swiss alternative rock duo

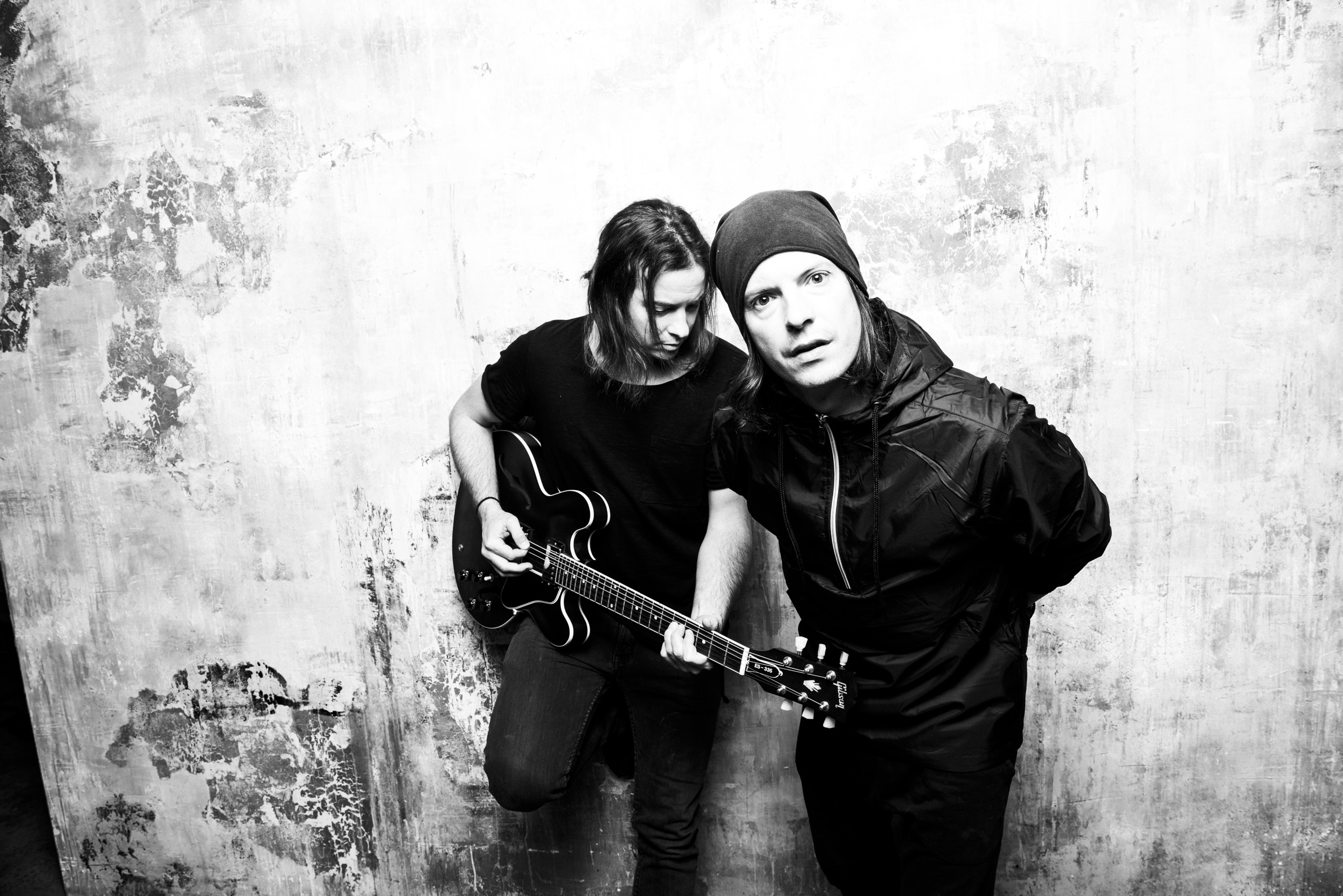

Background information
- Origin: Locarno, Switzerland
- Genres: Alternative rock, post-punk, new wave
- Years active: 2009-present
- Label: Dream Loud Entertainment LTD
- Members: Ivan Broggini (guitar); Gabriel Broggini (vocals)
- Website: sinplus.com

Sinplus is an alternative rock duo made up of brothers Ivan and Gabriel Broggini originally from Locarno, Switzerland.

== Music career ==
Sinplus was formed in 2009 by brothers Ivan Broggini (guitar) and Gabriel Broggini (vocals). Inspired by their shared passion for music, they began writing and performing together, crafting a sound that blends raw energy with melodic hooks. Their name reflects their philosophy of embracing imperfection and striving for authenticity in their art.

In 2012, Sinplus represented Switzerland in the Eurovision Song Contest in Baku, Azerbaijan with the song "Unbreakable". The performance brought international exposure and marked an important milestone in their early career.

Following Eurovision, Sinplus’s early releases gained traction within Switzerland and led to opportunities to expand their audience across Europe.

== Critical acclaim and artistic evolution ==
In 2014, Sinplus received the MTV award as Best Swiss Act. They also earned a nomination for Best European Act.

With their sophomore albums Up to Me (2014) and This Is What We Are (2017), Sinplus began experimenting with broader influences, incorporating electronic textures and more refined production.

Their subsequent release, Break the Rules (2021).

== Musical style ==
Sinplus’s music is characterized by powerful guitar riffs, driving rhythms, and emotionally charged vocals, with influences drawn from bands such as U2, The Killers, and The Black Keys.

== Live performances and touring ==
Sinplus is known for their live performances, having appeared at prominent events such as the Isle of Wight and Moon & Stars. Their tours have spanned Europe, with shows ranging from club gigs to festival audiences. Sharing stages with acts like Roxette, Europe, The Darkness and Mando Diao.

== Studio albums ==
- Disinformation (2012)
- Up to Me (2014)
- This Is What We Are (2017)
- Break the Rules (2021)

== EPs ==
- It’s Not About Being Good (2020)

== Notable singles ==
- "Unbreakable" (2011)
- "Phoenix from the Ashes" (2013)
- "Love Is Free" featuring Lady Chann (2014)
- “You and I (ft. Mickey Shiloh) (2017)
- “Escape” (2020)
- “Private Show (my RnR)” (2021)
- "Wildflower" (2022)
- “Don’t Come Any Closer” (2023)
- “Let It Go” (2024)
- "Bad Song" (2024)
- "Faster Than Shadows" (2025)
- "A Tear Going Lonely" (2025)
- "Unnatural Disaster" (2025)
- "Crossfire" (2025)
- "Who's To Say" (2025)

== Awards ==
Year	Award	Category	Result
2014	MTV Europe Music Awards	Best Swiss Act	Won
2014	MTV Europe Music Awards	Best Central European Act	Nominated

Preceded by Anna Rossinelli with "In Love for a While"	Switzerland in the Eurovision Song Contest; 2012	Succeeded by Takasa with "You and Me"
