= Hunter of Stars =

2013 song by Sebalter

Single by Sebalter

from the album Day of Glory
- Released: December 2, 2013
- Genre: Folk rock, indie folk
- Length: 2:59
- Songwriter(s): Sebastiano Paù-Lessi

Sebalter singles chronology
"Hunter of Stars" (2013)	"Saturday" (2014)

Music video
- "Hunter of Stars" on YouTube

Eurovision Song Contest 2014 entry
- Country: Switzerland
- Artist(s): Sebalter
- Language: English
- Composer(s): Sebastiano Paù-Lessi
- Lyricist(s): Sebastiano Paù-Lessi

Finals performance
- Semi-final result: 4th
- Semi-final points: 92
- Final result: 13th
- Final points: 64

Entry chronology
- ◄ "You and Me" (2013)
- "Time to Shine" (2015) ►

Song presentation
- file; help

Official performance video
- "Hunter of Stars" (Final) on YouTube

"Hunter of Stars" is a song by Swiss singer Sebalter. It represented Switzerland at the Eurovision Song Contest 2014 in Denmark. The song was released in Switzerland as a digital download on December 2, 2013, as the lead single from his debut studio album Day of Glory (2015).

== Background ==
The song is inspired from a trip Sebastiano had made through Kansas City, Missouri, and Denver. The song is theorized as a song that speaks about a man who acts tough and strong, but on the inside, is wracked with self-confidence issues.

== Music video ==
The music video was directed by Nick Rusconi and was released on 17 March 2014. It was filmed at Hotel Royal Splendide in Lugano, Switzerland.

The video starts with two visitors entering a hotel where the hotel manager (Christian Frapolli), credited as "The Director" in the video) wants Sebalter to serve them. However, Sebalter just mucks around, which annoys the hotel manager. The next scene shows Sebalter and his band playing music in the kitchen while working. As the hotel manager walks in, Sebalter accidentally tosses the spaghetti all over him. Afterwards, the band moves the main lobby, again playing music but this time the hotel visitors are having fun with them. The video ends with the hotel manager eventually joining in as he whistles the final tunes, followed by the credits where "No Spaghetti were harmed during the production of this videoclip".

== Eurovision Song Contest ==
=== Die grosse Entscheidungs Show 2014 ===
Die grosse Entscheidungs Show 2014 was the fourth edition of the Swiss national final format that selected Switzerland's entry for the Eurovision Song Contest 2014. The national final was a collaboration between four broadcasters in Switzerland: the Swiss-German broadcaster Schweizer Radio und Fernsehen (SRF), the Swiss-French broadcaster Radio Télévision Suisse (RTS), the Swiss-Italian broadcaster Radiotelevisione svizzera (RSI) and the Swiss-Romansh broadcaster Radiotelevisiun Svizra Rumantscha (RTR).

"Hunter of Stars" was chosen by RSI. RSI opened a submission period between 21 July 2013 and 30 September 2013 for interested artists and composers to submit their entries. Seven candidates were to be selected to proceed to the RSI selection that would have been broadcast via radio on RSI Rete Tre from Lugano, however the broadcaster opted to suspend the selection and extend the submission deadline to 28 October 2013. Instead on 13 November 2013, a jury panel evaluated the 23 entry submissions received and selected the three candidates that proceeded to the "Expert Check". "Hunter of Stars" was able to pass the "Expert Check", becoming the only song to move onto the final for RSI.

The final took place on 1 February 2014. The show consisted of two parts: in the first part the six candidate songs in contention to represent Switzerland were performed and in the second part each artist performed a cover version of a song of their choice. For the cover, Sebalter would sing "Wake Me Up" by Avicii. The combination of televoting (50%) and the votes of an expert jury (50%) selected "Hunter of Stars" performed by Sebalter as the winner.

=== At Eurovision ===
During the semi-final allocation draw on 20 January 2014 at the Copenhagen City Hall, Switzerland was drawn to compete in the second half of the second semi-final on 8 May 2014. In the second semi-final, the producers of the show decided that Switzerland would perform 12th, following Macedonia and preceding Greece.

"Hunter of Stars" was able to qualify from the second semi-final, finishing in fourth with 92 points.

The song would then go on to compete in the second half of the final, eventually being selected to compete in the 20th position. In the final, "Hunter of Stars" would finish 13th, with 64 points.

== Track listing ==
Digital download
No.	Title	Length
1.	"Hunter of Stars"	2:59

== Charts ==
Chart (2014)	Peak position
Austria (Ö3 Austria Top 40)	48
Belgium (Ultratip Bubbling Under Flanders)	82
Germany (GfK)	77
Ireland (IRMA)	49
Netherlands (Single Top 100)	98
Switzerland (Schweizer Hitparade)	6
UK Singles (OCC)	85

== Release history ==
Region	Date	Format
Switzerland	December 2, 2013	Digital download

== See also ==
- Switzerland in the Eurovision Song Contest 2014
