= You and Me (Takasa song) =

2012 song recorded by Takasa

Single by Takasa
- Released: 14 December 2012
- Genre: Pop rock
- Length: 2:54
- Label: HitMill Records
- Songwriters: Georg Schlunegger, Roman Camenzind, Fred Herrmann
- Producer: Georg Schlunegger

Music video
- "You and Me" on YouTube

Eurovision Song Contest 2013 entry
- Country: Switzerland
- Artist: Takasa
- Language: English
- Composers: Georg Schlunegger; Roman Camenzind; Fred Herrmann
- Lyricists: Georg Schlunegger; Roman Camenzind; Fred Herrmann

Finals performance
- Semi-final result: 13th
- Semi-final points: 41
- Final result: {{{place}}}

Entry chronology
- ◄ "Unbreakable" (2012)
- "Hunter of Stars" (2014) ►

"You and Me" is a song recorded by Swiss group Takasa, a band composed of six members of the Swiss Salvation Army.

Written and produced by Georg Schlunegger for HitMill Records, the song competed in the Swiss national selection for the Eurovision Song Contest 2013, Die grosse Entscheidungs Show. After winning the selection organized by Schweizer Fernsehen, the German language division of the Swiss public broadcasting organization, on 15 December 2012 the song also won the national final, beating the remaining eight finalists.

The song's win has therefore qualified it to represent Switzerland at the 58th Annual Eurovision Song Contest in Malmö, Sweden. The band, known as Heilsarmee outside the contest, agreed to compete with a new name to gain acceptance by the contest, which does not allow any religious or political references in its entries or their songs. "You and Me" is a Pop Rock song with lyrics involving love and empowerment. It competed in the contest's second semi-final, which was held on 16 May.

== Background ==
In 2012, the Swiss Salvation Army started considering the idea to participate in the national selection of Eurovision Song Contest 2013. According to the project manager of the Salvation Army, Martin Künzi, competing in the Eurovision Song Contest was initially "just a crazy idea", but it was well received by many "enthusiastic supporters" within the Christian movement. The owner of the recording company HitMill, Roman Camenzinds, partnered with the Salvation Army to conduct the project. An internal casting was therefore held among the members of the Salvation Army, resulting in the selection of the six musicians of the band, named Heilsarmee. The members of the band — Emil Ramsauer, Michael Sterckx, Katharina Hauri, Christoph Jakob, Sarah Breiter, Jonas Gygax — are amateur musicians between 20 and 94 years old. Ramsauer at 94 is the oldest ever Eurovision contestant, beating the record set in previous year by Natalya Pugacheva, one of the members of the Russian band Buranovskiye Babushki.

In early October 2012, it was announced that, after recording the song, Heilsarmee had submitted it to the SF regional selection through the official website of the German-language Swiss television. On 12 November 2012 the song was admitted the national final, after a voting process combining internet televotes and points awarded by a jury of industry experts. On 15 December 2012, "You and Me" was therefore performed during Die grosse Entscheidungs Show. Heilsarmee's entry was the most voted song, thus beating the remaining eight contestants and being chosen to represent Switzerland in the Eurovision Song Contest 2013 in Malmö, Sweden.

The selection of the song received some criticisms by German entertainer and LGBT rights activist Hella von Sinnen. According to von Sinnen, since the Salvation Army is a strict Christian organization with conservative opinions about LGBT rights, this could represent an obstacle for Switzerland in the Eurovision Song Contest 2013, which has a strong gay and lesbian fanbase.

== Track list ==
- Digital download
1. "You and Me" – 2:54

== Personnel ==
- Takasa
  - Emil Ramsauer – double bass
  - Michael Sterckx – trombone
  - Katharina Hauri – drum, backing vocals
  - Christoph Jakob – lead vocals, electric guitar
  - Sarah Breiter – vocals
  - Jonas Gygax – electric guitar

== Chart performance ==
| Chart (2012) | Peak position |
|---|---|
| Switzerland (Schweizer Hitparade) | 21 |

== Release history ==
| Region | Date | Label | Format |
|---|---|---|---|
| Switzerland | 14 December 2012 | HitMill Records | Digital download |
| Germany | 14 December 2012 | HitMill Records | Digital download |
