= Phonag Records =

Record label

Phonag Records AG
- Founded: 1960
- Genre: Various
- Country of origin: Switzerland
- Location: Zurich
- Official website: phonag.ch

Phonag Records is a major record label in Switzerland based in Zurich, Switzerland. It was founded in 1960 as Phonag Schallplatten AG later renamed Records AG. In 2007, Phonag Records AG was taken over by TBA AG with Phonag remaining an independent marketing and rep company under this new ownership.

It is best known for the label Helvetia. Phonag also distributes Swiss national labels Gadget, Zytglogge, Turicaphon and many international record labels. It has exclusive contracts with a number of Swiss artists such as Francine Jordi, DJ Antoine, Bastian Baker, Nickless or Damian Lynn.

Besides album and singles releases, the company is into publishing through Globi Verlag. It also marketed electronic Atari game consoles including Pac-man etc., a series of Arkade compilations and later on VHS video cassettes.

According to IFPI Switzerland, it had also nearly two-thirds of the digital sales and downloads in Switzerland.
