= Vidbir =

Ukrainian musical competition

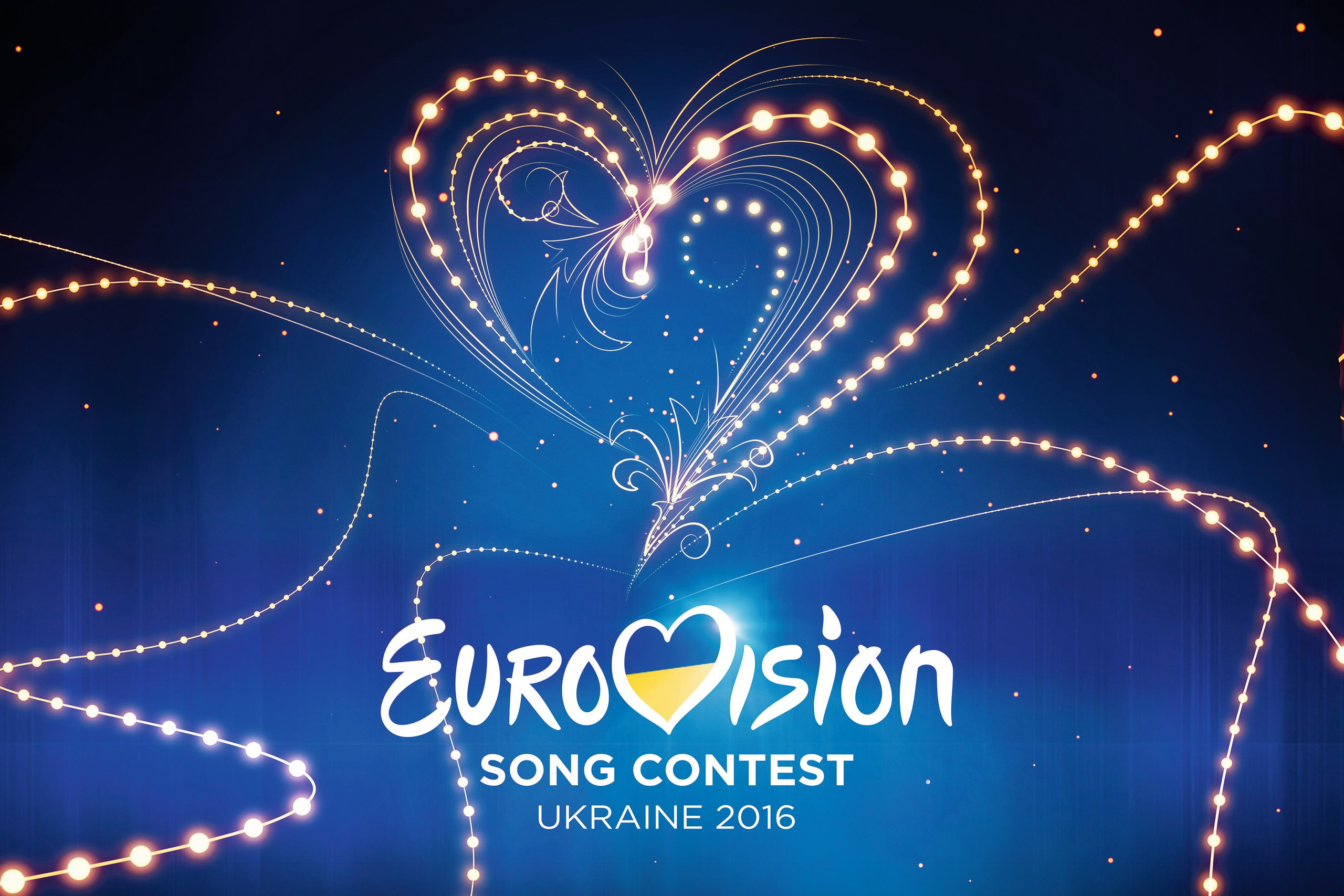
- Also known as: Natsionalnyi vidbir or Natsvidbir
- Genre: Song contest
- Developed by: Starlight Production (2016—2020, 2023, 2025—); Former: 1+1 Production (2024); Friends Production (2022)
- Opening theme: "The Feeling" by Jason Tarver and Louise Dowd (2016–2020)
- Country of origin: Ukraine
- Original language: Ukrainian
- No. of seasons: 10
- No. of episodes: 21

Production
- Production locations: STB Studios, Hostomel (2016); Palace of Culture "KPI", Kyiv (2017–2020); NAU Center of Culture and Arts, Kyiv (2022); Maidan Nezalezhnosti metro station, Kyiv (2023); National WWII History Museum, Kyiv (2024)

Original release
- Network: STB (2016–2020); Pershyi (2016–2022); Suspilne Kultura (2023–2026)
- Release: 6 February 2016 – present

Related
- Junior Vidbir

Natsionalnyi vidbir (Ukrainian: Національний відбір, IPA: [nɐts⁽ʲ⁾ioˈnɑlʲnɪj wid⁽ʲ⁾ˈbir]; meaning "National selection"), informally known as Vidbir, is a Ukrainian musical competition originally organized by Suspilne and STB, which determines the Ukrainian representative at the Eurovision Song Contest. In late August 2021, it was announced that the two broadcasters had terminated their partnership, and that Suspilne was looking for a new selection format for the Eurovision Song Contest 2022, thus bringing an end to the original concept for Vidbir. In October 2021, Suspilne announced that the 2022 edition of Vidbir would be organized by it alone under a new format.

In the first year of the show, the local record for SMS voting was set when the show received 344,268 unique votes, 37.77% of which supported Jamala, who eventually became the winner of the Eurovision Song Contest 2016.

== Winners ==
Table key
1	Winner
2	Second place
3	Third place
†	Upcoming

Year	Artist	Song	At Eurovision			
Year	Artist	Song	Final	Points	Semi	Points
2016	Jamala	"1944"	1	534	2	287
2017	O.Torvald	"Time"	24	36	Host country	
2018	Mélovin	"Under the Ladder"	17	130	6	179
2019	Maruv	"Siren Song"	Withdrew (Note: Ukraine withdrew from the Eurovision Song Contest 2019 after Maruv and Suspilne were unable to reach an agreement on her participation in the contest as a result of controversy.)			
2020	Go_A	"Solovey"	Contest cancelled (Note: The 2020 contest was cancelled due to the COVID-19 pandemic.)			
2022	Alina Pash	"Shadows of Forgotten Ancestors"	Disqualified before Eurovision (Note: Alina Pash won Vidbir 2022 but was disqualified after it was discovered that her representative had provided Suspilne with a falsified travel certificate.)			
2023	Tvorchi	"Heart of Steel"	6	243	Automatically qualified (Note: Ukraine was unable to host the 2023 contest due to security concerns resulting from the Russian invasion of Ukraine. The United Kingdom, as the second-placing country in the 2022 contest, hosted on Ukraine's behalf, with Ukraine automatically qualifying for the 2023 final as the previous year's winning country.)	
2024	Alyona Alyona and Jerry Heil	"Teresa & Maria"	3	453	2	173
2025	Ziferblat	"Bird of Pray"	9	219	1	137
2026	Leléka	"Ridnym"	9	221	6	174

== Cast ==
Over the 10 editions of Vidbir, 14 music experts have been on the jury, two of them won Eurovision: Ruslana in 2004 and Jamala in 2016. Jamala is the only member of the Vidbir cast who has participated in every edition, as a contestant in 2016, as a jury member in 2017—2019 and 2022—2025, as an interval act in 2020, and as a music producer in 2026. Several participants have had different roles in different editions of Vidbir. Julia Sanina was a participant in 2016, a jury member in 2023 and a presenter in 2024. Tina Karol was a jury member in 2020 and 2022, as well as a music producer in 2025. Kateryna Pavlenko is the winner of Vidbir 2020, host of the 2023 edition, one of the jurors of 2025 edition, and a participant in the 2026 edition. Starting from 2023, the participants of the expert jury are selected through the Ukrainian e-governance app Diia.

Key:

Judge / Host / Music producer / Showrunner
Competed as a contestant

Judge	Vidbir									
Judge	2016	2017	2018	2019	2020	2022	2023	2024	2025	2026
Andriy Danylko										
Konstantin Meladze										
Ruslana										
Jamala										
Yevhen Filatov										
Tina Karol										
Vitaliy Drozdov										
Yaroslav Lodygin										
Julia Sanina	(Note: Runner-up of Vidbir 2016 as a lead vocalist of The Hardkiss.)									
Taras Topolia										
Serhiy Tanchynets										
Kateryna Pavlenko					(Note: Won Vidbir 2020 as a lead vocalist of Go_A.)					
Zlata Ognevich										
Kostyantyn Tomilchenko										

Host	Vidbir									
Host	2016	2017	2018	2019	2020	2022	2023	2024	2025	2026
Oleksandr Pedan										
Dmytro Tankovych										
Serhiy Prytula										
Masha Efrosinina										
Timur Miroshnychenko										
Zlata Ognevich										
Kateryna Pavlenko										
Julia Sanina										
Vasyl Baidak										
Lesia Nikitiuk										

Music producer	Vidbir										
Music producer	2016	2017	2018	2019	2020	2022	2023	2024	2025	2026	2027
Konstantin Meladze											
Ruslan Kvinta											
Mykhailo Koshovyi											
Dmytro Shurov											
Tina Karol											
Jamala											

Showrunner	Vidbir									
Showrunner	2016	2017	2018	2019	2020	2022	2023	2024	2025	2026
Natalia Franchuk										
Oleksiy Honcharenko										
Volodymyr Zavadyuk										
German Nenov										

== Editions ==
=== Editions overview ===
Color key

Male artist
Female artist
Band/duo

Year	Premiere	Final	Contestants	Episodes	Winner	Runner-up	Third place
2016	6 February 2016	21 February 2016	18	3	Jamala "1944"	The Hardkiss "Helpless"	Sunsay "Love Manifest"
2017	4 February 2017	25 February 2017	24	4	O.Torvald "Time"	Tayanna "I Love You"	Mélovin "Wonder"
2018	10 February 2018	24 February 2018	18	3	Mélovin "Under the Ladder"	Tayanna "Lelya"	Kadnay "Beat of the Universe"
2019	9 February 2019	23 February 2019	16	3	Maruv "Siren Song"	Freedom Jazz "Cupidon"	Kazka "Apart"
2020	8 February 2020	22 February 2020	16	3	Go_A "Solovey"	Khayat "Call for Love"	Krutь "99"
2022	12 February 2022		8	1	Alina Pash "Tini zabutykh predkiv"	Kalush Orchestra "Stefania"	Wellboy "Nozzy Bossy"
2023	17 December 2022		10	1	Tvorchi "Heart of Steel"	Krutь "Kolyskova"	Jerry Heil "When God Shut the Door"
2024	3 February 2024 (Note: Voting extended to the following day due to a crash in the voting app.)		11	1	Alyona Alyona and Jerry Heil "Teresa & Maria"	Ziferblat "Place I Call Home"	Mélovin "Dreamer"
2025	8 February 2025		10	1	Ziferblat "Bird of Pray"	Molodi "My Sea"	Masha Kondratenko "No Time to Cry"
2026	7 February 2026		10	1	Leléka "Ridnym"	Laud "Lightkeeper"	Jerry Heil "Catharticus (Prayer)"

=== 2016 ===
The final took place on 21 February 2016. The six entries that qualified from the semi-finals competed. The winner, "1944" performed by Jamala, was selected through the combination of votes from a public tele-vote and an expert jury. Ties were decided in favour of the entries that received higher scores from the public tele-vote. "1944" is the first Eurovision Song Contest song to feature lyrics in the Crimean Tatar language. 382,602 votes were registered by the tele-vote during the show. In addition to the performances of the competing entries, 2016 Irish Eurovision entrant Nicky Byrne performed the 2016 Irish entry "Sunlight" as a guest.

R/O	Artist	Song	Jury	Televote		Total	Place
R/O	Artist	Song	Jury	Percentage	Points	Total	Place
1	Brunettes Shoot Blondes	"Every Monday"	1	3.40%	1	2	6
2	NuAngels	"Higher"	3	5.94%	2	5	5
3	The Hardkiss	"Helpless"	6	21.11%	5	11	2
4	Jamala	"1944"	5	37.77%	6	11	1
5	Sunsay	"Love Manifest"	4	18.20%	4	8	3
6	Pur:Pur	"We Do Change"	2	13.58%	3	5	4

=== 2017 ===
Final took place on 25 February 2017. Special guests included Alma, Manel Navarro, Tamara Gachechiladze, Naviband, and Kasia Moś.

R/O	Artist	Song	Jury	Televote		Total	Place
R/O	Artist	Song	Jury	Percentage	Points	Total	Place
1	Salto Nazad	"O, mamo!"	1	11.35%	3	4	6
2	Mélovin	"Wonder"	2	31.22%	6	8	3
3	O.Torvald	"Time"	5	25.57%	5	10	1
4	Illaria	"Thank You for My Way"	4	7.43%	1	5	5
5	Tayanna	"I Love You"	6	16.69%	4	10	2
6	Rozhden	"Saturn"	3	7.73%	2	5	4

=== 2018 ===
Final took place on 24 February 2018. Special guests included Mikolas Josef and Madame Monsieur. 179,455 unique votes were received from SMS and App voting.

R/O	Artist	Song	Jury	Televote		Total	Place
R/O	Artist	Song	Jury	Percentage	Points	Total	Place
1	Kadnay	"Beat of the Universe"	3	18.61%	5	8	3
2	Tayanna	"Lelya"	6	16.62%	4	10	2
3	The Erised	"Heroes"	2	6.48%	1	3	6
4	Laud	"Waiting"	4	11.56%	2	6	4
5	Vilna	"Forest Song"	1	12.92%	3	4	5
6	Mélovin	"Under the Ladder"	5	33.81%	6	11	1

=== 2019 ===
The final took place on 23 February 2019 with special guests Lake Malawi and Bilal Hassani. More than 167,500 unique votes were received from SMS and app voting. Maruv was declared the winner after receiving the most votes among the six finalists. On 26 February 2019, three days after the final was aired, Ukraine withdrew from the Eurovision Song Contest 2019 after Maruv and UA:PBC were unable to reach an agreement on her participation in the contest as a result of controversy.

R/O	Artist	Song	Juries	Televote	Total	Place
1	Freedom Jazz	"Cupidon"	6	4	10	2
2	Yuko	"Galyna guliala"	4	1	5	5
3	Maruv	"Siren Song"	5	6	11	1
4	Brunettes Shoot Blondes	"Houston"	2	3	5	4
5	Kazka	"Apart"	3	5	8	3
6	Anna Maria	"My Road"	1	2	3	6

=== 2020 ===
R/O	Artist	Song	Jury	Televote (SMS) / App		Total	Place
R/O	Artist	Song	Jury	Percentage	Points	Total	Place
1	Krutь	"99"	5	19.90%	4	9	3
2	Jerry Heil	"Vegan"	1	7.00%	1	2	6
3	Go_A	"Solovey"	6	25.43%	6	12	1
4	David Axelrod	"Horizon"	3	11.30%	2	5	5
5	Khayat	"Call for Love"	4	20.93%	5	9	2
6	Tvorchi	"Bonfire"	2	15.44%	3	5	4

Following the cancellation of the Eurovision Song Contest 2020 due to the COVID-19 pandemic, Go_A was internally re-selected to represent Ukraine in the 2021 edition, this time with the song "Shum".

=== 2022 ===
R/O	Artist	Song	Jury	Televote (SMS) / App			Total	Place
R/O	Artist	Song	Jury	Votes	Percentage	Points	Total	Place
1 (Note: Due to technical issues during the first performance, Cloudless had to perform their song again after all the other songs.)	Cloudless	"All Be Alright"	1	3,410	4.81%	4	5	7
2	Michael Soul	"Demons"	2	1,239	1.75%	1	3	8
3	Our Atlantic	"Moia liubov"	5	1,605	2.27%	2	7	6
4	Barleben	"Hear My Words"	4	2,740	3.87%	3	7	5
5	Kalush Orchestra	"Stefania"	6	31,634	44.66%	8	14	2
6	Roxolana	"Girlzzzz"	3	5,034	7.11%	5	8	4
7	Wellboy	"Nozzy Bossy"	7	5,642	7.96%	6	13	3
8	Alina Pash	"Tini zabutykh predkiv"	8	19,535	27.58%	7	15	1

Following controversy regarding her travel history, Alina Pash's status as a legitimate participant, and therefore winner, of Vidbir was challenged, which resulted in her participation being ceased by Suspilne as well as her withdrawal. The runner-up, Kalush Orchestra, was chosen as the Ukrainian entrant for the Eurovision Song Contest 2022.

=== 2023 ===
R/O	Artist	Song	Jury	Public vote (via Diia)		Total	Place
R/O	Artist	Song	Jury	Votes	Points	Total	Place
1	Moisei	"I'm Not Alone"	1	5,393	6	7	7
2	OY Sound System	"Oy, tuzhu"	5	2,496	2	7	8
3	Demchuk	"Alive"	7	3,936	4	11	5
4	Jerry Heil	"When God Shut the Door"	8	45,657	9	17	3
5	Fiinka	"Dovbush"	6	11,109	7	13	4
6	Krutь	"Kolyskova"	10	33,614	8	18	2
7	Tember Blanche	"Ya vdoma"	2	3,411	3	5	9
8	Angelina	"Stronger"	3	2,424	1	4	10
9	2Tone	"Kvitka"	4	4,681	5	9	6
10	Tvorchi	"Heart of Steel"	9	54,041	10	19	1

=== 2024 ===
In this edition, the public determined a wildcard entry through an online vote. During the show, aired on 3 February 2024, the voting app crashed, causing the voting window to be extended to the following day.

R/O	Artist	Song	Jury	Public vote (via Diia)		Total	Place
R/O	Artist	Song	Jury	Votes	Points	Total	Place
1	Yaktak	"Lalala"	6	107,227	10	16	4
2	Ingret	"Keeper"	8	15,238	2	10	6
3	Nazva	"Slavic English"	2	14,852	1	3	11
4	Anka	"Palala"	5	19,183	4	9	8
5	Drevo	"Endless Chain"	4	16,235	3	7	9
6	Alyona Alyona and Jerry Heil	"Teresa & Maria"	10	723,297	11	21	1
7	Mélovin	"Dreamer"	9	82,838	9	18	3
8	Skylerr	"Time Is Running Out"	3	38,177	6	9	7
9	Ziferblat	"Place I Call Home"	11	64,276	8	19	2
10	Yagody	"Tsunamia"	7	62,269	7	14	5
11	Nahaba	"Glasss"	1	23,593	5	6	10

=== 2025 ===
The final was held on 8 February 2025 with many veteran Ukrainian Eurovision performers as guests, including Alyona Alyona, Jamala, Jerry Heil, Kalush, Kateryna Pavlenko, Mélovin, Ruslana, Tina Karol, and Tvorchi. Artem Kotenko and Svitlana Tarabarova also performed "Hear Me Now," which finished in third place at Junior Eurovision Song Contest 2024.

R/O	Artist	Song	Jury	Public vote		Total	Place
R/O	Artist	Song	Jury	Votes	Points	Total	Place
1	Vlad Sheryf	"Wind of Change"	1	2,302	1	2	10
2	Abiie	"Dim"	2	5,595	3	5	9
3	Molodi	"My Sea"	7	70,885	9	16	2
4	Future Culture	"Waste My Time"	5	2,338	2	7	8
5	Masha Kondratenko	"No Time to Cry"	8	62,439	8	16	3
6	Khayat	"Honor"	10	44,299	6	16	4
7	Fiїnka	"Kultura"	6	52,858	7	13	5
8	Krylata	"Stay True"	4	11,726	4	8	7
9	Ziferblat	"Bird of Pray"	9	90,390	10	19	1
10	DK Enerhetyk	"Sil"	3	19,556	5	8	6

=== 2026 ===
R/O	Artist	Song	Jury	Public vote		Total	Place
R/O	Artist	Song	Jury	Votes	Points	Total	Place
1	Valeriya Force	"Open Our Hearts"	4	8,571	2	6	9
2	Molodi	"Legends"	2	13,515	4	6	8
3	Monokate	"Tut"	6	12,902	3	9	6
4	The Elliens	"Crawling Whispers"	1	16,003	5	6	7
5	Laud	"Lightkeeper"	9	37,863	9	18	2
6	Leléka	"Ridnym"	10	60,050	10	20	1
7	Mr. Vel	"Do or Done"	7	17,522	6	13	4
8	Khayat	"Hertsy"	5	19,007	7	12	5
9	Jerry Heil	"Catharticus (Prayer)"	8	35,721	8	16	3
10	ShchukaRybа	"Moia zemlia"	3	6,446	1	4	10

== Ratings ==
Year	Semi-Final			Final	Ref.
Year	First	Second	Third	Final	Ref.
2016	9.7%	10.3%	—N/a	13.5%	
2017	10.6%	8.8%	8.2%	9.1%	
2018	9.0%	11.3%	—N/a	13.9%	
2019	10.8%	11.1%	—N/a	13.1%	
2020	10.7%	10.4%	—N/a	13.3%	
2022	—N/a			3.83%	
