= Russia–Ukraine relations in the Eurovision Song Contest =

Russia–Ukraine Eurovision Song Contest relations
- Russia: Ukraine

The All-Russia State Television and Radio Broadcasting Company (RTR) and Channel One Russia (C1R) represented Russia in the Eurovision Song Contest from 1994 to 2021, while the Public Broadcasting Company of Ukraine (UA:PBC/Suspilne) and its predecessor National Television Company of Ukraine (NTU) have represented Ukraine since 2003. Until 2014, the two countries had positive relations, and exchanged top-3 points with each other several times. Barring a minor dispute over Ukraine's 2007 entry "Dancing Lasha Tumbai" (whose title was alleged to be a mondegreen of "Russia goodbye", but was defended by its performer as being meaningless), notable conflicts began to emerge between the two countries at the contest in the wake of the Russian annexation of Crimea in 2014.

In 2016, Ukraine's entry was "1944", a song by Jamala that was inspired by her great-grandmother's experiences during the deportation of the Crimean Tatars by the Soviet Union. The song was criticised by Russian officials, who argued that it violated Eurovision rules against political content due to its allusions to the Russian annexation of Crimea. "1944" would ultimately win the contest. While there were calls for Russia to boycott the 2017 contest in Kyiv over the war in Donbas, Russia did unveil an entrant—Julia Samoylova. However, after she was unveiled, it was reported that Samoylova had been banned from entering Ukraine for three years for violating a Ukrainian ban on direct travel to Crimea from Russia. The European Broadcasting Union (EBU) attempted to reconcile the issues so that Samoylova could perform, calling upon the Ukrainian government to remove or defer her travel ban for the contest, and offering Russia the opportunity to perform their song from a remote venue. However, C1R passed on the offer, wanting to have Samoylova perform in Kyiv as with all other entrants. On 13 April 2017, Channel One announced that it would not broadcast the contest, effectively withdrawing.

Ukraine withdrew from the 2019 contest, after the winner of its national final Maruv as well as the runners-up all refused to sign the participation contract, which required them to refrain from touring in Russia for a period of time. It was the first time since 2015 that Ukraine was absent from the contest.

Prior to the 2022 contest, controversy again emerged in the Ukrainian national final, resulting in its winner Alina Pash, who was alleged to have travelled to Crimea in violation of Ukrainian laws, replaced by runner-up Kalush Orchestra as the Ukrainian entrant. Following the Russian invasion of Ukraine and subsequent protests from other participating countries, Russia was excluded from participating in the contest, where Ukraine went on to win. As a result, Ukraine was initially given the opportunity to host the 2023 contest. However, the EBU later decided that the country would not be able to host due to security concerns caused by the Russian invasion, with the United Kingdom, which had finished in second place in 2022, being chosen to host on Ukraine's behalf.

== 2007 contest ==
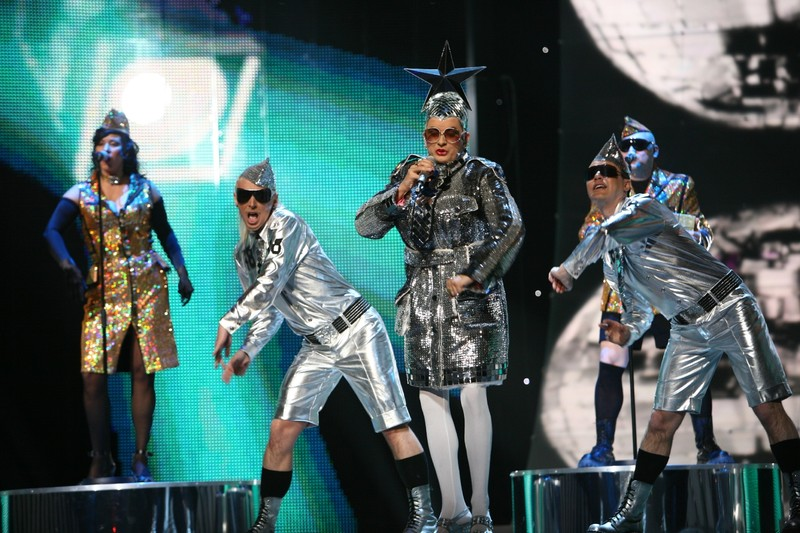
Verka Serduchka, Ukraine's entrant in the Eurovision Song Contest 2007

Verka Serduchka was chosen to represent Ukraine at the 2007 contest with the song "Dancing Lasha Tumbai". However, it was alleged that the song had contained political subtext, including a reference in its lyrics to Maidan (the site of the Orange Revolution demonstrations), and that the phrase "Lasha Tumbai" was a mondegreen of "Russia goodbye". Serduchka denied these allegations, claiming that the phrase "lasha tumbai" was Mongolian for "churned butter". On the Russian talk show Let Them Talk, which aired on Channel One Russia just after the final of the contest, a native Mongolian speaker explained that the phrase "Lasha Tumbai" does not exist in the Mongolian language. Serduchka later stated that "Lasha Tumbai" was a meaningless phrase meant to rhyme with other lyrics.

== 2009 contest ==
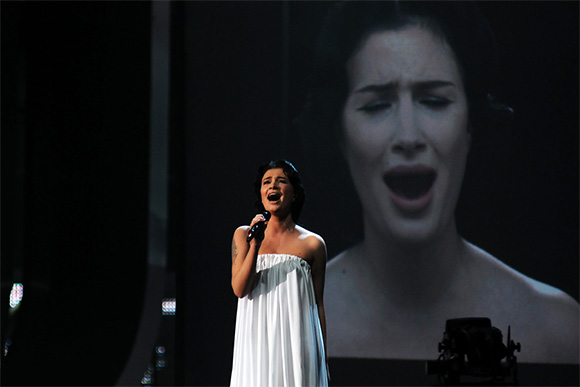
Ukrainian-born Anastasia Prikhodko, Russia's entrant in the Eurovision Song Contest 2009

In the 2009 contest, held in Moscow after Russia's win the previous year, Russia was represented by Ukrainian singer Anastasia Prikhodko, who had entered and won the Russian national selection after being disqualified from the Ukrainian one. She performed her song "Mamo", singing in both Ukrainian and Russian languages. Following the Russian annexation of Crimea in 2014, Prikhodko denounced Russia's actions and ceased performing there.

== 2014 and 2015 contests ==
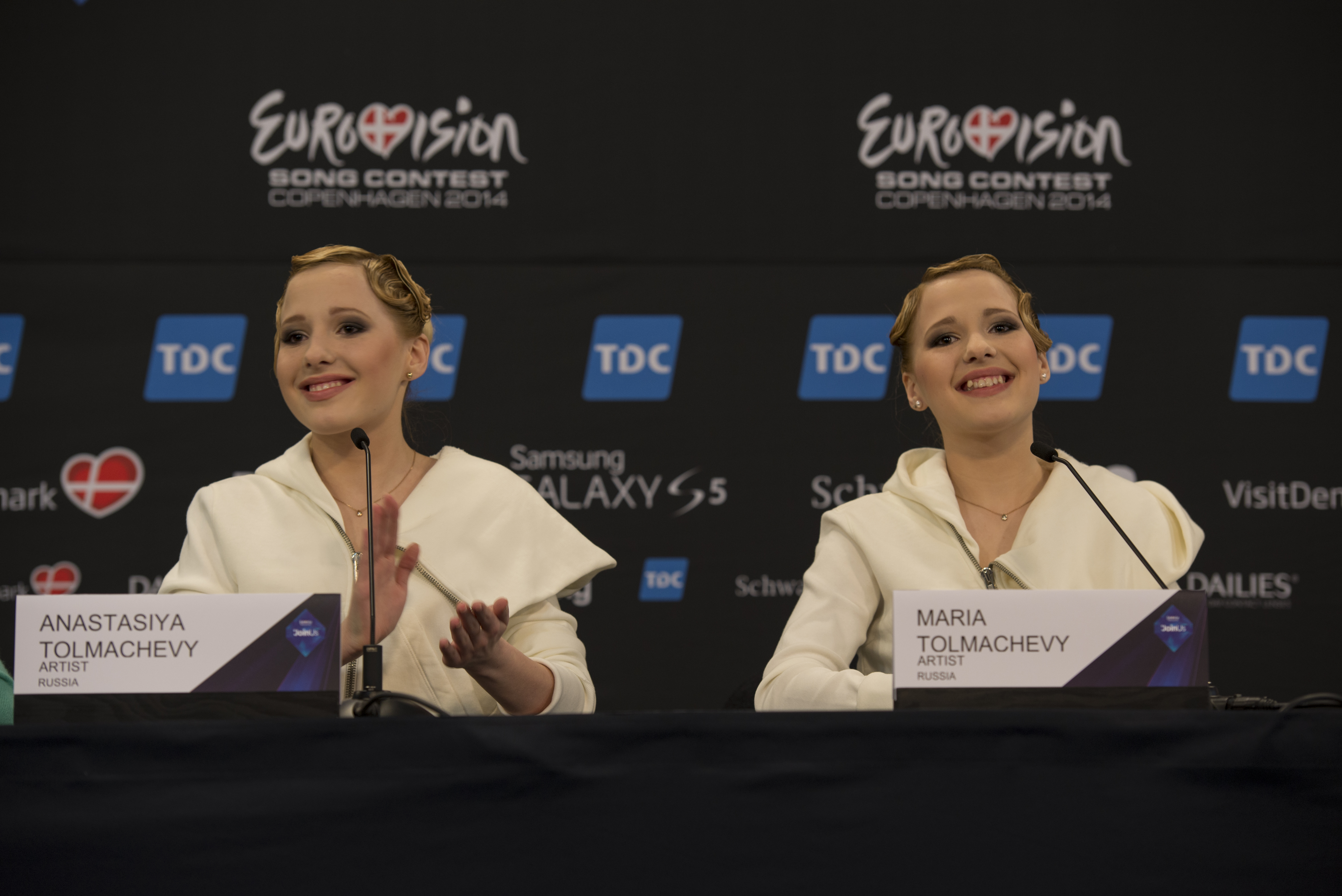
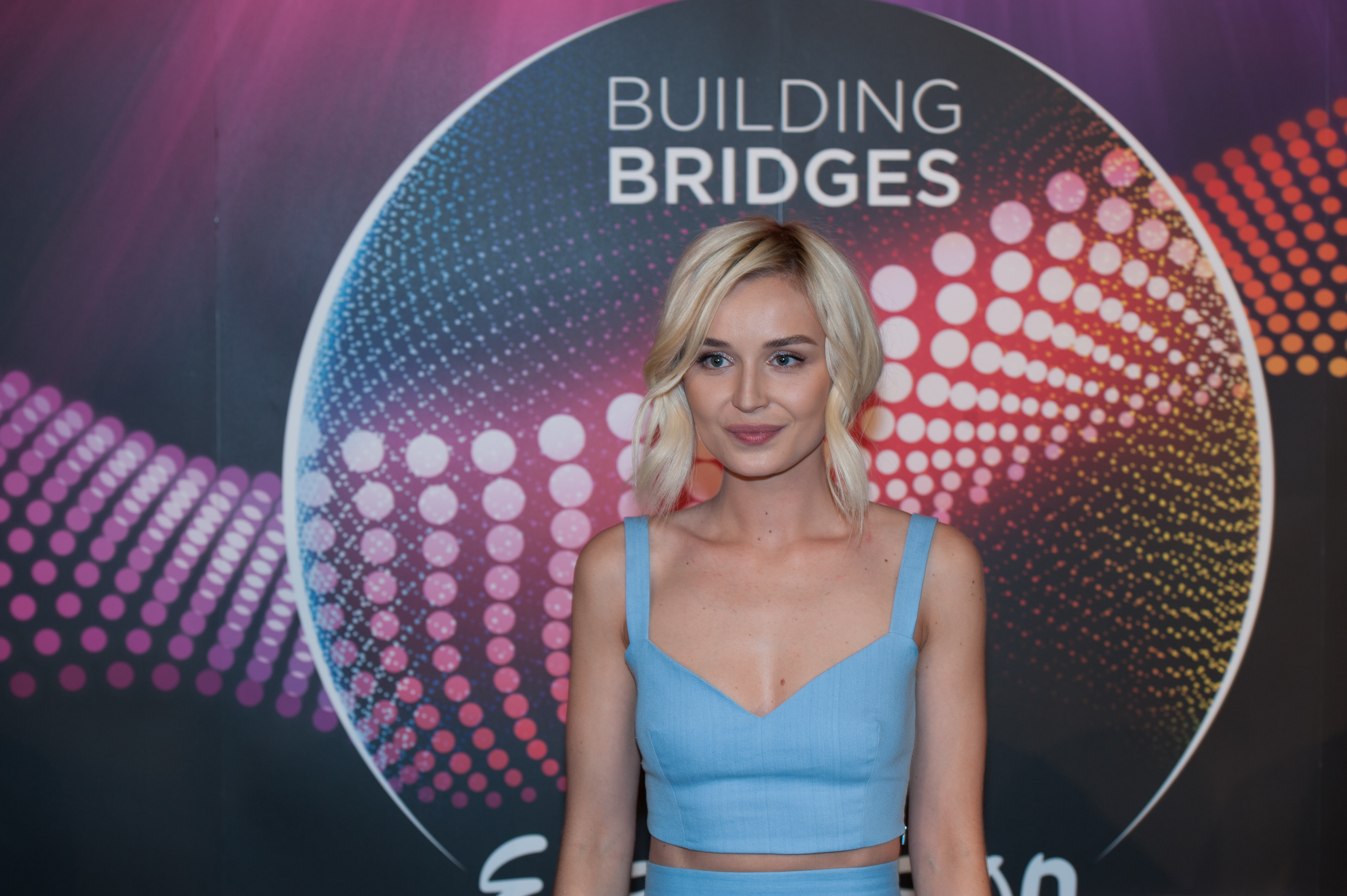
The Tolmachevy Sisters and Polina Gagarina, Russia's entrants in the Eurovision Song Contest 2014 and 2015, respectively

In the wake of the Russian military intervention in Ukraine and subsequent annexation of Crimea from Ukraine in 2014, as well as the introduction of a "gay propaganda" law in Russia in 2013, public opposition to Russia became visible on multiple fronts, including the Eurovision Song Contest. The Russian entrants at the 2014 and 2015 contests, the Tolmachevy Sisters and Polina Gagarina respectively, were the subject of booing from the audience, in particular at any time they were mentioned or awarded points. Commenting on the booing at the Tolmachevy Sisters, Fraser Nelson, editor of The Spectator magazine, wrote: "I can't remember the last time I heard a Eurovision audience boo anyone; during the Iraq war in 2003, no one booed Britain. [...] There's a difference between the Russian government and the Russian people, and the girls were there to represent the latter. They didn't deserve the obloquy. And the Danes were wrong to have made the booing so audible." The booing in 2014 led the organisers of the 2015 contest to install 'anti-booing technology', which was deployed for the first time in the history of the contest. The Tolmachevy Sisters and Gagarina have since expressed their support for the Russian invasion of Ukraine, with the latter notably performing at the 2022 Moscow rally.

== 2016 contest ==
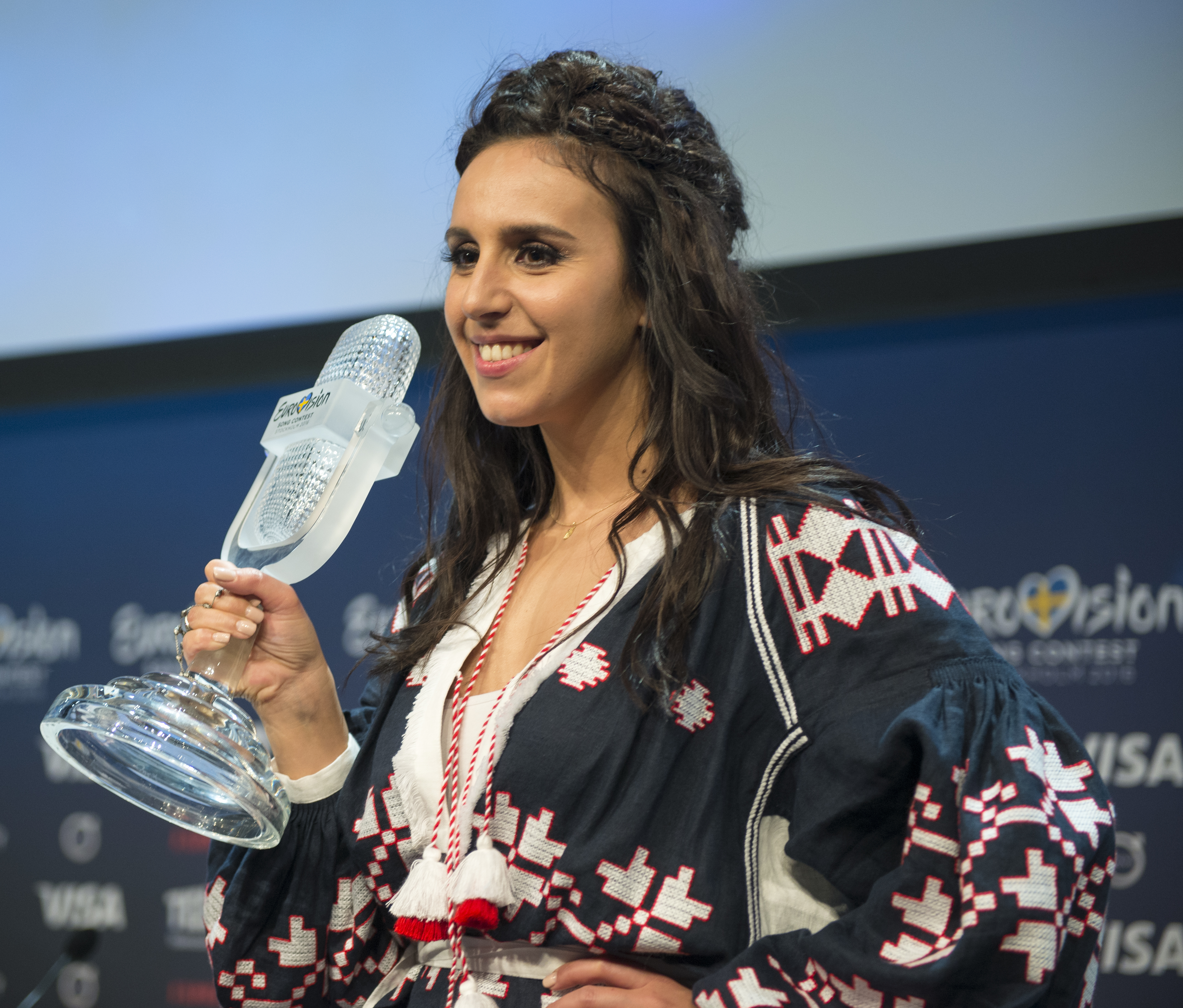
Jamala, winner of the Eurovision Song Contest 2016 for Ukraine

Jamala, who represented Ukraine at the 2016 contest, won with the song "1944". The lyrics for her song concern the deportation of the Crimean Tatars, in the 1940s, by the Soviet Union at the hands of Joseph Stalin because of their alleged collaboration with the Nazis. Jamala explained that the lyrics were inspired by the story of her great-grandmother Nazylkhan, who was in her mid-20s when she and her five children were deported to barren Central Asia. One of the daughters did not survive the journey. The contest's rules state that "no lyrics, speeches, gestures of political or similar nature shall be permitted", so Jamala repeatedly stated that her song was not referencing the 2014 annexation of Crimea, but her own personal family history. She stated, "I needed that song to free myself, to release the memory of my great-grandmother, the memory of that girl who has no grave." However, she also referenced the current state of Crimea post-annexation, saying "Of course [the song is] about 2014 as well." "Now the Crimean Tatars are on occupied territory and it is very hard for them. They are under tremendous pressure. Some have disappeared without a trace. And that is terrifying. I would not want to see history repeat itself."

Russian officials, including multiple MPs and the spokesperson of the Ministry of Foreign Affairs Maria Zakharova, were dissatisfied with the outcome and alleged that the song was a political statement and an allusion on the 2014 annexation of Crimea, forbidden by the rules of the contest. Zakharova wrote in a Facebook post that the next Eurovision winner "might as well be about the conflict in Syria", proposing the lyrics: "Assad blood, Assad worst. Give me prize, that we can host." Other officials suggested boycotting the Ukraine-hosted 2017 contest, with Frants Klintsevich, deputy chairman of the Federation Council Committee on Defense and Security stating, "It was not the Ukrainian singer Jamala and her song '1944' that won Eurovision 2016, it was politics that beat art. If nothing changes in Ukraine by next year, then I don't think we need to take part."

Despite this, Russia's entrant Sergey Lazarev, who placed third in the competition, congratulated Jamala on her win. Lazarev was later sanctioned by the Ukrainian government in January 2023 for his support of the Russian invasion of Ukraine.

== 2017 contest ==
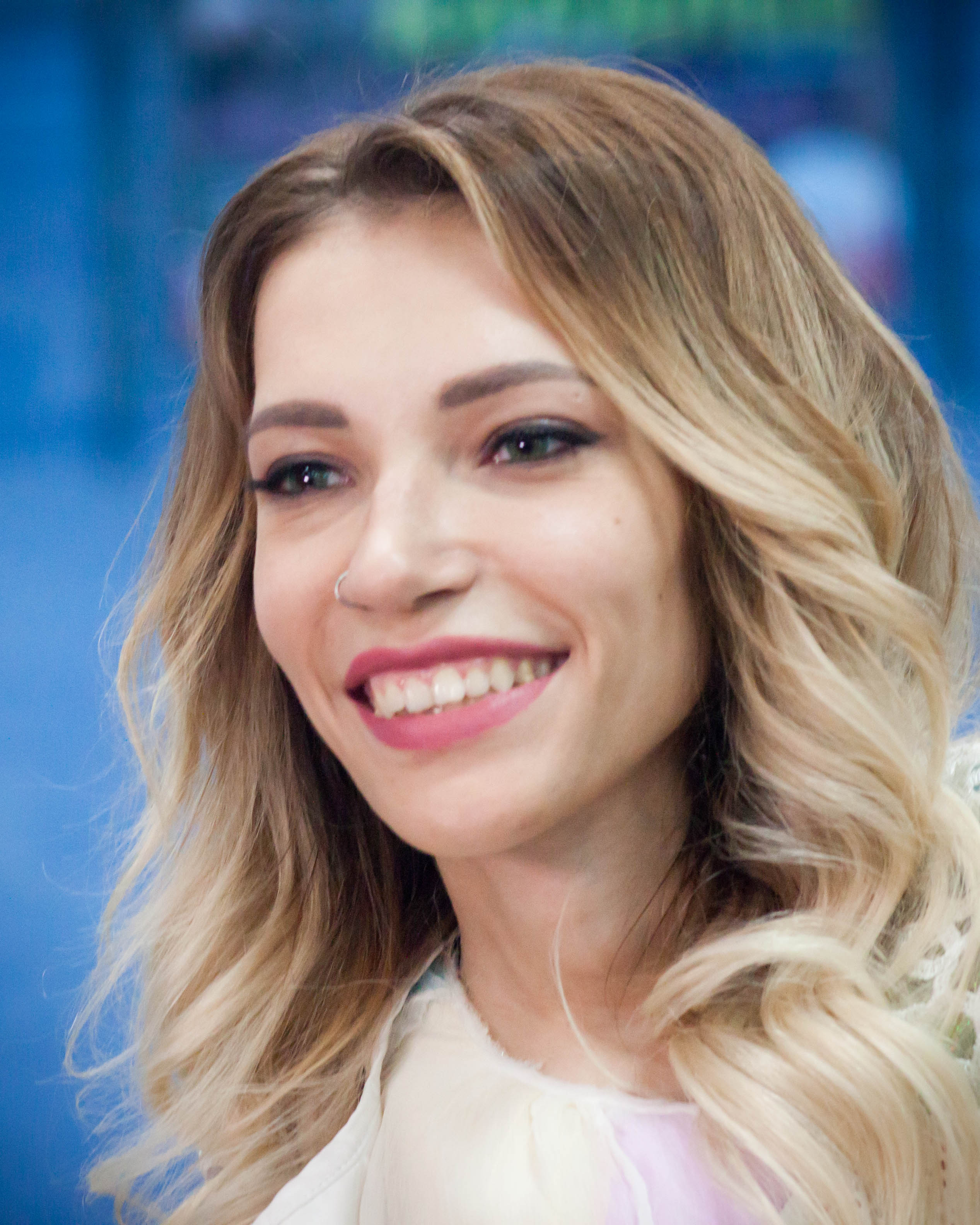
Julia Samoylova, Russia's entrant in the Eurovision Song Contest 2017, received a three-year travel ban by the Security Service of Ukraine and was thus unable to perform in the contest.

The Russian military intervention in Ukraine, which began in late February 2014, prompted a number of governments to apply sanctions against individuals, businesses and officials from Russia. In 2015, the Ukrainian government began to blacklist people who supported the 2014 annexation of Crimea by Russia from entering the country. Deputy Prime Minister Vyacheslav Kyrylenko stated that the country would not lift this ban for the Eurovision Song Contest 2017. The European Broadcasting Union (EBU) iterated that their goal was for Eurovision to remain inclusive, and that they were "engaging in constructive dialogue with the Public Broadcasting Company of Ukraine (UA:PBC) and the Ukrainian authorities to ensure that all delegates and artists can come and stay in Ukraine". A representative of the host broadcaster told Billboard that the blacklist rules were beyond their control. On 3 March 2017, Russian politician Vitaly Milonov called upon the country to withdraw from the 2017 contest amid fears of the ongoing conflict in eastern Ukraine. He described Russia as being "unwelcome guests in a country seized by fanatics".

=== Russian selection, travel ban ===
It was reported on 13 March 2017 that Ukrainian officials were investigating Julia Samoylova, Russia's entrant at the 2017 contest, for having violated a ban on direct travel to Crimea from Russia; she had visited Kerch in 2015 to give a performance. Ukrainian officials have speculated that Russia's choice of Samoylova may have been a deliberate political statement, having knowingly picked a singer who had performed in the disputed territory in order to instigate a political controversy; interior minister adviser Anton Herashchenko stated that he could not "exclude that actions could be taken by our side to deny her entry" if Russia was using the entry as a "provocation", while the deputy director of ATR, a Ukrainian television broadcaster that serves the Crimean Tatar population, argued that it was a "cynical and immoral move". Minister of Foreign Affairs of Ukraine Pavlo Klimkin stated that he considers the choice of Samoylova as the Eurovision participant is most likely to be a provocation from Russia. Later the President of Ukraine Petro Poroshenko stated the same. Ben Royston, who had advised past Eurovision delegations in Azerbaijan and Sweden, argued that Russia's choice of a performer with a disability may have also been deliberate, explaining to The Guardian that "[Russia] chose a wheelchair-bound contestant who had made pro-Russian statements about Crimea on social media. She was never going to be allowed in Ukraine, but they chose her anyway. And now Russia are very publicly saying: 'How can Ukraine let this poor sweet girl in a wheelchair be the victim of your laws?' It seems clearly all part of the Russia PR machine." Russia has denied that their choice of performer was meant to be a political statement, and stated that their choice of a performer with a disability was meant to be an expression of diversity.

The Security Service of Ukraine (SBU) confirmed on 22 March 2017 that Samoylova had been banned from entering Ukraine for three years for illegally travelling to Crimea from Russia, thus violating article 204-2 of Code of Ukraine on Administrative Offenses. The EBU responded by stating that it was continuing to ensure that all entrants would be able to perform in Kyiv, but that "we are deeply disappointed in this decision as we feel it goes against both the spirit of the contest and the notion of inclusiveness that lies at the heart of its values", and also stated that EBU will respect the laws of hosting country. Frants Klintsevich, First Deputy Chairman of the Federation Council Committee on Defence and Security, threatened that Russia would boycott Eurovision unless its organisers declared the government decision to be "unacceptable". He also accused them of being "completely politicised and biased".

=== Attempts to reconcile ===
The EBU offered a compromise to Channel One Russia on 23 March 2017, in which Samoylova would be allowed to perform remotely from a venue of the broadcaster's choice; it would have been the first time that a Eurovision entry had been performed from an outside venue via satellite. However, Channel One declined the offer, arguing that Samoylova should be allowed to perform on-stage in Kyiv as with every other entrant, and accusing Ukraine of violating assurances in the Eurovision rules that all performers would be issued the appropriate visas so they could enter the host country. Vice Prime Minister Vyacheslav Kyrylenko had stated that it is illegal for persona non grata to participate in tours or television programmes. Jon Ola Sand, executive supervisor of the contest, stated in an interview with the Danish national broadcaster DR, that he and other members of the European Broadcasting Union had contacted the Ukrainian security services about the possibilities of delaying the imposed ban until after the 2017 contest had concluded.

EBU general director Ingrid Deltenre stated that Ukraine's behaviour was "absolutely unacceptable", and abused the Eurovision Song Contest ethos for "political action". Deltenre further went on to say that the EBU were in talks with Ukrainian prime minister Volodymyr Groysman and president Petro Poroshenko, in regards to delaying the ban until after the contest. On 1 April 2017, Deltenre threatened to ban Ukraine from future competitions if Samoylova is not allowed to participate. In response, UA:PBC urged the EBU to respect the sovereignty of Ukraine.

=== Withdrawal ===
In an interview with German newspaper Der Tagesspiegel published on 26 March 2017, the contest's Reference Group chairman Frank-Dieter Freiling noted that Russia's participation in the contest seemed to be unclear, acknowledging that Samoylova had not participated in mandatory previewing sessions prior to the ban, nor had the Russian delegation reserved any accommodations in Kyiv for the contest. He suggested that Russia may have been aware that their selection would be problematic.

On 13 April 2017, Channel One announced that it would not broadcast the 2017 contest. The EBU considered the decision to be an official withdrawal from the contest.

=== Reactions from other EBU members ===
- San Marino – Carlo Romeo, Director General of the Sammarinese broadcaster San Marino RTV, reacted to the decision to ban Samoylova as unacceptable behaviour, that the broadcaster does not care about conspiracy or provocation towards the Russian entrant, and that the song contest is about being on "neutral ground".
- Denmark – Jan Lagermand Lundme, Head of Entertainment of the Danish broadcaster DR, stated in an interview on 25 March 2017 that the 2017 contest has become a "political battleground", and was fairly satisfied with the work the EBU was carrying out in order to resolve the issue on the ban imposed by Ukraine.
- Germany – Head of Entertainment for the German broadcaster ARD, Thomas Schreiber, reacted to the situation during an interview with Deutsche Welle. Schreiber stated that the situation between Russia and Ukraine was of a critical nature, and that he felt that both the Russian broadcaster and the Ukrainian authorities were to blame and that the resolution was dependent on the goodwill of both parties.
- Serbia – Radio Television of Serbia (RTS) stated on 14 April 2017 that they regret the situation and believed that Eurovision should be a place of unity of the nations, and not to divide them. RTS went on to mention about a similar period of difficulty they endured, when they were expelled from the organisation between 1992 and 2004 for political reasons.

== 2019 contest ==
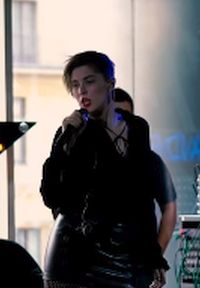
Maruv, Ukraine's selected artist for the Eurovision Song Contest 2019, attracted controversy in the country due to her willingness to perform in Russia.

Controversy emerged during the Ukrainian national final for the Eurovision Song Contest 2019 regarding contestants' ties to Russia. During the final of the competition on 23 February 2019, jury members Jamala, Andriy Danylko, and Yevhen Filatov interrogated several contestants regarding their thoughts on Russia, mainly focusing on Maruv and Anna Maria. Jamala asked Maruv on whether Maruv believed Crimea was Ukrainian territory, to which she agreed. Anna Maria were asked, if they had to choose between the two, would they choose their country of Ukraine or their mother, who worked for the Russian-led government of Crimea. During the final, it was announced by the Ukrainian broadcaster, UA:PBC, that the broadcaster had reserved the right to change the decision made by the jury and Ukrainian public.

After Maruv was declared the winner of the selection, it was confirmed she was not yet confirmed as the Ukrainian representative, and discussions would take place between Maruv and UA:PBC. It emerged that Maruv's representative was sent a contract which she had a 48-hour deadline to sign in order to represent Ukraine. A major feature of the contract was that she must cancel all upcoming performances and appearances in Russia within 24 hours. Maruv later revealed that the broadcaster's contract had additionally banned her from improvising on stage and communicating with any journalist without the permission of the broadcaster, and required her to fully comply with any requests from the broadcaster. If she were to not follow any of these clauses, she would be fined ₴2 million (~€67,000). Maruv also stated that the broadcaster would not give her any financial compensation for the competition and would not pay for the trip to Tel Aviv.

On 25 February, both Maruv and UA:PBC confirmed that she would not represent Ukraine in the contest due to disputes over the contract, and that another act would be chosen. Viktor Taran, a board member for UA:PBC, later revealed that Maruv refused to cancel her concerts in Russia which led to her refusal to sign the contract. Taran also alleged that Maruv and her lawyers did not believe that she was responsible for representing the views of the Ukrainian government, if she were to become the country's representative at the contest.

National final runner-up Freedom Jazz announced on 26 February that they had rejected the broadcaster's offer to represent Ukraine as well, with third-place finisher Kazka confirming they had also rejected the offer the following day. On 27 February, UA:PBC confirmed that Ukraine would withdraw from the contest following the controversy. In their withdrawal statement, the broadcaster stated that the national selection "has drawn attention to a systemic problem with the music industry in Ukraine – the connection of artists with an aggressor state".

== 2022 contest ==
=== Ukrainian artist replacement ===
Following the controversy surrounding the Ukrainian national final in 2019, a new rule was introduced starting from 2020 which bars artists who have performed in Russia since 2014 or have entered Crimea "in violation of the legislation of Ukraine" from entering the competition. The Ukrainian national final for the Eurovision Song Contest 2022 was won by Alina Pash. On 14 February 2022, two days after the selection, activist and video blogger Serhii Sternenko alleged that Pash had entered Crimea from Russian territory in 2015, and counterfeited her travel documentation with her team in order to take part in the selection. The Ukrainian broadcaster UA:PBC subsequently stated that they would request the Ukrainian State Border Guard Service to verify if the documentation is forged, and that Pash would not officially be the Ukrainian representative at the contest "until the verification and clarification of the facts is completed". Andrii Demchenko, speaking on behalf of the Border Guard, maintained that the certificate Pash had handed in to the broadcaster had not been issued by them, but that a request to cross the border had been made by the artist, and that the broadcaster would be provided with the results of the investigation by 16 February. Pash's management later stated that she had entered Crimea from the Ukrainian border, and that the certificate had been requested by a "team member" rather than Pash herself. On 16 February, Pash claimed on an Instagram post that the Border Guard had not been able to provide her with a new certificate as proof of her entrance to Crimea, since related records are only kept for five years. Shortly after, Pash announced on her social media pages that she would withdraw her candidacy as the Ukrainian representative at the contest. Runner-up of the selection, Kalush Orchestra, were offered to represent Ukraine in Pash's place on 17 February, and a final decision was expected to be made during a meeting on 18 February. On 22 February, UA:PBC confirmed that Kalush Orchestra had accepted the offer.

=== Exclusion of Russia ===
In the wake of the Russian invasion of Ukraine, which began on 24 February 2022, UA:PBC appealed to suspend Russian EBU member broadcasters VGTRK and Channel One from the union, and to exclude Russia from competing in the contest. The appeal alleged that since the beginning of the Russian military intervention in Ukraine in 2014, VGTRK and Channel One have been a mouthpiece for the Russian government and a key tool of political propaganda financed from the Russian state budget. The EBU initially stated that Russia as well as Ukraine would still be allowed to participate in the contest, citing the non-political nature of the event. The following day, the EBU announced that Russia was excluded from participating in the contest, stating that "in light of the unprecedented crisis in Ukraine, the inclusion of a Russian entry in this year's Contest would bring the competition into disrepute."

Before Russia was cut from participating, many participating broadcasters called on the EBU to take action. According to Gustav Lützhøft, editor-in-chief of Dansk Melodi Grand Prix for Danish broadcaster DR, "we find it incompatible with Eurovision's values that Russia is participating." Sweden's SVT, Iceland's RÚV, Lithuania's LRT and Norway's NRK also called on the EBU to exclude Russia from the contest, while the Netherlands' AVROTROS, Poland's TVP and Ukraine's UA:PBC additionally called on the EBU to suspend Russia's membership in the union. Estonia's ERR and Finland's Yle stated that they would not participate if Russia were invited. Citi Zēni, the Latvian representatives at the 2022 contest, also urged the EBU to reconsider Russian participation, stating: "We believe that Eurovision is about peace, entertainment and love. It is completely in opposition with the politics currently conducted by the governing bodies of the Russian Federation. In our opinion it is not correct to be sending an artist to one EBU country, while an army is being deployed to another."

On 26 February 2022, all EBU members from Russia, including VGTRK and Channel One, announced their withdrawal from the union via a statement released by Russian state media, in response to their exclusion from the contest, which they regarded as "an inappropriate political sacrifice at a music forum that has always emphasized its non-political status". The EBU itself had yet to receive a confirmation of withdrawal, though it announced the suspension of its Russian members from its governance structures on 1 March. The EBU's Director-General Noel Curran stated on 13 May that work was underway to fully suspend Russian members from the union. On 26 May, the EBU made effective the suspension of its Russian members, causing Russia to indefinitely lose broadcasting and participation rights for future Eurovision events.

Russia had not publicly announced an artist or song before being excluded, but it was later reported that Yaroslava Simonova was selected as the Russian representative prior to the exclusion.

=== Ukrainian preparations ===
Following the start of the Russian invasion of Ukraine, UA:PBC and Kalush Orchestra had yet to formally comment on whether their participation in the contest would continue. On 14 March 2022, Claudio Fasulo and Simona Martorelli, executive producers of the 2022 contest, confirmed that Ukraine would still be competing; this was later reaffirmed by UA:PBC on 19 March via a post on its social media pages. They added that work would commence on the Ukrainian 'live-on-tape' backup performance, which was planned to be recorded in Lviv and used in the event that the delegation cannot travel to Turin, however, the delegation was later exempted from the requirement to do so. On 2 April, UA:PBC confirmed that Kalush Orchestra and the rest of the delegation was given permission to travel to Turin for the contest, adding that the group would also take part in promotional events across Europe to raise donations for war relief efforts.

=== Attempted cyber attacks ===
On 11 May 2022, pro-Russia hacker group Killnet carried out an attack on numerous Italian institutional websites, including those of the Ministry of Defense, the Senate, the National Health Institute and the Automobile Club d'Italia. The official website of the Eurovision Song Contest was later revealed to be among those that were targeted, in addition to the platform on which the contest's voting system is based. Additional attacks were reported to have taken place during the first semi-final and the final. The attacks were ultimately unsuccessful, and there were no disruptions to either the website or the voting platform.

=== On-stage statements ===
During the broadcast of the final, after Kalush Orchestra had finished their performance, the group's frontman Oleh Psiuk shouted onstage: "I ask all of you, please help Ukraine, Mariupol. Help Azovstal, right now!" The contest's rules precludes promoting political statements and messages, and several commentators noted that Psiuk's statement could be in breach of the rules. However, the EBU deemed the statement to be "humanitarian rather than political in nature”. The German and Icelandic representatives, Malik Harris and Systur respectively, also showed support for Ukraine onstage after finishing their performances. These acts later displayed Ukrainian flags during the recap of the final and semi-finals, as did Lithuanian entrant Monika Liu and Georgian entrants Circus Mircus. Ukraine went on to win the contest, receiving a record 439 points from the public televote.

== 2023 contest ==
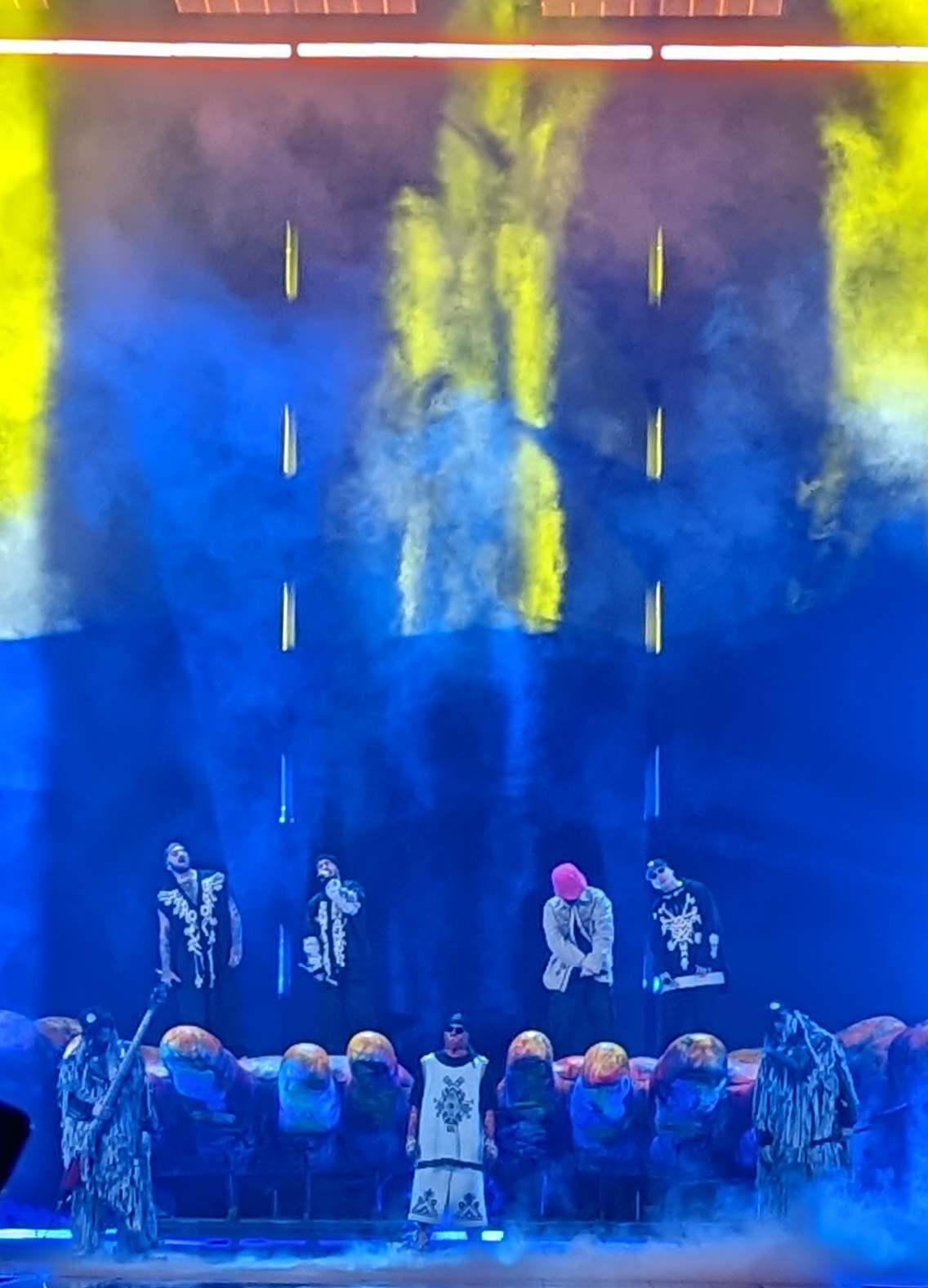
Kalush Orchestra, winners of the Eurovision Song Contest 2022 for Ukraine, performed as the opening act in the final of the 2023 contest. The 2023 event was held in the British city of Liverpool on behalf of Ukraine, which was unable to host due to the Russian invasion of the country.

Following Ukraine's win in 2022, in accordance with Eurovision tradition, the EBU initially gave Ukraine the opportunity to organise the Eurovision Song Contest 2023. However, in light of the Russian invasion, speculation was raised that the country would not be capable of hosting the event. Due to this, several countries expressed interest in hosting in the event that Ukraine could not, including Belgium, Italy, the Netherlands, Poland, Spain (which later withdrew its interest), Sweden, and the United Kingdom.

On 16 May 2022, Mykola Chernotytskyi, chairman of the Ukrainian broadcaster Suspilne, stated that it wished to host the contest in a peaceful Ukraine and hoped that the country would be able to guarantee the safety of all participants and their delegations during the event. Chernotytskyi stated on 20 May that the broadcaster would begin discussions with the EBU regarding the hosting of the contest.

Numerous Ukrainian politicians advocated for the contest to take place in Ukraine. Ukrainian president Volodymyr Zelenskyy stated that he hoped for the contest to one day take place in Mariupol. Mykola Povoroznyk, the first deputy head of the Kyiv City State Administration, stated on 26 May 2022 that Kyiv would be ready to host the contest if asked. Ukrainian minister of culture Oleksandr Tkachenko stated on 3 June his intention to discuss conditional changes with the EBU in order to allow the contest to be held in the country. Taras Melnychuk, representative of the Ukrainian government for the Verkhovna Rada, stated on 10 June that a committee was formed to aid the organisation of the event.

On 16 June 2022, Suspilne and the Ukrainian government held a meeting with the EBU to discuss potential hosting options in Ukraine. At the meeting, Suspilne proposed Lviv, Zakarpattia and Kyiv as potential host locations. The following day, the EBU announced that Ukraine would not be able to host the contest, following assessments with both Suspilne and third-party specialists, and that discussions would begin with the BBC for potentially hosting in the United Kingdom, which had finished in second place in the 2022 contest. In response, Chernotytskyi and Tkachenko, alongside former Ukrainian Eurovision winners Ruslana, Jamala and Oleh Psiuk of Kalush Orchestra, issued a joint statement requesting further talks with the EBU on hosting the event in Ukraine. A follow-up statement from the EBU on 23 June reaffirmed its decision to not host the event in Ukraine, highlighting the security considerations for doing so while also urging for the process of choosing the host country to not be politicised. On 25 July 2022, the United Kingdom was confirmed as the host country of the 2023 contest, with Suspilne working with the BBC to develop and implement Ukrainian elements for the live shows, and Ukraine being granted automatic qualification for the final.

Ahead of the final on 13 May 2023, Tkachenko requested that the EBU allow Zelenskyy to address the audience via a pre-recorded message. This was rejected on the basis of the EBU's wish to "not politicize the event". Minutes before the Ukrainian representatives Tvorchi went on stage to perform their entry "Heart of Steel", Russian forces launched missile strikes against their hometown Ternopil. During the recap, the duo held up a makeshift sign with 'Ternopil' written on it.

== 2026 contest ==
On 15 May 2026, the day before the final of the 2026 contest, British journalist Pablo O'Hana asked Martin Green, director of the Eurovision Song Contest, on whether Russia could be allowed back whilst the invasion of Ukraine continued. Green responded by saying that Russia could "theoretically" be permitted again if the Russian broadcasters were able to demonstrate their independence from the government, and that the EBU does not automatically exclude countries involved in wars, adding that doing so would mean "getting into really difficult territory of making very subjective value judgements". O'Hana pointed out that this contradicted the EBU's statement from 2022.

Green's comments were widely viewed as undermining the perception that the EBU's exclusion of Russia constituted a clear stance against the invasion of Ukraine, drawing criticism from fans and several UK politicians. Liberal Democrat MP Tom Gordon described the admission as a "stunning, jaw-dropping" act of "moral cowardice", and announced plans to submit a parliamentary motion condemning the comments, which he did on 4 June. Labour MP Josh Newbury said Green had "demolished his own argument with a two-word response", adding that "the EBU is making it up as it goes along, and the BBC – a public broadcaster accountable to this country – is sitting at that table nodding along. That has to change". Shadow Culture Secretary and Conservative MP Nigel Huddleston said, "Eurovision brings nations together through creative competition, underpinned by the principle of international cooperation. Russia stands completely against that principle". The chairman of Spanish broadcaster RTVE, José Pablo López, said that Green's comments were related to the controversy surrounding Israel's continued participation in the contest amidst the Gaza war, claiming that Green was trying to justify the EBU's "double standards". Green later clarified that there were no active plans or discussions for Russia to return. Russian foreign minister Sergey Lavrov stated a few days later that the country would not return even if given the opportunity, claiming the event had become "satanic", and that Russia's focus would shift to its revival of the Intervision Song Contest.

== Voting history ==
The two nations have exchanged points with each other despite their unstable relations. The tables below show the points awarded between Russia and Ukraine since the latter debuted in the Eurovision Song Contest 2003.

Key

- SF – Semi-final
- F – Final
- T – Televote
- J – Jury vote

Russia to Ukraine
Points	Total	Years
12 points	2	2004^{(F)}; 2021^{(TSF)}
10 points	5	2006^{(SF)}; 2006^{(F)}; 2011^{(F)}; 2016^{(TF)}; 2018^{(TSF)}
8 points	5	2003^{(F)}; 2007^{(F)}; 2008^{(F)}; 2012^{(F)}; 2018^{(TF)}
7 points	6	2009^{(SF)}; 2010^{(F)}; 2013^{(SF)}; 2014^{(SF)}; 2014^{(F)}; 2021^{(TF)}
6 points	1	2018^{(JSF)}
5 points	1	2021^{(JSF)}
4 points	0	
3 points	0	
2 points	2	2005^{(F)}; 2009^{(F)}
1 point	1	2013^{(F)}
0 points	3	2016^{(JF)}; 2018^{(JF)}; 2021^{(JF)}
Total:	172 points	

Ukraine to Russia
Points	Total	Years
12 points	5	2003^{(F)}; 2006^{(SF)}; 2006^{(F)}; 2008^{(F)}; 2016^{(TF)}
10 points	4	2004^{(F)}; 2007^{(F)}; 2010^{(F)}; 2012^{(F)}
8 points	2	2009^{(F)}; 2011^{(F)}
7 points	1	2013^{(SF)}
6 points	2	2014^{(SF)}; 2021^{(TSF)}
5 points	0	
4 points	4	2005^{(F)}; 2013^{(F)}; 2014^{(F)}; 2021^{(TF)}
3 points	1	2018^{(TSF)}
2 points	0	
1 point	0	
0 points	4	2016^{(JF)}; 2018^{(JSF)}; 2021^{(JSF)}; 2021^{(JF)}
Total:	154 points	

== See also ==
- Russia–Ukraine relations
- Armenia–Azerbaijan relations in the Eurovision Song Contest
