= Ukraine in the Eurovision Song Contest 2019 =

- Eurovision Song Contest 2019
- Participating broadcaster: Public Broadcasting Company of Ukraine (UA:PBC)
- Country: Ukraine
- Selection process: Vidbir 2019
- Selection date: 23 February 2019

Placement
- Semi-final result: Withdrawn

Participation chronology

Ukraine was set to be represented at the Eurovision Song Contest 2019. The Ukrainian participating broadcaster, Public Broadcasting Company of Ukraine (UA:PBC), organised the national final Vidbir 2019, in collaboration with commercial broadcaster STB, in order to select its entry for the contest. The winner of Vidbir was the song "Siren Song", written by Hanna Korsun and Mikhail Busin, and performed by Korsun herself under her stage name Maruv. However, UA:PBC announced its withdrawal from the contest after Maruv refused to sign her participation agreement, and following failed attempts to internally select a representative from the other competing artists in the national final.

The national selection consisted of two semi-finals, held on 9 and 16 February 2019, and a final, held on 23 February 2019; eight entries competed in each semi-final with the top three from each semi-final advancing to the final. The winner was selected following the combination of votes from a three-member jury panel and a public televote. Ukraine was drawn to compete in the first semi-final of the Eurovision Song Contest which took place on 14 May 2019.

== Background ==
Prior to the 2019 contest, the National Television Company of Ukraine (NTU) until 2016, and Public Broadcasting Company of Ukraine (UA:PBC) since 2017, had participated in the Eurovision Song Contest fifteen times since NTU's first entry in 2003. They won in 2004 with the song "Wild Dances" performed by Ruslana and in 2016 with the song "1944" performed by Jamala. Following the introduction of semi-finals in 2004, Ukraine had managed to qualify to final in every contest they participated in thus far. Ukraine had been the runner-up in the contest on two occasions: in 2007 with the song "Dancing Lasha Tumbai" performed by Verka Serduchka and in 2008 with the song "Shady Lady" performed by Ani Lorak. Their least successful result had been 24th place, achieved in 2017, with the song "Time" performed by O.Torvald.

As part of its duties as participating broadcaster, UA:PBC organises the selection of its entry in the Eurovision Song Contest and broadcasts the event in the country. UA:PBC confirmed its intentions to participate at the 2019 contest on 24 September 2018. In the past, the Ukrainian broadcaster had alternated between both internal selections and national finals in order to select its entry. Since 2016, in collaboration with commercial broadcaster STB, it had set up national finals with several artists to choose both the song and performer to compete at Eurovision for Ukraine, with both the public and a panel of jury members involved in the selection. UA:PBC's collaboration with STB would have continued into 2021.

== Before Eurovision ==
=== Vidbir 2019 ===
Vidbir 2019 was the fourth edition of Vidbir which selected the Ukrainian entry for the Eurovision Song Contest 2019. The competition took place at the Palace of Culture "KPI" in Kyiv and consisted of two semi-finals held on 9 and 16 February 2019 and a final on 23 February 2019. All shows in the competition were hosted by Serhiy Prytula and broadcast on UA:Pershyi, UA:Kultura, UA:Krym and STB as well as online via UA:PBC and STB's YouTube broadcasts. The final was also broadcast via radio on UA:Radio Promin.

==== Format ====
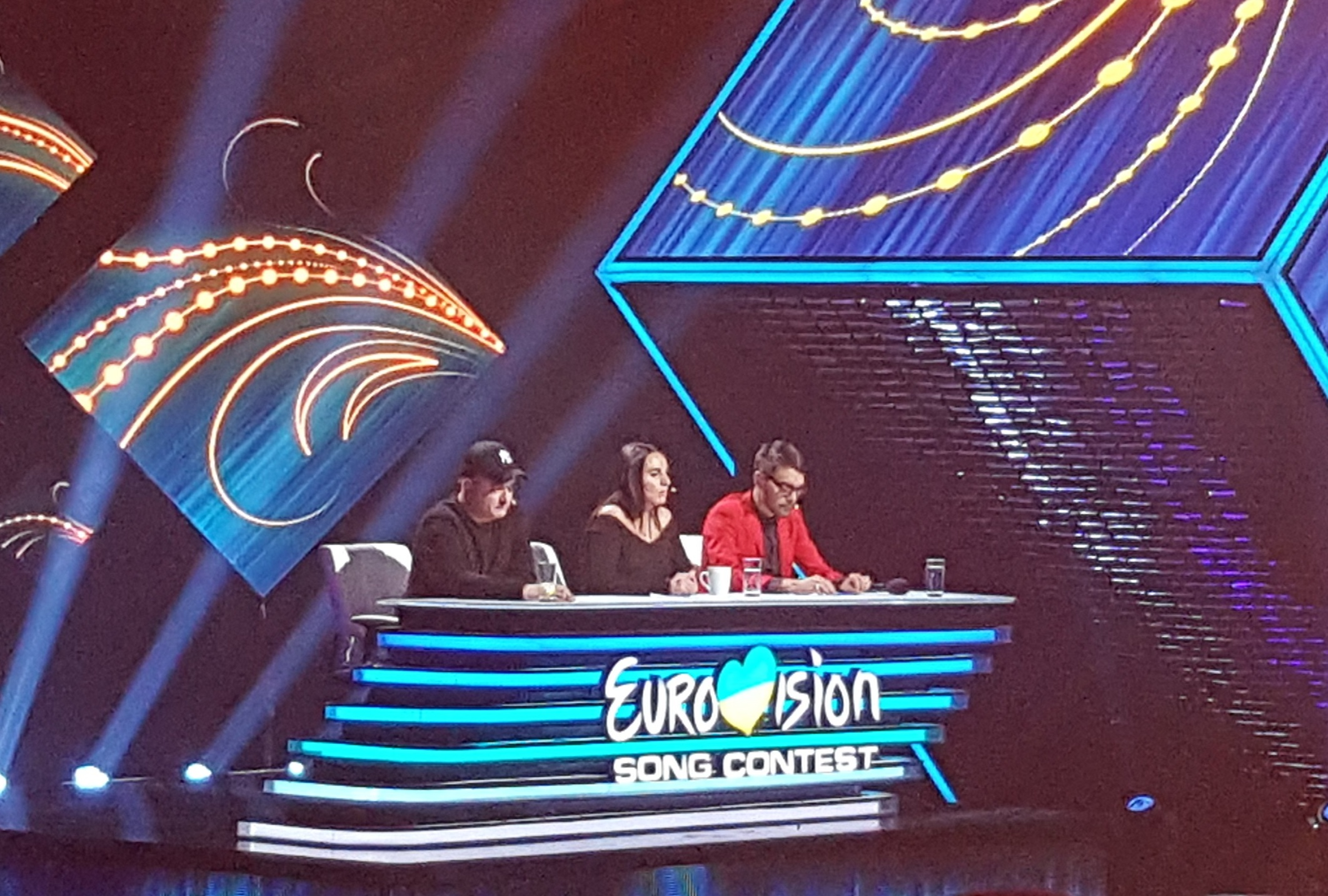
The Vidbir 2019 judges: Andriy Danylko, Jamala and Yevhen Filatov

The selection of the competing entries for the national final and ultimately the Ukrainian Eurovision entry took place over three stages. In the first stage, artists and songwriters had the opportunity to apply for the competition through an online submission form. Sixteen acts were selected and announced on 9 January 2019. The second stage consisted of the televised semi-finals which took place on 9 and 16 February 2019 with eight acts competing in each show. Three acts were selected to advance from each semi-final based on the 50/50 combination of votes from a public televote and an expert jury. Both the public televote and the expert jury assigned scores ranging from 1 (lowest) to 8 (highest) and the three entries that had the highest number of points following the combination of these scores advanced to the final. The third stage was the final, which took place on 23 February 2019 and featured the six acts that qualified from the semi-finals vying to represent Ukraine in Tel Aviv. The winner was selected via the 50/50 combination of votes from a public televote and an expert jury. Both the public televote and the expert jury assigned scores ranging from 1 (lowest) to 6 (highest) and the entry that had the highest number of points following the combination of these scores was declared the winner. Viewers participating in the public televote during the three live shows had the opportunity to submit a single vote per phone number for each of the participating entries via SMS or the Teleportal mobile application. In the event of a tie during the semi-finals and final, the tie was decided in favour of the entry that received the highest score from the public televote.

The jury panel that voted during the three shows consisted of:

- Andriy Danylko – comedian and singer, represented Ukraine in 2007 as the drag artist Verka Serduchka
- Jamala – singer-songwriter, winner of Eurovision for Ukraine in 2016
- Yevhen Filatov (The Maneken) – singer and producer, creator of group Onuka

==== Competing entries ====
Artists and composers had the opportunity to submit their entries via an online submission form which accepted entries between 20 October 2018 and 25 December 2018. Composer and producer Ruslan Kvinta was assigned as the music producer of the show and was the lead in reviewing the 860 received submissions and shortlisting entries to compete in the national final. On 9 January 2019, the sixteen selected competing acts were announced. On 22 January 2019, it was announced that "Ochi", written by Tetiana Reshetniak and Vitaliy Telezin and to have been performed by Tayanna, was withdrawn from the competition and replaced by the song "Siren Song" performed by Maruv. The sixteen acts were allocated to one of two semi-finals during a draw that took place on 22 January, which was hosted by Ruslan Kvinta.

Artist	Song	Songwriter(s)
Anna Maria	"My Road"	Anna Opanasiuk, Maria Opanasiuk, Ivan Rozin
Bahroma	"Nazavzhdy-navsegda" (Назавжди-навсегда)	Roman Bakhariev, Oleksiy Kryvosheyev
Braii	"Maybe"	Oleksiy Kryvosheyev, Oksana Bryzhalova
Brunettes Shoot Blondes	"Houston"	Andriy Kovaliov
Freedom Jazz	"Cupidon"	Oleksandra Zhurba
Ivan Navi	"All for the Love"	Ivan Siarkevych, Yana Kovaliova, Andriy Lemishka
Kazka	"Apart"	Ruslan Akhrymenko, Yevhen Matyushenko
Khayat	"Ever"	Andriy Khayat
Kira Mazur	"Dykhaty" (Дихати)	Olena Mazur
Laud	"2 dni" (2 дні)	Ivan Klymenko, Stanislav Chornyi
Letay	"Myla moya" (Мила моя)	Illia Reznikov, Ivan Rozin
Maruv	"Siren Song"	Hanna Korsun, Mikhail Busin
The Hypnotunez	"Hey"	Gera Louidze, Yuriy Bikbaev, Timur Akhtamov, Sergey Suzdalcev, Anton Gnatenko, Vladimir Linnyk
TseSho	"Hate"	Igor Mytalnykov, Katrysa Petrashova, Marichka Shtyrbulova, Marysia Ionova, Nadezhda Golubtsova
Vera Kekelia	"Wow!"	Roman Duda, Vira Kekelia
Yuko	"Halyna huliala" (Галина гуляла)	Stanislav Koroliov, Yulia Yurina

==== Semi-finals ====
The two semi-finals took place on 9 and 16 February 2019. In each semi-final eight acts competed and the top three entries determined following the combination of votes from a public televote and an expert jury advanced to the final of the competition, while the remaining five entries were eliminated. In addition to the performances of the competing entries, Mélovin, who represented Ukraine in 2018, performed the song "Z toboyu, zi mnoyu, i hodi" as a guest in the first semi-final, while Lake Malawi, who would represent the Czech Republic in 2019, performed their Eurovision entry "Friend of a Friend" as a guest in the second semi-final.

Semi-final 1 – 9 February 2019
R/O	Artist	Song	Jury	Televote		Total	Place
R/O	Artist	Song	Jury	Percentage	Points	Total	Place
1	The Hypnotunez	"Hey"	1	5.33%	1	2	8
2	Letay	"Myla moya"	2	10.42%	3	5	7
3	Vera Kekelia	"Wow!"	4	7.86%	2	6	6
4	Tsesho	"Hate"	5	13.78%	6	11	4
5	Yuko	"Halyna huliala"	8	13.39%	5	13	3
6	Maruv	"Siren Song"	6	22.64%	8	14	1
7	Brunettes Shoot Blondes	"Houston"	7	15.44%	7	14	2
8	Bahroma	"Nazavzhdy-navsegda"	3	11.15%	4	7	5

Detailed Jury Votes
R/O	Song	A. Danylko	Jamala	Y. Filatov	Total	Points
1	"Hey"	1	1	1	3	1
2	"Myla moya"	3	3	3	9	2
3	"Wow!"	4	4	2	10	4
4	"Hate"	5	6	5	16	5
5	"Halyna huliala"	6	8	8	22	8
6	"Siren Song"	8	5	4	17	6
7	"Houston"	7	7	7	21	7
8	"Nazavzhdy-navsegda"	2	2	6	10	3

Semi-final 2 – 16 February 2019
R/O	Artist	Song	Jury	Televote		Total	Place
R/O	Artist	Song	Jury	Percentage	Points	Total	Place
1	Ivan Navi	"All for the Love"	4	11.64%	4	8	6
2	Anna Maria	"My Road"	5	16.73%	7	12	2
3	Kazka	"Apart"	7	13.44%	5	12	3
4	Kira Mazur	"Dykhaty"	1	4.05%	1	2	8
5	Laud	"2 dni"	6	8.11%	3	9	4
6	Khayat	"Ever"	2	14.63%	6	8	5
7	Braii	"Maybe"	3	5.76%	2	5	7
8	Freedom Jazz	"Cupidon"	8	25.64%	8	16	1

Detailed Jury Votes
R/O	Song	A. Danylko	Jamala	Y. Filatov	Total	Points
1	"All for the Love"	3	4	4	11	4
2	"My Road"	4	5	7	16	5
3	"Apart"	8	7	5	20	7
4	"Dykhaty"	1	1	1	3	1
5	"2 dni"	5	6	6	17	6
6	"Ever"	2	2	3	7	2
7	"Maybe"	6	3	2	11	3
8	"Cupidon"	7	8	8	23	8

==== Final ====
The final took place on 23 February 2019. The six entries that qualified from the semi-finals competed. The winner, "Siren Song" performed by Maruv, was selected through the combination of votes from a public televote and an expert jury. Ties were decided in favour of the entries that received higher scores from the public televote. In addition to the performances of the competing entries, guests included jury member Jamala performing the song "Solo", and Bilal Hassani, who would represent France in 2019, performing his Eurovision entry "Roi".

Final – 23 February 2019
R/O	Artist	Song	Jury	Televote	Total	Place
1	Freedom Jazz	"Cupidon"	6	4	10	2
2	Yuko	"Halyna huliala"	4	1	5	5
3	Maruv	"Siren Song"	5	6	11	1
4	Brunettes Shoot Blondes	"Houston"	2	3	5	4
5	Kazka	"Apart"	3	5	8	3
6	Anna Maria	"My Road"	1	2	3	6

Detailed Jury Votes
R/O	Song	A. Danylko	Jamala	Y. Filatov	Total	Points
1	"Cupidon"	4	6	6	16	6
2	"Halyna huliala"	3	5	4	12	4
3	"Siren Song"	6	4	5	15	5
4	"Houston"	2	3	2	7	2
5	"Apart"	5	2	3	10	3
6	"My Road"	1	1	1	3	1

==== Controversy ====
During the final of Vidbir 2019, it was announced that UA:PBC had reserved the right to change the decision made by the jury and Ukrainian public. Following Maruv's victory, it was reported that the broadcaster had sent her management a contract, requiring Maruv to delay all upcoming appearances and performances in Russia in order to become the Ukrainian representative; it is considered controversial for Ukrainian artists to tour in Russia following the 2014 Russian military intervention in Ukraine. After it became clear that she would be performing in two concerts in Russia the following months, Vice Prime Minister and Minister of Culture Vyacheslav Kyrylenko stated that artists who toured in Russia or "did not recognise the territorial integrity of Ukraine" should not take part in Eurovision. She was also given 48 hours to sign the contract or be replaced. The day afterwards, Maruv revealed that the broadcaster's contract had additionally banned her from improvising on stage and communicating with any journalist without the permission of the broadcaster, and required her to fully comply with any requests from the broadcaster. If she were to not follow any of these clauses, she would be fined ₴2 million (~€67,000). Maruv also stated that the broadcaster would not give her any financial compensation for the competition and would not pay for the trip to Tel Aviv.

On 25 February, both Maruv and the broadcaster confirmed that she would not represent Ukraine in Israel due to disputes within the contract, and that another act would be chosen. National final runner-up Freedom Jazz announced on 26 February that they had rejected the broadcaster's offer to represent Ukraine as well, with third-place finisher Kazka confirming they had rejected the offer as well the following day.

== Withdrawal ==
On 27 February, UA:PBC announced its withdrawal from the contest, due to the inability to select a representative among other competing artists in the national final. Despite this, UA:PBC broadcast the contest in Ukraine.
