= Khayat (singer) =

Ukrainian singer

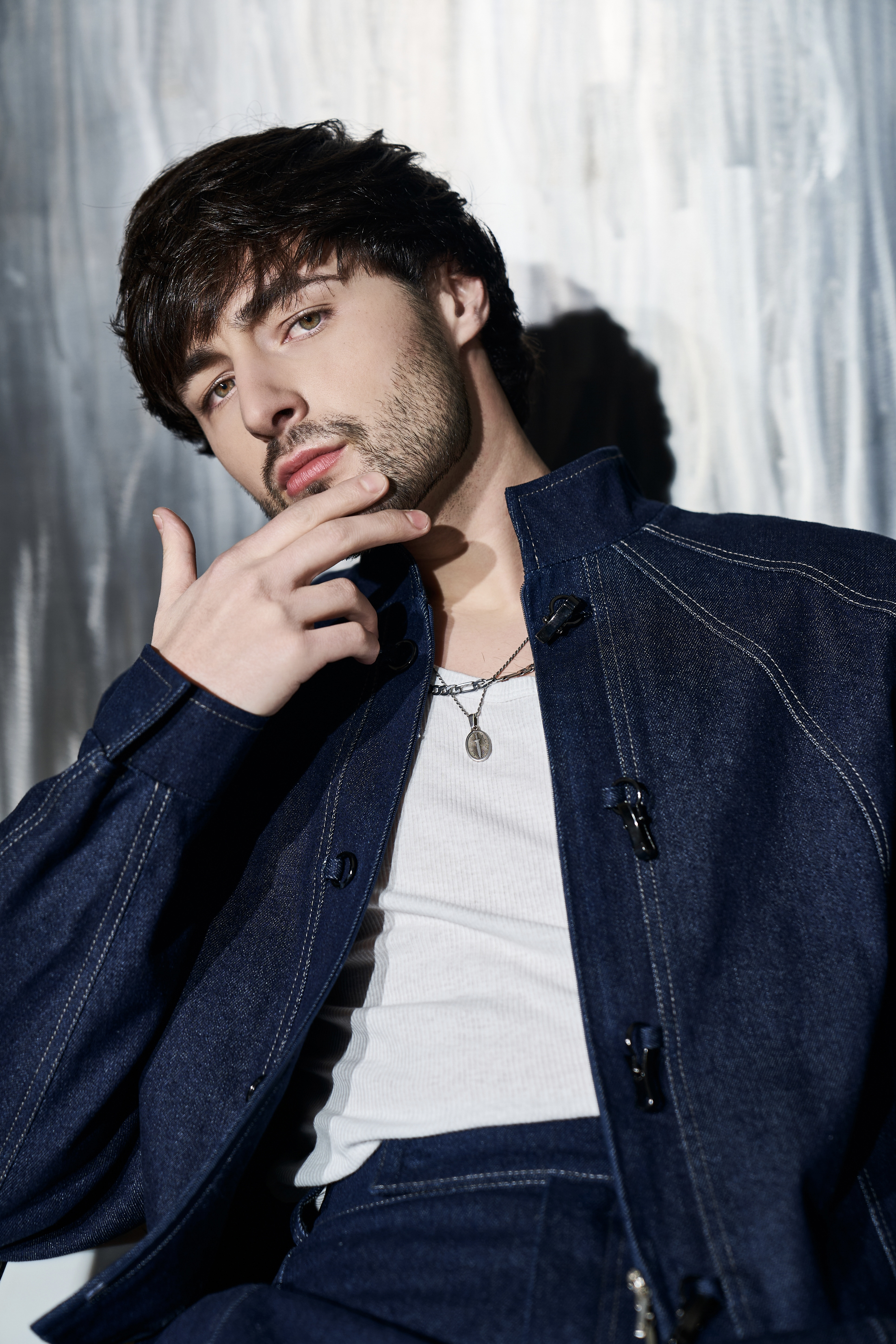

Background information
- Born: Andrii Oleksandrovych Skalkovich; 3 April 1997 (age 29); Znamianka, Kirovohrad Oblast, Ukraine
- Genres: Folktronica
- Occupations: Singer, songwriter
- Instruments: Vocals, accordion
- Years active: 2018–present
- Labels: Masterskaya, ENKO (2026-)

Andrii Oleksandrovych Khaiat (Ukrainian: Андрій Олександрович Хайат; born Skalkovich; 3 April 1997), known professionally as Khayat (stylized in all caps), is a Ukrainian singer and songwriter of Palestinian origin. He writes his own songs which are usually in Ukrainian or English. He also speaks Arabic which he studied along with English at university. He plays the accordion. His music style is described as folktronica, neo-pop or ethno-techno, a combination of indie-pop and electronic music with ethnic and folk motives.

== Holos Krainy and Vidbir ==
In 2019 he took part in the 9th season of "Holos Krainy", the Ukrainian version of The Voice. He was coached by Tina Karol and came third overall.

He has repeatedly taken part in Vidbir, the national selection of the Ukrainian representative at the Eurovision Song Contest. He has said that participation is beneficial because he considers Eurovision to be the biggest platform for a Ukrainian musician today. He sees Eurovision to also be open to alternative, experimental music. In 2019 he competed with the song "Ever" in Semi-final 2. He received the 3rd highest amount of points from the public but was placed second-to-last by the jury, and so didn't proceed to the final. He finished in the 2nd place in both the semi-final and the final of Vidbir 2020 with the song "Call for Love". In the 2025 edition of the same competition, he competed with the song "Honor". The song which is sung in English and Ukrainian was partly inspired by the Russian shelling of Okhmatdyt, children's hospital in Kyiv. In an interview, Khayat said that he had performed there shortly before the tragedy and he was also nearby during the attack. Hearing the explosions affected him greatly. It is reflected in the second verse of Honor. He received the highest amount of points by the jury but only came in 4th in the televote. Overall, he tied for second place with two other entries, but the rules dictate that in case of a tie the televotes decide. Therefore, he placed 4th. In 2026, he became part of the Vidbir line-up by winning the wildcard vote having received over 32% of votes. He has said that this year's participation was spontaneous as he submitted the application on the second-to-last day. His performance of the song "Герци" (Hertsy) came in 6th in the jury vote, 4th in the televote, and 5th overall.

== Music style ==
Khayat's voice has been described as specific and mesmerizing as well as a unique, soulful and penetrating timbre that makes listeners "tingle". Khayat himself has said that his ethnic identity is an important component of his music because his voice, which he considers to be the main element of his ethnic music, has been passed down to him from his great-great-grandparents and he has ethnic elements in his blood.

His first album Khmil' was noted for the blend of modern and traditional music as well as both ordinary and uncommon sounds. He mixes electronic and indie-pop music with traditional folk instruments, such as duduk and Tibetan standing bell. His songs feature ordinary sounds, such as a car engine. They were praised for their fusion of "the future and the past of music." The website CultureFix described his single "Темно" (Darkness) as "a moody electronic folk anthem with synth and acoustic production combining to produce an enchanting, ethereal soundscape." and his single "Honor" as "a thrilling moody electronic anthem".

His second EP "Ultra II" had to be postponed due to the invasion of the Russian army into Ukraine. Before its eventual release, Khayat decided to change some of the songs because he wanted them to stay relevant to his current state of mind stating: "My music changes, grows with me, and I think it's beautiful." In a 2025 interview, he stated that he tries his best to contribute to the spread of Ukrainian culture which Ukrainians are full of and which, he believes, should aim to set new trends and strive for high artistic levels. Many of his newer songs are inspired by the war and he has also performed for the Ukrainian military. He has described his feelings of responsibility to bring positive emotions and energy to the defendants who see the true face of war and who need to be motivated. In 2026 he said that music written during the war is a mirror of its time and will serve as a reminder of what Ukrainians lived through even after the war ends. He said that the most personal song from the album is "Дворами" ("[Through the] Courtyards") which tells an intimate story and which he rarely ever performs live because it is too emotional for him.

He has said that in 2019 he turned down collaboration offers from Russian producers even though they were big opportunities. His decision was influenced by the political situation as this was after the annexation of Crimea as well as a fear of losing creativity. He said that he needs to live in Ukraine, not abroad, when writing songs about Ukraine and even more so now, during the war.

== Personal life ==
Khayat has described himself as an introvert in terms of communication who, however, doesn't mind having large crowds around him. He has described his personality as a principled person who doesn't look for shortcuts and who can be very stubborn, speaks his mind and sometimes finds it hard to compromise. He has listed his grandfather as an important figure in his life and probably the only person who truly believed in his dream to be a musician.

At 15 years old he spent a year in the USA as part of the FLEX program. However, his foster family was extremely religious and domineering and the foster mother later turned out to have a criminal record. Khayat was forced to go to church, do chores, memorize prayers and say them before meals. He wasn't allowed to eat until he pronounced every word of the prayer correctly and would be locked in his room if he refused to go to church. Eventually, Khayat contacted the agency and was recovered and moved to another foster family by the police.

As an adult, Khayat officially changed his name from Skalkovich (Скалкович) to Khaiat (Хайат) which is the surname of his stepfather whose family he felt part of.

His hobbies outside of music include cooking.

== Discography ==
=== Album ===
- «Khmil'» (2019)

=== EP ===
- «Ultra» (2021)
- «Ultra II» (2023)

=== Singles ===
- «Devochka» (2018)
- «Ясно» (2018)
- «Ever» (2019)
- «Vesnianka» (2019)
- «Osoka» (2019)
- «Сall for Love» (2020)
- «Говорила» (2020)
- «Темно» (2020)
- «Крок» (2021)
- «Рубікон» (2024)
- «Balamut» (2025)
- «Honor» (2025)
- «Герци» (2026)

Khayat has collaborated with multiple other artists on song, notably with YUKO («Vesnianka», 2019) Roxolana («Тану», 2023) whom Khayat had also joined during her tour for several performances.

== Awards and nominations ==
| Award | Year | Nominated work | Result |
|---|---|---|---|
| Ukrainian song of the year | 2020 | song "Osoka" | Won |
| 9th Yearly Ukrainian National Awards (YUNA) | 2020 | Discovery of the year | Nominated |
| 10th Yearly Ukrainian National Awards (YUNA) | 2021 | Best performer | Nominated |
