= Tayanna =

Ukrainian singer, actress and composer (born 1984)

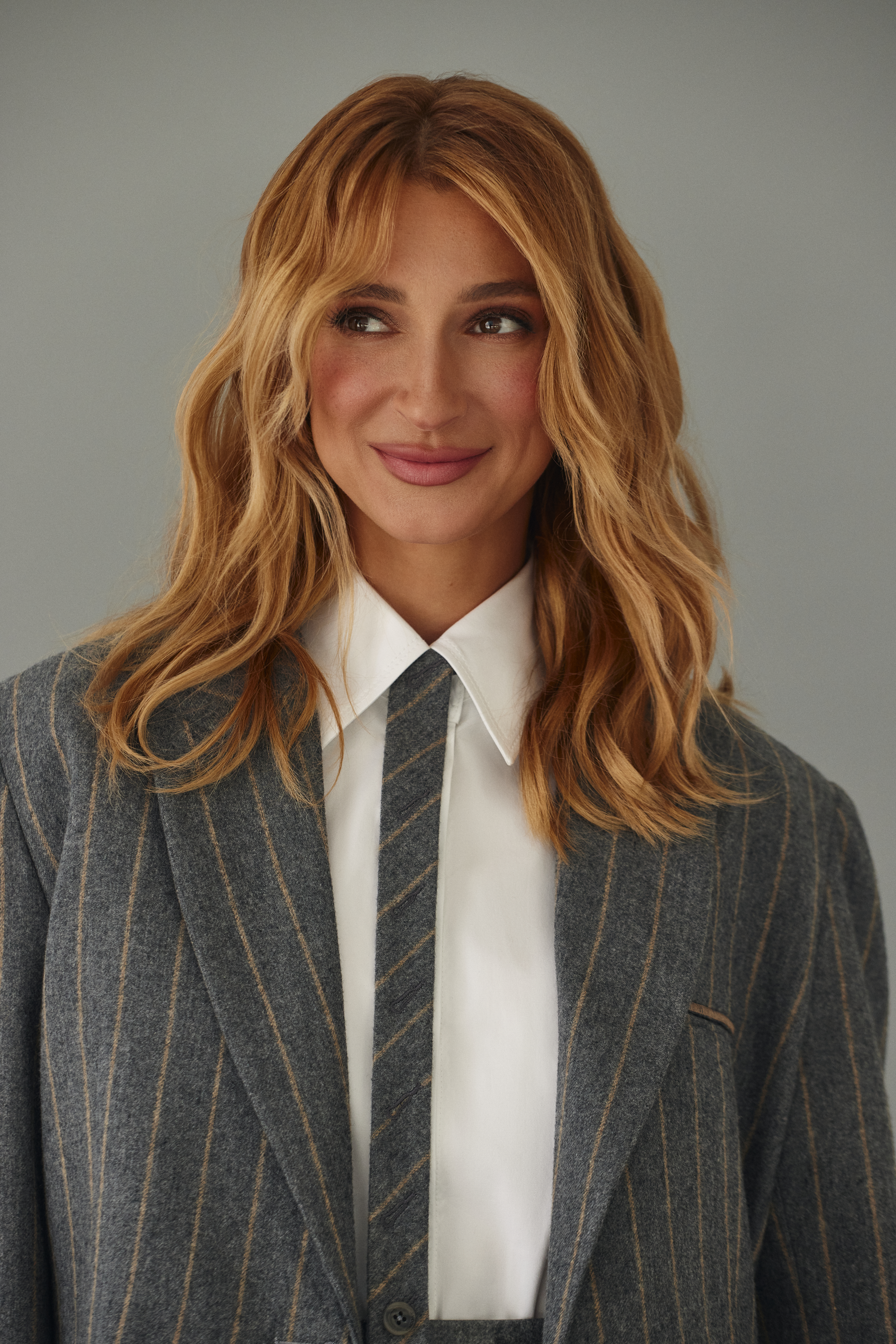
- Tayanna in 2022

Background information
- Also known as: Tetiana Reshetniak; Tyana
- Born: Tetiana Mykhailivna Reshetniak; 29 September 1984 (age 41); Chernivtsi, Ukrainian SSR
- Genres: Pop; pop-rock; soft rock; folk rock; electro
- Occupations: Singer; actress; composer
- Years active: 2006–present
- Labels: Moon Records; Media Land; Best Music

Tetiana Mykhailivna Reshetniak (Ukrainian: Тетяна Михайлівна Решетняк, born 29 September 1984), known professionally as Tayanna (stylised in all caps), is a Ukrainian singer, actress, and composer.

== Early life ==
Tetiana Mykhailivna Reshetniak was born on 29 September 1984 in Chernivtsi to parents Mikhail and Natalia. She has three brothers: two twins, who are confectioners (one of them working also as a singer), and Mikhail (better known as Misha Marvin).

At eight years old, her parents urged her to attend accordion class in a music school but she left the school about a year later. She would later begin studying vocals, firstly in an ensemble, then through individual lessons. In 2001, during a visit to Lviv, Tatyana had the opportunity to perform ensemble before the Pope John Paul II's appearance. The first significant event for her was a trip to Skadovsk for the Black Sea Games, where she took the third place in the simultaneous music festival.

== Career ==
=== 2008–2011: Hot Chocolate ===
In 2008, Tatyana became member of the girl group Hot Chocolate (Ukrainian: Гарячий шоколад, romanized: Hariachnyi shokolad). In 2011, the group's producer, Dmytro Klimashenko, removed her from the group and made her pay a large fee after she broke off their affair.

=== 2014–2016: Holos Krainy ===
In 2014, Reshetniak took part in the blind audition round of the fourth season of the Ukrainian version of The Voice, Holos Krainy, where none of the coaches turned their chairs for her. In the summer of the same year, she released her music video for the song "Znayu i vyeryu".

In 2015, she returned to Holos Krainy, with all four coaches turning their chairs for her during the blind auditions, where she performed Sofia Rotaru's rendition of the traditional Ukrainian song "Krai, mii ridnyi krai". She chose Potap as her coach and eventually advanced to the superfinal, where she placed second.

=== 2017–present ===
In 2017, Tayanna competed in Vidbir 2017, the Ukrainian national selection for the Eurovision Song Contest 2017, with the song "I Love You". She placed second in the final after losing the tiebreak with the winners, O.Torvald. On 17 November 2017, she released her second album Trymai mene, in collaboration with the producer Alan Badoev. The album consisted of seven tracks in Ukrainian. In December 2017, Tayanna with the song "Shkoda" performed in the annual M1 Music Awards and she won the Breakthrough of the Year award.

In 2018, she competed Vidbir 2018, the Ukrainian national selection for the Eurovision Song Contest 2018, with the song "Lelia". Despite being a favourite to win, she placed second in the selection for the second year in a row. She toured Ukraine in the spring of 2018, and on 19 May 2018, she attended the Golden Firebird Awards, where she won the Clip of the Year and Singer of the Year awards. On 10 December, she was a special guest in the Women of the Third Millenium Awards, where she premiered her song "Fantastychna zhinka" and received the Rating award.

In 2019, she was set to compete in Vidbir 2019 with the song "Ochi", but she withdrew from the selection in 22 January; her competing song would still go on to be released on 8 October. In 2021, she was the spokesperson who announced the Ukrainian jury's votes in the final of the Eurovision Song Contest 2021.

== Private life ==
At 18 years old, she began an affair with producer Dmytro Klimashenko, which lasted until 2011. In 2013, she gave birth to a son named Daniel.

== Discography ==
=== Studio albums ===
- 9 pyesen iz zhyzni (2016)
- Trymai mene (2017)

=== EPs ===
- Tayanna. Portrety (2016)

=== Singles ===
- "Ya ili ona" (2014)
- "Tolko ty" (2014)
- "Samolyoty" (2014)
- "Obnimi" (2014)
- "Lyubovi bolshe net" (2014)
- "Znayu i vyeryu" (2014)
- "Zabud" (2014)
- "Yesli ty zdyosh" (2014)
- "Dyshym" (2014)
- "Pretty Lie" (with Lavika) (2014)
- "I Am the One" (2014)
- "Da!" (2015)
- "9 zhyznyey" (2015)
- "Osen" (2016)
- "I Love You" (2017)
- "Shkoda" (2017)
- "Kvitka" (2017)
- "Lelia" (2018)
- "Fantastychna zhinka" (2018)
- "Ochi" (2019)
- "Yak plakala vona" (2019)
- "Murashki" (2019)
- "Eiforiia" (2020)
- "Zhinocha syla" (2020)
- "Plachu i smiiusia" (2020)
- "Vyidy na svitlo" (2020)
- "100 dniv" (2020)
