= Kazka =

Ukrainian pop band

KAZKA
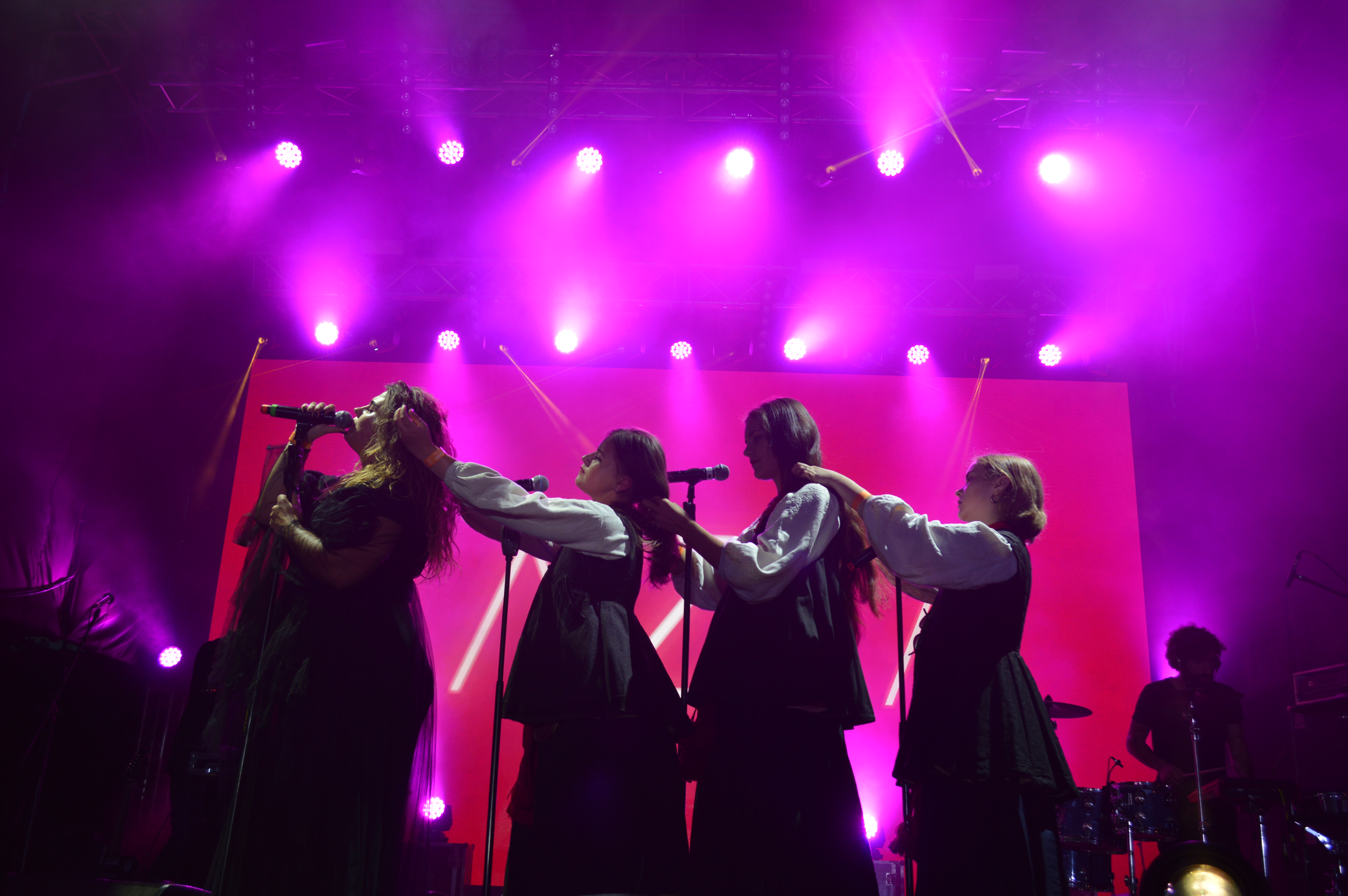
- Kazka performing in 2018

Background information
- Origin: Kyiv, Ukraine
- Genres: pop; experimental pop; electropop; folk
- Years active: 2017–present
- Label: Mamamusic
- Members: Oleksandra Zaritska (vocals); Nikita Budash (keyboard and guitar); Dmytro Mazuriak
- Website: kazka.band

Kazka (stylized in all caps "KAZKA"; Ukrainian: Казка, lit. 'Fairy tale') is a Ukrainian band that performs pop with elements of electro-folk. Since its creation in 2017, vocalist Oleksandra Zaritska, sopilka player Dmytro Mazuriak and multi-instrumentalist Nikita Budash have become a "breakthrough of the year".

The group's producer and manager is Yuriy Nikitin and the company Mamamusic.

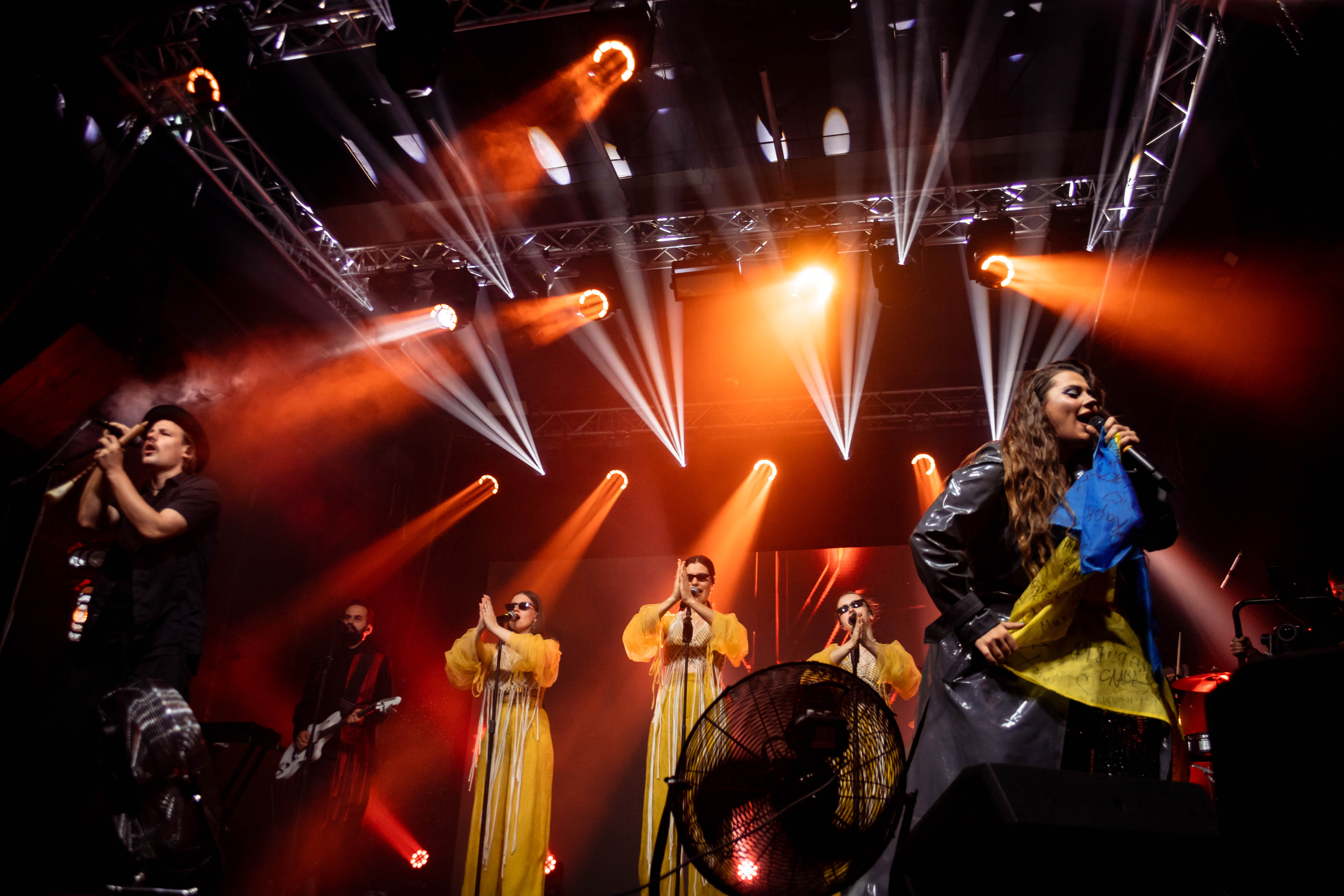
Kazka at the Ukrainian Song Project 2022 in Gdańsk, Poland

== Band history ==
Kazka emerged on March 1, 2017, with their debut release "Sviata" (Свята, transl. Holy), which immediately became a hit in Ukraine. Initially, the band consisted of vocalist Oleksandra Zaritska and multi-instrumentalist Nikita Budash (guitar, keyboard), who also works on arrangement and sound engineering. "Sviata" was also the band's debut video. Serhii Tkachenko directed the video, which is a minimalist work in red shades, featuring the band members and a number of ancient Slavic symbols (Dazhbog, the Star of the Virgin Lada, Zervan, Koliada, the Star of Herest, Bilobog and others).

=== Participation in X-Factor ===
In 2017 the band participated in the casting for Ukraine's X-Factor 8 with their song "Sviata". Andrii Danylko was the band's mentor. Following the results of the viewer voting, the band left the show on the 5th episode. Right after leaving the show, Kazka released the second single "Dyva" (Дива, transl. Miracles), which on the day of its premiere topped the iTunes chart.

At the end of the year, the band was named "Best Debut of the Year" by online magazine Karabas Live.

In the beginning of 2018, Dmytro Mazuryak, who plays more than 30 wind instruments, joined the band. On January 6, it became known that the band would take part in the national selection for the Eurovision Song Contest. On February 10, Kazka performed in the first semi-final of the selection with the song "Dyva". According to the results of the viewer voting and the jury, Kazka finished sixth and failed to reach the finals.

=== Karma ===
On April 27, 2018, the band's debut album Karma (Карма) was released online. The album has ten tracks, three of which were previously released: "Sviata", "Dyva", "Sama" (Сама, transl. Alone), "Movchaty" (Мовчати, transl. To Keep Quiet) (a cover of a song by Skryabin and Iryna Bilyk), and six new tracks. The band presented the album live at their first solo show at Kyiv's Atlas Club on June 1. The single "Sviata" was named "Best Pop Band Song" and the band was recognised as "Best Debut" by national radio station Kraina FM. For the first time ever, a Ukrainian-speaking band entered the Global Shazam Top 10. Kazka achieved an absolute record among Ukrainian artists in terms of the number of views and made it to the Top 100 best videos on YouTube. The musicians have been repeatedly awarded with the title "Breakthrough of the Year" and, for the song "Plakala" (Плакала, transl. She Cried), they received the "Hit of the Year" award and featured in the rating of Ukraine's most popular tracks according to Apple Music. The band has topped the charts in numerous countries, including Ukraine, Latvia, Bulgaria, Armenia, Kazakhstan, Uzbekistan, Belarus, Russia, Colombia, and others. In the summer, Kazka participated in various Ukrainian festivals such as BeLive in Kyiv, Impulse in Kharkiv, and MRPL City in Mariupol. In the autumn, the band launched their national Karma Tour in support of the album. Drummer Ievhen Kostyts and a trio of chorists (Vasylyna Tkachuk, Daryna Salii and Yaryna Sizyk) joined them on the tour. In winter 2018 the band announced an upcoming tour of the United States and Europe in 2019.

=== "Plakala" ===
The band scored a success with the song "Plakala", that hit a couple of records among tracks across the CIS. Kazka has become the first band from the CIS to be ranked 8th in all categories and the 3rd in the world pop category of one of the most prestigious world charts Top 10 Global Shazam. Kazka has become an absolute record holder among the Ukrainian artists in the amount of views and is in Top 100 best music videos on YouTube. The "Plakala" music video has become the first Ukrainian language video to get over 200 million views on YouTube. So far it has been viewed over 411 million times therefore becoming the most viewed in Ukraine in 2018. Kazka has got the "Hit of the Year" award according to M1 Music Awards and has been mentioned in the Apple music rating of the most popular tracks in Ukraine.

Boris Barabanov, summing up the results of 2018, named the song "Plakala" one of 16 best tracks of the past year. He noted that the song became the most popular song on Russian radio stations, and that this is the first Ukrainian language song in many years, which has reached the top of Russian charts.

=== Nirvana ===
In April 2019, the band announced via its Facebook page that it was working on a second album. The album is titled Nirvana. The album was released in December 2019.

=== "Apart" and Vidbir 2019 ===
In 2019, the band competed in Vidbir 2019 to try and represent Ukraine in the Eurovision Song Contest 2019. In the second semi final that was held on 16 February 2019, they finished 2nd and qualified for the final. The final took place on 23 February 2019. They finished in 3rd place. After the winner and the runner up of the contest rejected the broadcaster's offer to represent Ukraine at Eurovision, Kazka rejected their offer as well.

=== Svit ===
On November 5, 2021, the band released their 3rd studio album Svit.

== Band members ==
- Oleksandra Zaritska — lead vocals
- Nikita Budash — keyboards, guitar
- Dmytro Mazuriak — wind instruments (2018–present)

== Discography ==
=== Studio albums ===
| Title | Details |
|---|---|
| Karma (Карма) | Released: 27 April 2018; Label: Mamamusic; Format: Digital download |
| Nirvana (Нірвана) | Released: 27 December 2019; Label: Mamamusic; Format: Digital download |
| Svit (Світ) | Released: 5 November 2021; Label: Mamamusic; Format: Digital download |

=== Singles ===
| Title | Year | Peak chart positions | | | | | | Album |
| Title | Year | BUL | EST | GRE | HUN Downloads | ROM | RUS | Album |
|---|---|---|---|---|---|---|---|---|
| "Svaiata" ("Свята") | 2017 | — | — | — | — | — | 183 | Karma |
| "Dyna" ( "Дива") | 2017 | — | — | — | — | — | 197 | Karma |
| "Sama" ("Сама") | 2018 | — | — | — | — | — | — | Karma |
| "Plakala/Cry" ("Плакала") | 2018 | 1 | 39 | 52 | 13 | 4 | 1 | Karma |
| "Apart" | 2019 | — | — | — | — | — | 228 | Non-album single |
| "Pisnya smilyvykh divchat" ("Пісня сміливих дівчат") | 2019 | — | — | — | — | — | 152 | Nirvana |
| "Poruch" ("Поруч") | 2020 | — | — | — | — | — | 69 | Світ |
| "Myata" ("М'ята") | 2021 | — | — | — | — | — | 84 | Світ |
"—" denotes a single that did not chart or was not released in that territory.

== Collaborations ==
- 2019 — Tua feat. KAZKA — "Bedingungslos"
- 2019 — KAZKA — "Plakala" [R3HAB Remix]
- 2019 — KAZKA — "Cry" [with R3HAB]
- 2021 - KAZKA - NTI Loyalty — "ATB" (KAZKA in a cooperation with NTI Loyalty and ATB retail chain created an educational project based on VR and AR technologies aimed to popularise Ukrainian music and teach children eco-friendly behaviour)
- 2022 — Gogol Bordello & KAZKA — "Take Only What You Can Carry"
- 2022 — Gogol Bordello, KAZKA & Serhiy Zhadan — "Forces of Victory"

== Charity ==
After February 24, 2022, the band participated in the GIDNA project from Future for Ukraine Charity Foundation.

== See also ==
- Pop music in Ukraine
- Ukrainian fairy tale
