= Yuko (band) =

Folk/pop/electronic group

YUKO
- Origin: Kyiv, Ukraine
- Genres: folk, pop, electronic
- Years active: 2016–2020
- Label: Masterskaya
- Members: Yulia Yurina; Stas Koroliov

YUKO was a Ukrainian group formed in Kyiv in December 16, 2016. It combined folk and contemporary music.

== Career ==
The group is a resident of the Masterskaya music label. In 2018, YUKO began to feature in Europe (at festivals in Poland and Hungary). In 2019, the band took part in the National Eurovision Song Contest 2019 with the song Galyna guliala, reaching the final.

In early 2019, on the eve of the national selection for Eurovision 2019, the Ukrainian media reported that the band "Yuko" includes Russians. According to Ukrainian journalists, Yulia Yurina is a Russian citizen who moved to Ukraine 7 years ago, but still has Russian citizenship. Only in December 2018, she received a permanent residence permit in Ukraine. It turned out that the band had concerts in Russia, but the musicians said that "we have not performed in Russia for a year." Yulia Yurina has applied for Ukrainian citizenship, but her applications have been denied. In February 2025 she petitioned the Ministry of Culture of Ukraine to prove that she falls under one of the exceptions in the nationality law since she is a "strategically important person for Ukraine."

In 2020 Yuko disbanded. Yulia Yurina began a solo career and she released the live album "Gvara".

== Members ==
- Yulia Yurina is a soloist of band, professional folklorist. Russian citizen.
- Stas Koroliov is a multi-instrumentalist. Previously performed with a solo project.

== Discography ==
- DITCH (2017)
- DURA (2018)
