= Siren Song (Maruv song) =

2019 song by Maruv

Single by MARUV
- Released: 13 February 2019
- Recorded: 2018
- Length: 2:51
- Label: Warner Music Russia
- Songwriter(s): Anna Korsun; Mikhail Busin

MARUV singles chronology
"For You" (2018)	"Siren Song" (2019)	"Mon Amour" (2019)

"Siren Song" is a song by Ukrainian singer Maruv, which won the Ukrainian national final for the Eurovision Song Contest 2019 in Tel Aviv. However, due to a disagreement between Maruv and the broadcaster, she was forced to cancel her participation.

The music video for "Siren Song" was released on 5 April 2019.

== Track listing ==
- Digital download
1. "Siren Song" – 2:51

== Charts ==
=== Weekly charts ===
Chart (2019)	Peak position
CIS Airplay (TopHit)	1
Lithuania (AGATA)	70
Russia Airplay (TopHit)	2
Ukraine Airplay (TopHit)	2

=== Year-end charts ===
Chart (2019)	Position
Commonwealth of Independent States (Tophit)	5
Russia (Top All Media Hits, Tophit)	8
Russia (Top Radio Hits, Tophit)	8
Ukraine Airplay (Tophit)	48
Chart (2020)	Position
Commonwealth of Independent States (TopHit)	117
Russia Airplay (TopHit)	129
Ukraine Airplay (TopHit)	188

== Certifications ==
Region	Certification
Russia (NFPF)	3× Platinum

== Release history ==
Region	Date	Format	Label	Ref.
Various	13 February 2019	Digital download; streaming	Warner Music Russia	

== See also ==
- Ukraine in the Eurovision Song Contest 2019
