= Maruv =

Ukrainian singer (born 1991)

Maruv Марув
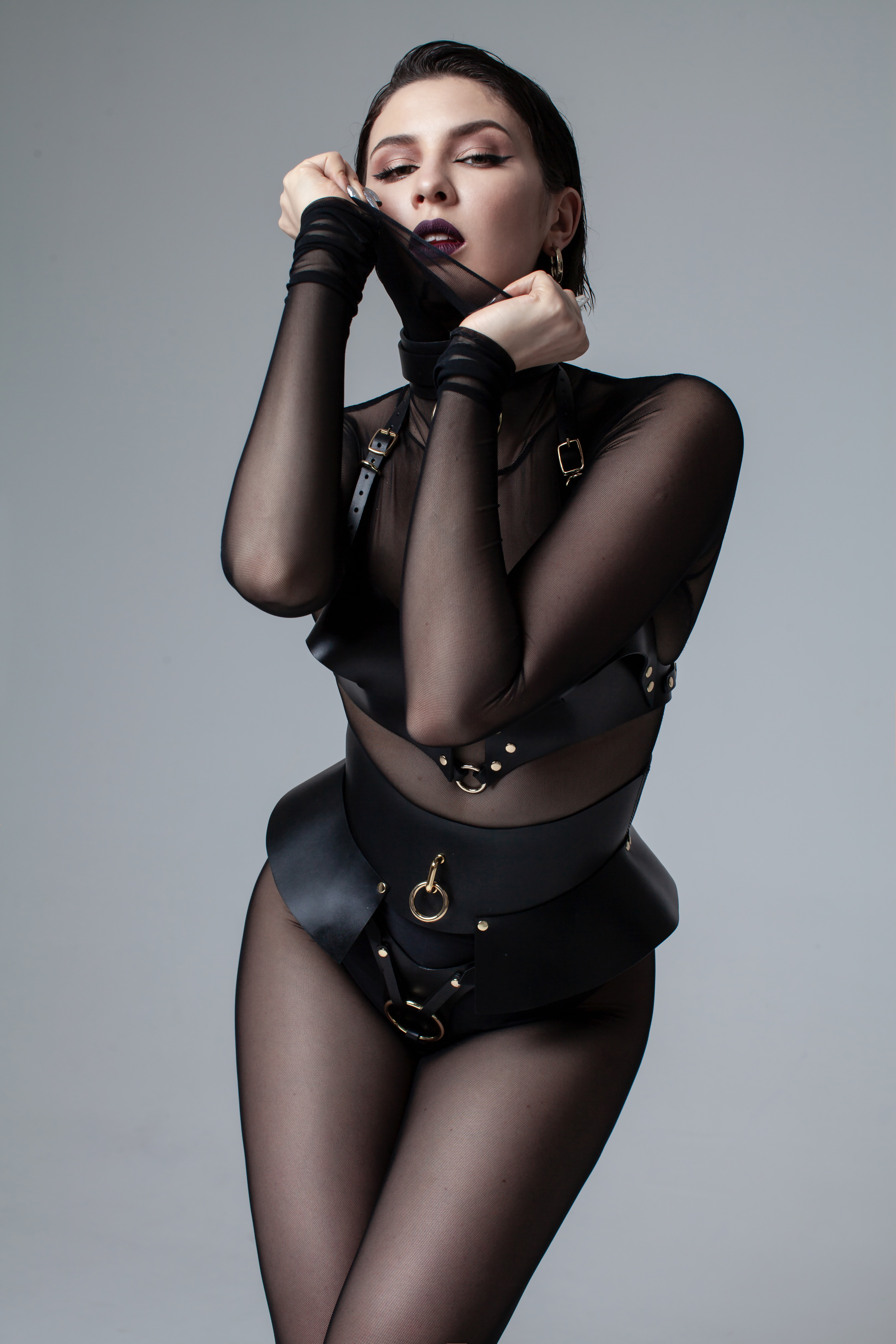
- Maruv in 2020

Background information
- Born: Anna Borysivna Popeliukh; 15 February 1991 (age 35); Pavlohrad, Ukraine
- Genres: Pop; electronic; blue-eyed soul
- Occupations: Singer; songwriter; record producer
- Years active: 2013–present
- Label: Warner Music Russia, USA
- Website: maruvofficial.com

Anna Borysivna Korsun (Ukrainian: Анна Борисівна Корсун; née Popeliukh [Попелюх]; born 15 February 1991), known professionally as Maruv (stylized in all caps), is a Ukrainian singer.

She used to be part of the band of the same name, the successor of the band The Pringlez, from February 2017 to March 2018. Later, Korsun gave an interview in which she explained that from then on she would be working on her own under the pseudonym.

== Biography and creativity ==
=== Early life and The Pringlez period ===
The singer was born as Anna Popeliukh in the Ukrainian city of Pavlohrad. In school she studied music and dance. In 2014, she graduated in a non-musical subject from the Polytechnic Institute in Kharkiv. Despite this, Popeliukh participated and reached the final of the contest The Voice of Ukraine. She is married to Oleksandr Korsun, whom she met while studying at the institute. Oleksandr was the PR manager of The Pringlez. The team included a drummer, guitarists, a songwriter, and also a photographer and sound engineer.

In 2015, the group represented Ukraine at the New Wave competition. In addition, one of their songs – "Easy to Love" – competed in the Ukrainian selection for Eurovision 2016.

=== 2017: Transition to Maruv and first album ===
In 2017, the band changed its name to Maruv. In addition to this, the group members decided to change the concept of their work. The old group name was left in the past, as well as their pop-rock performance style. They decided to leave behind their "teenage" creativity and adapt a modern and popular style. In May 2017, the band released its debut album, Stories. It includes seven tracks written in three languages – Ukrainian, Russian, English. On 23 September 2017, the band presented the album at a concert at their hometown of Kharkiv.

=== 2017–2018: Maruv & Boosin and Black Water ===
In 2017, Korsun met guitarist, DJ, and performer Mikhail Busin (also known under the pseudonym BOOSIN). Later, Korsun and the Busin co-created a label called Zori Sound. They realised that their voices were in harmony and decided to work further under the name of Maruv & Boosin. Their first joint song was "Spini". Later, they recorded a second joint song, "Drunk Groove", which became famous, even hitting the overseas charts. The track was released on 15 December 2017. Korsun was the author of the text, and Busin authored the music.

Maruv performed "Drunk Groove" at the opening of Muz-TV 2018. They gave a concert on 10 June in Moscow to mark the opening of FIFA World Cup 2018. The performance took place on Sparrow Hills. On 30 July 2018, they released a follow-up single to the lead track "Drunk Groove", titled "Focus on Me". It is the second single from their album Black Water, which was released on 28 September 2018, as a visual album.

=== 2019–present: Eurovision Song Contest and withdrawal ===
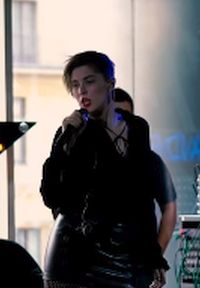
Maruv in 2019

On 23 February 2019, Maruv won the final of Vidbir for the Eurovision Song Contest 2019. Her win was marred by controversy about her concerts in Russia. The rights to her Eurovision song, "Siren Song", belong to the Russian record label Warner Music Russia and the label had organised her first ever solo concert to be held in Moscow at Izvestia Hall on 6 April 2019. After it became clear that she would be performing in two concerts in Russia the following months, Vice Prime Minister and Minister of Culture Vyacheslav Kyrylenko stated that artists who toured Russia or "did not recognise the territorial integrity of Ukraine" should not take part in Eurovision.

During the final, when asked on stage whether Crimea is part of Ukraine, she replied affirmatively, and when asked if Russia was an aggressor, she replied: "If the country has a bad president, that doesn't mean that all the people who live there are evil". After the show, when Ukraine's Channel 24 asked her to describe what was happening in Donbas and her position towards it, she replied:

This is a very difficult question for me to answer, because my relatives have lost their homes there and it is very difficult for me to talk about it. But I want peace to come at last and all this to be over.

On 24 February the National Public Broadcasting Company of Ukraine (UA:PBC) offered Maruv a contract; one of the terms forbid her to hold concerts in Russia. Maruv saw no harm in performing in Russia claiming "performing concerts is my way of bringing peace," later she confirmed she was willing to postpone her concerts. Maruv stated that the issue of not touring in Russia was not critical to her, and the major disagreement was about other conditions of the contract which she described as a cabal. She said that she is a tax-paying citizen of Ukraine and genuinely loves her country, however she is not ready to turn her participation in the contest into the "promo-action of Ukrainian politicians". "I am a musician, not the baseball bat on the political arena", she said.

The next day it was revealed that UA:PBC and Maruv were not able to reach an agreement on her participation in the contest. Ukraine withdrew from participating in Eurovision 2019 as a result of the controversy. "Siren Song" became a huge hit in CIS countries, and was certified three times platinum in Russia. On 29 November 2019, she released the EP Hellcat Story.

In 2020 Maruv presented her alter ego Shlakoblochina and released an EP Fatality under this name. She also recorded a Russian version of the song "More" for the game League of Legends.

== Personal life ==
Anna Korsun is married. Korsun announced via her social media on 15 February 2022 that she was pregnant with her first child.

Following the 2022 Russian invasion of Ukraine, Korsun appealed to the Russian military to stop fighting. She then disappeared from social media until November, when she stated that she was in a "safe place", accompanied by pictures of relaxation in Oman. On 13 March 2024, the Ukrainian media reported that she lives in Dubai, United Arab Emirates with her husband and child.

When activist Serhii Sternenko asked Korsun in September 2023 to donate money for drones for the Armed Forces of Ukraine, he was blocked by her official X account.

== Discography ==
=== Studio albums ===
- Stories (2017)
- Black Water (2018)
- No Name (2021)

=== Extended plays ===
- Stories (2017)
- Hellcat Story (2019)
- Fatality (2020) (as Shlakoblochina)
- Love Songs (2023) (as Sharlotta Ututu)

== Awards and nominations ==
Award	Year (Note: Indicates the year of ceremony. Each year is linked to the article about the awards held that year, wherever possible.)	Recipient(s) and nominee(s)	Category	Result	Ref.
M1 Music Awards	2018	Herself	Best Alternative Artist	Nominated	
M1 Music Awards	2018	Herself	Breakthrough of the Year	Nominated	
M1 Music Awards	2018	"Drunk Groove"	Dance Parade	Won	
M1 Music Awards	2019	"Siren Song"	Dance Parade	Nominated	
MTV Europe Music Awards	2019	Herself	Best MTV Russia Act	Won	
Yuna Music Awards	2019	Herself	Breakthrough of the Year	Won	
Yuna Music Awards	2019	Black Water	Best Album	Nominated	
Yuna Music Awards	2019	Maruv & Boosin	Best Duet	Won	
Yuna Music Awards	2019	"Drunk Groove"	Best Video	Nominated	
Yuna Music Awards	2019	"Drunk Groove"	Best Song in Another Language	Won	
Yuna Music Awards	2019	"Drunk Groove"	Best Electronic Song	Won	
Yuna Music Awards	2020	Herself	Best Performer	Nominated	
Yuna Music Awards	2020	"Siren Song"	Best Song in Another Language	Nominated	
Yuna Music Awards	2020	"Siren Song"	Best Electronic Song	Won	
Yuna Music Awards	2021	"I Want You"	Best Electronic Song	Pending	
Culture Music Awards	2020	"Sad Song"	Best English-language song	Pending	
Novoye Radio Awards	2021	Herself	Best Female Artist	Pending	
Berlin Music Video Awards	2022	Candy Shop	Most Trashy	Won	
