= Brunettes Shoot Blondes =

Ukrainian indie rock band

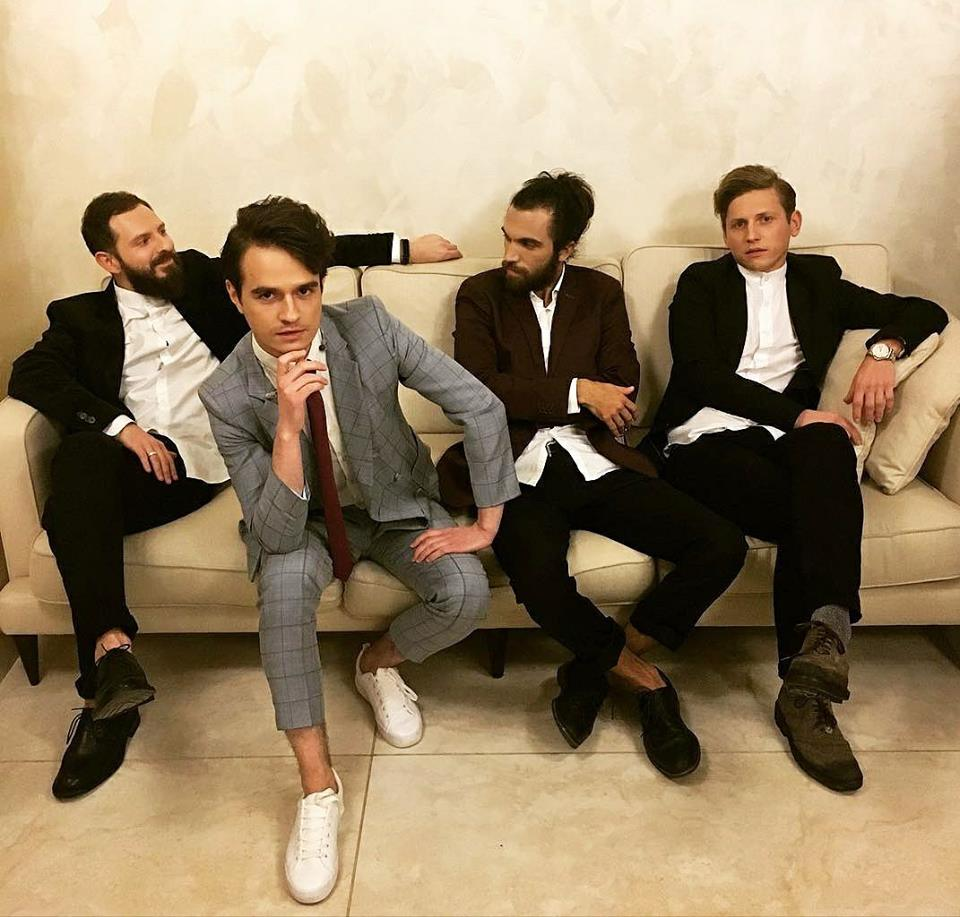
- from left to right: Yevhen Kobzaruk, Andrii Kovalov, Dmytro Leonov, Roman Sobol

Background information
- Origin: Kryvyi Rih, Ukraine
- Genres: indie, alternative, electronic
- Years active: 2010–present
- Label: independent
- Members: Andrii Kovalov; Roman Sobol; Yevhen Kobzaruk; Dmytro Leonov

Brunettes Shoot Blondes is a Ukrainian indie rock band, founded in early 2010 and based out of Kryvyi Rih, Ukraine. The band released 2 mini-albums and 7 singles.

The group gained international recognition in September 2014 for an animated music video to their song "Knock Knock". The video went viral, receiving more than five million YouTube views in the 10 days after its release. In early 2015, the band continued developing their music video style for the song 'Bittersweet', made in partnership with German automobile manufacturer Opel. Brunettes Shoot Blondes currently has no contract with any record labels, instead promoting the band independently.

== Career ==
Since 2011, Brunettes Shoot Blondes have performed numerous concerts in their homeland Ukraine and across mainland Europe. The group has played at festivals including OstAnders (Nuremberg, Germany), Sziget (Budapest, Hungary), Colors of Ostrava (Ostrava, Czech Republic), Waves Vienna (Vienna, Austria) and Metronome (Prague, Czech Republic). In 2011, they also participated in the BalconyTV project in Poznań. The band continues to work on new songs and music videos, in between their appearances in concert and on Ukrainian TV channels.

Brunettes Shoot Blondes has also cooperated with famous commercial brands to produce music for advertising, including Watsons (song: You Broke My Heart) and Nova Poshta (songs: Tomorrow and Nothing At All). The music video for the song 'Bittersweet' was produced in partnership with German car maker Opel.

=== Knock Knock ===
In September 2014, Brunettes Shoot Blondes released a new music video on YouTube for their song Knock Knock. The story features an animated love story of a rabbit and a girl, shot in real time using 14 Apple iPhones, iPads and MacBooks. The band's members produced the video, with the band's frontman Andrii Kovalov assuming the role of video director. The video attracted more than 600,000 YouTube views in the first five days after being uploaded. By April 2015, this number was more than seven million. The video was also posted on Facebook and received over 26 million views and 800,000 shares.

In October 2014, the video topped YouTube in the category of 'New performers «Emerging Artists From Across the Globe»'. Various international media outlets conducted interviews and features with the band following the release of 'Knock Knock' including Billboard, Yahoo!, The Daily Mirror, Rolling Stone, Mashable, Business Insider, Daily Mail, USA Today, The Verge, Dezeen and The Huffington Post.

In May 2015 the music video Knock Knock won the "Best Concept" award at the Berlin Music Video Award 2015.

The band's success was recognized by the Ukrainian president's administration, with frontman Andrii Kovalov becoming one of the first Ukrainian citizens to receive one of the new biometric passports. Kovaliov thinks the video has improved Ukraine's international standing and relationship within the European Union, saying "everybody should actually do what they can to make our country stronger, to show that we're a European country and that we have to do something for this country".

=== 2015-2016 ===
In the beginning of 2015, Brunettes Shoot Blondes released a debut EP Bittersweet. The album features four songs including the well-known singles "Knock Knock" and "Bittersweet'"

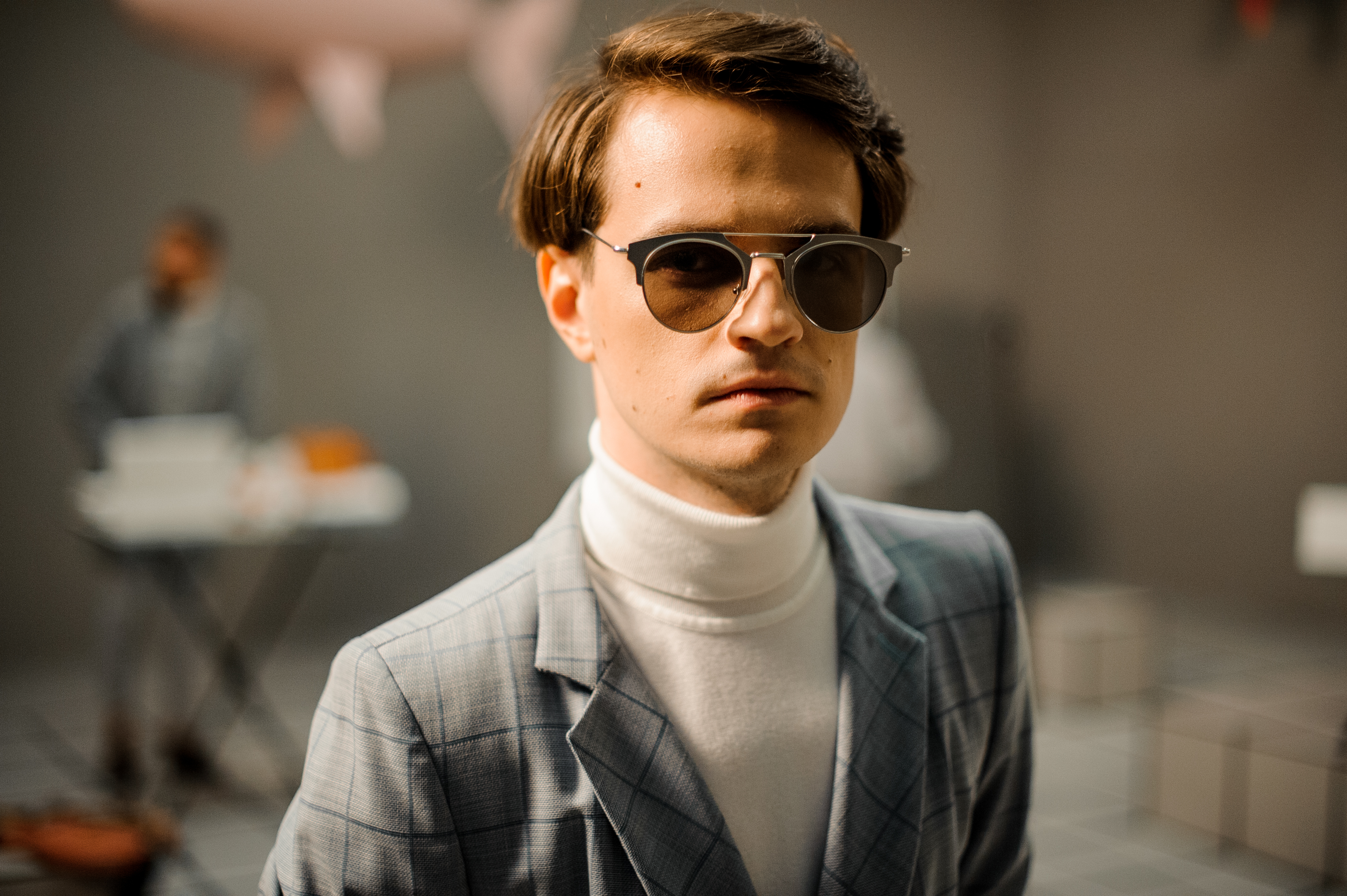
Andrii Kovalov

Front man Andrii Kovalov says: “EP 'Bittersweet' was the first release into which we invested lots of strength and inspiration. Most of the material was recorded in studios in Warsaw and Kyiv”. The song was produced in partnership with German advertising agency Scholz & Friends and with German car maker Opel. The music video develops the use of a 'picture in picture' effect used in the video for 'Knock Knock' – consisting of footage performed directly from the screens of devices, without editing. After Bittersweet's release, Brunettes Shoot Blondes went on to guest perform on Ukraine's X-factor.

After Bittersweet, they became very active on the European music festival circuit, playing Sziget, Colors of Ostrava, and others. In the summer of 2015 they took part into the Berlin Music Video Awards, winning the Best Concept category with Knock Knock.

In 2016, Brunettes Shoot Blondes released the song Every Monday. They competed in the Ukrainian National Song Selection for Eurovision 2016, with Every Monday as their entrant.

=== 2017-Now ===
Brunettes Shoot Blondes has remained active on the Festival circuit, playing Waves Vienna in 2017, and Metronome (Prague) in 2018. The latest release was the 2018 EP and music video Hips. It was supported by Apple Music, and appeared on the front page of the service in more than 14 countries. Moreover, the music video for Hips was released to critical acclaim, receiving Best Music Video honors from the Los Angeles Film Awards.

On January 22, 2019, it was announced that Brunettes Shoot Blondes would be competing in the Ukrainian Song Selection for Eurovision 2019.

== Discography ==
=== EPs ===
- 2015 — Bittersweet
- 2017 — Hips

=== Singles ===
- "I Don't Know"
- "You Broke My Heart"
- "You've Got To Move"
- "Cigarette Day"
- "Sarah"
- "One, Two, Three, Girl"
- "Every Monday"
- "You've Got to Move"
- "Hips"

== Music videos ==
Year	Video	Director	Album
2013	«I Don't Know»	Denis Breslavskiy	—
2014	«Knock Knock»	Andrii Kovalov	Bittersweet
2014	«Bittersweet»	Andrii Kovalov	Bittersweet
2017	«Hips»	Andrii Kovalov	Hips
