= Ukraine in the Eurovision Song Contest =

- Eurovision Song Contest
- Participating broadcaster: Public Broadcasting Company of Ukraine (UA:PBC/Suspilne; 2017–present) Formerly: National Television Company of Ukraine (NTU; 2003–2016)

Participation summary
- Appearances: 21 (21 finals)
- First appearance: 2003
- Highest placement: 1st: 2004, 2016, 2022
- Host: 2005, 2017
- Participation history: 2003; 2004; 2005; 2006; 2007; 2008; 2009; 2010; 2011; 2012; 2013; 2014; 2015; 2016; 2017; 2018; ~~2019~~; ~~2020~~; 2021; 2022; 2023; 2024; 2025; 2026

Related articles
- Vidbir

External links
- Suspilne website
- Ukraine's page at Eurovision.com
- For the most recent participation see Ukraine in the Eurovision Song Contest 2026

Ukraine has been represented at the Eurovision Song Contest 21 times since making its debut in 2003. The current Ukrainian participating broadcaster in the contest is the Public Broadcasting Company of Ukraine (UA:PBC/Suspilne), which has selected its entrant with the national competition Vidbir in recent years. Ukraine has won the contest three times: in 2004 with "Wild Dances" by Ruslana, in 2016 with "1944" by Jamala, and in 2022 with "Stefania" by Kalush Orchestra, thus becoming the first country in the 21st century and the first Eastern European country to win the contest three times. The 2005 and 2017 contests were held in Kyiv, while the 2023 contest was held in Liverpool, United Kingdom, due to the Russian invasion of Ukraine.

Since the introduction of the semi-final round in 2004, Ukraine is the only country outside of the "Big Five" to have qualified for the final of every contest they have competed, and has been placed outside the top-ten only six times. Ukraine has a total of nine top-five placements, with "Dancing Lasha Tumbai" by Verka Serduchka (2007) and "Shady Lady" by Ani Lorak (2008) both finishing second, "Gravity" by Zlata Ognevich (2013) as well as "Teresa & Maria" by Alyona Alyona and Jerry Heil (2024) third, "Angel" by Mika Newton fourth (2011), and "Shum" by Go_A fifth (2021), in addition to its wins. The only countries with more top-five results in the 21st century are Sweden (13) and Russia (10).

== Participation ==
The National Television Company of Ukraine (NTU) was a full member of the European Broadcasting Union (EBU) from 1st January 1993, thus eligible to participate in the Eurovision Song Contest from then. It participated in the contest representing Ukraine from the 48th edition in 2003. NTU had previously planned to debut at the Eurovision Song Contest in 1993 and 1996, but the planned entries failed to materialize. Since 2017, its successor, the Public Broadcasting Company of Ukraine (UA:PBC/Suspilne), has been the participating broadcaster representing Ukraine.

== History ==
Ukraine made its debut in the contest in 2003, when it finished in 14th place with the song "Hasta la vista" performed by Oleksandr Ponomariov.

Ukraine won the contest at the second attempt in 2004, with the song "Wild Dances" by Ruslana, defeating second-placed Serbia and Montenegro by 17 points, 280 to 263. In 2016, Ukraine became the first Eastern European country to win the contest twice, when "1944" by Jamala won. The televote was won by Russia and the jury vote by Australia; Ukraine was second in both, but won with an overall total of 534 points, with Australia second with 511 points and Russia third with 491 points. In 2017, Ukraine was pre-qualified for the final as hosts, however it achieved its worst result to date – 24th place with 36 points.

Ukraine was absent twice from the contest, in 2015 and 2019, for reasons related to the ongoing war with Russia:

- NTU sat out the 2015 contest because of financial difficulties in relation to the war in Donbas. However, Ukraine broadcast the contest despite not taking part. NTU pledged to bring Ukraine back to the contest for 2016, which was finalized and announced on 16 September 2015.
- Vidbir, the Ukrainian national selection for the 2019 contest, was won by Maruv with "Siren Song". However, UA:PBC required any potential representative in the contest to sign a contract which contained a clause to forbid them from performing in Russia. The winner Maruv, as well as runners-up Freedom Jazz and Kazka, all refused to sign the contract, leading to Ukraine's withdrawal from the contest on 27 February.

In 2020, Go_A won the national selection Vidbir and was set to represent Ukraine with the song "Solovey", before the contest was cancelled due to the COVID-19 pandemic. They were instead internally selected to represent the country the following year with the song "Shum", with which they finished in fifth place. After the contest, "Shum" entered the Billboard Global 200 at position 158, becoming the first ever Ukrainian-language song to chart there. Ukraine won the contest for a third time in 2022, with the song "Stefania" performed by Kalush Orchestra. "Stefania" later went on to surpass the peak of "Shum" on the Billboard Global 200, charting at position 85.

Since the introduction of the semi-final round in 2004, Ukraine is the only country to have qualified for the final of every edition they have competed in. (Note: No country has always participated in the final since the introduction of semi-finals in 2004. Ukraine, despite having always reached the final, did not participate in the 2015 and 2019 contests. Additionally, the 2020 contest was cancelled due to the COVID-19 pandemic. The "Big Five" (France, Germany, Italy, Spain and the United Kingdom) are also not counted in this list since they receive automatic qualification to the final.) Ukraine has a total of 14 top-ten placements (among those are nine top-five placements). Ukraine's participation and success in the contest has been acknowledged as a factor in the country's growing soft power and international image. This view is shared by Ukrainian president Volodymyr Zelenskyy, who has supported the country's continued participation following the Russian invasion as a way to promote the Ukrainian national cause internationally.

== Participation overview ==
The following lists Ukraine's entries in the Eurovision Song Contest along with their result.

Table key
1	First place
2	Second place
3	Third place
◇	Entry selected but did not compete

Year	Artist	Song	Language	Final	Points	Semi	Points
2003	Oleksandr Ponomariov	"Hasta la vista"	English	14	30	No semi-finals	
2004	Ruslana	"Wild Dances"	English, Ukrainian	1	280	2	256
2005	GreenJolly	"Razom nas bahato" (Разом нас багато)	Ukrainian, English	19	30	Host country	
2006	Tina Karol	"Show Me Your Love"	English	7	145	7	146
2007	Verka Serduchka	"Dancing Lasha Tumbai"	English, German, Ukrainian	2	235	Top 10 in 2006 final (Note: According to the then-Eurovision rules, the top ten non-Big Four countries from the previous year along with the Big Four automatically qualified for the Grand Final without having to compete in semi-finals. For example, if Germany and France placed inside the top ten, the 11th and 12th spots were advanced to next year's Grand Final along with all countries ranked in the top ten.)	
2008	Ani Lorak	"Shady Lady"	English	2	230	1	152
2009	Svetlana Loboda	"Be My Valentine! (Anti-Crisis Girl)"	English	12	76	6	80
2010	Alyosha	"Sweet People"	English	10	108	7	77
2011	Mika Newton	"Angel"	English	4	159	6	81
2012	Gaitana	"Be My Guest"	English	15	65	8	64
2013	Zlata Ognevich	"Gravity"	English	3	214	3	140
2014	Mariya Yaremchuk	"Tick-Tock"	English	6	113	5	118
2016	Jamala	"1944"	English, Crimean Tatar	1	534	2	287
2017	O.Torvald	"Time"	English	24	36	Host country	
2018	Mélovin	"Under the Ladder"	English	17	130	6	179
2020	Go_A ◇	"Solovey" (Соловей) ◇	Ukrainian ◇	Contest cancelled (Note: The 2020 contest was cancelled due to the COVID-19 pandemic.)			
2021	Go_A	"Shum" (Шум)	Ukrainian	5	364	2	267
2022	Kalush Orchestra	"Stefania" (Стефанія)	Ukrainian	1	631	1	337
2023	Tvorchi	"Heart of Steel"	English, Ukrainian	6	243	Previous winner (Note: Ukraine was unable to host the 2023 contest due to security concerns resulting from the Russian invasion of Ukraine. The United Kingdom, as the second-placing country in the 2022 contest, hosted on Ukraine's behalf, with Ukraine automatically qualifying for the 2023 final as the previous year's winning country.)	
2024	Alyona Alyona and Jerry Heil	"Teresa & Maria"	Ukrainian, English	3	453	2	173
2025	Ziferblat	"Bird of Pray"	Ukrainian, English	9	218	1	137
2026	Leléka	"Ridnym" (Рідним)	English, Ukrainian	9	221	6	174
2027	Confirmed intention to participate †						

== Trivia ==
=== Songs by language ===
1. English (68.4%)
2. Ukrainian (28.1%)
3. Crimean Tatar (1.95%)
4. German (1.51%)

Songs	Language	Years
19	English	2003, 2004, 2005, 2006, 2007, 2008, 2009, 2010, 2011, 2012, 2013, 2014, 2016, 2017, 2018, 2023, 2024, 2025, 2026
10	Ukrainian	2004, 2005, 2007, 2020, 2021, 2022, 2023, 2024, 2025, 2026
1	Crimean Tatar	2016
1	German	2007

=== Selection process ===
Year	Selection process	Channel
2003	Internal selection	NTU
2004	Internal selection	NTU
2005	National final with 79 participants	NTU
2006	National final with 3 participants	NTU
2007	National final with 7 participants	NTU
2008	Internal selection for artist; national final with 5 songs	NTU
2009	National final with 31 participants	NTU
2010	Internal selection for artist; national final with 5 songs; winning song of the first national final continued onto a second national final with 20 participants	NTU
2011	National final with 31 participants	NTU
2012	Online vote with 4 songs; national final with 21 participants	NTU
2013	National final with 20 participants	NTU
2014	National final with 20 participants	NTU

Year	Selection process	Channel
2016	Vidbir with 18 participants	NTU; STB
2017	Vidbir with 24 participants	UA:PBC; STB
2018	Vidbir with 18 participants	UA:PBC; STB
~~2019~~	Vidbir with 16 participants	UA:PBC; STB
~~2020~~	Vidbir with 16 participants	UA:PBC; STB
2021	Internal selection	UA:PBC; STB
2022	Vidbir with 8 participants	UA:PBC
2023	Vidbir with 10 participants	Suspilne
2024	Vidbir with 11 participants	Suspilne
2025	Vidbir with 10 participants	Suspilne
2026	Vidbir with 10 participants	Suspilne
2027	TBA	Suspilne

== Hostings ==
Year	Location	Venue	Presenters
2005	Kyiv	Palace of Sports	Masha Efrosynina and Pavlo Shylko
2017	Kyiv	International Exhibition Centre	Volodymyr Ostapchuk, Oleksandr Skichko and Timur Miroshnychenko

Following its victory in 2022, Ukraine was initially given the opportunity to host the 2023 contest, however, the EBU later decided that the country would not be able to host due to security concerns caused by the Russian invasion of Ukraine, making Ukraine the first country since Israel in 1979 to win the contest but not host it the following year. The 2022 runner-up, the United Kingdom, hosted the 2023 contest on Ukraine's behalf, and Ukraine was granted automatic qualification for the final.

== Awards ==
=== Marcel Bezençon Awards ===
Year	Category	Song	Performer	Final	Points	Host city	Ref.
2004	Artistic Award (Note: Voted by previous winners.)	"Wild Dances"	Ruslana	1	280	(Turkey) Istanbul	
2007	Press Award	"Dancing Lasha Tumbai"	Verka Serduchka	2	235	(Finland) Helsinki	
2008	Artistic Award	"Shady Lady"	Ani Lorak	2	230	(Serbia) Belgrade	
2016	Artistic Award (Note: Voted by commentators.)	"1944"	Jamala	1	534	(Sweden) Stockholm	

=== Barbara Dex Award ===
Year	Performer	Host city	Ref.
2007	Verka Serduchka	(Finland) Helsinki	

== Related involvement ==
=== Heads of delegation ===
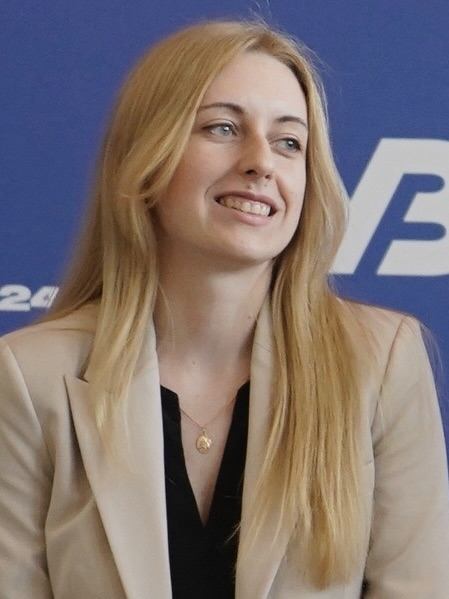
Oksana Skybinska, head of the Ukrainian delegation since 2018.

Each participating broadcaster in the Eurovision Song Contest assigns a head of delegation as the EBU's contact person and the leader of their delegation at the event. The delegation, whose size can greatly vary, includes a head of press, the performers, songwriters, composers, and backing vocalists, among others.

Year	Head of delegation	Ref.
2004	Pavlo Grytsak	
2007–2016	Victoria Romanova	
2018–present	Oksana Skybinska	

=== Jury members ===
Each participating broadcaster assembles a five-member jury panel consisting of music industry professionals for the semi-finals and final of the Eurovision Song Contest, ranking all entries except for their own. The juries' votes constitute 50% of the overall result alongside televoting. In 2026, the rules were updated to include a requirement for two additional jury members to be under 25 years of age.

Year	First member	Second member	Third member	Fourth member	Fifth member	Sixth member	Seventh member	Ref.
2009	Roman Nedzelskiy	Oleksandr Ponomariov	Irena Zagorodnyuk	Iryna Rozental	Oleksandr Zlotnyk	not required	not required	
2014	Oleksandr Zlotnyk	Kateryna Komar	Kostiantyn Mishukov	Alla Popova	Olena Valovyk	not required	not required	
2016	Oleksandr Ksenofontov	Maria Burmaka	Valentin Koval	Valeria Chachibaya	Andre France	not required	not required	
2017	Yurii Rybchynsky	Illaria	Serhiy Grachov	Yana Pryadko	Serhiy Gagarin	not required	not required	
2018	Vitaliy Klimov	Denys Zhupnyk	Arthur Danielyan	Alla Moskovka	Khrystyna Soloviy	not required	not required	
2021	Oleksandr Ponomariov	Illaria	Igor Kondratiuk	Alla Moskovka	Alyona Alyona	not required	not required	
2022	Andriy Yatskiv	Andriy Kapral	Iryna Fedyshyn	Lukian Halkin	Vadim Lysycia	not required	not required	
2023	Oleksandr Sydorenko	Svitlana Tarabarova	Antonina Matviyenko	Oleh Sobchuk	Evgeny Khmara	not required	not required	
2024	Alyosha	Iryna Horova	Kostiantyn Tomilchenko	Maksym Nahorniak	Olena Koliadenko	not required	not required	
2025	Dmytro Shurov	Kostiantyn Bocharov	Natella Zatsaryna	Olena Shoptenko	Tetyana Reshetnyak	not required	not required	
2026	Ihor Kyrylenko	Valentyn Leshchynskyi	Valerii Kharchyshyn	Yevhen Kot	Hanna Svyrydovych	Victoria Niro	Klavdia Petrivna	

=== Commentators and spokespersons ===
Year	NTU/UA:PBC commentator	STB commentator	Radio commentator	Spokesperson	Ref.
2002	Pavlo Shylko, Mariya Orlova	No broadcast	No broadcast	Did not participate	
2003	Pavlo Shylko, Dmytro Kryzhanivskyi	No broadcast	No broadcast	Lyudmyla Hariv	
2004	Rodion Pryntsevskyi	No broadcast	No broadcast	Pavlo Shylko	
2005	Yaroslav Chornenkyi	No broadcast	Galyna Babiy	Mariya Orlova	
2006	Pavlo Shylko	No broadcast	No broadcast	Igor Posypaiko	
2007	Timur Miroshnychenko	No broadcast	No broadcast	Kateryna Osadcha	
2008	Timur Miroshnychenko	No broadcast	No broadcast	Marysya Horobets	
2009	Timur Miroshnychenko	No broadcast	No broadcast	Marysya Horobets	
2010	Timur Miroshnychenko	No broadcast	No broadcast	Iryna Zhuravska	
2011	Timur Miroshnychenko, Tetiana Terekhova	No broadcast	Olena Zelinchenko	Ruslana	
2012	Timur Miroshnychenko, Tetiana Terekhova	No broadcast	Olena Zelinchenko	Oleksiy Matias	
2013	Timur Miroshnychenko, Tetiana Terekhova	No broadcast	Olena Zelinchenko	Oleksiy Matias	
2014	Timur Miroshnychenko, Tetiana Terekhova	No broadcast	Olena Zelinchenko	Zlata Ognevich	
2015	Timur Miroshnychenko, Tetiana Terekhova	No broadcast	No broadcast	Did not participate	
2016	Timur Miroshnychenko, Tetiana Terekhova	No broadcast	Olena Zelinchenko	Verka Serduchka	
2017	Tetiana Terekhova, Andrii Horodyskyi	No broadcast	Olena Zelinchenko	Zlata Ognevich	
2018	Timur Miroshnychenko (all shows); Mariya Yaremchuk (semi-final 1); Alyosha (semi-final 2); Jamala (final)	Serhiy Prytula	Olena Zelinchenko	Nata Zhyzhchenko	
2019	Timur Miroshnychenko	Serhiy Prytula	No broadcast	Did not participate	
2021	Timur Miroshnychenko	Serhiy Prytula	Olena Zelinchenko (UR1); Anna Zakletska, Dmytro Zakharchenko (Radio Promin)	Tayanna	
2022	Timur Miroshnychenko	No broadcast	Timur Miroshnychenko (semi-finals) (Note: The semi-finals on Radio Promin featured TV commentary by Miroshnychenko while radio presenters Oleksandra Franko and Yevhen Pavliukovskyi provided studio discussions during TV commercial breaks.); Anna Zakletska, Dmytro Zakharchenko (final)	Kateryna Pavlenko	
2023	Timur Miroshnychenko	No broadcast	Oleksandra Franko, Oleksandr Barbelen	Zlata Ognevich	
2024	Timur Miroshnychenko (all shows); Vasyl Baidak (final)	No broadcast	Dmytro Zakharchenko, Lesia Antypenko (Note: The broadcast of the semi-finals mostly featured TV commentary by Miroshnychenko. Only the second recaps (which Miroshnychenko left unnarrated on TV) were commentated on by Zakharchenko and Antypenko. The broadcasts also included brief studio discussions and brief on-site reports by Anna Zakletska between the close of the voting window and results announcements, which were presented by Zakharchenko and Antypenko.)	Jamala	
2025	Timur Miroshnychenko (all shows); Olexandr Pedan (semi-final 1); Vlad Kuran (semi-final 2); Alyona Alyona (final)	No broadcast	Dmytro Zakharchenko, Lesia Antypenko (semi-finals); Anna Zakletska, Denys Denysenko (final)	Jerry Heil	
2026	Timur Miroshnychenko (all shows); Vasyl Baidak (semi-final 1); Svitlana Tarabarova (semi-final 2); Alyona Alyona (final)	No broadcast	Dmytro Zakharchenko, Lesia Antypenko (semi-finals); TBA (final)	Daniil Leshchynskyi	

=== Stage directors ===
Year	Stage director(s)	Ref.
2003	Anatoliy Zalevskyy	
2004	Iryna Mazur	
2005	Kostiantyn Tomilchenko	
2008	Fokas Evangelinos	
2009	Alan Badoev	
2011	Anatoliy Zalevskyy	
2012	Olha Semeshkina	
2013	Maksym Lytvynov	
2014	Olena Koliadenko	
2016	Kostiantyn Tomilchenko and Oleksandr Bratkovskyi	
2018	Kostiantyn Tomilchenko and Oleksandr Bratkovskyi	
2021	Kostiantyn Tomilchenko and Oleksandr Bratkovskyi	
2022	Oleksii Zhembrovskyi	
2023	Oleh Bodnarchuk	
2024	Tanu Muino	
2025	Mariia Korostelova	
2026	Illia Dutsyk	

=== Costume designers ===
Year	Costume designers	Ref.
2004	Roksolana Bogutska	
2005	Liliia Litkovska	
2006	Victoria Hres	
2007	Anzhela Lysytsia	
2008	Roberto Cavalli	
2009	Svetlana Loboda	
2010	Liliia Litkovska	
2011	Olga Navrodska	
2012	Liliia Litkovska	
2013	Olena Reva	
2014	Hanna Osmekhina	
2016	Ivan Frolov	
2021	Dmytro Kuriata	
2023	Ivan Frolov	
2024	Marharyta Shekel	
2025	Ivan Frolov	
2026	Liliia Litkovska & Marharyta Shekel	

== Photo gallery ==
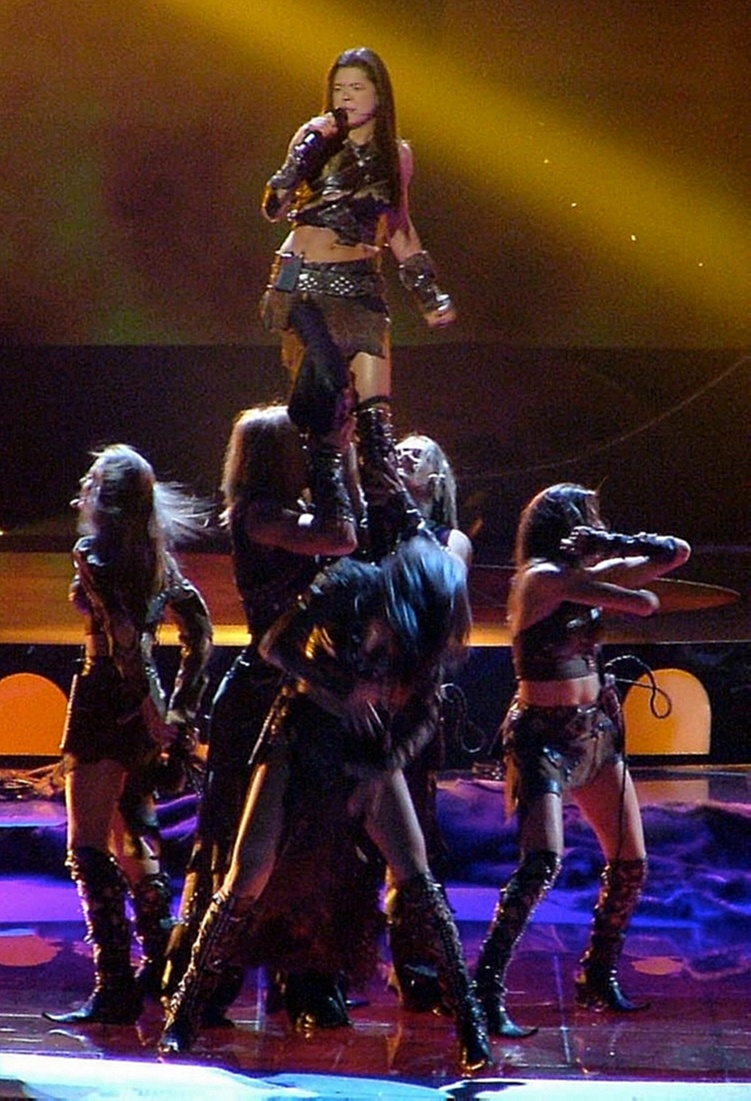
Ruslana performing "Wild Dances" in Istanbul (2004)

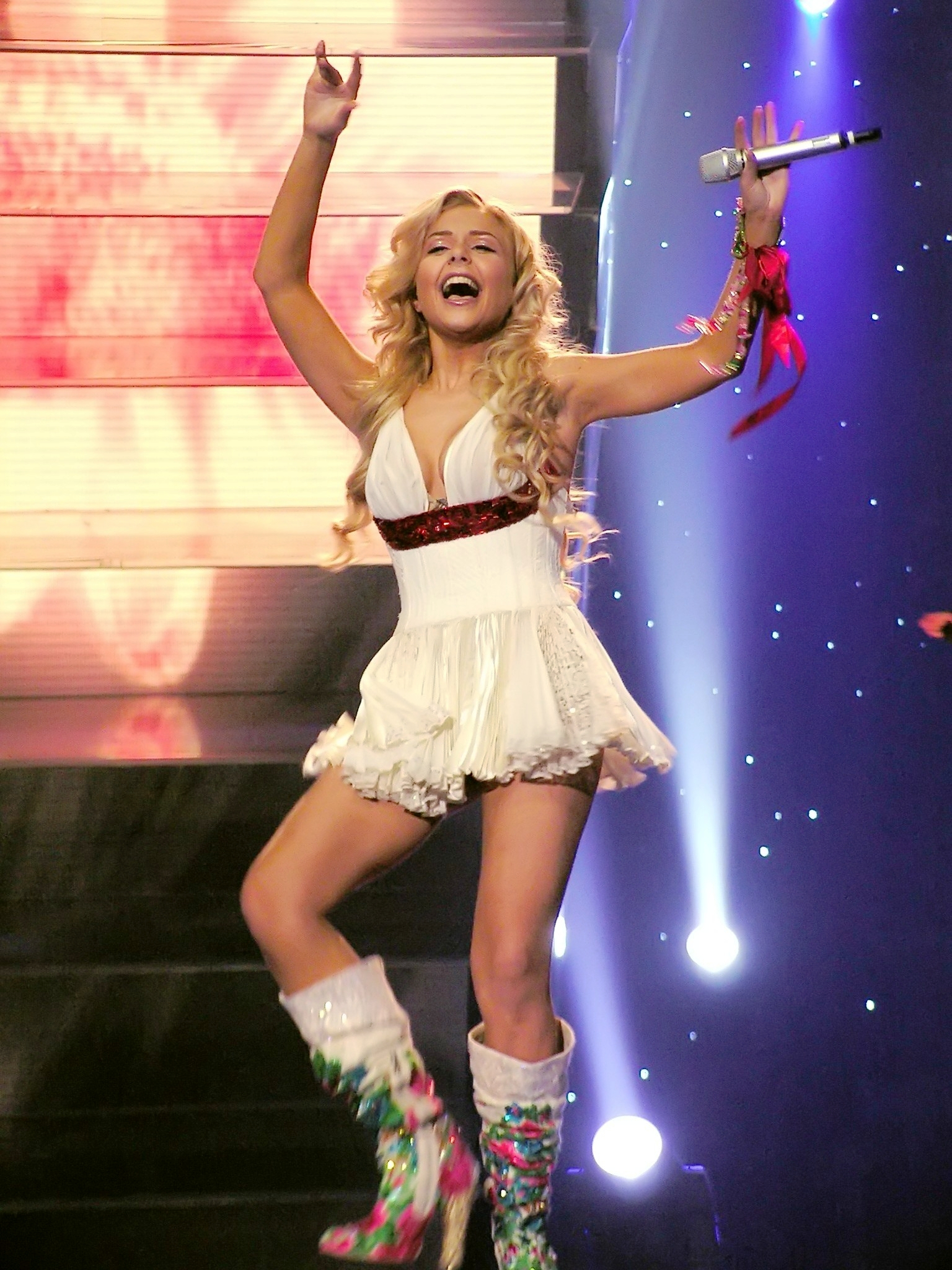
Tina Karol performing "Show Me Your Love" in Athens (2006)

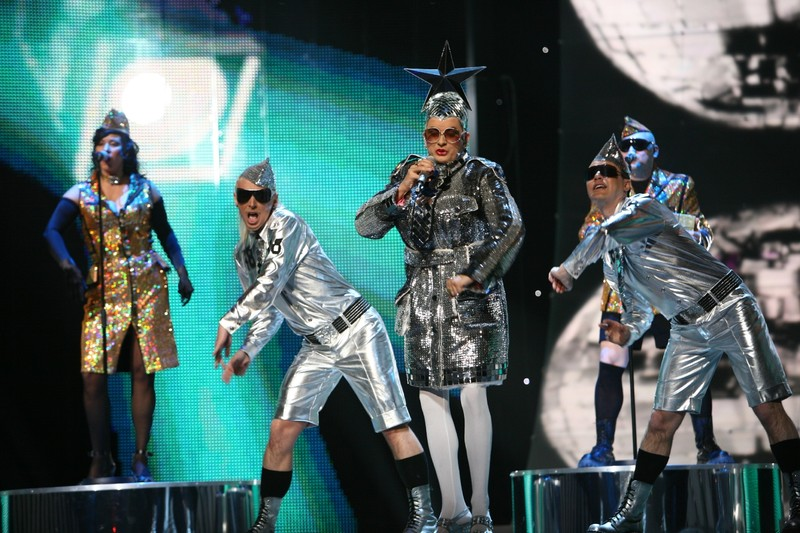
Verka Serduchka performing "Dancing Lasha Tumbai" in Helsinki (2007)

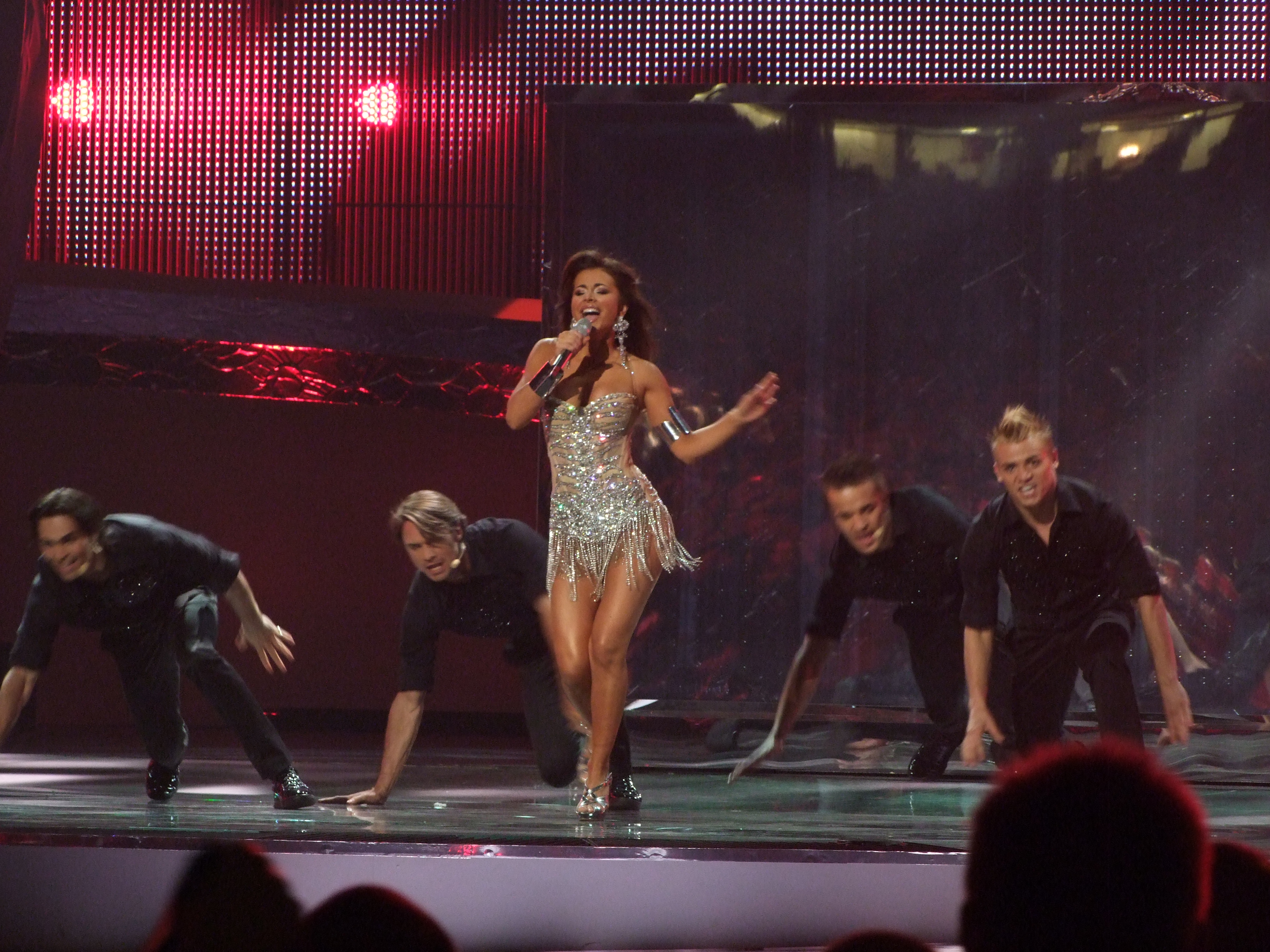
Ani Lorak performing "Shady Lady" in Belgrade (2008)

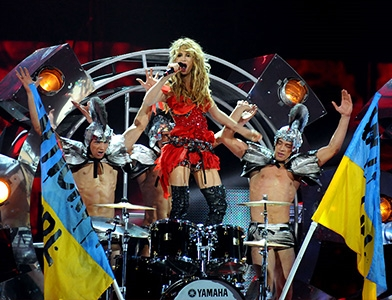
Svetlana Loboda performing "Be My Valentine! (Anti-Crisis Girl)" in Moscow (2009)

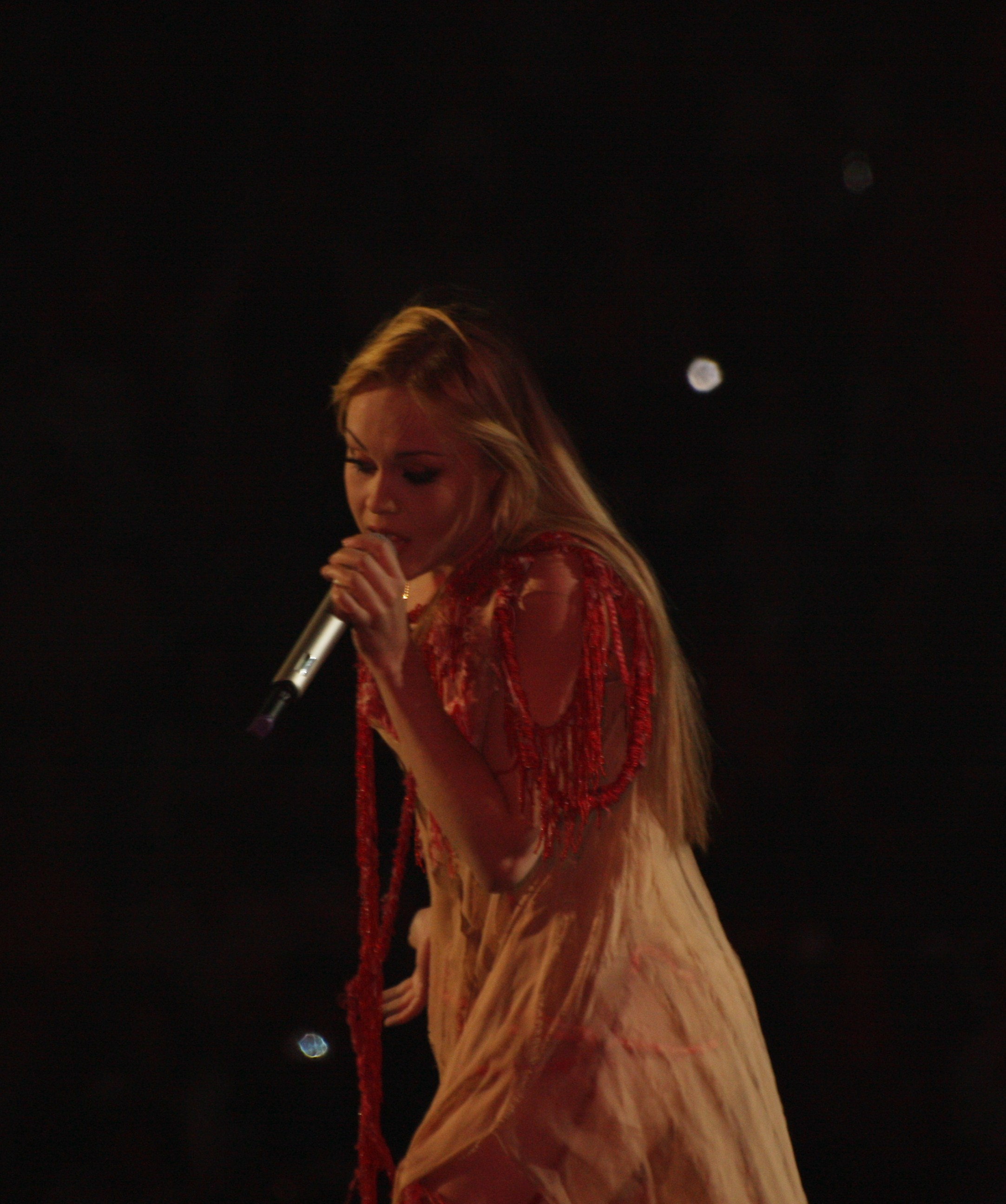
Alyosha performing "Sweet People" in Oslo (2010)

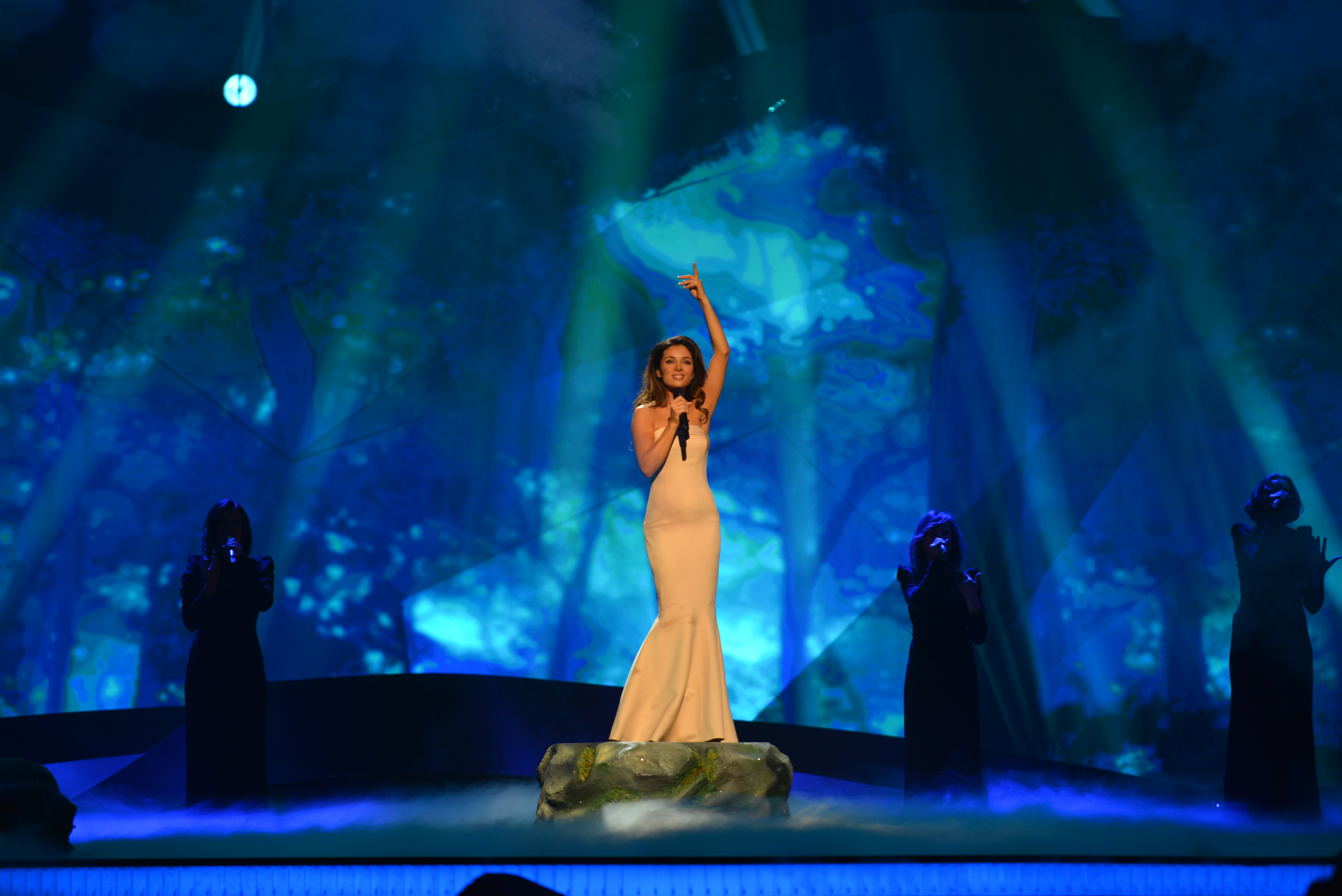
Zlata Ognevich performing "Gravity" in Malmö (2013)

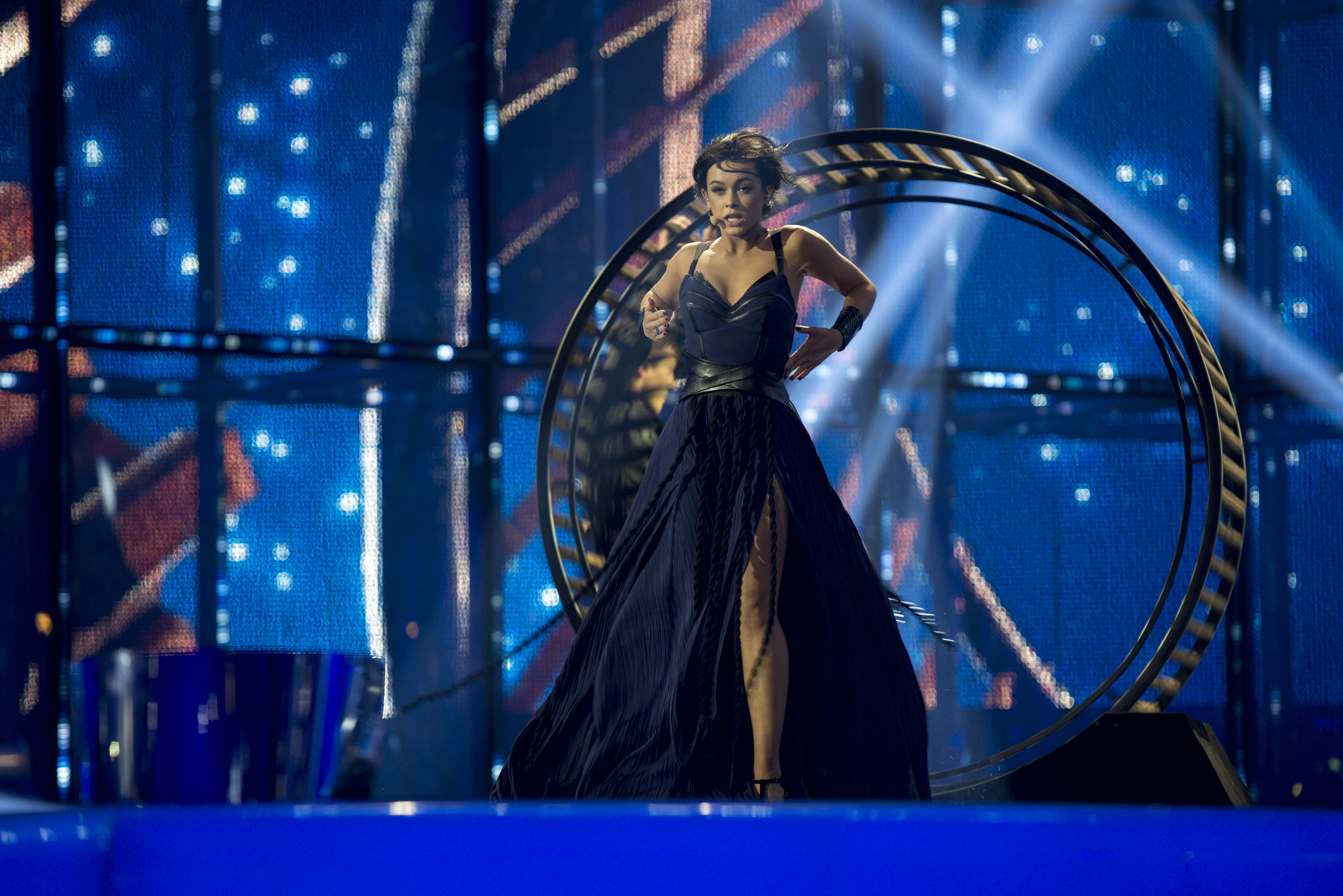
Maria Yaremchuk performing "Tick-Tock" in Copenhagen (2014)

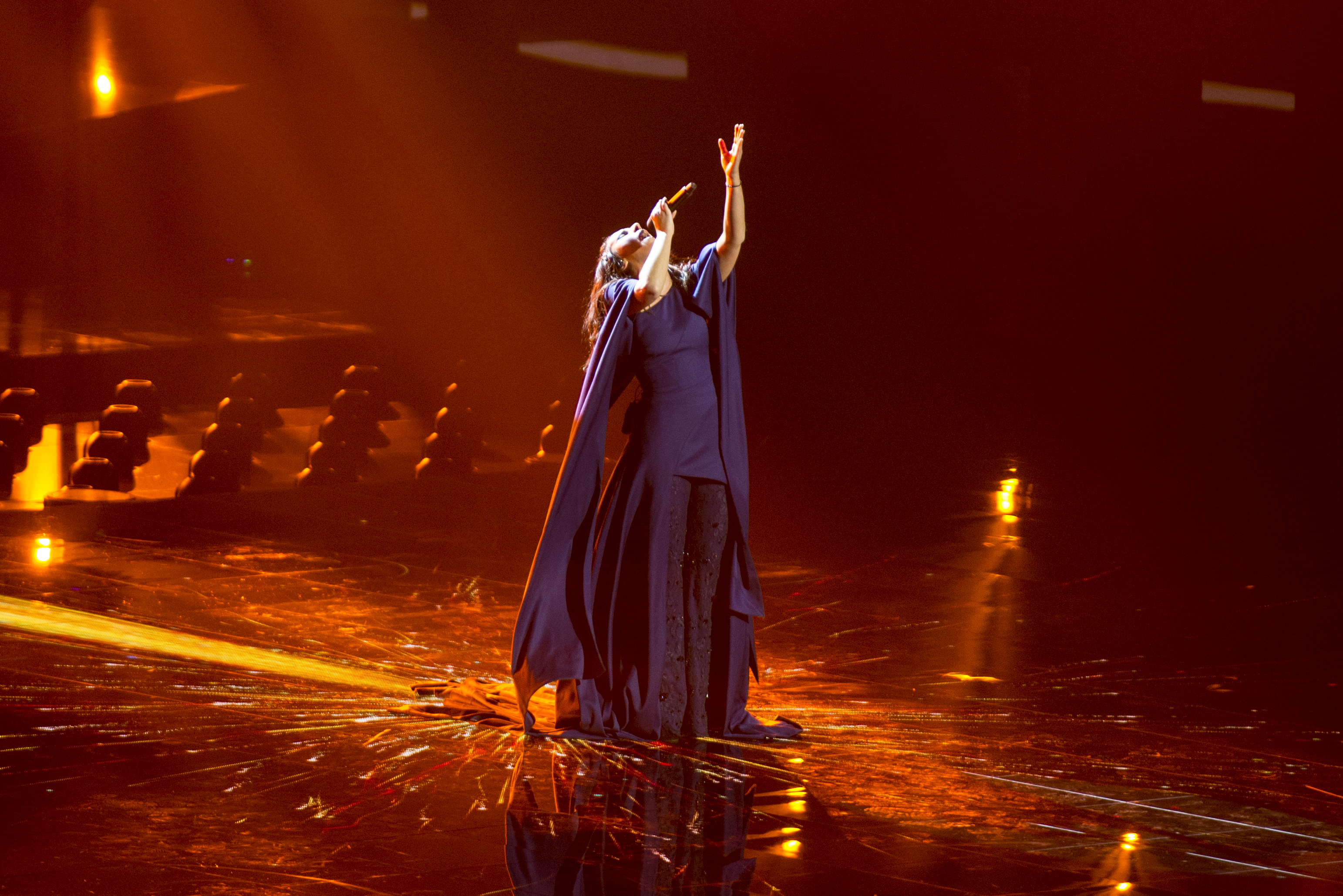
Jamala performing "1944" in Stockholm (2016)

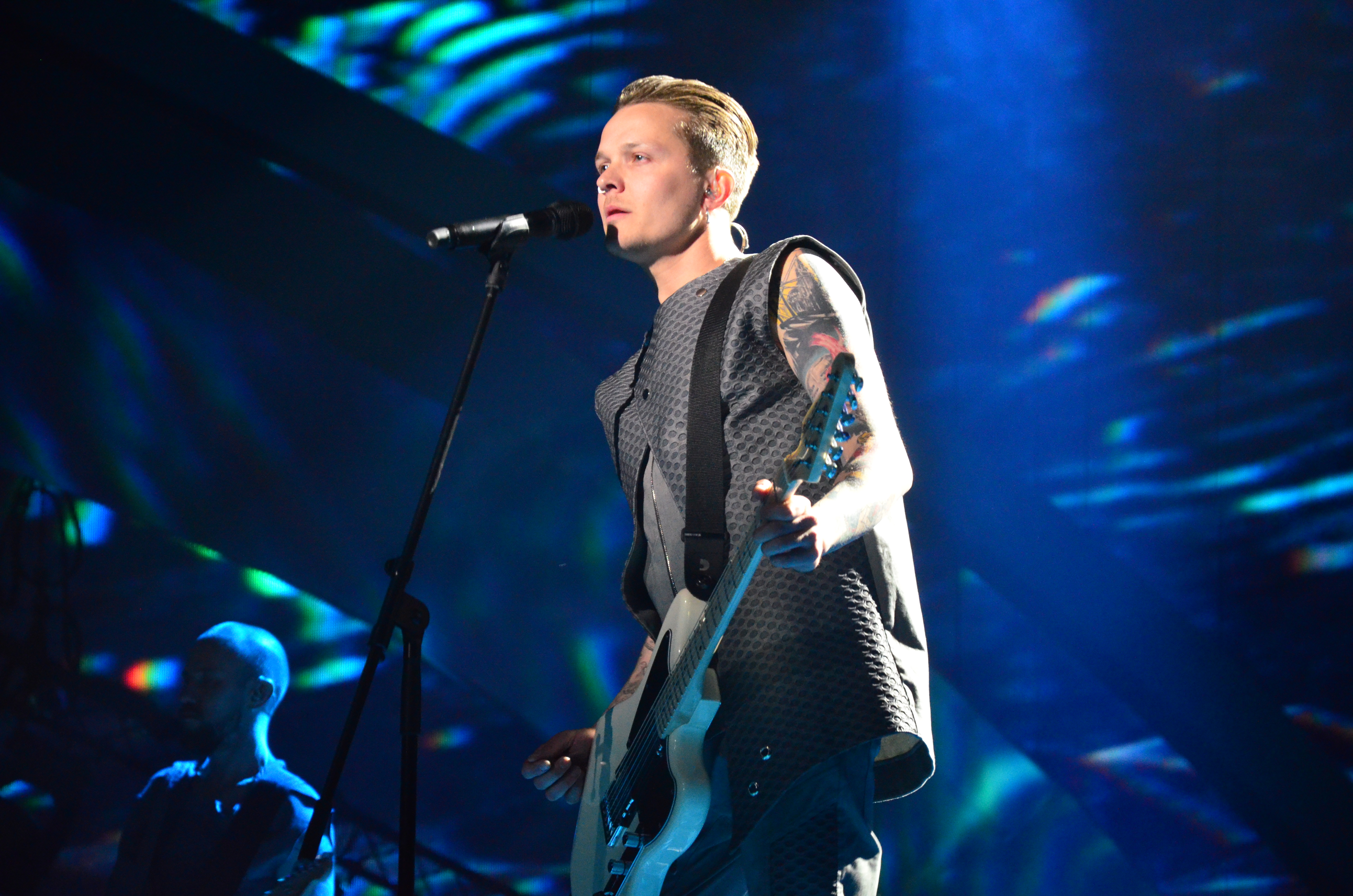
O.Torvald performing "Time" in Kyiv (2017)

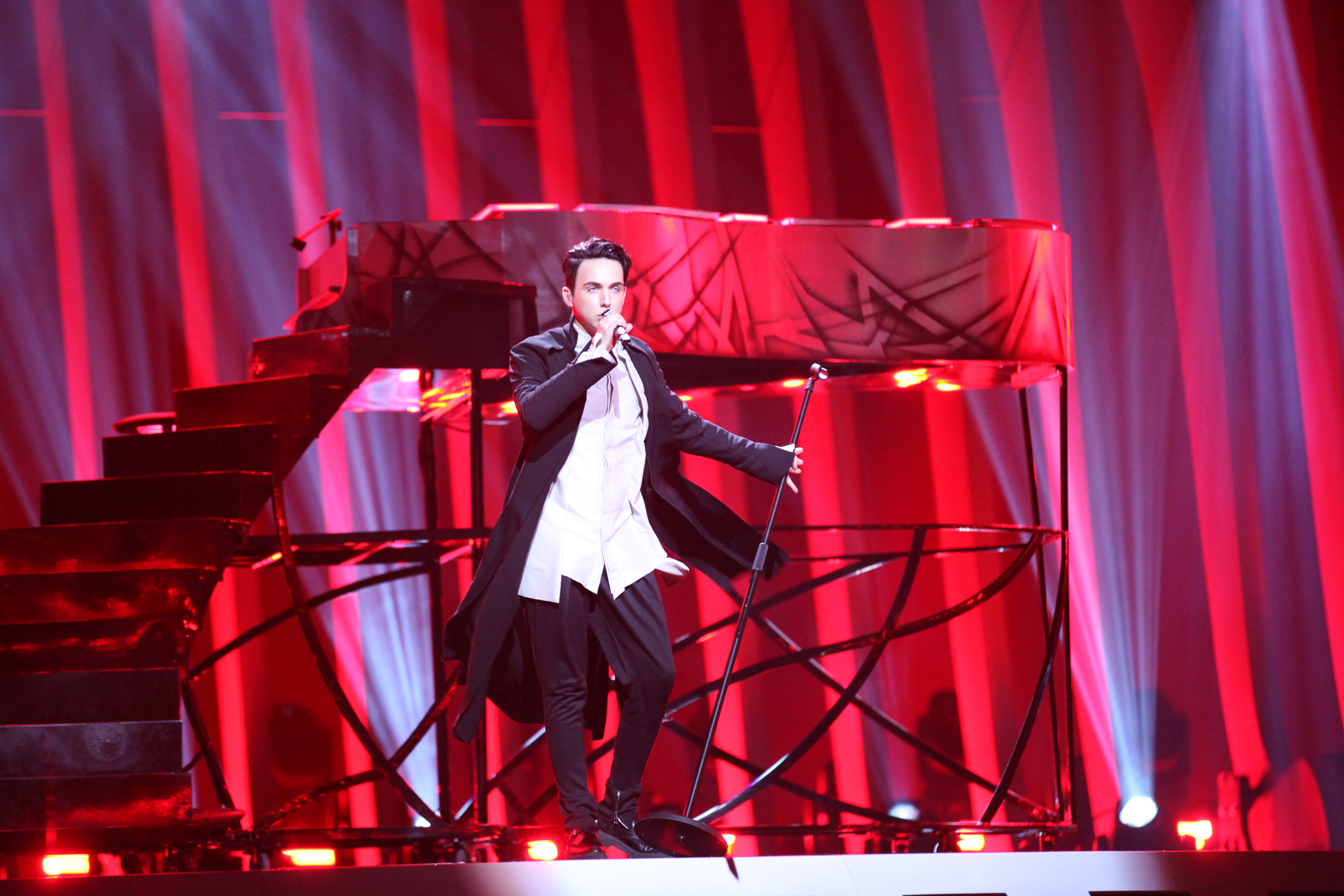
Mélovin performing "Under the Ladder" in Lisbon (2018)

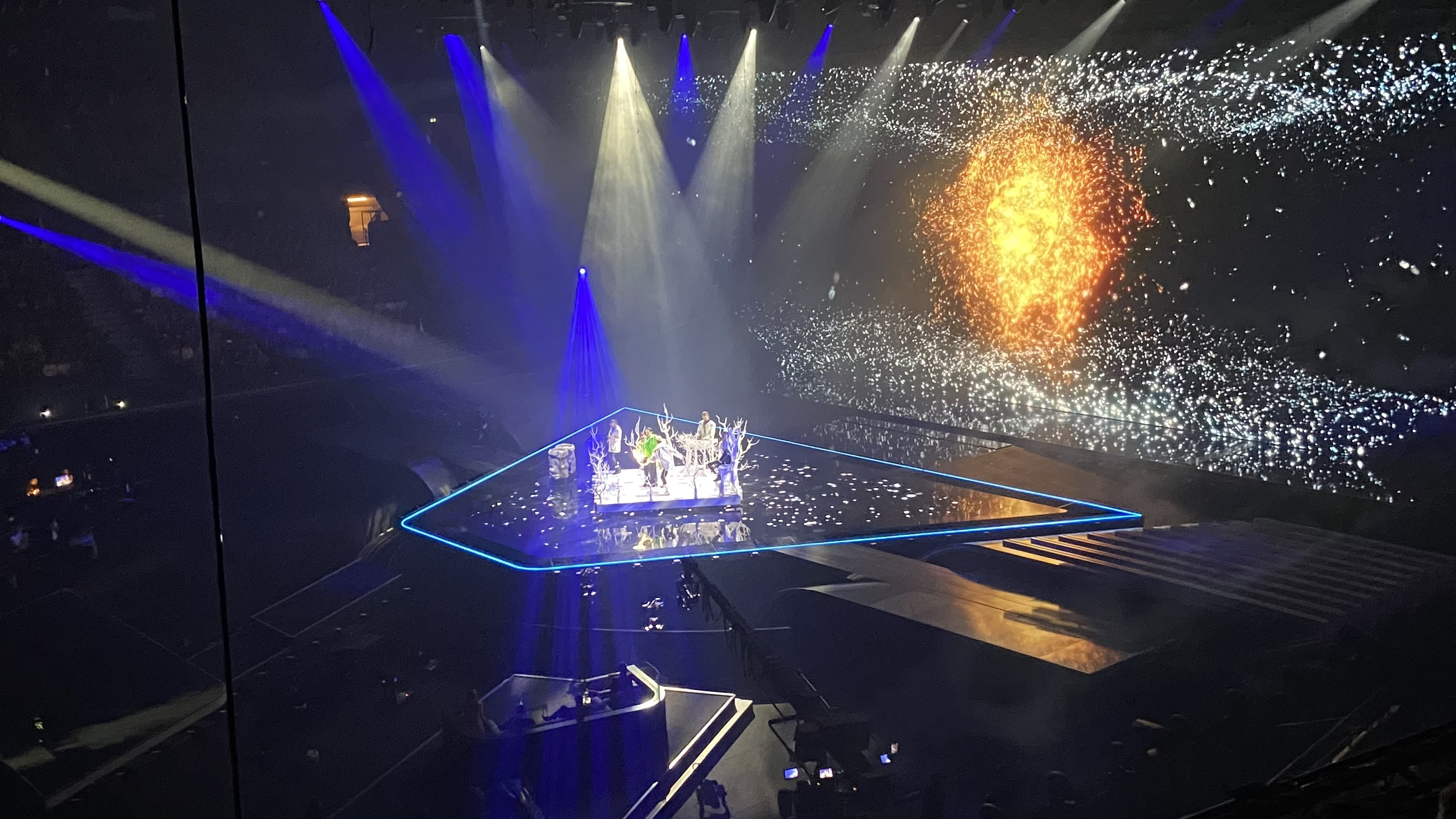
Go_A performing "Shum" in Rotterdam (2021)

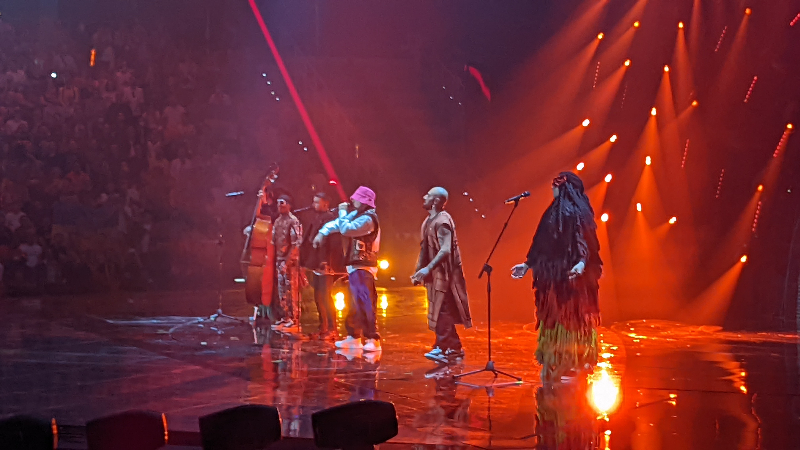
Kalush Orchestra performing "Stefania" in Turin (2022)

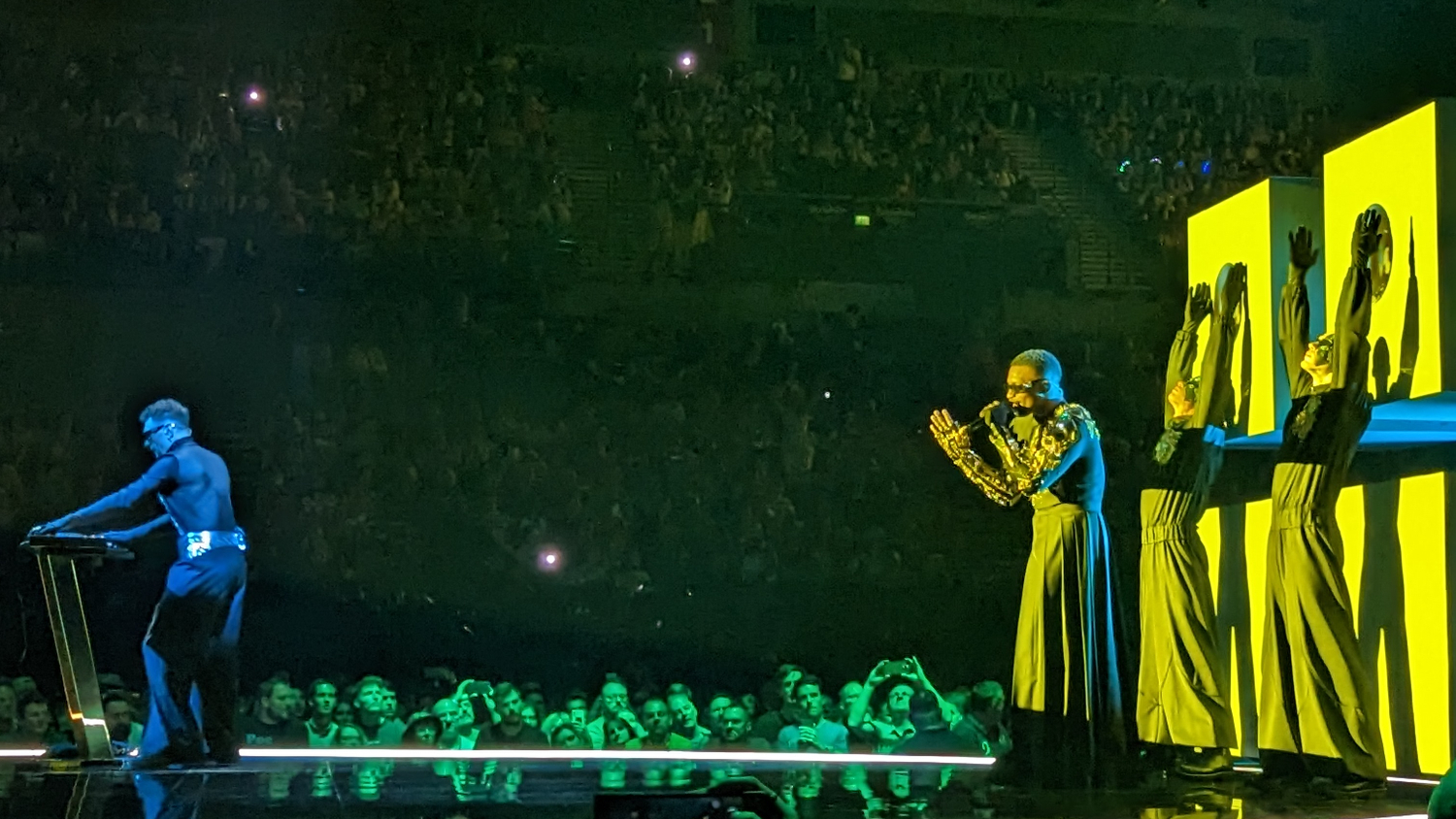
Tvorchi performing "Heart of Steel" in Liverpool (2023)

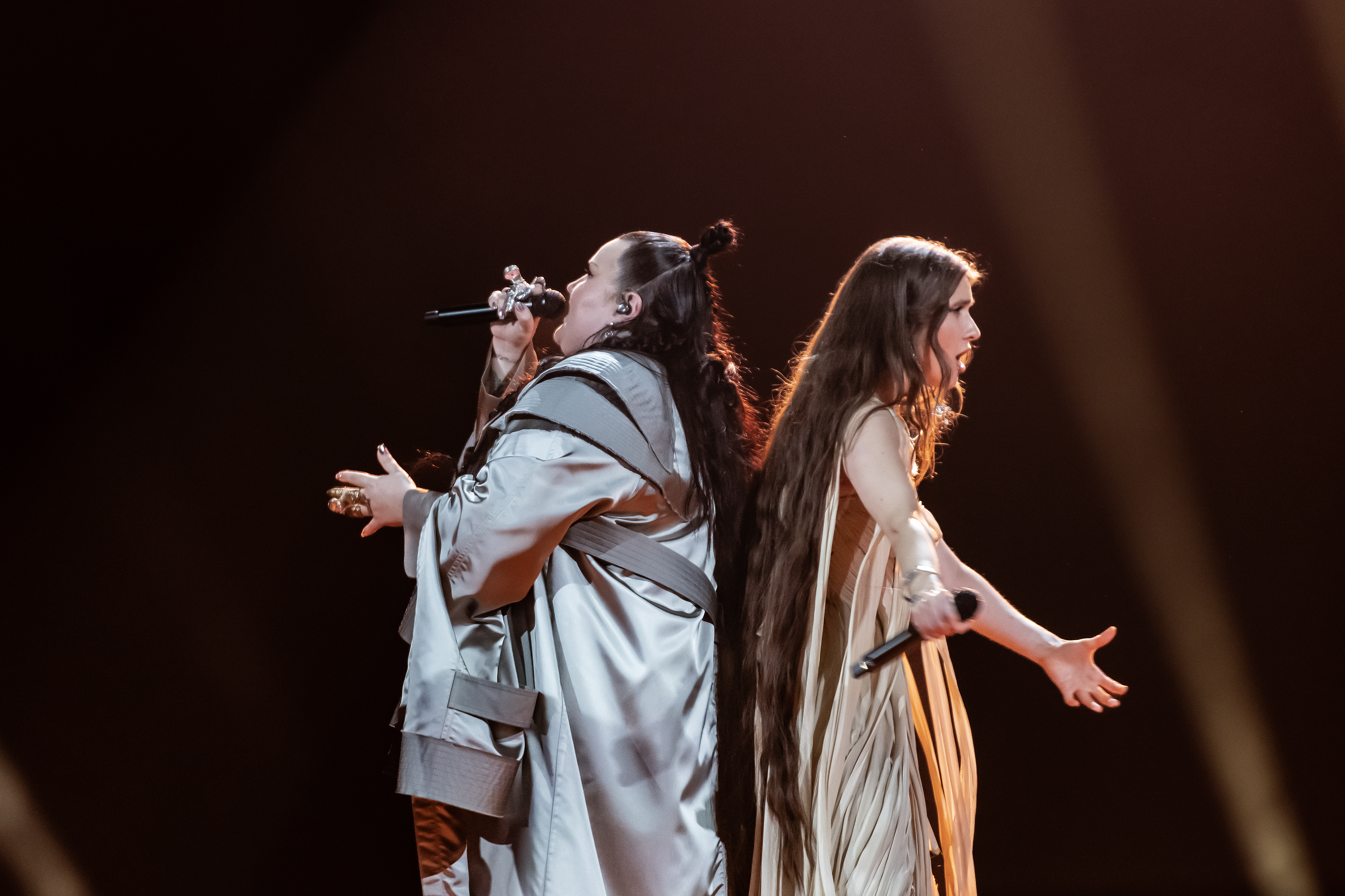
Alyona Alyona and Jerry Heil performing "Teresa & Maria" in Malmö (2024)

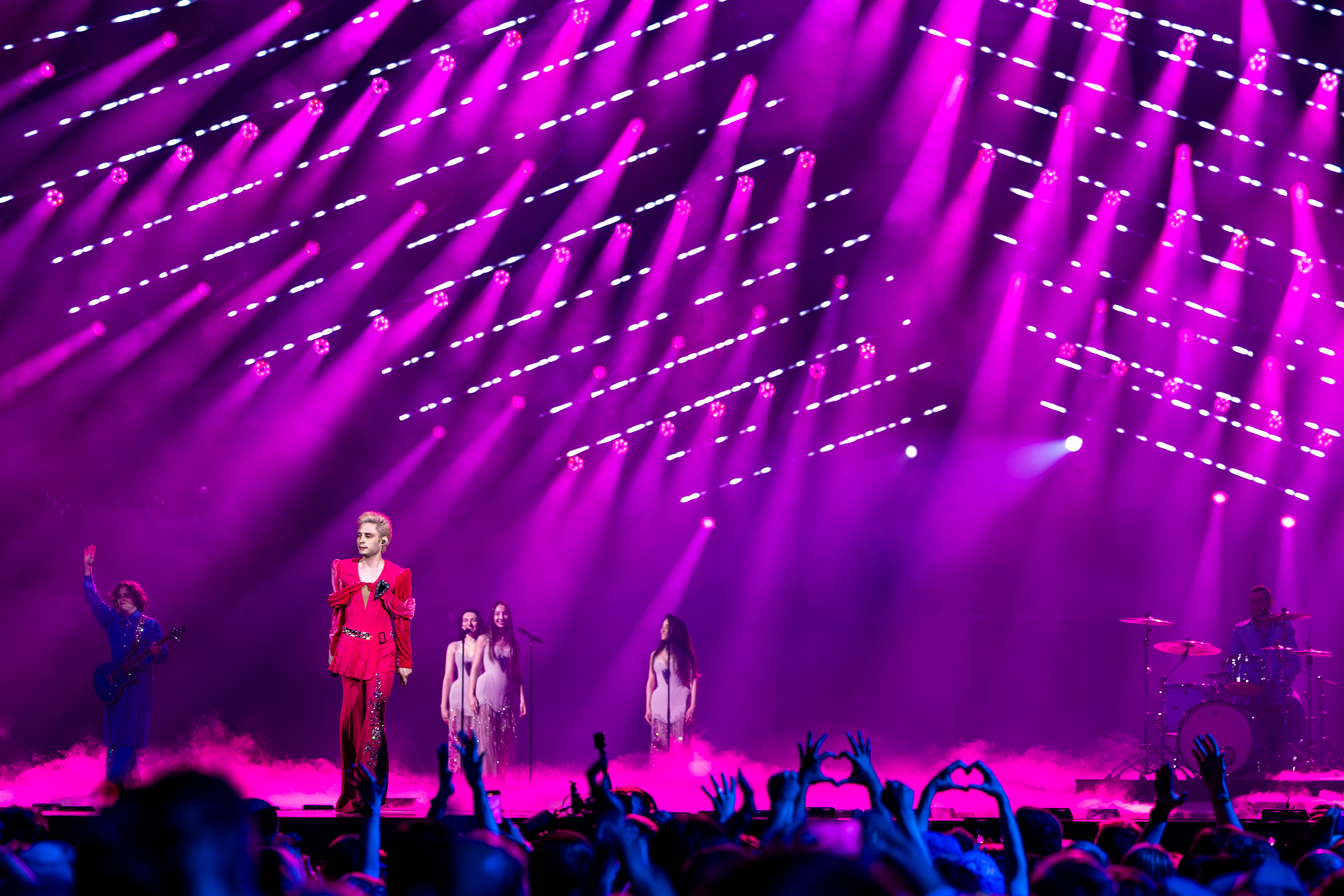
Ziferblat performing "Bird of Pray" in Basel (2025)

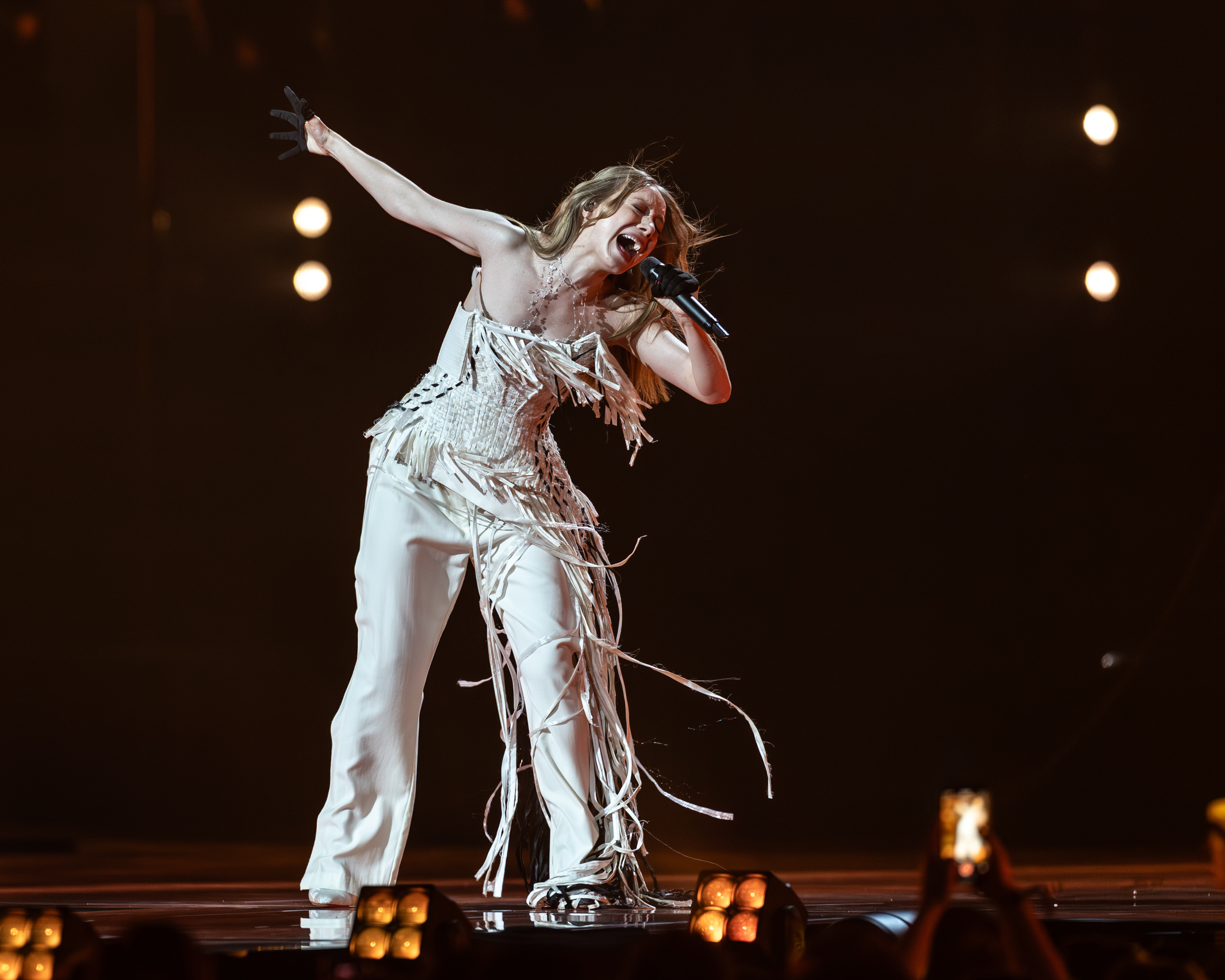
Leléka performing "Ridnym" in Vienna (2026)

== See also ==
- Ukraine in the Junior Eurovision Song Contest – Junior version of the Eurovision Song Contest.
- Russia–Ukraine relations in the Eurovision Song Contest – Relations between the two countries in the Junior and Senior Eurovision Song Contests.
