= Go A =

Ukrainian band

Go_A
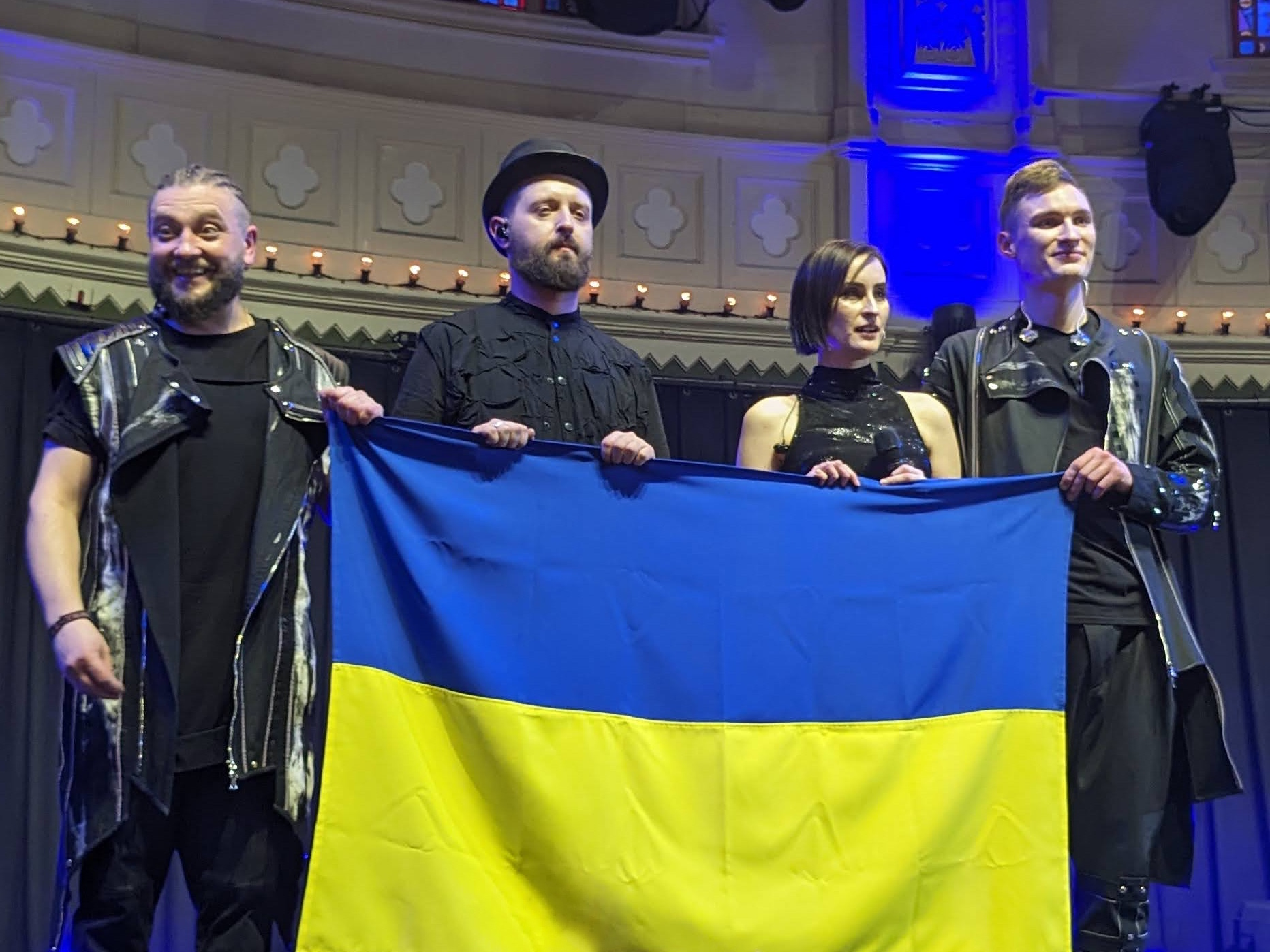
- Go_A at Paradiso in 2023

Background information
- Origin: Kyiv, Ukraine
- Genres: Folk rock; folktronica
- Years active: 2012–present
- Label: Moon Records Ukraine
- Members: Kateryna Pavlenko; Taras Shevchenko; Ihor Didenchuk; Ivan Hryhoriak
- Website: go-a-band.com

Go_A is a Ukrainian folktronica band formed in 2012, consisting of vocalist Kateryna Pavlenko from Nizhyn, keyboardist and percussionist Taras Shevchenko from Kyiv, Ihor Didenchuk from Lutsk (also a member of rap group Kalush), and Ivan Hryhoriak from Bukovyna. The band's name was made by combining the English word "Go" with the Greek letter "Alpha", which symbolizes the beginning of everything, and the band's name is symbolic for "return to the roots"; honouring this aim, they sing near-exclusively in Ukrainian. The band represented Ukraine in the Eurovision Song Contest 2021 with the song "Shum", placing fifth.

== History ==
The group was founded after keyboardist and percussionist Taras Shevchenko, not related to the poet of the same name, met folk singer Kateryna Pavlenko in 2012. In December 2012, the first song "Koliada" (Коляда) was released.

The band gained attention after the release of the single "Vesnianka" (Веснянка), which won the national competition The Best Track in Ukraine 2015. For six weeks, the song stayed at number one on the 10Dance chart of the Kiss FM radio station in Ukraine and was awarded Discovery of the Year by the radio station.

In November 2016, Go_A released their debut album Idy na zvuk (Іди на звук; Follow the Tune) via Moon Records Ukraine. The album consists of ten songs, including "Vesnjanka". In early 2017, they released a Christmas single "Shchedryi vechir" (Щедрий вечір) in collaboration with Katya Chilly.

=== Eurovision Song Contest (2020–21) ===
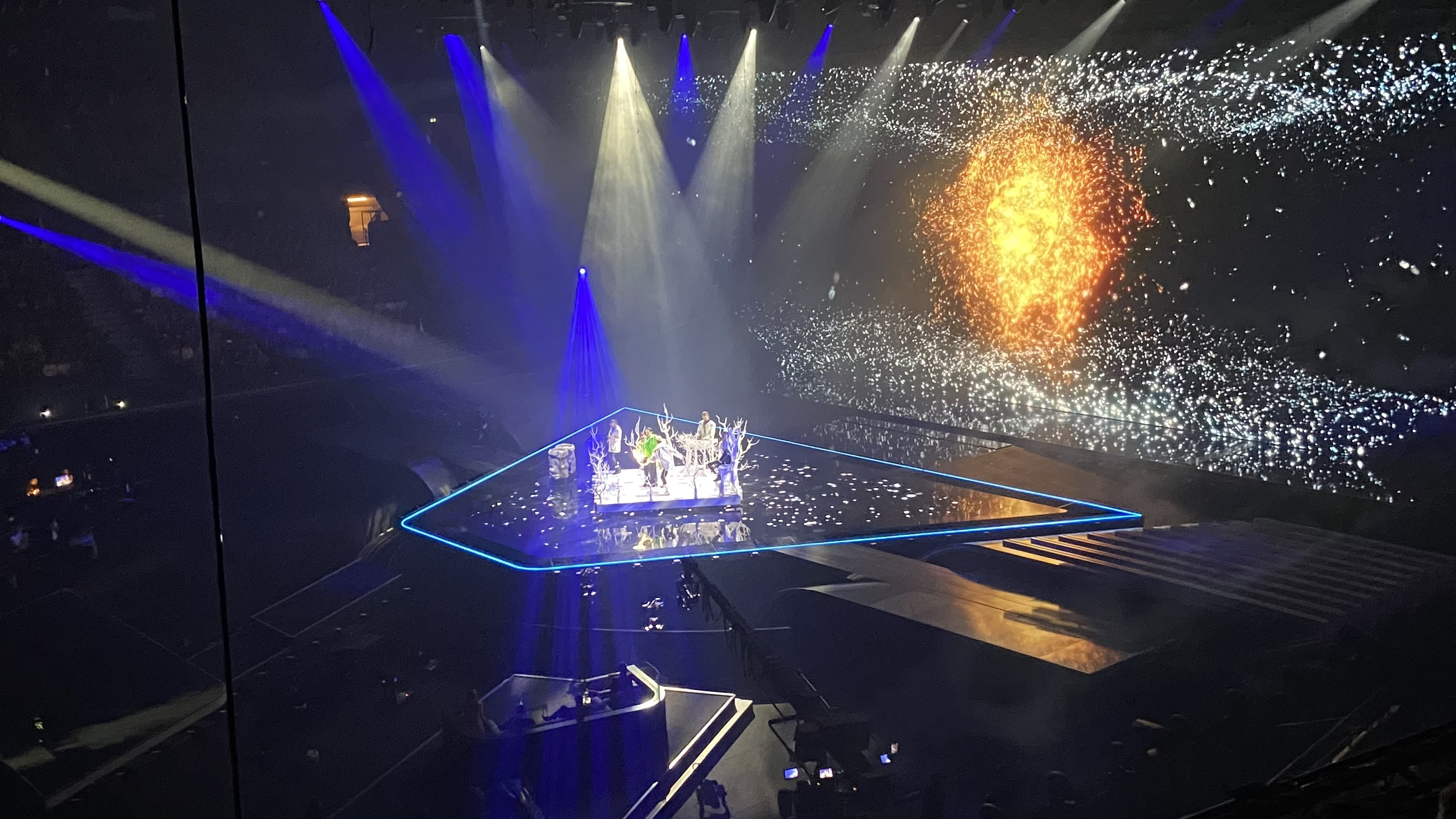
Go_A performing "Shum" in Rotterdam at the Eurovision Song Contest 2021

On 22 February 2020, Go_A, performing "Solovey", earned the right to represent Ukraine in the Eurovision Song Contest 2020 by winning both the public vote and the jury vote in the Ukrainian national final. The contest was cancelled due to the COVID-19 pandemic and Suspilne announced that the band would represent the country in the Eurovision Song Contest 2021. On 4 February 2021, it was announced that "Shum" would be the song that Go_A would be performing in Rotterdam at the Eurovision Song Contest. "Shum" placed fifth, with 364 combined public and jury points. However, in the public vote, "Shum" placed second with 267 points. Band member Ihor Didenchuk is also a member of rap group Kalush, which won the contest for Ukraine the following year.

=== Post-Eurovision Song Contest (2021–present) ===
The band played shows in Europe in late 2022 and early 2023. At the Eurovision Song Contest 2023, Go_A performed "Shum" during the flag parade in the show's final, alongside past Ukrainian entrants including Jamala, Tina Karol, and Verka Serduchka. They also appeared on stage during Duncan Laurence's performance of "You'll Never Walk Alone" during the interval.

== Members ==
- Kateryna Pavlenko – lead vocals
- Taras Shevchenko – keyboards, mixing, percussion
- Ihor Didenchuk – sopilka, percussion, upright bass, backing vocals
- Ivan Hryhoriak – guitars

== Discography ==
=== Albums ===
Title	Details	Peak chart positions
Title	Details	LTU
Idy na zvuk	Released: 1 November 2016; Format: Digital download; Label: Moon Records	56

=== Singles ===
Title	Year	Peak chart positions										Album
Title	Year	UKR Air	BEL (FL)	GER	IRE	LTU	NLD	SWE	SWI	UK	US Elec	Album
"Kolyada"	2012	—	—	—	—	—	—	—	—	—	—	Non-album single
"Vesnyanka"	2015	—	—	—	—	—	—	—	—	—	—	Idy na zvuk
"Shchedryy vechir" (with Katya Chilly)	2017	—	—	—	—	—	—	—	—	—	—	Non-album singles
"Rano-ranenko"	2019	—	—	—	—	—	—	—	—	—	—	Non-album singles
"Solovey"	2020	16	—	—	—	—	—	—	—	—	—	Non-album singles
"Dobrym lyudyam na zdorovya"	2020	—	—	—	—	—	—	—	—	—	—	Non-album singles
"Shum"	2021	17	29	66	37	3	19	27	36	59	20	Non-album singles
"Kalyna"	2022	—	—	—	—	—	—	—	—	—	—	Non-album singles
"Rusalochki"	2023	—	—	—	—	—	—	—	—	—	—	Non-album singles
"Vorozhyla"	2023	—	—	—	—	—	—	—	—	—	—	Dovbush (soundtrack)
"Dumala"	2023	—	—	—	—	—	—	—	—	—	—	Non-album singles
"Krip"	2024	—	—	—	—	—	—	—	—	—	—	Non-album singles
"—" denotes a recording that did not chart or was not released.

Awards and achievements
Preceded by Mélovin with "Under the Ladder"	Ukraine in the Eurovision Song Contest; 2020 (cancelled)	Succeeded by Themselves with "Shum"
Preceded by Themselves with "Solovey"	Ukraine in the Eurovision Song Contest; 2021	Succeeded by Kalush Orchestra with "Stefania"
