= Shum (song) =

2021 song by Go_A

Single by Go_A
- Released: 22 January 2021
- Genre: Dark-techno; folk
- Length: 3:58 (original version); 3:02 (radio edit); 2:53 (Eurovision version)
- Label: Rocksoulana
- Songwriters: Taras Shevchenko; Kateryna Pavlenko

Go_A singles chronology
"Solovey" (2020)	"Shum" (2021)	"Kalyna" (2022)

Alternative cover
- Eurovision version cover

Music video
- "Shum" (original version) on YouTube

Eurovision Song Contest 2021 entry
- Country: Ukraine
- Artist: Go_A
- Language: Ukrainian
- Composers: Taras Shevchenko; Kateryna Pavlenko; Ihor Didenchuk
- Lyricist: Kateryna Pavlenko

Finals performance
- Semi-final result: 2nd
- Semi-final points: 267
- Final result: 5th
- Final points: 364

Entry chronology
- ◄ "Solovey" (2020)
- "Stefania" (2022) ►

Music video
- "Shum" (Eurovision version) on YouTube

"Shum" (Ukrainian: «Шум», lit. 'Noise') is a song by Ukrainian electro-folk band Go_A. It represented Ukraine in the Eurovision Song Contest 2021 in Rotterdam. It is the second song sung entirely in Ukrainian to represent the country at Eurovision after Go_A's own "Solovey" in 2020, but the first to actually compete in Eurovision due to the cancellation of the 2020 contest.

"Shum" qualified for the 2021 Eurovision final, where it finished in fifth place with 364 points. They were the runner-ups of the public vote, behind eventual winner Italy, with 267 points, including a maximum of 12 points from five countries. The Eurovision version of the song took the lead in the global Spotify Viral 50 daily list on 24 May 2021, where it stayed until 1 June, and led the weekly list on the week of 27 May. It entered the Billboard Global 200 on the week of 5 June, at position 158, becoming the first ever Ukrainian-language song to chart there. On the same week, it peaked at number 80 on the Billboard Global Excl. U.S.

== Background ==
The lyrics of this song is a variation of Ukrainian folk songs which were sung in the Shum folk ritual. The ritual involved a game and was performed in spring. According to some ethnographers, Shum refers to the god or personification of the forest. Etymologically, the name of the ritual probably comes from Proto-Slavic words šumъ ("noise") or šuma ("forest").

Lead singer Kateryna Pavlenko grew up in Northern Ukraine, and the song is inspired by the folklore of that region.

== Music video ==
On 22 January 2021, Go_A presented a music video for the song on the band's YouTube channel. Less than three weeks later, it reached 1 million views. Pavlenko commented that the video was made with a phone camera and, despite the apparent pandemic theme, their intent was to just experiment and "shoot some funny video". For the Eurovision version, they shot a new music video in a forest near the Chernobyl Nuclear Power Plant.

== Eurovision Song Contest ==
The song was selected to represent Ukraine in the Eurovision Song Contest 2021 on 4 February 2021, after Go_A was internally selected by the national broadcaster UA:PBC. The previous year, they had won Vidbir 2020, Ukraine's televised national selection. The semi-finals of the 2021 contest featured the same line-up of countries as determined by the draw for the 2020 contest's semi-finals. Ukraine was placed into the first semi-final, held on 18 May 2021, and performed in the second half of the show.

=== Eurovision version ===
In March, a new version of the song was released with a new music video. The original version was too long and borrowed lyrics from existing traditional songs, which is prohibited under Eurovision rules. Pavlenko noted that the band struggled to cut the original version of the song to three minutes, so they decided to come up with a 'sequel'. Pavlenko explained that the original "Shum" was not written with Eurovision in mind and was intended for their concert tour after the cancelled Eurovision 2020. The purpose of the original track was to recreate the folk ritual at live performances with their audience.

The new version of the song was adapted for Eurovision and is based on vesnianka folk songs. In Pavlenko's words, it was intended to have "more positive energy", since the original version, which is based on the folk ritual, is "a bit tense".

== Track listing ==
Digital download/streaming – Original version

1. "Шум" – 3:59

Digital download/streaming – Radio edit

1. "Шум" (radio edit) – 3:03

Digital download/streaming – Eurovision version

1. "Shum" – 2:53

Digital download/streaming – DJ Nana remix

1. "Shum" (DJ Nana remix) – 2:33

Digital download/streaming – Billx remix

1. "Shum" (Billx remix) – 4:24

== Charts ==
=== Weekly charts ===
Weekly chart performance for "Shum"
Chart (2021)	Peak position
Austria (Ö3 Austria Top 40)	35
Belgium (Ultratop 50 Flanders)	29
Czech Republic Singles Digital (ČNS IFPI)	55
Finland (Suomen virallinen lista)	17
Germany (GfK)	66
Global 200 (Billboard)	158
Greece (IFPI)	8
Iceland (Tónlistinn)	11
Ireland (IRMA)	37
Lithuania (AGATA)	3
Netherlands (Single Top 100)	19
Slovakia (Singles Digitál Top 100)	61
Sweden (Sverigetopplistan)	27
Switzerland (Schweizer Hitparade)	36
Ukraine Airplay (TopHit)	41
UK Singles (Official Charts)	59
UK Dance (Official Charts)	18
UK Indie (Official Charts)	8
US Hot Dance/Electronic Songs (Billboard)	20
US World Digital Song Sales (Billboard)	3

=== Year-end charts ===
2021 year-end chart performance for "Shum"
Chart (2021)	Position
Ukraine Airplay (Tophit)	145

2022 year-end chart performance for "Shum"
Chart (2022)	Position
Ukraine Airplay (TopHit)	141

2023 year-end chart performance for "Shum"
Chart (2023)	Position
Ukraine Airplay (TopHit)	135

== Certifications ==
Certifications for "Shum"
Region	Certification	Certified units/sales
Poland (ZPAV)	Gold	25,000^{‡}
^{‡} Sales+streaming figures based on certification alone.

== Release history ==
Release history for "Shum"
Region	Date	Format	Label
Various	22 January 2021	Digital download; streaming	Self-released
