= Assol (disambiguation) =

Assol is the female protagonist in the novel Scarlet Sails by Alexander Grin and derived works.

Assol or ASSOL may also refer to:

- Assol, a 1965 opera by Eugen Kapp
- Assol, a 1982 animated film by Boris Stepantsev
- Daewoo Lanos, a 1997–2002 South Korean subcompact car, sold in Russia as the Doninvest Assol

== People ==
- Assol, former stage name of Swoiia (born 1994), Ukrainian singer
- Assol Slivets (born 1982), Belarusian, and later Russian freestyle skier
- Assol Abdullina, Kyrgyzstan-born American actress, and screenwriter, who received an award for the 2020 film Materna
