= Solovey (Go A song) =

2020 single by Go_A

Single by Go_A
- Released: 4 February 2020
- Genre: Folktronica
- Length: 2:55
- Songwriters: Taras Shevchenko; Kateryna Pavlenko

Go_A singles chronology
"Рано-Раненько" (2019)	"Solovey" (2020)	"Шум" (2021)

Eurovision Song Contest 2020 entry
- Country: Ukraine
- Artist: Go_A
- Language: Ukrainian
- Composers: Taras Shevchenko; Kateryna Pavlenko
- Lyricist: Kateryna Pavlenko

Finals performance
- Semi-final result: Contest cancelled

Entry chronology
- ◄ "Siren Song" (2019)
- "Shum" (2021) ►

"Solovey" (Ukrainian: «Соловей», lit. 'Nightingale') is a song by Ukrainian electro-folk band Go_A. It was set to represent Ukraine in the Eurovision Song Contest 2020 in Rotterdam before the contest was cancelled due to the COVID-19 pandemic. It would have been the first song sung entirely in Ukrainian to represent the country at Eurovision.

== Background ==
The musical genre of the song is folktronica, a mix between electronic dance music and folk.

The song lyrics are about a girl, Katrusia (nickname for "Kateryna"), who lives in the Ukrainian countryside. She falls in love with a boy named Vaniusha (nickname for "Ivan"), but the two lovers have to meet in secret at night, because, if the mother found out about their relationship, they would have to break up. The girl begs a nightingale not to sing too early, otherwise the bird could wake up other people. Katrusia eventually realises the impossibility of their love and tries to forget him.

The story is based on the lead singer Kateryna Pavlenko's personal story.

The lyrics, all in the Ukrainian language, are written in an iambic pentameter verse, which is the main metre in Slavic folk poetry and drama.

== Eurovision Song Contest ==
The song was selected to represent Ukraine in the Eurovision Song Contest 2020, after Go_A was chosen through Vidbir 2020, the music competition that selects Ukraine's entries for the Eurovision Song Contest. On 28 January 2020, a special allocation draw was held which placed each country into one of the two semi-finals, as well as which half of the show they would perform in. Ukraine was placed into the first semi-final, to be held on 12 May 2020, and was scheduled to perform in the second half of the show.

It was announced on 18 March 2020 that, due to the 2020 pandemic of Coronavirus, the Eurovision Song Contest for 2020 would not go ahead. Tentatively, the national broadcasters have stated that no further national selection will take place in Ukraine next year and Go_A will be allowed to return as the Ukrainian entry for Eurovision 2021. According to the rules of the competition, Go_A would have to create a new song for the 2021 competition, which they did with "Shum."

== Charts ==
Chart (2020)	Peak position
Ukraine Airplay (TopHit)	14

== Release history ==
Region	Date	Format	Label	Ref.
Various	5 February 2020	Digital download, streaming	Self-released	
