= Monokate =

Ukrainian singer, composer and folklorist (born 1988)

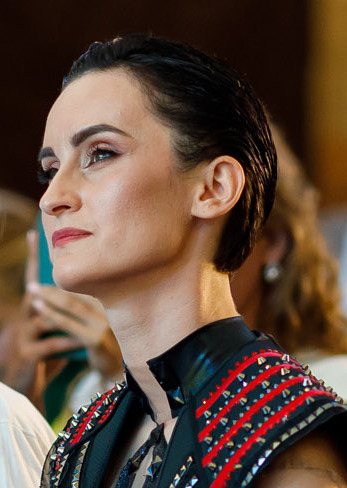
- Pavlenko in 2022

Background information
- Born: Kateryna Anatoliivna Pavlenko; 10 August 1988 (age 37); Nizhyn, Ukrainian SSR, Soviet Union (now Ukraine)
- Genres: World; folk; rock; trip hop
- Instrument: Vocals
- Years active: 2009–present

Kateryna Anatoliivna Pavlenko (Ukrainian: Катерина Анатоліївна Павленко, IPA: [kɐteˈrɪnɐ ɐnɐˈtɔl⁽ʲ⁾ijiu̯nɐ pɐu̯ˈlɛnko]; born 10 August 1988), also known as Monokate (Ukrainian: Монокейт), is a Ukrainian singer, composer, and folklorist. She is the lead vocalist of the Ukrainian electro-folk band Go_A, who would have represented Ukraine at Eurovision Song Contest 2020 with their song "Solovey". After the cancellation of the contest due to the COVID-19 pandemic, they represented Ukraine in 2021 with "Shum".

In June 2021, Pavlenko entered the top 100 most influential women in Ukraine according to Focus magazine, where she took 10th place. She competed as a solo artist in the Ukrainian national final for the Eurovision Song Contest 2026 with the song "Tut", finishing in sixth place out of ten.

== Early life ==
Pavlenko was born on August 10, 1988, in Nizhyn, Chernihiv Oblast, a city north-east of Kyiv (at the time in the Ukrainian SSR of the Soviet Union). Her mother worked an unpaid job in the military which meant her family was poor and, at one point, homeless. She was surrounded by folk music from an early age. Her grandmother was a singer and taught her the traditional style of singing known as 'white voice' and her grandfather played the accordion. Her mother also sang in a folk choir.

During her time at school she studied singing and was encouraged by her teachers to become an opera singer, however she realised she wanted to become a rock musician. She was in a local rock band as a teen and performed in several concerts.

== Education ==
Pavlenko studied at the Nizhyn School of Culture and Arts, graduating in 2009. She then went on to study folklore at the Kyiv National University of Culture and Arts, graduating in 2013.

== Career ==
Pavlenko has directed multiple folk ensembles, including the veterans choir in Berezan, Kyiv Oblast. She is the lead singer of the band Go_A, and has written and published her own music under her pseudonym, Monokate.

On August 24, 2023, Pavlenko, under the pseudonym Monokate, released "Vorozhyla", a soundtrack to the Ukrainian action drama film Dovbush, in which she also played the role of a Carpathian molfar.

On November 24, 2025, Suspilne revealed the 15-act long list for Vidbir 2026, including Pavlenko, under the pseudonym Monokate. She competed with the song "Tut (song)" (stylized as "TYT"), where she ultimately placed 6th in the final.

== Go_A ==
Pavlenko originally joined the electro-folk band Go_A as a backup singer in 2012, but she is now the lead singer. Their first single, "Koliada" (Ukrainian: Коляда), came out in 2012, but the band didn't gain much recognition until 2015, when they released "Vesnyanka" (Ukrainian: Веснянка), which was number one in the 10Dance chart of the Ukrainian Kiss FM radio station, and was elected 'discovery of the year' by the same radio station. Their debut album Idy Na Zvuk (Ukrainian: Іди на звук) was released in 2016.

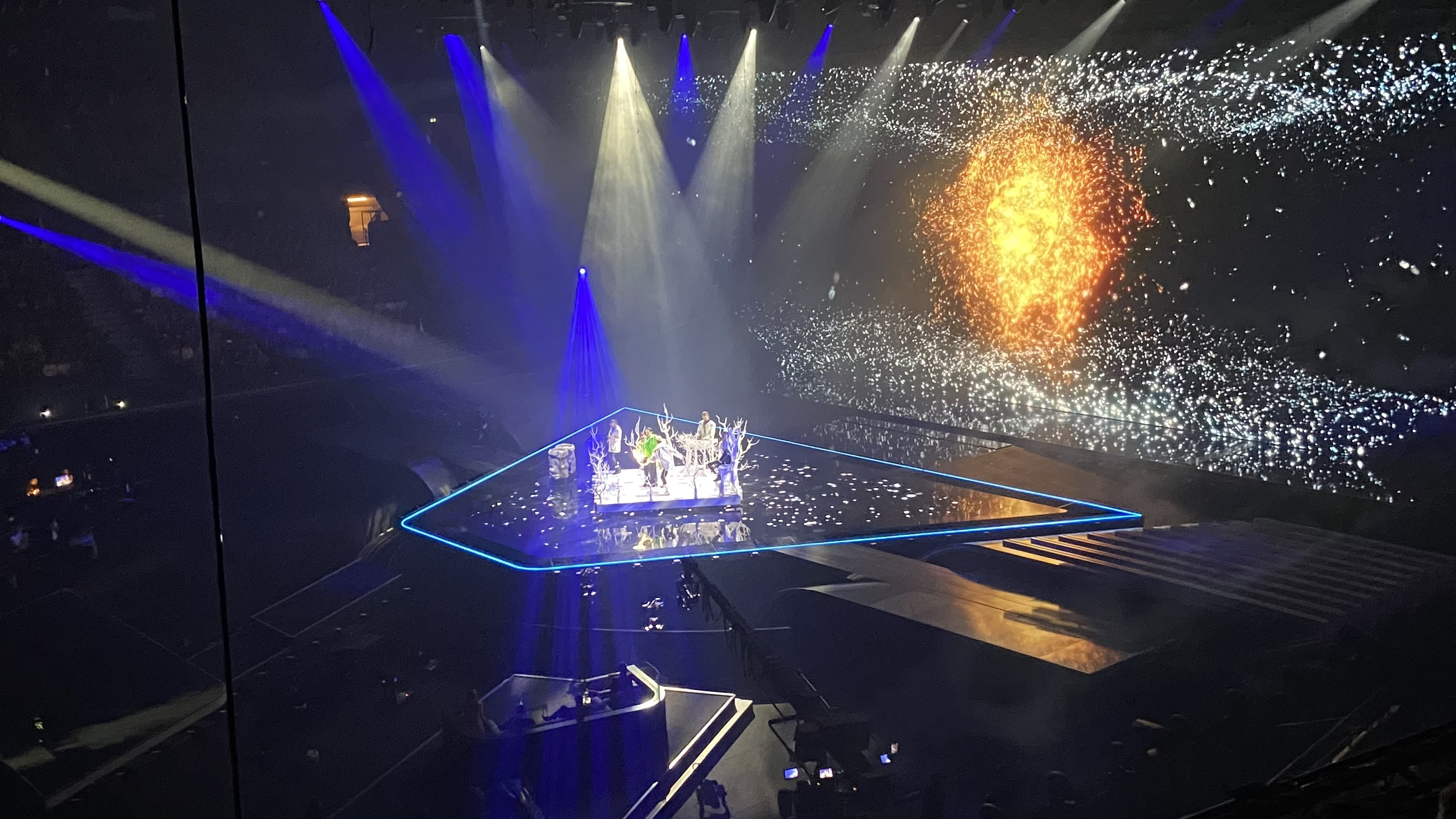
Go_A performing "Shum" in Rotterdam at the Eurovision Song Contest 2021

=== Eurovision Song Contest ===
In early 2020, Pavlenko, along with the band, competed in Vidbir 2020, the Ukrainian National Selection for the Eurovision Song Contest 2020 with the song "Solovey". In the final, they won both the jury and televote which meant they would represent Ukraine at Eurovision 2020 but due to the COVID-19 pandemic, the competition was cancelled.

Go_A represented Ukraine the next year at Eurovision 2021 with the song "Shum". They placed 5th overall, but came 2nd in the public vote. "Shum" reached 1st place in the global Spotify Viral 50 on May 24.

Pavlenko was also the Ukrainian jury spokesperson at the Eurovision Song Contest 2022. She awarded the United Kingdom their first twelve-point vote since 2017.

== Discography ==
=== Singles ===
Year	Name	Album	Ref.
2019	"Svit Song" (with Dan Alien and Blueberry)	Non-album singles	
2021	"Play/Rec" (with Dan Alien and Blueberry)	Non-album singles	
2023	"Vorozhyla"	Dovbush Soundtrack	
2026	"Tut"	Non-album single	

=== As featured artist ===
Year	Name	Album	Ref.
2021	"More" («Море») (Igor Kirilenko featuring Monokate)	111111111111111111111111111111	

== Filmography ==
Year	Title	Role	Notes	Ref.
2021	MonoKate	Herself	Television documentary by Suspilne	
2023	Dovbush	Carpathian molfar		
