= Katya Chilly =

Ukrainian singer (born 1978)

- Born: Kateryna Petrivna Kondratenko; 12 July 1978 (age 48); Kyiv, Ukrainian SSR, USSR
- Genres: Folk; world; new-age; dance; pop; rock; jazz
- Occupations: singer; songwriter; actress
- Years active: 1996–present
- Labels: Zone Records; Ukrainian Records

Kateryna Petrivna Kondratenko (Ukrainian: Катерина Петрівна Кондратенко; born 12 July 1978), known professionally as Katya Chilly, is a Ukrainian singer and songwriter. Her style is a fusion of world and new-age music.

== Biography ==
Katya Chilly's debut album Rusalki in da House (Mermaids In Da House) was released in 1998. She started preparing material for the album in 1996 when she changed her stage name to Katya Chilly.

In 1999, Katya Chilly took part in the Scotland Edinburgh Festival Fringe. In March 2001, she performed at more than 40 concerts in the United Kingdom. A part of her performance was also broadcast by the BBC throughout the country.

In 2000, Katya started working on her second album called Son (Dream). It was planned to be released in 2002 but the project was cancelled. However, this album has been informally distributed on the Internet.

Katya's single "Pivni" (Roosters), in collaboration with Ukrainian Records/Andrey Dakhovsky, was released in June 2005. It included the title track and remixes made by prominent Ukrainian DJs (DJ Lemon, DJ Tkach, DJ Professor Moriarti, and others).

Katya Chilly released her next album eight years after her first. On 10 March 2006 Ukrainian Records released the third album, Ya Molodaya (I Am Young).

In October 2007, Katya joined the DJuice music tour and visited seven Ukrainian cities.

MTV's Ukrainian website announced that the fourth album, Prosto Serdtse (Simply Heart), would be released in October 2007. However, in an interview for galainfo.com.ua, Katya stated that the release would be postponed until 2008. It remains unreleased.

In 2017, she participated in the seventh season of The Voice of Ukraine.

In 2020, she participated in the Ukrainian National Selection for Eurovision Song Contest 2020 with the song "Pich" but she did not qualify for the final.

== Discography ==
- 1998 – Rusalki in da House
- 2002 – Son
- 2006 – Ya Molodaya
- 2008 – Prosto Serdtse
