= Swoiia =

Ukrainian singer (born 1994)

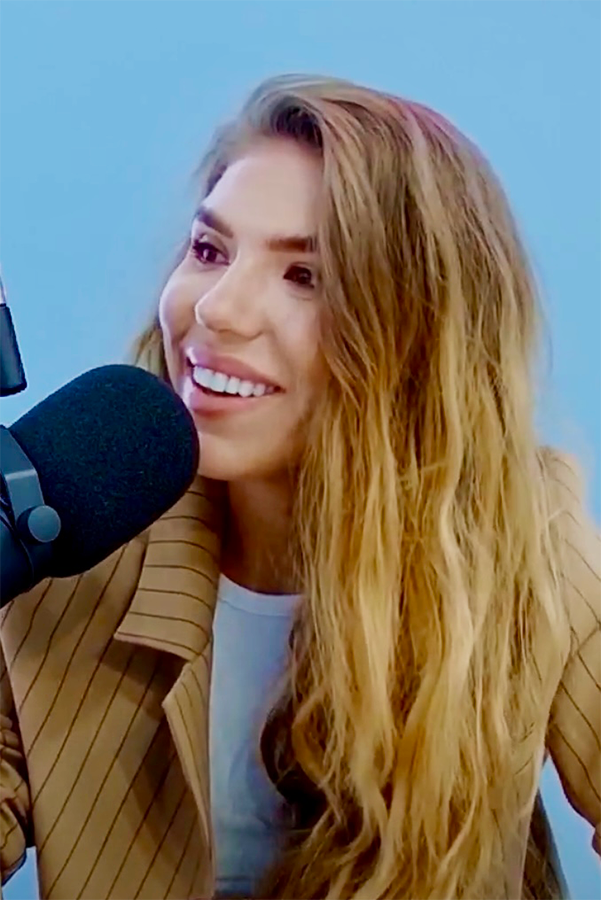
- Swoiia, 2023

Background information
- Also known as: Assol, Assol'ka
- Born: Kateryna Ihorivna Humenyuk; 4 July 1994 (age 32); Donetsk, Ukraine
- Origin: Ukraine
- Genres: pop, R&B
- Occupation: Singer
- Instruments: Vocals, piano
- Years active: 2000–present
- Labels: Moon, Best Music

Kateryna Ihorivna Taranenko (Ukrainian: Катерина Ігорівна Тараненко; née Humenyuk [Гуменюк]; born 4 July 1994), known professionally as Swoiia (from своя, 'one's own') and until 2023 as Assol (Ассоль), is a Ukrainian singer. In 2016, she participated in the Ukrainian edition of The Voice.

== Career ==
Humenyuk first performed on stage at the age of three. She has since appeared in several television music shows and in a television series by Svetlana Druzhinina. In 2000, she won the children's competition in Slavianski Bazaar in Vitebsk and released her debut album.

In 2016, she took part in Holos Krainy, the Ukrainian edition of The Voice.

As Assol, she took part in the Ukrainian preselection for the Eurovision Song Contest 2020 with the song "Save It". She was included in the longlist of participants of the Ukrainian preselection for the Eurovision Song Contest 2024 with the song "Little Angels"; a public vote determined her non-qualification to the final.

Humenyuk currently resides in Kyiv.

== Discography ==
=== Albums ===
- 2000 — Alye parusa
- 2002 — Vkraino moya
- 2008 — O tebe
- 2010 — Tayut guby
- 2017 — Letopis

=== Single ===
- 2010 – Ya ne predam
- 2020 – Save It
