= Anna Zakletska-Burak =

Ukrainian TV presenter, politician, public activist and singer

- Born: 25 June 1984 (age 41)
- Occupations: Television presenter Singer; Psychotherapist; Choreographer; Producer; Model
- Website: https://annazakletska.com/

Anna Anatoliyivna Zakletska-Burak (Ukrainian: Анна Анатоліївна Заклецька-Бурак; born 25 June 1984) is a Ukrainian TV presenter, singer, politician, public activist, and singer in the duo "Vroda". She spent time working as a scriptwriter, stage director, presenter, model, event manager, and choreographer in the children's ensemble, "Zernyatko".

== Early life ==
Anna was born in Kyiv. Her father was an engineer and her mother was a professional singer. From age three, Anna performed in the children's ensemble, "Kiyanochka".

- From 1993–1994, she studied in Newlands Manor School of Seaford, UK.
- In 1999, she graduated from the Kyiv music school No 37, piano class.
- In 2001, she graduated from the Kyiv School No 211 with an English language and literature degree.
- In 2005, she received a bachelor's degree in political science from National University "Kyiv Mohyla Academy", Ukraine.
- In 2006, she received a master's degree in political science from Taras Shevchenko National University of Ukraine.
- In 2010, she continued her education, studying psychology and psychotherapy at Moscow Gestalt Institute.

== Zernyatko ==
In 1990, her mother founded "Zernyatko", where Anna continued performing. Anna developed skills as a presenter, scriptwriter, stage director, songwriter and pedagogue during her time with "Zernyatko".

== Political career ==
Anna was involved in politics since early childhood, due to her parents. Traveling around the world with "Zernyatko" enabled her to meet politicians and ambassadors. Anna decided to bring her experiences to her home country. Since 2000, Anna has been one of the organizers of the "European Youth Camp," annually hosted by one of five European nations. In 2006, Anna was the organizing committee president of the "European Youth Camp" in Kyiv, Ukraine. From 2003 to 2009, Anna was a member of the "Ukrainian Youth SOBOR," a youth organization. As vice-president of SOBOR, from 2005 to 2009, she was in charge of obtaining membership in LYMEC. During the Orange Revolution, Anna was an intern of the Press Centre, working for Viktor Yushchenko. Since 2011, she has been a member of liberal ideology, Ukraine of the Future. where she served as international secretary.

=== Other activity ===
In 1996, Anna was a presenter for a children's movie festival. Since that time, she's been invited to serve as a presenter or MC for private and public events including parties, festivals and concerts. She worked in songwriting, script-writing, stage direction and event management.

== Personal life ==
Zakletska has three children: son Lyubomir, born in 2011, and daughters Zoryana and Eva, born in 2017 and 2019, respectively.
