= Ukraine in the Eurovision Song Contest 2020 =

- Eurovision Song Contest 2020
- Participating broadcaster: Public Broadcasting Company of Ukraine (UA:PBC)
- Country: Ukraine
- Selection process: Vidbir 2020
- Selection date: 22 February 2020

Competing entry
- Song: "Solovey"
- Artist: Go_A
- Songwriters: Taras Shevchenko; Kateryna Pavlenko

Placement
- Final result: Contest cancelled

Participation chronology

Ukraine was set to be represented at the Eurovision Song Contest 2020 with the song "Solovey" written by Taras Shevchenko and Kateryna Pavlenko. The song was performed by the band Go_A. Ukraine returned to the Eurovision Song Contest, after the nation withdrew in 2019 due to contractual disagreements with their chosen representative Maruv on conditions of taking part in the Ukrainian delegation. The Ukrainian broadcaster Public Broadcasting Company of Ukraine (UA:PBC) organised a national final in collaboration with commercial broadcaster STB in order to select the Ukrainian entry for the 2020 contest in Rotterdam, Netherlands. The national selection consisted of two semi-finals, held on 8 and 15 February 2020, and a final, held on 22 February 2020; eight entries competed in each semi-final with the top three from each semi-final advancing to the final. In the final, "Solovey" performed by Go_A was selected as the winner following the combination of votes from a three-member jury panel and a public televote.

Ukraine was drawn to compete in the first semi-final of the Eurovision Song Contest which took place on 12 May 2020. However, the contest was cancelled due to the COVID-19 pandemic. Go_A would go on to represent Ukraine in the Eurovision Song Contest 2021, placing fifth.

== Background ==
Prior to the 2020 Contest, Ukraine had participated in the Eurovision Song Contest fifteen times since its first entry in 2003, winning it in 2004 with the song "Wild Dances" performed by Ruslana and in 2016 with the song "1944" performed by Jamala. Following the introduction of semi-finals for the 2004, Ukraine had managed to qualify to final in every contest they participated in thus far. Ukraine had been the runner-up in the contest on two occasions: in 2007 with the song "Dancing Lasha Tumbai" performed by Verka Serduchka and in 2008 with the song "Shady Lady" performed by Ani Lorak. Ukraine's least successful result had been 24th place, which they achieved, as hosts, in 2017, with the song "Time" performed by O.Torvald.

The Ukrainian national broadcaster, Public Broadcasting Company of Ukraine (UA:PBC), broadcasts the event within Ukraine and organises the selection process for the nation's entry. Following a one-year absence due to their withdrawal in 2019 following contractual disagreements with their representative Maruv on conditions of taking part in the Ukrainian delegation, UA:PBC confirmed their intentions to participate at the 2020 Eurovision Song Contest on 20 September 2019. In the past, UA:PBC had alternated between both internal selections and national finals in order to select the Ukrainian entry. Since 2016, the broadcaster, in collaboration with commercial broadcaster STB, had set up national finals with several artists to choose both the song and performer to compete at Eurovision for Ukraine, with both the public and a panel of jury members involved in the selection. Suspilne's collaboration with STB would have continued until 2021.

== Before Eurovision ==
=== Vidbir 2020 ===
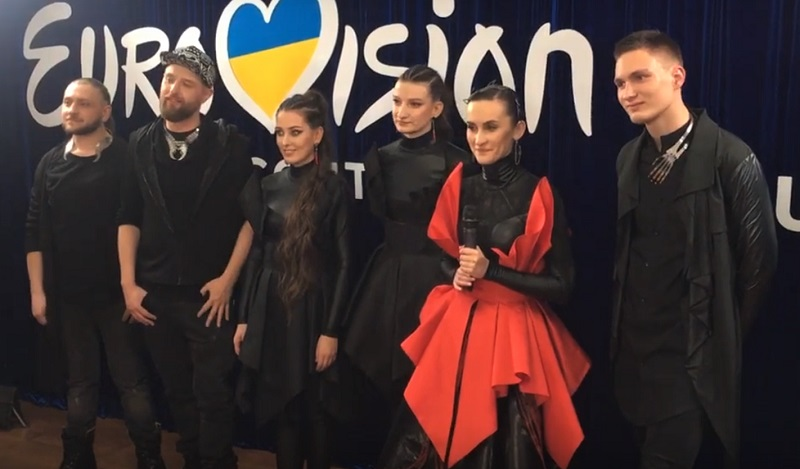
Go_A backstage during Vidbir 2020

Vidbir 2020 was the fifth edition of Vidbir which selected the Ukrainian entry for the Eurovision Song Contest 2020. The competition took place at the Palace of Culture "KPI" in Kyiv and consisted of two semi-finals held on 8 and 15 February 2020 and a final on 22 February 2020. All shows in the competition were hosted by Serhiy Prytula and broadcast on both UA:Pershyi and STB, and online via Suspilne's official Eurovision Song Contest website eurovision.ua as well as Suspilne and STB's Facebook and YouTube broadcasts. The final was also broadcast via radio on UA:Ukrainian Radio and Radio Promin.

==== Format ====
The selection of the competing entries for the national final and ultimately the Ukrainian Eurovision entry took place over three stages. In the first stage, artists and songwriters had the opportunity to apply for the competition through an online submission form. Sixteen acts were selected and announced on 20 January 2020. The second stage consisted of the televised semi-finals which took place on 8 and 15 February 2020 with eight acts competing in each show. Three acts were selected to advance from each semi-final based on the 50/50 combination of votes from a public televote and an expert jury. Both the public televote and the expert jury assigned scores ranging from 1 (lowest) to 8 (highest) and the three entries that had the highest number of points following the combination of these scores advanced to the final. The third stage was the final, which took place on 22 February 2020 and featured the six acts that qualified from the semi-finals vying to represent Ukraine in Rotterdam. The winner was selected via the 50/50 combination of votes from a public televote and an expert jury. Both the public televote and the expert jury assigned scores ranging from 1 (lowest) to 6 (highest) and the entry that had the highest number of points following the combination of these scores was declared the winner. Viewers participating in the public televote during the three live shows had the opportunity to submit a single vote per phone number for each of the participating entries via SMS or the Teleportal mobile application. In the event of a tie during the semi-finals and final, the tie was decided in favour of the entry that received the highest score from the public televote.

The jury panel that voted during the three shows consisted of:

- Andriy Danylko – comedian and singer, represented Ukraine in 2007 as the drag artist Verka Serduchka
- Tina Karol – singer, actress and television presenter, represented Ukraine in 2006
- Vitaliy Drozdov – general producer of TAVR Media Radio Holding
The Vidbir 2020 judges

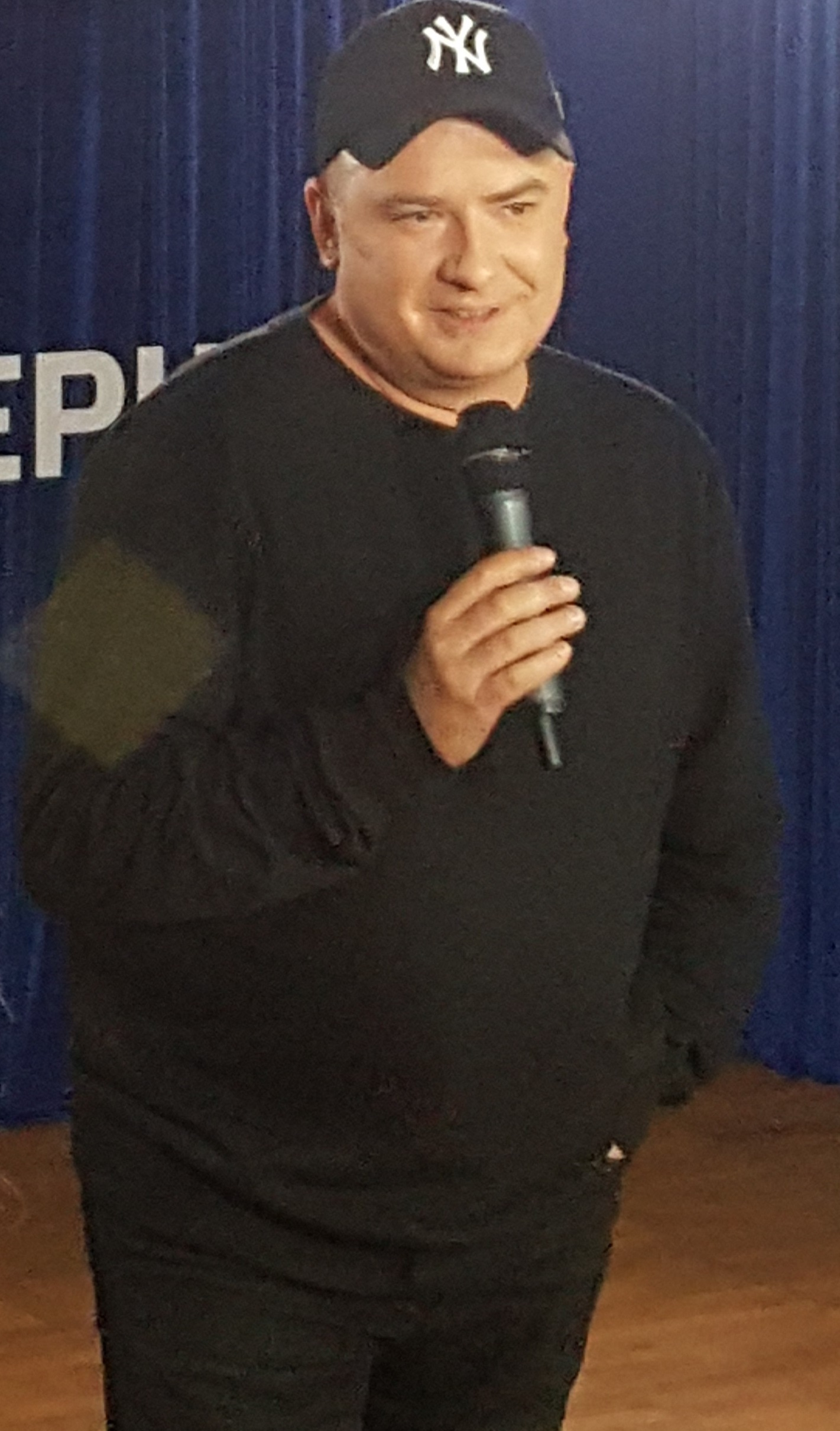
Andriy Danylko

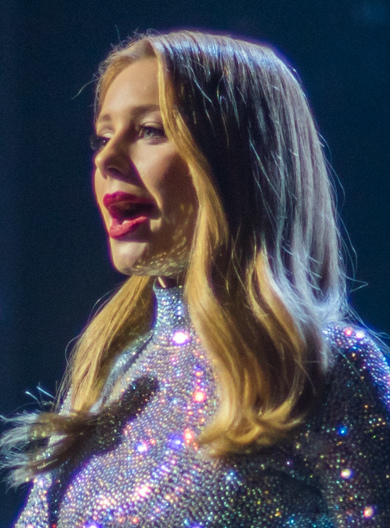
Tina Karol

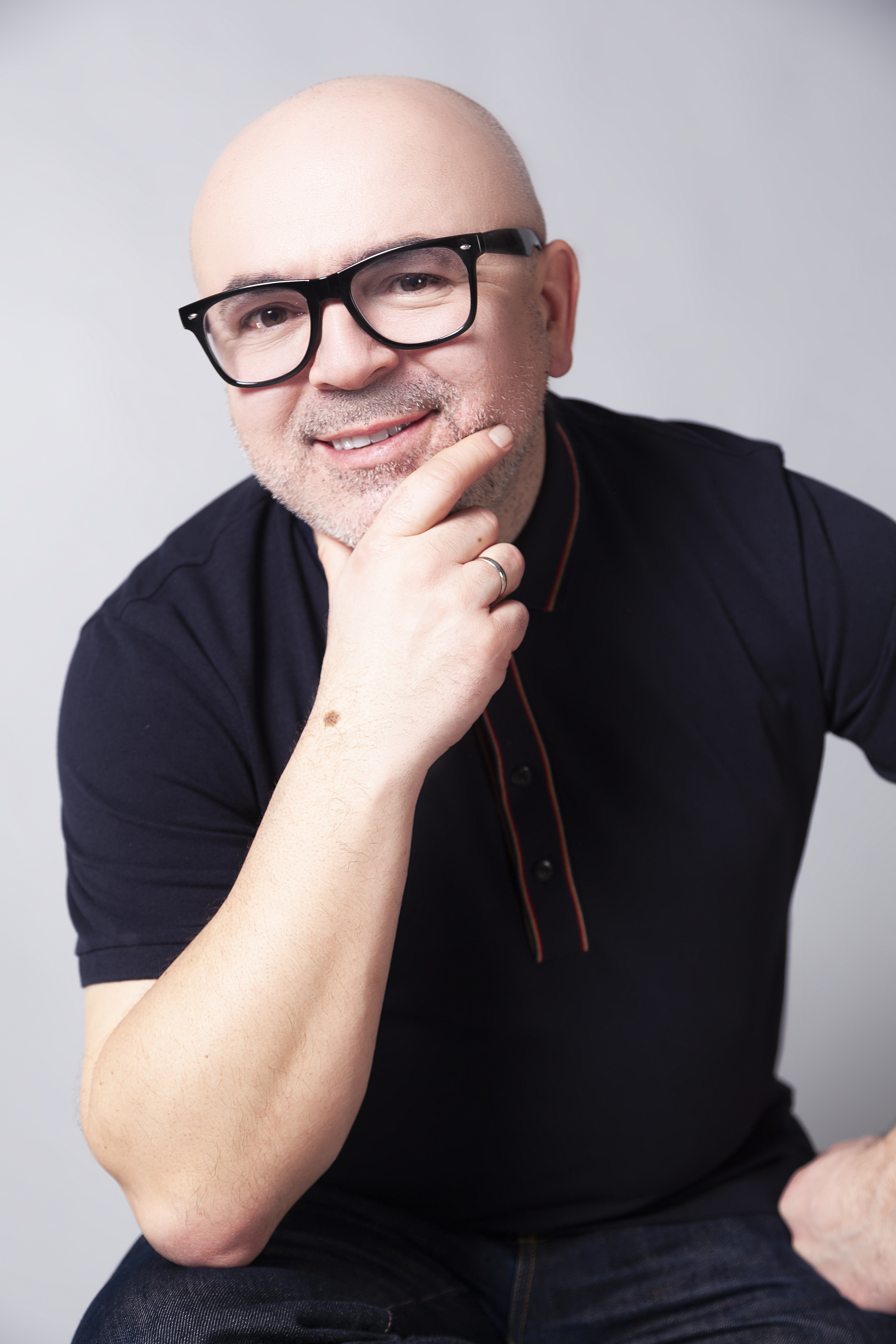
Vitaliy Drozdov

==== Competing entries ====
Artists and composers had the opportunity to submit their entries via an online submission form which accepted entries between 16 October 2019 and 25 December 2019. New rules from the 2020 edition only allowed for artists that had not performed in Russia since 2014 and entered the territory of Crimea without due permission to apply for the competition. Composer and producer Ruslan Kvinta was assigned as the music producer of the show and was the lead in reviewing the received submissions and shortlisting entries to compete in the national final. On 20 January 2020, the sixteen selected competing acts were announced. The sixteen acts were allocated to one of two semi-finals during a draw that took place on 22 January, which was hosted by Ruslan Kvinta.

Artist	Song	Songwriter(s)
Assol	"Save It"	Kateryna Taranenko, Maksym Zakharin, Anna Chernukha, Eldar Bayramov, Yan Likarenko
Cloudless	"Drown Me Down"	Yuriy Kanalosh, Anton Panfilov, Oleksandr Lysanskiy, Mykhailo Shatokhin
David Axelrod	"Horizon"	David Axelrod, Pavlo Shylko, Volodymyr Grigorovitch
Elina Ivashchenko	"Get Up"	Elina Ivashchenko, Vadim Lysitsa
Fo Sho	"Blck Sqr"	Betty Endale
Garna	"Who We Are"	Alyona Levasheva, Roman Nepomnyashiy
Gio Dara	"Feeling So Lost"	Giorgi Darakhvelidze
Go_A	"Solovey" (Соловей)	Taras Shevchenko, Kateryna Pavlenko
Jerry Heil	"Vegan"	Yana Shemaieva, Roman Cherenov
Katya Chilly	"Pich" (Піч)	Kateryna Kondratenko
Khayat	"Call for Love"	Andriy Khayat
Krutь	"99"	Mykhailo Klymenko, Anton Babych, Maryna Krut
Moonzoo and F.M.F Sure	"Maze"	Oleksandr Vasetskyi, F.M.F. Sure
[О]	"Tam, kudy ya ydu" (Там, куди я йду)	Olha Chernyshova, Alexander Kasprov
Oleksandr Poriadynskyi	"Savior"	Yana Kovaliova
Tvorchi	"Bonfire"	Andrii Hutsuliak, Augustus Kehinde Jimon

==== Semi-finals ====
The two semi-finals took place on 8 and 15 February 2020. In each semi-final eight acts competed and the top three entries determined following the combination of votes from a public televote and an expert jury advanced to the final of the competition, while the remaining five entries were eliminated. In addition to the performances of the competing entries, 2018 Ukrainian Eurovision entrant Mélovin performed the song "Oh, No!" as a guest in the first semi-final, while guests for the second semi-final included The Hardkiss, 2019 Junior Ukrainian Eurovision entrant Sophia Ivanko and 2020 Czech Eurovision entrant Benny Cristo performing the 2020 Czech entry "Kemama".

Semi-final 1 – 8 February 2020
R/O	Artist	Song	Jury	Televote		Total	Place
R/O	Artist	Song	Jury	Percentage	Points	Total	Place
1	[О]	"Tam, kudy ya ydu"	3	5.46%	2	5	7
2	Jerry Heil	"Vegan"	7	16.28%	6	13	3
3	Katya Chilly	"Pich"	4	8.44%	3	7	5
4	Krutь	"99"	8	22.69%	8	16	1
5	Go_A	"Solovey"	6	18.11%	7	13	2
6	Cloudless	"Drown Me Down"	5	14.75%	5	10	4
7	Gio Dara	"Feeling So Lost"	2	8.84%	4	6	6
8	Assol	"Save It"	1	5.43%	1	2	8

Semi-final 1 – Detailed Jury Votes
R/O	Song	A. Danylko	T. Karol	V. Drozdov	Total	Points
1	"Tam, kudy ya ydu"	3	3	3	9	3
2	"Vegan"	5	7	7	19	7
3	"Pich"	4	6	4	14	4
4	"99"	7	8	8	23	8
5	"Solovey"	8	5	5	18	6
6	"Drown Me Down"	6	2	6	14	5
7	"Feeling So Lost"	1	4	2	7	2
8	"Save It"	2	1	1	4	1

Semi-final 2 – 15 February 2020
R/O	Artist	Song	Jury	Televote		Total	Place
R/O	Artist	Song	Jury	Percentage	Points	Total	Place
1	Moonzoo and F.M.F Sure	"Maze"	5	9.46%	2	7	6
2	Fo Sho	"Blck Sqr"	3	10.77%	3	6	7
3	Elina Ivashchenko	"Get Up"	4	10.94%	4	8	5
4	Oleksandr Poriadynskyi	"Savior"	2	11.72%	6	8	4
5	Garna	"Who We Are"	1	5.65%	1	2	8
6	Khayat	"Call for Love"	7	17.87%	7	14	2
7	David Axelrod	"Horizon"	6	11.56%	5	11	3
8	Tvorchi	"Bonfire"	8	22.03%	8	16	1

Semi-final 2 – Detailed Jury Votes
R/O	Song	A. Danylko	T. Karol	V. Drozdov	Total	Points
1	"Maze"	7	2	7	16	5
2	"Blck Sqr"	2	4	3	9	3
3	"Get Up"	3	7	4	14	4
4	"Savior"	4	3	2	9	2
5	"Who We Are?"	1	1	1	3	1
6	"Call for Love"	6	8	5	19	7
7	"Horizon"	5	6	6	17	6
8	"Bonfire"	8	5	8	21	8

==== Final ====
The final took place on 22 February 2020. The six entries that qualified from the semi-finals competed. The winner, "Solovey" performed by Go_A, was selected through the combination of votes from a public televote and an expert jury. Ties were decided in favour of the entries that received higher scores from the public televote. "Solovey" became the first Ukrainian entry in the Eurovision Song Contest to be performed entirely in the Ukrainian language. In addition to the performances of the competing entries, guests included performances from jury members Tina Karol and Verka Serduchka as well as Ukrainian Eurovision Song Contest 2016 winner Jamala performing the song "Zhali" together with alyona alyona.

Final – 22 February 2020
R/O	Artist	Song	Jury	Televote		Total	Place
R/O	Artist	Song	Jury	Percentage	Points	Total	Place
1	Krutь	"99"	5	19.90%	4	9	3
2	Jerry Heil	"Vegan"	1	7.00%	1	2	6
3	Go_A	"Solovey"	6	25.43%	6	12	1
4	David Axelrod	"Horizon"	3	11.30%	2	5	5
5	Khayat	"Call for Love"	4	20.93%	5	9	2
6	Tvorchi	"Bonfire"	2	15.44%	3	5	4

Detailed Jury Votes
R/O	Song	A. Danylko	T. Karol	V. Drozdov	Total	Points
1	"99"	5	4	5	14	5
2	"Vegan"	1	1	1	3	1
3	"Solovey"	6	6	6	18	6
4	"Horizon"	3	3	3	9	3
5	"Call for Love"	4	5	4	13	4
6	"Bonfire"	2	2	2	6	2

== At Eurovision ==
The Eurovision Song Contest 2020 was originally scheduled to take place at Rotterdam Ahoy in Rotterdam, Netherlands and consist of two semi-finals on 12 and 14 May, and a final on 16 May 2020. According to Eurovision rules, each country, except the host nation and the "Big Five" (France, Germany, Italy, Spain and the United Kingdom), would have been required to qualify from one of two semi-finals to compete for the final; the top ten countries from each semi-final would have progressed to the final. On 28 January 2020, the allocation draw was held at Rotterdam City Hall, placing Ukraine into the second half of the second semi-final. However, due to the COVID-19 pandemic in Europe, the contest was cancelled on 18 March 2020. The EBU announced soon after that entries intended for 2020 would not be eligible for the following year, though each broadcaster would be able to send either their 2020 representative or a new one. During a replacement show Eurovision Song Celebration 2020 broadcast on YouTube in place of the semi-finals, it was revealed that Ukraine would have performed last at the contest, in position 17 following the entry from Romania.

=== Alternative song contests ===
Some of the broadcasters scheduled to take part in the Eurovision Song Contest 2020 organised alternative competitions. Austria's ORF broadcast Der kleine Song Contest in April 2020, which saw every entry being assigned to one of three semi-finals. A jury consisting of ten singers that had represented Austria at Eurovision before was hired to rank each song; the best-placed entry in each semi-final advanced to the final round. In the third semi-final on 18 April, Ukraine placed 10th in a field of 13 participants, achieving 45 points. Ukraine's song also partook in Sveriges Television's Sveriges 12:a in May, though it did not qualify for the competition's final.
