= Ukraine in the Eurovision Song Contest 2016 =

- Eurovision Song Contest 2016
- Participating broadcaster: National Television Company of Ukraine (NTU)
- Country: Ukraine
- Selection process: Vidbir 2016
- Selection date: 21 February 2016

Competing entry
- Song: "1944"
- Artist: Jamala
- Songwriters: Jamala

Placement
- Semi-final result: Qualified (2nd, 287 points)
- Final result: 1st, 534 points

Participation chronology

Ukraine was represented at the Eurovision Song Contest 2016 with the song "1944", written and performed by Jamala. The Ukrainian participating broadcaster, the National Television Company of Ukraine (NTU), organised a national final in order to select its entry for the contest in collaboration with commercial broadcaster STB. NTU returned to the contest after withdrawing from the 2015 competition due to financial and political reasons related to the Russo-Ukrainian War.

The national selection consisted of two semi-finals, held on 6 and 13 February 2016, and a final, held on 21 February 2016; nine entries competed in each semi-final with the top three from each semi-final advancing to the final. In the final, "1944" performed by Jamala was selected as the winner after tying for first place following the combination of votes from a three-member jury panel and a public televote—the tie was decided in Jamala's favour after "1944" scored the highest with the public. "1944" is the first Eurovision Song Contest song to feature lyrics in the Crimean Tatar language. The Ukrainian entry caused controversy and garnered international media interest both for Jamala, a Ukrainian singer of Crimean Tatar descent, and the song "1944", which was inspired by the story of her great-grandmother during the 1944 deportation of the Crimean Tatars in the Soviet Union under the rule of Joseph Stalin. Despite media reports that the song could be disqualified due to its alleged political overtones, the Eurovision Song Contest Reference Group cleared the song for the competition and stated that neither the title nor the lyrics of the song contained political speech.

Ukraine was drawn to compete in the second semi-final of the Eurovision Song Contest which took place on 12 May 2016. Performing during the show in position 14, "1944" was announced among the top 10 entries of the second semi-final and therefore qualified to compete in the final on 14 May. It was later revealed that Ukraine placed second out of the 18 participating countries in the semi-final with 287 points. In the final, Ukraine performed in position 21 and placed first out of the 26 participating countries, winning the contest with 534 points. This was Ukraine's second win in the Eurovision Song Contest; their first victory was in 2004.

== Background ==
Prior to the 2016 contest, the National Television Company of Ukraine (NTU) had participated in the Eurovision Song Contest representing Ukraine twelve times since its first entry in 2003, winning the contest in 2004 with the song "Wild Dances" performed by Ruslana. Following the introduction of semi-finals for the 2004 contest, it had managed to qualify to final in every contest they participated in thus far. Ukraine had been the runner-up in the contest on two occasions: in 2007 with the song "Dancing Lasha Tumbai" performed by Verka Serduchka and in 2008 with the song "Shady Lady" performed by Ani Lorak. Its least successful result had been 19th place, achieved in 2005, with the song "Razom nas bahato" performed by GreenJolly.

As part of its duties as participating broadcaster, NTU organises the selection of its entry in the Eurovision Song Contest and broadcasts the event in the country. The broadcaster confirmed its intentions to participate at the 2016 contest on 16 September 2015. In the past, NTU had alternated between both internal selections and national finals in order to select its entry. Between 2011 and 2014, the broadcaster had set up national finals with several artists to choose both the song and performer, with both the public and a panel of jury members involved in the selection. In September 2014, NTU announced that it would not participate in the 2015 contest because of the unstable financial and political situation caused by the conflict in east Ukraine. Along with the announcement of their withdrawal, NTU revealed that it had discussed the matter with the European Broadcasting Union (EBU), and that its absence would be limited to one year only with an expected return in 2016. On 18 November 2015, it was announced that NTU would collaborate with commercial broadcaster STB in order to organise a national final to select its 2016 entry. General director of NTU Zurab Alasania praised the collaboration between the two broadcasters stating that they would do everything possible for the Ukrainian entry to represent the country successfully. Likewise, CEO of STB Vladimir Borodyansky stated that together the broadcasters would create "a national movement" by organising a selection that would involve the best producers, directors, and choreographers.

== Before Eurovision ==
=== Vidbir 2016 ===
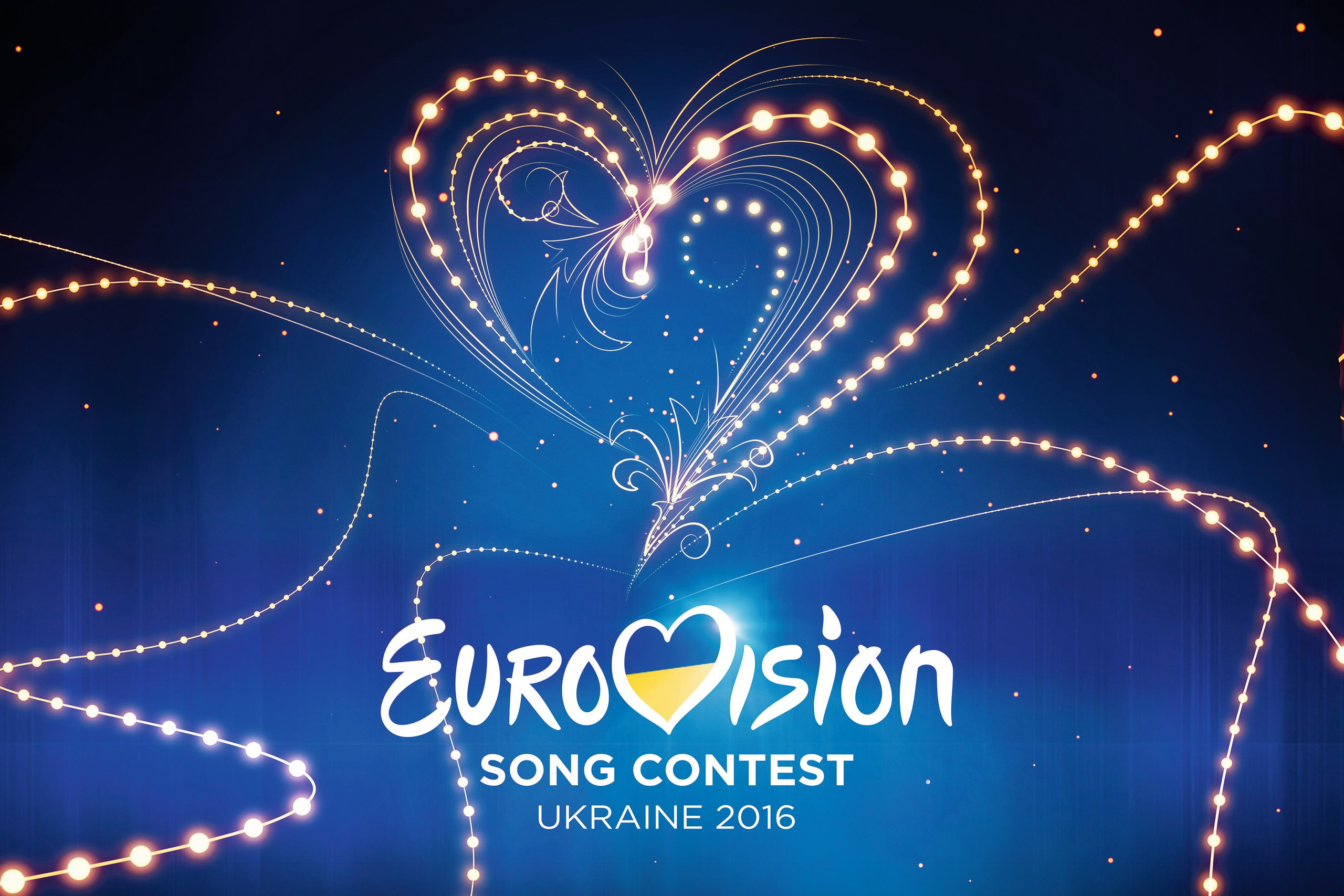
The logo of Vidbir 2016

Vidbir 2016 was the first edition of Vidbir which selected the Ukrainian entry for the Eurovision Song Contest 2016. The competition took place at the STB Studios in Hostomel, Kyiv Oblast and consisted of two semi-finals held on 6 and 13 February 2016 and a final on 21 February 2016. All shows in the competition were hosted by Dmytro Tankovich and Oleksandr Pedan and broadcast on both UA:Pershyi and STB as well as online via NTU's YouTube broadcasts.

==== Format ====
The selection of the competing entries for the national final and ultimately the Ukrainian Eurovision entry took place over three stages. In the first stage, artists and songwriters had the opportunity to apply for the competition either through an online submission form or by attending a scheduled audition during designated dates. Eighteen acts were selected and announced on 26 January 2016. The second stage consisted of the televised semi-finals which took place on 6 and 13 February 2016 with nine acts competing in each show. Three acts were selected to advance from each semi-final based on the 50/50 combination of votes from a public televote and an expert jury. Both the public televote and the expert jury assigned scores ranging from 1 (lowest) to 9 (highest) and the three entries that had the highest number of points following the combination of these scores advanced to the final. The third stage was the final, which took place on 21 February 2016 and featured the six acts that qualified from the semi-finals vying to represent Ukraine in Stockholm. The winner was selected via the 50/50 combination of votes from a public televote and an expert jury. Both the public televote and the expert jury assigned scores ranging from 1 (lowest) to 6 (highest) and the entry that had the highest number of points following the combination of these scores was declared the winner. Viewers participating in the public televote during the three live shows had the opportunity to submit a single vote per phone number for each of the participating entries via SMS. In the event of a tie during the semi-finals and final, the tie was decided in favour of the entry that received the highest score from the public televote.

The jury panel that voted during the three shows consisted of:

- Konstantin Meladze – Composer and producer
- Ruslana – singer-songwriter, winner of Eurovision for Ukraine in 2004
- Andriy Danylko – comedian and singer, represented Ukraine in 2007 as the drag artist Verka Serduchka

Crimean Tatar leaders pledged to enable people in Crimea to vote in the national selection; according to Crimean Tatar public figure Refat Chubarov: "If Crimeans are not able to vote in such Ukrainian competitions, we are silently agreeing with those who say Crimea is not part of Ukraine." In 2014 Crimea was unilaterally annexed by Russia.

==== Competing entries ====
Artists and composers had the opportunity to submit their entries via an online submission form which accepted entries between 19 November 2015 and 20 January 2016. In addition, interested performers could also attend auditions that were held between 5 and 20 December 2015 in the following cities and locations:

- 5–6 December 2015: Zaporizhia (Hotel "Inturist") and Kharkiv (Hotel "Kharkiv")
- 12–13 December 2015: Odesa (Hotel "OK") and Lviv (Hotel "Dnister")
- 19–20 December 2015: Dnipropetrovsk ("Parle" Conference Centre) and Kyiv (STB Headquarters)

Composer and producer Konstantin Meladze was assigned as the music producer of the show and was the lead in reviewing the received submissions and shortlisting entries to compete in the national final. On 26 January 2016, the eighteen selected competing acts were announced. The eighteen acts were allocated to one of two semi-finals during a draw that took place on 27 January, which was hosted by Ruslana. Among the competing artists was Anastasia Prikhodko, who represented Russia in 2009 with the song "Mamo". Viktoria Petryk represented Ukraine in Junior Eurovision 2008.

Artist	Song	Songwriter(s)
Aida Nikolaychuk	"Inner Power"	Alena Melnik, Evheniy Matyushenko
Alloise	"Crown"	Alloise, Alexey Casual Man
Anastasia Prikhodko	"I Am Free Now"	Shushan Sargsyan, Mykola Brovchenko
Arkadiy Voytyuk	"Vse v tobi" (Все в тобі)	Arkadiy Voytyuk
Brunettes Shoot Blondes	"Every Monday"	Andrey Kovalev
Jamala	"1944"	Jamala
Japanda	"Anime"	Alisa Kosmos
Lavika	"Hold Me"	Ivan Danchenko, Lavika, Freddy Newton
NuAngels	"Higher"	Alexander Bard, Andreas Öhrn, Chris Wahle
Peaks of Kings	"Last Hope"	Valentine Peak
Pringlez	"Easy to Love"	Anna Korsun
Pur:Pur	"We Do Change"	Nata Smirina, Evgeniy Zhebko
Sunsay	"Love Manifest"	Andrey Zaporozhets, Yevgeny Filatov
Svitlana Tarabarova	"Never Again"	Svitlana Tarabarova
The Hardkiss	"Helpless"	Yulia Sanina, Valeriy "Val" Bebko
Tonya Matvienko	"Tin Whistle"	Antonina Matviyenko, Maria Gedroits
Viktoria Petryk	"Overload"	Ylva Persson, Linda Persson, Niclas Haglund, William Taylor
Vladislav Kurasov	"I'm Insane"	Vladislav Kurasov, Natalia Rostova

==== Shows ====
===== Semi-finals =====
Two semi-finals took place on 6 and 13 February 2016. In each semi-final nine acts competed and the top three entries determined following the combination of votes from a public televote and an expert jury advanced to the final of the competition, while the remaining six entries were eliminated. In addition to the performances of the competing entries, Ivan, who would represent Belarus in 2016, performed his entry "Help You Fly", and Barei, who would represent Spain in 2016, performed her entry "Say Yay!", as guests in the first and second semi-finals respectively.

Semi-final 1 – 6 February 2016
R/O	Artist	Song	Jury	Televote		Total	Place
R/O	Artist	Song	Jury	Percentage	Points	Total	Place
1	Anastasia Prikhodko	"I Am Free Now"	4	2.89%	3	7	7
2	The Hardkiss	"Helpless"	7	16.03%	8	15	2
3	Tonya Matvienko	"Tin Whistle"	5	2.83%	2	7	8
4	Vladislav Kurasov	"I'm Insane"	3	3.91%	4	7	6
5	Lavika	"Hold Me"	1	0.73%	1	2	9
6	Jamala	"1944"	9	49.22%	9	18	1
7	Aida Nikolaychuk	"Inner Power"	2	10.41%	7	9	5
8	Svitlana Tarabarova	"Never Again"	6	7.24%	6	12	4
9	Brunettes Shoot Blondes	"Every Monday"	8	6.74%	5	13	3

Semi-final 2 – 13 February 2016
R/O	Artist	Song	Jury	Televote		Total	Place
R/O	Artist	Song	Jury	Percentage	Points	Total	Place
1	Arkadiy Voytyuk	"Vse v tobi"	4	5.34%	6	10	4
2	Alloise	"Crown"	6	1.95%	2	8	6
3	Japanda	"Anime"	1	1.47%	1	2	9
4	NuAngels	"Higher"	7	14.69%	8	15	2
5	Pur:Pur	"We Do Change"	8	10.19%	7	15	3
6	Peaks of Kings	"Last Hope"	3	3.38%	3	6	8
7	Viktoria Petryk	"Overload"	2	4.64%	4	6	7
8	Pringlez	"Easy to Love"	5	5.30%	5	10	5
9	Sunsay	"Love Manifest"	9	53.03%	9	18	1

===== Final =====
The final took place on 21 February 2016. The six entries that qualified from the semi-finals competed. The winner, "1944" performed by Jamala, was selected through the combination of votes from a public televote and an expert jury. Ties were decided in favour of the entries that received higher scores from the public televote. "1944" is the first Eurovision Song Contest song to feature lyrics in the Crimean Tatar language. 382,602 votes were registered by the televote during the show. In addition to the performances of the competing entries, Nicky Byrne, who would represent Ireland in 2016, performed his entry "Sunlight" as a guest. The Hardkiss and Jamala were tied at 11 points each but since Jamala received the most votes from the public she was declared the winner.

Final – 21 February 2016
R/O	Artist	Song	Jury	Televote		Total	Place
R/O	Artist	Song	Jury	Votes	Points	Total	Place
1	Brunettes Shoot Blondes	"Every Monday"	1	13,008	1	2	6
2	NuAngels	"Higher"	3	22,727	2	5	5
3	The Hardkiss	"Helpless"	6	80,767	5	11	2
4	Jamala	"1944"	5	144,509	6	11	1
5	Sunsay	"Love Manifest"	4	69,634	4	8	3
6	Pur:Pur	"We Do Change"	2	51,957	3	5	4

=== Lyrical subject matter controversy ===
The 2016 Ukrainian entry garnered international media exposure both for Jamala, a Ukrainian singer of Crimean Tatar descent, and the song "1944", which was inspired by the story of her great-grandmother during the 1944 deportation of the Crimean Tatars in the Soviet Union under the rule of Joseph Stalin. Jamala stated that one of the reasons for entering the Ukrainian national selection and participating in the Eurovision Song Contest was so that people would hear a song written "in a state of helplessness", drawing comparison between the 1944 deportation of Crimean Tatars and the annexation of Crimea by the Russian Federation in 2014. International media reported that although the song lyrics do not directly reference the Crimean deportation event in 1944, the entry could violate the Eurovision Song Contest rules which state that "no lyrics, speeches, gestures of political or similar nature shall be permitted". Representatives of the Russian parliament's lower house, State Duma, called for the EBU to reject the Ukrainian entry on the grounds that its selection was intended to offend Russia. Crimea's deputy prime minister, Ruslan Baalbek, stated that the Ukrainian authorities used the song for political purposes with the aim of "capitalising on the tragedy of the Tatars to impose on European viewers a false picture of alleged harassment of the Tatars in the Russian Crimea." In contrast, Mustafa Dzhemilev, a prominent Crimean Tatar politician in Ukraine, commended the selection of the song and stated: "I am confident that Jamala will present with dignity our country at the Eurovision. I believe that the whole world will know about 1944".

During a press conference for the Ukrainian Independent Information Agency on 26 February, Jamala stated that "1944" has no political overtones and that she could not be held responsible for the interpretations others make from the lyrics. Jamala also stated that she would change the lyrics if required to do so by the EBU. In an interview for Euronews published on 3 March, Jamala stated that there is no political statement being made in the song and that the purpose of the song was to commemorate her great-grandmother and the thousands of Crimean Tatars.

On 9 March, the EBU announced that the Eurovision Song Contest Reference Group concluded that "1944" was eligible for the contest as neither the title nor the lyrics of the song contained political speech.

=== Preparation ===
As part of NTU's collaboration with the commercial broadcaster STB, all costs related to the preparations surrounding the Ukrainian entry, including travel and accommodation in Stockholm, were covered by STB. In early March, Jamala began rehearsals for her Eurovision performance together with stage director and choreographer Konstantin Tomilchenko. Jamala announced that her performance would feature 3D mapping graphics developed by Front Pictures. In early April, Jamala collaborated with Vogue Ukraine in a special project which involved the presentation of nine stage costume designs by different designers. On 12 April, Jamala and the Vogue team ultimately selected the costume designed by Ivan Frolov. Jamala's outfit for the contest was ultimately determined during the rehearsals in Stockholm where the costume by Frolov and an additional two options designed by STB chief stylist Dmitry Kuryata were considered.

=== Promotion ===
Following Jamala's victory at the Ukrainian national final, the singer stated that an extensive promotional tour would not be necessary as the internet solves many problems by allowing access to information and performances. Jamala's PR manager, Denis Kozlovskiy, noted that the international media interest the song received had already completed a large part of the promotional campaign. Jamala announced that she would focus her promotional efforts in Ukraine where she would begin a concert tour which featured several dates scheduled in March and April prior to the Eurovision Song Contest. On 23 April, Jamala performed "1944" during the STB programme Ukrayina maye talant Diti.

In addition to her appearances within Ukraine, Jamala also promoted "1944" on 9 April during a performance at the Eurovision in Concert event which was held at the Melkweg venue in Amsterdam, Netherlands and hosted by Cornald Maas and Hera Björk.

== At Eurovision ==
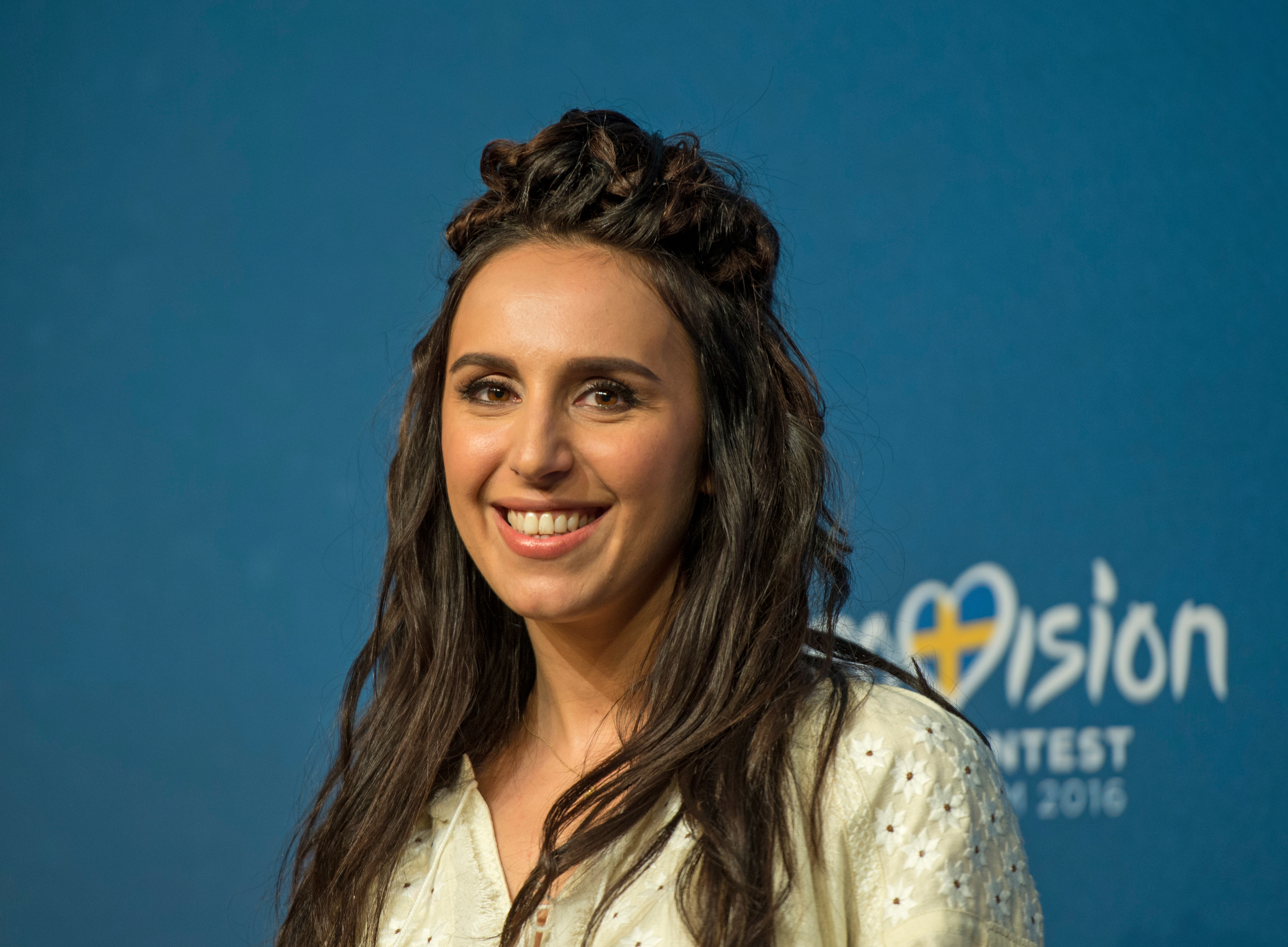
Jamala during a press meet and greet

According to Eurovision rules, all nations with the exceptions of the host country (Sweden) and the "Big Five" (France, Germany, Italy, Spain, and the United Kingdom) are required to qualify from one of two semi-finals in order to compete for the final; the top ten countries from each semi-final progress to the final. The European Broadcasting Union (EBU) split up the competing countries into six different pots based on voting patterns from previous contests, with countries with favourable voting histories put into the same pot. On 25 January 2016, a special allocation draw was held which placed each country into one of the two semi-finals, as well as which half of the show they would perform in. Ukraine was placed into the second semi-final, to be held on 12 May 2016, and was scheduled to perform in the second half of the show.

Once all the competing songs for the 2016 contest had been released, the running order for the semi-finals was decided by the shows' producers rather than through another draw, so that similar songs were not placed next to each other. Originally, Ukraine was set to perform in position 15, following the entry from Denmark and before the entry from Norway. However, following Romania's disqualification from the contest on 22 April and subsequent removal from the running order of the second semi-final, Ukraine's performing position shifted to 14.

In Ukraine, both the semi-finals and the final were broadcast on UA:Pershyi with commentary by Timur Miroshnychenko and Tetiana Terekhova. The three shows were also broadcast via radio on Radio Ukraine with commentary by Olena Zelinchenko. NTU appointed Verka Serduchka, who represented Ukraine in 2007, as its spokesperson to announce the top 12-point score awarded by the Ukrainian jury during the final.

=== Semi-final ===
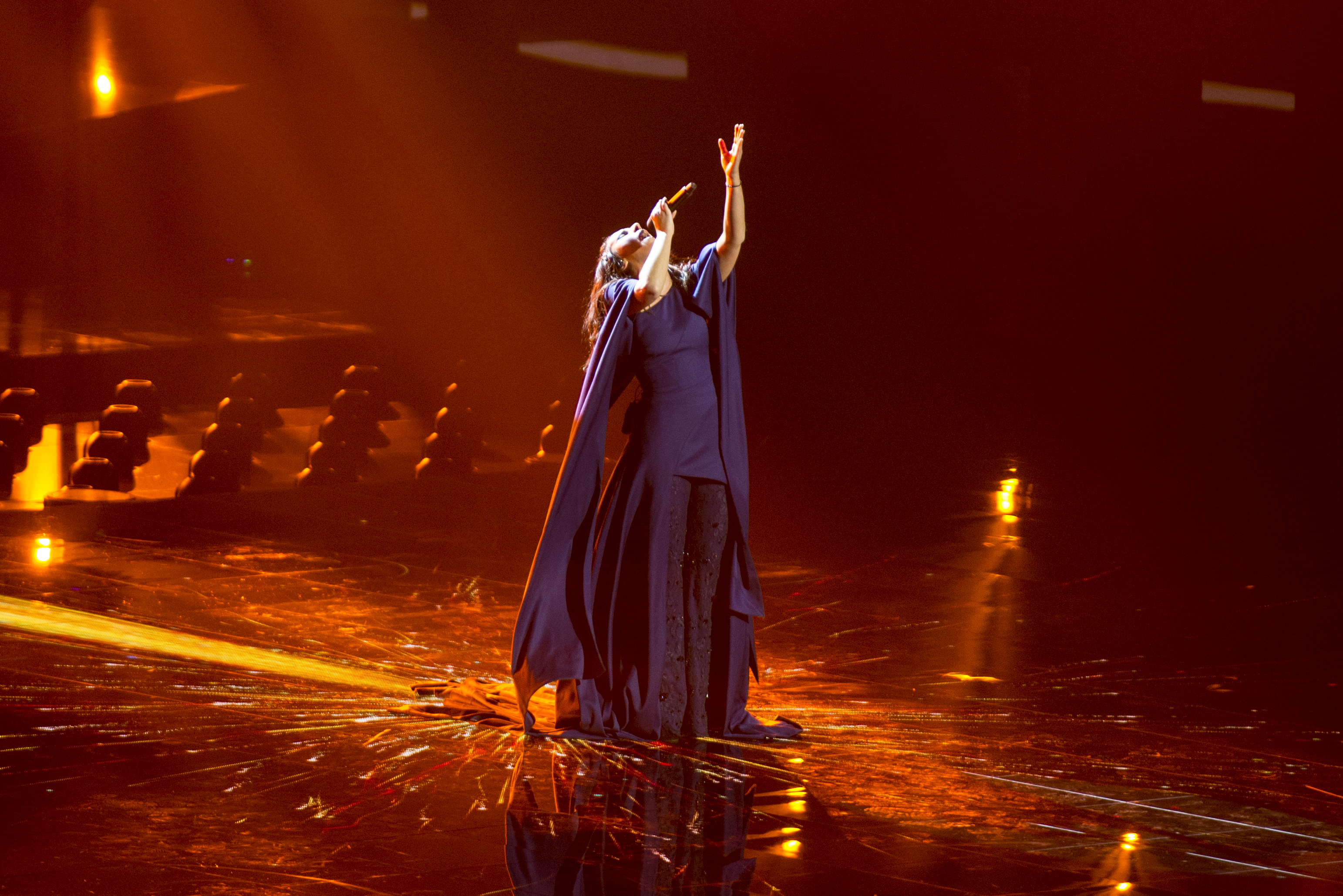
Jamala during a rehearsal before the second semi-final

Jamala took part in technical rehearsals on 5 and 7 May, followed by dress rehearsals on 11 and 12 May. This included the jury show on 11 May where the professional juries of each country watched and voted on the competing entries.

The Ukrainian performance featured Jamala performing on stage in a blue costume designed by Ivan Frolov together with two backing vocalists. The performance focused on Jamala as the predominately dark stage displayed yellow, red and orange colours and patterns with a large colourful tree appearing on the LED screens during the final chorus. The stage director and choreographer for the Ukrainian performance was Konstantin Tomilchenko. The two backing vocalists that joined Jamala on stage were Alina Kosenko and Aleksandra Makarovskaya.

At the end of the show, Ukraine was announced as having finished in the top 10 and subsequently qualifying for the grand final. It was later revealed that Ukraine placed second in the semi-final, receiving a total of 287 points: 152 points from the televoting and 135 points from the juries.

=== Final ===
Shortly after the second semi-final, a winners' press conference was held for the ten qualifying countries. As part of this press conference, the qualifying artists took part in a draw to determine which half of the grand final they would subsequently participate in. This draw was done in the reverse order the countries appeared in the semi-final running order. Ukraine was drawn to compete in the second half. Following this draw, the shows' producers decided upon the running order of the final, as they had done for the semi-finals. Ukraine was subsequently placed to perform in position 21, following the entry from Latvia and before the entry from Malta.

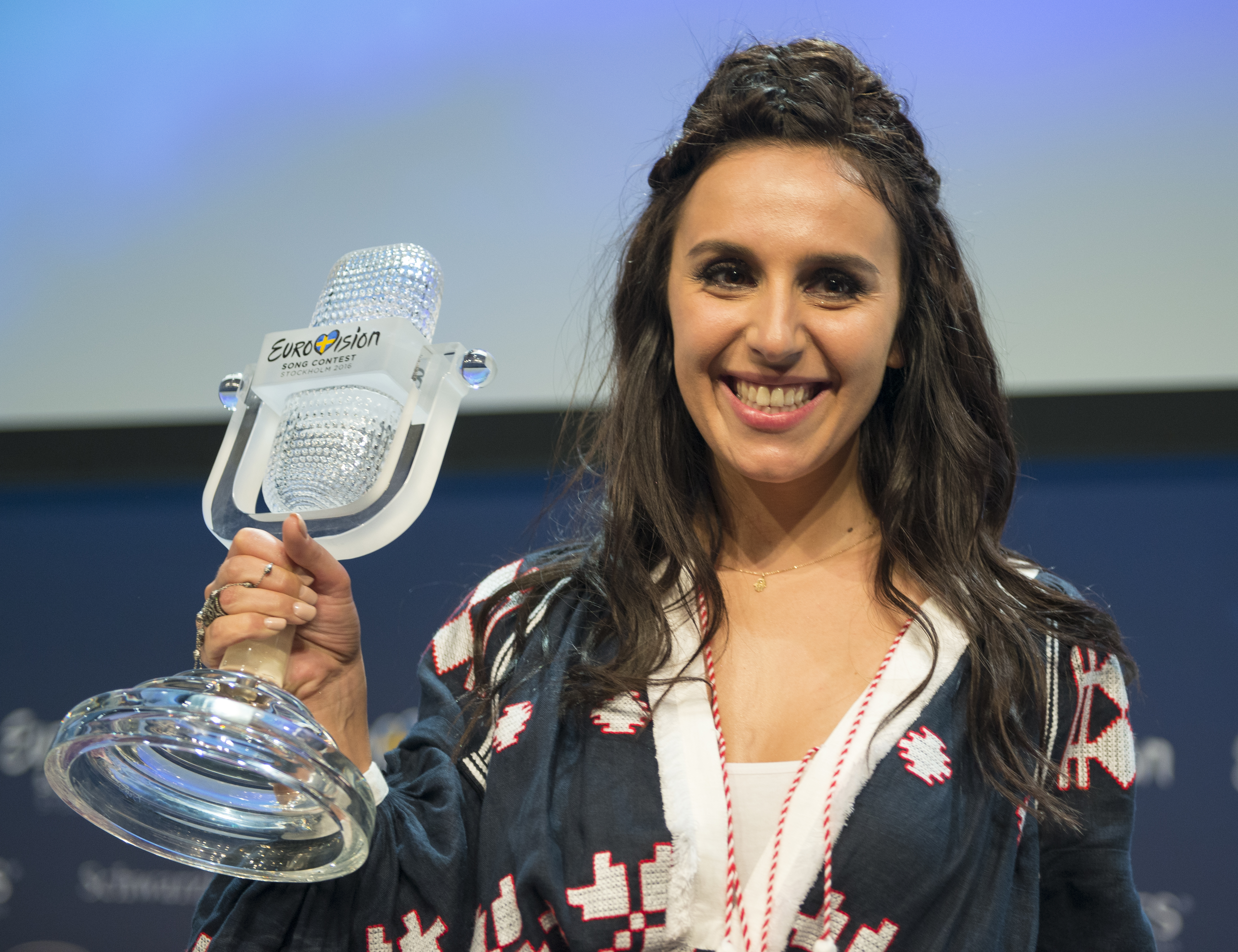
Jamala during the winner's press conference

Jamala once again took part in dress rehearsals on 13 and 14 May before the final, including the jury final where the professional juries cast their final votes before the live show. Jamala performed a repeat of her semi-final performance during the final on 14 May. Ukraine won the contest placing first with a score of 534 points: 323 points from the televoting and 211 points from the juries. This was Ukraine's second victory in the Eurovision Song Contest; their first victory was in 2004.

==== Marcel Bezençon Awards ====
The Marcel Bezençon Awards, first awarded during the 2002 contest, are awards honouring the best competing songs in the final each year. Named after the creator of the annual contest, Marcel Bezençon, the awards are divided into 3 categories: the Press Award, given to the best entry as voted on by the accredited media and press during the event; the Artistic Award, presented to the best artist as voted on by the shows' commentators; and the Composer Award, given to the best and most original composition as voted by the participating composers. Jamala was awarded the Artistic Award, which was accepted at the awards ceremony by Jamala.

=== Voting ===
Voting during the three shows was conducted under a new system that involved each country now awarding two sets of points from 1-8, 10 and 12: one from their professional jury and the other from televoting. Each nation's jury consisted of five music industry professionals who are citizens of the country they represent, with their names published before the contest to ensure transparency. This jury judged each entry based on: vocal capacity; the stage performance; the song's composition and originality; and the overall impression by the act. In addition, no member of a national jury was permitted to be related in any way to any of the competing acts in such a way that they cannot vote impartially and independently. The individual rankings of each jury member as well as the nation's televoting results were released shortly after the grand final.

Below is a breakdown of points awarded to Ukraine and awarded by Ukraine in the second semi-final and grand final of the contest, and the breakdown of the jury voting and televoting conducted during the two shows:

==== Points awarded to Ukraine ====
Points awarded to Ukraine (Semi-final 2)
Score	Televote	Jury
12 points	Belarus; Bulgaria; Georgia; Italy; Latvia; Poland	Georgia; Poland
10 points	Lithuania	Israel; Italy; Latvia; Macedonia; Serbia
8 points	Germany; Slovenia	Lithuania; Slovenia
7 points	Israel	Belarus
6 points	Belgium; Macedonia; Serbia	Germany; Norway; United Kingdom
5 points	Albania; Denmark; Switzerland	Albania; Belgium; Switzerland
4 points	Ireland; Norway	Bulgaria
3 points	Australia; United Kingdom	
2 points		
1 point		Denmark

Points awarded to Ukraine (Final)
Score	Televote	Jury
12 points	Czech Republic; Finland; Hungary; Italy; Poland; San Marino	Bosnia and Herzegovina; Denmark; Georgia; Israel; Latvia; Macedonia; Moldova; Poland; San Marino; Serbia; Slovenia
10 points	Armenia; Austria; Azerbaijan; Belarus; Bulgaria; Croatia; France; Georgia; Latvia; Lithuania; Moldova; Russia	Azerbaijan; Italy; United Kingdom
8 points	Australia; Estonia; Israel; Montenegro	Lithuania
7 points	Bosnia and Herzegovina; Cyprus; Netherlands; Serbia; Slovenia; Spain; Sweden	Belarus; Estonia; Germany
6 points	Albania; Germany; Greece; Macedonia	Switzerland
5 points	United Kingdom	
4 points	Ireland; Malta; Norway; Switzerland	Norway
3 points	Denmark	Belgium; Netherlands
2 points	Belgium	Australia; Greece
1 point		

==== Points awarded by Ukraine ====
Points awarded by Ukraine (Semi-final 2)
Score	Televote	Jury
12 points	Poland	Australia
10 points	Belarus	Belgium
8 points	Georgia	Lithuania
7 points	Australia	Israel
6 points	Lithuania	Latvia
5 points	Bulgaria	Belarus
4 points	Belgium	Georgia
3 points	Latvia	Serbia
2 points	Israel	Ireland
1 point	Norway	Poland

Points awarded by Ukraine (Final)
Score	Televote	Jury
12 points	Russia	Lithuania
10 points	Azerbaijan	Belgium
8 points	Poland	Latvia
7 points	Armenia	Azerbaijan
6 points	Georgia	Israel
5 points	Latvia	Australia
4 points	Australia	Sweden
3 points	Lithuania	Georgia
2 points	Bulgaria	Hungary
1 point	Sweden	Bulgaria

==== Detailed voting results ====
The following members comprised the Ukrainian jury:

- Oleksandr Ksenofontov (jury chairperson) – producer, lyricist, lyricist of "Wild Dances" the song that won Eurovision for Ukraine in 2004
- Maria Burmaka – singer, Merited Artist of Ukraine, candidate of philological sciences
- Valentyn Koval – M1/M2 general manager
- Valeria Chachibaya – director of Radio "Aristocrats" PLC
- Andriy Yakymenko (Andre France) – singer, composer, songwriter, producer

Detailed voting results from Ukraine (Semi-final 2)
R/O	Country	Jury							Televote	
R/O	Country	O. Ksenofontov	M. Burmaka	V. Koval	V. Chachibaya	A. France	Rank	Points	Rank	Points
01	Latvia	8	3	7	6	4	5	6	8	3
02	Poland	10	12	12	8	11	10	1	1	12
03	Switzerland	13	11	16	7	13	14		16	
04	Israel	5	6	5	4	2	4	7	9	2
05	Belarus	9	7	4	9	10	6	5	2	10
06	Serbia	6	5	11	11	15	8	3	14	
07	Ireland	7	10	6	16	9	9	2	13	
08	Macedonia	17	17	17	17	16	17		15	
09	Lithuania	2	4	3	5	5	3	8	5	6
10	Australia	1	2	2	3	1	1	12	4	7
11	Slovenia	11	9	13	14	12	13		12	
12	Bulgaria	12	8	15	15	6	11		6	5
13	Denmark	16	14	10	10	14	15		11	
14	Ukraine									
15	Norway	15	13	9	13	8	12		10	1
16	Georgia	3	16	14	1	7	7	4	3	8
17	Albania	14	15	8	12	17	16		17	
18	Belgium	4	1	1	2	3	2	10	7	4

Detailed voting results from Ukraine (Final)
R/O	Country	Jury							Televote	
R/O	Country	O. Ksenofontov	M. Burmaka	V. Koval	V. Chachibaya	A. France	Rank	Points	Rank	Points
01	Belgium	5	3	1	1	1	2	10	18	
02	Czech Republic	15	15	14	12	18	14		21	
03	Netherlands	16	16	13	7	14	12		22	
04	Azerbaijan	2	4	3	4	11	4	7	2	10
05	Hungary	9	10	5	17	6	9	2	13	
06	Italy	20	23	21	16	21	21		17	
07	Israel	3	5	6	3	7	5	6	16	
08	Bulgaria	12	9	10	15	5	10	1	9	2
09	Sweden	10	7	9	8	8	7	4	10	1
10	Germany	22	24	23	23	24	24		20	
11	France	14	11	22	13	10	13		14	
12	Poland	6	12	16	9	9	11		3	8
13	Australia	7	6	8	11	2	6	5	7	4
14	Cyprus	23	25	25	25	25	25		11	
15	Serbia	17	13	18	14	20	17		25	
16	Lithuania	1	1	2	2	3	1	12	8	3
17	Croatia	25	22	17	18	22	23		24	
18	Russia	21	21	24	24	12	22		1	12
19	Spain	11	14	12	20	23	16		15	
20	Latvia	4	2	4	6	4	3	8	6	5
21	Ukraine									
22	Malta	18	17	20	22	19	20		19	
23	Georgia	8	8	11	5	15	8	3	5	6
24	Austria	19	19	15	19	16	19		12	
25	United Kingdom	24	18	19	10	13	18		23	
26	Armenia	13	20	7	21	17	15		4	7

== After Eurovision ==
=== Petition for cancellation of tender results ===
Ukraine is, and will remain, the winner of the 2016 Eurovision Song Contest. Whether you agree or disagree, we call upon those who signed this petition to embrace the result, valid in accordance with the rules, and to continue a constructive dialogue about how to further strengthen and improve the Eurovision Song Contest.

— EBU,

A petition was started on Change.org on 15 May 2016 calling on the EBU and the contest's organisers to void the final results as the overall winner only placed second in both the jury and televote. The EBU later responded to the petition by stating that Jamala's win was decided upon by juries made up of professionals of the music industry and by the viewing public. The EBU went on to say that Ukraine would remain the winner, regardless of the petition's view.

=== Song release date eligibility ===
Following the contest, reports emerged of a potential rule violation in regards to the eligibility of the Ukrainian entry after a video performance of "1944" dating back to May 2015 was discovered on YouTube. The video featured Jamala performing a medley of songs, which included an early version of "1944" with different lyrics. According to the rules of the contest, songs "must not have been commercially released before the 1st of September 2015". However, the rules also specify that if a song had been made available to the public prior to that date, the entry would be evaluated for eligibility and could still compete as long as the release did not give the song an unfair competitive advantage against the other entries. On 19 May 2016, the EBU released a statement clearing the entry of any rule violations as the insignificant viewership of the video was seen as not having given the song an unfair advantage. The rule was used by the EBU in prior contest years to clear the 2013 Dutch entry and the 2013 Belarusian entry for the competition.
