= Brequette Cassie =

South African singer (born 1984)

- Born: Brequette Shane Cassie; 7 December 1984 (age 41); Cape Town, South Africa
- Origin: Spain
- Genres: Soul; jazz; R&B; Pop
- Occupations: Singer; singer; dancer
- Instruments: Vocals, guitar
- Years active: 2012–present
- Labels: Warner Music Group
- Website: Brequette Cassie Official Twitter

Brequette Shane Cassie (born 7 December 1984), known mononymously as Brequette, is a South African and Spanish pop singer and dancer.

== Career ==
In 2012, she rose to fame after participating in the talent show La Voz, where she reached the semifinals, earning the respect of singers such as David Bisbal and Rosario Flores.

In 2014, she was one of the candidates to represent Spain in the Eurovision Song Contest 2014 with the song "Más (Run)," which debuted at number 8 in Spain. At the end of June, Brequette released her second single, “Puzzle Together.”

Until 2015, she performed throughout the Iberian Peninsula, the Canary Islands, and the Balearic Islands, both individually and accompanied by the Festival de Naciones and the Gala Drag Queen.

In 2016, Brequette fulfilled her dream of participating in Eurovision, this time as a backing vocalist for Barei and her song Say Yay!.

In 2017, thanks to massive support from Eurofans, she ran as a candidate to represent Spain in Eurovision 2017, this time alongside the former Spanish representative in 2016, Barei. Brequette submitted three R&B-style songs in English to TVE.

In 2018, Brequette released her new single, “Up To You,” which made it onto the iTunes best-seller list.

In 2021, she participated in the Telecinco program Top Star. ¿Cuánto vale tu voz? (Top Star How Much Is Your Voice Worth?), which she won.

== Discography ==
=== Singles ===
- More (Run) (2014)
- Puzzle Together (2014)
- On My Own (2015)
- No Enemy (2018)
- Up To You (2018)
