= Spain in the Eurovision Song Contest 2016 =

- Eurovision Song Contest 2016
- Participating broadcaster: Radiotelevisión Española (RTVE)
- Country: Spain
- Selection process: Objetivo Eurovisión 2016
- Selection date: 1 February 2016

Competing entry
- Song: "Say Yay!"
- Artist: Barei
- Songwriters: Bárbara Reyzábal; Rubén Villanueva; Víctor Púa Vivó

Placement
- Final result: 22nd, 77 points

Participation chronology

Spain was represented at the Eurovision Song Contest 2016 with the song "Say Yay!", written by Bárbara Reyzábal, Rubén Villanueva, and Víctor Púa Vivó, and performed by Reyzábal herself under her stage name Barei. The Spanish participating broadcaster, Radiotelevisión Española (RTVE), organised the national final Objetivo Eurovisión in order to select its entry for the contest. Six artists and songs competed in the televised show where an in-studio jury, an international jury and a public televote selected "Say Yay!" performed by Barei as the winner.

As a member of the "Big Five", Spain automatically qualified to compete in the final of the Eurovision Song Contest. Performing in position 19, Spain placed twenty-second out of the 26 participating countries with 77 points.

== Background ==
Prior to the 2016 contest, Televisión Española (TVE) until 2006, and Radiotelevisión Española (RTVE) since 2007, had participated in the Eurovision Song Contest representing Spain fifty-five times since TVE's first entry in 1961. They have won the contest on two occasions: in 1968 with the song "La, la, la" performed by Massiel and in 1969 with the song "Vivo cantando" performed by Salomé, the latter having won in a four-way tie with France, the Netherlands, and the United Kingdom. They have also finished second four times, with "En un mundo nuevo" by Karina in 1971, "Eres tú" by Mocedades in 1973, "Su canción" by Betty Missiego in 1979, and "Vuelve conmigo" by Anabel Conde in 1995. In 2015, RTVE placed twenty-first with the song "Amanecer" performed by Edurne.

As part of its duties as participating broadcaster, RTVE organises the selection of its entry in the Eurovision Song Contest and broadcasts the event in the country. RTVE confirmed its intentions to participate at the 2016 contest on 14 September 2015. In 2015, RTVE selected both the artist and song that would compete at the Eurovision Song Contest via an internal selection. For their 2016 entry, the broadcaster announced on 18 December 2015 that it would organise a national final similar in format to the one used previously in 2014, which featured a competition among several artists and songs.

== Before Eurovision ==
=== Objetivo Eurovisión ===
Objetivo Eurovisión was the national final organised by RTVE that took place on 1 February 2016 at the Adisar Studios in Villaviciosa de Odón (Madrid), hosted by Anne Igartiburu with Julia Varela acting as the green room host. The show was broadcast on La 1 as well as online via RTVE's official website rtve.es and the official Eurovision Song Contest website eurovision.tv. Six artists and songs competed with the winner being decided upon through a combination of public televoting, an in-studio expert jury and an international jury. The national final was watched by 1.669 million viewers in Spain with a market share of 9.1%. The international jury consisted of television, radio and music professionals selected by the following broadcasters that are part of the European Broadcasting Union: France Télévisions (France), RAI (Italy), SVT (Sweden) and BBC (United Kingdom). The three members of the in-studio jury that evaluated the entries during the final were:

- Loreen – Singer, music producer, won Eurovision for Sweden in 2012
- Edurne – Singer, actress, television presenter, represented Spain in 2015
- Carlos Marín – Baritone, member of classical crossover group Il Divo

==== Competing entries ====
On 18 December 2015, RTVE invited the Spanish public to propose their ideal candidates for the national final by using the hashtag #euroapuesta in their social media posts. The most popular proposals were Xuso Jones, Raúl Gómez and Maverick. Among female performers, the most popular were María Isabel, Eva Ruiz, María Villalón, and Lorena Gómez. Former national final participants Brequette, Coral Segovia, and Jorge González were also among the recommendations. The six competing acts were announced on 29 December 2015 via RTVE's official website and social media platforms. Among the competing artists was María Isabel who won the Junior Eurovision Song Contest for Spain in 2004 with the song "Antes muerta que sencilla". 30-second clips of the competing songs were previewed by RTVE on their official website on 19 January 2016, while the songs in their entirety were premiered a day later on 20 January on a special webcast show, presented by Irene Mahía and with three of the candidates (Electric Nana, Maverick and Salvador Beltrán) as guests, that was also broadcast on RTVE's official website.

Artist	Song	Songwriter(s)
Barei	"Say Yay!"	Bárbara Reyzábal; Rubén Villanueva; Víctor Púa Vivó
Electric Nana	"Now"	Mónica Vázquez
María Isabel	"La vida sólo es una"	David Santisteban
Maverick	"Un mundo más feliz"	Juan Magán; Darlyn Cuevas "DCS"; Luiggi Giussepe Olivares
Salvador Beltrán	"Días de alegría"	Salvador Beltrán; Miguel Ángel Arenas "Capi"
Xuso Jones	"Victorious"	Andreas Öhrn; Peter Boström; Chris Wahle

==== Final ====
The televised final took place on 1 February 2016. The running order for the six participating entries was determined during a press conference held at Prado del Rey in Pozuelo de Alarcón (Madrid) on 28 January 2016. The winner, "Say Yay!" performed by Barei, was selected through the combination of the votes of an in-studio jury (30%), the votes of an international jury (30%) and a public televote (40%). "Say Yay!" is the first song performed entirely in the English language that was selected to represent Spain at the Eurovision Song Contest. In addition to the performances of the competing entries, guest performers included former national final participants Brequette, Jorge González, Coral Segovia and Mirela, and former Eurovision contestants Loreen, Edurne and the group D'Nash which represented Spain in 2007.

Objetivo Eurovisión – 1 February 2016
R/O	Artist	Song	Intl. jury	Studio jury	Televote		Total	Place
R/O	Artist	Song	Intl. jury	Studio jury	Percentage	Points	Total	Place
1	Maverick	"Un mundo más feliz"	21	21	6.10%	24	66	6
2	Barei	"Say Yay!"	30	36	38.22%	48	114	1
3	Xuso Jones	"Victorious"	24	30	29.55%	40	94	2
4	Salvador Beltrán	"Días de alegría"	36	16	4.23%	20	72	3
5	María Isabel	"La vida sólo es una"	18	18	15.69%	32	68	4
6	Electric Nana	"Now"	15	23	6.21%	28	66	5

Detailed International Jury Votes
R/O	Song	Italy	France	United Kingdom	Sweden	Total	Points
1	"Un mundo más feliz"	5	8	7	8	28	21
2	"Say Yay!"	10	10	8	10	38	30
3	"Victorious"	6	12	10	5	33	24
4	"Días de alegría"	12	6	12	12	42	36
5	"La vida sólo es una"	7	7	6	7	27	18
6	"Now"	8	5	5	6	24	15

Detailed In-Studio Jury Votes
R/O	Song	Loreen	Edurne	C. Marín	Total
1	"Un mundo más feliz"	7	6	8	21
2	"Say Yay!"	12	12	12	36
3	"Victorious"	10	10	10	30
4	"Días de alegría"	6	5	5	16
5	"La vida sólo es una"	5	7	6	18
6	"Now"	8	8	7	23

Members of the International Jury
Jury	Members
Italy – RAI	Nicola Caligiore – Head of the Delegation for Italy at Eurovision and International relations at RAI; Marta Cagnola – Journalist, presented and music expert; Eddy Anselmi – Journalist with expertise in the Sanremo Music Festival and the Eurovision Song Contest; Emanuele Lombardini – Journalist and blogger, founder of the website EurofestivalNews.; Cristina Giuntini – President of OGAE Italy
France – France Télévisions	Edoardo Grassi – Head of the Delegation for France at Eurovision; Franck Saurat – Television producer; Roberto Ciurleo – Director of Virgin Radio; Anggun – Singer, represented France in 2012; Antoine Gouiffes-Yan – Director of Marketing for Warner Music France
United Kingdom – BBC	Helen Riddell – Co-Head of the Delegation for the United Kingdom at Eurovision; Andrew Cartmell – Television producer; Reshmi Bajnath – Independent television producer; Gemma Hodgson – BBC producer; Hugh Goldsmith – Founder of Innocent Records and ex-director of RCA Records
Sweden – SVT	Christer Björkman – Head of the Delegation for Sweden at Eurovision, producer of the 2016 Eurovision and Melodifestivalen; Samuel Andersson – Assistant Contest Producer for the Eurovision Song Contest 2016; Leydis Manso – Musician; Maria Ericson – Artist manager; Åsa Paues – PR manager, Eurovision press officer, eurofan

=== Preparation ===
The official video of the song, directed by Gus Carballo, was filmed in February 2016 in different locations in Madrid, mainly in a tunnel at Las Tablas neighbourhood, and also features scenes filmed in Barcelona, Berlin, Havana, London, Miami, and Stockholm. The video premiered on 10 March 2016 on RTVE's website. The music video served as the official preview video for the Spanish entry.

=== Promotion ===
Barei made several appearances across Europe to specifically promote "Say Yay!" as the Spanish Eurovision entry. On 13 February, Barei performed "Say Yay! during the second semi-final of the Ukrainian Eurovision national final. On 2 April, she performed "Say Yay!" at the Eurovision Pre-Party in Riga, Latvia, held at the Spikeri Concert Hall. On 3 April, she performed during the Eurovision Pre-Party in Moscow, Russia, held at the Izvestyia Hall and hosted by Dmitry Guberniev. On 9 April, Barei performed during the Eurovision in Concert event which was held at the Melkweg venue in Amsterdam, Netherlands and hosted by Cornald Maas and Hera Björk. She was confirmed to perform the song at the Israel Calling in Tel Aviv, Israel on 12 April, but she withdrew from the event due to "production delays". On 17 April, Barei performed during the London Eurovision Party, which was held at the Café de Paris venue in London, United Kingdom and hosted by Nicki French and Paddy O'Connell.

In addition to her international appearances, she performed the song on the morning show La mañana on La 1 on 3 February. On 5 March, Barei performed an acoustic version of "Say Yay!" at the El Intruso club in Madrid as a part of the city's Ellas Son-Arte festival. On 29 March, Barei performed an acoustic version of the song during the #0 talk show programme Likes. On 28 April, a farewell party was held for Barei before she travelled to Stockholm for the contest, which took place at the Swedish Embassy in Madrid, hosted by Ambassador Cecilia Julin. On 29 April, she performed during a Spanish Eurovision party, which took place at the Palacio de la Prensa in Madrid, hosted by Julia Varela.

== At Eurovision ==
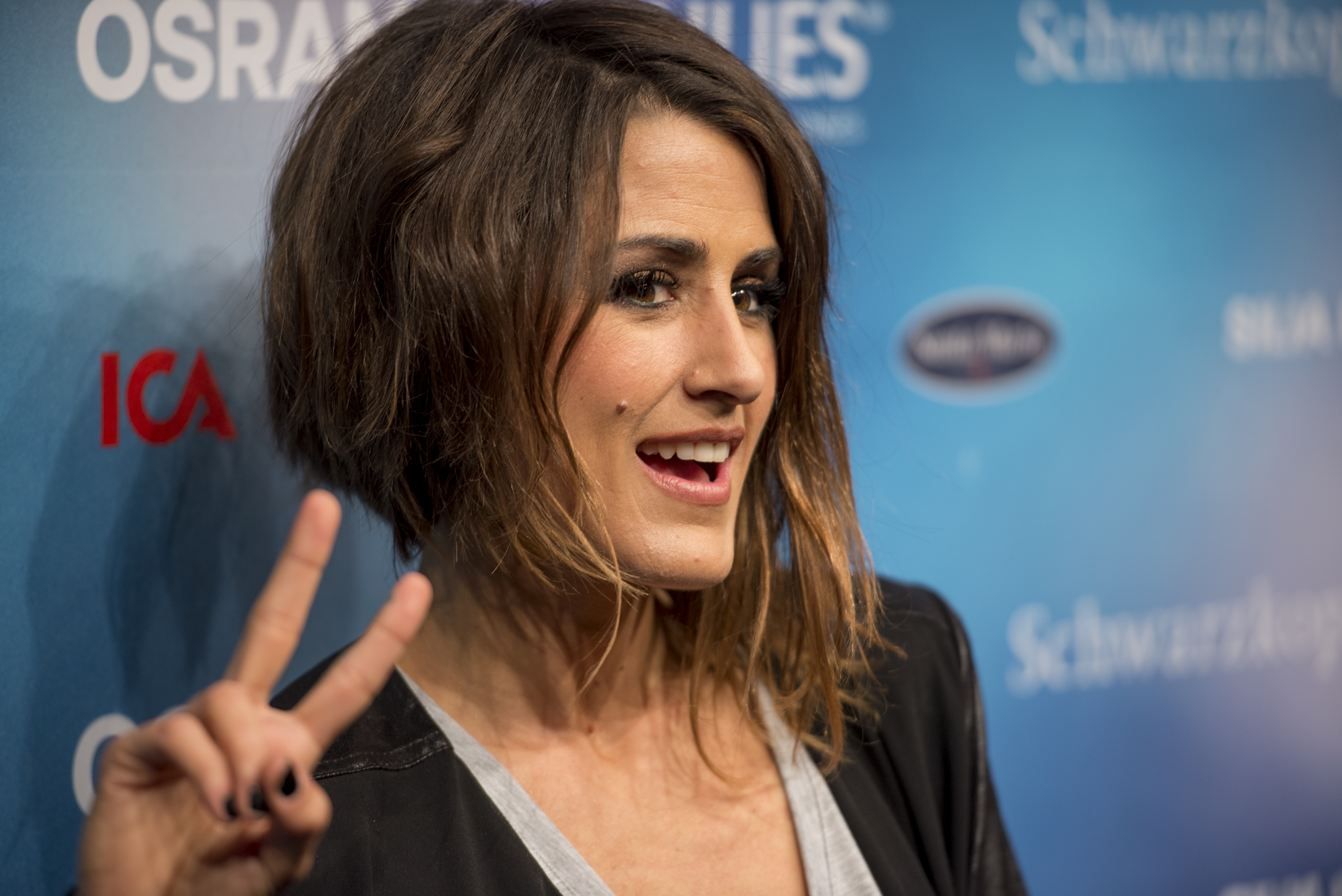
Barei during a press meet and greet

According to Eurovision rules, all nations with the exceptions of the host country and the "Big Five" (France, Germany, Italy, Spain and the United Kingdom) are required to qualify from one of two semi-finals in order to compete for the final; the top ten countries from each semi-final progress to the final. As a member of the "Big Five", Spain automatically qualified to compete in the final on 14 May 2016. In addition to their participation in the final, Spain is also required to broadcast and vote in one of the two semi-finals. During the semi-final allocation draw on 25 January 2016, Spain was assigned to broadcast and vote in the first semi-final on 10 May 2016.

In Spain, the semi-finals were broadcast on La 2 and the final was broadcast on La 1 with commentary by José María Íñigo and Julia Varela. RTVE appointed Jota Abril as its spokesperson to announce during the final the top 12-point score awarded by the Spanish jury.

=== Final ===
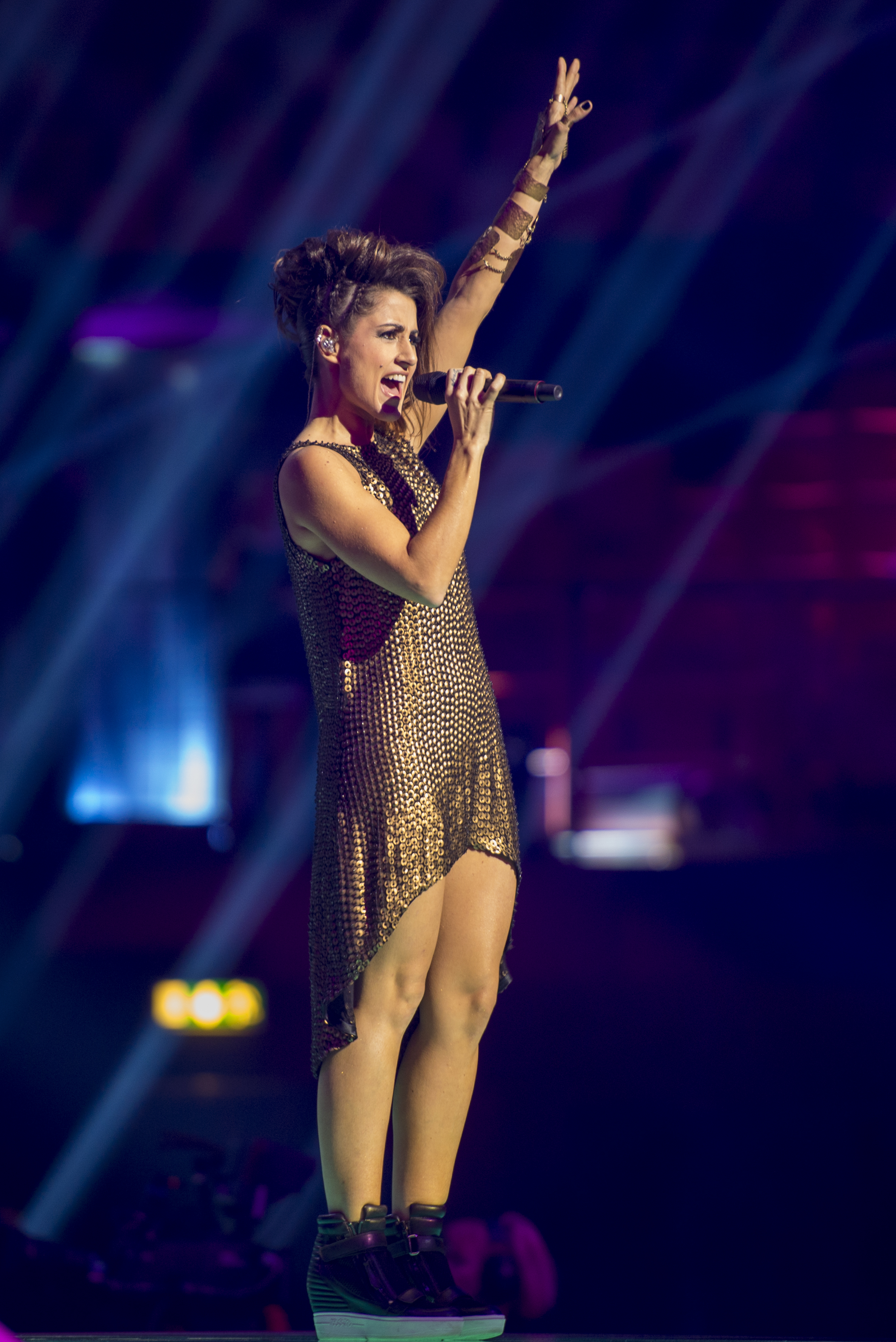
Barei during a rehearsal before the final

Barei took part in technical rehearsals on 6 and 8 May, followed by dress rehearsals on 9, 13, and 14 May. This included the semi-final jury show on 9 May where an extended clip of the Spanish performance was filmed for broadcast during the live show on 10 May and the jury final on 13 May where the professional juries of each country watched and voted on the competing entries. During the opening ceremony festivities that took place on 8 May, Barei took part in a draw to determine in which half of the final the Spanish entry would be performed. Spain was drawn to compete in the second half. Following the conclusion of the second semi-final, the shows' producers decided upon the running order of the final. The running order for the semi-finals and final was decided by the shows' producers rather than through another draw, so that similar songs were not placed next to each other. Spain was subsequently placed to perform in position 19, following the entry from Russia and before the entry from Latvia.

The Spanish performance featured Barei on stage wearing a golden bronze dress, joined by four backing vocalists wearing black dresses; an additional off-stage backing vocalist was also part of the performance. The stage lighting and LED screens displayed neon colours and geometric shapes. Barei began the performance on the main stage and did a dance routine with her backing vocalists before walking down the catwalk and finishing the song on the satellite stage. During the performance, Barei fell down; the incorporation of the move was explained by the singer during a press conference: "We thought about it when recording the music video, like I'm talking about failure and not throwing the towel. You need to go for your dreams and failure can come any time, you don't know when, and this fall on stage is a symbol, that it could happen right there." The stage director for the performance was Florian Boje with choreography completed by Laura García. The five backing vocalists that joined Barei were Rebeca Rods, Milena Brody, Alana Sinkëy, Awinnie MyBaby and Brequette. Rods was a backing vocalist for Spain in 2007 and 2012, Brody was a backing vocalist for Spain in 2013, Sinkëy and MyBaby were backing vocalists for Spain in 2014, while Brequette was the runner-up in the 2014 Spanish national final. Spain placed twenty-second in the final, scoring 77 points: 10 points from the televoting and 67 points from the juries.

=== Voting ===
Voting during the three shows was conducted under a new system that involved each country now awarding two sets of points from 1-8, 10 and 12: one from their professional jury and the other from televoting. Each participating broadcaster assembles a five-member jury panel consisting of music industry professionals who are citizens of the country they represent, with their names published before the contest to ensure transparency. This jury judged each entry based on: vocal capacity; the stage performance; the song's composition and originality; and the overall impression by the act. In addition, no member of a national jury was permitted to be related in any way to any of the competing acts in such a way that they cannot vote impartially and independently. The individual rankings of each jury member as well as the nation's televoting results were released shortly after the grand final.

Below is a breakdown of points awarded to Spain and awarded by Spain in the first semi-final and grand final of the contest, and the breakdown of the jury voting and televoting conducted during the two shows:

==== Points awarded to Spain ====
Points awarded to Spain (Final)
Score	Televote	Jury
12 points		Italy
10 points		
8 points		Moldova
7 points		Norway
6 points		Albania
5 points		Australia; Hungary; Poland
4 points	United Kingdom	Bulgaria; Israel
3 points		Armenia; France
2 points	Australia; Switzerland	Malta
1 point	France; Sweden	Azerbaijan; Denmark; Sweden

==== Points awarded by Spain ====
Points awarded by Spain (Semi-final 1)
Score	Televote	Jury
12 points	Austria	Armenia
10 points	Armenia	Hungary
8 points	Russia	Russia
7 points	Czech Republic	Malta
6 points	Netherlands	Czech Republic
5 points	Hungary	Azerbaijan
4 points	Iceland	Netherlands
3 points	Cyprus	Finland
2 points	Croatia	Iceland
1 point	Malta	Cyprus

Points awarded by Spain (Final)
Score	Televote	Jury
12 points	Bulgaria	Armenia
10 points	France	Hungary
8 points	Russia	Australia
7 points	Ukraine	France
6 points	Armenia	Malta
5 points	Poland	Italy
4 points	Australia	Russia
3 points	Italy	Netherlands
2 points	Austria	Azerbaijan
1 point	Sweden	Israel

==== Detailed voting results ====
The following members comprised the Spanish jury:

- Mónica Vázquez Ruiz (Electric Nana; jury chairperson) – songwriter, artist
- Salvador Beltrán – songwriter, artist
- Maverick López Sánchez (Maverick) – singer
- Jesús Segovia Pérez (Xuso Jones) – musician, composer, artist, producer
- Coral Segovia – singer

Detailed voting results from Spain (Semi-final 1)
R/O	Country	Jury							Televote	
R/O	Country	Electric Nana	S. Beltrán	Maverick	X. Jones	C. Segovia	Rank	Points	Rank	Points
01	Finland	9	8	10	5	10	8	3	14	
02	Greece	15	16	17	18	17	17		15	
03	Moldova	13	13	16	10	14	14		13	
04	Hungary	4	1	2	2	4	2	10	6	5
05	Croatia	12	7	11	14	8	11		9	2
06	Netherlands	1	10	9	1	13	7	4	5	6
07	Armenia	2	2	1	3	2	1	12	2	10
08	San Marino	18	18	18	17	16	18		12	
09	Russia	11	6	3	4	1	3	8	3	8
10	Czech Republic	7	3	7	6	5	5	6	4	7
11	Cyprus	8	12	14	7	7	10	1	8	3
12	Austria	10	14	8	11	9	12		1	12
13	Estonia	14	9	15	12	12	13		11	
14	Azerbaijan	6	4	4	13	3	6	5	17	
15	Montenegro	16	17	12	16	18	16		18	
16	Iceland	5	11	6	9	11	9	2	7	4
17	Bosnia and Herzegovina	17	15	13	15	15	15		16	
18	Malta	3	5	5	8	6	4	7	10	1

Detailed voting results from Spain (Final)
R/O	Country	Jury							Televote	
R/O	Country	Electric Nana	S. Beltrán	Maverick	X. Jones	C. Segovia	Rank	Points	Rank	Points
01	Belgium	6	18	5	22	21	15		11	
02	Czech Republic	17	13	19	11	4	11		23	
03	Netherlands	2	15	10	2	18	8	3	13	
04	Azerbaijan	22	12	6	13	5	9	2	22	
05	Hungary	10	1	2	4	7	2	10	16	
06	Italy	9	10	7	9	6	6	5	8	3
07	Israel	18	4	11	10	17	10	1	19	
08	Bulgaria	12	21	16	8	10	12		1	12
09	Sweden	4	5	17	23	20	14		10	1
10	Germany	21	20	20	21	22	23		17	
11	France	3	11	3	3	12	4	7	2	10
12	Poland	23	22	21	19	23	25		6	5
13	Australia	11	3	4	6	3	3	8	7	4
14	Cyprus	20	17	24	12	8	19		14	
15	Serbia	16	8	22	20	15	18		25	
16	Lithuania	25	24	15	17	9	21		12	
17	Croatia	19	16	13	18	13	17		24	
18	Russia	14	6	8	14	1	7	4	3	8
19	Spain									
20	Latvia	8	14	12	15	19	13		18	
21	Ukraine	13	19	18	16	16	20		4	7
22	Malta	5	9	9	5	11	5	6	21	
23	Georgia	7	23	25	25	25	24		20	
24	Austria	24	25	14	24	14	22		9	2
25	United Kingdom	15	7	23	7	24	16		15	
26	Armenia	1	2	1	1	2	1	12	5	6
