= Sunsay =

Ukrainian band

SunSay
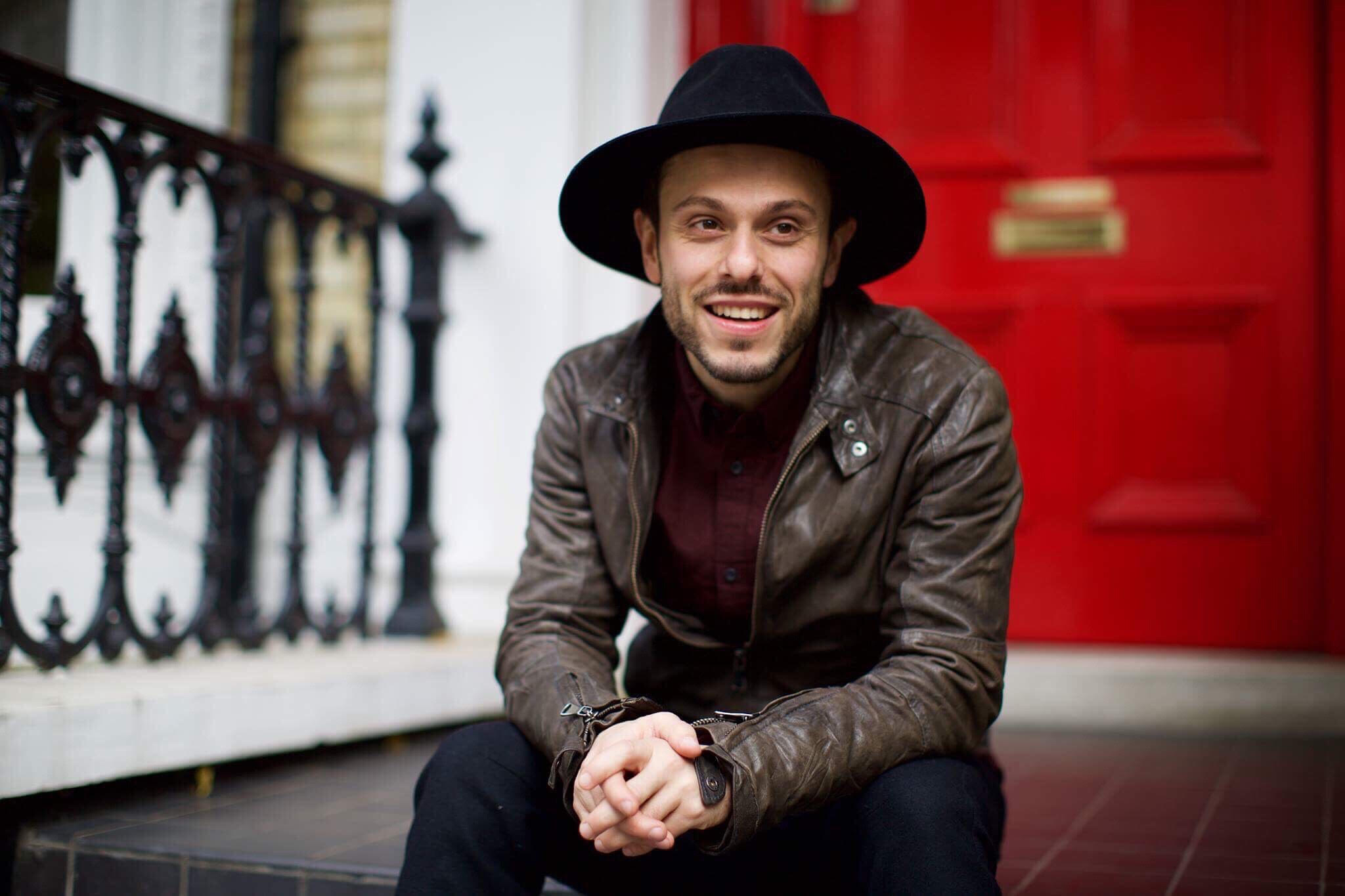
- Andriy Zaporozhets vocalist of the band

Background information
- Origin: Kharkiv, Ukraine
- Genres: Fusion (music); funk; reggae
- Years active: 2007 – present
- Members: Andriy Zaporozhets - Vocals; Ruslan Gadzhimuradov - Drums; Stanislav Smirnov - Keys; Sergey Klevensky - Woodwinds; Roman Kucherenko - Bass; Denys Kharlashin - Guitar; Pavel Tolstoy - Bass; Vladimir Boytsov - Audio Engineer; Nina Marchenko - manager
- Past members: Grigoriy Chayka; Konstantin Chalyh; Kobylyansky Andriy; Vitaliy Oniskevich; Ighor Fadeyev; Vyacheslav Semenchenko; Ighoe Sirodzha; Bek Bekson; Tosilia Chaykina; Vladislava Lefor; Sergey Balalayev
- Website: sunsaymusic.com

SunSay (correct pronunciation /sæn'sei/) is a Ukrainian fusion-funk-reggae music band founded in 2007 by Andriy Zaporozhets, a Ukrainian singer-songwriter and front man of the 5'nizza group. The band's initial stock of songs was based on reworked tracks of the unreleased third album of 5'nizza. SunSay performs songs in Russian, Ukrainian, and English.

== History ==
SunSay as a musical project, was founded in 2007, when Andriy Zaporozhets took a decision to expand musical capacity of 5'nizza. In the course of album recording, the world saw a new music album "SunSay", released by the newly formed similarly-named music band, with Andrew Zaporozhets as founder and front man.

Expansion of the instrumental accompaniment to keyboards, electric and bass guitar brought more possibilities for creativity which let SunSay combine in its music various styles, including reggae, funk, fusion and even alternative rock. The first album of "SunSay" was successfully presented live in the rock-club Apelsin in Oct 2007.

The lineup of SunSay at that time comprised 5 members: Andriy Zaporozhets (vocals) – vocalist of the band 5'Nizza; Yefim Chupakhin (keyboards) – pianist (works with Sergey Babkin and "Acoustic Quartet"); Sergei Balalaev (drums) – drummer of the "Acoustic Quartet"; Grigory Chaika (guitar) – guitarist and vocalist of the bands "Kislorod" and "4.A.Y.K.A."); Igor Fadeev (bass guitar) – bass guitarist. Besides Vadim Sergeyev (guitar), Roman Parygin (trumpet) Alexei Kanev (sax) and Sergei Clevensky, who were also invited to feature in the music album production.

The second album «Diver» had been produced at Bolshakov recording studio and released in March in Kyiv. In the same year Andriy Zaporozhets a.k.a. Sunsay recorded together with "My Rockets Up" a track "Wanchucha", which was included in "Listen to Me" music album. Later in 2011 Konstantine Chalyh ("My Rockets Up") stepped into SunSay as standing guitar player.

As of July 2017 SunSay's discography includes 6 albums and a range of singles performed together with other popular singers and music makers.

In winter 2016 SunSay was one of the leaders of the second semi-final of the national selection of the Eurovision Song Contest. Its song "Love Manifest" brought the band to final where SunSay and other nominees (The Hardkiss, Pur:Pur, Brunettes Shoot Blondes and NuAngels) conceded to Jamala.

== Discography ==
Studio albums:

- SunSay (2007)
- Diver // Дайвер 2010
- Easy // Легко 2011
- Praise // Благодари 2013
- V (2014)
- Above the head // Выше головы (2016)

Singles:

- "Time is a mirage" SunSay and Ivan Dorn
- "Endless Love" SunSay feat. All in Orchestra
- "Будь слабей меня/Be weaker than I"
- "Wind Song" SunSay&John Forté
- "Мама/Mum"
- "Долетим/We’ll fly to"
- "Выше головы/Above the head"
- "Love manifest"

== See also ==
- Andriy Zaporozhets (in Russian)
- 5'nizza
- Ukraine in the Eurovision Song Contest 2016
- Сергей Бабкин (in Russian)
