= Worry Worry =

Worry Worry may refer to:

- "Worry Worry", song written by Pluma Davis, Jules Taub, performed by B.B. King from Ladies and Gentlemen... Mr. B.B. King and Live in Cook County Jail
- "Worry Worry", song by The Fiery Furnaces from Gallowsbird's Bark
- "Worry, Worry" (song), by Barei, number 34 on the Spanish Singles Chart July 2017
