= Julia Varela =

Spanish radio and television journalist

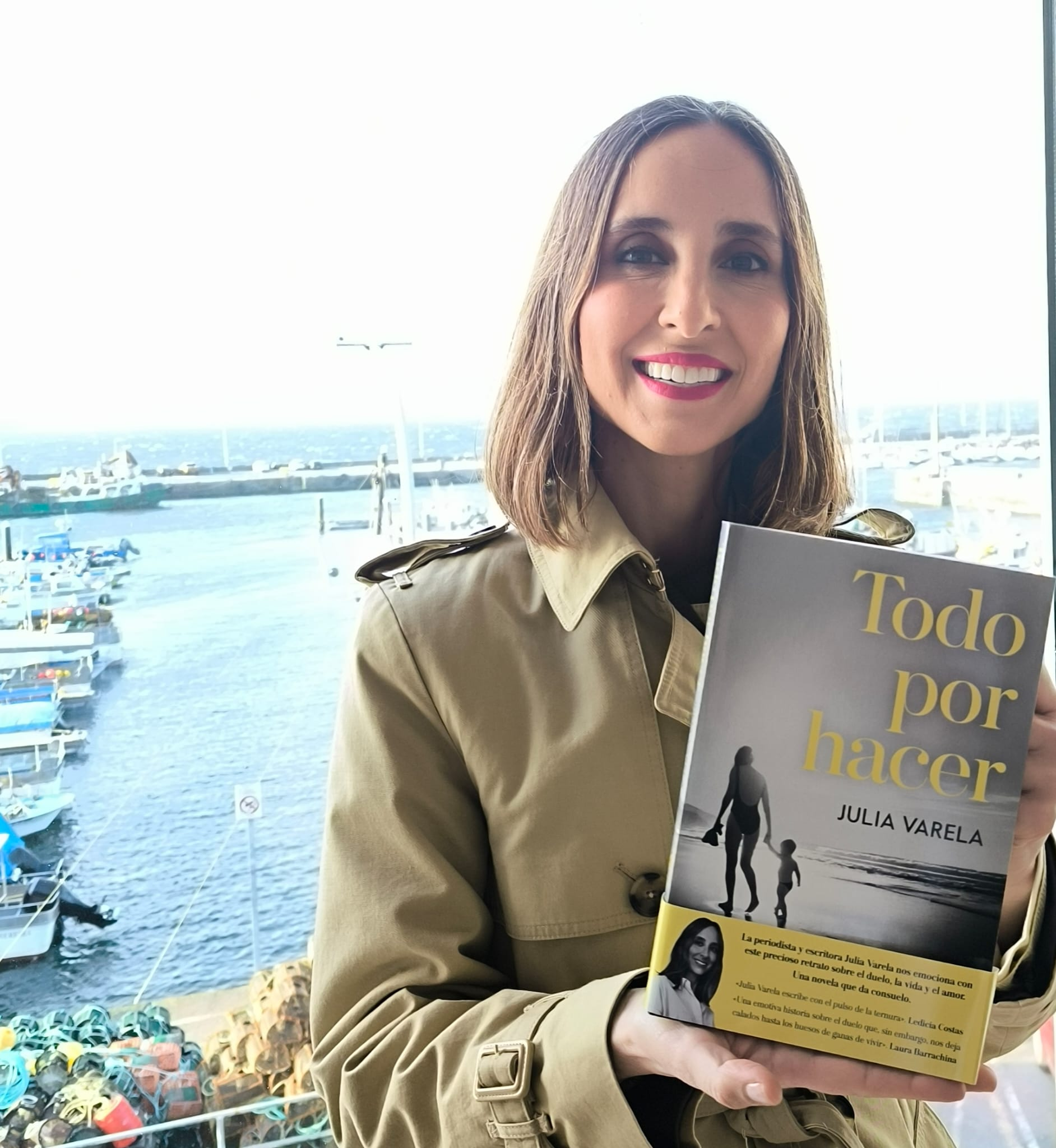
- Varela in 2026
- Born: Julia Varela Ruano; 30 June 1981 (age 45); Pontevedra, Galicia, Spain
- Education: Complutense University of Madrid
- Occupations: Journalist; presenter
- Years active: 2005–present
- Employer: RTVE

Julia Varela Ruano (born 30 June 1981) is a Spanish television and radio presenter, newsreader, reporter and director.

== Biography ==
After graduating in journalism at the Complutense University of Madrid, Varela began her professional career at RTVE in 2005 in RNE's news department as a newsreader for Radio Exterior de España. In 2008, she moved to RNE Radio 3 to work as a presenter and editor in music programmes like Siglo 21, 180 Grados or Los Conciertos de Radio 3, and in the broadcast of different music festivals.

Since 2013, Varela has worked as a TV reporter for TVE in shows like Comando Actualidad and La mañana de La 1; in the latter she was also the commentator of the show business section. From July 2019 to March 2020, Varela co-directed the daytime talk show A partir de hoy.

Since 2015, Varela has been TVE's co-commentator for the Eurovision Song Contest: until 2017 alongside José María Íñigo, and from 2018 alongside Tony Aguilar. Varela and Íñigo also provided the Spanish commentary for Eurovision Song Contest's Greatest Hits, the show that commemorated the Eurovision Song Contest's 60th anniversary, and Varela and Aguilar provided the commentary for the 2019, 2021, 2022, 2023 and 2024 Junior contests. In 2016, Varela was the green room host during Objetivo Eurovisión, the national final that selected the Spanish entry for the 2016 Contest.

In 2019, Varela authored her first novel, titled ¿Por qué me pido un gin tonic si no me gusta?.

== Works ==
=== Novels ===
- ¿Por qué me pido un gin tonic si no me gusta? (2019). Madrid: Ediciones B, Penguin Random House. ISBN 978-8466665575
- Todo por hacer (2026). Madrid: Ediciones B. ISBN 9788466682855.
