= Xuso Jones =

Spanish singer and composer

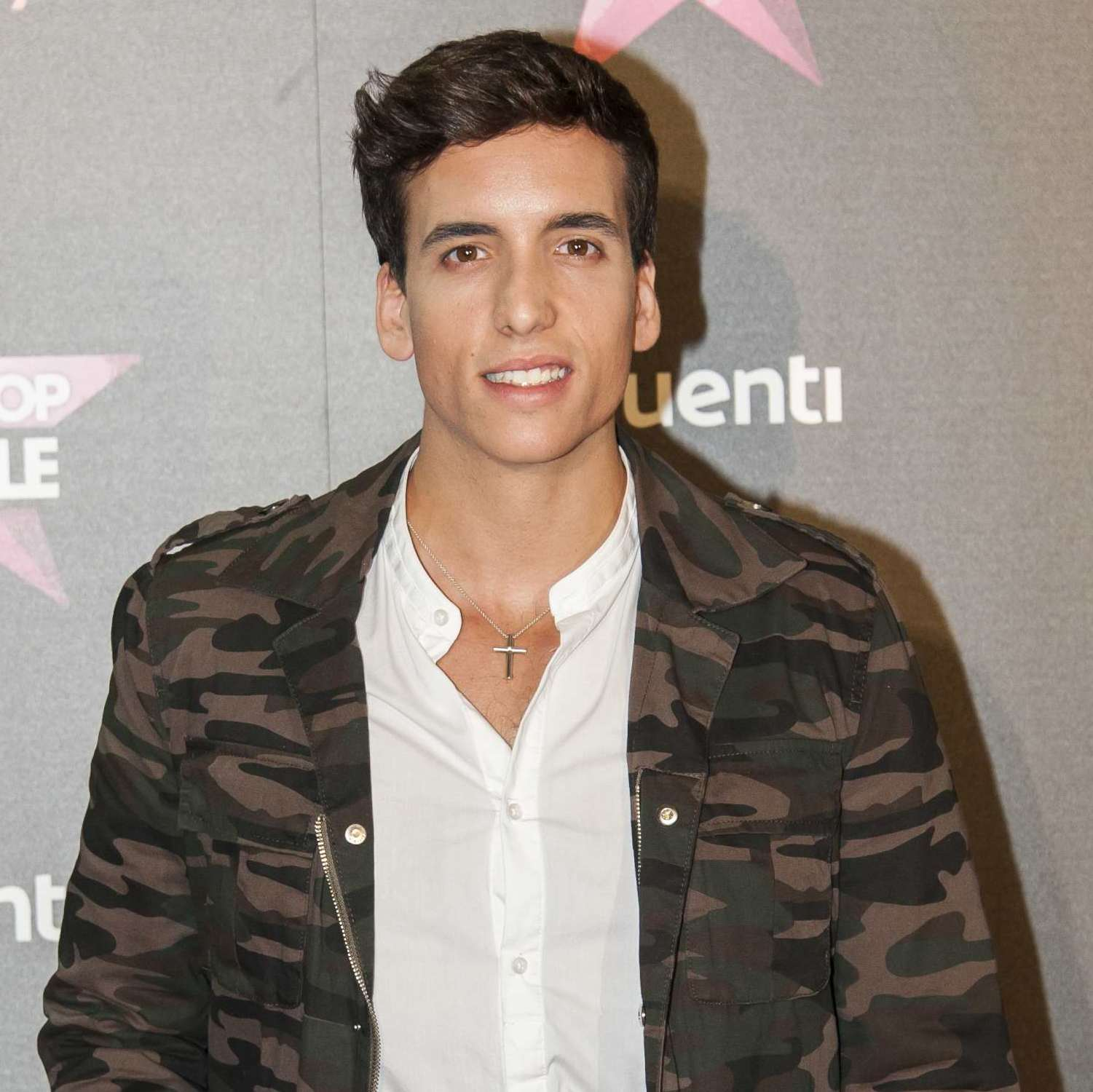

Background information
- Born: Jesús Segovia Pérez; 16 June 1989 (age 37); Murcia, Spain
- Origin: Murcia, Spain
- Genres: Pop, R&B
- Occupation: Singer-songwriter
- Instrument: Vocals
- Years active: 2012–present
- Labels: Universal Music Group; Concert Music Entertainment

Jesús Segovia Pérez (born 16 June 1989), better known by his stage name Xuso Jones, is a Spanish singer and composer.

== Biography ==
He became popular through social media doing covers to other artists and sharing original songs. He recorded a video of himself singing his order from the car in the drive-through of a McDonald's restaurant. The video became a viral hit on YouTube, and the company hired him for a Big Mac spot.

After this he went to Los Angeles where he recorded three singles and a music video. "Buy the DJ a round" took him to the number 5 on iTunes Spain. "Celebrating Life" was the second single (he would include them both on Part 1, his first studio album). He was nominated for Best Spanish New Artist on the 2012 edition of Los Premios 40 Principales, losing out to Auryn.

Xuso served as the warm-up act for Justin Bieber and Selena Gomez in Spain. In 2013-2014, he participated in the third season of Spanish TV show Tu cara me suena imitating Shawn Mendes, where famous artists have to impersonate iconic singers on stage.

On 19 May 2015, Xuso released his second studio album, Vuela.

On 29 December 2015, Xuso was announced as one of the six candidates to represent Spain in the Eurovision Song Contest 2016. He took part in the televised national final organised by TVE with "Victorious", a song composed by Andreas Öhrn, Peter Boström and Chris Wahle. He came 2nd with 94 points, 20 from winning and going to Eurovision.

In September 2018 he participated in the cooking show MasterChef Celebrity. He was the second contestant to be eliminated.

He graduated in Tourism from the Universidad Católica San Antonio de Murcia.

== Discography ==
=== Albums ===
Year	Title	Information	Spain ESP
2013	Part 1	Released: 2013; Universal Music Group	18
2015	Vuela	Released: 19 May 2015; Concert Music Entertainment	13

=== Singles ===
List of singles, with selected chart positions
Year	Title	Peak chart positions	Album
Year	Title	ESP	Album
2012	"Buy the DJ a Round"	17	Part 1
2012	"Celebrating Life"	—	Part 1
2013	"Turn On the Radio"	38	Part 1
2013	"Megaphone"	41	Non-album single
2014	"Todo lo que tengo"	20	Vuela
2015	"Somos"	—	Vuela
2016	"Victorious"	—	Non-album single
2018	"Como Yo" (feat. Danny Romero)	—	Non-album single

=== Soundtracks ===
Year	Title	Film/TV series
2013	"Nada es imposible"	Descubre con Tadeo
2013	"Gru, mi villano favorito"	Despicable Me 2 (Spanish issue)

== Awards ==
- Los Premios 40 Principales 2012 - Nominated for Best Spanish New Artist
- Nickelodeon Kids' Choice Awards 2014 - Nominated for Best Spanish Artist
