= Throw the Dice =

Studio album by Barei
- Released: 7 April 2015; 22 April 2016 (Reissue)
- Recorded: 2012/15
- Genre: Pop
- Label: Barei Music; Universal Music Spain

Barei chronology
Billete para no volver (2011)	Throw the Dice (2015)	You Number One (2018)

Singles from Throw the Dice
- 1. "Another's Life" Released: 18 March 2013; 2. "Foolish NaNa" Released: 7 October 2013; 3. "Wildest Horses" Released: 24 April 2014; 4. "You Fill Me Up (My Yang)" Released: 19 November 2014

Singles from Throw the Dice (Reissue)
- 1. "Say Yay!" Released: 25 January 2016

Throw the Dice is the second studio album by Spanish singer and songwriter Barei. It was released in Spain on the April 7, 2015 and was re-released on April 22, 2016. The album reached number 28 on the Spanish Albums Chart. The album includes the singles "Another's Life", "Foolish NaNa", "Wildest Horses", "You Fill Me Up (My Yang)" and "Say Yay!".

== Singles ==
"Another's Life" was released as the lead single from the album on March 18, 2013. "Foolish NaNa" was released as the second single from the album on October 7, 2013. "Wildest Horses" was released as the third single from the album on April 24, 2014. The song peaked at number 36 on the Spanish Singles Chart. "You Fill Me Up (My Yang)" was released as the fourth single from the album on November 19, 2014. "Say Yay!" was released as the lead single from the re-released album on January 25, 2016. The song peaked at number 3 on the Spanish Singles Chart. The song also charted in France and Sweden. The song represented Spain in the Eurovision Song Contest 2016, in Stockholm, Sweden. In the grand finale that was held May 14, 2016, she had received 77 points at the end of the voting, placing 22nd in a field of 26 songs.

== Track listing ==
Standard listing (2016)
No.	Title	Length
1.	"Say Yay!" (Eurovision Spain - 2016)	2:58
2.	"Super Ranger"	3:34
3.	"You Fill Me Up" (Remasterizado)	3:54
4.	"Who Plays the Drums?"	3:32
5.	"Throw the Dice" (Remasterizado)	3:46
6.	"Wildest Horses" (Remasterizado)	3:40
7.	"Jump the Gun" (Remasterizado)	3:42
8.	"Kingdom of Paradox" (Remasterizado)	3:35
9.	"Point of No Return" (Remasterizado)	3:58
10.	"Foolish NaNa" (Remasterizado)	3:23
11.	"Weather Girl" (Remasterizado)	3:42
12.	"Sacrifice" (Remasterizado)	3:31
13.	"I Don't Wanna Lose You" (Remasterizado)	3:54

== Charts ==
=== Weekly charts ===
Chart (2016)	Peak position
Spanish Albums (PROMUSICAE)	28

== Release history ==
Region	Date	Format	Label
Spain	7 April 2015	Digital download, CD	Barei Music
Spain	22 April 2016	Digital download, CD	Universal Music Spain
