= Forget It (Barei song) =

Single by Barei
- Released: 30 June 2017
- Recorded: 2016
- Genre: Pop
- Length: 3:43
- Label: Barei Music
- Songwriter(s): Bárbara Reyzábal González-Aller * Rubén Villanueva

Barei singles chronology
"Wasn't Me" (2017)	"Forget It" (2017)	"Worry, Worry" (2017)

"Forget It" is a song performed by Spanish singer/songwriter Barei. The song was released in Spain as a digital download on 30 June 2017. The song peaked at number 19 on the Spanish Singles Chart.

== Background ==
On 19 June 2017, Barei announced on Twitter that she was bringing out three new songs with different themes. "Forget It" was released in Spain as a digital download on 30 June 2017. It was the second of three song to be released by Barei week-on-week after "Wasn't Me" was released on 23 June 2017, "Worry, Worry" would be released on 7 July 2017.

== Lyric video ==
A lyric video to accompany the release of "Forget It" was first released onto YouTube on 30 June 2017 at a total length of three minutes and forty-five seconds.

== Track listing ==
Digital download
No.	Title	Length
1.	"Forget It"	3:43

== Charts ==
Chart (2017)	Peak position
Spain (PROMUSICAE)	19

== Release history ==
Region	Date	Format	Label
Spain	30 June 2017	Digital download	Barei Music
