= Say Yay! =

2016 song by Barei

Single by Barei

from the album Throw the Dice
- Released: 25 January 2016
- Recorded: 2015
- Genre: Dance-pop
- Length: 2:56
- Label: Gran Sol; Universal Music Spain
- Songwriters: Bárbara Reyzábal; Rubén Villanueva; Víctor Púa Vivó

Barei singles chronology
"Get Up and Go" (2015)	"Say Yay!" (2016)	"I Don't Need to Be You" (2017)

Music video
- "Say Yay!" on YouTube

Alternative cover
- Universal Music Spain release artwork

Eurovision Song Contest 2016 entry
- Country: Spain
- Artist: Bárbara Reyzábal
- As: Barei
- Language: English
- Composers: Bárbara Reyzábal; Rubén Villanueva; Víctor Púa Vivó
- Lyricists: Bárbara Reyzábal; Rubén Villanueva; Víctor Púa Vivó

Finals performance
- Final result: 22nd
- Final points: 77

Entry chronology
- ◄ "Amanecer" (2015)
- "Do It for Your Lover" (2017) ►

Official performance video
- "Say Yay!" (final) on YouTube

"Say Yay!" is a song recorded by Spanish singer Barei and written and composed by herself, Rubén Villanueva, and Víctor Púa Vivó. It represented Spain in the Eurovision Song Contest 2016, placing twenty-second. It is the only ever Spanish Eurovision entry that features no Spanish language lyrics. The song was released as a digital download on 25 January 2016 through Gran Sol, reaching number-one on Spanish iTunes. A new version of the song was released on 11 March 2016 via Universal Music Spain. It was included in the re-issue of Barei's 2015 album Throw the Dice.

== Background ==
=== Conception ===
"Say Yay!" was written and composed by Barei, Rubén Villanueva, and Víctor Púa Vivó.

=== Selection ===
In December 2015, Radiotelevisión Española (RTVE) announced Barei as one of the six participants of Objetivo Eurovisión, the competition organised to select their song and performer for the 61st edition of the Eurovision Song Contest. Barei performed "Say Yay!" live for the first time on Objetivo Eurovisión on 1 February 2016. The song went on to receive top scores from Spanish televoters and the in-studio jury, winning the competition and becoming the Spanish entrant for Eurovision. It is the only ever Spanish Eurovision entry that features no Spanish language lyrics.

=== Promotion ===
After being selected, Barei also performed "Say Yay!" on the morning show La mañana on La 1 of Televisión Española on 3 February. On 13 February, she performed the song at the Ukrainian national final as a special guest during the second semi-final. On 5 March, she performed an acoustic version of "Say Yay!" at the El Intruso club in Madrid as a part of the city's Ellas Son-Arte festival. On 29 March, she performed an acoustic version of the song on the talk show Likes on #0.

On 2 April, she performed "Say Yay!" at the Eurovision Pre-Party in Riga, Latvia, held at the Spikeri Concert Hall, and on 3 April, at the Eurovision Pre-Party in Moscow, Russia, held at the Izvestia Hall. Barei also performed the song during the 2016 Eurovision in Concert, the largest gathering of Eurovision artists outside of Eurovision itself, held in the Melkweg, a popular music venue in Amsterdam, Netherlands on 9 April. On 17 April, she performed during the London Eurovision Party, which was held at the Café de Paris venue in London, United Kingdom. On 28 April, she performed the song at a party in her honour at the Swedish Embassy in Madrid. On 29 April, she performed during a Spanish Eurovision party, which took place at the Palacio de la Prensa in Madrid.

=== Eurovision ===
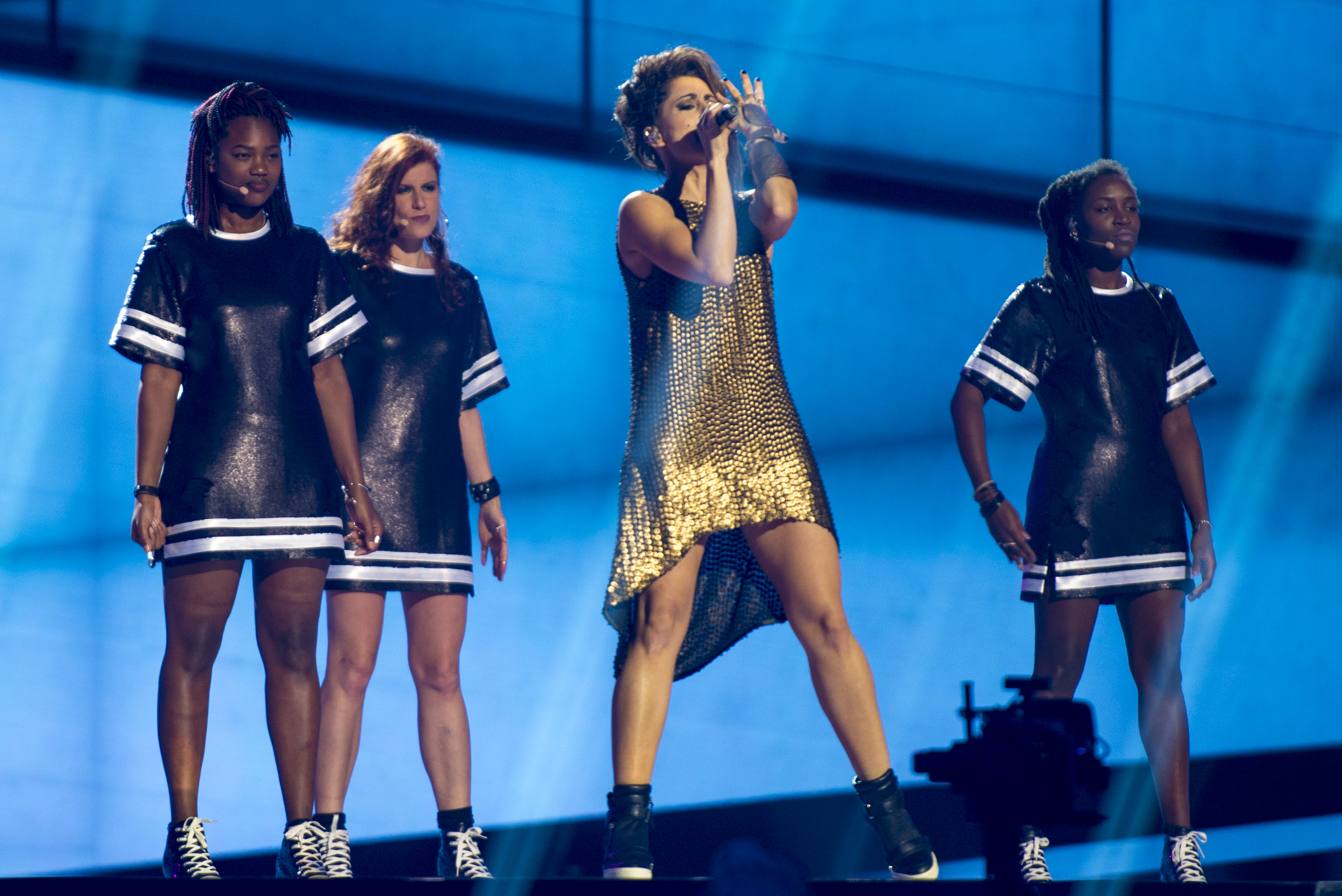
Barei performing "Say Yay!" at Eurovision.

On 14 May 2016, the final of the Eurovision Song Contest was held in the Globe Arena in Stockholm hosted by Sveriges Television (SVT) and broadcast live throughout the continent. Barei performed "Say Yay!" live nineteenth on the evening. Laura García was the choreographer for the performance, while Florian Boje was the stage director. On stage, Barei was joined by five backing vocalists: Rebeca Rods, Milena Brody, Alana Sinkëy, Awinnie MyBaby, and Brequette.

At the end of voting, the song had received 77 points placing twenty-second in a field of twenty-six songs.

== Music video ==
The official video of the song, directed by Gus Carballo, was filmed in February 2016 in different locations in Madrid, mainly in a tunnel at Las Tablas neighbourhood, and also features scenes filmed in Barcelona, Berlin, Havana, London, Miami, and Stockholm. The video premiered on 10 March 2016 on RTVE's website.

== Controversies ==
Member of the Royal Academy of Spanish Language José María Merino said that it was "unpresentable, senseless and stupid" for Spain to present a song at Eurovision without any Spanish lyrics.

== Track listing ==
Digital download (Gran Sol)
No.	Title	Length
1.	"Say Yay!"	2:56

Digital download (Universal Music Spain)
No.	Title	Length
1.	"Say Yay!"	2:56

== Charts ==
=== Weekly charts ===
Chart (2016)	Peak position
France (SNEP)	184
Spain (Promusicae)	36
Sweden (Sverigetopplistan)	63

=== Certifications ===
Region	Certification	Certified units/sales
Spain (Promusicae)	Gold	20,000^{‡}
^{‡} Sales+streaming figures based on certification alone.

== Release history ==
Region	Date	Format	Label
Worldwide	25 January 2016	Digital download	Gran Sol
Worldwide	11 March 2016	Digital download	Universal Music Spain
