= NuAngels =

Ukrainian music duo

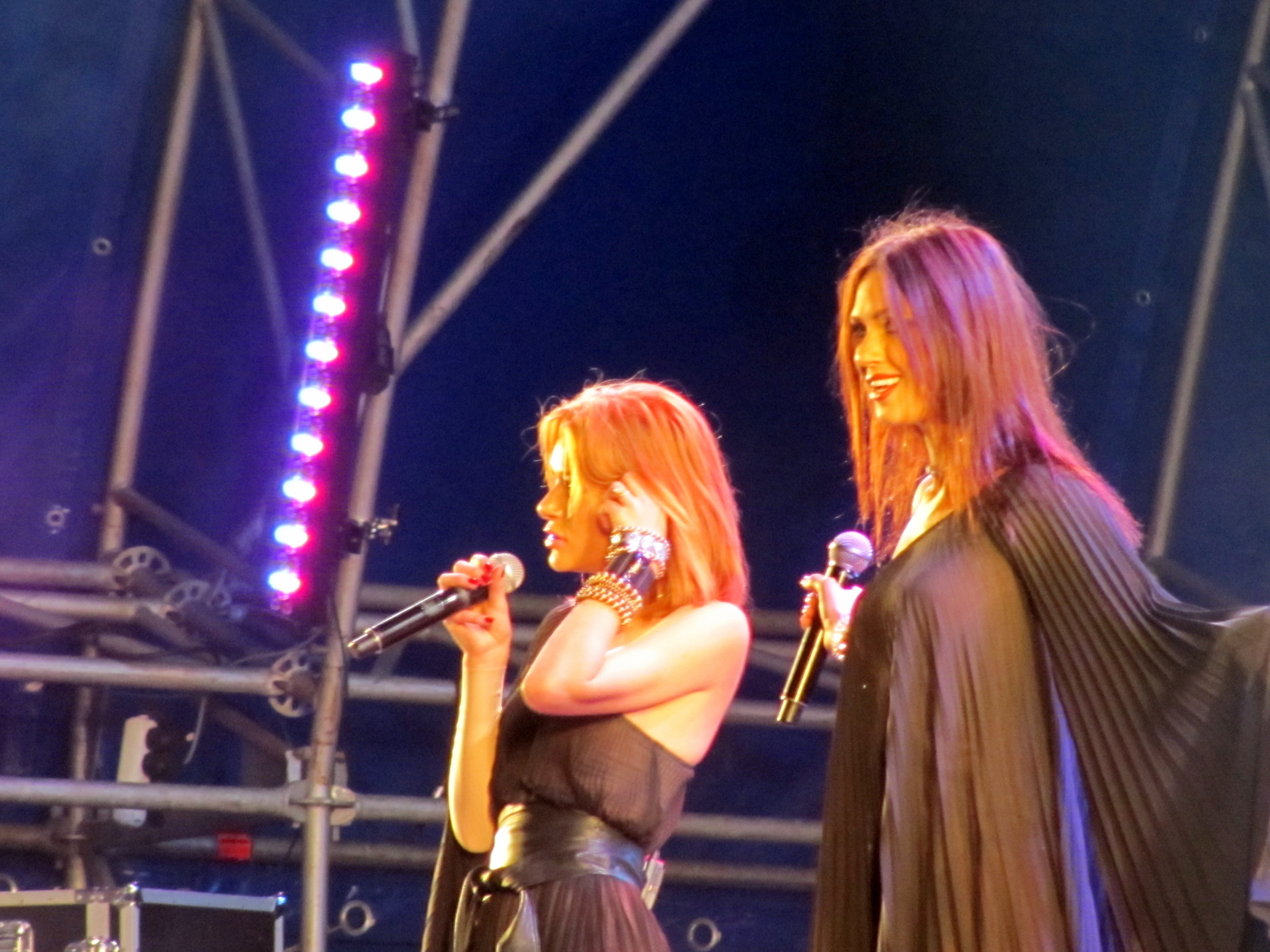

Background information
- Also known as: neAngely
- Origin: Ukraine
- Genres: Pop, dance-pop, electronic, EDM arena Pop
- Years active: 2006–2021
- Labels: mamamusic
- Members: Oksana "Slava" Kuznyetsova; Ekaterina "Viktoriya" Smeyukha
- Website: www.nuangels.com

NuAngels, also known by their former name neAngely (Ukrainian: неАнгели, Russian: неАнгелы), is a Ukrainian duo that was formed in 2006 by Ukrainian producer Yuriy Nikitin. The duo is made up of Oksana Kuznyetsova (Ukrainian: Оксана Кузнєцова, Russian: Оксана Кузнецова), known as "Slava" (Слава) and Ekaterina Smeyukha (Ukrainian: Катерина Смеюха, Russian: Екатерина Смеюха), known as "Viktoriya" (Ukrainian: Вікторія, Russian: Виктория). They perform in Russian and English.

== Career ==
The group attempted to represent Ukraine in the Eurovision Song Contest 2014 with their song "Courageous". They tied for fifth place in the Ukrainian national selection with two other competitors, earning fourth place from the jury and sixth place from the televoting. They took part in the Ukrainian national final for the Eurovision Song Contest 2016 with the song "Higher", reaching 5th overall.

== Members ==
=== Slava ===
Oksana "Slava" Kuznyetsova was born July 16, 1984 (age 41) in Odesa. Before the duo became a party involved in the project "People's Artist" and the reality show Temptation Island in 2005. She studied at the Kyiv National University of Culture and Arts with a vocal coach. She is a Lyric Contralto and got married in 2012.

=== Viktoriya ===
Ekaterina "Viktoriya" Smeyukha was born December 13, 1985 (age 40) in Kharkiv. She took part in the TV show Chance and before meeting Yuri Nikitin, Viktoriya performed solo under the name Kyra. Viktoriya started her singing career as a member of the group SMS. However, the producer of the group was later convinced that she needed to pursue a solo career. She is a deep contralto and can play the piano. Viktoriya began to study at the Kharkiv State Academy of Culture, but two years later transferred to the Kyiv National University of Culture and Arts.

== Discography ==
=== Albums ===
Russian studio albums

- Nomer Odin (2006)
- Roman (2013)

Compilations

- The Best of НеАнгелы (2015)
