= Barei (singer) =

Spanish singer-songwriter (born 1982)

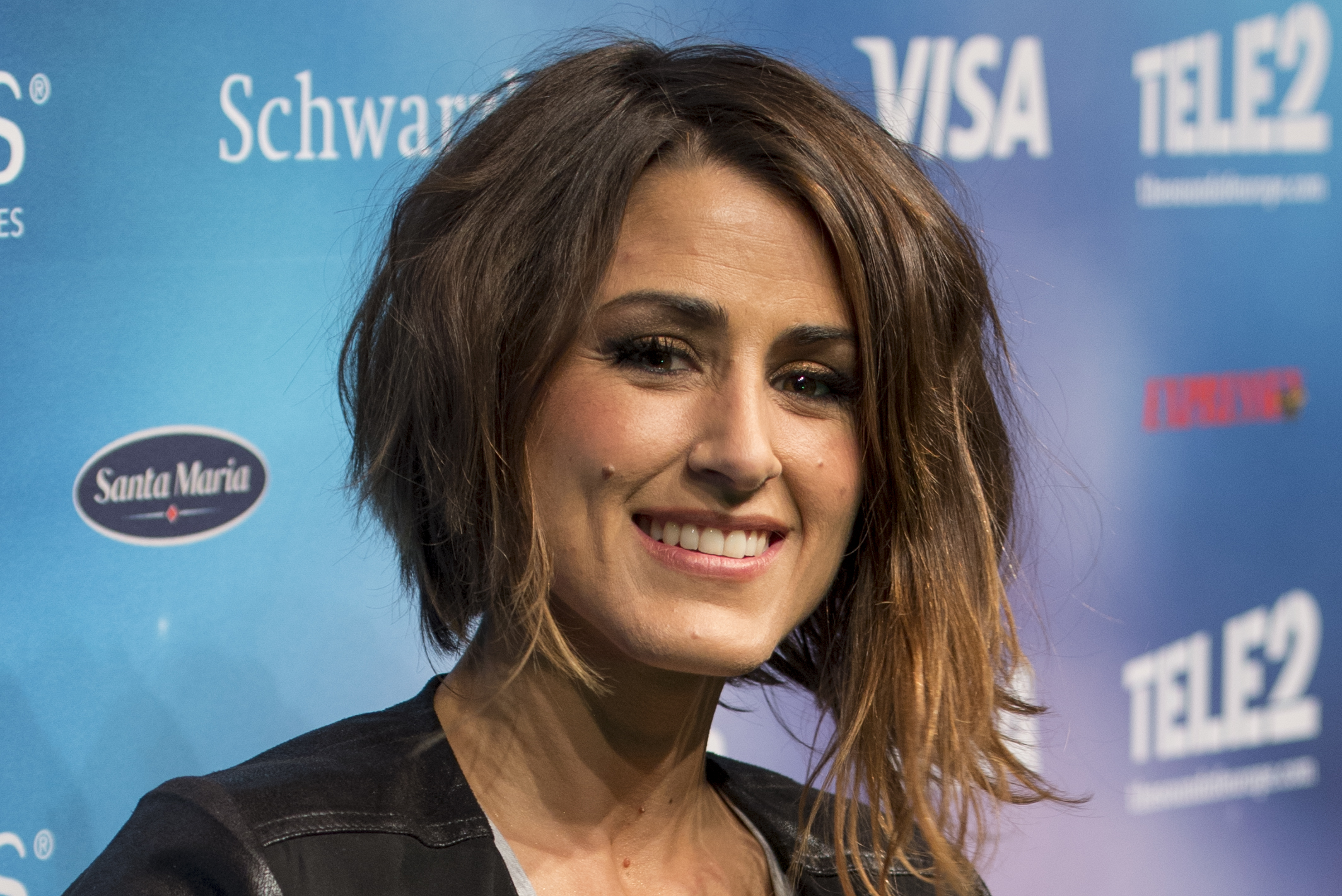
- Barei in 2016

Background information
- Born: Bárbara Reyzábal González-Aller; 29 March 1982 (age 44); Madrid, Spain
- Genres: Pop; soul; funk
- Occupations: Singer; songwriter
- Instruments: Vocals; Piano; Guitar
- Label: Universal Music Spain (2016)
- Website: www.bareimusic.com

Bárbara Reyzábal González-Aller (born 29 March 1982), known professionally as Barei, is a Spanish singer and songwriter. She represented Spain in the Eurovision Song Contest 2016 with the song "Say Yay!".

== Biography ==
=== Early life ===
Bárbara Reyzábal González-Aller was born March 29, 1982, in Madrid. She is the daughter of Teresa González-Aller Monterde and Fortunato Reyzábal Larrouy. Her father, who died shortly after she was born, belonged to the Reyzábal family, a family that was dedicated to production of films, investments in real estate properties, and the operation of party venues in Madrid. She has three siblings: Ignacio Jesús, Julián, and Lourdes. Bárbara studied singing, guitar, musical language, and piano.

=== Career beginnings ===
Bárbara began her career at 16 recording covers to songs by Christina Aguilera, Laura Pausini or Lara Fabian. In 2001, she participated in the Benidorm International Song Festival together with Gonzalo Nuche as part of a duo known as Dos Puntos with the song "Abrazo del tiempo". They got the second place. Shortly after the festival, Bárbara moved to Miami, where she recorded demos in the Latin pop genre that she decided to keep unpublished. Back in Madrid, she became a regular performer in the city's concert halls.

=== 2011–2014: Billete para no volver, and standalone singles ===
In 2011, Bárbara, adopting the stage name Barei, published her first studio album, Billete para no volver, an album fully in Spanish language produced by Rubén Villanueva. After this album, Barei began to publish standalone singles in English language every few months, beginning with "Play" in October 2012. Some of the following singles, like "Foolish NaNa" (2013), obtained success. The video of "Another's Life" (2013) got 600,000 views in YouTube, while the video of "Wildest Horses" (2014) got 1.5 million views.

=== 2014–2016: Throw the Dice ===
Barei's second album Throw the Dice, released on 7 April 2015, was strongly influenced by British and American pop, funk and soul and included some of the singles she had released the previous two years like "Foolish NaNa", "Another's Life" and "Wildest Horses". In July 2015, Barei served as the warm-up act for Lenny Kravitz at the Starlite Festival in Marbella.

In September 2015, Barei released "Time to Fight", a song she wrote together with Fernando Montesinos that served as the theme song for Atresmedia's coverage of the 2015–16 UEFA Champions League.

As a songwriter for other artists, in 2015, Barei co-wrote the song "La última superviviente" for Edurne, a track included in Edurne's sixth studio album Adrenalina, as well as the song "Encadenada a ti" for Malú, a track included in Malú's tenth studio album Caos and its second single.

=== 2016: Eurovision Song Contest 2016 ===
On 29 December 2015, the Spanish broadcaster Radiotelevisión Española (RTVE), announced Barei as one of the six candidates in the Spanish national selection, Objetivo Eurovisión, for the Eurovision Song Contest 2016. On 19 January 2016, samples of the six songs were released by RTVE, with Barei singing "Say Yay!" written by herself, Rubén Villanueva, and Víctor Púa Vivó. On 1 February, Barei won the Spanish national selection with 114 points, and represented Spain in the Eurovision Song Contest 2016 held in Stockholm, Sweden in May. In the final she placed 22nd.

Following her win on Objetivo Eurovisión, Barei was signed to Universal Music Spain. On 22 April 2016, a re-issue of her 2015 album Throw the Dice was released, including three new tracks: "Say Yay!" and previously unpublished songs "Who Plays the Drums" and "Super Ranger".

=== 2017–present: After Eurovision ===
On 3 March 2017, after ending her relationship with Universal Music, Barei released the standalone single "I Don't Need to Be You", a song against bullying. An accompanying music video being released on 3 March 2017 went on to successfully gain over 1.4 million views on YouTube.

Barei released three new singles on three consecutive weeks on 23 June, 30 June and 7 July 2017, "Wasn't Me", "Forget It" and "Worry, Worry" respectively, the latter a collaboration with rapper Porta. The former single preceded and was included on Barei's third studio album, You Number One, released on 4 May 2014. The same-titled single was released on 20 April 2018.

=== Personal life ===
Reyzábal gave birth to a girl and a boy, named India and León respectively, on 26 December 2018.

== Discography ==
=== Studio albums ===
Title	Details	Peak chart positions
Title	Details	SPA
Billete para no volver	Released: 5 April 2011; Formats: Digital download, CD; Label: Barei Music	—
Throw the Dice	Released: 7 April 2015; Formats: Digital download, CD; Label: Barei Music	—
Throw the Dice (reissue)	Released: 22 April 2016; Formats: Digital download, CD; Label: Universal Music Spain	28
You Number One	Released: 4 May 2018; Formats: Digital download; Label: Barei Music	—
"—" denotes an album that did not chart or was not released.

=== Singles ===
==== As lead artist ====
Title	Year	Peak chart positions			Certifications	Album
Title	Year	SPA	FRA	SWE	Certifications	Album
"Play"	2012	—	—	—		Non-album single
"Another's Life"	2013	—	—	—		Throw the Dice
"Foolish NaNa"	2013	—	—	—		Throw the Dice
"Wildest Horses"	2014	36	—	—		Throw the Dice
"You Fill Me Up (My Yang)"	2014	—	—	—		Throw the Dice
"Time to Fight"	2015	—	—	—		Non-album singles
"Get Up and Go"	2015	—	—	—		Non-album singles
"Say Yay!"	2016	36	184	63	PROMUSICAE: Gold	Throw the Dice (reissue)
"I Don't Need to Be You"	2017	11	—	—		You Number One
"Wasn't Me"	2017	32	—	—		Non-album singles
"Forget It"	2017	19	—	—		Non-album singles
"Worry, Worry" (featuring Porta)	2017	34	—	—		You Number One
"You Number One"	2018	—	—	—		You Number One
"Bitter Cold"	2018	—	—	—		You Number One
"Cuéntame qué te pasa"	2024	—	—	—		Non-album single
"—" denotes a single that did not chart or was not released.

==== As featured artist ====
Title	Year	Peak chart positions	Album
Title	Year	SPA	Album
"Impulso" (B-Fighters featuring Barei)	2017	—	—N/a
"Las chicas buenas" (Chenoa featuring Barei)	2019	—	—N/a

Preceded by Edurne with "Amanecer"	Spain in the Eurovision Song Contest; 2016	Succeeded by Manel Navarro with "Do It for Your Lover"
