= Worry, Worry (song) =

Single by Barei featuring Porta
- Released: 7 July 2017
- Recorded: 2016
- Genre: Pop
- Length: 3:25
- Label: Barei Music

Barei singles chronology
"Forget It" (2017)	"Worry, Worry" (2017)	"Impulso" (2017)

"Worry, Worry" is a song performed by Spanish singer/songwriter Barei, featuring vocals from Spanish rapper Porta. The song was released in Spain as a digital download on 7 July 2017. The song peaked at number 34 on the Spanish Singles Chart.

== Background ==
On 19 June 2017, Barei announced on Twitter that she was bringing out three new songs with different themes. "Worry, Worry" was released in Spain as a digital download on 7 July 2017. It was the third of three song to be released by Barei week-on-week after "Wasn't Me" was released on 23 June 2017 and "Forget It" was released on 7 July 2017.

== Lyric video ==
A lyric video to accompany the release of "Worry, Worry" was first released onto YouTube on 7 July 2017 at a total length of three minutes and twenty-four seconds.

== Track listing ==
Digital download
No.	Title	Length
1.	"Worry, Worry" (featuring Porta)	3:45

== Charts ==
Chart (2017)	Peak position
Spain (PROMUSICAE)	34

== Release history ==
Region	Date	Format	Label
Spain	7 July 2017	Digital download	Barei Music
