= Antonina Matviyenko =

Ukrainian singer (born 1981)

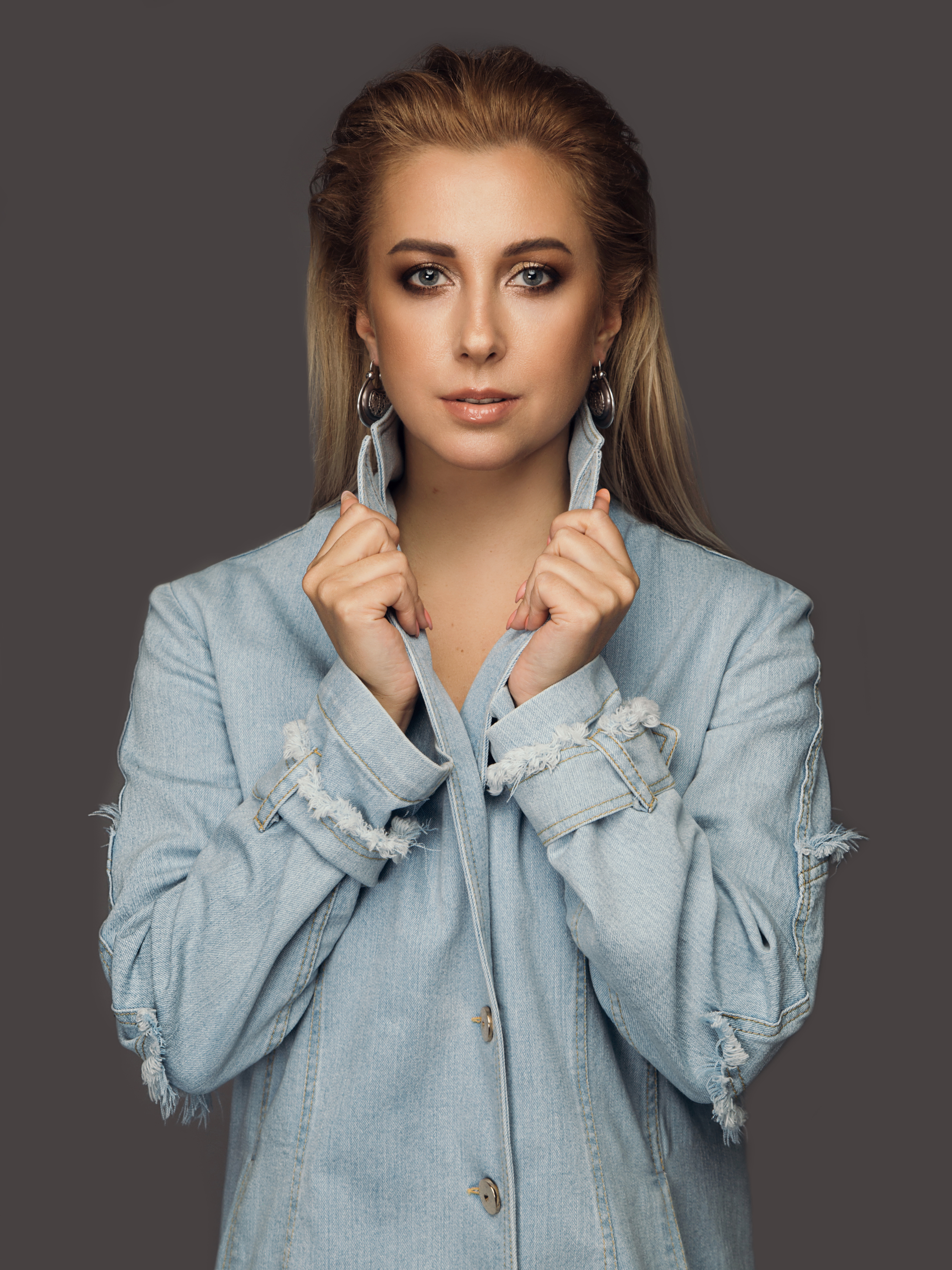

Background information
- Born: 12 April 1981 (age 44); Kyiv, Ukraine
- Genres: Folk, pop
- Occupations: Singer

Antonina Matviyenko (Ukrainian: Антоніна Матвієнко) is a Ukrainian singer. She is known for her timbre of voice and manner of singing.

== Biography ==
Antonina was born on 12 April 1981 in Kyiv, Ukraine. Nina Matviyenko, her mother, who is also a musician and a People's Artist of Ukraine, had a big musical influence on Antonina. In 1991, when Antonina was just ten years old, she went with her mother on a tour of the United States – those were the first performances of her life. In 2010 Antonina completed her studies at the Kyiv University of National Culture and Art and earned two master's degrees in PR Management and in Folk Singing.

At first Antonina was working in an art gallery, and then in an advertising agency. In 2002 she received The Diploma for the "National Competition of Pop Singing". In 2006 Antonina became a soloist of chamber orchestra "Kyiv Kamerata", where her mother used to perform. After the first audition an artistic director of the ensemble joked: "Matviyenko (Nina) was dismissed – Antonina was accepted". In 2007, she had her first song. In 2011, she took part in the first season of show Holos Krayiny (The Voice of the Country) and reached second place. Matviyenko has about twenty songs in her repertoire.
