= Amanecer (song) =

2015 song by Edurne

Single by Edurne

from the album Adrenalina
- Language: Spanish
- Released: 1 March 2015
- Recorded: 2014–2015
- Genre: Ethnopop
- Length: 3:04
- Label: Sony Music Spain
- Composer(s): Tony Sánchez-Ohlsson; Peter Boström; Thomas G:son
- Lyricist(s): Tony Sánchez-Ohlsson
- Producer(s): Tony Sánchez-Ohlsson

Edurne singles chronology
"Painkiller" (2014)	"Amanecer" (2015)	"Basta" (2015)

Music video
- "Amanecer" on YouTube

Eurovision Song Contest 2015 entry
- Country: Spain
- Artist(s): Edurne
- Language: Spanish
- Composer(s): Tony Sánchez-Ohlsson; Peter Boström; Thomas G:son
- Lyricist(s): Tony Sánchez-Ohlsson

Finals performance
- Final result: 21st
- Final points: 15

Entry chronology
- ◄ "Dancing in the Rain" (2014)
- "Say Yay!" (2016) ►

Official performance video
- "Amanecer" (final) on YouTube

"Amanecer" (Spanish pronunciation: [amane'θeɾ], "Dawn") is a song recorded by Spanish singer Edurne, with music by Tony Sánchez-Ohlsson, Peter Boström, and Thomas G:son, and lyrics by Sánchez-Ohlsson. It premiered on 1 March 2015, and it was released as a single on digital platforms on 2 March 2015 as the lead single of her sixth studio album, Adrenalina. It represented Spain in the Eurovision Song Contest 2015, placing twenty-first. It was also the official song of the 2015 Vuelta a España.

== Background ==
=== Conception ===
"Amanecer" was composed by Spanish songwriter Tony Sánchez-Ohlsson and Swedish Peter Boström and Thomas G:son, with lyrics by Sánchez-Ohlsson. It was described as "a midtempo with a certain degree of drama and ethnic character". It was presented to Edurne in October 2014 during the selection of songs for her sixth studio album Adrenalina.

=== Selection ===
In November 2014, Edurne and her record label Sony Music Spain decided to place a bid to Radiotelevisión Española (RTVE) to represent Spain in the 60th edition of the Eurovision Song Contest. On 14 January 2015, RTVE announced that they had internally selected "Amanecer" by Edurne as their entrant.

=== Recording and release ===
The single was produced between Spain and Sweden. The string section of the RTVE Symphony Orchestra, under the direction of Pepe Herrero, recorded the string arrangements for the track. The song premiered on 1 March 2015, and it was released as a single on digital platforms on 2 March 2015.

On 3 March 2015, Edurne, the RTVE Symphony Orchestra and Choir, once again under the direction of Pepe Herrero, recorded the symphonic version of the song at the Teatro Monumental in Madrid.

Edurne performed the song live for the first time on late night talk show Alaska y Segura, aired on La 1 of Televisión Española on 6 April 2015. On 11 April 2015, she performed the song live on La 1's variety show La Alfombra Roja Palace.

=== Music video ===
The official video of the song premiered on 9 March 2015. It was filmed in studio in Valencia in January 2015, directed by David Arnal and Germán de la Hoz, and features visual effects by Virtual Art. Edurne is accompanied in the video by model Saoro Nadal.

=== Eurovision ===
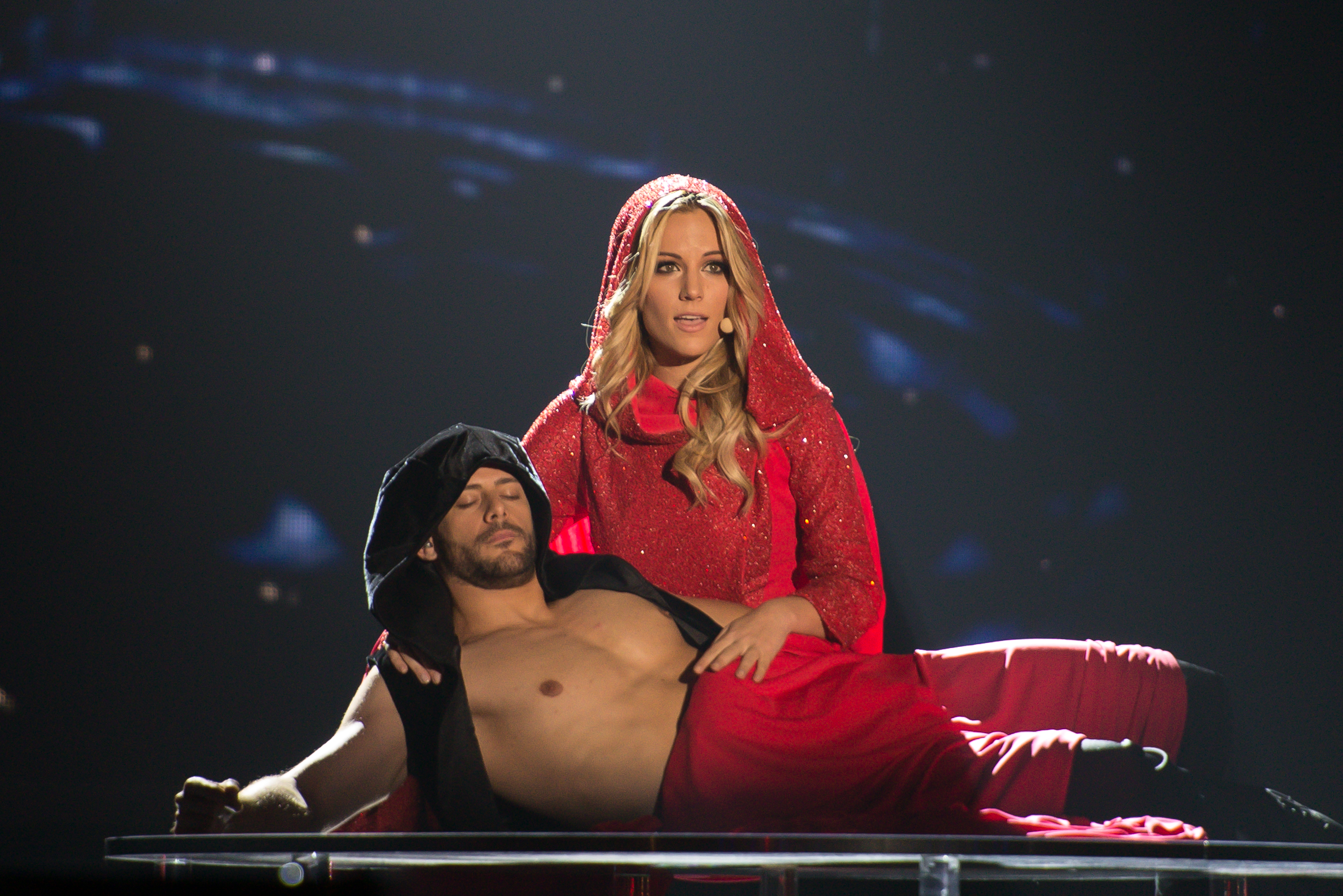
Edurne performing "Amanecer" in Eurovision, along Di Bella.

On 23 May 2015, the grand final of the Eurovision Song Contest was held in the Wiener Stadthalle in Vienna hosted by Österreichischer Rundfunk (ORF) and broadcast live throughout the continent. Edurne performed "Amanecer" twenty-first on the night, following Romania's "De la capăt" by Voltaj and preceding Hungary's "Wars for Nothing" by Boggie. She was accompanied on stage by Italian dancer Giuseppe Di Bella.

At the close of voting, it had received 15 points, placing twenty-first in a field of twenty-seven.

=== Aftermath ===
The song was the lead single of Edurne's sixth studio album, Adrenalina released on 16 June 2015. She performed the song in her concert tour throughout Spain promoting the album between 18 July 2015 and 16 September 2016. "Amanecer" was also the official song of the 2015 Vuelta a España held on 22 August–13 September.

== Track listing ==
Digital download
No.	Title	Length
1.	"Amanecer"	3:04

Digital download - Brian Cross Remix
No.	Title	Length
1.	"Amanecer (Brian Cross Remix)"	3:02

Digital download - Break Of Day Remixes
No.	Title	Length
1.	"Break Of Day"	3:02
2.	"Break Of Day (Brian Cross Remix)"	3:02
3.	"Break Of Day (Apollo Vice Remix)"	4:17

== Release history ==
Country	Date	Format	Label
Spain	1 March 2015		Sony Music Spain
Spain	2 March 2015	Digital download, streaming	Sony Music Spain
Spain	4 May 2015	Digital download - Brian Cross Remix	Sony Music Spain
Spain	25 May 2015	Digital download - Break Of Day Remixes	Sony Music Spain

== Chart performance ==
=== Weekly charts ===
Chart (2015)	Peak position
Belgium (Ultratop 50 Flanders)	58
Spain (PROMUSICAE)	20
