= Alina Pash =

Ukrainian singer (born 1993)

Alina Pash Аліна Паш
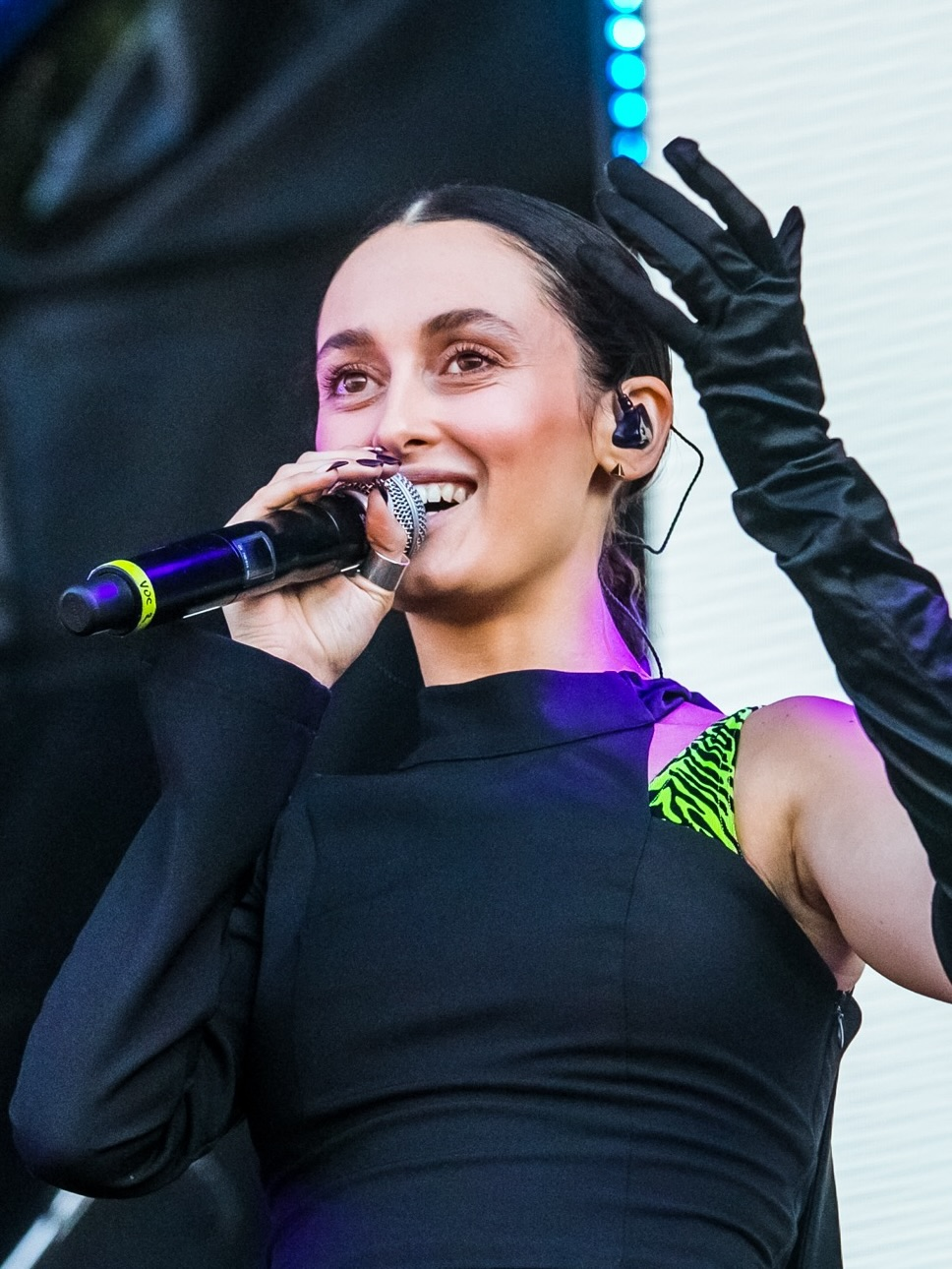
- Pash in 2019

Background information
- Born: 6 May 1993 (age 33); Bushtyno, Zakarpattia Oblast, Ukraine
- Origin: Kyiv, Ukraine
- Genres: Pop; electro; hip hop; shamanic
- Occupations: Singer; songwriter; rapper; actress
- Years active: 2018–present

Alina Ivanivna Pash (Ukrainian: Аліна Іванівна Паш, pronounced [ɐˈl⁽ʲ⁾inɐ ˈpɑʃ]; born 6 May 1993) is a Ukrainian singer, rapper and songwriter.

In 2016, Pash participated in the sixth season of the Ukrainian edition of The X Factor, placing 3rd. In 2018, she released the single "Bitanga", thanks to which she became popular in Ukraine. In 2019, Alina was included in the Ukrainian Forbes "30 to 30" list as a young opinion leader and won the Ukrainian Elle Style Award as one of the most stylish and successful Ukrainian women. Also in 2019, Pash performed at the grand show celebrating Ukrainian Independence Day, where she rapped a variation on the national anthem of Ukraine in front of President Volodymyr Zelenskyy and thousands of others. She also participated in Ukrainian national selection for Eurovision 2022 and won the selection beating eventual Eurovision winners Kalush Orchestra.

== Early life ==
Alina was born on May 6, 1993 in the village of Bushtyno, Zakarpattia Oblast. Raised in the family of a music teacher and a policeman, Pash started singing in early childhood and performed in front of an audience for the first time when she was six. At the age of 13, every weekend she had to travel alone to Uzhgorod, a western Ukrainian city some 120 kilometers from her home, for vocal classes. As a child, she first dreamed of becoming an archeologist and later wanted to be a police officer, like her father did.

Alina moved to Kyiv in 2011 and entered the Academy of Circus and Variety Arts. At the time, Pash had a number of jobs connected to the music industry: she worked with DJs, Ukrainian bands and was a backing vocalist for the singer Iryna Bilyk and the band Skai.

== Career ==
=== 2018-2019 ===
On April 15, 2018, Alina Pash presented her debut single "Bitanga" and a video clip for it. The song combines hip-hop, pop elements and ethnic motifs. The video was recorded with the participation of French rapper Jaw from the group "dOP", whose voice sounds at the end. Pash says her phone died 30 minutes after she posted the video, as there were so many calls from people congratulating her. “Bitanga” was praised by Ukraine’s music-focused media.

In August, Pash became the face of the clothing collection of designer Lilia Litkovska.

On September 18, Alina Pash released her second single called "Oinagori" with a music video. The music video was shot in Marseille (France) with a local team, directed by Lou Escobar and Nathan Daisy.

In January 2019, Alina Pash performed at the World Economic Forum in Davos, Switzerland.

On May 24, 2019, a new album "Pintea: Gory" was released, recorded in an ethnic style. On June 14, the world saw the second part of the album called "Pintea: Misto", recorded in electronic and hip-hop style. As the singer herself noted, she dedicated the first part of the album to her native Carpathian village, and the second — to Kyiv.

In July, Alina performed at the Atlas Weekend festival.

On Independence Day of Ukraine, August 24, 2019, at the "Walk of Dignity" on Maidan Nezalezhnosti in Kyiv, Alina Pash rapped a variation on the national anthem of Ukraine.

=== 2020-2022 ===
In the summer of 2020, Alina Pash was supposed to perform at the Sónar electronic music festival in Barcelona, but the festival was canceled due to the coronavirus pandemic.

On September 11, 2020, an ironic and sharply social EP called "Amerikraine Dream" is released. The song "Accent" was recorded with French producer and musician Brodinski.

In 2020, Alina took part in the social project "Rizni.Rivni" (what is translated from Ukrainian as "Different. Equal"), in which a manifesto song was recorded in support of tolerance in Ukrainian society.

In March 2021, Alina Pash signed a contract with UTA. In the spring of 2021, an album "розМова" (translates as "Conversation") is released that was created during field expeditions to the Hutsul region in the Carpathian Mountains, which Alina Pash and her team went to in 2020. The album includes the song "Ballad" and "Water" recorded live from one take, which was recorded in the church where Sergei Parajanov once shot "Shadows of forgotten ancestors". Later in 2022, Electronic Arts chose the song "Voin" from this album as one of the soundtracks for the game Need For Speed Unbounded.

In October 2021, Alina Pash presented a joint song "Witch" with Canadian musician Apashe. The video for the song was shot in Ukraine and Canada.

In December 2021, EP "Norov" was released, where ethnicity is woven into the beats and atmosphere of R&B. EP was recorded with DJ and sound producer Pahatam (Evgeny Yaremenko). "Norov" included 4 songs, among them the previously presented "Motanka", which was included in the advertising of PUMA sneakers.

In January 2022, Alina Pash won MME Awards 2022. Later in 2023, Alina hosted the MME Awards 2023.

=== 2022: Eurovision ===
Pash entered Vidbir 2022 with the song "Shadows of Forgotten Ancestors". She won the competition, thus gaining the right to represent Ukraine at the Eurovision Song Contest 2022. However, after the competition, the Ukrainian broadcaster UA:PBC began investigating a trip Pash had taken to Crimea in 2015, under the suspicion that Pash had broken the law by not travelling there through Ukraine. To that, Pash says she has never had a concert in Russia but had had to travel there for personal matters before she became a public figure in Ukraine. Following this investigation, it was decided via a mutual agreement between the broadcaster, Vidbir's organising committee and Pash that her participation in the contest would not go ahead. Kalush Orchestra, who placed second in Vidbir 2022, were later selected to represent Ukraine at Eurovision with the song "Stefania".

=== 2022 - present ===
After the start of Russia's full-scale invasion of Ukraine, Alina Pash actively participates in public activities and gives charity concerts both in Ukraine and in Europe. On July 8, the single "Heaven" was released with a video clip dedicated to children who died during the war. The song was written immediately after the bombing of a maternity hospital in Mariupol in early March. Displaced persons from Ukraine, in particular a family who escaped from the occupation in the Kherson region, took part in the filming of the video clip.

On August 15, Alina Pash gave a political audio-visual performance at one of the largest European festivals Sziget. The entire performance was focused around the war in Ukraine.

In the summer of 2022, Alina Pash performed at Burning Man, which takes place in Nevada, USA.

In the spring of 2023 Alina Pash released a maxi single "Gorgany", which is dedicated to the secrets and riddles of the Carpathians. The collection consists of three songs: "Karpatska", "Chukutykha" and "Goira". After this, Alina Pash went on the European charity tour "Listen". Concerts were held in Germany, Belgium, Austria, Hungary and the Czech Republic. In the summer of 2023, Alina Pash performed at a series of European festivals, including Lollapalooza in Berlin, Pohoda Festival in Slovakia, Orange festival in Poland and others.

On February 16, 2024, a witch's EP called "Esbat" was released. The songs "Sabbath" (the song was created and produced by Alina and French music producer Nardey and Polish music producer Leon Krześniak) and "Wonder" (created with French artists Past Life Romeo and FELOWER) were recorded during the musical camp CNM in Paris.

On May 10, common EP by Alina Pash and musician Zbaraski was released under the title "Nikoly. S4e raz" (in English "Never. Again"), which was mostly recorded in 2020.

== Discography ==
Albums:

- Pintea: Gory (2019)
- Pintea: Misto (2019)
- rozMova (2021)

EPs:

- Amerikraine Dream (2020)
- Norov (2021)
- Esbat (2024)

Collaborative album:

- Nikoly. S4e raz (2024)

Singles:

- Bitanga (2018)
- Oinagori (2018)
- Oboloka (2019)
- N.U.M. (2020)
- Molytva (2021)
- Motanka (2021)
- Shadows of Forgotten Ancestors (2022)
- Heaven (2022)
- Karpatska (2023)
- Chukutykha (2023)
- Goira (2023)
- Ne_novenka (2024)
- Sklo (2024)

== Music videos ==
Year	Title	Director	feat (if any)	Album / EP (if any)
2018	Bitanga	Gena Trunov		"Pintea: Gory"
2018	Oinagori	Nathan Daisy		"Pintea: Misto"
2019	Padlo	Nathan Daisy	Alyona Alyona	"Pushka"
2019	Good Evening x Egogra	Nathan Daisy		"Pintea: Misto"
2019	"Persha ledi" / "Перша леді"	Tonia Noiabrova	Pianoboy	"Khistori"
2019	"Ne pyly" / "Не пили»	Oleksii Sai	Freel	
2019	"Bosorkanya"	Nathan Daisy		"Pintea: Gory"
2019	"Pintea"	James Fisher		"Pintea: Gory"
2020	"N.U.M."	PicoiProduction		"Amerikraine Dream"
2020	"Vysokomirni"	Arthur Talabira	XXV kadr	"Amerikraine Dream"
2020	"Corruption"	Alina Pash, Maria Korostelova	Otoy, Den Da Funk, DJ Pone	
2020	"Dengi"	Stas Gurenko		"Amerikraine Dream"
2021	"Molytva x Kolyskova" / "Молитва х Колискова"	Michael Zvegintsev		"розМова"
2021	"Ocean"	Nathan Daisy		"Pintea: Misto"
2021	"Witch"	Adrian Villagomez	Apashe	"I Killed The Orchestra"
2022	"Heaven"	Sasha Prilutsky		
2022	"Shadows of Forgotten Ancestors"	Matt Evans		
2022	"Viryty" / " Вірити"	Yura Katynsky		
2024	"Ne_novenka"	Asya Nikolaeva		"Esbat"

== Collaborations ==
Year	Title	With	Album
2018	"Robot" / "Робот"	TNMK	7
2019	"Padlo" / "Падло"	Alyona Alyona	Pushka
2019	"Persha ledi" / "Перша леді"	Pianoboy	Khistori
2020	"Ok"	Rashid Ajami	Ok
2020	"Yellow Sands"	Tvorchi	13 Waves
2021	"Dotyky" / "Дотики"	Tina Karol	Moloda Krov
2021	"Witch"	Apashe	I Killed The Orchestra
2021	"Liberation"	Pymin	Ultrashell
2022	"Za odnym stolom" / "За одним столом"	Monatik	
2024	"High Key"	Unklevon	UN1C
2026	"Everest"	What So Not	Everest

== Awards and nominations ==
2026

- Berlin Music Video Awards
  - Nominated Best Concept for the song "Kyiv".

2025

- Berlin Music Video Awards
  - Nominated Best Director for the song "Bad Witch"

2022

- Music Moves Europe Award
  - 2022 MME Award

2020

- YUNA
  - Best Duet (with alyona alyona for "Падло")
  - Best Hip-Hop Hit

2019

- YUNA
  - Best Hip-Hop Hit
- Elle Style Award (Ukraine)
  - Singer of the Year
- Jäger Music Awards
  - Hip-Hop Artist of the Year

2018

- Jäger Music Awards
  - Single of the Year
  - Video of the Year
