= Shadows of Forgotten Ancestors (song) =

2022 single by Alina Pash

"Tini zabutykh predkiv"

Single by Alina Pash
- Language: Ukrainian; English
- English title: "Shadows of Forgotten Ancestors"
- Released: 4 February 2022
- Length: 2:53
- Label: Bitanga Blood
- Songwriters: Alina Pash; Taras Bazeev

"Tini zabutykh predkiv" (Ukrainian: «Тіні забутих предків», pronounced [ˈt⁽ʲ⁾in⁽ʲ⁾i zɐˈbutɪx ˈprɛdkiu̯]), better known in English as "Shadows of Forgotten Ancestors", is a song by Ukrainian singer Alina Pash. The song was scheduled to represent Ukraine at the Eurovision Song Contest 2022, after winning Vidbir 2022, Ukraine's national final. However, following controversy surrounding Pash's status as a legitimate participant of Vidbir, she ultimately withdrew. The replacement entry, "Stefania" by Kalush Orchestra, ultimately went on to win the contest.

== Background ==
The song shares the name of a 1965 movie, Shadows of Forgotten Ancestors. The music video features artwork of the characters, along with Ukrainian writers Lesya Ukrainka and Iryna Vilde.

The first verse talks about the history of Ukraine, featuring a long history of war that plagued the country. Ancient Slavic gods Perun and Dazhbog heard cries of the Ukrainian people, peace was eventually brought to the country. With peace, new communities would form and rise. The chorus brings a message of unity to the people in Ukraine. The song then compares Ukraine's past to Dante's Divine Comedy, saying that Dante could have instead written a Divine Tragedy. The song ends with a message that says that peace is the only way out, and that Ukrainians can create a better future for themselves instead of being dependent on the tragedies of the past.

== Vidbir 2022 ==
"Tini zabutykh predkiv" was an entry in Vidbir 2022, a televised music competition used to determine Ukraine's entrant for the Eurovision Song Contest 2022. The selection of the competing entries for Vidbir took place over three stages. In the first stage, artists and songwriters had the opportunity to apply for the competition through an online submission form. Twenty-seven acts were longlisted and announced on 17 January 2022. The second stage was a scheduled audition at designated dates and featured the twenty-seven acts in the longlist. Eight acts were selected to advance, which were announced on 24 January 2022. The third stage was the final, which took place on 12 February 2022 and featured the eight acts vying to represent Ukraine in Turin. The winner was selected via the 50/50 combination of votes from a public televote and a three-member expert jury, consisting of 2006 and 2016 Ukrainian entrants Tina Karol and Jamala, alongside Suspilne board member Yaroslav Lodyhin.

Artists and composers had the opportunity to submit their entries between 14 December 2021 and 10 January 2022. Only artists that had not performed in a concert in Russia since 2014 and entered the territory of Crimea were able to apply for the competition. A selection panel including the music producer of the show Mykhailo Koshevy and the television producer of the show Oleksiy Honcharenko reviewed the 284 received submissions, and twenty-seven entries that had been longlisted were announced on 17 January 2022. Auditions were later held at the My Dream Space venue in Kyiv where eight entries were shortlisted to compete in the national final. On 24 January 2022, the eight selected competing acts were announced. On the final, held on 12 February 2022, Pash resulted as the winner, but she ultimately declined her position after being involved in a controversy for having breached the rule barring Vidbir competitors from having traveled to Russia or Crimea. The document of proof of how she entered the region via Ukrainian territory was according to the UA:PBC a falsified certificate. On 16 February 2022 UA:PBC, stated it had decided to "cease her participation" and that "the artist agreed with this decision of the organizing committee".

== Release history ==
Release dates and formats for "Tini zabutykh predkiv"
| Region | Date | Format | Label | Ref. |
|---|---|---|---|---|
| Various | 4 February 2022 | Digital download; streaming | Bitanga Blood | |
| Russia | 4 February 2022 | Contemporary hit radio | Bitanga Blood | |
