= Oleh Psiuk =

Ukrainian rapper and songwriter (born 1994)

Oleh Psiuk Олег Псюк
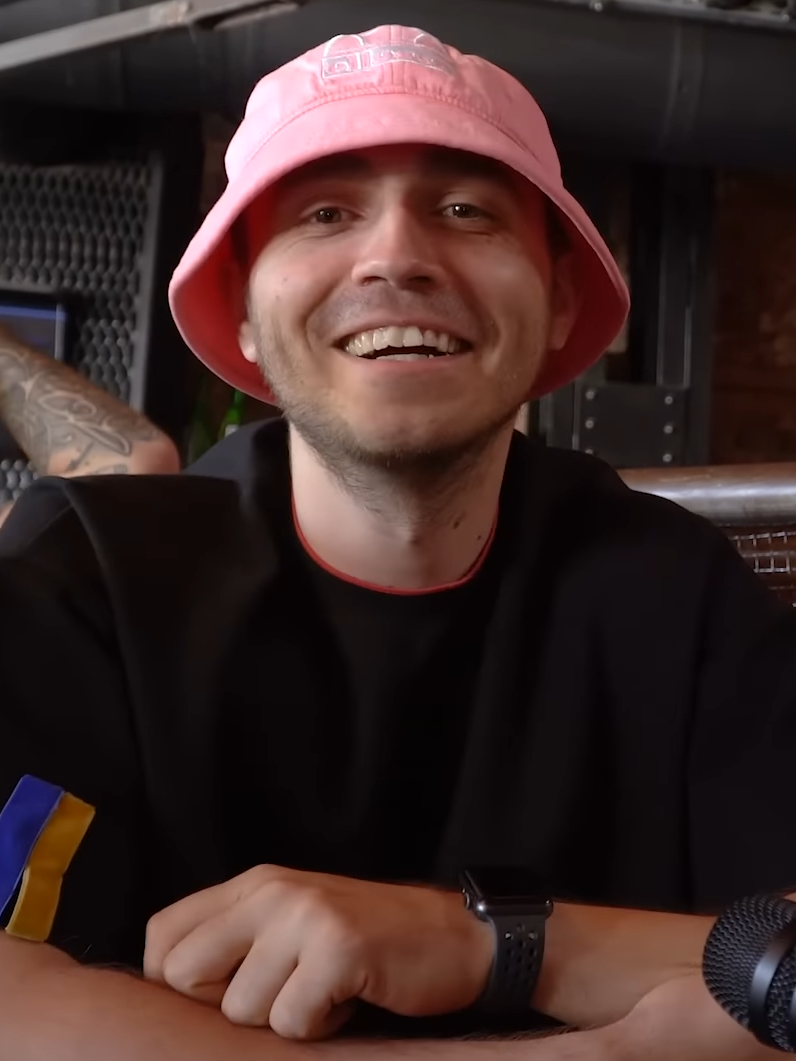
- Psiuk in 2022

Background information
- Also known as: Psiuchyi Syn
- Born: Oleh Romanovych Psiuk; 16 May 1994 (age 32); Kalush, Ukraine
- Genre: Hip hop
- Occupations: Rapper; songwriter
- Years active: 2014–present

Oleh Romanovych Psiuk (Ukrainian: Олег Романович Псюк; born 16 May 1994), also known by his stage name Psiuchyi Syn (Псючий Син – a portmanteau of his family name and suchyi syn, lit. 'son of a bitch'), is a Ukrainian rapper and songwriter, who is the founder and frontman of the rap group Kalush.

== Early life and education ==
Psiuk was born on 16 May 1994 in Kalush, Ivano-Frankivsk Oblast as the son of a shop assistant and a mechanical engineer. He attended Kalush Polytechnic College, where he was trained as a maintenance technician. In 2013, he moved to Lviv to study at the Department of Automation and Computer-Integrated Technologies of the Ukrainian National Forestry University.

== Career ==
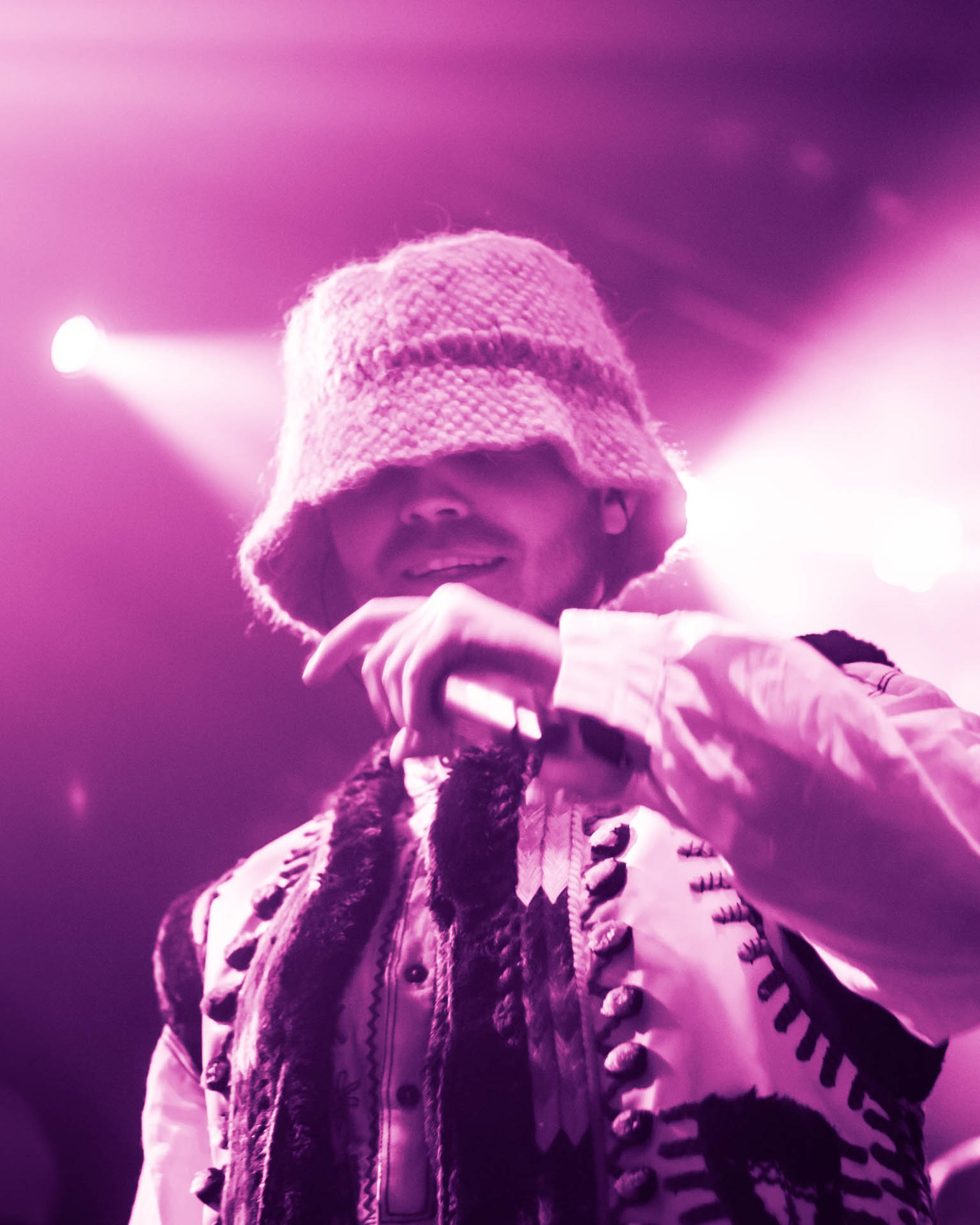
Psiuk performing in Gdańsk, Poland in 2022

=== 2014–2018: Solo career ===
Psiuk began a professional career in rapping with the help of rapper Nashiem Worryk, with whom he first collaborated in 2014. In 2016, he released his debut single "Khvyli" together with Worryk. His debut studio album, titled Torba, was released in 2018. In his tracks, the hardships of life in the countryside of Western Ukraine are an important theme.

=== 2019–present: Kalush and Kalush Orchestra ===
In mid-2019, Psiuk announced on Facebook that he was looking for hip hop musicians to establish a rap group with. Soon after, he formed the rap group Kalush together with Ihor Didenchuk and the anonymous MC KylymMen. The group was named after Psiuk's hometown. As part of Kalush, Psiuk has released two studio albums and over twenty singles. In 2021, the group launched the side project Kalush Orchestra, which blends hip hop with folk motifs and elements from Ukrainian traditional music.

On 12 February 2022, Kalush Orchestra competed to represent Ukraine in the Eurovision Song Contest 2022 in Turin, Italy with the song "Stefania". In the final of the national selection Vidbir, they took second place with 14 points (six from the jury and eight from the audience). Despite coming in second place, the group was offered the chance to represent Ukraine in the Eurovision Song Contest after the winner had withdrawn her candidacy. On 22 February, Kalush Orchestra accepted the offer.

The group won the Eurovision final on 14 May with 631 points, securing Ukraine's third Eurovision victory. "Stefania" became the first song with rap lyrics to win the contest, as well as the winning song with the highest number of televote points in the history of the contest.

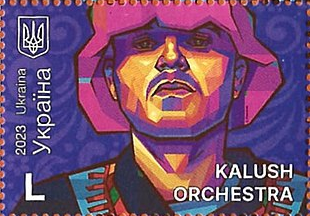
Psiuk depicted on a 2023 Ukrainian postage stamp

== Artistry ==
During performances, Psiuk always wears a pink bucket hat. He has cited Eminem as one of his main artistic influences.

== Discography ==
=== Albums ===
Title	Details
Torba	Released: 18 September 2018; Format: streaming, digital download

=== Singles ===
==== As lead artist ====
Title	Year
"Khvyli" (with Nashiem Worryk)	2016
"Vybyrai ton #2"	2018
"Almanakh"	2018
"All In"	2018
"Peredoz druh"	2019

==== As featured artist ====
Title	Year
"Enerhetyk" (NEformat feat. Psiuchyi Syn)	2018
