= Kalush (rap group) =

Ukrainian rap group

- Origin: Kalush, Ukraine
- Genre: Hip hop
- Years active: 2019–present
- Label: Universal Music Group
- Spinoffs: Kalush Orchestra
- Members: Oleh Psiuk; MC Kylymmen
- Past members: Ihor Didenchuk

Kalush (Ukrainian: Калуш, romanized: [ˈkɑlʊʃ]; stylised in all caps) is a Ukrainian rap group founded in 2019 by rapper Oleh Psiuk and music producer Ivan "Vanyok" Klymenko. In early 2021, the group launched the side project Kalush Orchestra. Unlike the original line-up, Kalush Orchestra focuses on hip hop blended with folk motifs and elements from Ukrainian traditional music. On 15 May 2022, Kalush Orchestra won the Eurovision Song Contest 2022 with the song "Stefania".

== History ==
Kalush was formed in 2019 through the collaborative efforts of rapper Oleh Psiuk, also known as Psiuchyi Syn, and music producer Ivan "Vanyok" Klymenko. The band's name was inspired by Oleh's stories about his hometown of Kalush, which led to the choice. Oleh found multi-instrumentalist Ihor Didenchuk online after responding to his call on Facebook, among 20 sopilka players, and chose Ihor. The third member of the group was the mysterious MC Kylymmen (or "Carpetman"), a virtual person, behind whose mask can be any person. Since the creation of the group, more than 70 people have taken on the role of MC Kylymmen, and in each song, a new person appears behind the mask of MC Kylymmen.

The group’s first music video for the song "Ne marynui" was released on their official YouTube channel on 17 October 2019. The video was filmed on the streets of the band’s hometown of Kalush. After releasing their second music video, "Ty honysh", in November 2019, Kalush signed a collaboration agreement with the American hip-hop label Def Jam, part of Universal Music Group. On 9 December the video for the song "Hory" was released, which the band performed together with Alyona Alyona. In 12 days, the video gained 1.2 million views on YouTube.

In 2021, according to TopHit, Kalush had 424,949 radio airplays on Ukrainian radio stations and garnered 37,318,425 views on YouTube.

In January 2021, Kalush, together with Skofka, released the joint track "Otaman". In May, another collaboration, "Dodomu", was released, which made it to the YouTube trends, Shazam charts, Spotify, and iTunes top charts. With this song, the artists decided to support the "Oko za Oko" project by the OKKO gas station network and the "Povernysʹ zhyvym" foundation. The project's goal was to raise funds for purchasing 25 Shark drone systems.

On 19 February 2021 the band released their debut album Hotin. On 23 July 2021, Kalush and Skofka released a joint mini-album "Yo-Yo" and a new track, "Ne naprygaysya". On 22 March 2024, Kalush and Kola released two songs, "Pamyatai" and "Upiimai moie sertse", along with their music videos. One of the videos was released on Kalush's YouTube channel, and the other on Kola's YouTube channel simultaneously.

On 14 June 2024, Kalush released their third album, Dlia dushi.

== Artistry ==
The leader and founder of the band Kalush, Oleh Psiuk, has long been known for wearing a pink bucket hat. The singer bought his first bucket hat at a second-hand store for the filming of the music video for the song "Ne marynui". Since then, the pink bucket hat has become not only Oleh Psiuk's trademark but also a symbol of the entire Kalush band, and later the Kalush Orchestra, which is a spinoff of the original project. It has also become a significant symbol, as it is actively sold at auctions worldwide, raising funds to support Ukraine during the Russo-Ukrainian War.

== Members ==
=== Current members ===
- Oleh Psiuk (2019–present) – rap
- MC Kylymmen (2022–present) – breakdance

=== Past members ===
- Ihor Didenchuk (2019–2023) – instrumentals

== Discography ==
=== Albums ===
Title	Details
Hotin	Released: 19 February 2021; Label: Columbia; Format: CD, LP, digital download
Yo-yo (feat. Skofka)	Released: 23 July 2021; Label: Columbia; Format: CD, LP, digital download

=== Singles ===
Title	Year
"Ne marynui"	2019
"Ty honysh"	2019
"Hory" (featuring Alyona Alyona)	2019
"Kent"	2020
"Tipok"	2020
"Virus"	2020
"Vibe"	2020
"Góry" (featuring Alyona Alyona, Gedz and Skip)	2020
"V trendi pafos"	2020
"BIMBO"	2020
"Takykh Yak Ya" (featuring Yarmak)	2020
"Zori"	2020
"Voda" (featuring Alyona Alyona)	2020
"Otaman"	2021
"Ne zabudu"	2021
"Pirnaiu" (featuring Stanislavska)	2021
"Khalepa" (featuring Yuyu)	2021
"Dodomu" (featuring Skofka)	2021
"Davai nachystotu" (featuring Skofka)	2021
"Ne napryhaysia" (featuring Skofka)	2021
"Faina" (featuring Skofka)	2021
"Mayakov" (featuring Skofka)	2021
"Ya ydu" (featuring Skofka)	2022
"Taksi" (featuring Khrystyna Soloviy)	2022
"Khvyli" (featuring Jerry Heil)	2022
"Mala v 19"	2022
"Kaluski vechornytsi" (featuring Tember Blanche)	2022
"Sonyachna" (featuring Salto Nazad and Skofka)	2022
"Maibutnist" (with Artem Pivovarov)	2022
"Patton" (featuring Mykola Vynar)	2022
"Batkivshchyna" (with Skofka)	2022
"Stiny" (with Jerry Heil)	2023
"Khmary" (featuring Leo Mantis)	2023
"To ye Lviv" (with Skryabin)	2023
"Desiatka" (featuring KRUTЬ)	2024
"Pamitai" (featuring KOLA)	2024
"Upiimai moie sertse" (featuring KOLA)	2024
"Doshch" (featuring GOLUBENKO)	2024
"Ostannii raz" (featuring ADAM and Balsam)	2024
"Rozbudy mene" (featuring Balsam)	2024
"Tebe ne popustyt"	2024
"Khtos znov" (featuring Agape)	2024
"Aromat volossiaznov" (featuring NAIMES)	2024
"Hrai muzykant" (featuring Balsam)	2024
"Chervona Nytka" (featuring Ann in Black)	2024

==== As featured artist ====
Title	Year
"Sterzhen (Own Core)" (Alyona Alyona featuring KALUSH, Otoy, Bilyi Bo, Shershen, Dyktor and Dyadya Vova)	2020
"Pozhovkla vesna" (Dima Varvaruk featuring KALUSH and Vláda)	2020
"Balabon" (Panini featuring KALUSH)	2021
"Peremoha" (Okean Elzy featuring KALUSH)	2021
"Nasze Domy" (Szpaku featuring KALUSH)	2022
"Riba" (Sal'to Nazad featuring KALUSH)	2026

=== Non-single album appearances ===
Title	Year
"You ze fa" (Sasha Tab feat. KALUSH)	2021
"Dobre pre" (Alyona Alyona feat. KALUSH and Kukon)	2021

== Awards and nominations ==
Award	Year	Category	Nominated work or act	Result	Ref.
YUNA	2021	Best Hip Hop Hit	"Hory" (feat. Alyona Alyona)	Won	
YUNA	2022	Best Pop Group	Kalush	Nominated	
YUNA	2022	Best Album	Hotin	Nominated	
YUNA	2022	Best Song	"Zori"	Nominated	
YUNA	2022	Best Hip Hop Hit	"Zori"	Nominated	
YUNA	2022	Best Hip Hop Hit	"Dodomu" (feat. Skofka)	Nominated	
YUNA	2022	Best Hip Hop Hit	"Taksi" (feat. Khrystyna Soloviy)	Nominated	
Top Hit Music Awards	2021	Breakthrough of the Year	Kalush	Won	
Top Hit Music Awards	2021	Best Band YouTube Ukraine	Kalush	Won	
Top Hit Music Awards	2021	YouTube Ukraine Breakthrough of the Year	Kalush	Won	
Jager Music Awards	2021	Track of the Year	"Zori"	Nominated	
TOP20UA from Rap.ua	2021	Track and Music Video "Zori"	"Zori"	Won	
YouTube Palyanytsia Awards	2021	Music Video of the Year	"Zori"	Won	
