= Pianoboy =

Ukrainian musical act

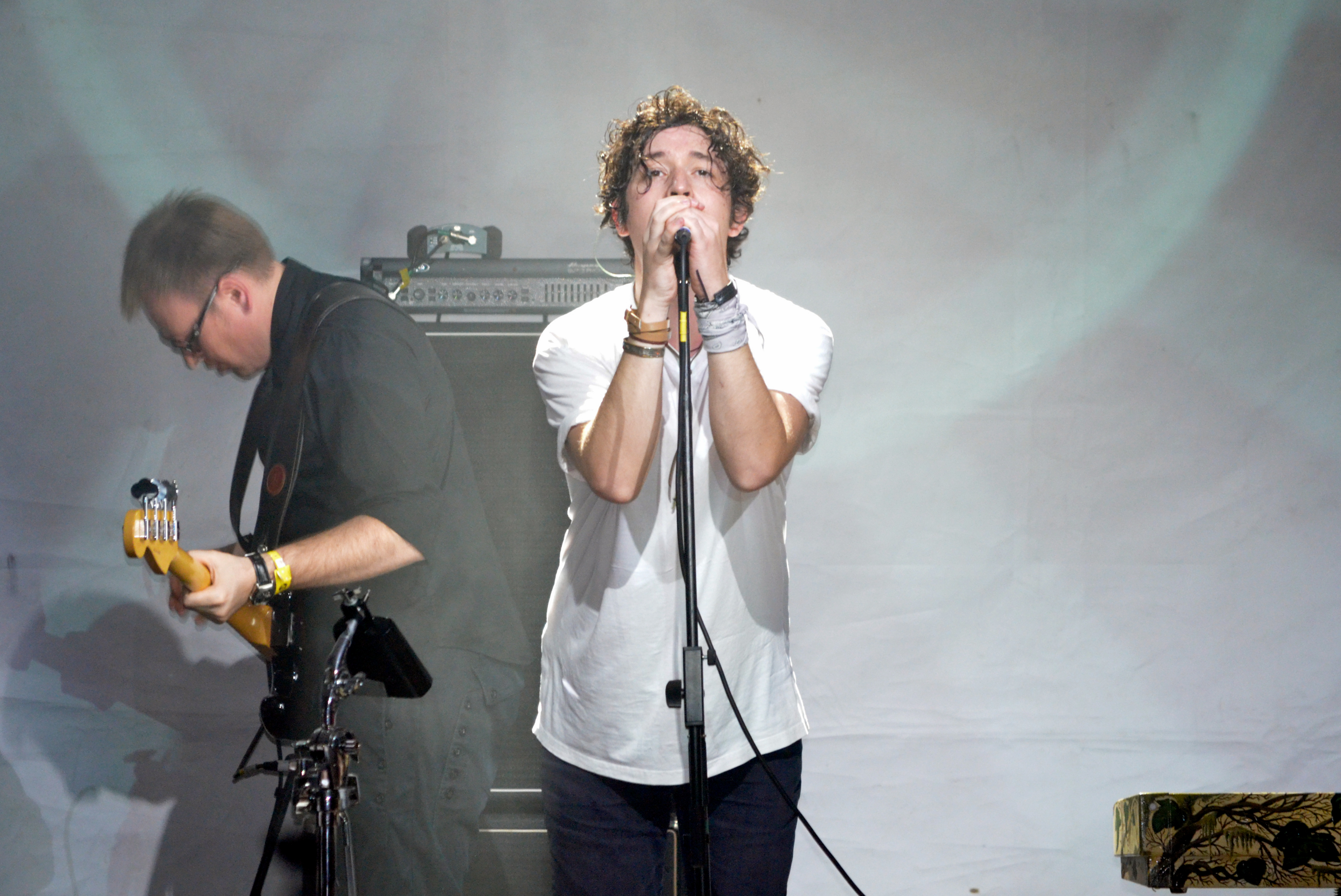
Pianoboy at the Green Theater (2014)

Pianoboy is the solo project of Ukrainian musician Dmytro Shurov (former keyboardist for Okean Elzy, Esthetic Education, and Zemfira) created in 2009 and performs songs in Ukrainian, Russian, and English. Dmitry's sister, Olga Shurova, a graduate of the Kyiv National Linguistic University, also takes part in the project.

== History of Project ==
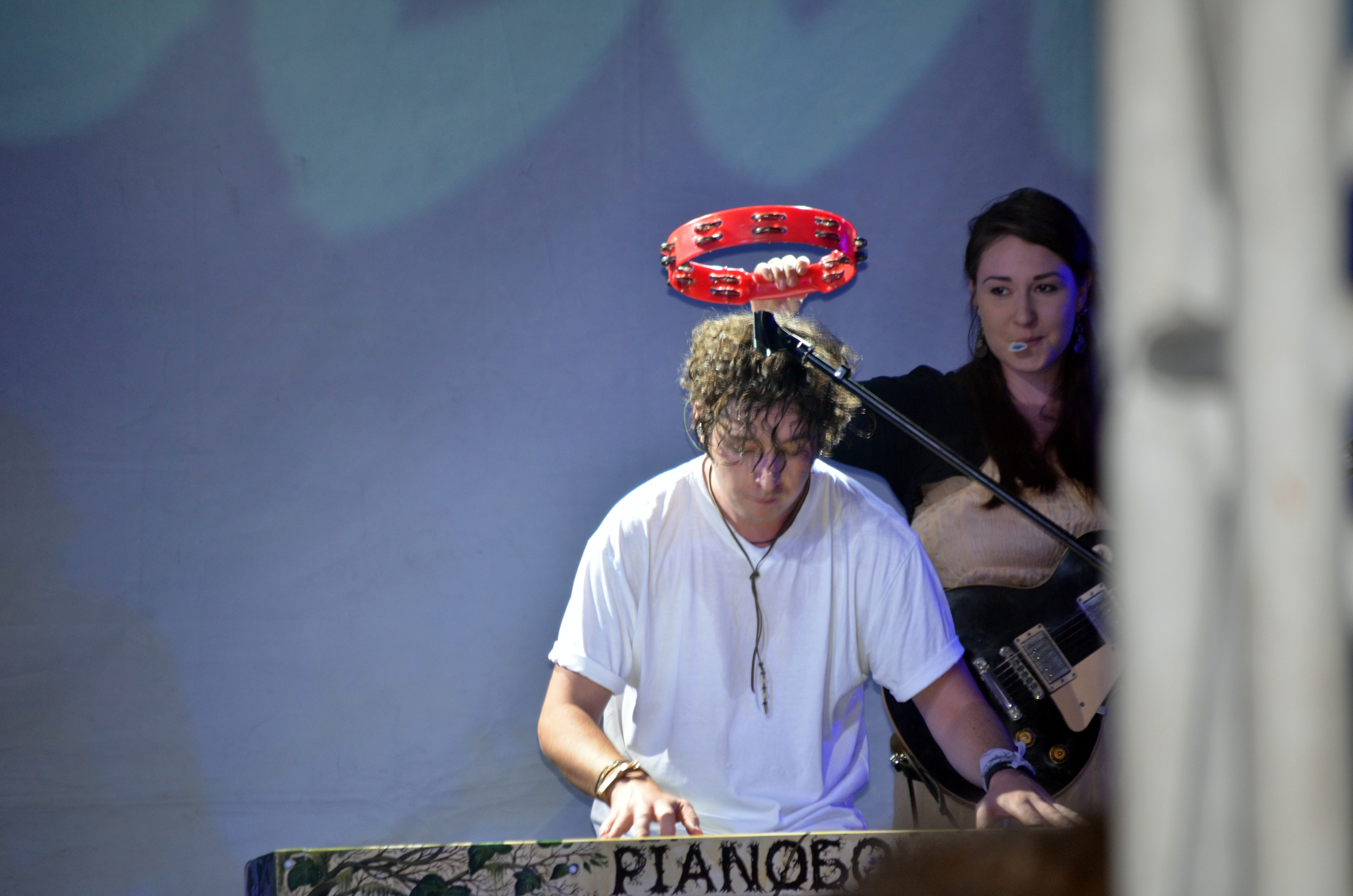
Dmitry and Olga Shurov

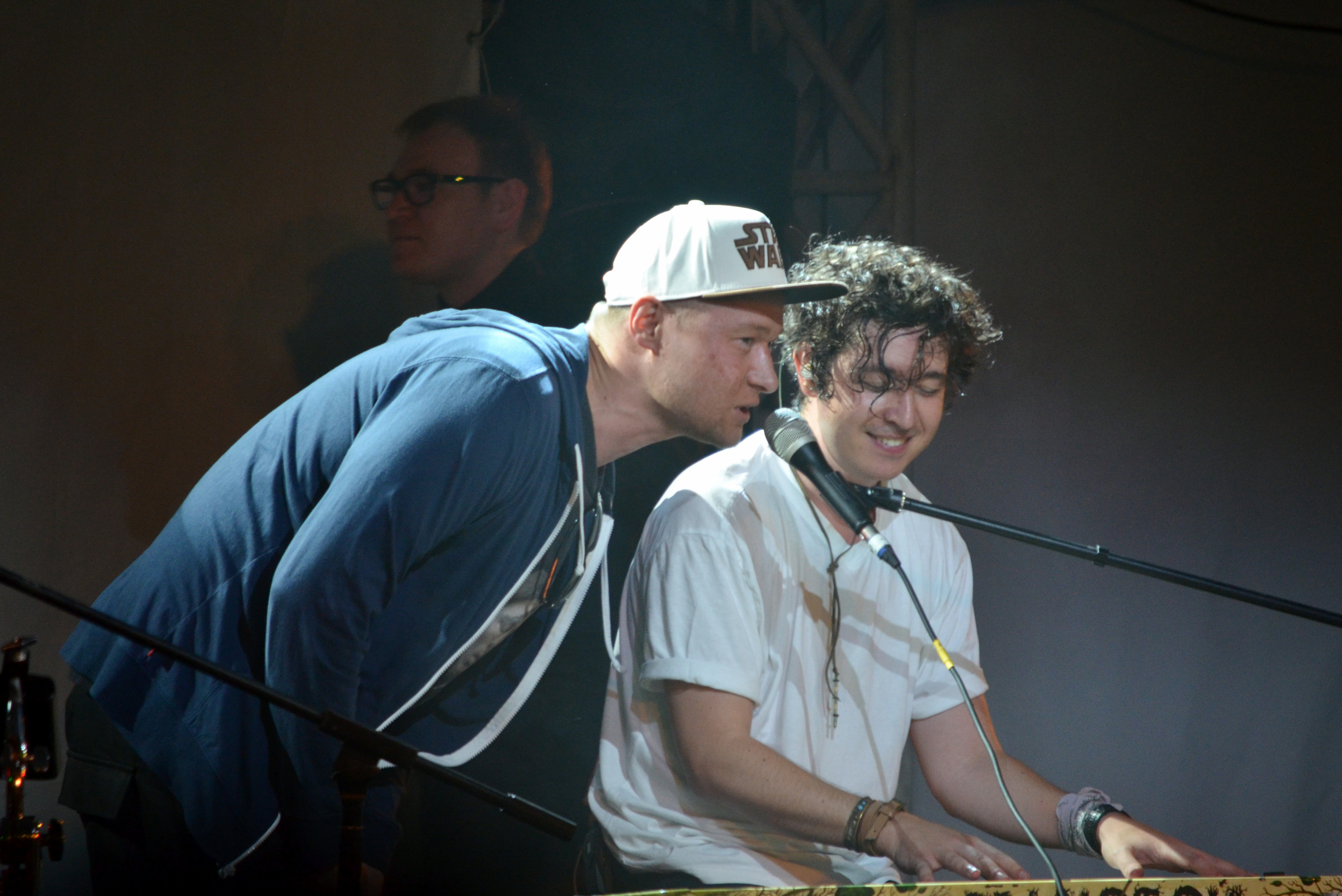
Dmitry Shurov and Andrey Khlyvnyuk from Boombox

At the beginning of 2009, Dmytro Shurov began working on the opera “Lion and Leia,” part of which was performed at the fashion designer Alena Akhmadullina's show in Paris. During the work, Shurov came up with the idea of creating his own group. His sister Olga Shurova, a graduate of the Kyiv Linguistic University, helped him in working on the project, called “Pianoboy”.

Dmitry Shurov's first performance as Pianoboy took place in September 2009 as part of the second Moloko Music Fest. In addition to Dmitry and Olga as a backing vocalist, another backing vocalist Lida Tutuola, guitarist Ilya Galushko and drummer Andrei Nadolsky took part in it. After that, Pianoboy performed at the fashion show of Liliya Litkovskaya's collection, opened the week of British cinema with his set, and played a concert at the birthday celebration of Harper's Bazaar magazine in Kyiv.

In November 2009, the first song, “Smysla.net,” premiered on radio and television, and on December 29, 2009, Pianoboy played his first full-fledged solo concert in Kyiv, where a video for this song was also presented. The video was created by the father of the band's guitarist, theater artist Alexander Druganov Sr., together with Kyiv animator Dmitry Lisenbart, based on the drawings of artist Maria Druganova, Alexander's daughter.

In January 2010, Pianoboy began recording his debut album, and at the end of February he began a club tour in Ukraine. The first lineup of the group included the Shurovs, Tutuola, Nadolsky and guitarist Alexander Druganov. In February 2011, Pianoboy, together with the group Boombox, recorded the song “Floors”. After this, the group began collaborating with the Music for the Masses company and producer Alexei Sogomonov, who is also the producer of Boombox. In 2011, videos were recorded for the songs “Witch”, “Weekend”, “Leak Away” and “Floors” (the latter together with “Boombox”).

In March 2012, Pianoboy, thanks to the song “Witch,” won the “Discovery of the Year” category at the “Chart’s Dozen” award of the Russian radio station “Nashe Radio”. In May 2012, the group's debut album, “Simple Things,” was released. The album was released by Lavina Music. In August 2012, Pianoboy, together with Boombox and TNMK, recorded a cover of Micah and Jumanji's song “For You” for a tribute concert, and in January 2013 they released a video for this cover.

In September 2013, the album “Don't Stop Dreaming” was released. In April 2014, Pianoboy recorded a video for the song “Motherland”. In July 2014, the group's planned concert in Moscow was banned by the government of the Russian capital.

== Group members ==
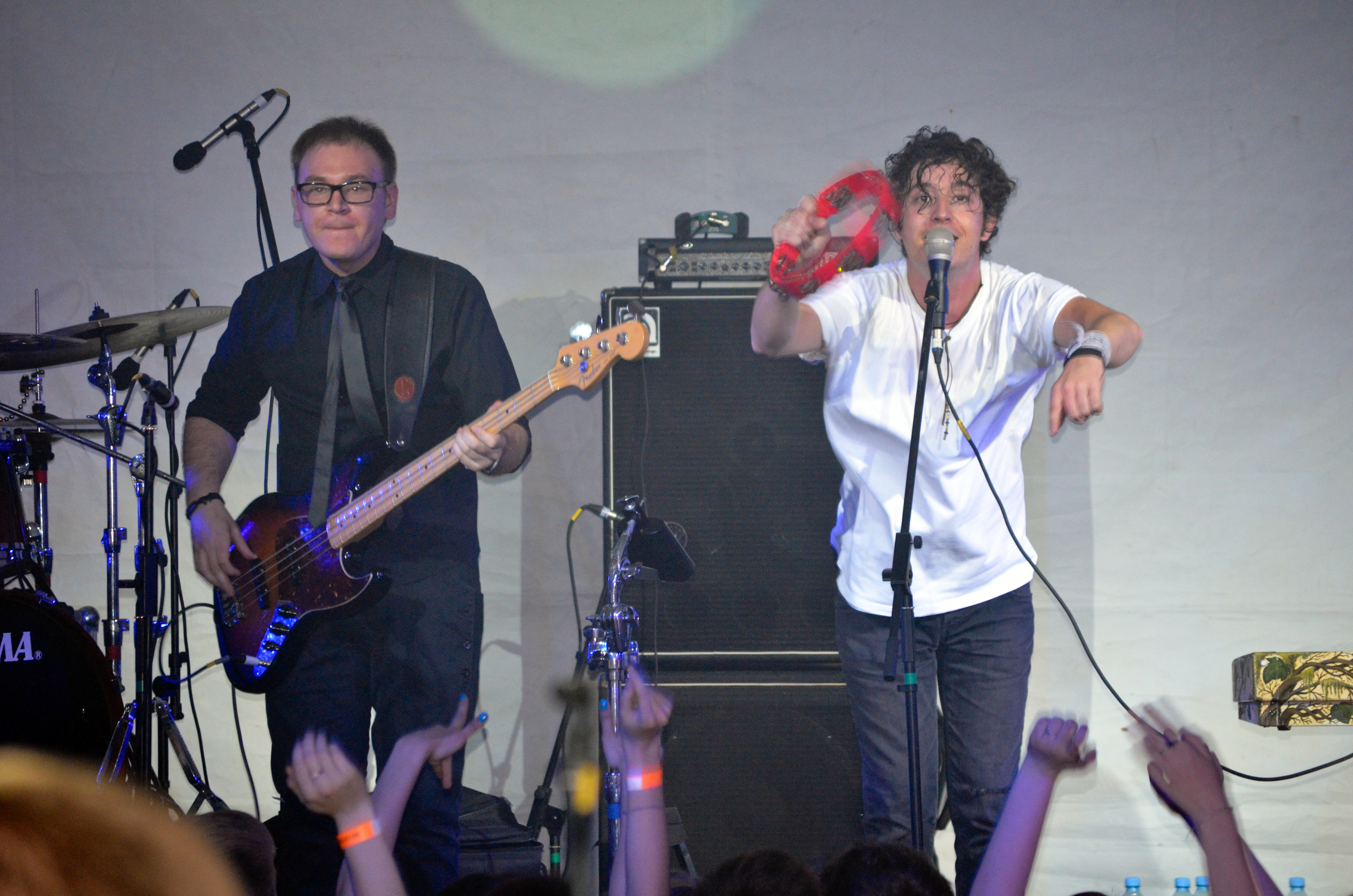
Nikolay Kistenev and Dmitry Shurov

=== Current members ===
- Dmitry Shurov - vocals, piano
- Olga Shurova - backing vocals, keyboards, guitar, percussion
- Nikolay Kistenev - bass guitar
- Grigory Oleinik - drums
- Sergey Gryzlov - guitar
- Matvey Mironov - violin
- Denis Karachevtsev - cello
- Sergey Vilka - flute

=== Former members ===
- Lida Tutuola - backing vocals
- Alexander Druganov - guitar
- Nikolay Khomutov - drums
- Maxim Malyshev - drums
- Alexander Polyakov - drums
- Andrey Nadolsky - drums
- Vladimir Pavlovsky - guitar
- Maxim Tsivina - director

== Discography ==
- "Simple Things" (2012)
- "Don't Stop Dreaming" (2013)
- "Take Off Archived March 31, 2017 on the Wayback Machine" (2015)
- Sense.net (2009)
- Witch (2011)
- Floors (2011)
- Great Weekend (2011)
- Leak Away (2011)
- Simple Things (2012)
- Sveta (2012)
- For you (2013)
- Banderlog (2013)
- Train Archived copy from August 21, 2019, on the Wayback Machine (2013)
- Homeland (2014)
- Grief is Barely Heard Archived November 20, 2017 on the Wayback Machine (2015)
- Kohannya Archived copy from March 31, 2017, on the Wayback Machine (2015)
- Moles Archived March 31, 2017 on the Wayback Machine (2016)
- Champagne eyes Archived copy from November 19, 2017, on the Wayback Machine (2017)
- On the Vershina Archived copy from March 25, 2019, on the Wayback Machine (2017)
- Midnight Sky Archived March 27, 2019 on the Wayback Machine (2017)
- Everything that doesn't bother you (2018)
- Pidruchnik (2018)
- Icebergs(2019)
- Kiss feat. Shy(2019)
- Nichto not himself feat. Open Kids(2019)
- Persha Lady feat. Alina Pash(2019)
- I can do anything (2019)
- Slidey(2019)
- DOSH(2019)
- Pustela(2019)
- Pavutinnya(2019)
- Krishtal (2019)
- Today's Ceremony (2019)
- Do you want a new river (2019)
