= Ukraine in the Eurovision Song Contest 2022 =

- Eurovision Song Contest 2022
- Participating broadcaster: Public Broadcasting Company of Ukraine (UA:PBC)
- Country: Ukraine
- Selection process: Selection among Vidbir 2022 entries
- Selection date: 22 February 2022

Competing entry
- Song: "Stefania"
- Artist: Kalush Orchestra
- Songwriters: Ihor Didenchuk; Ivan Klymenko; Oleh Psiuk; Tymofii Muzychuk; Vitalii Duzhyk

Placement
- Semi-final result: Qualified (1st, 337 points)
- Final result: 1st, 631 points

Participation chronology

Ukraine was represented at the Eurovision Song Contest 2022 with the song "Stefania", written by Ihor Didenchuk, Ivan Klymenko, Oleh Psiuk, Tymofii Muzychuk, and Vitalii Duzhyk, and performed by the group Kalush Orchestra. The Ukrainian participating broadcaster, Public Broadcasting Company of Ukraine (UA:PBC), organised a national final in order to select its entry for the contest. Eight entries competed in the national selection held on 12 February 2022 and "Tini zabutykh predkiv" performed by Alina Pash was selected as the winner following the combination of votes from a three-member jury panel and a public televote. UA:PBC confirmed on 16 February 2022 that Pash would not represent Ukraine following controversy regarding her travel history to the territory of Crimea, and announced the national final runner-up, "Stefania" performed by Kalush Orchestra, as its entry on 22 February 2022.

Ukraine was drawn to compete in the first semi-final of the Eurovision Song Contest which took place on 10 May 2022. Performing during the show in position 6, "Stefania" was announced among the top 10 entries of the first semi-final and therefore qualified to compete in the final on 14 May. It was later revealed that Ukraine placed first out of the 17 participating countries in the semi-final with 337 points. In the final, Ukraine performed in position 12 and placed first out of the 25 participating countries, winning the contest with 631 points including a record televoting score of 439 points. This was Ukraine's third win in the Eurovision Song Contest, having last won in 2016.

== Background ==
Prior to the 2022 contest, the National Television Company of Ukraine (NTU) until 2016, and the Public Broadcasting Company of Ukraine (UA:PBC) since 2017, had participated in the Eurovision Song Contest representing Ukraine sixteen times since NTU's first entry in 2003, winning the contest in 2004 with the song "Wild Dances" performed by Ruslana. Following the introduction of semi-finals for 2004, Ukraine is the only country that has managed to qualify to the final in every contest they have participated in thus far. Ukraine has been the runner-up in the contest on two occasions: in 2007 with the song "Dancing Lasha Tumbai" performed by Verka Serduchka and in 2008 with the song "Shady Lady" performed by Ani Lorak; and it won the contest for a second time in 2016 with "1944" by Jamala. Ukraine's least successful result has been 24th place, which they achieved, as hosts, in 2017, with the song "Time" performed by O.Torvald.

As part of its duties as participating broadcaster UA:PBC organises the selection of its entry in the Eurovision Song Contest and broadcasts the event in the country. The broadcaster confirmed its intentions to participate at the 2022 contest on 18 June 2021. In the past, the broadcasters had alternated between both internal selections and national finals in order to select the Ukrainian entry. Between 2016 and 2020, the broadcaster, in collaboration with commercial broadcaster STB, had set up national finals with several artists to choose both the song and performer, with both the public and a panel of jury members involved in the selection. On 30 August 2021, it was announced that UA:PBC had terminated their partnership with STB, with the broadcaster announcing on 8 October 2021 that they would independently organise a national final to select the 2022 entry. Production companies had the opportunity to submit their proposals until 24 October 2021 and the selected company, Friends Pro TV, was announced on 29 December 2021.

== Before Eurovision ==
=== Vidbir 2022 ===
Vidbir 2022 was the sixth edition of Vidbir, which selected the Ukrainian entry for the Eurovision Song Contest 2022. The competition took place at the NAU Center of Culture and Arts in Kyiv and consisted of a final on 12 February 2022. The show was hosted by Maria Efrosinina with Timur Miroshnychenko as the backstage host, and broadcast on UA:Pershyi, via radio on Radio Promin with commentary by Oleksandr Zakharchenko and Anna Zakletska, and online via UA:PBC's official website tv.suspilne.media as well as Facebook and YouTube broadcasts.

==== Format ====
The selection of the competing entries for the national final and ultimately the Ukrainian Eurovision entry took place over three stages. In the first stage, artists and songwriters had the opportunity to apply for the competition either through an online submission form. Twenty-seven acts were longlisted and announced on 17 January 2022. The second stage involved the longlisted artists attending a scheduled audition during designated dates. Eight acts were selected and announced on 24 January 2022. The third stage was the televised final, which took place on 12 February 2022 and featured the eight acts vying to represent Ukraine in Turin. The winner was selected via the 50/50 combination of votes from a public televote and an expert jury. Both the public televote and the expert jury assigned scores ranging from 1 (lowest) to 8 (highest) and the entry that had the highest number of points following the combination of these scores was declared the winner. Viewers participating in the public televote had the opportunity to submit a single vote per phone number for each of the participating entries via SMS. In the event of a tie, the tie was decided in favour of the entry that received the highest score from the public televote.

==== Competing entries ====
Artists and composers had the opportunity to submit their entries via an online submission form which accepted entries between 14 December 2021 and 10 January 2022. Only artists that had not performed in Russia since 2014 and entered the territory of Crimea without due permission were allowed to apply for the competition. A selection panel that included music producer of the show Mykhailo Koshevy, television producer of the show Oleksiy Honcharenko and UA:PBC managing board member Yaroslav Lodyhin reviewed the 284 received submissions and longlisted 27 entries, of which their artists were announced on 17 January 2022. Auditions were later held at the My Dream Space venue in Kyiv where eight entries were shortlisted to compete in the national final. On 24 January 2022, the eight selected competing acts were announced during a press conference held at the Radio Hub of the Public Media Academy of UA:PBC. Among the finalists was Ihor Didenchuk (member of Kalush Orchestra) who represented Ukraine in 2021 as a member of Go_A.

On 25 January 2022, UA:PBC announced that "Head Under Water", written by Daniel Boting and to have been performed by Laud, was disqualified from the national final as the song was previously released in 2018. "Hear My Words" performed by Barleben was announced as the replacement entry on the same day.

Longlisted artists
- Alina Pash
- Amariia
- Antsia
- Barleben
- DOdoBro
- Cloudless
- Fizruk
- Gorim!
- Idxo
- Kalush Orchestra
- Laud
- Laura Marti
- Michael Soul
- Our Atlantic
- Oyedamola
- Roxolana
- Schor
- Shy
- Skhidzakhid
- Sofia Shanti
- Sowa
- The Blue Artic
- The Tape Machine
- Victoria Niro
- Vika Yagych
- Wellboy
- Yuliia Timochko

Artist	Song	Songwriter(s)
Alina Pash	"Tini zabutykh predkiv" (Тіні забутих предків)	Alina Pash, Taras Bazeev
Barleben	"Hear My Words"	Oleksandr Barleben, Kristina Hromiak
Cloudless	"All Be Alright"	Yurii Kanalosh, Anton Panfilov, Mykhailo Shatokhin
Kalush Orchestra	"Stefania" (Стефанія)	Ihor Didenchuk, Ivan Klymenko, Oleh Psiuk, Tymofii Muzychuk, Vitalii Duzhyk
~~Laud~~	~~"Head Under Water"~~	~~Daniel Boting~~
Michael Soul	"Demons"	Michael Soul, Vlad Freimann, Andrei Katikov, Ilia Paliakou
Our Atlantic	"Moia liubov" (Моя любов)	Viktor Baida, Dmytro Bakal
Roxolana	"Girlzzzz"	Roksoliana Syrota, Mykhailo Gaidai
Wellboy	"Nozzy Bossy"	Anton Velboi, Serhii Yurov, Stepan Oliinik, Yevhen Harbarenko

==== Final ====
The final took place on 12 February 2022. Eight entries competed and the winner, "Tini zabutykh predkiv" performed by Alina Pash, was selected through the combination of votes from a public televote and an expert jury. Ties were decided in favour of the entries that received higher scores from the public televote. The jury panel consisted of Tina Karol (singer, actress and television presenter, represented Ukraine in 2006), Jamala (singer-songwriter, winner of Eurovision for Ukraine in 2016) and Yaroslav Lodyhin (UA:PBC Managing Board member). 77,843 votes were registered by the televote during the show. In addition to the performances of the competing entries, former Ukrainian Eurovision entrants Jamala, Tina Karol and Go_A (2021), as well as former Ukrainian Junior Eurovision entrants Darina Krasnovetska (2018), Sophia Ivanko (2019), Oleksandr Balabanov (2020) and Olena Usenko (2021) performed as guests.

Final – 12 February 2022
R/O	Artist	Song	Jury	Televote		Total	Place
R/O	Artist	Song	Jury	Votes	Points	Total	Place
1 (Note: Due to technical issues during the first performance, Cloudless performed their song again after all the other songs.)	Cloudless	"All Be Alright"	1	3,410	4	5	7
2	Michael Soul	"Demons"	2	1,239	1	3	8
3	Our Atlantic	"Moia liubov"	5	1,605	2	7	6
4	Barleben	"Hear My Words"	4	2,740	3	7	5
5	Kalush Orchestra	"Stefania"	6	38,634	8	14	2
6	Roxolana	"Girlzzzz"	3	5,034	5	8	4
7	Wellboy	"Nozzy Bossy"	7	5,646	6	13	3
8	Alina Pash	"Tini zabutykh predkiv"	8	19,535	7	15	1

Detailed Jury Votes
R/O	Song	T. Karol	Jamala	Y. Lodyhin	Total	Points
1	"All Be Alright"	3	1	1	5	1
2	"Demons"	1	2	4	7	2
3	"Moia liubov"	4	5	6	15	5
4	"Hear My Words"	5	7	2	14	4
5	"Stefania"	7	6	3	16	6
6	"Girlzzzz"	2	3	5	10	3
7	"Nozzy Bossy"	8	4	7	19	7
8	"Tini zabutykh predkiv"	6	8	8	22	8

=== Controversies ===
==== Results announcement issues and dispute ====
Following Alina Pash's victory, runner-up Kalush Orchestra accused the organisers of falsifying the results. Lead singer Oleh Psiuk claimed that the organisers of the selection had refused to speak to him after several technical issues had occurred during the announcement of the results; incorrect points were given during the allocation of the televotes, leading to a failure of the electronic scoreboard with host Timur Miroshnychenko manually announcing the results from a sheet of paper. After the show, a video emerged of Psiuk confronting a producer in a corridor. On a livestream, Psiuk claimed that the producer had refused to answer his questions, and went on to state that he intended to challenge the organisers in court. Suspilne and its audit partner PwC maintained the validity of the results, stating that the technical difficulties had had no impact on the results. Jury member and chairman of the organising committee, Yaroslav Lodyhin, stated that he would be ready to resign from his position as further proof of the broadcaster's good faith. His resignation came into effect on 18 February. The full results of the selection were published on 22 February.

==== Tymofii Muzychuk's travel history ====
On 16 February, a 2015 VK post by Kalush Orchestra member Tymofii Muzychuk surfaced, capturing him in front of St. Basil's Cathedral in Moscow. The group's management stated that the photo had been taken before 2014, and that Muzychuk had traveled to Russia in 2013 to perform at a Mykhailo Poplavskyi concert in Moscow and at an event in Krasnodar, which he claimed to have been his last time in the country.

==== Alina Pash's disqualification ====
Following the controversy surrounding Maruv in the 2019 national final, which led to Ukraine withdrawing from the Eurovision Song Contest that year, a new rule was introduced starting from 2020 which bars artists who have performed in Russia since 2014 or have entered Crimea "in violation of the legislation of Ukraine" from entering the competition. On 14 February 2022, activist and video blogger Serhii Sternenko alleged that Pash had entered Crimea from Russian territory in 2015, and counterfeited her travel documentation with her team in order to take part in Vidbir. UA:PBC subsequently stated that they would request the Ukrainian State Border Guard Service to verify if the documentation is forged, and that Pash would not officially be the Ukrainian representative at the contest "until the verification and clarification of the facts is completed". Andrii Demchenko, speaking on behalf of the Guard Service, maintained that the certificate Pash had handed in to the broadcaster had not been issued by them, but that a request to cross the border had been made by the artist, and that UA:PBC would be provided with the results of the investigation by 16 February at 11:00 (EET). Chairwoman of the broadcaster's Supervisory Board, Svitlana Ostapa, later called a meeting on 18 February in order to discuss the situation surrounding the national final.

Pash's management addressed the accusations stating that she had entered Crimea from the Ukrainian border, and that the certificate had been requested by a "team member" rather than Pash herself. They had assured to be analyzing the circumstances surrounding the obtainment of the document. On 16 February, Pash claimed on an Instagram post that the State Border Guard Service had not been able to provide her with a new certificate as proof of her entrance to Crimea, as she had requested in the wake of the controversy, since related records are only kept for five years. Shortly after, Pash announced on her social media pages that she would withdraw her candidacy as the Ukrainian representative at the Eurovision Song Contest. On the same day, UA:PBC stated it had decided to "cease her participation" and that "the artist agreed with this decision of the organizing committee". On 2 June, Pash admitted to forging the documents and apologised for her actions.

=== Replacement entry selection ===
Following the withdrawal of Alina Pash, UA:PBC stated that one of the entries that competed in the national final would be selected to represent Ukraine at the Eurovision Song Contest 2022 during the 18 February meeting. Kalush Orchestra were offered the proposal on 17 February, however it was later reported that they would refuse to sign the participation contract until the detailed results of the national final were released. On 22 February, simultaneously with the release of the detailed results, the group accepted the offer to represent Ukraine.

=== Preparations ===
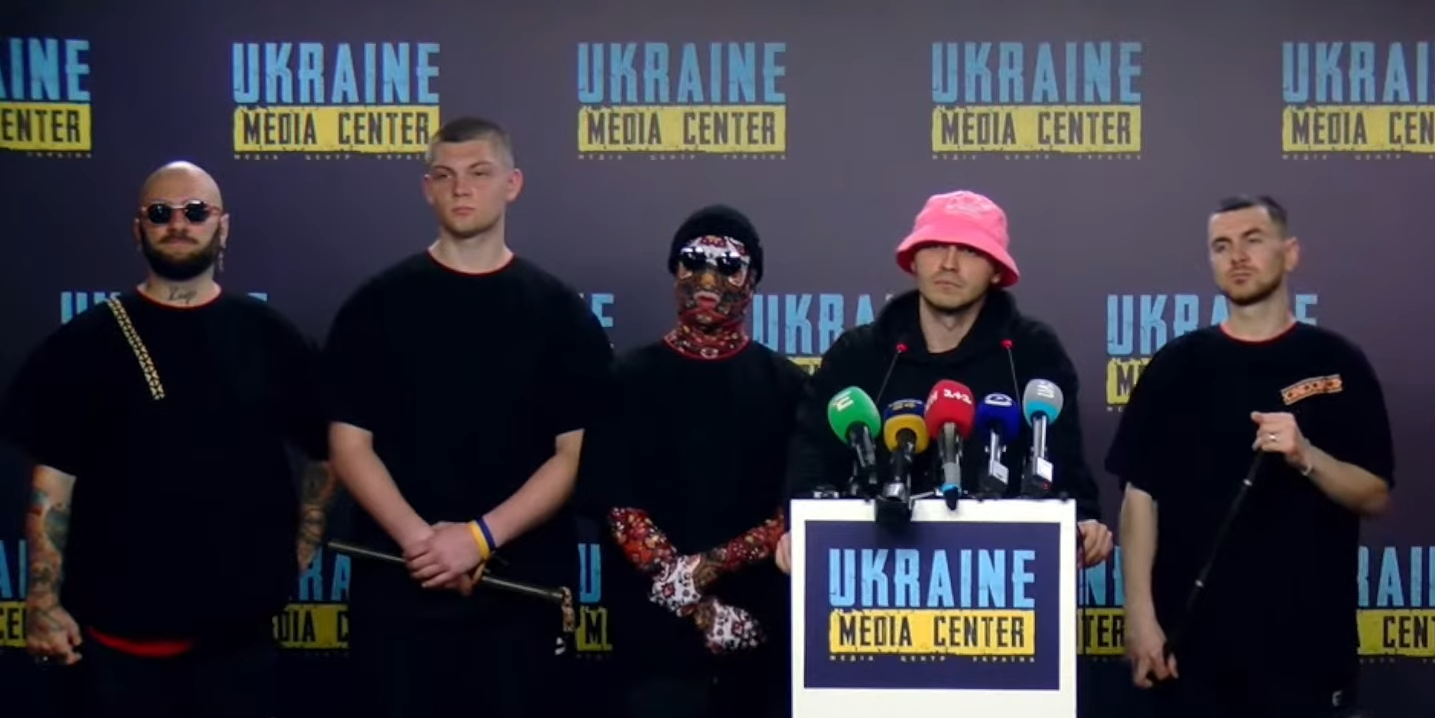
Kalush Orchestra during a press conference in Ukraine before the Eurovision Song Contest

Following the start of the Russian invasion of Ukraine, UA:PBC and Kalush Orchestra had yet to formally comment on whether their Eurovision participation would continue. On 14 March, executive producers of the Eurovision Song Contest 2022, Claudio Fasulo and Simona Martorelli, confirmed that Ukraine would still be competing; this was later reaffirmed by the broadcaster on 19 March via a post on its social media pages. They added that work would commence on their 'live-on-tape' backup performance, which was planned to be recorded in Lviv. The Ukrainian delegation was later exempted from the requirement to do so, with their national final performance acting as the 'live-on-tape' that would be used in the event that the group was unable to travel to Turin. On 2 April, UA:PBC confirmed that Kalush Orchestra and the rest of the delegation were given permission from state authorities to travel to Turin for the contest, adding that the group would also take part in promotional events across Europe to raise donations for war relief efforts.

On 7 April, Kalush Orchestra performed during the Israel Calling event held at the Menora Mivtachim Arena in Tel Aviv, Israel. The group also performed on 9 April during the Eurovision in Concert event which was held at the AFAS Live venue in Amsterdam, Netherlands and hosted by Cornald Maas and Edsilia Rombley, and completed promotional activities in Poland by appearing during the TVP2 morning show Pytanie na śniadanie on 18 April.

== At Eurovision ==
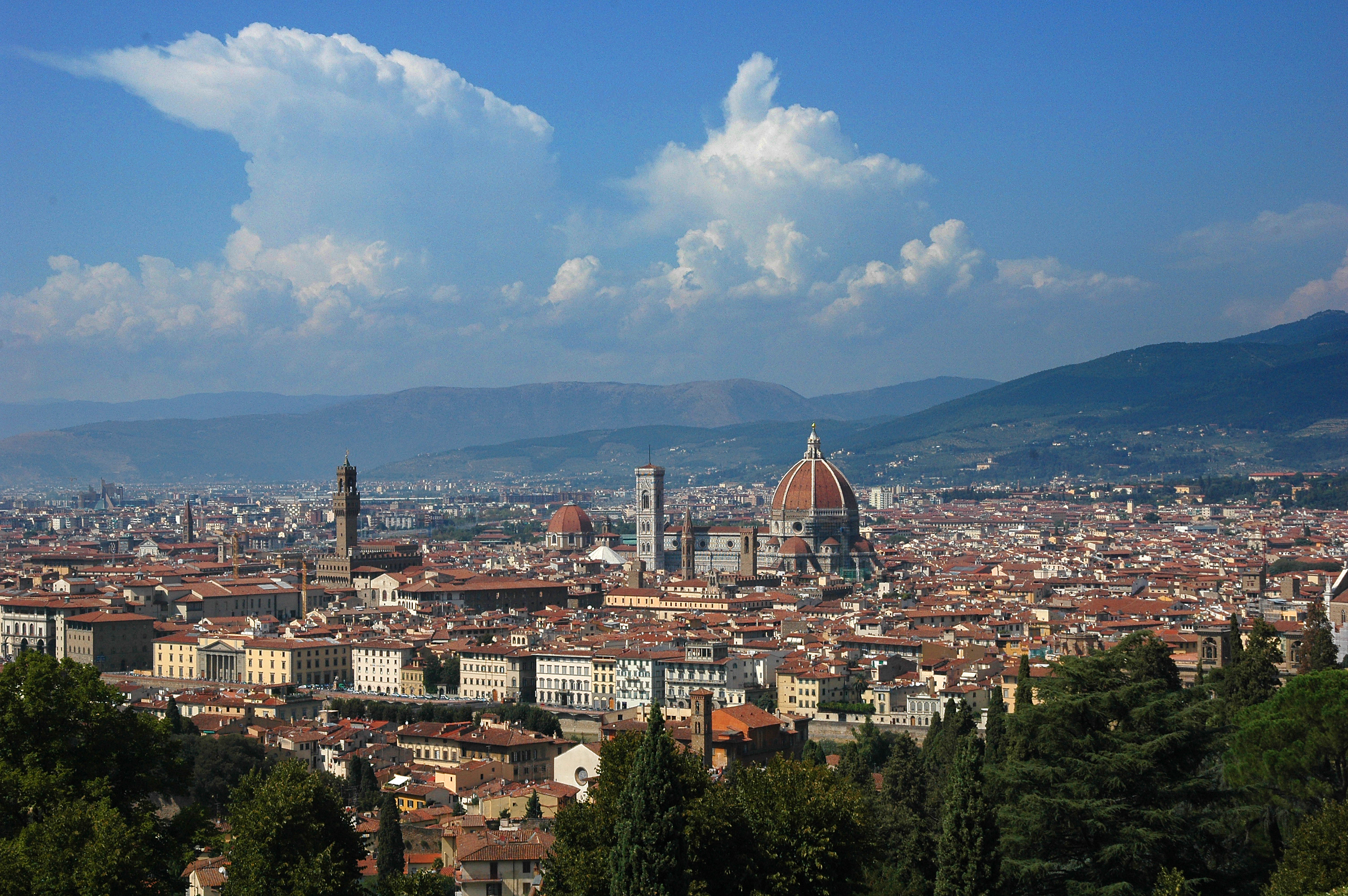
A video postcard introduced the Ukrainian performance in the first semi-final and final of the Eurovision Song Contest 2022. The postcard was filmed in the Italian city of Florence and featured virtual projections of Kalush Orchestra across the location.

According to Eurovision rules, all nations with the exceptions of the host country and the "Big Five" (France, Germany, Italy, Spain and the United Kingdom) are required to qualify from one of two semi-finals in order to compete for the final; the top ten countries from each semi-final progress to the final. The European Broadcasting Union (EBU) split up the competing countries into six different pots based on voting patterns from previous contests, with countries with favourable voting histories put into the same pot. On 25 January 2022, a special allocation draw was held which placed each country into one of the two semi-finals, as well as which half of the show they would perform in. Ukraine was placed into the first semi-final, to be held on 10 May 2022, and was scheduled to perform in the first half of the show.

Once all the competing songs for the 2022 contest had been released, the running order for the semi-finals was decided by the shows' producers rather than through another draw, so that similar songs were not placed next to each other. Ukraine was set to perform in position 6, following the entry from Slovenia and before the entry from Bulgaria.

In Ukraine, both the semi-finals and the final were broadcast on UA:Kultura and via radio on Radio Promin with commentary by Timur Miroshnychenko. UA:PBC appointed Kateryna Pavlenko, who represented Ukraine in 2021 as part of Go_A, as its spokesperson to announce the top 12-point score awarded by the Ukrainian jury during the final.

=== Semi-final ===
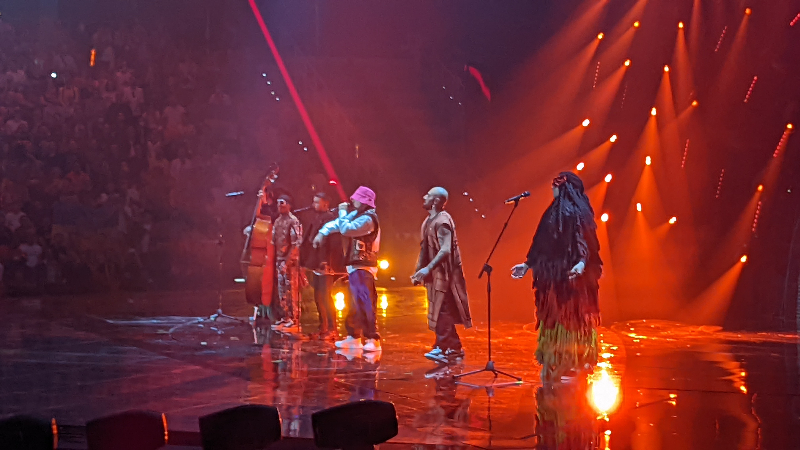
Kalush Orchestra during the first semi-final

Kalush Orchestra took part in technical rehearsals on 30 April and 4 May, followed by dress rehearsals on 9 and 10 May. This included the jury show on 9 May where the professional juries of each country watched and voted on the competing entries.

The Ukrainian performance featured the members of Kalush Orchestra performing on stage in traditional outfits; Oleh Psiuk and Tymofii Muzychuk were both dressed in Ukrainian historical costumes from Hutsul. The stage displayed blue and yellow lighting with the view of a sunrise appearing on the LED screens at the beginning, and was followed by silhouettes of the group members that leaned left and right as well as hands and eyes, the latter of which symbolised the eyes of a mother that was "filled with tears because of the lost spring, and her hands that protect the yellow-and-blue universe" as stated by the Ukrainian delegation. The stage director and choreographer for the Ukrainian performance was Oleksii Zhembrovskyi. Before the semi-final, it was revealed that the group were requested multiple times to rework their staging plans to remain apolitical, as "guided by the rules of 'out of politics'".

At the end of the show, Ukraine was announced as having finished in the top 10 and subsequently qualifying for the grand final. It was later revealed that Ukraine placed first in the semi-final, receiving a total of 337 points: 135 points from the juries and 202 points from the televote.

=== Final ===
Shortly after the first semi-final, a winners' press conference was held for the ten qualifying countries. As part of this press conference, the qualifying artists took part in a draw to determine which half of the grand final they would subsequently participate in. This draw was done in the order the countries appeared in the semi-final running order. Ukraine was drawn to compete in the first half. Following this draw, the shows' producers decided upon the running order of the final, as they had done for the semi-finals. Ukraine was subsequently placed to perform in position 12, following the entry from the Netherlands and before the entry from Germany.

Kalush Orchestra once again took part in dress rehearsals on 13 and 14 May before the final, including the jury final where the professional juries cast their final votes before the live show. The group performed a repeat of their semi-final performance during the final on 14 May. After the group finished their performance, Oleh Psiuk shouted: "I ask all of you, please help Ukraine, Mariupol. Help Azovstal, right now!" The contest's rules precludes promoting political statements and messages, and several commentators noted that Psiuk's statement could be in breach of the rules. However, the EBU deemed the statement to be "humanitarian rather than political in nature”.

Ukraine won the contest placing first with a score of 631 points: 439 points from the televoting (received from every country with all but Serbia awarding 8, 10 or 12 points) and 192 points from the juries. This was Ukraine's third victory in the Eurovision Song Contest; their previous victories were in 2004 and 2016. "Stefania" also became the first song sung entirely in Ukrainian to win the contest, and the first winning song in the hip-hop genre.

=== Voting ===
Voting during the three shows involved each country awarding two sets of points from 1-8, 10 and 12: one from their professional jury and the other from televoting. Each nation's jury consisted of five music industry professionals who are citizens of the country they represent. This jury judged each entry based on: vocal capacity; the stage performance; the song's composition and originality; and the overall impression by the act. In addition, each member of a national jury may only take part in the panel once every three years, and no jury was permitted to discuss of their vote with other members or be related in any way to any of the competing acts in such a way that they cannot vote impartially and independently. The individual rankings of each jury member in an anonymised form as well as the nation's televoting results were released shortly after the grand final.

Below is a breakdown of points awarded to Ukraine and awarded by Ukraine in the first semi-final and grand final of the contest, and the breakdown of the jury voting and televoting conducted during the two shows:

==== Points awarded to Ukraine ====
Points awarded to Ukraine (Semi-final 1)
Score	Televote	Jury
12 points	Armenia; Austria; Bulgaria; Croatia; Denmark; Iceland; Italy; Latvia; Lithuania; Moldova; Netherlands; Portugal	Albania; Latvia; Lithuania; Moldova
10 points	France; Greece; Norway; Slovenia; Switzerland	France; Iceland
8 points	Albania	Netherlands; Switzerland
7 points		Armenia; Croatia; Denmark; Italy; Portugal; Slovenia
6 points		Norway
5 points		
4 points		
3 points		Greece
2 points		
1 point		

Points awarded to Ukraine (Final)
Score	Televote	Jury
12 points	Australia; Austria; Azerbaijan; Belgium; Bulgaria; Cyprus; Czech Republic; Denmark; Estonia; Finland; France; Georgia; Germany; Iceland; Ireland; Israel; Italy; Latvia; Lithuania; Moldova; Netherlands; Norway; Poland; Portugal; San Marino; Spain; Sweden; United Kingdom	Latvia; Lithuania; Moldova; Poland; Romania
10 points	Albania; Armenia; Croatia; Greece; Montenegro; Romania; Slovenia; Switzerland	France; Germany; Iceland
8 points	Malta; North Macedonia	Croatia; Portugal; Slovenia
7 points	Serbia	Albania; Australia; Cyprus; Israel
6 points		Armenia; Azerbaijan; Belgium; Georgia; Montenegro
5 points		Denmark
4 points		Czech Republic
3 points		Ireland; Norway; Switzerland
2 points		San Marino
1 point		

==== Points awarded by Ukraine ====
Points awarded by Ukraine (Semi-final 1)
Score	Televote	Jury
12 points	Lithuania	Netherlands
10 points	Moldova	Armenia
8 points	Iceland	Portugal
7 points	Norway	Greece
6 points	Netherlands	Switzerland
5 points	Latvia	Denmark
4 points	Portugal	Iceland
3 points	Austria	Croatia
2 points	Armenia	Moldova
1 point	Greece	Norway

Points awarded by Ukraine (Final)
Score	Televote	Jury
12 points	Poland	United Kingdom
10 points	Lithuania	Portugal
8 points	Iceland	Netherlands
7 points	United Kingdom	Greece
6 points	Moldova	Switzerland
5 points	Estonia	Azerbaijan
4 points	Finland	Sweden
3 points	Netherlands	Australia
2 points	Norway	Armenia
1 point	Spain	Czech Republic

==== Detailed voting results ====
The following members comprised the Ukrainian jury:

- Andriy Yatskiv
- Andriy Kapral
- Iryna Fedyshyn
- Lukian Halkin
- Vadym Lysycia

Detailed voting results from Ukraine (Semi-final 1)
R/O	Country	Jury							Televote	
R/O	Country	Juror A	Juror B	Juror C	Juror D	Juror E	Rank	Points	Rank	Points
01	Albania	16	15	16	16	11	16		16	
02	Latvia	13	13	7	10	9	12		6	5
03	Lithuania	12	14	12	14	13	14		1	12
04	Switzerland	5	2	8	5	14	5	6	12	
05	Slovenia	15	16	10	15	15	15		15	
06	Ukraine									
07	Bulgaria	6	7	11	13	12	11		14	
08	Netherlands	1	4	4	2	1	1	12	5	6
09	Moldova	3	11	14	9	16	9	2	2	10
10	Portugal	4	1	2	4	2	3	8	7	4
11	Croatia	7	9	9	12	5	8	3	13	
12	Denmark	8	8	5	6	3	6	5	11	
13	Austria	14	12	15	7	10	13		8	3
14	Iceland	9	6	6	8	8	7	4	3	8
15	Greece	11	5	3	3	6	4	7	10	1
16	Norway	10	10	13	11	4	10	1	4	7
17	Armenia	2	3	1	1	7	2	10	9	2

Detailed voting results from Ukraine (Final)
R/O	Country	Jury							Televote	
R/O	Country	Juror A	Juror B	Juror C	Juror D	Juror E	Rank	Points	Rank	Points
01	Czech Republic	14	3	14	18	19	10	1	16	
02	Romania	23	17	13	21	16	22		17	
03	Portugal	5	6	3	2	2	2	10	13	
04	Finland	17	13	17	19	14	20		7	4
05	Switzerland	8	8	2	5	4	5	6	22	
06	France	20	11	23	14	7	14		14	
07	Norway	15	14	18	13	11	16		9	2
08	Armenia	12	7	12	8	13	9	2	23	
09	Italy	21	15	21	12	5	12		21	
10	Spain	22	12	22	24	18	23		10	1
11	Netherlands	6	2	4	4	3	3	8	8	3
12	Ukraine									
13	Germany	10	16	16	15	21	18		12	
14	Lithuania	24	20	19	11	17	21		2	10
15	Azerbaijan	1	9	5	6	8	6	5	19	
16	Belgium	9	21	20	16	24	19		18	
17	Greece	4	5	6	3	6	4	7	24	
18	Iceland	16	19	8	10	15	13		3	8
19	Moldova	18	18	7	23	23	17		5	6
20	Sweden	13	4	9	9	9	7	4	11	
21	Australia	3	24	11	17	10	8	3	20	
22	United Kingdom	2	1	1	1	1	1	12	4	7
23	Poland	11	10	15	7	12	11		1	12
24	Serbia	19	23	24	22	22	24		15	
25	Estonia	7	22	10	20	20	15		6	5

==== Controversy ====
The Ukrainian jury votes in the final faced scrutiny on Ukrainian and Polish social media. While the Polish jury awarded 12 points to Ukraine, the Ukrainian jury did not award Poland any points (the Ukrainian televote awarded 12 points to Poland regardless); this led to some suggesting that the Ukrainian jury votes might have been affected by pro-Russia agents intending to damage relations between the two countries. Ukraine's ambassador to Poland Andrii Deshchytsia and the Ukrainian minister of culture Oleksandr Tkachenko criticized the jury's decision, with the latter calling it "embarrassing". The Ukrainian jury members stated that their votes represented their own views, and were not related to any political considerations.
