= Carpetman =

Ukrainian singer-songwriter and record producer

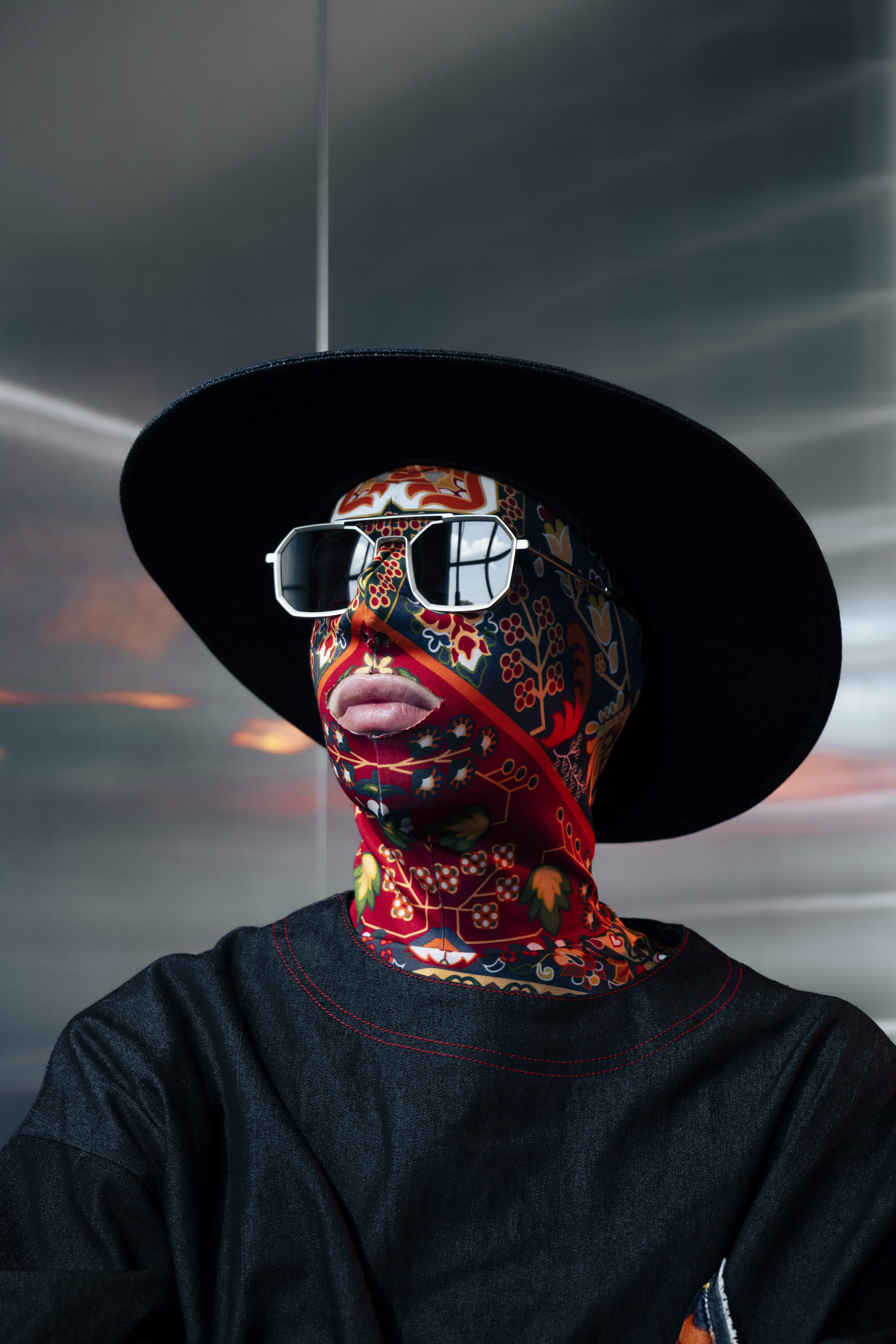
- Carpetman in 2025

Background information
- Also known as: MC Kylymmen
- Origin: Ukraine
- Genres: House; blues; pop; trap-pop; R&B; EDM; ambient
- Occupations: Singer; songwriter; record producer
- Instruments: Guitar; piano; violin; bass guitar; ukulele
- Years active: 2023–present
- Labels: Artist Partner Group; Universal Music Poland
- Member of: Kalush Orchestra; Kalush

MC Kylymmen, often known as Carpetman, is a Ukrainian singer, songwriter, and music producer. He began releasing music in 2023 and incorporating elements of house, blues, pop, trap-pop, R&B, electronic dance music (EDM), and ambient into his work. He has not publicly disclosed his real name. He is also a member of both Kalush Orchestra and Kalush with his fellow member, Oleh Psiuk.

== Early life ==
Little is known about Carpetman's personal background. He is from Ukraine and is reported to be self-taught in songwriting and music production. His musical influences include both classical performers and contemporary artists, among them Ray Charles.

His early releases combine acoustic and electronic elements, reflecting a mix of stylistic influences.

== Career ==
On September 2, 2023, Carpetman released his debut single, Live Without a System. The release received attention from listeners and commentators, and subsequent recordings highlighted his use of multiple instruments, including guitar, piano, violin, bass guitar, and ukulele.

In spring 2024, the track Feel So Cold gained popularity on TikTok, where it was used in memes, remixes, and dance videos. The song marked Carpetman's first significant exposure to an international audience. Following its online success, music industry representatives began monitoring his work more closely.

In July 2024, Carpetman signed a recording contract with Artist Partner Group and entered into a management and booking agreement with Wasserman. His music is distributed internationally through Artist Partner Group in partnership with Universal Music Group Poland.

In 2025, Carpetman continued releasing and collaborating on new material. Together with Theo Remme on the EP Struggling By Myself, which included the tracks Struggling By Myself and Trembling Island. He also collaborated with his brother, who performs under the stage name Black Soil, releasing the singles Let It Burn and Alleys of My Mind.

On March 21, 2025, Carpetman released the single Shades of Gray, a collaboration with Ukrainian DJ Scott Rill, released via Spinnin’ Records. The track received attention on social media platforms and was played in clubs and DJ sets.

== Personal life ==
Carpetman keeps his identity private. He has a brother who performs under the stage name Black Soil, with whom he has collaborated on multiple releases.

His anonymity, combined with the consistent quality of his music, allows Carpetman to cultivate his own audience and leave a lasting impact in the digital space, while maintaining the intrigue that attracts both fans and media attention.

== Discography ==
=== Singles and music videos ===
Release type	Title	Year	Format	Label	Notes (charts, certifications)
Single + Music video	"Live Without a System"	2023		APG / UMG	
Single + Music video	"My Honey"	2023		APG / UMG	
Single + Music video	"Feel So Cold"	2023		APG / UMG	
Single + Music video	"Endless Fight"	2023		APG / UMG	
Single + Music video	"Can’t Lose More"	2024		APG / UMG	
Single + Music video	"You Will Never Know It"	2024		APG / UMG	
Single + Music video	"Anyway, I Love It"	2024		APG / UMG	
Single + Music video	"What Does It Mean to You"	2024		APG / UMG	
Single + Music video	"Make It Lower"	2024		APG / UMG	
Single + Music video	"Smoking Cherry"	2025		APG / UMG	
Single + Music video	"WalKing Through The Code"	2025		APG / UMG	
Single + Music video	"Shades of Gray"	2025		Spinnin’ Records	
Single + Music video	"Let It Burn"	2025		APG / UMG	
Single + Music video	"Alleys of My Mind"	2025		APG / UMG	
Single + Music video	"Call Me Insane"	2025		APG / UMG	
Single + Music video	"Manuscript"	2025		APG / UMG	
Single + Music video	"Ain'tgottafeelthatpain"	2025		APG / UMG	
Single + Music video	"What's goin' 0n"	2025		APG / UMG	
Single + Music video	"Golden Tears"	2025		APG / UMG	
Single + Music video	"Other Worlds"	2025		APG / UMG	
Single	"...(OST Carpetwood)"	2026		APG / UMG	
Single + Music video	"Gorgone"	2026		APG / UMG	

=== EPs / mini-albums ===
Title	Year	Label
Struggling By Myself	2024	APG / UMG

=== Music videos ===
- "Trembling Island" (2024).

== Live performances and tours ==
=== Headline shows and tours ===
Type	Date	City	Venue / Tour Name	Notes
Headline Show	Sep 7, 2024	The Kingdom of Bahrain	The Quarry	
Headline Show	May 6, 2025	Washington, DC	Pearl Street Warehouse	
Headline Show	May 7, 2025	Philadelphia, PA	Kung Fu Necktie	
Headline Show	May 27, 2025	Seattle, WA	Madame Lou's	
Tour	Apr–May 2025	Various (USA)	Echoes Of Time tour	w/ Hippie Sabotage

=== Festivals and showcases ===
Year/Date	Event/Festival	Location	Stage(s)	Type
2024	SXSW	Austin, USA	SHANGRI-LA, Embassy Suites Hotel South Congress, Hilton Austin, CUATRO GATO	Showcase
2025	SXSW	Austin, USA	Hilton Austin, CUATRO GATO, Las Perlas, Rivian Park	Showcase
2025	ESNS	Groningen, Netherlands	De Oosterpoort – Kelder	Showcase
Jun 28, 2025	Europavox Festival	France	Scene Factory	Festival
Jul 19, 2025	Colours of Ostrava	Czech Republic	Fresh Stage	Festival
Jul 25, 2025	Brasswood Festival	Poland	Main Stage	Festival
Aug 7, 2025	Ypsigrock Festival	Italy		Festival
Aug 9, 2025	Summer Well Festival	Romania		Festival
Aug 27, 2025	YpSZIN Festival	Hungary		Festival
Sep 13, 2025	Radar Festival	Switzerland		Festival
Oct 11, 2025	Nurnberg Festival	Germany		Festival
