= Stefania (song) =

2022 song by Kalush Orchestra

Single by Kalush Orchestra
- Language: Ukrainian
- Released: 7 February 2022
- Genre: Alternative hip hop; folk
- Length: 2:59
- Label: Sony Music Entertainment
- Composers: Ihor Didenchuk; Tymofii Muzychuk; Vitalii Duzhyk; Anton Chilibi
- Lyricists: Ivan Klymenko; Oleh Psiuk

Kalush Orchestra singles chronology
"Shtomber Womber" (2022)	"Stefania" (2022)	"In the Shadows of Ukraine" (2023)

Music video
- "Stefania" on YouTube

Eurovision Song Contest 2022 entry
- Country: Ukraine

Finals performance
- Semi-final result: 1st
- Semi-final points: 337
- Final result: 1st
- Final points: 631

Entry chronology
- ◄ "Shum" (2021)
- "Heart of Steel" (2023) ►

Official performance video
- "Stefania" (First Semi-Final) on YouTube "Stefania" (Grand Final) on YouTube

"Stefania" (stylized in cursive script; Ukrainian: Стефанія, romanized: Stefaniya, pronounced [steˈfɑn⁽ʲ⁾ijɐ]) is a song by Ukrainian folk-rap group Kalush Orchestra, co-written by all group members alongside Ivan Klymenko and was released through Sony Music Entertainment. It was Ukraine's winning entry in the Eurovision Song Contest 2022, held in Turin.

"Stefania" has been described as an alternative hip hop and folk song. It is the third song sung entirely in Ukrainian to represent Ukraine at Eurovision, but the second to compete at the contest following the cancellation of Eurovision 2020. The song won the contest with 631 points, becoming the first replacement song, the first rap song and the first song sung entirely in Ukrainian to win. "Stefania" charted in twenty-two music markets, topping the charts in Ukraine and Lithuania, while also reaching the top ten within Finland, Croatia, Iceland, Hungary and Sweden.

In 2022 The Independent ranked "Stefania" as 15th best Eurovision winner, and in 2023 The Guardian ranked the song as 24th best Eurovision winner.

== Background ==
=== Conception ===
"Stefania" was co-written by all Kalush Orchestra members alongside Ivan Klymenko. It has been described as an ode to a mother, with the narrator speaking of good memories of his own mother. The song initially talks about how much his mother has aged, invoking a nostalgic past. The song later addresses the hardships of a mother, with the narrator realizing how much the mother has done for him. A "lullaby", within the end of each rap verse, brings the narrator back to when his mother took care of him. The song is dedicated to frontman Oleh Psiuk's mother, who is also named Stefania. Two traditional Ukrainian woodwind instruments are featured in the song: the sopilka and the telenka.

=== Vidbir 2022 ===
"Stefania" was an entry in Vidbir 2022, the televised music competition organised by the Public Broadcasting Company of Ukraine (UA:PBC) to determine its entrant for the 66th edition of the Eurovision Song Contest. The selection of the competing entries for Vidbir took place over three stages. In the first stage, artists and songwriters had the opportunity to apply for the competition through an online submission form. Twenty-seven acts were longlisted and announced on 17 January 2022. The second stage was a scheduled audition at designated dates and featured the twenty-seven acts in the longlist. Eight acts were selected to advance, which were announced on 24 January 2022. The third stage was the final, which took place on 12 February 2022 and featured the eight acts vying to represent Ukraine in Turin. The winner was selected via a 50/50 combination of votes from a public televote and a three-member expert jury, consisting of 2006 and 2016 Ukrainian entrants Tina Karol and Jamala, alongside Yaroslav Lodyhin a board member of UA:PBC.

Artists and composers had the opportunity to submit their entries between 14 December 2021 and 10 January 2022. Only artists that had not performed in a concert in Russia since 2014 or entered the territory of Crimea since 2014 were able to apply for the competition. A selection panel including the music producer of the show, Mykhailo Koshevy, and the television producer of the show, Oleksiy Honcharenko, reviewed the 284 submissions, and twenty-seven entries that had been longlisted were announced on 17 January 2022. Auditions were later held at the My Dream Space venue in Kyiv where eight entries were shortlisted to compete in the national final. On 24 January 2022, the eight selected competing acts were announced. In the Vidbir final, held on 12 February, Alina Pash emerged as the winner with the song "Shadows of Forgotten Ancestors", but she ultimately declined her position after being involved in a controversy for having breached the rule barring Vidbir competitors from having traveled to Russia or Crimea. As a result, UA:PBC offered Kalush Orchestra to represent Ukraine in replacement of Pash. On 22 February, the group accepted the offer, so "Stefania" became the Ukrainian entrant for Eurovision.

Two days after they accepted, Russia launched a full-scale invasion of Ukraine, and "Stefania" subsequently became a popular wartime soundtrack on social media. On 2 April, UA:PBC confirmed that Kalush Orchestra and the rest of its delegation were given permission from state authorities to leave the country to participate in the contest, adding that the group would also take part in promotional events across Europe to raise donations for war relief efforts.

=== Eurovision ===
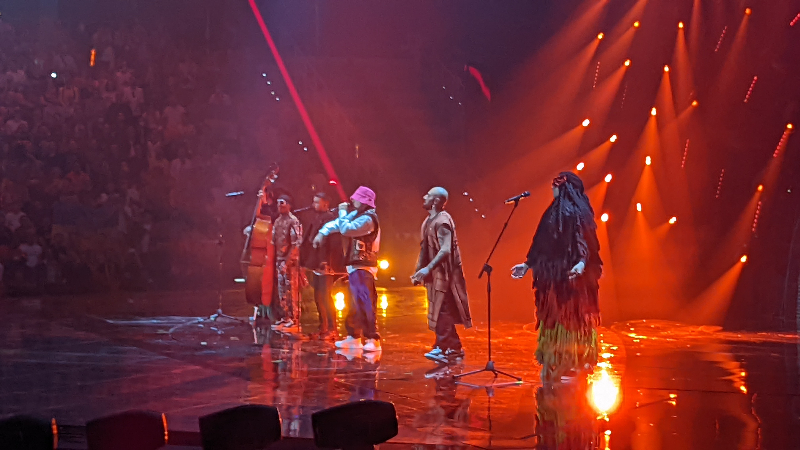
Kalush Orchestra performing "Stefania" at Eurovision

On 10 May 2022, the first semi-final of the Eurovision Song Contest was held at the PalaOlimpico in Turin hosted by Radiotelevisione italiana (RAI) and broadcast live throughout the continent and abroad. Kalush Orchestra performed "Stefania" sixth in a field of seventeen songs, and qualified for the grand final. After the grand final it was revealed that it had achieved first place, based on a combination of first placing from televote and third from jury.

On 14 May 2022, Kalush Orchestra performed again "Stefania" twelfth in a field of twenty-six in the grand final of the Eurovision Song Contest. At the end of the jury vote, the song finished in fourth place with 192 points. It received then 439 points from the televote, the highest number in the contest's history to date, receiving points from every country (with all but Malta, North Macedonia, and Serbia giving the country 10 or 12 points). The combination of the points from the jury and the televote resulted in 631 points, placing "Stefania" first, and winning the contest.

=== Aftermath ===
After winning Eurovision, Kalush Orchestra collected 54 million hryvnias in support of Ukraine through its concerts, charity meetings and auctions. This amount does not include funds from joint concerts with other artists. The group subsequently embarked on a promotional tour across Europe and North America to collect donations in support of Ukraine. European viewers were urged to donate to the "Save Ukrainian Culture" initiative, created with the support of the Ukrainian Ministry of Culture. During their time at the Glastonbury Festival in June 2022, Kalush Orchestra performed "Stefania" for female volunteers who help Ukrainian refugees in London. The group additionally performed the song at the Royal Horse Guards Parade in front of the Palace of Whitehall in central London.

In August 2022, Kalush Orchestra performed in the Italian city of Monopoli at the Madonna della Madia festival, with the participation of Ukrainian immigrant children, who danced and sang "Stefania" on stage. On the eve of Ukrainian Independence Day, 23 August, Kalush Orchestra announced a 24-hour fundraiser of 24 hryvnias for the rehabilitation of Ukrainian soldiers in Mariupol.

As the winning broadcaster, the European Broadcasting Union (EBU) gave UA:PBC the responsibility to host the following edition of the Eurovision Song Contest. As the broadcaster was unable to host the event due to the Russian invasion, the British Broadcasting Corporation (BBC) acted as host broadcaster on its behalf. The grand final, held on 13 May 2023 in Liverpool, was opened by Kalush Orchestra performing "Stefania" and their new single "Changes". They also presented the trophy to the winner.

== Music video ==
On 10 March 2022, the video of the performance of "Stefania" from Vidbir 2022 was posted on the Eurovision YouTube channel. The music video for the song, directed by Max Ksjonda, was released on 15 May, shortly after the song won Eurovision. The video was filmed in April in the cities of Bucha, Irpin, Borodianka, and Hostomel, all of which had been attacked during the Russian invasion of Ukraine. The video depicts military women in destroyed cities taking numerous children away from burning and bombed-out buildings, and returning them to their mothers.

== Commercial performance ==
"Stefania" charted in twenty-two music markets, topping the charts in Ukraine and Lithuania, while also reaching the top ten within Finland, Croatia, Iceland, Hungary and Sweden.

=== Weekly charts ===
Chart (2022)	Peak position
Australia Digital Tracks (ARIA)	27
Austria (Ö3 Austria Top 40)	26
Belgium (Ultratop 50 Flanders)	24
Canada Digital Song Sales (Billboard)	26
Croatia (Billboard)	6
Czech Republic Singles Digital (ČNS IFPI)	22
CIS (Tophit)	98
Finland (Suomen virallinen lista)	2
Germany (GfK)	22
Global 200 (Billboard)	85
Greece International (IFPI)	9
Hungary (Single Top 40)	5
Iceland (Tónlistinn)	7
Ireland (IRMA)	30
Italy (FIMI)	53
Lithuania (AGATA)	1
Netherlands (Dutch Top 40)	38
Netherlands (Single Top 100)	36
Norway (VG-lista)	19
Portugal (AFP)	92
Slovakia (Singles Digitál Top 100)	27
Sweden (Sverigetopplistan)	7
Switzerland (Schweizer Hitparade)	11
UK Singles (Official Charts)	38
Ukraine Airplay (TopHit)	1
US World Digital Song Sales (Billboard)	2

=== Monthly charts ===
Chart (2022)	Peak position
Ukraine Airplay (Tophit)	1

=== Year-end charts ===
Chart (2022)	Position
Iceland (Tónlistinn)	67
Lithuania (AGATA)	19
Ukraine Airplay (TopHit)	3

Chart (2023)	Position
Ukraine Airplay (TopHit)	14

=== Certifications ===
Region	Certification	Certified units/sales
Poland (ZPAV)	Platinum	50,000^{‡}
^{‡} Sales+streaming figures based on certification alone.

Preceded by "Zitti e buoni" by Måneskin	Eurovision Song Contest winners 2022	Succeeded by "Tattoo" by Loreen
