= Kalush Orchestra =

Ukrainian band

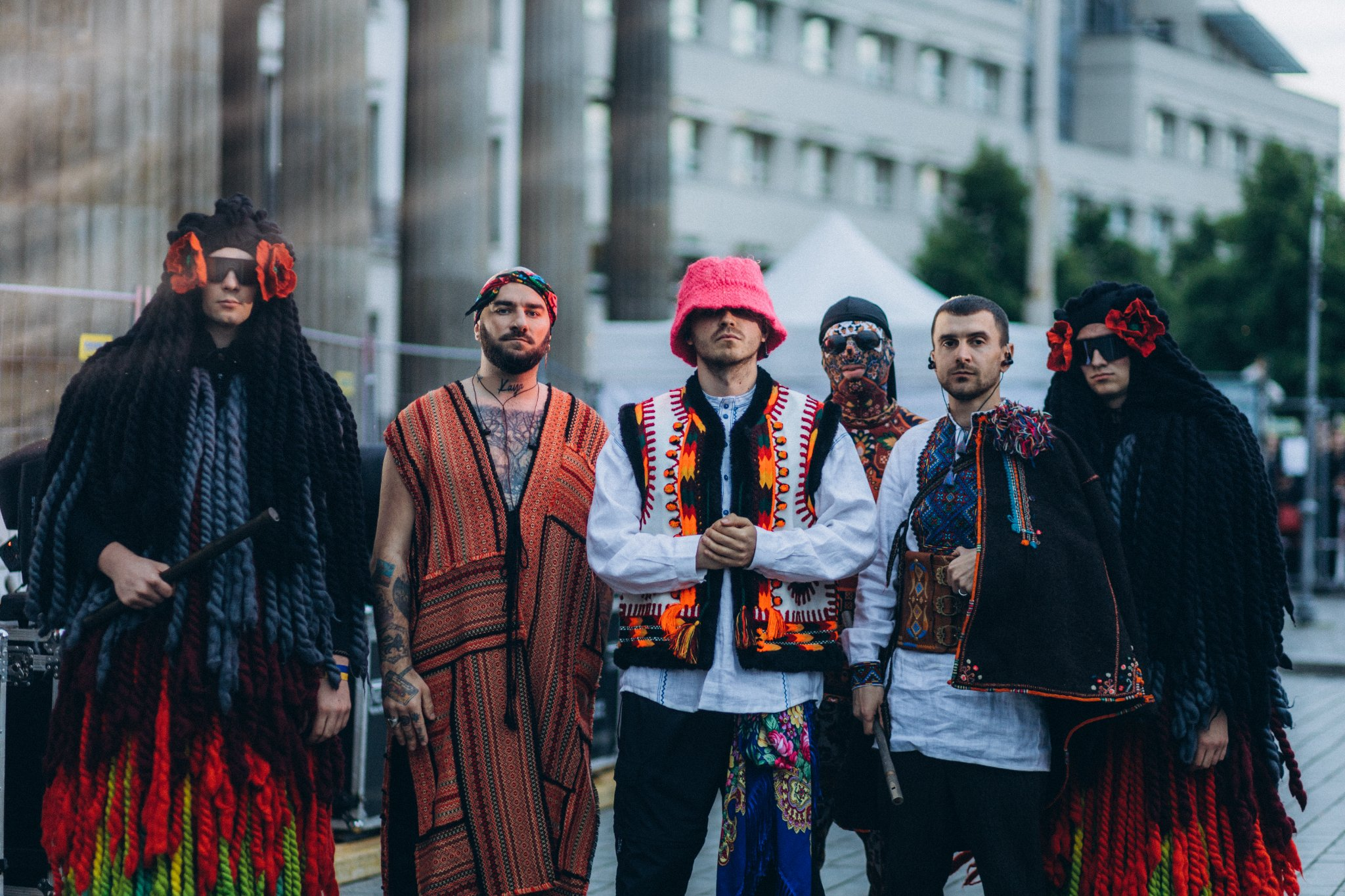
- Kalush Orchestra in 2022

Background information
- Origin: Kalush, Ukraine
- Genres: Hip hop; Folk rap
- Years active: 2021–present
- Label: Universal Music
- Spinoff of: Kalush
- Members: Oleh Psiuk; Tymofii Muzychuk; Sasha Tab; Sasha Kondratiuk; Vitalii Duzhyk; MC Kylymmen
- Past members: Andrii Handziuk; Ihor Didenchuk

Kalush Orchestra is a Ukrainian folk-hip hop group founded in 2021 as a side project of Kalush, performing hip-hop music in the Ukrainian language. They represented Ukraine in the Eurovision Song Contest 2022 with the song "Stefania" and went on to win the competition, securing Ukraine's third Eurovision win. Kalush Orchestra combines elements of Ukrainian folk music with modern production, hip-hop dance, and Ukrainian-language rap.

== History ==
=== Creation ===
Kalush Orchestra was created in 2021 as a group of six musicians, as well as a side project of rap group Kalush, which was founded in 2019. The name comes from the city of Kalush – frontman Oleh Psiuk's hometown in the Ivano-Frankivsk region.

=== Eurovision Song Contest and subsequent ventures ===
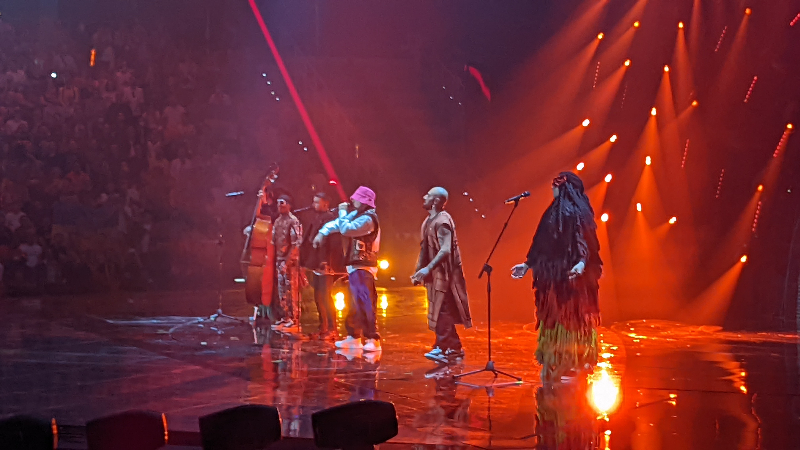
Kalush Orchestra performing "Stefania" at the Eurovision Song Contest 2022

On 12 February 2022, Kalush Orchestra competed to represent Ukraine in the Eurovision Song Contest 2022 in Turin, Italy with the song "Stefania". In the final of the national selection Vidbir, they placed second with 14 points (six from the jury and eight from the audience). Alina Pash received the highest score of the jury - 8 points. The audience rated her performance 7 points. These results ultimately brought the singer the first place in the rating table. Despite coming in second place, the band were offered the chance to represent Ukraine at Eurovision, after Pash withdrew her candidacy due to controversy regarding her travel history in Crimea. On 22 February, Kalush Orchestra accepted the offer. On the same day, the Ukrainian public broadcaster Suspilne published the official voting results of Vidbir 2022, confirming that Pash had been correctly chosen as the winner, contrary to Psiuk's claims.

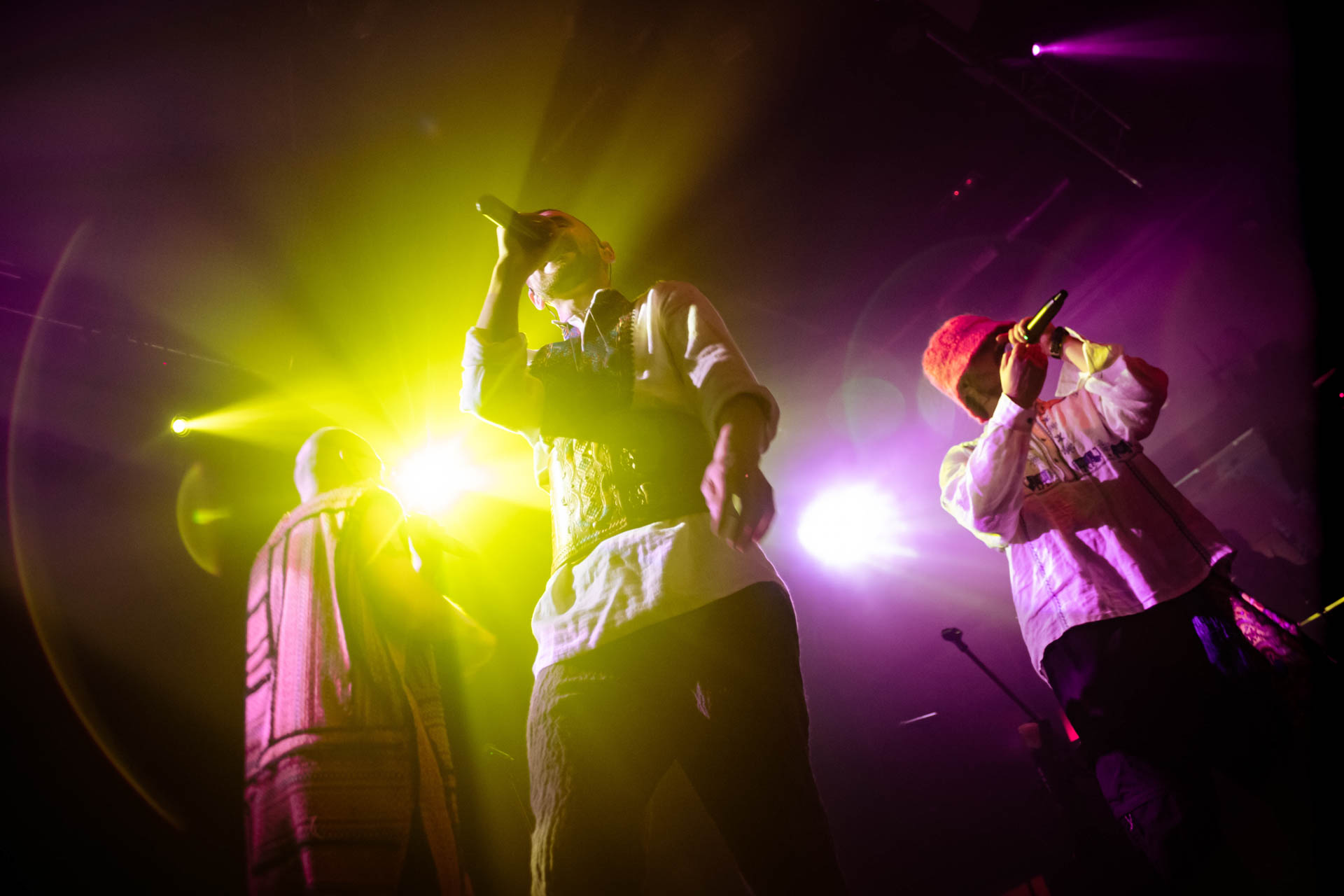
Kalush Orchestra performing in Poland in September 2022

The group won the Eurovision final on 14 May with 631 points, securing Ukraine's third Eurovision victory. "Stefania" became the first song with rap lyrics to win the contest, as well as the winning song with the highest number of televote points in the history of the contest. The group later announced that they would put their Eurovision trophy up for auction to raise money for the Ukrainian armed forces. The trophy was sold for US$900,000, with proceeds earmarked for purchase of combat drones for Ukraine's military. The group subsequently embarked on a promotional tour across Europe and North America to raise awareness and donations for Ukrainian efforts in combating the Russian invasion. In November 2022, the group performed "Oy na hori" and "Stefania" at the 2022 MTV Europe Music Awards.

On 12 July 2023, the group released "Chase" and "Human" as part of the Spotify Singles project. The tracks were recorded at Spotify Studios in Los Angeles.

On July 14, 2023, a Spotify Singles billboard featuring the Kalush Orchestra appeared in Times Square.

In June 2023, Kalush Orchestra presented their third English-language track title "In the Fire".

In September 2023, the band released the first track "Vogon' goryt'", which means "the fire is burning" without the participation of Oleh Psiuk. The release was dedicated to an experimental mini-tour that took place in December 2023.

In late September and early October 2023, the band held its first tour of Ukraine. The tour consisted of 12 concerts at which money was traditionally raised to help Ukraine.

In November 2023, the band toured North America for the third time.

On December 15, 2023, the band released the song "Tse liubov", which means "this is love" and its music video. In the clip, the artists were presented in new images.

In February 2024 Kalush Orchestra released track and music video "Yangolom" with means "Angel" about love.

On April 5, 2024, Kalush Orchestra released the song "Viter vie" and a music video for it.

== Charity ==
On May 30, 2022, the award for winning the Eurovision Song Contest 2022 — the crystal microphone, was sold by "Kalush Orchestra" and Serhiy Prytula for $900,000 at a charity auction. This was the first time the trophy was sold in its history. The trophy was acquired by the Ukrainian cryptocurrency exchange WhiteBIT. Also, at the auction, the pink panama hat of the band's lead singer was sold, raising 11 million hryvnias. The Serhiy Prytula Charity Foundation announced that the funds raised would be spent on a PD-2 unmanned aerial complex for the Ukrainian army.

On the eve of Independence Day, August 23, 2022, Kalush Orchestra announced a 24-hour fundraiser, collecting 24 hryvnias each for the rehabilitation of the defenders of Mariupol. They managed to raise 5 million hryvnias.

Since August 2022, Kalush Orchestra has become ambassadors of the "Save Ukrainian Culture" project, initiated by the Ministry of Culture and Information Policy and the operator Vodafone Ukraine. The band carries a unique QR code to their concerts, through which they collect funds for the reconstruction of destroyed cultural monuments. After a performance in the USA, Kalush Orchestra donated 330 thousand hryvnias for the restoration of the Hryhorii Skovoroda museum in Kharkiv region, which was almost completely burned down by the Russian military.

In March 2023, MC Kylymmen became an artist of the star landing of the All-Ukrainian public initiative for the adaptation of displaced children "Ambassador of Childhood," providing psychological and social assistance to refugee children and displaced children.

On March 30, 2023, Kalush Orchestra became ambassadors of the militarized police unit «Lut'» which means «Fury».

In December 2023, the band, together with the "Peremoga" Charitable Foundation, implemented the project "Magical Mail of Saint Nicholas," aiming to fulfill the dreams of children affected by the war. MC Kylymmen personally selected and sent gifts to 50 children, totaling about 150,000 hryvnias.

During their third tour of North America in 2023, the band raised 990,225 thousand hryvnias for charity.

In January 2024, the band, together with the EKO-market store chain and the "Tvoya opora" charity fund, launched a fundraiser for water purification facilities to provide clean drinking water to the Kherson Regional Hospital. In one month, the goal of 1.9 million UAH was reached. In June 2024, the facilities were installed at the hospital.

== Interesting facts ==
On October 6, 2022, members of the band met Arnold Schwarzenegger and photographed him in a pink bucket hat. Later, Schwarzenegger appeared in the band's music video for the song "Shchedryi Vechir". On May 16, 2023, Kalush Orchestra performed at the Austrian World Summit upon Schwarzenegger's invitation, an event founded by the actor.

On April 10, 2023, the company "Ukrposhta" issued a new postage stamp featuring Kalush Orchestra in the hometown of the band's frontman, Oleh Psiuk, in Kalush, Ivano-Frankivsk region.

On May 13, 2023, Kalush Orchestra opened the grand final of the Eurovision Song Contest in Liverpool with the number "Voices of Generation." The introduction featured the song "Stefania" in a unique setting. The song "traveled" through various locations from Ukraine to Liverpool, journeying around the world from subways to chamber orchestras. Global stars, including British superstar Joss Stone and Andrew Lloyd Webber, joined the rappers. Princess of Wales Kate Middleton also participated in the performance. Middleton was shown playing the piano accompanied by Kalush Orchestra and Sam Ryder, who came in second place in Eurovision 2022. Apart from "Stefania," Kalush Orchestra also introduced their new English single "Changes".

In December 2023, the band conducted a European mini-tour without the participation of the band's frontman Oleh Psiuk.

In May 2022, the train on the route Kyiv-Ivano-Frankivsk received the official name "Stefania Express". This is the first train in the world to honor a mother in its name. The train at Kyiv, Kalush and Ivano-Frankivsk stations is greeted with the song "Stefania", which the band performed at the Eurovision Song Contest 2022 in Turin, Italy.

== Members ==
=== Current members ===
- Oleh Psiuk – lead singer
- Tymofii Muzychuk – vocals and instrumentals
- Oleksandr "Tab" Slobodianyk – vocals
- Oleksandr Kondratiuk – vocals and instrumentals
- Vitalii Duzhyk – instrumentals
- MC Kylymmen – breakdance

== Discography ==
=== Singles ===
Title	Year	Peak chart positions									
Title	Year	UKR	BEL (FL)	GER	IRE	ITA	LTU	NLD	NOR	SWE	UK
"Shtomber Womber"	2021	—	—	—	—	—	—	—	—	—	—
"Trynda" (with Kozak Siromaha)	2021	—	—	—	—	—	—	—	—	—	—
"Stefania"	2022	1	24	22	30	53	1	36	19	7	38
"Oi na hori"	2022	—	—	—	—	—	—	—	—	—	—
"Dole moia"	2022	—	—	—	—	—	—	—	—	—	—
"Skolykhnulas' "	2022	—	—	—	—	—	—	—	—	—	—
"O Mamo " (with Sal'to Nazad)	2022	—	—	—	—	—	—	—	—	—	—
"In the Shadows of Ukraine" (with The Rasmus)	2022	30	—	—	—	—	—	—	—	—	—
"Nasze domy" (with Szpaku)	2022	—	—	—	—	—	—	—	—	—	—
"Shchedrivka"	2022	—	—	—	—	—	—	—	—	—	—
"Numo kozaky" (with Kozak Siromaha)	2022	—	—	—	—	—	—	—	—	—	—
"Changes"	2023	—	—	—	—	—	—	—	—	—	—
"Ushme Uturbe" (with bbno$ and Ditvak)	2023	—	—	—	—	—	—	—	—	—	—
"In the Fire"	2023	—	—	—	—	—	—	—	—	—	—
"Chase"	2023	—	—	—	—	—	—	—	—	—	—
"Human" (with Jona XX)	2023	—	—	—	—	—	—	—	—	—	—
"Vogon’ goryt’"	2023	—	—	—	—	—	—	—	—	—	—
"Tse Liubov"	2024	—	—	—	—	—	—	—	—	—	—
"Yangolom"	2024	—	—	—	—	—	—	—	—	—	—
"Viter vie"	2024	—	—	—	—	—	—	—	—	—	—
"Коли"	2024	—	—	—	—	—	—	—	—	—	—
"—" denotes a recording that did not chart in that territory.

==== As featured artist ====
Title	Year	Album
"Cry for You" (Ochman featuring Kalush Orchestra)	2023	Testament

== Awards and nominations ==
Award Ceremony	Year	Work	Category	Result
Berlin Music Video Awards	2023	Changes	Best Cinematography	Nominated

Awards and achievements
Preceded by Go_A with "Shum"	Ukraine in the Eurovision Song Contest; 2022	Succeeded by Tvorchi with "Heart of Steel"
Preceded by (Italy) Måneskin with "Zitti e buoni"	Winner of the Eurovision Song Contest; 2022	Succeeded by (Sweden) Loreen with "Tattoo"
