= List of countries in Eurovision Young Dancers =

Participation since 1985: Entered at least once Never entered, although were eligible to do so Competed as a part of another country (Yugoslavia), but never as a sovereignty

Broadcasters from thirty-six countries have participated in Eurovision Young Dancers since it started in 1985, with winners coming from eleven of those countries. This biennial dance competition organised by the European Broadcasting Union (EBU) was held between members of the union, who participate representing their countries. Broadcasters sent to the competition one young talented dancer or couple aged 16 to 21, with each performing a dance routine of their choice.

Participation in the contest was primarily open to all broadcasters with active EBU membership, with only one entrant per country allowed in any given year. To become an active member of the EBU, a broadcaster has to be from a country which is covered by the European Broadcasting Area –that is not limited only to the continent of Europe–, or is a member state of the Council of Europe. Thus, eligibility was not determined by geographic inclusion within Europe, despite the "Euro" in "Eurovision", nor did it have a direct connection with the European Union.

== Participants ==
Eurovision Young Dancers, inspired by the success its counterpart Eurovision Young Musicians, was a biennial competition organised by the European Broadcasting Union (EBU) for European dancers that are aged between 16 and 21. The first edition of Eurovision Young Dancers, then known as Eurovision Competition for Young Dancers, took place in Reggio Emilia, Italy, on 16 June 1985 and twelve countries took part. Spain won the first edition in 1985, represented by Arantxa Argüelles. Norway, represented by Arne Fagerholt, and Sweden, represented by Mia Stagh and Göran Svalberg, came second and third respectively. The 2019 contest was cancelled, so it was excluded from the table. In October 2020, the EBU ruled out bringing the contest back until further notice.

Country	Broadcaster(s)	Debut year	Final entry	Entries	Finals	Times qualified	Last final	Wins	Final win
Albania	RTSH	2015		1	0	0/1	N/A	0	N/A
Armenia	Armenia TV (2003); AMPTV (2013)	2003	2013	2	0	0/2	N/A	0	N/A
Austria	ORF	1987	2001	5	3	2/4	1995	0	N/A
Belarus	BTRC	2013		1	0	0/1	N/A	0	N/A
Belgium (Note: In 1987, Belgium and Netherlands competed together with a joint entry. In the competition, the two dancers represented the Dutch colors.)	VRT (Dutch); RTBF (French)	1985	2005	11	8	6/9	2005	0	N/A
Bulgaria	BNT	1991		1	1	1/1	1991	0	N/A
Canada	CBC	1987	1989	2	1	0/1	1987	0	N/A
Croatia	HRT	2011		1	0	0/1	N/A	0	N/A
Cyprus	CyBC	1989	2005	9	0	0/9	N/A	0	N/A
Czech Republic	ČT	1999	2017	7	2	2/7	2005	1	2003
Denmark	DR	1985	1993	5	4	2/3	1991	1	1987
Estonia	ERR	1993	2003	4	2	2/4	2005	0	N/A
Finland	Yle	1985	2005	11	9	7/9	2005	0	N/A
France	France Télévisions	1985	1999	7	7	5/5	1999	1	1989
Germany	ZDF (1985–2001); WDR (ARD) (2011–2017)	1985	2017	13	8	6/11	2013	1	1999
Greece	ERT	1993	2011	8	4	4/8	2005	0	N/A
Hungary	MTV	1995	1999	3	0	0/3	N/A	0	N/A
Ireland	RTÉ	2001		1	0	0/1	N/A	0	N/A
Italy	RAI	1985	1991	4	2	0/2	1987	0	N/A
Kosovo	RTK	2011		1	0	0/1	N/A	0	N/A
Latvia	LTV	1997	2005	5	5	5/5	2005	0	N/A
Malta	PBS	2015	2017	2	0	0/2	N/A	0	N/A
Netherlands	NPO	1985	2015	11	9	7/9	2013	2	2013
Norway	NRK	1985	2017	13	3	1/11	2011	1	2011
Poland	TVP	1993	2017	11	8	8/11	2017	3	2017
Portugal	RTP	1989	2017	4	0	0/4	N/A	0	N/A
Romania	TVR	2003	2005	2	2	2/2	2005	0	N/A
Russia	VGTRK	1995		1	1	1/1	1995	0	N/A
Slovakia	STV	1997	2015	2	1	1/2	1997	0	N/A
Slovenia	RTV SLO	1993	2017	11	3	3/11	2017	0	N/A
Spain	TVE	1985	1999	8	8	6/6	1999	5	1997
Sweden	SVT	1985	2017	15	11	9/13	2005	1	2003
Switzerland	SRG SSR	1985	2003	9	8	6/7	2003	0	N/A
Ukraine	NTU	2001	2013	3	1	1/3	2003	1	2003
United Kingdom	BBC	1985	2005	7	5	3/5	2005	1	1989
Yugoslavia	JRT	1987	1991	3	1	0/2	1987	0	N/A

=== Other EBU members ===
The following countries had broadcasters eligible to participate in Eurovision Young Dancers, but never made their debut at the contest.

- Andorra – RTVA
- Algeria – EPTV
- Azerbaijan – İTV
- Bosnia and Herzegovina – BHRT
- Egypt – ERTU
- Georgia – GPB
- Iceland – RÚV
- Israel – IBA
- Jordan – JRTV
- Lebanon – TL
- Libya – LNC
- Lithuania – LRT
- Luxembourg – RTL
- Moldova – TRM
- Monaco – GRMC, TMC
- Montenegro – RTCG
- Morocco – SNRT
- North Macedonia – MRT
- San Marino – SMRTV
- Serbia – RTS
- Tunisia – ERTT
- Turkey – TRT
- Vatican City – RV

== Participating countries by decade ==
Line graph showing the number of countries participating in each Eurovision Young Dancers. View source data.

The table lists the participating countries in each decade since the first Eurovision Young Dancers was held in 1985.

Table key
#	Debutant	The country made its debut during the decade.
1	Winner	The country won the contest.
2	Second place	The country was ranked second.
3	Third place	The country was ranked third.
X	Remaining places	The country placed from fourth to last in the final.
†	Non-qualified for the final	The country did not qualify for the final (1989–2017).
C	Cancelled	The contest was cancelled after the deadline for submitting songs had passed (2019).
	No entry	The country did not enter the contest.

=== 1980s ===
1985–1989
Country	1985	1987	1989
Austria #		Х	†
Belgium #	Х	Х	Х
Canada #		Х	†
Cyprus #			†
Denmark #	Х	1	X
Finland #	Х	Х	Х
France #	Х	Х	1
Germany #	Х	3	Х
Italy #	Х	Х	†
Netherlands #	Х	Х	Х
Norway #	2	Х	†
Portugal #			†
Spain #	1	Х	Х
Sweden #	3	X	Х
Switzerland #	Х	2	Х
United Kingdom #	Х	Х	1
Yugoslavia #		Х	†

=== 1990s ===
1991–1999
Country	1991	1993	1995	1997	1999
Austria		3	X		
Belgium	†	†	3	2	Х
Bulgaria #	Х				
Cyprus	†	†	†	†	†
Czech Republic #					†
Denmark	3	†			
Estonia #		†		†	
Finland	†	X	†	X	X
France	2	3	Х		X
Germany	Х	Х	†	†	1
Greece		†	X	†	X
Hungary #			†	†	†
Italy	†				
Latvia #				X	X
Netherlands	Х				X
Norway	†	†	†		
Poland		X	X	X	X
Portugal	†				
Russia #			X		
Slovakia #				X	
Slovenia		†	†	†	†
Spain	1	1	1	1	3
Sweden	X	X	2	3	2
Switzerland	Х	2	Х		†
United Kingdom					†
Yugoslavia	†				

=== 2000s ===
2001–2005
Country	2001	2003	2005
Armenia #		†	
Austria	†		
Belgium	2	†	3
Cyprus	†	†	†
Czech Republic	†	1	X
Estonia	X	X	
Finland	X	X	X
Germany	Х		
Greece	†	X	X
Ireland #	†		
Latvia	X	X	X
Netherlands	3	Х	1
Norway	†	†	†
Poland	1	†	2
Romania #		X	X
Slovenia	†	†	†
Sweden	X	1	Х
Switzerland	Х	Х	
Ukraine #	†	1	
United Kingdom	X	†	X

=== 2010s ===
2011–2019
Country	2011	2013	2015	2017	~~2019~~
Albania #			†		
Armenia		†			
Belarus #		†			
Croatia #	†				
Czech Republic		†	†	†	
Germany	†	2	†	†	
Greece	†				
Kosovo #	†				
Malta #			†	†	C
Netherlands	X	1	†		
Norway	1	†	†	†	
Poland	†	†	1	1	C
Portugal	†			†	
Slovakia			†		
Slovenia	2	†	2	2	
Sweden	†	†	†	†	
Ukraine		†			

== Broadcast in non-participating countries ==
Country	Broadcaster(s)	Year(s)
Iceland	Ríkisútvarpið (RÚV)	2003
Jordan	Jordan Radio and Television Corporation (JRTV)	1989
Puerto Rico	Unknown	2003
Serbia and Montenegro	Udruženje javnih radija i televizija (UJRT)	2003

== List of winners ==
=== By contest ===
Year	Date	Host city	No.	Winner(s)	Performer(s)	Dance
1985	16 June	(Italy) Reggio Emilia	12	Spain	Arantxa Argüelles	Unknown
1987	31 May	(Germany) Schwetzingen	14	Denmark	Rose Gad Poulsen and Nikolaj Hübbe	Divertissement from La Sylphide
1989	28 June	(France) Paris	17	France (Note: The Eurovision Young Dancers 1989 event had two sets of first prize, one for contemporary dance (awarded to France) and one for classical dance (awarded to United Kingdom).)	Agnès Letestu (Contemporary dance)	Grand pas classique Notre Dame de Paris
1989	28 June	(France) Paris	17	United Kingdom	Tetsuya Kumakawa (Classical ballet)	Don Quixote Kolya's variation
1991	5 June	(Finland) Helsinki	15	Spain	Amaya Iglesias	Variations from La Grisi
1993	15 June	(Sweden) Stockholm	15	Spain	Zenaida Yanowsky	Esmeralda
1995	6 June	(Switzerland) Lausanne	15	Spain	Jesús Pastor Sahuquillo and Ruth Miró Salvador	Arrayan Daraxa
1997	17 June	(Poland) Gdynia	13	Spain	Antonio Carmena San José	Angelitos Locos
1999	10 July	(France) Lyon	16	Germany	Stegli Yohan and Katja Wünsche	Cinderella
2001	23 June	(United Kingdom) London	18	Poland	David Kupinski and Marcin Kupinski	Brothers
2003	4 July	(Netherlands) Amsterdam	17	Ukraine (Note: The Eurovision Young Dancers 2003 event had three sets of first prize, one for modern dance (awarded to Sweden), one for ballet (awarded to Ukraine), and the 'Youth Jury Choice' (awarded to Czech Republic).)	Jerlin Ndudi (Ballet)	Le Corsaire
2003	4 July	(Netherlands) Amsterdam	17	Sweden	Kristina Oom and Sebastian Michanek (Modern dance)	Light Beings
2003	4 July	(Netherlands) Amsterdam	17	Czech Republic	Monika Hejduková and Viktor Konvalinka (Youth Jury Choice)	The Twilight Of Innocence
2005	24 June	(Poland) Warsaw	13	Netherlands	Milou Nuyens	Snakesense
2011	24 June	(Norway) Oslo	10	Norway	Daniel Sarr	Full Force
2013	14 June	(Poland) Gdańsk	10	Netherlands	Sedrig Verwoert	The 5th Element
2015	19 June	(Czech Republic) Plzeň	10	Poland	Viktoria Nowak	Piece in Old Style
2017	16 December	(Czech Republic) Prague	8	Poland	Paulina Bidzińska	La Certa
2019	Cancelled (Note: At the time of cancellation, the broadcasters from Malta and Poland were the only eligible participants to have confirmed their intention to participate in the contest.)		2	Cancelled		

=== By country ===
Map showing each country's number of Young Dancers wins up to and including 2017

The table below shows the top-three placings from each contest, along with the years that a country won the contest.

Country	1st place, gold medalist(s)	2nd place, silver medalist(s)	3rd place, bronze medalist(s)	Total	Years won
Spain	5	0	1	6	1985; 1991; 1993; 1995; 1997
Poland	3	1	0	4	2001; 2015; 2017
Netherlands	2	0	1	3	2005; 2013
Sweden	1	2	2	5	2003
France	1	1	1	3	1989
Germany	1	1	1	3	1999
Norway	1	1	0	2	2011
Denmark	1	0	1	2	1987
Czech Republic	1	0	0	1	2003
United Kingdom	1	0	0	1	1989
Ukraine	1	0	0	1	2003
Slovenia	0	3	0	3	—N/a
Belgium	0	2	2	4	—N/a
Switzerland	0	2	0	2	—N/a
Austria	0	0	1	1	—N/a

== See also ==
- List of countries in the Eurovision Song Contest
- List of countries in the Junior Eurovision Song Contest
- List of countries in Eurovision Young Musicians
- List of countries in the Eurovision Dance Contest
- List of countries in Eurovision Choir
