= Eurovision Young Dancers =

Biennial dance showcase

- Also known as: Eurovision Competition for Young Dancers
- Genre: Dance competition
- Created by: European Broadcasting Union
- Presented by: Various presenters
- Countries of origin: Various participating countries
- Original language: English
- No. of episodes: 15 contests

Production
- Production location: Various host cities
- Running time: 90 minutes (2011–2017)
- Production companies: European Broadcasting Union; Various national broadcasters

Original release
- Release: 16 June 1985 – 24 June 2005
- Release: 24 June 2011 – 16 December 2017

Related
- Eurovision Young Musicians

Eurovision Young Dancers (French: L'Eurovision des Jeunes Danseurs), often shortened to EYD, or Young Dancers, was a biennial dance competition, organised by the European Broadcasting Union (EBU) between members of the union, who participate representing their countries. Broadcasters from thirty-seven countries have taken part since the first contest in 1985. (Note: Including Radio Television of Kosovo (RTK) from Kosovo (a non-EBU member) and Canadian Broadcasting Corporation (CBC/Radio-Canada) from Canada (an EBU associate member at the time).) Some participating broadcasters held national selections to choose its representative for the contest.

Performers between the ages of 16 and 21 appointed by the participating broadcasters, compete as solo or couples to dance routines of their choice. Professional jury members each representing the elements of ballet, contemporary, and modern dancing, score each of the performances. The two participants which receive the most overall points advance to a televised 'dance-off' final, where the winner is decided by the jury.

Spain is the most successful country in the competition, having won five times: 1985, 1991, 1993, 1995, and 1997, but has never hosted. On 16 December 2017, the fifteenth and most recent edition took place in Prague, Czech Republic, and was won by Paulina Bidzińska representing Poland, with Patricija Crnkovič representing Slovenia placing second (runner-up).

== History ==
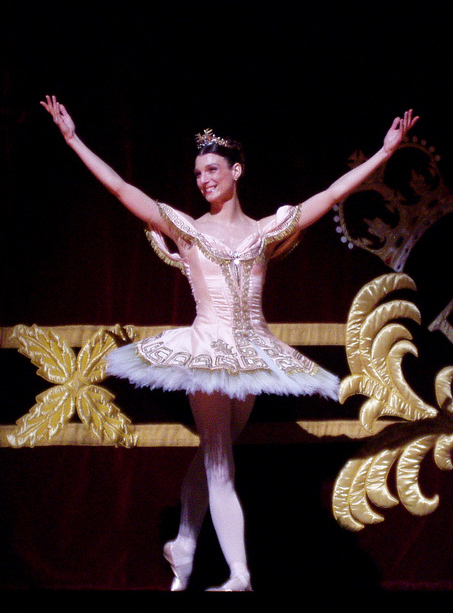
French-born ballet dancer Zenaida Yanowsky won the fifth contest for Spain in 1993.

The European Broadcasting Union (EBU) holds two biennial youth competitions in alternate years, with Eurovision Young Dancers taking place in odd-numbered years and Eurovision Young Musicians in even-numbered years. The inaugural Eurovision Young Dancers contest –then known as Eurovision Competition for Young Dancers–, took place in Reggio Emilia, Italy, on 16 June 1985. EBU member broadcasters from twelve countries competed in the first contest. Spain won that first edition, with Arantxa Argüelles. Norway with Arne Fagerholt, and Sweden with Mia Stagh and Göran Svalberg, came second and third respectively.

Broadcasters from a total of thirty-seven countries have competed at least once since 1985. Canada is the only non-European country that has been represented in the contest (as well as the only country in the Americas to have ever participated in a Eurovision event), with their broadcaster, Canadian Broadcasting Corporation (CBC/Radio-Canada), being an associate member of the EBU at the time. Eurovision Young Dancers is also the only Eurovision event to feature a country whose broadcaster is neither a full nor associate member of the EBU, as Radio Television of Kosovo (RTK) made their sole appearance in 2011 representing Kosovo (although it has broadcast other Eurovision events for many years). Bulgaria's debut and only appearance in 1991 also marked the first participation of a former Warsaw Pact country in a Eurovision event, as well as the longest gap between a country's debut at another Eurovision event prior to appearing at the Eurovision Song Contest (with fourteen years separating their Young Dancers debut and their Song Contest debut), until Canada's own Eurovision Song Contest début thirty-eight years after their last Young Dancers appearance.

In the entire history of the event, only three contests (2007, 2009 and 2019) have never occurred. Eurovision Young Dancers 2007 would have taken place at the Palais de Beaulieu in Lausanne, Switzerland on 4 February 2007 in collaboration with the Prix de Lausanne, a similar event organised by Swiss broadcaster SRG SSR idée suisse that is held annually at the same venue. The decision to cancel the contest was mutually agreed between the host broadcaster and the EBU. The following contest was due to be held on 19 June 2009 at the Dance House in Oslo, however was eventually cancelled due to a lack of interest from broadcasters, who were then subject to severe budget restrictions as a result of the 2008 financial crisis. In contrast to previous editions, the contest would have focused on modern dance styles. Norway and Romania were the only countries to have confirmed their intention to participate; the latter had intended to organise a national selection in Bucharest to choose its entrant. The contest would eventually be held again in 2011 when the format was revived as a prime time show.

On 23 January 2017, the EBU announced that Maltese broadcaster Public Broadcasting Services (PBS), who agreed to host the event in July 2015, had been forced to cancel their staging of the competition. The EBU also stated it was looking for another host broadcaster but should one not be found in time the competition would not take place this year and is expected to return in 2019. On 18 May 2017, Czech broadcaster Česká televize (ČT) confirmed that they would host the contest for a second time.

On 20 December 2018, the contest was cancelled due to the absence of a broadcaster willing to host the competition. As of that time, Malta and Poland were the only eligible countries to have confirmed their intention to participate in the contest. In October 2020, the EBU ruled out bringing the contest back until further notice; this was reaffirmed in January 2026.

== Format ==
The generic logo used for the 2011, 2013 and 2015 editions of the contest.

The format has been roughly the same since the 1985 inauguration of the competition. All competing dancers are to be non-professional and between the ages of 16–21. Participants may consist of solo or couples, with each performing a dance routine of their choice, which they have prepared in advance of the competition. All of the acts then take part in a choreographed group dance during 'Young Dancers Week'.

From 1989 to 2003, a semi-final round took place a few days before the contest, and the jury decided as well which countries qualified for the televised final. In the 2003 contest, the professional jury voted electronically, immediately following each act, awarding points for technique and artistry. For the 2005 contest, the traditional format was changed. A week of dance master classes replaced the semi-final round. Florence Clerc, Irek Mukhamedov, Christopher Bruce and Piotr Nardelli were the dance teachers selected to work with the participants and tasked to select the ten finalists out of the 13 participating countries.

In 1989 and 2003, the contest awarded two sets of first prize, one for classical and one for contemporary dance. Two jury's special prizes were also handed out in 1989 and an additional "Youth Jury" prize was awarded in 2003, chosen by a panel of dance enthusiasts in the audience.

The format was revamped in 2011 to include a 'final duel' round and the semi-finals are removed due to the low number of participating countries. Jury members of a professional aspect and representing the elements of ballet, contemporary, and modern dancing styles, score each of the competing individual and group dance routines. Once all the jury votes have been counted, the two participants which received the highest total of points progress to a final round. The final round consists of a 90-second 'dual', were each of the finalists perform a 45-second random dance-off routine. The overall winner upon completion of the final dances is chosen by the professional jury members.

== Participation ==
Participation since 1985: Entered at least once Never entered, although eligible to do so Competed as a part of another country (Yugoslavia), but never as a sovereign nation

Eligible participants include primarily active member broadcasters (as opposed to associate members) of the EBU. Active members are located in countries that fall within the European Broadcasting Area, or are member states of the Council of Europe.

The European Broadcasting Area is defined by the International Telecommunication Union:

The "European Broadcasting Area" is bounded on the west by the western boundary of Region 1, on the east by the meridian 40° East of Greenwich and on the south by the parallel 30° North so as to include the northern part of Saudi Arabia and that part of those countries bordering the Mediterranean within these limits. In addition, Armenia, Azerbaijan, Georgia and those parts of the territories of Iraq, Jordan, Syrian Arab Republic, Turkey and Ukraine lying outside the above limits are included in the European Broadcasting Area. (Note: The European Broadcasting Area was expanded in November 2007 by the World Radiocommunication Conference (WRC-07), also to include Armenia, Azerbaijan and Georgia.)

The western boundary of Region 1 is defined by a line running from the North Pole along meridian 10° West of Greenwich to its intersection with parallel 72° North; thence by great circle arc to the intersection of meridian 50° West and parallel 40° North; thence by great circle arc to the intersection of meridian 20° West and parallel 10° South; thence along meridian 20° West to the South Pole.

Active members are broadcasting organisations whose transmissions are made available to at least 98% of households in their own country which are equipped to receive such transmissions. If an EBU active member broadcaster wishes to participate, it must fulfil conditions as laid down by the rules of the contest (of which a separate copy is drafted annually).

Eligibility to participate is not determined by geographic inclusion within the continent of Europe, despite the "Euro" in "Eurovision" – nor does it have any relation to the European Union. Kosovo, a partially recognised state in Southeastern Europe, is the only country in Europe who does not yet have EBU members, but has participated once in 2011. Several countries geographically outside the boundaries of Europe have competed: Cyprus and Armenia, in Western Asia (both are members of the Council of Europe with Cyprus as a member state of the European Union). Each made their début at Young Dancers in 1989 and 2013 respectively. In addition, several transcontinental countries with only part of their territory in Europe have competed: Russia, since 1995; and Canada in North America twice, in 1987 and 1989.

Broadcasters from thirty-six countries have participated at least once. These are listed here alongside the year in which they made their début:

Year	Country making its début entry
1985	Belgium; Denmark; Finland; France; Germany; Italy; Norway; Netherlands; Spain; Sweden; Switzerland; United Kingdom
1987	Austria; Canada; Yugoslavia
1989	Cyprus; Portugal
1991	Bulgaria
1993	Estonia; Greece; Poland; Slovenia
1995	Hungary; Russia
1997	Latvia; Slovakia
1999	Czech Republic
2001	Ireland; Ukraine
2003	Armenia; Romania
2011	Croatia; Kosovo
2013	Belarus
2015	Albania; Malta

== Hosting ==
Most of the expenses of the contest are covered by commercial sponsors, the host broadcaster, and contributions from the other participating broadcasters. The contest is considered to be a unique opportunity for promoting the host country as a tourist destination. The table below shows a list of cities and venues that have hosted Eurovision Young Dancers, one or more times. Future venues are shown in italics. With three contests, Poland is the country having hosted the most editions.

Host cities of Eurovision Young Dancers: A single contest / Multiple contests

Contests	Country	City	Venue	Years
3	Poland	Gdynia	Teatr Muzyczny	1997
3	Poland	Warsaw	National Theatre	2005
3	Poland	Gdańsk	Baltic State Opera	2013
2	Czech Republic	Plzeň	New Theatre	2015
2	Czech Republic	Prague	Congress Centre	2017
2	France	Paris	Palais des Congrès	1989
2	France	Lyon	Opéra de Lyon	1999
1	Italy	Reggio Emilia	Teatro Municipale	1985
1	Germany	Schwetzingen	Schwetzingen Palace Theatre	1987
1	Finland	Helsinki	Helsinki City Theatre	1991
1	Sweden	Stockholm	Dance House	1993
1	Switzerland (Note: Eurovision Young Dancers 2007 would have taken place in Lausanne on 4 February 2007. However, the competition was cancelled in a mutual decision between the European Broadcasting Union and Swiss broadcaster SRG SSR idée suisse, who both collaborated on the production of a similar dance competition, Prix de Lausanne, held in Lausanne. If the contest had taken place, then Lausanne and Switzerland would have hosted twice.)	Lausanne	Palais de Beaulieu	1995
1	United Kingdom	London	Linbury Studio Theatre	2001
1	Netherlands	Amsterdam	Stadsschouwburg	2003
1	Norway	Oslo	Dance House	2011

== Winners ==
Sixteen performances have won the Eurovision Young Dancers competition. There have been fourteen editions, with each having a winner, second, and third places for all dance styles combined, with exception to the 1989 edition which awarded first place for contemporary and classical dance categories; and the 2003 edition which gave first place prizes for ballet, modern dance, and a 'Youth Jury Choice' categories. From 2011 onwards, there have only been prizes awarded to the winner and runner-up. Below is a breakdown of those winners, by individual event and number of wins per country.

=== Winners by year ===
Year	Date	Host city	No.	Winner(s)	Performer(s)	Dance
1985	16 June	(Italy) Reggio Emilia	12	Spain	Arantxa Argüelles	Unknown
1987	31 May	(Germany) Schwetzingen	14	Denmark	Rose Gad Poulsen and Nikolaj Hübbe	Divertissement from La Sylphide
1989	28 June	(France) Paris	17	France (Note: The Eurovision Young Dancers 1989 event had two sets of first prize, one for contemporary dance (awarded to France) and one for classical dance (awarded to United Kingdom).)	Agnès Letestu (Contemporary dance)	Grand pas classique Notre Dame de Paris
1989	28 June	(France) Paris	17	United Kingdom	Tetsuya Kumakawa (Classical ballet)	Don Quixote Kolya's variation
1991	5 June	(Finland) Helsinki	15	Spain	Amaya Iglesias	Variations from La Grisi
1993	15 June	(Sweden) Stockholm	15	Spain	Zenaida Yanowsky	Esmeralda
1995	6 June	(Switzerland) Lausanne	15	Spain	Jesús Pastor Sahuquillo and Ruth Miró Salvador	Arrayan Daraxa
1997	17 June	(Poland) Gdynia	13	Spain	Antonio Carmena San José	Angelitos Locos
1999	10 July	(France) Lyon	16	Germany	Stegli Yohan and Katja Wünsche	Cinderella
2001	23 June	(United Kingdom) London	18	Poland	David Kupinski and Marcin Kupinski	Brothers
2003	4 July	(Netherlands) Amsterdam	17	Ukraine (Note: The Eurovision Young Dancers 2003 event had three sets of first prize, one for modern dance (awarded to Sweden), one for ballet (awarded to Ukraine), and the 'Youth Jury Choice' (awarded to Czech Republic).)	Jerlin Ndudi (Ballet)	Le Corsaire
2003	4 July	(Netherlands) Amsterdam	17	Sweden	Kristina Oom and Sebastian Michanek (Modern dance)	Light Beings
2003	4 July	(Netherlands) Amsterdam	17	Czech Republic	Monika Hejduková and Viktor Konvalinka (Youth Jury Choice)	The Twilight Of Innocence
2005	24 June	(Poland) Warsaw	13	Netherlands	Milou Nuyens	Snakesense
2011	24 June	(Norway) Oslo	10	Norway	Daniel Sarr	Full Force
2013	14 June	(Poland) Gdańsk	10	Netherlands	Sedrig Verwoert	The 5th Element
2015	19 June	(Czech Republic) Plzeň	10	Poland	Viktoria Nowak	Piece in Old Style
2017	16 December	(Czech Republic) Prague	8	Poland	Paulina Bidzińska	La Certa

=== Winners by country ===
Map showing each country's number of Young Dancers wins up to and including 2017

The table below shows the top-three placings from each contest, along with the years that a country won the contest.

Country	1st place, gold medalist(s)	2nd place, silver medalist(s)	3rd place, bronze medalist(s)	Total	Years won
Spain	5	0	1	6	1985; 1991; 1993; 1995; 1997
Poland	3	1	0	4	2001; 2015; 2017
Netherlands	2	0	2	4	2005; 2013
Sweden	1	2	2	5	2003
France	1	1	1	3	1989
Germany	1	1	1	3	1999
Norway	1	1	0	2	2011
Denmark	1	0	1	2	1987
Czech Republic	1	0	0	1	2003
United Kingdom	1	0	0	1	1989
Ukraine	1	0	0	1	2003
Slovenia	0	3	0	3	—N/a
Belgium	0	2	2	4	—N/a
Switzerland	0	2	0	2	—N/a
Romania	0	1	0	1	—N/a
Austria	0	0	1	1	—N/a
Estonia	0	0	1	1	—N/a

== Presenters ==
Year	Presenter(s)	Backstage host
1985	Carla Fracci and Gheorghe Iancu	Not present
1987	Margot Werner	Not present
1989	Zizi Jeanmaire and Alain Duault	Not present
1991	Taina Elg and Heikki Värtsi	Not present
1993	Anneli Alhanko and John Chrispinsson	Not present
1995	Géraldine Chaplin and Jean-Pierre Pastori	Not present
1997	Grażyna Torbicka and Bogusław Kaczyński (semi-final); Grażyna Torbicka and Henk van der Meulen (final)	Not present
1999	Alex Taylor	Not present
2001	Deborah Bull	Not present
2003	Aldith Hunkar	Not present
2005	Agata Konarska	Not present
2011	Erik Solbakken	Not present
2013	Tomasz Kammel	Michael Nunn and William Trevitt
2015	Libor Bouček	Cameron McMillan
2017	Libor Bouček	Angeé Roučková
