= Eurovision Young Dancers 2015 =

International youth dance competition

Date and venue
- Final: 19 June 2015
- Venue: New Theatre; Plzeň, Czech Republic

Organisation
- Organiser: European Broadcasting Union (EBU)
- Executive supervisor: Vladislav Yakovlev

Production
- Host broadcaster: Česká televize (ČT)
- Director: Michael Cech
- Executive producer: Vítězslav Sýkora
- Presenters: Libor Bouček; Cameron McMillan (backstage)

Participants
- Number of entries: 10
- Debuting countries: Albania; Malta
- Returning countries: Slovakia
- Non-returning countries: Armenia; Belarus; Ukraine
- Participation map: frameless}} Participating countries Did not qualify to the final round Countries that participated in the past but not in 2015

Vote
- Voting system: Three professional juries choose the top 2 performances, and after the final battle, they choose the winning dancer.
- Winning dancers: Poland; Viktoria Nowak

Eurovision Young Dancers 2015 was the 14th edition of Eurovision Young Dancers, held on 19 June 2015 at the New Theatre in Plzeň, Czech Republic, and presented by Libor Bouček. It was organised by the European Broadcasting Union (EBU) and host broadcaster Česká televize (ČT).

Dancers representing ten countries took part in the competition; with Albania and Malta making their début; Slovakia returning after an eighteen-year break; and Armenia, Belarus, and Ukraine deciding not to participate.

The event is aimed at young dancers aged between 16 and 21, competing in modern dances, be it solo or in couples, as long as they were not professionally engaged.

Viktoria Nowak representing Poland won the contest, with Staša Tušar representing Slovenia placing second (runner-up).

== Location ==
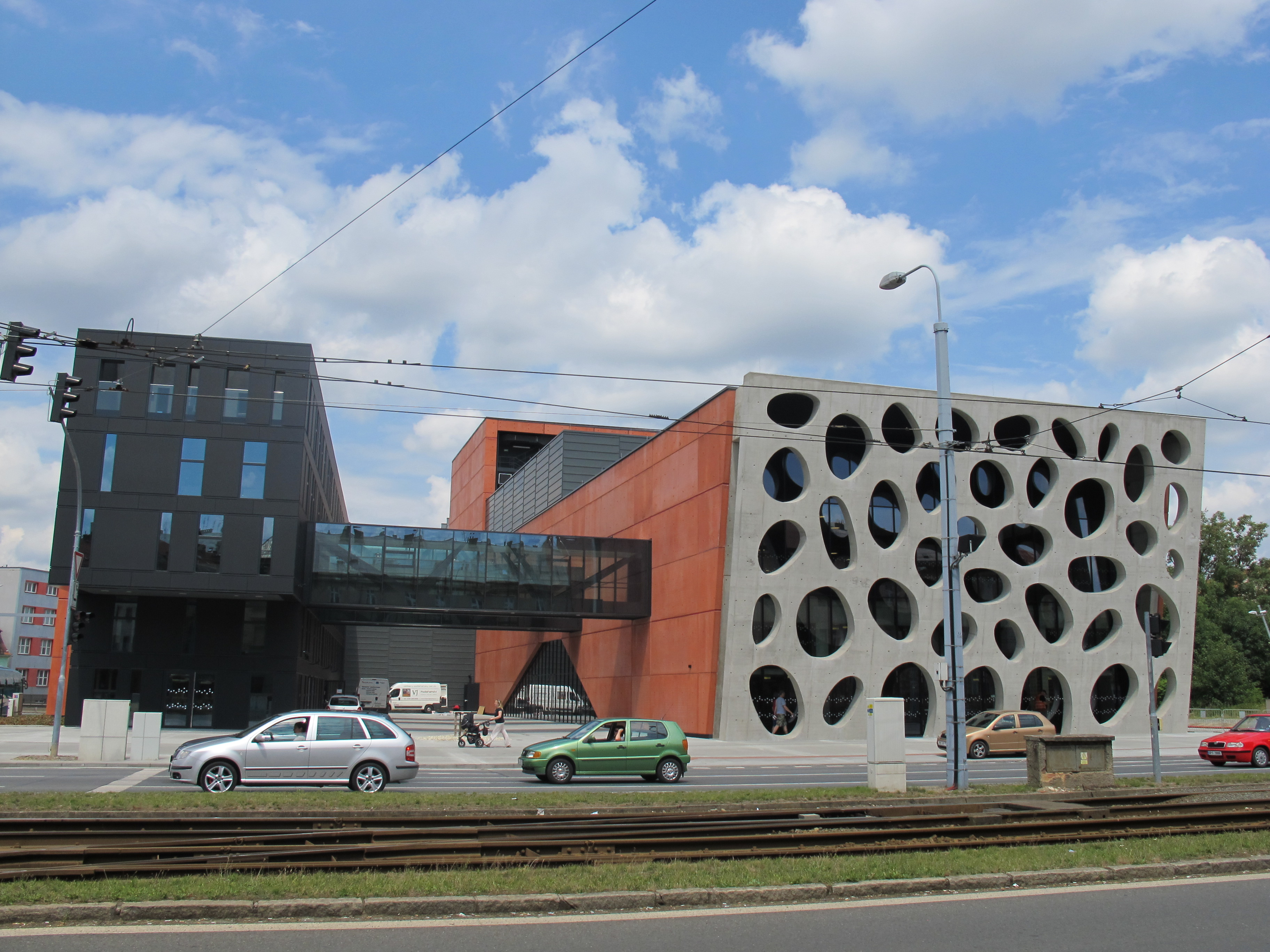
New Theatre, Plzeň. Venue for 2015.

On 24 April 2014, the Czech city of Plzeň, was selected as the host city for the 2015 edition of the biennial Eurovision Young Dancers. The reasons behind this decision was to coincide the Young Dancers event alongside the European Capital of Culture, of which the city were organisers of a series of cultural events with a strong European dimension.

In November 2014, the host broadcaster, Česká televize (ČT), announced that it had selected the New Theatre as the venue for the contest. The building first opened on 1 September 2014, showcasing a performance of Bedřich Smetana's The Bartered Bride, and has "state of the art" technology for a theatre of its kind. The 2015 Eurovision Young Dancers took place on 19 June 2015.

== Format ==
The format consisted of dancers who were non-professional and between the ages of 16–21, competing in a performance of dance routines of their choice, which they had prepared in advance of the competition. All of the acts then took part in a choreographed group dance during 'Young Dancers Week'.

=== Presenters ===
On 10 March 2015, host broadcaster ČT, announced that Libor Bouček had been chosen to host the 2015 edition. Bouček, who is a well-known television presenter, speaks fluent Czech and English, and has experience with hosting live events, with his most recent being the 2014 European Athletics Championships. Česká televize, stated that his repertoire is why they decided to choose him to host the contest. Cameron McMillan, head choreographer and 2013 jury panel member, presented the backstage segments during the show.

== Jury panel ==
Jury members of a professional aspect and representing the elements of ballet, contemporary, and modern dancing styles, score each of the competing individual and group dance routines. Once all the jury votes had been counted, the two participants which received the highest total of points progress to a final round. The final round consisted of a 90-second 'dual', where each of the finalists performed a 45-second random dance-off routine. The overall winner upon completion of the final dances was chosen by the professional jury members. The jury members were as follows:

- Canada – Alexandra ‘Spicey’ Landé
- Czech Republic – Jiří Bubeníček
- Spain – Zenaida Yanowsky (winner of Eurovision Young Dancers 1993)

== Participants and results ==
The contest was limited to a maximum of fourteen participants, however, only broadcasters from ten countries confirmed their participation. Of those ten participants, Albania and Malta made their début; Slovakia returned after last competing at Eurovision Young Dancers 1997. Armenia, Belarus, and Ukraine withdrew.

R/O	Country	Broadcaster	Dancer(s)	Dance	Choreographer	Result
1	Slovenia	RTVSLO	Staša Tušar	Gardenfound	Tanja Pavlič	Advanced
2	Norway	NRK	Trine Lise Moe	Flux	Masja Abrahamsen	—N/a
3	Slovakia	RTVS	Valéria Stašková	La Esmeralda	Marius Petipa, Karin Alaverdjan	—N/a
4	Malta	PBS	Anthea Zammit	Tiċrita - Tear Apart	Dorian Mallia	—N/a
5	Netherlands	NTR	Thijs Hogenboom (Note: Hogenboom was announced as a late replacement for Timothy van Poucke, who was injured prior to the contest)	Variation of the Male Flame	Thom Stuart	—N/a
6	Poland	TVP	Viktoria Nowak	Piece in Old Style	Jacek Przybyłowicz	Advanced
7	Albania	RTSH	Klaudio Begaj	Scream of Life	Arjan Sukniqi	—N/a
8	Sweden	SVT	Agnes Klapp	L’après midi	Mia Stagh	—N/a
9	Germany	WDR	Thomas Rohe	Senses	Thomas Rohe	—N/a
10	Czech Republic	ČT	Helena Nováčková	Soldier On My Own	Jana Kovačević Spiessová	—N/a

=== Final duel ===
Country	Participant	Dance	Jury members votes			Result
Country	Participant	Dance	Z. Yanowsky	J. Bubeníček	A. Landé	Result
Slovenia	Staša Tušar	Gardenfound	X			Runner up
Poland	Viktoria Nowak	Piece in Old Style		X	X	Winner

== Broadcasting ==
The following countries, listed in order of broadcasting dates, confirmed that they would broadcast the contest.

Date of broadcast	Country	Station
19 June 2015	Albania	TVSH
19 June 2015	Albania	TVSH2
19 June 2015	Albania	RTSH HD
19 June 2015	Albania	RTSH Muzikë
19 June 2015	Albania	RTSH Art
19 June 2015	Czech Republic	ČT2
19 June 2015	Norway	NRK1
19 June 2015	Poland	TVP Kultura
19 June 2015	Rest of the world	www.youngdancers.tv
19 June 2015	Slovakia	RTVS2
19 June 2015	Malta	TVM1 (1-hour delay)
20 June 2015	Sweden	SVT2
28 June 2015	Netherlands	NPO 2
28 June 2015	Slovenia	TV SLO 2
12 July 2015	Germany	WDR Fernsehen

== Other countries ==
For a country to be eligible for potential participation in Eurovision Young Dancers, it must be member of the European Broadcasting Union (EBU). The EBU issued an invitation of participation for the 2015 Contest to all 56 active members. Ten countries confirmed their participation, whilst the following countries declined, stating their reasons as shown below.

=== Members ===
- Armenia – On 30 January 2015, the Armenian broadcaster Public Television of Armenia (ARMTV) announced that they would withdraw from the competition. Armenia last competed at Eurovision Young Dancers 2013 event.
- Belarus – On 26 February 2015, the Belarusian broadcaster Belarusian Television and Radio Company (BTRC) announced that they would withdraw from the event, after last competing at the 2013 event.
- Belgium – The Flemish broadcaster Vlaamse Radio- en Televisieomroeporganisatie (VRT) announced on 3 December 2014 that they had no plans to return in 2015. Belgium last took part in 2005, although they had broadcast the 2013 event.
- Croatia – The Croatian broadcaster Croatian Radiotelevision (HRT), who last participated at Eurovision Young Dancers 2011, announced on 30 January 2015 that they would not take part in the 2015 event.
- Cyprus – The Cypriot broadcaster Cyprus Broadcasting Corporation (CyBC) announced on 5 December 2014 that a decision on participation had yet to be taken, making a return to the 2015 event possible. The island country, who last participated at Eurovision Young Dancers 2005, did not make their return in the end.
- Finland – The Finnish broadcaster Yleisradio (Yle) announced on 10 December 2014 that they were unable to take part in the 2015 event. Finland last took part in 2005.
- Ireland – On 28 November 2014, the Irish broadcaster Raidió Teilifís Éireann (RTÉ) announced that they had no plans to return to the event in 2015, after last taking part in 2001.
- Latvia – On 5 March 2015, the Latvian broadcaster Latvijas Televīzija (LTV) announced that they would not take part in the 2015 event. Latvia last participated at the 2005 Young Dancers event.
- Ukraine – On 19 February 2015 it was confirmed that the Ukrainian broadcaster National Television Company of Ukraine (NTU), who last took part at the 2013 Eurovision Young Dancers, hadn't made any decisions on participating in the Junior Eurovision Song Contest 2015 and Eurovision Young Dancers 2015 due to their current financial and political situations and their focus on the creation of a public service broadcaster.
- United Kingdom – On 2 October 2014 the British Broadcasting Corporation (BBC) announced that they were to launch a new dancing competition in 2015 entitled "BBC Young Dancer", and it was thought that the winner would represent the United Kingdom, marking a potential return to Eurovision Young Dancers, since their last participation in 2005. On 7 October 2014, the BBC replied to a post on the show's Facebook page saying there were "no plans at present" to return in 2015.

== See also ==
- European Capital of Culture
- Eurovision Song Contest 2015
- Eurovision Young Dancers
- Junior Eurovision Song Contest 2015
