= Eurovision Young Dancers 2017 =

International youth dance competition

Date and venue
- Final: 16 December 2017
- Venue: Congress Centre; Prague, Czech Republic

Organisation
- Organiser: European Broadcasting Union (EBU)
- Executive supervisor: Jon Ola Sand

Production
- Host broadcaster: Česká televize (ČT)
- Director: Michael Cech
- Executive producer: Vítězslav Sýkora
- Presenters: Libor Bouček; Angeé Klára Svobodová

Participants
- Number of entries: 8
- Returning countries: Portugal
- Non-returning countries: Albania; Netherlands; Slovakia
- Participation map: frameless}} Participating countries Did not qualify to the final round Countries that participated in the past but not in 2017

Vote
- Voting system: Three professional juries choose the top 2 performances, and after the final battle, they choose the winning dancer.
- Winning dancers: Poland; Paulina Bidzińska

Eurovision Young Dancers 2017 was the 15th and final edition of Eurovision Young Dancers, held on 16 December 2017 at the Prague Congress Centre in Prague, Czech Republic, and presented by Libor Bouček and Angeé Klára Svobodová. It was organised by the European Broadcasting Union (EBU), and host broadcaster Česká televize (ČT).

Dancers representing eight countries took part in the competition, with Portugal returning after last competing in 2011; and Albania, Netherlands, and Slovakia not returning this year.

The event is aimed at young dancers aged between 16 and 21, competing in modern dances, be it solo or in couples, as long as they were not professionally engaged.

Paulina Bidzińska representing Poland won the contest, with Patricija Crnkovič representing Slovenia placing second (runner-up).

== Location ==
Locations of the bidding countries. Countries which withdrew from hosting are marked in red. The chosen host country is marked in blue.

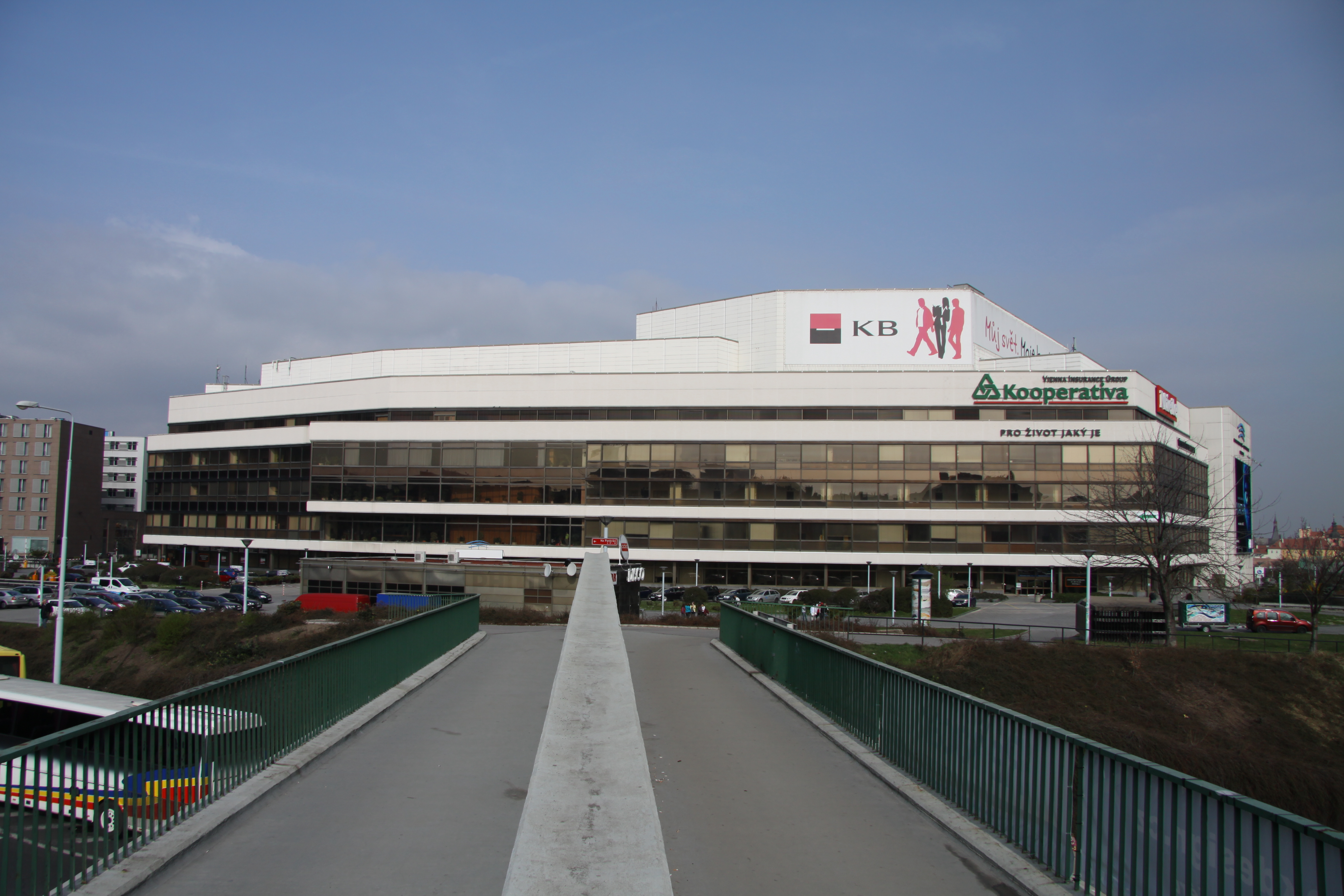
Prague Congress Centre, venue for 2017.

On 7 July 2015, the Maltese city of Valletta was selected as the host city for the 2017 edition of the biennial Eurovision Young Dancers. The reasons behind this decision was to coincide the Young Dancers event alongside the European Capital of Culture, of which the city will be the organisers of a series of cultural events in 2018, all with a strong European dimension. The contest was scheduled to take place on 9 June 2017, with the Mediterranean Conference Centre originally proposed as the venue. However, on 19 November 2016 it was reported that the host broadcaster PBS were planning to host the contest in the open-air. It was announced on 24 December 2016 that the event would take place at the Grand Harbour.

In January 2017, the EBU announced that Maltese broadcaster PBS, who agreed to host the event in July 2015, had due to circumstances beyond their control been forced to cancel their staging of the competition. The EBU also stated they were looking for another host broadcaster but should one not be found in time the competition would not take place this year and was expected to return in 2019. This would have been the third time that the Maltese national broadcaster, Public Broadcasting Services (PBS), would have organised a Eurovision event, the first two being the Junior Eurovision Song Contest in 2014 and 2016.

However, in May, during a press release about the national selection for the contest, the Polish broadcaster Telewizja Polska (TVP) confirmed that the contest would now take place in the Czech Republic later in the year. On 18 May 2017, Czech broadcaster Česká televize (ČT) confirmed that they would host the contest. It was later reported that the contest would take place on 16 December 2017. Slovenian broadcaster Radiotelevizija Slovenija (RTVSLO) confirmed that it would be held in Prague. The EBU confirmed on 22 June that the Forum Hall of the Prague Congress Centre would host the competition.

=== Hosting selection ===
Whereas the winning country at the Eurovision Song Contest goes on to host the following year's event, this method is not the case when it comes to the decision of selecting the hosts for Eurovision Young Dancers. The event's Steering Group, conduct a meeting in which they discuss the countries who submitted an application to host the event, and make their final decision thereafter.

== Format ==
The format consisted of dancers who were non-professional and between the ages of 16–21, competing in a performance of dance routines of their choice, which they had prepared in advance of the competition. All of the acts then took part in a choreographed group dance during 'Young Dancers Week'.

=== Jury panel ===
Jury members of a professional aspect and representing the elements of ballet, contemporary, and modern dancing styles, score each of the competing individual and group dance routines. Once all the jury votes have been counted, the two participants which received the highest total of points progress to a final round. The final round will involve a 90-second 'dual', were each of the finalists perform a 45-second random dance-off routine. The overall winner upon completion of the final dances will be chosen by the professional jury members. The jury members were as follows:

- Czech Republic – Daria Klimentová
- Sweden – Ambra Succi
- Israel – Itzik Galili

== Participants and results ==
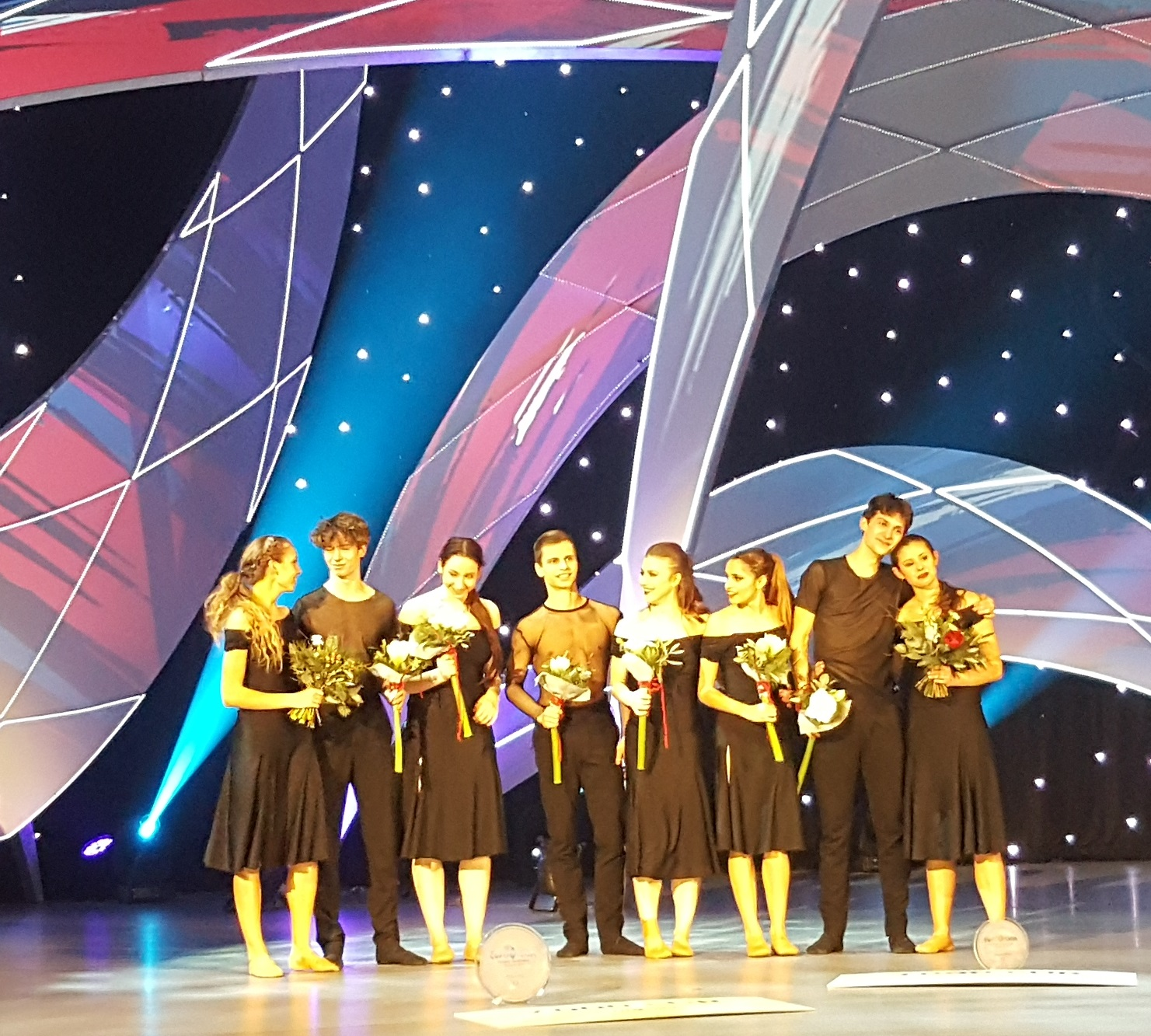
The eight finalists on stage

On 14 August 2017, it was revealed that eight countries would be taking part in the contest, with Portugal returning after last competing in 2011; and Albania, Netherlands, and Slovakia not returning. This is the lowest number of participating countries in the history of the contest.

=== Returning dancer ===
Patricija Crnkovič previously represented Slovenia in 2013, failing to advance to the final duel.

=== Results ===
R/O	Country	Broadcaster	Dancer(s)	Dance	Choreographer	Result
1	Norway	NRK	Anna Louise Amundsen	These Days	Tine Erica Aspaas	—N/a
2	Germany	WDR	Danila Kapustin	Desde Otello	Goyo Montero	—N/a
3	Malta	PBS	Denise Buttigieg	Q.W.	Joeline Tabone	—N/a
4	Portugal	RTP	Raquel Fidalgo	Esquiva	Marius Petipa	—N/a
5	Poland	TVP	Paulina Bidzińska	La Certa	Jacek Przybyłowicz	Advanced
6	Slovenia	RTVSLO	Patricija Crnkovič	Disintegration	Patricija Crnkovič	Advanced
7	Sweden	SVT	Christoffer Collins	Solo-X	Sigge Modigh	—N/a
8	Czech Republic	ČT	Michal Vach	Monologue	Michal Vach and Lenka Halašová	—N/a

=== Final duel ===
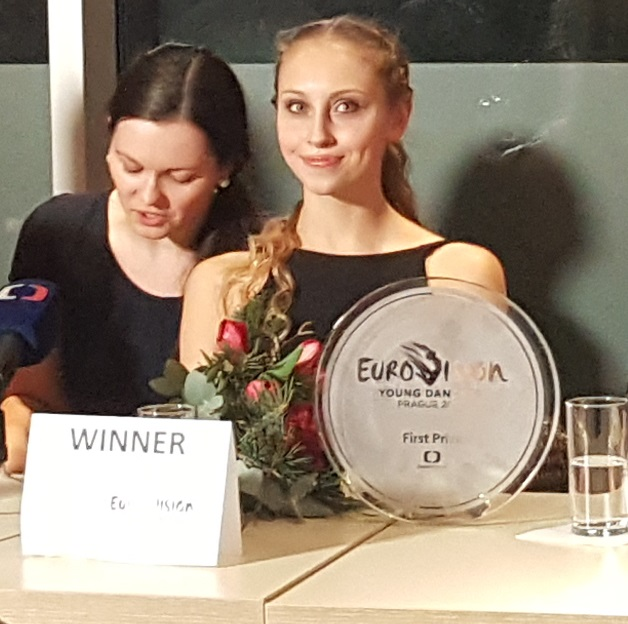
Winner, Paulina Bidzińska

Country	Participant	Dance	Result
Slovenia	Patricija Crnkovič	Disintegration	Runner up
Poland	Paulina Bidzińska	La Certa	Winner

== Broadcasting ==
The following countries, listed in order of broadcasting dates, have confirmed that they broadcast the contest.

Date of broadcast	Country	Station
16 December 2017	Albania	RTSH 1 HD
16 December 2017	Czech Republic	ČT art
16 December 2017	Malta	TVM1 (1-hour delay)
16 December 2017	Poland	TVP Kultura
16 December 2017	Portugal	RTP2 (2-hour delay)
16 December 2017	Rest of the world	YouTube
16 December 2017	Slovenia	TV SLO 2 (5-minute delay)
16 December 2017	Sweden	SVT2 and SVT Play
17 December 2017	Norway	NRK2
7 January 2018	Germany	WDR Fernsehen

== Other countries ==
For a country to be eligible for potential participation in Eurovision Young Dancers, it needs to be an active member of the European Broadcasting Union (EBU).

=== Active EBU Members ===
- Albania – Albania participated in Eurovision Young Dancers 2015, however announced that they would not participate in 2017.
- Austria – The Austrian broadcaster Österreichischer Rundfunk (ORF) announced on 22 November 2016 that they had no plans to return in 2017. Austria last participated at the 2001 Young Dancers.
- Finland – The Finnish broadcaster Yleisradio (Yle) announced on 4 November 2016 that they had no plans to return in 2017. Finland last participated at the 2005 Young Dancers.
- Latvia – The Latvian broadcaster Latvijas Televīzija (LTV) announced on 16 December 2016 that they had no plans to return in 2017. Latvia last participated at the 2005 Young Dancers.
- Netherlands – The Dutch broadcaster NTR announced on 2 February 2017 that they would not participate in the contest. The Netherlands last participated at the 2015 Young Dancers.
- Ukraine – The Ukrainian broadcaster National Television Company of Ukraine (NTU) announced on 22 December 2016 that they would not return in 2017 due to focusing their attention on preparations for hosting the Eurovision Song Contest 2017. Ukraine last participated at the 2013 Young Dancers.

== See also ==
- ABU International Dance Festival 2017
- Eurovision Choir of the Year 2017
- Eurovision Song Contest 2017
- Junior Eurovision Song Contest 2017
