= Andri Xhahu =

Albanian broadcaster (born 1987)

- Xhahu as the presenter of Mirëmëngjes fundjavë on RTSH, 2017
- Born: Andri Xhahu; 30 April 1987 (age 38); Tirana, Albania
- Occupations: Presenter, journalist
- Years active: 2003–present

Andri Xhahu (born 30 April 1987) is an Albanian television and radio presenter, journalist and editor, who works for RTSH. Since 2012, he has served as the Albanian commentator and spokesperson for the Eurovision Song Contest.

== Career ==
Xhahu began his career in 2003 hosting Koha tendencë on Radio Koha. Soon afterwards, he moved to Radio Tirana. Having become popular through the radio evening shows, he went on to host various radio shows: Nata nuk do t'ja dijë, Bisedë me zë të ulët, Deri në pikë të fundit, Hapur.

Since 2008, Xhahu has hosted the radio broadcast Gjithçka Shqip. The show airs everyday from 16.00 to 17.00 and combines a mixture of the latest Albanian music, chat and celebrity guests. In 2015, Gjithçka Shqip was nominated by Info Media Albania and won "Best showbiz programme".

Andri Xhahu wrote for magazines. As a journalist, he worked for the magazine Jeta between 2011 and 2013.

Since 2012, he has served as the Albanian commentator and spokesperson for the Eurovision Song Contest every year. In 2012 and again since 2015, Xhahu commentates on the Junior Eurovision Song Contest. Since 2013, Xhahu has commentated on the Sanremo Music Festival. In 2015, he commentated on the Eurovision Young Dancers.

== Radio and TV shows ==
- Koha tendencë (Radio Koha, 2003)
- Nata nuk do t'ja dijë (Radio Tirana, 2004–2008)
- Maratona e Këngës (Radio Tirana, 2010–2011)
- Gjithçka Shqip – (Radio Tirana and TVSH, 2008–2017)
- Anë e errët – (Radio Tirana, 2014–2015)
- Verë dhe mendim në një gotë – (Radio Tirana, 2016)
- E vërteta – (Radio Tirana, 2020)
- Identikit – (Radio Tirana, 2021)
- Në radio – (Radio Tirana, 2019–present)
- Mirëmëngjes fundjavë – (RTSH 1 and RTSH 3, 2016–2017)
- Eurovision Song Contest (Commentator and spokesperson, RTSH, 2012–present)
- Junior Eurovision Song Contest (Commentator, RTSH, 2012, 2015–present)
- Sanremo Music Festival (Commentator, RTSH, 2013–present)
- Festivali i Këngës 53 (Pop jury and backstage, 2014)
- Eurovision Young Dancers (Commentator, RTSH, 2015)
- Festivali i Këngës 55 (Host of green room and voting sequence, 2016)
- Eurovision Choir (Commentator, RTSH 1, 2017)
- Post Festival (Festivali i Këngës 57) (Host, 2018)
- Festivali i Këngës 59 (Jury member, 2020)
