= Eurovision Young Dancers 1995 =

International youth dance competition

Dates and venue
- Semi-final: 3 June 1995
- Final: 6 June 1995
- Venue: Palais de Beaulieu; Lausanne, Switzerland

Organisation
- Organiser: European Broadcasting Union (EBU)
- Host broadcaster: Swiss Broadcasting Corporation (SRG SSR)
- Presenters: Géraldine Chaplin; Jean-Pierre Pastori

Participants
- Number of entries: 15
- Number of finalists: 9
- Debuting countries: Hungary Russia
- Non-returning countries: Denmark Estonia
- Participation map: frameless}} Participating countries Did not qualify from the semi-final Countries that participated in the past but not in 1995

Vote
- Voting system: A professional jury chose the finalists and the top 3 performances
- Winning dancers: Spain; Jesús Pastor Sauquillo and Ruth Miró Salvador

Eurovision Young Dancers 1995 was the 6th edition of Eurovision Young Dancers. It consisted of a semi-final on 3 June and a final on 6 June 1995, held at Palais de Beaulieu in Lausanne, Switzerland, and presented by Géraldine Chaplin and Jean-Pierre Pastori. It was organised by the European Broadcasting Union (EBU) and host broadcaster Swiss Broadcasting Corporation (SRG SSR).

Dancers representing fifteen countries took part in the competition, with nine of them participating in the televised final. Hungary and Russia made their début while Denmark and Estonia decided not to participate. However, the Danish broadcaster DR broadcast the event as did the broadcasters in Bulgaria and Romania.

Like in the previous contests, each participating broadcaster could enter one or two dancers, male or female, not older than 19, that could perform one or two different dances: either a 2 variations (individual) no longer than 5 minutes each or a pas de deux (couples) no longer than 10 minutes.

The winner was the duo Jesús Pastor Sahuquillo and Ruth Miró Salvador representing Spain, with Nadja Sellrup representing Sweden placing second, and Jeroen Hofmans representing Belgium placing third. This was the 4th win for Spain in the competition (3rd in a row).

== Location ==
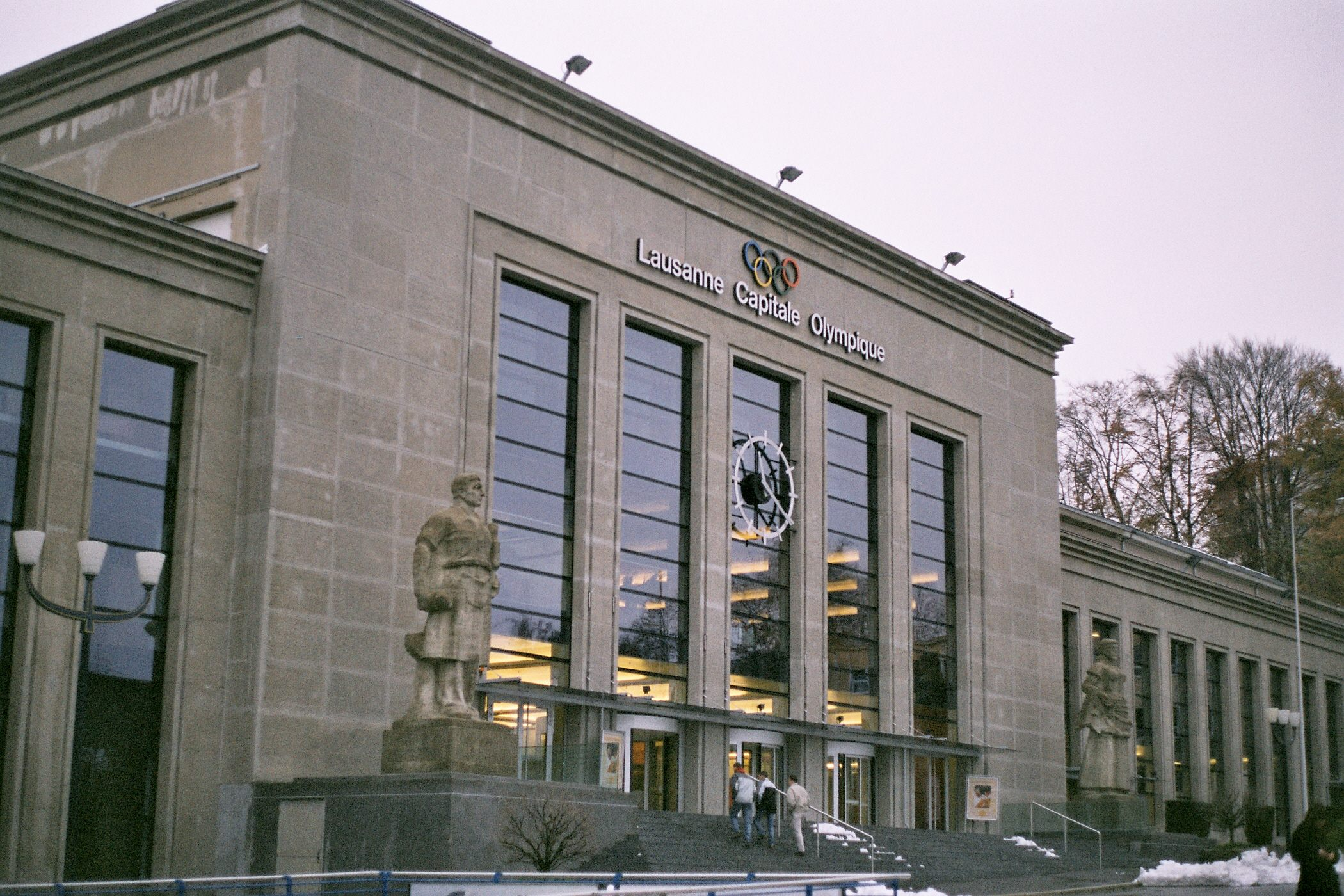
Palais de Beaulieu

Palais de Beaulieu, a convention centre in Lausanne, Switzerland, was the host venue for the 1995 edition of Eurovision Young Dancers.

The centre includes the Théâtre de Beaulieu concert, dance and theatre hall and hosted the 1989 Eurovision Song Contest. With 1,850 seats, the Théâtre de Beaulieu is the biggest theatre in Switzerland. The Prix de Lausanne, an international ballet competition, is hosted at the centre.

== Format ==
The format consists of dancers who are non-professional and between the ages of 16–21, competing in a performance of dance routines of their choice, which they have prepared in advance of the competition. All of the acts then take part in a choreographed group dance during 'Young Dancers Week'.

Jury members of a professional aspect and representing the elements of ballet, contemporary, and modern dancing styles, score each of the competing individual and group dance routines. The overall winner upon completion of the final dances is chosen by the professional jury members.

The interval act this year was Moments in a garden of Spain: a flamenco show performed by Nina Corti and her musicians.

== Participants and results ==
=== Preliminary round ===
Broadcasters from fifteen countries took part in the preliminary round of the 1995 contest, of which eight qualified to the televised grand final. The following participants failed to qualify.

Country	Broadcaster	Dancer	Dance	Choreographer
Finland	YLE	Janna Eklund	La Esmeralda: Variation de Diane	A. Vaganova
Germany	ZDF	Irina Schlaht	La Esmeralda	M. Petipa
Slovenia	RTVSLO	Damjan Mohorko	La Fille mal gardée: Variation de Colas	M. Petipa and L. Ivanov
Norway	NRK	Maria Mikalsen	Les mots sont allés	I. Bjørnsgaard
Cyprus	CyBC	Carolina Constadinou	La Esmeralda	M. Petipa
Hungary	MTV	Sara Weisz	Death	T. Juronics

=== Final ===
Awards were given to the top three participants. The table below highlights these using gold, silver, and bronze. The placing results of the remaining participants is unknown and never made public by the European Broadcasting Union.

R/O	Country	Broadcaster	Dancer(s)	Dance	Choreographer	Result
1	Greece	ERT	Franghiskos Toumbakaris	Ondine: variation acte II	J. Neumeier	
2	Poland	TVP	Filip Barankiewicz	Paquita	M. Petipa	
3	Switzerland	SRG SSR	Anne-Catherine Haller	Raymonda	M. Petipa	
4	Austria	ORF	Oliver Preiss	Taras Bulba: Gopak	R. Zakharov	
5	Russia	RTR	Maria Alexandrova	Coppélia: variation de Swanilda	M. Petipa	
6	Belgium	BRTN	Jeroen Hofmans	Giselle: variation du paysan	M. Petipa, J. Coralli and J. Perrot	3
7	France	France Télévision	Karl Paquette	La Bayadère	R. Noureev	
8	Sweden	SVT	Nadja Sellrup	Grand pas classique	V. Gsovsky	2
9	Spain	TVE	Jesús Pastor Sahuquillo and Ruth Miró Salvador	Arrayan Daraxa	V. Ullate	1

== Jury members ==
The jury members consisted of the following:

- Switzerland – Heinz Spoerli (Head of Jury)
- France/Switzerland – Maurice Béjart (Honorary guest of the Jury)
- Argentina/Switzerland – Oscar Araiz
- Romania/France – Gigi Căciuleanu
- Italy – Paola Cantalupo
- Germany – Peter Van Dyk
- Brazil/Switzerland – Beatriz Consuelo
- Spain – Víctor Ullate
- Switzerland – Gilbert Mayer
- France – Pierre Lacotte
- Hungary – Youri Vámos
- Finland – Jorma Uotinen

== Broadcasting ==
The 1995 Young Dancers competition was broadcast in 18 countries. Bulgaria, Denmark, and Romania broadcast the contest in addition to the competing countries. Known details on the broadcasts in each country, including the specific broadcasting stations and commentators are shown in the tables below.

Country	Broadcaster	Channel(s)	Commentator(s)	Ref(s)
Austria	ORF	ORF 2 (Note: Delayed broadcast in a shortened format on 17 June at 15:15 (CET))		
Belgium	RTBF	Télé 21		
Belgium	BRTN			
Cyprus	CyBC			
Finland	YLE	TV1	Leif Nystén and Heikki Värtsi	
France	France Télévision	France 3 (Note: Delayed broadcast, in a shortened format; contest featured as part of the programme Musique Graffiti from 4 November to 2 December)		
Germany	ZDF (Note: Delayed broadcast in a shortened format on 7 June at 00:00 (CET))			
Germany	3sat (Note: Delayed broadcast in a shortened format on 29 October at 15:45 (CET))			
Greece	ERT			
Hungary	MTV	M2 (Note: Deferred broadcast on 1 July at 22:20 (CET))		
Norway	NRK	NRK Fjernsynet (Note: Deferred broadcast on 13 June at 22:45 (CET))		
Poland	TVP	TVP2		
Russia	RTR			
Slovenia	RTVSLO			
Spain	TVE			
Sweden	SVT	SVT1 (Note: Deferred broadcast at 22:30 (CET))	Niklas Lindblad	
Switzerland	SRG SSR	Schweiz 4, Suisse 4		

Broadcasters in non-participating countries
Country	Broadcaster	Channel(s)	Commentator(s)	Ref(s)
Bulgaria	BNT			
Denmark	DR	DR TV	Niels Oxenvad	
Romania	TVR			

== See also ==
- Eurovision Song Contest 1995
