= Deborah Bull =

English life peer, former dancer, writer and broadcaster (born 1963)

The Right Honourable The Baroness Bull CBE
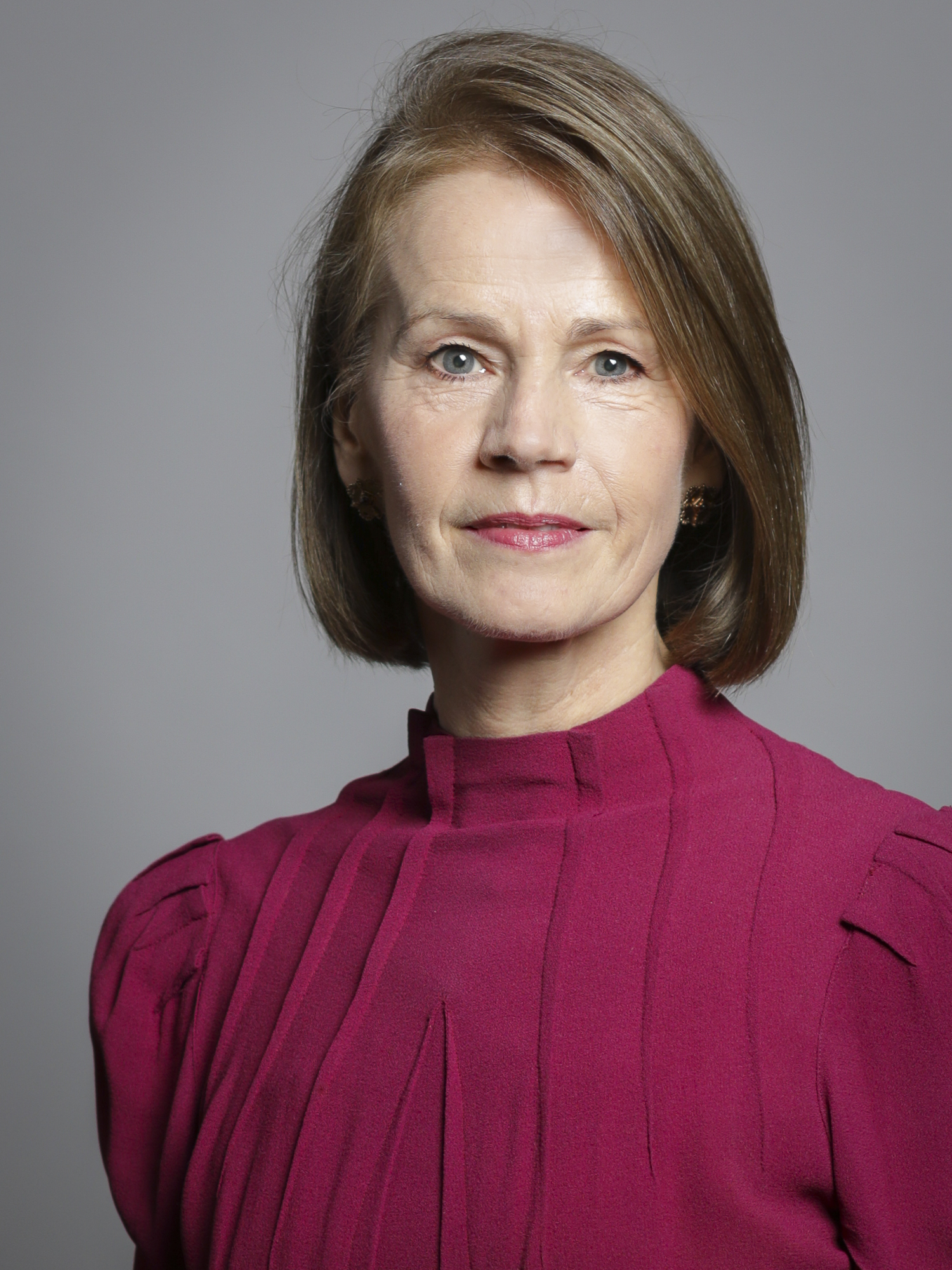
- Official portrait, 2019

Member of the House of Lords
- Lord Temporal
- Life peerage 11 July 2018

Personal details
- Born: 22 March 1963 (age 63) Derby, England
- Party: Crossbench
- Education: Royal Ballet School
- Occupation: Ballet dancer; writer; broadcaster; creative director

Deborah Clare Bull, Baroness Bull, CBE (born 22 March 1963), is an English dancer, writer, and broadcaster, and former creative director of the Royal Opera House. She joined King's College London as Director, Cultural Partnerships in 2012. In 2015 she was appointed as the university's Assistant Principal (London), in 2018 was named Vice President & Vice-Principal (London) and in 2021 named Vice Principal (Communities & National Engagement) until her departure in July 2022.

== Early life ==
Born in Derby, and brought up in Kent and Lincolnshire, she studied dance from the age of seven, first locally, and then at the Royal Ballet School. Whilst at the school she won the 1980 Prix de Lausanne, the prestigious international ballet competition.

== Ballet career ==
She was invited to join The Royal Ballet in 1981, having toured with the company as a student during the summer. The teachers that Bull identified as the "resident teachers" were Brian Shaw, Alexander Agadzhanov, Betty Anderton and the Norwegian Gerd Larsen. Bull particularly admired Larsen's ability to introduce mime. Bull gained principal status in 1992, after the company's opening performance in Japan at which she danced the role of Gamzatti in La Bayadère.

During her 20 years in the Royal Ballet, she danced a wide range of work throughout the repertoire. Her leading roles in the classics included Odette/Odile in Swan Lake, Aurora in The Sleeping Beauty and Kitri in Don Quixote, and she created roles for Ashley Page, David Bintley, Michael Corder, Emma Diamond, Wayne McGregor, Glen Tetley and Twyla Tharp. She received particular praise for her performances in the works of George Balanchine and William Forsythe. In 1995, Forsythe staged for her the first performance in the UK of his ballet Steptext, and she was subsequently nominated for a 1996 Olivier Award in the 'Outstanding Achievement in Dance' Category for her interpretation. She was named as 1996 Dancer of the Year by both The Sunday Express and The Independent on Sunday, who praised her work on and off the stage, saying 'here is a dancer whose intelligence and courage – for once – don't reside entirely in the tips of her toes'.

Away from the Royal Ballet, she toured Italy, North America and Canada with Wayne Eagling's group, 'Stars of the Royal Ballet', and was invited to join Irek Mukhamedov for the debut performances of his company 'Irek Mukhamedov and Friends' in 1992. She danced at the 1993 and 1995 Harrogate International Festival, and in April 1996 was invited to perform in the first 'Diamonds of World Ballet' Gala at the Kremlin Palace, Moscow. She toured Japan with Tetsuya Kumakawa and in the summers of 1994 and 1995 she organised, staged and starred in An Evening of British Ballet at the Sintra Festival in Portugal. In March 2001, she was invited to star in the triple bill Nijinsky Ritrovato at the Rome Opera House, dancing the Chosen Maiden in Rite of Spring and alongside Carla Fracci in Jeux.

== Artists' Development Initiative ==
In addition to her work with the Royal Ballet, she founded in 1998 the Artists' Development Initiative at the Royal Opera House, a programme designed to open up the resources and expertise within the theatre to small-scale companies and independent artists. Over its first two years, ADI worked with over 250 artists from outside the Royal Opera House and facilitated collaborations across art forms and between independent choreographers and classical dancers. ADI shared the 2001 Time Out Award for Outstanding Achievement in Dance with Wayne McGregor for Symbiont(s), premiered in the Clore Studio Upstairs in June 2000.

== ROH2 ==
Bull retired from The Royal Ballet in August 2001 to take up a new position at the Royal Opera House in January 2002, as Creative Director, ROH2, developing a range of small-scale and experimental artistic initiatives and overseeing the programme in the theatre's alternative performance spaces. In 2004, her remit expanded to include the delivery of a strategy for the ROH's work away from the main stage, including an alternative performance programme, opera and dance development initiatives, big screen live relays from the main stage, an 'On the Road' programme and daytime activities in the building. In addition, she managed ROH Collections, the Royal Opera House's extensive archives, and was focused on the organisation's Olympic planning and audience engagement strategies. In 2008, she was made Creative Director of the Royal Opera House, a post she held until 2012.

== Publishing ==
In addition to her work as a dancer, she has regularly written and lectured on the arts. In January 1996 she debated at the Oxford Union, opposing the motion 'This House Believes the National Lottery Gives Too Much Money to the Elitist Arts'. Her address was described by Lord Gowrie, her debating partner, as 'the best speech I have heard on the Arts in 30 years'. The motion was heavily defeated, a triumph which the Evening Standard attributed largely to 'the eloquence of a ballerina, unaccustomed to public speaking', describing her speech as 'cogently argued and delivered with generosity of spirit'.

In October 1996 she was invited by Lord Gowrie to deliver the Arts Council Annual Lecture at the Royal Society for the Arts, 'From Private Patronage to Public Purse'.

She has written articles for The Times, The Daily Telegraph, The Sunday Times, The Sunday Telegraph, Classic FM Magazine, New Statesman and The Spectator, and reviewed for The Telegraph, The Literary Review and several dance magazines. From 1999 to 2001 she wrote a regular column, Private View, for The Telegraph.

Aside from the Arts, she has a passionate interest in health and fitness, and has taught nutrition to the students of the Royal Ballet School as well as chairing the Prix de Lausanne's annual seminars on dance related health matters.

She has published three books. The Vitality Plan, (Dorling Kindersley, January 1998) was published simultaneously in the United States as Totally Fit, and has since been translated into seven languages. Dancing Away (Methuen, October 1998) is a diary of The Royal Ballet's first year 'on the road', as the Royal Opera House underwent its extensive and controversial redevelopment. To mark publication, Deborah was commissioned to read five extracts from the book on BBC Radio 4. Dancing Away was described by The Spectator as 'arguably the most amusing and fascinating dance book ever published'. The Faber Pocket Guide to Ballet, jointly with Luke Jennings, was published in 2004, describing important historical and repertoire ballets, with a 'View from the Wings' by Bull of her personal thoughts on dancing in a piece. A second book for Faber, The Everyday Dancer, appeared in 2011.

== Broadcasting career ==
=== Television ===
Bull's first programme for television, Dance Ballerina, Dance, was screened at Christmas 1998 as part of BBC2's Dance Night, an evening devoted entirely to dance which she co-presented along with the comedian Alexei Sayle. Travels with My Tutu, written and presented by Bull, was screened over Christmas 2000. This four-part BBC2 series explored breakdance, jive, belly dance and tango and attracted record audiences.

She has presented live on BBC Two from the Royal Opera House (Coppélia and The Nutcracker, both in 2000) and from Sadler's Wells (Rambert Dance Company), as well as a live Proms performance on BBC One in 2004. In June 2001, she presented the Eurovision Young Dancers 2001 competition from the Linbury Studio Theatre, broadcast to 18 European nations as well as on BBC2 and BBC Knowledge. She was also the UK's commentator for the contest in 1999, 2003 and 2005. Her three part, award-winning series for BBC2, The Dancer's Body, was screened in September and October 2002.

In March 2017, Bull was one of the judges who decided which of the finalists in the ballet category of the BBC Young Dancer 2017 competition would progress to the overall final.

=== Radio ===
She has made programmes for, and contributes regularly to, BBC Radio 4 including Dancing Away (1998), Leaving Barons Court (1999), Breaking the Law (2001) and Law in Order (2002), A Dance Through Time (2004), Happy Feet (2008) and Hothouse Kids (2009). She presented Sounds of Dance, a four-part series for BBC Radio 3 from December 2003 to January 2004.

In 2012, Bull presented the five-part BBC Radio 4 series, Dance Nation, on English dance. She was the castaway on BBC Radio 4's Desert Island Discs in May the following year, selecting Bach's Chaccone from Partita No.2 in D Minor performed by Nathan Millstein, an encyclopedia of the human brain, and the ballet Pleasure's Progress by Will Tuckett as her chosen favourite record, book and luxury item respectively.

== Public service ==
Bull was a member of the Arts Council England from 1998 to 2005, and a governor of the BBC from 2003 to 2006. She is a patron of the National Osteoporosis Society, Foundation for Community Dance and Escape Artists (a theatre company of paroled and ex-prisoners), sits on the board of the Prix de Lausanne and is an honorary vice president of Voices of British Ballet. She was a judge for the 2010 Man Booker Prize.

In December 2011, it was announced that Bull had been appointed the first executive director of King's College London's King's Cultural Institute, and would be taking up the role in March 2012.

In April 2024, Bull was appointed as non-executive director of the UK research funding agency, UKRI.

=== House of Lords ===
Bull became a Deputy Speaker of the House of Lords in 2024. She was one of two candidates in the 2026 Lord Speaker election.

== Honours and awards ==
Bull was appointed a Commander of the Order of the British Empire (CBE) in the Queen's 1999 Birthday Honours. She was nominated for a life peerage by the House of Lords Appointments Commission in June 2018. She was created Baroness Bull, of Aldwych in the City of Westminster, on 11 July.

She has been awarded honorary doctorates by University of Derby (1998), Sheffield Hallam University (2001), Kent University (2010) and the Open University (2005).
