= Eurovision Young Dancers 1993 =

International youth dance competition

Dates and venue
- Semi-final: 13 June 1993
- Final: 15 June 1993
- Venue: Dance House; Stockholm, Sweden

Organisation
- Organiser: European Broadcasting Union (EBU)
- Executive supervisor: Christian Clausen; Gisele de Marzio

Production
- Host broadcaster: Sveriges Television (SVT)
- Producer: Britt-Marie Olsson
- Director: Gunilla Wallin
- Executive producer: Måns Reutersward
- Presenters: Anneli Alhanko; John Chrispinsson

Participants
- Number of entries: 15
- Number of finalists: 8
- Debuting countries: Estonia; Greece; Poland; Slovenia
- Returning countries: Austria
- Non-returning countries: Bulgaria; Italy; Netherlands; Portugal; Yugoslavia (Note: Yugoslavia did not exist as such since 1992)
- Participation map: frameless}} Participating countries Did not qualify from the semi-final Countries that participated in the past but not in 1993

Vote
- Voting system: A professional jury chose the finalists and the top 3 performances
- Winning dancers: Spain; Zenaida Yanowsky

Eurovision Young Dancers 1993 was the 5th edition of Eurovision Young Dancers. It consisted of a semi-final on 13 June and a final on 15 June 1993, held at the Dance House in Stockholm, Sweden, and presented by Anneli Alhanko and John Chrispinsson. It was organised by the European Broadcasting Union (EBU) and host broadcaster Sveriges Television (SVT).

Dancers representing fifteen countries took part in the competition, with eight of them participating in the televised final. Estonia, Greece, Poland and Slovenia made their début with Austria returning, while Bulgaria, Italy, Netherlands, Portugal deciding not to participate, and Yugoslavia being banned from entering the contest. This was Estonia's first participation in any Eurovision event, as their prospective début at the Eurovision Song Contest 1993 did not advance past the pre-qualifying round, leading to their début in that event the following year.

The winner was Zenaida Yanowsky representing Spain, with Kusha Alexi representing Switzerland placing second, and Gregor Hatala representing Austria and Raphaëlle Delaunay-Belleville representing France both placing third. The prizes were presented by Princess Christina, the youngest sister of Carl XVI Gustaf, King of Sweden.

== Location ==
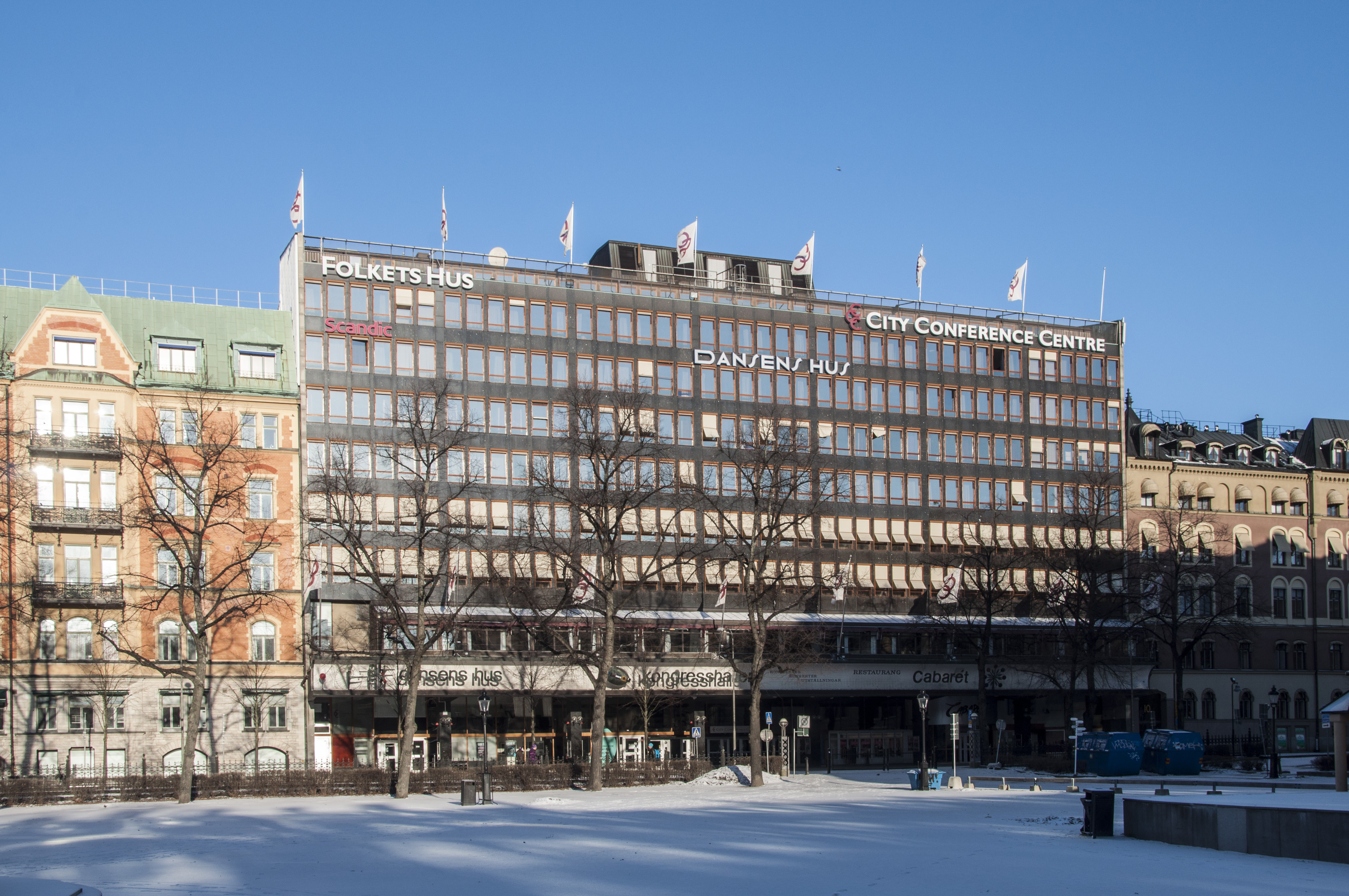
Dance House, Stockholm

The Dance House in Stockholm, Sweden, was the host venue for the 1993 edition of Eurovision Young Dancers.

== Format ==
The format consists of dancers who are non-professional and between the ages of 16–21, competing in a performance of dance routines of their choice, which they have prepared in advance of the competition. All of the acts then take part in a choreographed group dance during 'Young Dancers Week'.

Jury members of a professional aspect and representing the elements of ballet, contemporary, and modern dancing styles, score each of the competing individual and group dance routines. The overall winner upon completion of the final dances is chosen by the professional jury members.

As in 1991, the interval featured a documentary about the dancers that did not make it to the final.

== Participants and results ==
=== Preliminary round ===
Broadcasters from fifteen countries took part in the preliminary round of the 1993 contest, of which eight qualified to the televised grand final. The following participants failed to qualify.

Country	Broadcaster	Dancer(s)	Dance	Choreographer
Belgium	RTBF	Rafaella Raschella	The Sleeping Beauty	M. Petipa
Cyprus	CyBC	Lia Haraki	Sunrise - Sunset from Out of Silence	N. Loizidu
Denmark	DR	Julie Strandberg and Mads Blangstrup	The Flower Festival in Genzano	A. Bournonville
Estonia	ETV	Stanislav Yermakov and Luana Georg	The Flower Festival in Genzano	A. Bournonville
Greece	ERT	Theodora Bourbou	Esmeralda	M. Petipa
Norway	NRK	Kristine Oren	The Snark	S. Edvardsen
Slovenia	RTVSLO	Ursa Vidmar	Don Quixote	M. Fokin

=== Final ===
Awards were given to the top three participants. The table below highlights these using gold, silver, and bronze. The placing results of the remaining participants is unknown and never made public by the European Broadcasting Union.

R/O	Country	Broadcaster	Dancer(s)	Dance	Choreographer	Result
	Spain	TVE	Zenaida Yanowsky	Esmeralda	M. Petipa	1
	Switzerland	SRG SSR	Kusha Alexi	The Corsair	M. Petipa	2
	Austria	ORF	Gregor Hatala	Vayamos al diablo, 5 Tangos	H. van Manen	3
	France	France Télévision	Raphaëlle Delaunay-Belleville	Paquita, 2nd variation” from “Pas de trois	M. Petipa	3
	Finland	YLE	Riina Laurila	Vague Woman from Symphony no. 1	H. Heikkinen	
	Germany	ZDF	Jens Weber and Franziska Koch	Tchaikovsky – Pas de Deux	G. Balanchine	
	Poland	TVP	Anna Sąsiadek and Jacek Bres	Esmeralda	A. Vaganova	
	Sweden	SVT	Ludde Hagberg	Coppelia	A. Saint-Léon	

== Jury members ==
The jury members consisted of the following:

- Sweden – Nils-Åke Häggbom (Head of Jury)
- Sweden – Birgit Cullberg
- Denmark – Frank Andersen
- Romania/France – Gigi Căciuleanu
- Italy – Paolo Bortoluzzi
- Germany – Peter Van Dyk
- Spain – María de Ávila
- Switzerland – Heinz Spoerli
- Belgium – Micha van Hoecke
- France – Pierre Lacotte
- Sweden – Elsa-Marianne von Rosen
- Italy – Elisabetta Terabust
- Finland – Jorma Uotinen

== Broadcasts ==
The 1993 Young Dancers competition was broadcast in at least 15 countries. Known details on the broadcasts in each country, including the specific broadcasting stations and commentators are shown in the tables below.

Broadcasters in participating countries
Country	Broadcaster	Channel(s)	Commentator(s)	Ref(s)
Austria	ORF			
Belgium	RTBF	RTBF1 (Note: Delayed broadcast on 20 June at 16:05 CET (15:05 UTC))		
Cyprus	CyBC	RIK 2		
Denmark	DR	DR TV	Erik Aschengreen and Niels Oxenvad	
Estonia	ETV (Note: Delayed broadcast on 25 June at 21:45 EET (19:45 UTC))			
Finland	YLE	TV1		
France	France Télévision	France 3 (Note: Delayed broadcast at 23:10 CET (22:10 UTC))	Alain Duault	
Germany	ZDF (Note: Delayed broadcast at 23:00 CET (22:00 UTC))			
Greece	ERT	ET1		
Norway	NRK	NRK Fjernsynet (Note: Delayed broadcast on 20 June at 16:30 CET (15:30 UTC))		
Poland	TVP	TVP2		
Slovenia	RTVSLO			
Spain	TVE			
Sweden	SVT	Kanal 1, TV2	Niklas Lindblad and Gunilla Roempke	
Switzerland	SRG SSR			
Switzerland	SRG SSR	SRG Sportkette		
Switzerland	SRG SSR	SSR Chaîne Sportive	Jean-Pierre Pastori	
Switzerland	SRG SSR	TSI Canale Sportivo		

Broadcasters and commentators in non-participating countries
Country	Broadcaster	Channel(s)	Commentator(s)	Ref.
Czech Republic	ČT	ČT2 (Note: Delayed broadcast in a shortened format on 28 May 1994 at 20:10 (CEST))		
Italy	RAI	Rai Uno (Note: Delayed broadcast in a shortened format)	No commentary	

== See also ==
- Eurovision Song Contest 1993
