= Eurovision Young Dancers 2001 =

International youth dance competition

Dates and venue
- Semi-final: 18 June 2001
- Final: 23 June 2001
- Venue: Linbury Studio Theatre; London, United Kingdom

Organisation
- Organiser: European Broadcasting Union (EBU)
- Executive supervisor: Sarah Yuen

Production
- Host broadcaster: British Broadcasting Corporation (BBC)
- Director: Ross MacGibbon
- Executive producer: Bob Lockyer
- Presenter: Deborah Bull

Participants
- Number of entries: 18
- Number of finalists: 11
- Debuting countries: Ireland; Ukraine
- Returning countries: Austria; Estonia; Norway
- Non-returning countries: France; Hungary; Spain
- Participation map: frameless}} Participating countries Did not qualify from the semi-final Countries that participated in the past but not in 2001

Vote
- Voting system: A professional jury chose the finalists and the top 3 performances
- Winning dancers: Poland; David and Marcin Kupinski

Eurovision Young Dancers 2001 was the 9th edition of Eurovision Young Dancers. It consisted of a semi-final on 17 June and a final on 23 June 2001, held at the Linbury Studio Theatre of the Royal Opera House in London, United Kingdom, and presented by Deborah Bull. It was organised by the European Broadcasting Union (EBU) and host broadcaster British Broadcasting Corporation (BBC).

Dancers representing eighteen countries took part in the competition, with eleven of them participating in the televised final. Ireland and Ukraine made their début while Austria, Estonia and Norway returned. Hungary and Spain decided not to participate, along with France who broadcast the event. This was the first EBU event to feature a representative from Ukraine, who would go on to make their debut at the Eurovision Song Contest in 2003.

Each participating broadcaster could send one or two performers, male and female, not older than 20, who could perform one or two dances. The dancers could choose between classical and contemporary dance.

The winner was duo David Kupinski and Marcin Kupinski representing Poland, with Jeroen Verbruggen representing Belgium placing second, and duo Maartje Hermans and Golan Yosef representing Netherlands placing third.

== Location ==
The Linbury Studio Theatre of the Royal Opera House in London, United Kingdom was the host venue for the 2001 edition of Eurovision Young Dancers.

The Linbury is most notable for hosting performances of experimental and independent dance and music, by independent companies and as part of the ROH2, the contemporary producing arm of the Royal Opera House. The Linbury Studio Theatre regularly stages performances by the Royal Ballet School and also hosts the Young British Dancer of the Year competition.

== Format ==
The format consists of dancers who are non-professional and between the ages of 16–21, competing in a performance of dance routines of their choice, which they have prepared in advance of the competition. All of the acts then take part in a choreographed group dance during 'Young Dancers Week'.

Jury members of a professional aspect and representing the elements of ballet, contemporary, and modern dancing styles, score each of the competing individual and group dance routines. The overall winner upon completion of the final dances is chosen by the professional jury members.

The interval act was Symbiont(s) by Wayne McGregor.

== Participants and results ==
=== Preliminary round ===
Broadcasters from eighteen countries took part in the preliminary round of the 2001 contest, of which eleven qualified to the televised grand final. The following participants failed to qualify.

Country	Broadcaster	Participant	Dance	Choreographer
Cyprus	CyBC	Marina Kyriakidou	Variation of Paquita (Allegro)	M. Petipa
Austria	ORF	Rainer Krenstetter	Ballet de Verdi: Un bal masqué	V. Malakov
Ireland	RTÉ	Sarah Reynolds	Conversations in Silence	A. Costilla
Greece	ERT	Olga Tsimourta and Tina Nassika	Rythmique	G. Milhov
Norway	NRK	Tale Dolven	Asking For?	S. Edvardsen
Slovenia	RTVSLO	Eva Gasparic	Les Syphides - Prélude	Fokino
Ukraine	NTU	Leonid Sarafanov	Variation of Paquita (Masculin Role)	M. Petipa

=== Final ===
Awards were given to the top three participants. The table below highlights these using gold, silver, and bronze. The placing results of the remaining participants is unknown and never made public by the European Broadcasting Union.

R/O	Country	Broadcaster	Dancer(s)	Dance	Choreographer	Result
1	Belgium	RTBF	Jeroen Verbruggen	Hyperballad	J. Verbruggen & G. Egilsson	2
2	Germany	ZDF	Thiago Bordin	Tchaikovsky Variation - Pas de Deux	G. Balanchine	
3	Finland	Yle	Johanna Nuutinen	Angels Fly Low	M. Rouhiainen	
4	Poland	TVP	Dawid Kupinski and Marcin Kupinski	Brothers	E. Wesolowski	1
5	United Kingdom	BBC	Jamie Bond	Seigfried Solo from Act 3 Swan Lake	M. Petipa	
6	Sweden	SVT	Johan Thelander and Elizaveta Penkóva	At This Point	J. Thelander & E. Penkova	
7	Switzerland	SRG SSR	Sarah Kora Dayanova	Tango Te Amo	L. Smeak	
8	Czech Republic	ČT	Marek Kasparovsky and Jiri Pokorny	Alterego	T. Rychetsky & D. Stransky	
9	Estonia	ETV	Sergei Upkin	Franz Variation from Coppelia	A. Saint-Leon	
10	Latvia	LTV	Anna Novikova	Solo from Act 3 of Le Corsaire	M. Petipa	
11	Netherlands	NOS	Maartje Hermans and Golan Yosef	Perfect Skin	E. Wubbe	3

== Jury members ==
The jury members consisted of the following:

- United Kingdom – Matthew Bourne (Head of Jury)
- United States – Amanda Miller
- United Kingdom – Maina Gielgud
- Switzerland/Netherlands — Samuel Wuersten
- Italy – Monique Veaute

== Broadcasting ==
A total of 19 countries broadcast the 2001 event. France was the only country to broadcast the event without competing. Known details on the broadcasts in each country, including the specific broadcasting stations and commentators are shown in the tables below.

Broadcasters and commentators in participating countries
Country	Broadcaster	Channel(s)	Commentator(s)	Ref(s)
Austria	ORF	ORF 2 (Note: Delayed broadcast in a shortened format on 30 June at 10:05 (CET))		
Belgium	RTBF	La Deux		
Belgium	VRT			
Cyprus	CyBC			
Czech Republic	ČT	ČT2 (Note: Delayed broadcast on 19 August)		
Finland	Yle	TV1		
Estonia	ETV (Note: Delayed broadcast on 29 June at 22:30 (EET))			
Germany	ZDF (Note: Delayed broadcast in a shortened format on 30 June at 23:45 (CET))			
Greece	ERT			
Ireland	RTÉ			
Latvia	LTV	LTV1 (Note: Delayed broadcast on 1 July at 22:30 (EET))		
Netherlands	NOS	Nederland 3 (Note: Delayed broadcast in a shortened format on 10 July at 22:55 (CET))		
Norway	NRK	NRK1 (Note: Delayed broadcast on 9 September)		
Poland	TVP			
Slovenia	RTVSLO			
Sweden	SVT	SVT1	Agneta Bolme Börjefors	
Sweden	SVT	SVT Europa (Note: Delayed broadcast on 25 June at 16:55 (CET))		
Switzerland	SRG SSR	SF 2 (Note: Delayed broadcast on 24 June at 11:50 (CET))		
Ukraine	NTU			
United Kingdom	BBC	BBC Knowledge	Deborah Bull and Wayne McGregor	
United Kingdom	BBC	BBC Two (Note: Delayed broadcast in a shortened format on 14 July at 19:20 UTC)	Deborah Bull and Wayne McGregor	

Broadcasters and commentators in non-participating countries
Country	Broadcaster	Channel(s)	Commentator(s)	Ref(s)
France	France Télévisions	France 2		

== See also ==
- Eurovision Song Contest 2001
