= Bogusław Kaczyński =

Polish classical music journalist

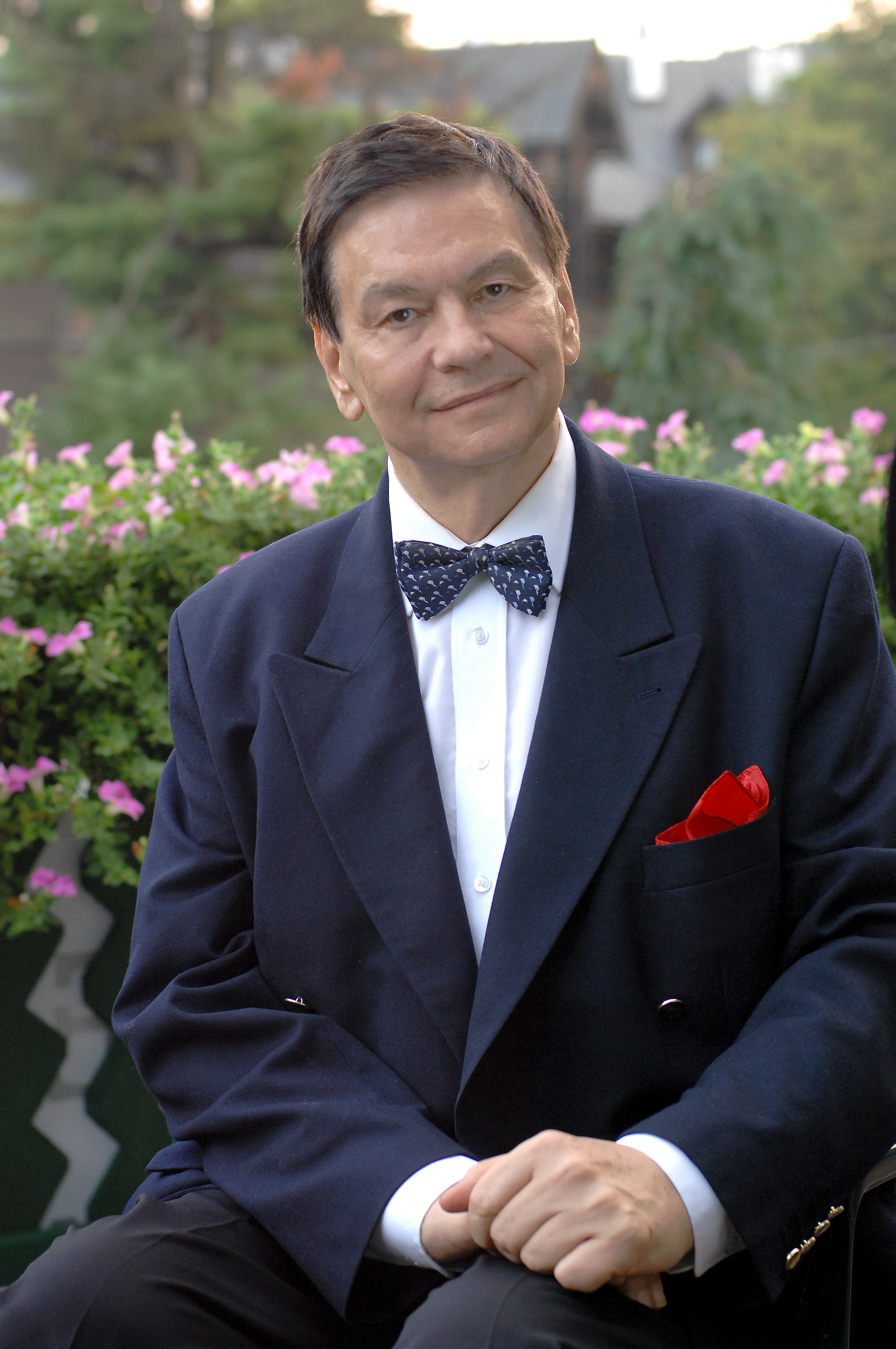
- Bogusław Kaczyński in 2008
- Born: 2 May 1942; Biała Podlaska, General Government
- Died: 21 January 2016 (aged 73); Warsaw, Poland
- Occupations: Journalist, music critic, writer
- Years active: 1960s–2015

Bogusław Kaczyński (2 May 1942 – 21 January 2016) was a Polish classical music journalist, music critic and writer.

Kaczyński was the author of a classical recording series, The Golden Collection. He also hosted musical competitions, including the Frederic Chopin Piano Competition, the Henryk Wieniawski Violin Competition, and the New Year's Concerts in Vienna.

Polityka magazine, ranked Kaczyński among the ten greatest Polish television personalities of the 20th century. Film critic Zygmunt Kałużyński said Kaczyński for opera, as an art form, did more than anybody in the country's whole history. Among others, he won Wiktor and Superwiktor awards. Kaczyński was the founder of the charity foundation ORFEO, which supports Polish culture.

Kaczyński had suffered a stroke in 2007. In 2016, he suffered another stroke and died in Warsaw, aged 73.
