= Eurovision Young Dancers 2005 =

International youth dance competition

Date and venue
- Final: 24 June 2005
- Venue: National Theatre; Warsaw, Poland

Organisation
- Organiser: European Broadcasting Union (EBU)
- Executive supervisor: Jeroen Depraetere

Production
- Host broadcaster: Telewizja Polska (TVP)
- Director: Jan Dworak
- Executive producer: Barbara Trzeciak-Pietkiewicz
- Presenter: Agata Konarska

Participants
- Number of entries: 13
- Number of finalists: 10
- Non-returning countries: Armenia; Estonia; Switzerland; Ukraine
- Participation map: frameless}} Participating countries Did not qualify from the semi-final Countries that participated in the past but not in 2005

Vote
- Voting system: A professional jury chose the finalists and gave points to each performance
- Winning dancers: Netherlands; Milou Nuyens (classical dance)

Eurovision Young Dancers 2005 was the 11th edition of Eurovision Young Dancers, held on 24 June 2005 at the National Theatre in Warsaw, Poland, and presented by Agata Konarska. It was organised by the European Broadcasting Union (EBU) and host broadcaster Telewizja Polska (TVP). For this contest, a week of dance master classes replaced the semi-final round in order to select the finalists.

Dancers representing thirteen countries took part in the competition, with ten of them participating in the televised final. Armenia, Estonia, Switzerland and Ukraine decided not to participate.

The winner was Milou Nuyens representing the Netherlands, with duo Elena Karpuhina and Michał Wylot representing Poland placing second, and Marjorie Lenain representing Belgium placing third. The next edition would eventually be held in 2011, following cancellations in 2007 and 2009.

== Location ==
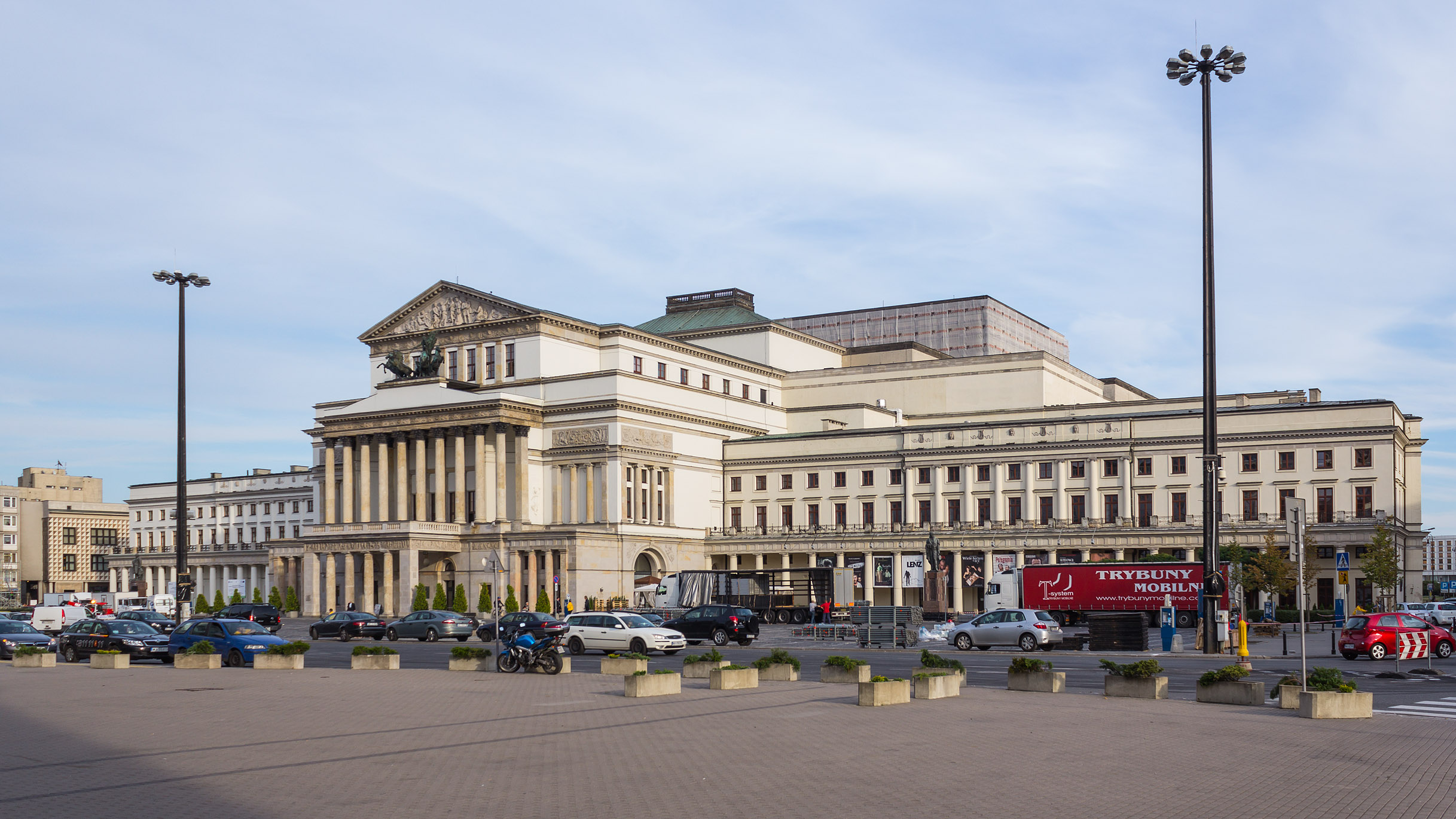
National Theatre in Warsaw, Poland

National Theatre, Warsaw in Poland was the host venue for the 2005 edition of Eurovision Young Dancers. This was the second time that TVP had hosted the competition, the first being in 1997. At that time, Poland and France were the only countries to have hosted more than once.

It was founded in 1765, during the Polish Enlightenment, by that country's last monarch, Stanisław August Poniatowski. The theatre shares the Grand Theatre complex at the Theatre Square in Warsaw with another national venue, the Poland's National Opera.

== Format ==
The format consists of dancers who are non-professional and between the ages of 16–21, competing in a performance of dance routines of their choice, which they have prepared in advance of the competition. All the acts then take part in a choreographed group dance during 'Young Dancers Week'.

Jury members of a professional aspect and representing the elements of ballet, contemporary, and modern dancing styles, score each of the competing individual and group dance routines. The overall winner upon completion of the final dances is chosen by the professional jury members.

Ocelot - Acrobatic Dance Theatre performed as the interval act. A behind-the-scenes documentary film was commissioned by the EBU to accompany this year's competition. Masters of Performance, produced by Boomtown Media and directed by Thomas Grube, follows the young dancers from across Europe as they prepare to take part in the competition.

== Participants and results ==
=== Preliminary round ===
The semi-final round was replaced by a week of dance master classes. Florence Clerc, Irek Mukhamedov, Christopher Bruce and Piotr Nardelli were the dance teachers selected to work with the participants and choose the ten finalists. The following countries failed to qualify.

Country	Broadcaster	Dancer(s)	Dance	Choreographer
Cyprus	CyBC	Joánna Avraám	"La Bayadère"	N. Makarova and M. Petipa
Norway	NRK	Fransiska Sveinall	"Le Corsaire"	M. Petipa
Slovenia	RTVSLO	Alena Medič	"Paquita V"	M. Petipa

=== Final ===
Awards were given to the top three participants. The table below highlights these using gold, silver, and bronze. The placing results of the remaining participants is unknown and never made public by the European Broadcasting Union.

R/O	Country	Broadcaster	Dancer(s)	Dance	Choreographer	Result
1	Romania	TVR	Robert Stefan Enache	Variation of Le Corsaire	M. Petipa	
2	United Kingdom	BBC	Alexander Jones	Impossible Self	L. King	
3	Belgium	RTBF	Marjorie Lenain	Esmeralda	M. Petipa	3
4	Netherlands	NPS	Milou Nuyens	Snakesense	R. van Berkel	1
5	Czech Republic	ČT	Šárka Faberová and Pavel Povrazník	Paganini Pas de Deux	V. Schneiderová	
6	Finland	Yle	Riku Lehtopolku and Mikko Lampinen	Could you take some of my weight...?	T. Saarinen	
7	Latvia	LTV	Sabīne Guravska	Paquita	M. Petipa	
8	Sweden	SVT	Danielle Rosengren	Grand Pas Classique	V. Gsovsky	
9	Poland	TVP	Elena Karpuhina and Michał Wylot	May I have a dance	R. Komassa	2
10	Greece	ERT	Eleana Andreoudi	Don Quixote	M. Petipa	

Choreography: Mateusz Polit

== Jury members ==
The jury consisted of the following members:

- Russia – Maya Plisetskaya (Honorary Head of the Jury)
- Russia – Irek Mukhamedov (President of the Jury)
- Netherlands – Krzysztof Pastor
- France/Romania – Gigi Căciuleanu
- Finland – Jorma Uotinen
- Poland – Emil Wesolowski

== Broadcasting ==
The 2005 Young Dancers competition was broadcast in at least 14 countries. Known details on the broadcasts in each country, including the specific broadcasting stations and commentators are shown in the tables below.

Broadcasters in participating countries
Country	Broadcaster(s)	Channel(s)	Commentator(s)	Ref(s)
Belgium	RTBF	La Deux		
Cyprus	CyBC			
Czech Republic	ČT	ČT1		
Finland	Yle	TV1 (Note: Deferred broadcast on 26 June at 11:45)	Sampo Kivelä	
Greece	ERT			
Latvia	LTV			
Netherlands	NPS	Nederland 3 (Note: Deferred broadcast on 26 June at 13:00)	Han Ebbelaar and Hadassah de Boer	
Norway	NRK	NRK2 (Note: The contest was summarised in a documentary broadcast on 6 November at 21:20)		
Poland	TVP	TVP2		
Romania	TVR	TVR Cultural		
Slovenia	RTVSLO			
Sweden	SVT	SVT2, SVT Europa	Camilla Lundberg	
United Kingdom	BBC	BBC Four (Note: Deferred broadcast, in a shortened format, on 24 September at 20:10 UTC)	Deborah Bull	

Broadcasters in non-participating countries
Country	Broadcaster(s)
Ukraine	NTU

== See also ==
- Eurovision Song Contest 2005
- Junior Eurovision Song Contest 2005
