= New Theatre (Plzeň) =

- Nové divadlo
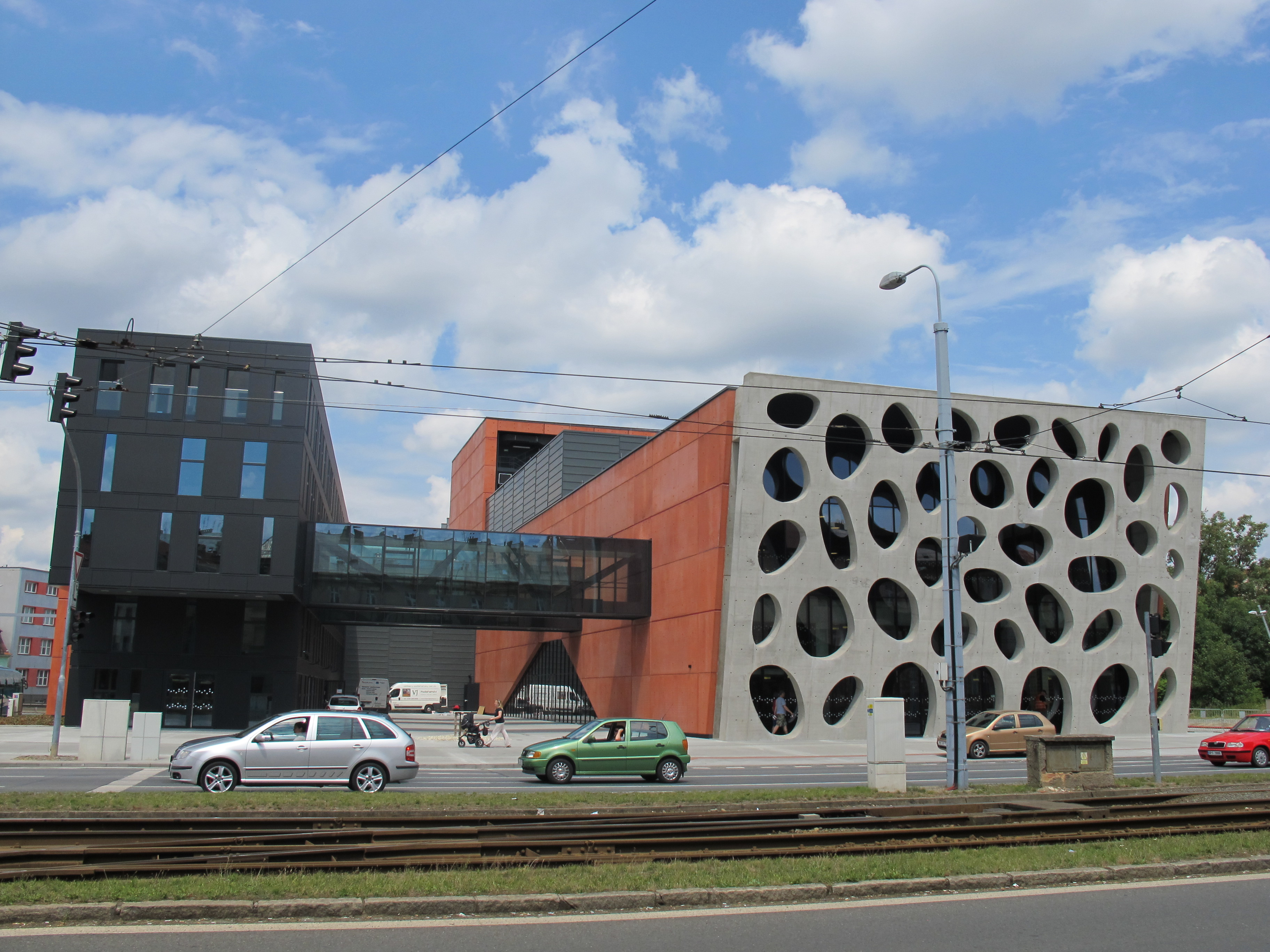
- New Theatre in Plzeň
- Interactive map of New Theatre
- Address: Palackého náměstí 2971/30; Plzeň; Czech Republic
- Coordinates: 49°44′54.23″N 13°22′11.89″E

Construction
- Opened: 2014

Website
- Official website

The New Theatre (Czech: Nové divadlo) in Plzeň is a Czech theatre. Construction of the venue cost 880 million CZK. The first performance at the New Theatre was The Bartered Bride from Bedřich Smetana.
