= Marcin Kupinski =

Polish ballet dancer (born 1983)

Marcin Kupinski (born 1983) is a Polish ballet dancer. In 2002, he joined the Royal Danish Ballet in Copenhagen becoming a principal dancer in 2011 after performing in August Bournonville's A Folk Tale.

== Biography ==
Kupinski was born and raised in Gdynia near Gdańsk in Poland where together with his younger brother Dawid he studied at the National Ballet School. He joined the Royal Danish Ballet in 2002, became a soloist in 2010 and a principal dancer in 2011.

As a principal, his roles have included Prince Siegfried in Swan Lake, James in La Sylphide, the prince in The Nutcracker, Junker Ove in A Folk Tale and the poet in La Sonnambula. As a guest performer, he has danced in the international company Cross Connection as well as in Rome, Lithuania and Japan.

Kupinski's awards include the Special Jury Prize at the 2002 Varna International Ballet Competition and the Grand Prix at the Eurovision Young Dancers contest in 2001.
