= Palais de Beaulieu =

Historical building in Lausanne, Switzerland

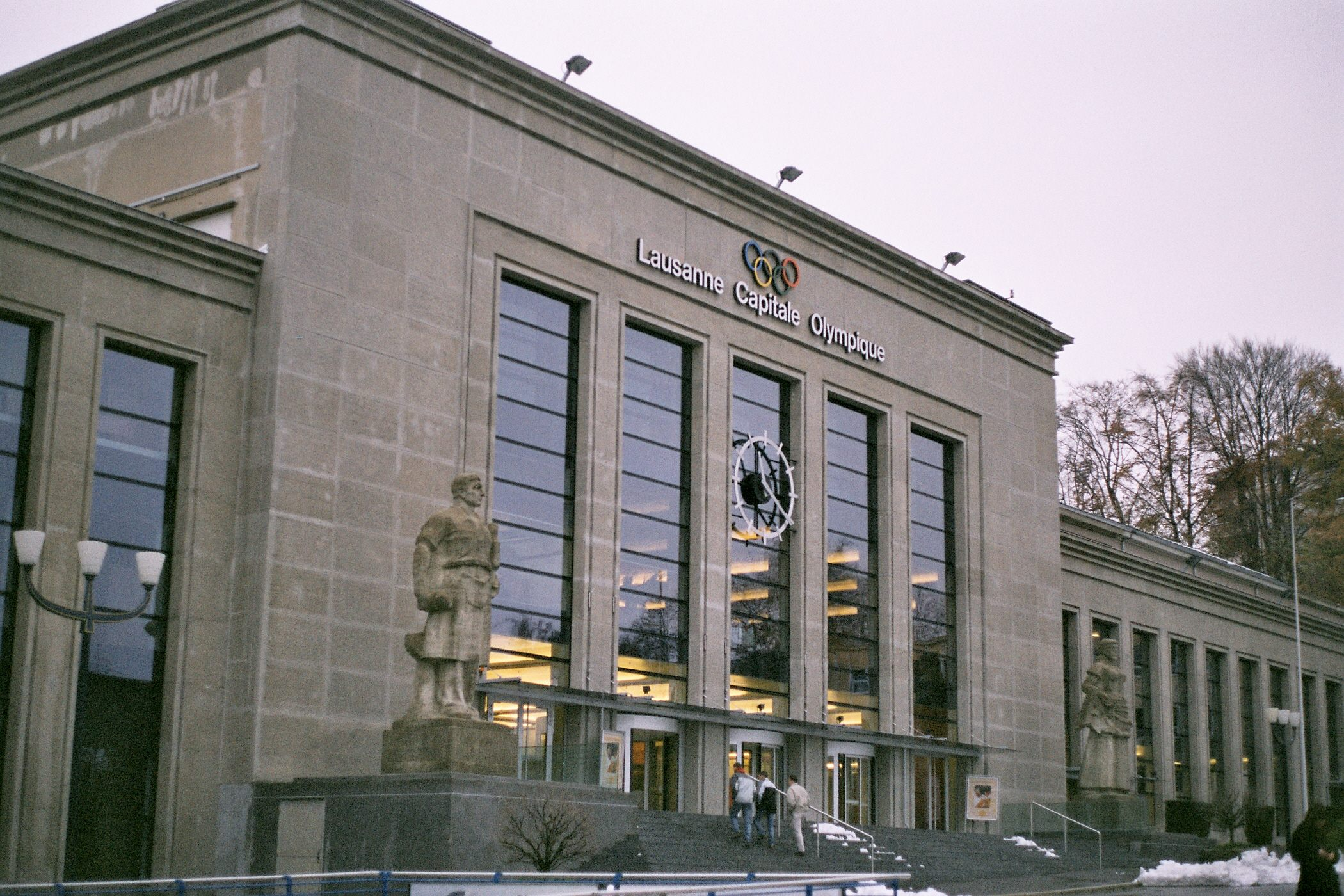
- The historical building of the Palais de Beaulieu.
- Interactive map of Palais de Beaulieu
- Former names: Théâtre de Beaulieu (1921-1956)
- Location: Lausanne, Switzerland
- Coordinates: 46°31′43″N 6°37′28″E
- Owner: Beaulieu Foundation
- Capacity: 1,844 (theatre)

Construction
- Built: 1921
- Opened: 1921
- Renovated: Various, up to 2016
- Expanded: 1954, 1960

Tenants
- Prix de Lausanne; Béjart Ballet Lausanne

Website
- beaulieu-lausanne.com/en/

The Palais de Beaulieu is the historical and emblematic building of the Lausanne convention and exhibition center, located in Lausanne, in the Vaud Canton, Switzerland. The Palais is a convention centre that welcomes mainly conventions and events.

The center includes the Théâtre de Beaulieu concert, dance and theatre hall. With 1,844 seats, the Théâtre de Beaulieu is the biggest theatre in Switzerland. The Prix de Lausanne, an international ballet competition, is also hosted at the Palais de Beaulieu. La Télé, a regional TV-channel, has its studio and its offices at Beaulieu, as well as the Béjart Ballet Lausanne company. Conference Halls 6 + 7 of the Palais hosted the 1989 Eurovision Song Contest.

Located in the Beaulieu area in Lausanne, the Convention and Exhibition Center lies in more than 6 hectares of ground. It boasts of 11,000 sq.m. of floor and 12,000 sq.m. of public gardens. The Convention Center uses around 20 modular rooms and halls. Beaulieu Lausanne, part of the MCH Group, also hosts some of Switzerland's major fairs and exhibitions. It is, with Lausanne railway station, one of the two buildings displaying the sign "Lausanne capitale olympique" ("Lausanne Olympic Capital"). The two statues of Casimir Raymond installed in 1954 represent crafts and agriculture.

== History ==
Palais de Beaulieu (top left) in 1951

The first "Comptoir Vaudois d'échantillons" was inaugurated in Lausanne in 1916, thanks to the Société industrielle et commerciale de Lausanne, the Chambre vaudoise du commerce et de l'industrie, with support from the Lausanne Municipality. This kind of event was a novelty in Switzerland but was to be generalized afterwards. The first Comptoir suisse took place in September, 1920. Since then, only one edition never happened: the one of 1939, because of the war. Note that the first official event of the NASA in Europe took place during the 1962 Comptoir suisse.

The great hall, later to be known as Beaulieu's main building, was built in 1921. It has been called the Palais de Beaulieu since 1957. During the Second World War, it hosted prisoners of war. Talks about creating a new theater began in 1949, and involved the Lausanne Municipality and the Société Coopérative du Comptoir Suisse. In 1954, the Théâtre de Beaulieu was inaugurated. Nowadays, the Theater is used, among others, by well-known local institutions such as the Béjart Ballet Lausanne, the Orchestre de la Suisse romande and the Paternelle.

On the western side of Beaulieu, buildings were added between 1920 and 1940. Between 1950 and 1954, development moved to the south and the east of the site. The North Halls were built in 1960, and many renovations followed. Thus, as well as the Comptoir suisse, Beaulieu gradually hosted conventions, artistic activities and economic events.

Since 2000, the buildings belong to a public law foundation named the Beaulieu Foundation, created by the Vaud Canton, the City of Lausanne and Vaud district councils (Lausanne Region and Association of Vaud municipalities). The foundation is in charge of maintenance, renovations and logistics, as well as the strategic and economic development of the site. It manages the Convention Center and, along with Opus One SA, the Beaulieu Theater. As a tenant, MCH Beaulieu Lausanne SA, that took over from the Société Coopérative du Comptoir Suisse, organizes fairs and exhibitions, mostly in the South Halls. Since 2006, Eldora Traiteur SA, a branch of the Eldora SA Group (previously DSR), is in charge of the catering.

The Beaulieu Foundation launched a renovation program named Beaulieu 2020, that encompasses years 2000 to 2020. Under the Beaulieu 2020 flag, the Palais de Beaulieu has undergone various renovations since 2001, and work is still going on. The old South Halls were destroyed and new South Halls were built in 2011. In 2014, a vote of the population of Lausanne rejected by 52% the project of building a tower of 90 m next to the Palais de Beaulieu. As a result, MCH Beaulieu Lausanne decided to reduce the number of conference activities (except general assemblies) and to concentrate on trade fairs (such as the Comptoir suisse). That triggered a reorganization of the Beaulieu 2020 project and of its partners.

As of 2014, spaces in the Palais de Beaulieu are being reallocated. The Haute Ecole de la Santé La Source (La Source Healthcare High School) has decided to take premises at Beaulieu. The Court of Arbitration for Sport is planning to move from the Château de Béthusy (already in Lausanne) to the south part of the Palais de Beaulieu.

== Events ==
=== Annual events ===
- Habitat Jardin
- Comptoir suisse
- Baby & Kid Planet
- Swiss Expo
- Le Salon des métiers et de la formation
- Le Prix de Lausanne
- le Béjart Ballet Lausanne
- L'OSR
- La Paternelle
- Numerus general assemblies and conventions

=== Past major events ===
- First International Congress on World Evangelization (1974)
- 91st session of the IOC (1986)
- Eurovision Song Contest 1989
- World Gymnaestrada (2012)
- Holiday on Ice (1979)
- Mamma Mia (2016)

== Notes and references ==
Preceded by RDS Simmonscourt; Dublin	Eurovision Song Contest; Venue; 1989	Succeeded by Vatroslav Lisinski Concert Hall; Zagreb
