= Anneli Alhanko =

Swedish ballet dancer and actress

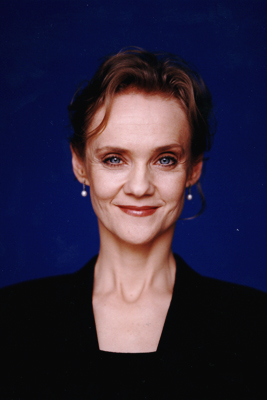
- Alhanko in 2011
- Born: December 11, 1953 (age 71); Bogotá, Colombia
- Citizenship: Swedish
- Occupation(s): Ballet dancer and actress

Anneli Elisabeth Alhanko Skoglund (born 11 December 1953 in Bogotá, Colombia) is a Swedish ballet dancer and actress. She is the daughter of the Finnish consul Erkki Alhanko, who was stationed in Colombia when she was born.

From 1971 to 1997 she was employed by the Royal Swedish Ballet in Stockholm, Sweden. She became one of the ballet company's premier prima ballerinas. She is one of twelve in the world with the title prima ballerina assoluta.

Alhanko is also one of the founders of the dance school Base 23 which opened in Stockholm January 2010.

Anneli Alhanko is aunt to the actress Josephine Alhanko, Miss Sweden 2006.

== Appearances in films ==
- 1984 - Abbalett
- 1993 - Sista dansen
- 1994 - Dansaren
- 2000 - The Working of Utopia
- 2002 - R.E.A. (Roligt. Elakt. Aktuellt.)
