= Eurovision Young Dancers 1997 =

International youth dance competition

Dates and venue
- Semi-final: 11 June 1997
- Final: 17 June 1997
- Venue: Teatr Muzyczny; Gdynia, Poland

Organisation
- Organiser: European Broadcasting Union (EBU)

Production
- Host broadcaster: Telewizja Polska (TVP)
- Director: Dariusz Goczal
- Executive producer: Barbara Trzeciak-Pietkiewicz; Małgorzata Jedynak-Pietkiewicz
- Presenters: Grażyna Torbicka; Bogusław Kaczyński (semi-final); Henk van der Meulen (final)

Participants
- Number of entries: 13
- Number of finalists: 7
- Debuting countries: Latvia; Slovakia
- Returning countries: Estonia
- Non-returning countries: Austria; France; Norway; Russia; Switzerland
- Participation map: frameless}} Participating countries Did not qualify from the semi-final Countries that participated in the past but not in 1997

Vote
- Voting system: A professional jury chose the finalists and the top 3 performances
- Winning dancers: Spain; Antonio Carmena San José

Eurovision Young Dancers 1997 was the 7th edition of Eurovision Young Dancers. It consisted of a semi-final on 11 June presented by Grażyna Torbicka and Bogusław Kaczyński, and a final on 17 June 1997 presented by Torbicka and Henk van der Meulen, held at the Teatr Muzyczny in Gdynia, Poland. It was organised by the European Broadcasting Union (EBU) and host broadcaster Telewizja Polska (TVP).

Dancers representing thirteen countries took part in the competition, with seven of them participating in the televised final. Latvia and Slovakia made their début while five countries (Austria, France, Norway, Russia and Switzerland) decided not to participate. However, France, Switzerland, Norway and, for the first time Ireland, broadcast the event.

The participating broadcasters could send one or two dancers, male or female, who performed one or two dances.

The winner was Antonio Carmena San José representing Spain, with Alain Honorez representing Belgium placing second, and Tim Matiakis representing Sweden placing third. This was the 5th win for Spain in the competition (4th in a row).

== Location ==
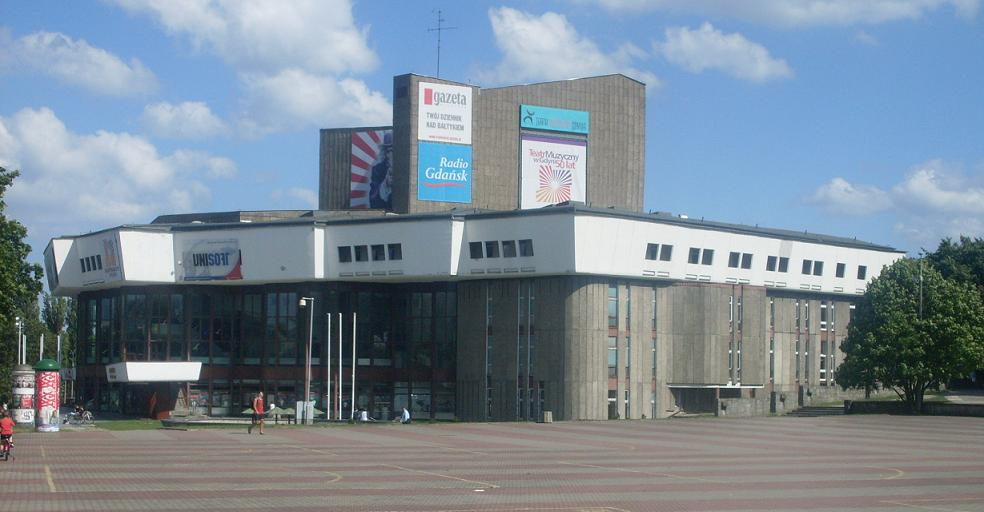
Teatr Muzyczny in Gdynia, before its major renovation (2008)

Teatr Muzyczny, a theatre in Gdynia, Poland, was the host venue for the 1997 edition of Eurovision Young Dancers.

== Format ==
The format consists of dancers who are non-professional and between the ages of 16–21, competing in a performance of dance routines of their choice, which they have prepared in advance of the competition. All of the acts then take part in a choreographed group dance during 'Young Dancers Week'.

Jury members of a professional aspect and representing the elements of ballet, contemporary, and modern dancing styles, score each of the competing individual and group dance routines. Once all the jury votes have been counted, the two participants which received the highest total of points progress to a final round. The final round consists of a 90-second 'dual', were each of the finalists perform a 45-second random dance-off routine. The overall winner upon completion of the final dances is chosen by the professional jury members.

Folk dance group "Bazuny" performed as the interval act.

== Participants and results ==
=== Preliminary round ===
Broadcasters from thirteen countries took part in the preliminary round of the 1997 contest, of which seven qualified to the televised grand final. The following participants failed to qualify.

Country	Broadcaster	Dancer	Dance	Choreographer
Cyprus	CyBC	Carolina Constantinou	La Bayadère	M. Petipa
Estonia	ETV	Mari Savitski	Don Quixote: Quitry Variations	M. Petipa
Germany	ZDF	Valentina Scaglia	Le Conservatoire	H.S. Paulli and A. Bournonville
Slovenia	RTVSLO	Ana Klasnja	Pas de deux	G. Balanchine
Hungary	MTV	Gabor Kapin	La Sylphide	A. Bournonville
Greece	ERT	Nefeli Markaki	Pas de deux	G. Balanchine

=== Final ===
Awards were given to the top three participants. The table below highlights these using gold, silver, and bronze. The placing results of the remaining participants is unknown and never made public by the European Broadcasting Union.

R/O	Country	Broadcaster	Dancer(s)	Dance	Choreographer	Result
1	Belgium	RTBF	Alain Honorez	The Sleeping Beauty	M. Petipa	2
2	Latvia	LTV	Viktorija Jansone	Sleeping Beauty: Aurora's variation	M. Petipa	
3	Sweden	SVT	Tim Matiakis	Paquita	M. Petipa	3
4	Finland	Yle	Salla Suominen	Romeo and Juliet: Juliet's variation	E. Sylvestersen	
5	Slovakia	STV	Roman Lazik	La Sylphide	A. Bournonville	
6	Poland	TVP	Magdalena Dzięgielewska and Bartosz Anczykowski	Paquita - Grand pas de deux	F. Capouste	
7	Spain	TVE	Antonio Carmena San José	Angelitos Locos	J.C. Santamaría	1

== Jury members ==
The jury members consisted of the following:

- Russia – Maya Plisetskaya (Head of Jury)
- Romania/France – Gigi Căciuleanu
- Italy – Paola Cantalupo
- Poland – Katarzyna Gdaniec
- Germany – Uwe Scholz
- Sweden – Gösta Svalberg
- Switzerland – Heinz Spoerli

== Broadcasts ==
The 1997 Young Dancers competition was broadcast in 17 countries. France, Ireland, Norway, and Switzerland broadcast it in addition to the competing countries. Known details on the broadcasts in each country, including the specific broadcasting stations and commentators are shown in the tables below.

Broadcasters and commentators in participating countries
Country	Broadcaster	Channel(s)	Commentator(s)	Ref.
Belgium	RTBF	Télé 21	Benoît Jacques de Dixmude	
Belgium	BRTN	TV2		
Cyprus	CyBC			
Estonia	ETV			
Finland	Yle			
Germany	ZDF (Note: Delayed broadcast in a shortened format on 26 June at 00:15 (CET))			
Greece	ERT			
Hungary	MTV	TV1 (Note: Deferred broadcast on 20 July at 22:30 (CET))		
Latvia	LTV			
Poland	TVP			
Slovakia	STV			
Slovenia	RTVSLO			
Spain	TVE			
Sweden	SVT	SVT1 (Note: Delayed broadcast on 17 June at 22:00 (CET))	Niklas Lindblad	

Broadcasters in non-participating countries
Country	Broadcaster(s)	Channel(s)	Commentator(s)	Ref.
France	France 3			
Ireland	RTÉ			
Norway	NRK	NRK2 (Note: Delayed broadcast on 17 June at 22:10 (CET))	Arild Erikstad	
Switzerland	SRG SSR			

== See also ==
- Eurovision Song Contest 1997
