= Eurovision Young Dancers 2013 =

International youth dance competition

Date and venue
- Final: 14 June 2013
- Venue: Baltic Opera House; Gdańsk, Poland

Organisation
- Organiser: European Broadcasting Union (EBU)
- Executive supervisor: Vladislav Yakovlev

Production
- Host broadcaster: Telewizja Polska (TVP)
- Director: Tomasz Motyl
- Executive producer: Robert Kamyk
- Presenters: Tomasz Kammel; Michael Nunn (backstage); William Trevitt (backstage)

Participants
- Number of entries: 10
- Debuting countries: Belarus
- Returning countries: Armenia; Czech Republic; Ukraine
- Non-returning countries: Croatia; Greece; Kosovo; Portugal
- Participation map: frameless}} Participating countries Did not qualify to the final round Countries that participated in the past but not in 2013

Vote
- Voting system: Three professional juries choose the top 2 performances, and after the final battle, they choose the winner dancer.
- Winning dancers: Netherlands; Sedrig Verwoert

Eurovision Young Dancers 2013 was the 13th edition of Eurovision Young Dancers, held on 14 June 2013 at the Baltic Opera House in Gdańsk, Poland, and presented by Tomasz Kammel. It was organised by the European Broadcasting Union (EBU) and host broadcaster Telewizja Polska (TVP).

Dancers representing ten countries participated in the televised final. Belarus made their début while Armenia, Czech Republic and Ukraine returned. Croatia, Greece, Kosovo and Portugal decided not to participate.

The event is aimed at young dancers aged between 16 and 21, competing in modern dances, be it solo or in couples, as long as they were not professionally engaged.

Sedrig Verwoert representing the Netherlands won the contest, with Felix Berning representing Germany placing second (runner-up).

== Location ==
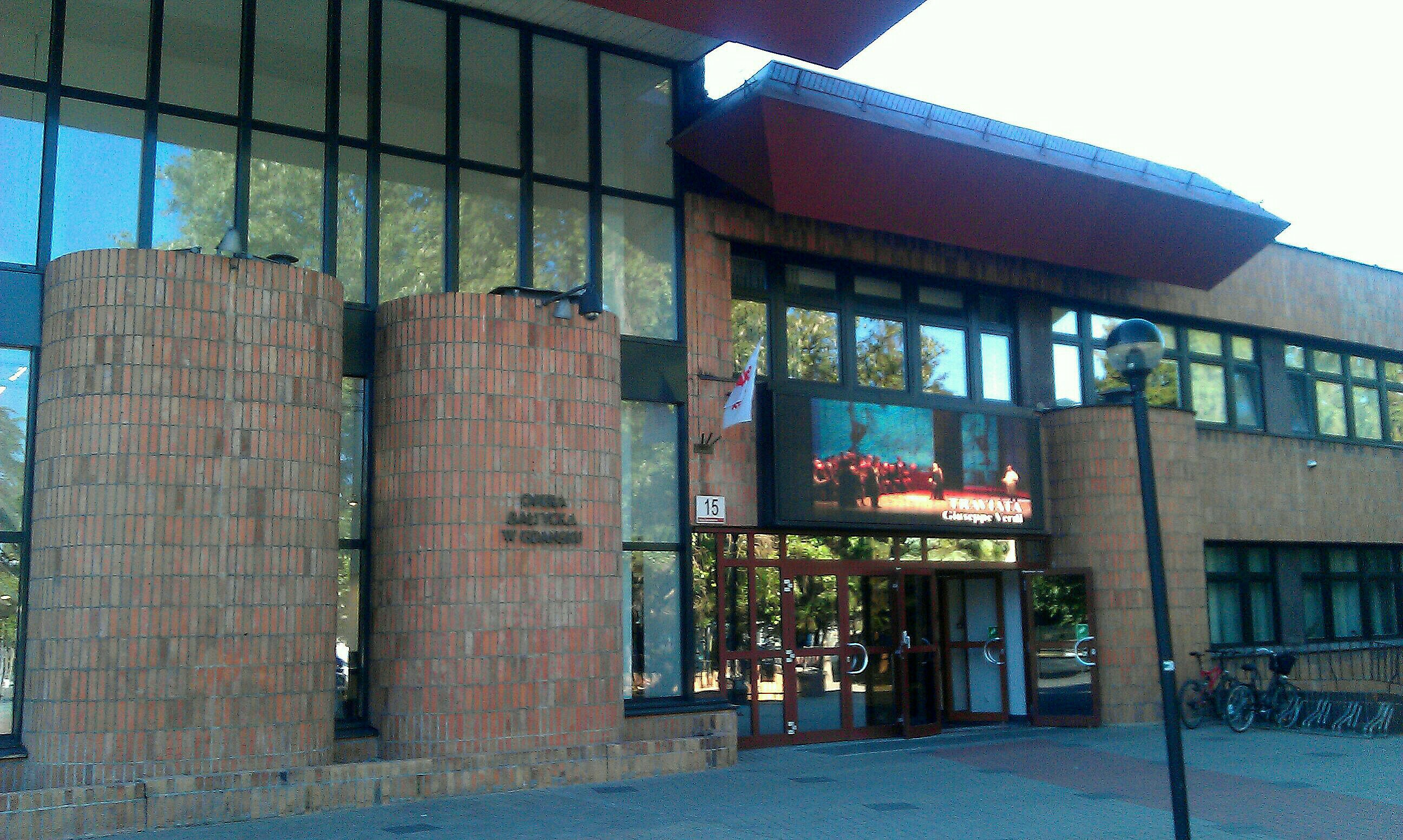
Baltic Opera House

The chosen venue by the host broadcaster TVP was the Baltic Opera House in Gdańsk. The stage was designed by Michał Białousz.

== Format ==
The format consists of dancers who are non-professional and between the ages of 16–21, competing in a performance of dance routines of their choice, which they have prepared in advance of the competition. All of the acts then take part in a choreographed group dance during 'Young Dancers Week'.

=== Presenters ===
Polish presenter Tomasz Kammel was the main host of the 2013 contest. For the first time, there were also two additional co-presenters who presented the backstage segments during the show. These were dancers Michael Nunn and William Trevitt of BalletBoyz.

== Jury panel ==
Jury members of a professional aspect and representing the elements of ballet, contemporary, and modern dancing styles, score each of the competing individual and group dance routines. Once all the jury votes have been counted, the two participants which received the highest total of points progress to a final round. The final round consists of a 90-second 'dual', were each of the finalists perform a 45-second random dance-off routine. The overall winner upon completion of the final dances is chosen by the professional jury members. The jury members consisted of the following:

- Poland – Krzysztof Pastor
- Germany – Nadia Espiritu
- New Zealand/United Kingdom – Cameron McMillan

== Participants and results ==
The performance order was agreed by the Ballet Boyz, and approved by the chair of the EBU Steering Group on 10 June 2013.

=== Results ===
| R/O | Country | Broadcaster | Dancer(s) | Dance | Choreographer | Result |
|---|---|---|---|---|---|---|
| 1 | Armenia | ARMTV | Vahagn Margaryan^{†} | Blind Alley | Arsen Mehrabyan | —N/a |
| 2 | Belarus | BTRC | Yana Shtangey | Esmeralda variation | Marius Petipa | —N/a |
| 3 | Netherlands | NTR | Sedrig Verwoert | The 5th Element | Marco Gerris | Advanced |
| 4 | Sweden | SVT | Stephanie Liekola Isla | Entrapped | Mauro Rojas | —N/a |
| 5 | Ukraine | NTU | Nikita Vasylenko | The Legend of Spartacus | Tetyana Denysova | —N/a |
| 6 | Czech Republic | ČT | Adéla Abdul Khalegová | Love Under Pressure | Adéla Abdul Khalegová | —N/a |
| 7 | Poland | TVP | Kristóf Szabó | My Life and Love Might Still Go on in Your Heart | Katarzyna Kubalska | —N/a |
| 8 | Norway | NRK | Julie Schartum Dokken | Moment | Julie Schartum Dokken | —N/a |
| 9 | Slovenia | RTVSLO | Patricija Crnkovič | Passion | Dimitrij Popovski | —N/a |
| 10 | Germany | WDR | Felix Berning | Home | Felix Landerer & Felix Berning | Advanced |

==== Final Duel ====
| Country | Participant | Dance | Jury members votes | | | Result |
| Country | Participant | Dance | K. Pastor | N. Espiritu | C. McMillan | Result |
|---|---|---|---|---|---|---|
| Germany | Felix Berning | Home | | | | Runner up |
| Netherlands | Sedrig Verwoert | The 5th Element | X | X | X | Winner |

== Broadcasting ==
The contest was broadcast by the following broadcasters:

| Date of broadcast | Country | Station |
|---|---|---|
| 14 June 2013 | Armenia | Armenia 1 |
| 14 June 2013 | Belarus | BTRC |
| 14 June 2013 | Czech Republic | ČT2 (45-minute delay) |
| 14 June 2013 | Norway | NRK1 (5-minute delay) |
| 14 June 2013 | Poland | TVP Kultura |
| 14 June 2013 | Rest of the world | www.youngdancers.tv |
| 14 June 2013 | Ukraine | NTU |
| 15 June 2013 | Poland | TVP 2 |
| 15 June 2013 | Sweden | SVT2 |
| 18 June 2013 | Belgium | VRT OP12 |
| 23 June 2013 | Netherlands | NED 2 |
| 30 June 2013 | Slovenia | TV SLO 2 |
| 7 July 2013 | Germany | WDR Fernsehen |

== See also ==
- Eurovision Song Contest 2013
- Junior Eurovision Song Contest 2013
