= List of microcars by country of origin: N =

== List ==
| Country | Automobile Name | Manufacturer | Engine Make/Capacity | Seats | Year | Other information |
|---|---|---|---|---|---|---|
| Netherlands | Bambino | NV Alweco, Veghel | ILO 197 cc | 2+2 | 1955–1957 | It is unclear if any cars were manufactured in the Netherlands and more likely that those produced were Fuldamobils, bought in from Germany and re-badged. The car was initially marketed as the Hostaco made by Hostag-Mobile in Rotterdam before being renamed the Bambino. A convertible version was shown at the Amsterdam Motor Show in 1957 with restyled bodywork. See also nl:Hostaco |
| Netherlands | Citeria | Citeria NV, The Hague | Bayerische Motoren-Werke AG 590 cc | 2 | 1958–1963 | See also nl:Citeria |
| Netherlands | DAF 600 | Van Doornes Automobielfabriek NV, Eindhoven | DAF 582 cc | 4 | 1958 | |
| Netherlands | Canta | Waaijenberg Mobiliteit | Honda 160 cc or 200 cc | 2 | 1995... | Made for drivers with a disability. The range includes a model for wheelchair users that has a pneumatically lowered rear ramp entrance and is driven from the user's wheelchair. |
| Norway | City Bee | Pivco, Oslo | Electrical | 2 | 1995 | Production: 120 cars |
| Norway | Buddy | ElbilNorge AS, Oslo | Electrical, 13 kW, 72 V | 2 | 2007... | Updated version of the Kewet |
| Norway | TH!NK city | Think Global, Aurskog | Electrical | 2 | 2001–2002 | Production: 1005 cars |
| Norway | new TH!NK city | Think Global, Aurskog | Electrical | 2 or 2+2 | 2008... | |
