= Eurovision Young Dancers 1999 =

European dance competition

Dates and venue
- Semi-final: 4 July 1999
- Final: 10 July 1999
- Venue: Opéra de Lyon; Lyon, France

Organisation
- Organiser: European Broadcasting Union (EBU)

Production
- Host broadcaster: France 3
- Director: Guy Darmet
- Executive producer: Gilbert Plique; Michele Banaletti
- Presenter: Alex Taylor

Participants
- Number of entries: 16
- Number of finalists: 10
- Debuting countries: Czech Republic
- Returning countries: France; Netherlands; Switzerland; United Kingdom
- Non-returning countries: Estonia; Slovakia
- Participation map: frameless}} Participating countries Did not qualify from the semi-final Countries that participated in the past but not in 1999

Vote
- Voting system: A professional jury chose the finalists and the top 3 performances
- Winning dancers: Germany; Stegli Yohan and Katja Wünsche

Eurovision Young Dancers 1999 was the 8th edition of Eurovision Young Dancers. It consisted of a semi-final on 4 July and a final on 10 July 1999, held at the Opéra de Lyon, in Lyon, France, and presented by Alex Taylor. It was organised by the European Broadcasting Union (EBU) and host broadcaster France 3.

Dancers representing sixteen countries took part in the competition, with ten of them participating in the televised final. Czech Republic made their début (their first participation in any Eurovision event, with the country debuting at the Eurovision Young Musicians the following year and the flagship Eurovision Song Contest in 2007) while host country France, Netherlands, Switzerland and United Kingdom returned. Estonia and Slovakia decided not to participate.

Both single dancers and couples younger than 20 could enter the competition, male or female. Single dancers had to perform 2 pieces of maximum 10 minutes in total, while couples could choose to perform 1 or 2 dances, but in total no longer than 10 minutes as well.

The winner was duo Katja Wünsche and Stegli Yohan representing Germany, with Nathalie Nordquist representing Sweden placing second, and Clara Blanco representing Spain placing third.

== Location ==
Opéra de Lyon in 2021

Opéra de Lyon, in Lyon, France, was the host venue for the 1999 edition of Eurovision Young Dancers.

The Opéra Nouvel (Nouvel Opera House) in Lyon, France, is the home of the Opéra National de Lyon. The original opera house was re-designed by the distinguished French architect, Jean Nouvel between 1985 and 1993 in association with the agency of scenography dUCKS scéno and the acoustician Peutz. Serge Dorny was appointed general director in 2003.

== Format ==
The format consists of dancers who are non-professional and between the ages of 16–21, competing in a performance of dance routines of their choice, which they have prepared in advance of the competition. All of the acts then take part in a choreographed group dance during 'Young Dancers Week'.

Jury members of a professional aspect and representing the elements of ballet, contemporary, and modern dancing styles, score each of the competing individual and group dance routines. The overall winner upon completion of the final dances is chosen by the professional jury members.

The interval act was a performance by the hip-hop dance group "Kä-fig".

== Participants and results ==
=== Preliminary round ===
Broadcasters from sixteen countries took part in the preliminary round of the 1999 contest, of which ten qualified to the televised grand final. The following participants failed to qualify.

Country	Broadcaster	Participant	Dance	Choreographer
Cyprus	CyBC	Dafni Mouyiassi	The Sleeping Beauty	M. Petipa
United Kingdom	BBC	Lara Glew	La Bayadère	M. Petipa
Hungary	MTV	Attila Bongar	Le Corsaire	M. Petipa
Czech Republic	ČT	Lukáš Slavický and Zuzana Zahradnikova	Don Quixote	M. Petipa
Slovenia	RTVSLO	Ana Klašnja	Variation of Giselle	J. Coralli and J. Perrot
Switzerland	SRG SSR	Laetitia Guggi	La Bayadère	M. Petipa

=== Final ===
Awards were given to the top three participants. The table below highlights these using gold, silver, and bronze. The placing results of the remaining participants is unknown and never made public by the European Broadcasting Union.

R/O	Country	Broadcaster	Dancer(s)	Dance	Choreographer	Result
1	Greece	ERT	Maria Boubouli	Don Quixote	M. Petipa	
2	Netherlands	NPS	Ernst Meisner	La fille mal gardée	J. Dauberval	
3	Spain	TVE	Clara Blanco	Variation of Giselle	J. Coralli and J. Perrot	3
4	France	France Télévision	Emmanuel Eggermont and Juliette Roudet	Les Chiens	J. Bouvier and R. Obadia	
5	Poland	TVP	Marta Wojtaszewska and Marcin Krajewski	Stars & Stripes	G. Balanchine	
6	Latvia	LTV	Elza Leimane	Esmeralda	J. Perrot	
7	Finland	Yle	Aarne Ruutu	La Sylphide (James variation)	A. Bournonville	
8	Germany	ZDF	Katja Wünsche and Stegli Yohan	Cinderella	J. Neumeier	1
9	Belgium	RTBF	Frederik Deberdt	La Sylphide	A. Bournonville	
10	Sweden	SVT	Nathalie Nordquist	Flower Festival in Genzano	A. Bournonville	2

== Jury members ==
The jury members consisted of the following:

- Russia – Boris Eifman (Head of Jury)
- France – Maguy Marin
- Australia – Meryl Tankard
- France/Monaco – Jean-Christophe Maillot
- Finland – Tero Saarinen
- Spain – Vicente Sáez
- Greece – Victoria Maragopoulou

== Broadcasting ==
A total of 20 countries broadcast the 1999 event, including Croatia, Ireland, Norway and Russia. Known details on the broadcasts in each country, including the specific broadcasting stations and commentators are shown in the tables below.

Broadcasters in participating countries
Country	Broadcaster(s)	Channel(s)	Commentator(s)	Ref.
Belgium	RTBF	La Deux		
Cyprus	CyBC			
Czech Republic	ČT			
Finland	Yle	TV1		
France	France Télévision	France 3 (Note: Deferred broadcast at 23:05 (CET))	Alain Duault and Agnes Letestu	
France	Canal+	Mezzo		
Germany	ZDF (Note: Delayed broadcast in a shortened format on 12 September at 23:50 (CET))			
Greece	ERT			
Hungary	MTV	M2 (Note: Deferred broadcast on 1 August at 21:00 (CET))		
Latvia	LTV			
Netherlands	NPO	Nederland 3 (Note: Delayed two-part broadcast, in a shortened format, on 12 and 19 July at 21:19 and 21:26 (CET) respectively)		
Poland	TVP			
Slovenia	RTVSLO			
Spain	TVE			
Sweden	SVT	SVT1 (Note: Deferred broadcast on 10 July at 21:15 (CET))	Bim Clinell	
Switzerland	DRS	SF2		
Switzerland	TSR	TSR 2	Philippa de Rothen	
Switzerland	TSI			
United Kingdom	BBC	BBC Two (Note: Delayed broadcast, in a shortened format on 14 August at 16:35; contest featured as part of the programme Summer Dance, which in this episode documented the UK participant's journey to the contest.)	Deborah Bull	

Broadcasters in non-participating countries
Country	Broadcaster(s)
Croatia	HRT
Ireland	RTÉ
Norway	NRK
Russia	RTR

== See also ==
- Eurovision Song Contest 1999
