= Eurovision Young Dancers 1987 =

International youth dance competition

Date and venue
- Final: 31 May 1987
- Venue: Schlosstheater; Schwetzingen, Germany

Organisation
- Organiser: European Broadcasting Union (EBU)
- Executive supervisor: Frank Naef

Production
- Host broadcaster: Zweites Deutsches Fernsehen (ZDF)
- Director: Hugo Käch
- Executive producer: Harro Eisele
- Presenter: Margot Werner

Participants
- Number of entries: 14 (Note: Netherlands and Belgium competed together with a joint entry. In the competition, the two dancers represented the Dutch colors.)
- Debuting countries: Austria; Canada; Yugoslavia
- Participation map: frameless}} Participating countries

Vote
- Voting system: A professional jury chose the top 3 participants.
- Winning dancers: Denmark; Rose Gad Poulsen and Nikolaj Hübbe

Eurovision Young Dancers 1987 was the 2nd edition of Eurovision Young Dancers, held on 31 May 1987 at the Schlosstheater in Schwetzingen, Germany, and presented by Margot Werner. It was organised by the European Broadcasting Union (EBU) and host broadcaster Zweites Deutsches Fernsehen (ZDF).

Dancers from fourteen countries participated in the televised final. Austria, Canada, and Yugoslavia made their debut at the contest, while Belgium and Netherlands competed together with a joint entry. For the first time ever, the Canadian broadcaster CBC/Radio-Canada (an EBU associate member), entered the competition, making it the only Eurovision event to feature a country from the Americas (until Canada themselves debuted at the 2027 Eurovision Song Contest), and the only EBU event to feature an associate member as a participant prior to Australia's debut at the Eurovision Song Contest 2015. The participant broadcasters could send one or two dancers, male or female, that could not be older than 20. Each entry consisted in one or two dances with no rules or limitations regarding the style. The dances could not be longer than 5 minutes (for soloists) or 10 minutes (for couples).

The winners were Rose Gad Poulsen and Nikolaj Hübbe from Denmark, with Frédéric Gafner from Switzerland placing second, and Stefanie Arndt from West Germany placing third.

== Location ==
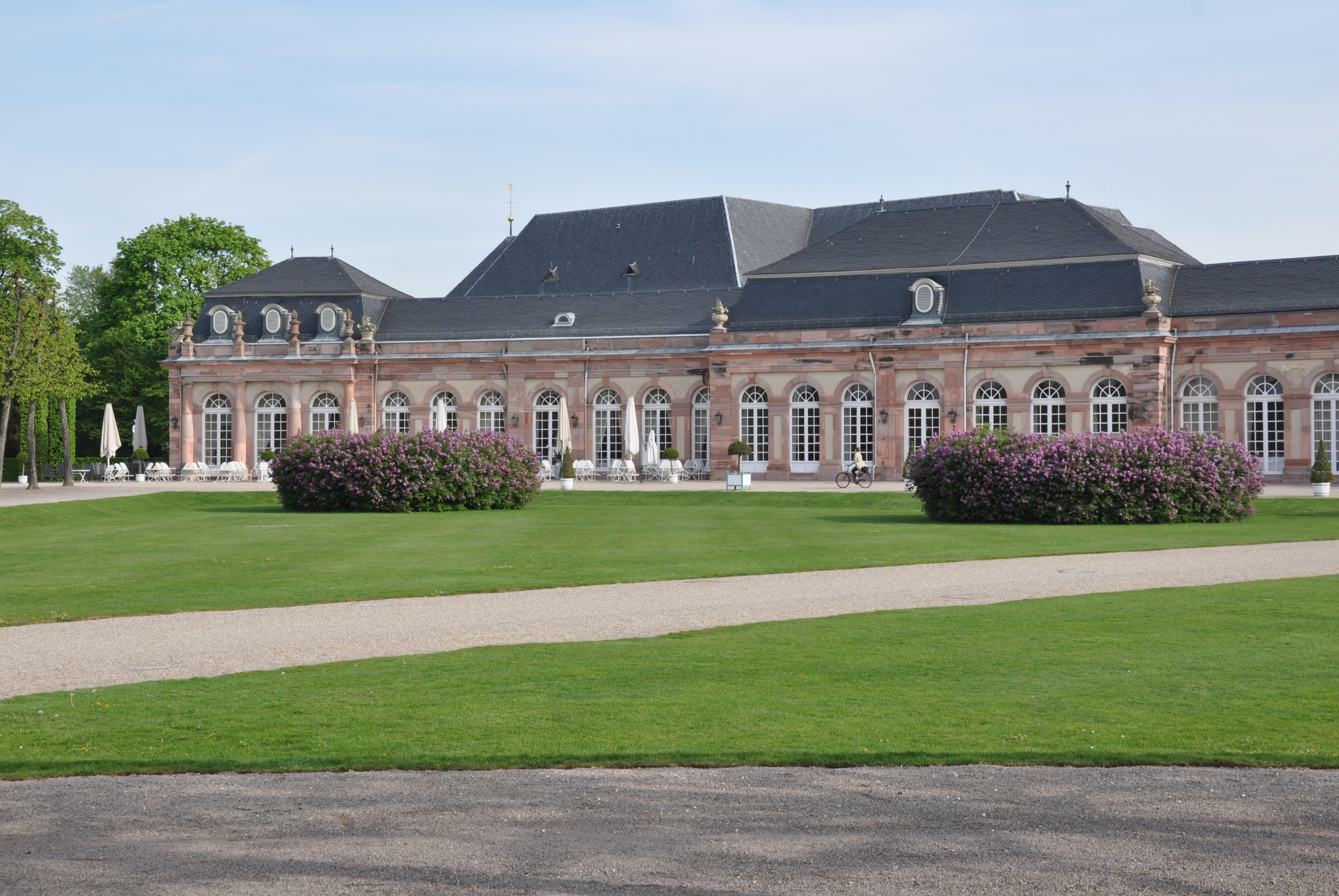
Schlosstheater Schwetzingen

Schlosstheater Schwetzingen (Schwetzingen palace theater), a court theater in Schwetzingen, Baden-Württemberg, Germany was the host venue for the 1987 edition of Eurovision Young Dancers.

The historic building, opened in 1753, is part of Schloss Schwetzingen and since 1952 the principal venue of the Schwetzingen Festival. It is also called Hoftheater (court theater), Hofoper (court opera), and Comoedienhaus (comedy house). The frequently applied name Rokokotheater (Rococo theater) is misleading, because it shows also neoclassical elements, added in 1762.

== Format ==
The format consists of dancers who are non-professional and between the ages of 16–21, competing in a performance of dance routines of their choice, which they have prepared in advance of the competition. All of the acts then take part in a choreographed group dance during 'Young Dancers Week'.

Jury members of a professional aspect and representing the elements of ballet, contemporary, and modern dancing styles, score each of the competing individual and group dance routines. The overall winner upon completion of the final dances is chosen by the professional jury members.

The interval act was Arne Fagerholt who performed Kjersti Alveberg's production Spirits.

== Participants and results ==
=== Final ===
Awards were given to the top three participants. The table below highlights these using gold, silver, and bronze. The placing results of the remaining participants is unknown and never made public by the European Broadcasting Union.

R/O	Country	Broadcaster	Dancer(s)	Dance	Choreographer	Result
	Denmark	DR	Rose Gad Poulsen and Nikolaj Hübbe	Divertissement from La Sylphide	A. Bournonville	1
	Switzerland	SRG SSR	Frédéric Gafner	Variation from the first act of La Sylphide	A. Bournonville	2
	West Germany	ZDF	Stefanie Arndt	Variation from Le Corsaire	M. Petipa	3
	Austria	ORF	Erika Nowak	Variation of the girl friends from Raymonda	M. Petipa and R. Nureyev	
	Netherlands	NOS; BRT	Marieke Simons and Bart de Block	Blue Bird Pas de deux from Sleeping Beauty	M. Petipa	
	Canada	CBC/Radio-Canada	Stephen Legate	Variation from La Bayadère	M. Petipa and N. Makarova	
	Finland	YLE	Susanna Aaltonen and Tomi Paasonen	Pas de deux Odette/Siegfried from the second act of Swan Lake	L. Ivanov	
	France	FR3	Marie-Soizic Cabié	Aurora's variation from the first act of Sleeping Beauty	M. Petipa	
	Italy	RAI	Giulia Menicucci	Variation from Giselle	J. Coralli and J. J. Perrot	
	Norway	NRK	Halldis Ólafsdóttir	Paper Nut	J. Day	
	Spain	TVE	María Montserrat León	Variation from Le Corsaire	M. Petipa	
	Sweden	SVT	Johannes Öhman	Franz's variation from the third act of Coppelia	K. Damianov	
	United Kingdom	BBC	Paul Liburd	Under Summer	R. Cohan	
	Yugoslavia	JRT	Vedrana Ostojic	Variation from Le Corsaire	M. Petipa	

== Jury members ==
The jury members consisted of the following:

- Italy – Paolo Bortoluzzi (Head of jury)
- Denmark – Frank Andersen
- Argentina – Oscar Araiz
- Canada – Celia Franca
- USA – Mary Hinkson
- Denmark – Mette Hønningen
- USSR – Galina Samsova
- Switzerland – Heinz Spoerli
- Spain – José de Udaeta

== Broadcasts ==
The 1987 Young Dancers competition was broadcast in at least 15 countries. Known details on the broadcasts in each country, including the specific broadcasting stations and commentators are shown in the tables below.

Broadcasters in participating countries
Country	Broadcaster	Channel(s)	Commentator(s)	Ref(s)
Austria	ORF	FS1 (Note: Deferred broadcast at 22:05 CET (21:05 UTC))		
Canada	CBC/Radio-Canada	CBC (Note: Delayed broadcast on 28 June at 14:00; contest featured in an edition of Music for a Sunday Afternoon)	Celia Franca	
Denmark	DR	DR TV	Niels Karl Nielsen	
France	FR3 (Note: Delayed two-part broadcast on 29 and 30 June at 23:30 CET and 23:20 CET respectively)		Charles Imbert	
Germany	3sat			
Germany	ZDF (Note: Deferred broadcast at 22:35 (CET))		Jens Wendland	
Netherlands	NOS	Nederland 2 (Note: Delayed broadcast on 2 June at 20:30 CET (19:30 UTC))	Joop van Zijl and Marc Jonkers	
Norway	NRK	NRK Fjernsynet	Anne Borg	
Sweden	SVT	TV2		
Switzerland	SRG SSR	TV DRS (Note: Broadcast through a second audio programme on TSR)		
Switzerland	SRG SSR	TSR	Jean-Pierre Pastori	
Switzerland	SRG SSR	TSI		
United Kingdom	BBC	BBC2	Humphrey Burton and Monica Mason	
Yugoslavia	JRT	TV Beograd 2		
Yugoslavia	JRT	TV Ljubljana 2		

== See also ==
- Eurovision Song Contest 1987
