= Beatriz Consuelo =

Brazilian dancer (1932–2013)

- Consuela, circa 1990
- Born: Beatriz Consuelo Cardoso; 23 December 1932; Porto Alegre, Rio Grande do Sul, Brazil
- Died: 7 March 2013 (aged 80); Geneva, Switzerland
- Other names: Beatriz Gafner
- Occupations: dancer, dance instructor
- Years active: 1947-2013
- Known for: Founding the Geneva Junior Ballet
- Spouse: Claude Gafner
- Children: Foofwa d'Imobilité

Beatriz Consuelo (born Beatriz Consuelo Cardoso; 23 December 1932 – 7 March 2013) was a Brazilian-Swiss ballerina and dance instructor. Consuelo received numerous awards including the Carlos Gomes Order of Cultural Merit in 1956 and the Order of Rio Branco in 1975 from Brazil. The City of Geneva Prize for the performing arts was bestowed upon her in 2003.

== Early life ==
Beatriz Consuelo Cardoso was born on 23 December 1932 in Porto Alegre, Rio Grande do Sul, Brazil. With the encouragement of her parents, she began studying dance with Antonia "Tony" Seitz Petzold a German immigrant around 1938. On 14 August 1944, Seitz organized a gala at the Théâtre São Pedro in Porto Alegre, featuring Consuelo in the lead role. For three years she continued dancing with Seitz and her reputation grew. In 1947, she was hired to dance by Count Jean de Beausacq and his wife Nina Verchinina, who was the ballet mistress at the Teatro Municipal of Rio de Janeiro.

== Career ==
Consuelo became the lead dancer at the Teatro Municipal and performed there for five years, first under the direction of Verchinina and then with Tatiana Leskova. She was recruited by dancers from the Grand Ballet of the Marquis de Cuevas, who were touring in Brazil to join them in France. In July 1953, she sailed for Marseille to join the company and auditioned in Deauville with Bronislava Nijinska. Within a year Consuelo became a soloist with the company and premiered the ballets: L'Ange Gris (1953) and Le Retour (1954) by George Skibine; Fiesta (1957) by Enrique Martínez; and Trapèze (1960) by Daniel Seillier. In 1958, she danced The Nutcracker with Serge Golovine and in 1959 earned the spot as principal dancer of the company. That year, she danced Sleepwalker with Golovine and during the 1960 to 1961 season, Consuelo returned as a guest dancer at the Teatro Municipal in Rio.

In 1961, Consuelo performed L'Oiseau bleu with Rudolf Nureyev and the following year when Cuevas dissolved the company, she joined the Grand Théâtre de Bordeaux. She premiered in Symphonie Classique with Golovine, before returning to Rio and the Teatro Municipal in the 1963 to 1964 season. At the invitation of Golovine, Consuelo joined the Ballet du Grand Théâtre de Genève in 1964. She returned as a guest dancer in the 1965 to 1966 season in Rio and then continued her career in Geneva, retiring from the stage in 1969 with the birth of her son, Frédéric Gafner.

At the invitation of George Balanchine, when he founded the dance school in 1969, Consuelo and Alfonso Catá became co-managers of the Ecole de Danse de Genève for the Grand Théâtre de Genève. In 1975, the school became private and Consuelo solely managed and operated it under the name of the Ecole de Danse de Genève. Between 1979 and 1982 in addition to running the school, Consuelo served as an instructor for the Prix de Lausanne and a jury member from 1975 to 1982 for the International Choreographic Competition held in Nyon. In 1980, she founded and became director of the Geneva Junior Ballet, training new talent and earning an international reputation for her pedagogical skill. In 1992 and 1993, she taught at National Conservatory of Music and Dance in Lyon, France. In 1999, Consuelo retired as director of the Ecole de Danse de Genève and turned over management of the Junior Ballet to Patrice Delay and Sean Wood.

== Death and legacy ==
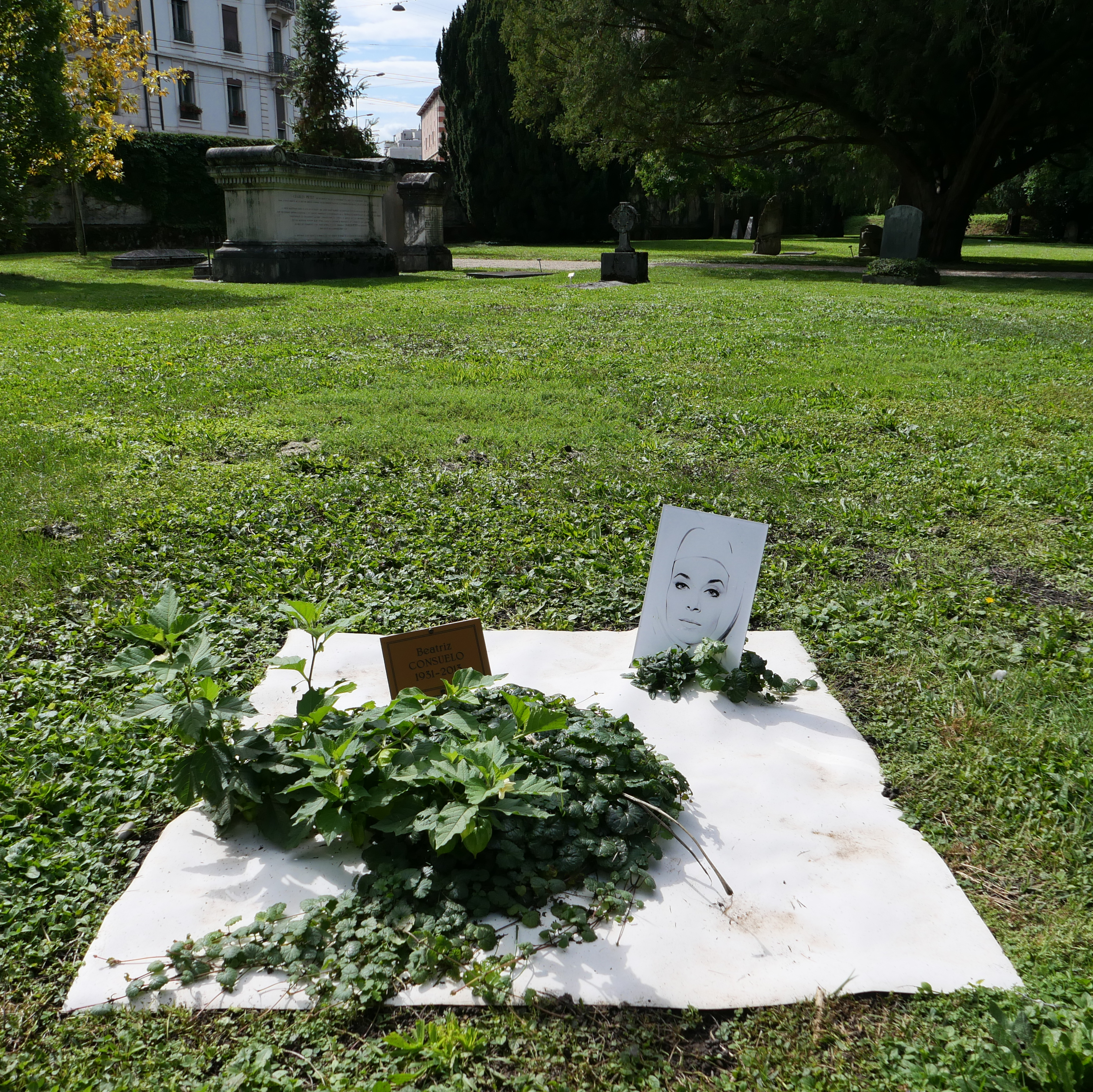
Consuelo's final resting place at the Cimetère des Rois.

Consuelo died on 7 March 2013 at the Arénières Medical Center in Geneva. She was buried on 11 March at the Cimetière de Saint-Georges, but a decade later got reburied at the Cimetière des Rois, where the right to rest is strictly limited to prominent personalities who have greatly contributed to public life in Geneva.

During her career Consuelo received numerous awards including the Carlos Gomes Order of Cultural Merit from Brazil in 1956 and was honored as a Grand Officer in the Order of Rio Branco in 1975. The City of Geneva Prize for the performing arts was bestowed upon her in 2003.

== See also ==
- Plainpalais, the district of Geneva, where she lived.
