= Renaissance Tropica =

All-electric car

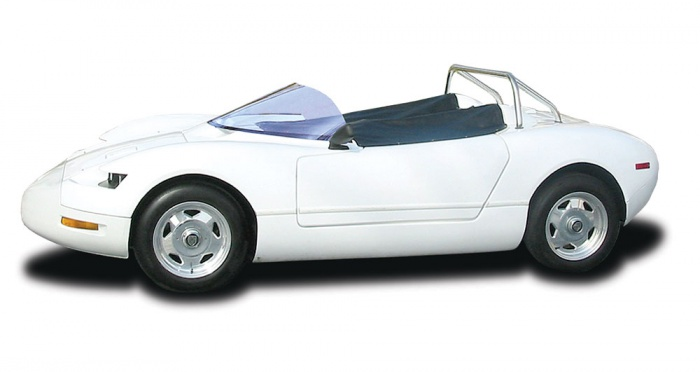
- 1995 Tropica EV Roadster, as designed by Jim Muir. Image from original Renaissance Cars company records.

Overview
- Manufacturer: Renaissance Cars
- Also called: Renaissance Cars Tropica; Tropica Roadster; Zebra Model Z Roadster; Xebra Model Z Roadster
- Production: 1995

Body and chassis
- Body style: Roadster
- Layout: Rear-motor, rear-wheel drive

Powertrain
- Electric motor: Two DC motors, 18.3 kW (24.5 bhp) each; Total maximum power: 36.5 kW (49 bhp); Total maximum continuous power: 11.2 kW (15 bhp)
- Transmission: Direct drive (separately for each rear wheel)
- Battery: 11.2 kWh lead-acid

The Tropica or Tropica Roadster is an all-electric car made by Renaissance Cars in the 1990s. It was introduced for the model year 1995 and built in a limited number of units, but never entered series production due to financial issues.

== Overview ==
Renaissance Cars was founded by Bob Beaumont, who previously founded the company which produced the Citicar in the 1970s. The company was headquartered in Palm Bay, Florida.

The Tropica Roadster was designed by Jim Muir.

== Specifications ==
The car was to use an ABS body on an aluminum backbone chassis. Although the first prototype had a fiberglass unibody, later vehicles used an aluminum chassis and a plastic body. The total weight was about 2,200 lb (998 kg) at the prototype stage, with plans to reduce it by a further 400 lb (181 kg) in the production version; the manufacturer ultimately specified the weight of the car as 1,960 lb (889 kg).

The battery capacity was about 11.2 kWh, coming from twelve 6V lead-acid batteries, each with a capacity of 156 Ah; the batteries were removable. When a prototype was tested by the Car and Driver magazine, the urban range was about 38 mi (61 km). Later owners of pre-series vehicles reported a range of about 52 mi (84 km). In 2008, a car with about 20,000 miles on its odometer had a range of 35 mi (56 km) on the freeway.

The vehicle would take 6–8 hours to fully charge, but as explained by one owner, "I can get an 85% charge in about 90 mins. The remaining 6-7 hours is used to trickle charge the rest of the battery."

The vehicle had two DC motors, one for each of the rear wheels, which eliminated the need for a differential. The vehicle had no gearbox. The maximum power output was 49 bhp, however the maximum continuous power output was merely 15 bhp, which resulted in a top speed of about 60 mph (97 km/h). It was 57 mph (92 km/h) in the Car and Driver test, while another user reported 72 mph (116 km/h).

== Production ==
The car was introduced in 1995 (although prospective customers were able to reserve it earlier). Approximately 16 pre-series Tropica Roadsters were completed with two additional near completed [but finished by successor owners], and exhibited in showrooms, with at least some of them finding customers. According to another source, the company made 25 vehicles overall, including prototypes and pilot series vehicles [three of them are frame/driveline, only]. The car did not enter series production because the second financing round failed.

In 1996, the company went into receivership and most of its assets went to a newly founded company called Zebra Motors, based first in Novato and then in Alameda, California. The company announced two models, the Model Z Roadster (which was a renamed Tropica Roadster) and the Light Delivery Van (the latter featuring a swappable battery), but these did not enter series production. The company was then bought by a group of investors reportedly including actor Don Johnson and renamed Xebra Motors. Though the group planned a limited production of the Roadster, the company ultimately failed in 2001.

The slightly modified Tropica #18 appeared as the Xebra EV starting in episodes of Nash Bridges (season 4, episode 13) through (season 5, episode 21).

One Tropica Roadster is in possession of the Route 66 Electric Vehicle Museum in Kingman, Arizona.

== Pricing ==
One user reported buying a new Tropica for $18,000. The manufacturer expected to sell it profitably for $12,500.
