= The National Ballet Academy of Amsterdam =

Ballet school in the Netherlands

The Dutch National Ballet Academy of Amsterdam (NBA) is the premier school for classical ballet in the Netherlands. Young talented dancers receive a ballet education at what critics say is the highest level. The NBA brings ballet dancers up to the professional standard that is required by top international ballet companies such as the Dutch National Ballet.

== History ==
The Dutch National Ballet Academy of the Netherlands started as an amateur school in 1968 run by ballet dancer, Nel Roos. She offered the first full-time ballet curriculum in the Netherlands and "delivered" dancers to the Dutch ballet companies through the establishment of a "selection class" of the best students.

For Nel Roos, the ballet technique was paramount. As her students said: "The approach was very strict, very rigid, with many rules."

The academy successfully pleaded for an earlier start of the program, so that children could be admitted at an early age. A partnership was started with public schools in Amsterdam. As the Netherlands did not have its own classical dance tradition, the Nel Roos Academy adopted the Russian Vaganova technique as its teaching method. The academy was officially renamed the National Ballet Academy in 1988. The collaboration with the National Ballet was greatly strengthened. The National Ballet was also involved in the academy's recruitment policy and developed a training program for teachers, in which (ex-) dancers of the company are trained in teaching young ballet students.

The academy has since been run by the following people: Erna Droog, Francis Sinceretti, Joanne Zimmerman, Simon De Mowbray, Vicki Summers, Hlif Svavarsdottir Christopher Powney, Jean-Yves Esquerre.

In September 2018, Ernst Meisner was appointed interim artistic director for the Dutch National Ballet Academy of Amsterdam.

The Dutch National Ballet Academy is the only ballet school in the Netherlands affiliated to the internationally acclaimed Dutch National Ballet and its Junior Company.

Hans van Manen, one of the world's most influential choreographers and Ted Brandsen, artistic director of the Dutch National Ballet, respectively hold the positions of Honorary Patron and Artistic Advisor of the Dutch National Ballet Academy.

NBA students participate in some of the Dutch National Ballet's major productions, such as Swan Lake, Sleeping Beauty, Coppelia, The Nutcracker, Don Quixote and Romeo and Juliet. NBA's end of the year performance, Dansers van Morgen, takes place at the Nationale Opera & Ballet, home of the Dutch National Ballet and its Junior Company.

In 2020, K-pop star Kazuha from Le Sserafim attended this ballet school before being recruited by the CEO of Source Music in mid-2021. Kazuha herself revealed that she doesn't speak Dutch.

== Artistic directors ==
- Erna Droog (1987-1991)
- Francis Sinceretti (1991–2001)
- Joanne Zimmerman (2001–2002)
- Simon de Mowbray (2002–2007)
- Vicki Summers (2007–2009)
- Hlif Svavarsdottir (2009–2010)
- Christopher Powney (2010–2014)
- Jean-Yves Esquerre (2014–2018)
- Ernst Meisner (2018–2025)
- Dario Elia (2025-present)

== The educational programme ==
=== The pre-NBA course ===
A two-year programme for children age 8 to 10 offering ballet and folk dance once or twice a week.

==== Pre-NBA 1 (third grade primary school) ====
In pre-NBA 1 children receive a classical ballet lesson every Saturday and a world dance lesson in the building of the National Ballet Academy on the Agamemnonstraat in Amsterdam. The course gives children the opportunity to get acquainted with the more professional character of the ballet lessons at the National Ballet Academy.

==== Pre-NBA 2 (fourth grade primary school) ====
In pre-NBA 2, the training becomes more intensive, with the schedule expanding to twice a week. On Saturday mornings, there is a classical ballet class and world dance on the program. On Wednesday afternoons, students have a classical ballet class and body conditioning. The lessons take place in the building of the National Ballet Academy on the Agamemnonstraat in Amsterdam. The course runs from September to February.

Children from pre-NBA 2 are not automatically admitted to National Ballet Academy. They must first follow an audition course to prepare them for the final audition. Children who pass the final audition are admitted to the first year of the National Ballet Academy and leave their previous school.

=== The Preliminary Course ===
Children are a young as nine years old when they start the Preliminary Course of the National Ballet Academy, and if they are qualified they will stay for seven or eight years. The students follow a schedule in which normal schooling and ballet education are combined. The academy works together with two schools in Amsterdam: the Olympia School (primary education) and the Gerrit van der Veen College (secondary education).

During the NBA education the pupils receive a daily class of traditional dance technique. They also receive lessons in spitz technique (for the girls), jumping technique and strength training (for the boys), repertoire, pas de deux, caractère and modern dance. They also perform in performances of the Dutch National Ballet. The children are taught at the Agamemnonstraat facility during the first three years and then transfer to the College for Theater and Dance at the Jodenbreestraat.

In the final year of the program, the last year of secondary education, most students audition for the Bachelor of Arts Programme of the National Ballet Academy.

=== Bachelor of Arts Programme ===
The students who are selected for the Bachelor of Arts Program focus fully on ballet for three years. They train every day to perfect their dance technique and will also follow classes in dance history, musical theory, anatomy and injury prevention. During the BA programme the dancers will also gain their first professional experience during a practical internship with one of the major dance ensembles in Holland or abroad. During the BA course the students will start to audition with ballet companies.
