= Bob Beaumont =

Manufacture of CitiCar, an electric car in the 1970s

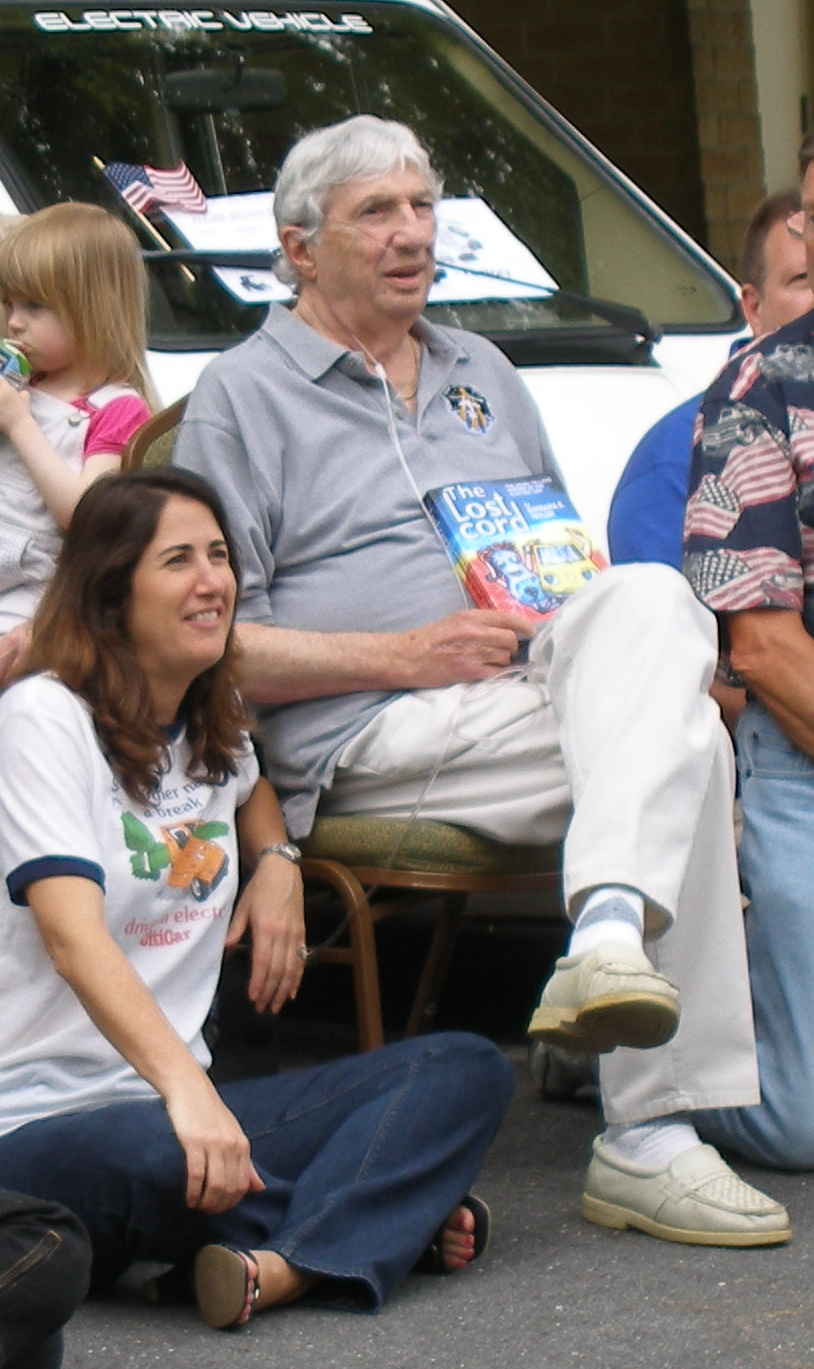
Robert Gerald (Bob) Beaumont and his daughter Dina in 2009, attending the first C-Car Gathering in Columbia, MD.

Robert Gerald Beaumont (April 1, 1932 – October 24, 2011) was the founder of Sebring-Vanguard a Florida-based company that produced the Citicar, an electric automobile manufacturer from 1974 to 1977. He was born in Teaneck, New Jersey and attended Hartwick College after serving in the United States Air Force.

== Career ==
Beaumont was the owner of a Chrysler dealership in upstate New York. In the early 70's, he moved to Sebring, Florida, where he founded Vanguard Vehicles, later named Sebring Vanguard where the CitiCar was produced. Nearly 2,300 Citicars were built and sold, many of which are still in use today. Sebring-Vanguard closed in 1977 with most of the assets sold to Frank Flower who formed a new company called Commuter Vehicles, Inc. to continue production of his re engineered Commuter-Car version from 1979 to 1982. After the closing of Sebring-Vanguard, Beaumont moved to the Washington D.C area in order to lobby and promote electric vehicles. Later he established a used automobile dealership outside Columbia, Maryland. In the early 1990s with the California emissions regulations looming, Beaumont formed Renaissance Cars, Inc. and created the all-electric Tropica.

== Death ==
Beaumont died October 24, 2011, at his home in Columbia, Maryland.

== Sources ==
- Robert G. Beaumont Designer of the Citicar
- The Lost Cord by Barbara Taylor Published 1995. ISBN 978-1-57074-295-8 ISBN 1570742952
