= Citicar =

1974 electric car

CitiCar
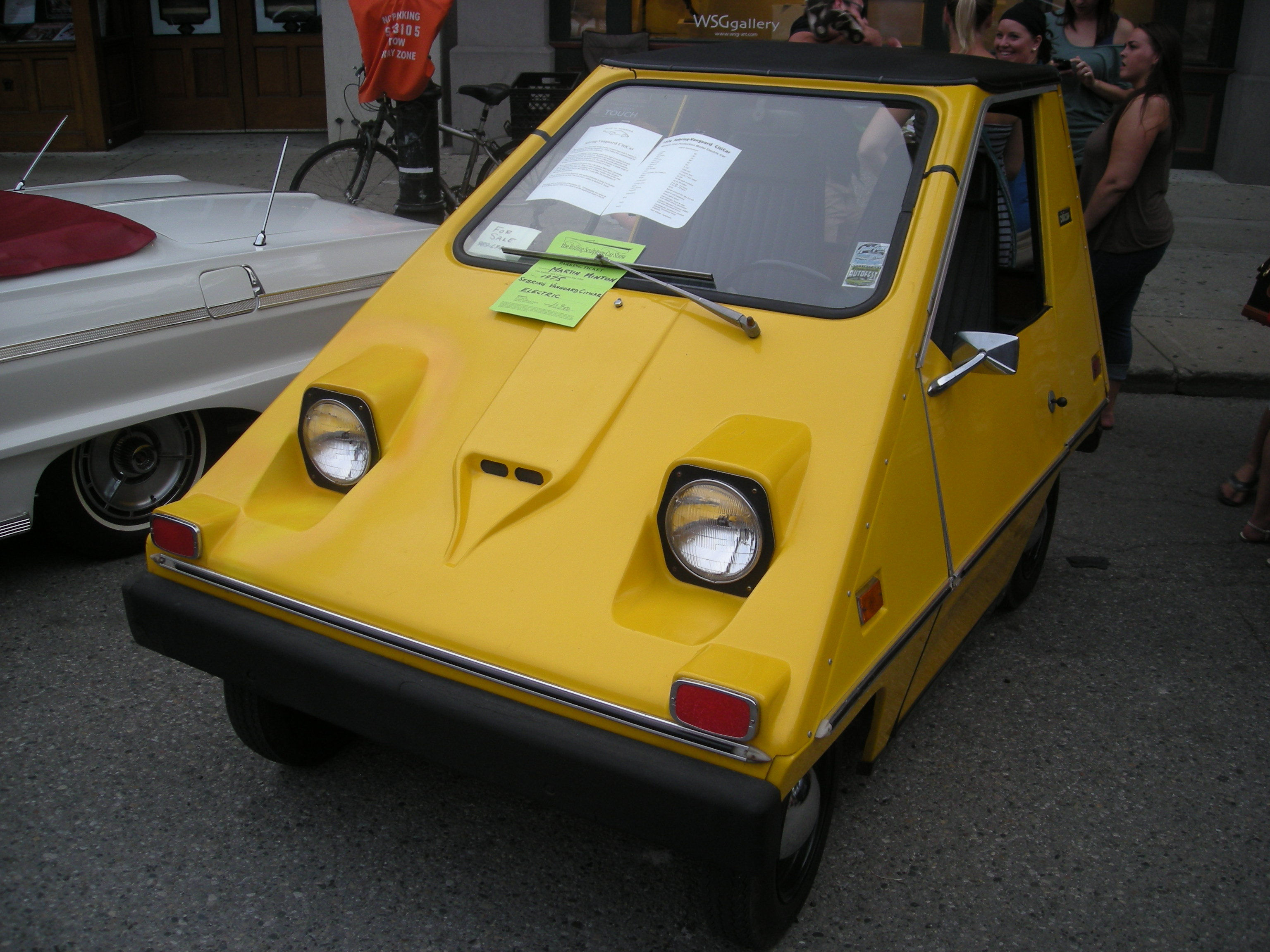
- A Citicar from 1975

Overview
- Manufacturer: Sebring-Vanguard
- Also called: Comuta-Car; Comuta-Van
- Production: 1974–1977
- Designer: Robert G. Beaumont (President of Sebring Vanguard)

Body and chassis
- Class: Battery Electric
- Body style: 2-door 2-seat

Powertrain
- Electric motor: GE Series DC motor; 2.5 HP (early), 3.5 HP, or 6 HP (late); Battery type: 6 X 6v or 8 X 6v lead-acid

Dimensions
- Length: 2,437 mm (95.9 in)
- Width: 1,397 mm (55.0 in)
- Height: 1,524 mm (60.0 in)
- Curb weight: 591 kg (1,303 lb)

Chronology
- Successor: Comuta-Car and variants 1979 – 1982

The CitiCar is a car produced from 1974 to 1977 by Sebring, Florida–based Sebring-Vanguard, Inc. After being bought out by Commuter Vehicles, Inc, Sebring-Vanguard produced the similar Comuta-Car and Comuta-Van from 1979 to 1982. Similarities to its exterior design can be spotted in the Danish Kewet and the later Norwegian Buddy electric car. Accounting for all CitiCar variants, a total of 4,444 units were produced up to 1979, the most since 1945 for an electric car assembled in North America until surpassed in 2011 by the Nissan Leaf.

== History ==
Inspired by Club Car's golf cart design and partly in response to the 1970s fuel crisis, a company called Sebring-Vanguard produced its first electric vehicle, the Vanguard Coupe (sometimes referred to as the EV Coupe), in 1974. Company founder and President Robert G. Beaumont, working with designer Jim Muir, came up with the CitiCar after this earlier EV Coupe was not an immediate success. This second attempt was still based on a lot of the Club Car's mechanical features, though.

Produced in its plant in Sebring, Florida, the CitiCar was a small wedge-shaped electric vehicle. Early versions had no extra features and can be considered an experiment in minimalist automotive design; it was as basic a people mover as could be bought at the time. By 1976, enough CitiCars were produced to promote Sebring-Vanguard to the position of being the U.S. #6 auto manufacturer after GM, Ford, Chrysler, AMC, and Checker Motors Corporation; but ahead of Excalibur and Avanti Motors. Production of the CitiCar continued until 1977 with about 2,300 CitiCars produced.

Commuter Vehicles, Inc. purchased the CitiCar design, and renamed the vehicle Comuta-Car. Production of this upgraded version began in 1979 and Commuter Vehicles, Inc. produced an estimated 2,144 Comuta-Cars and Vans.

== Models ==
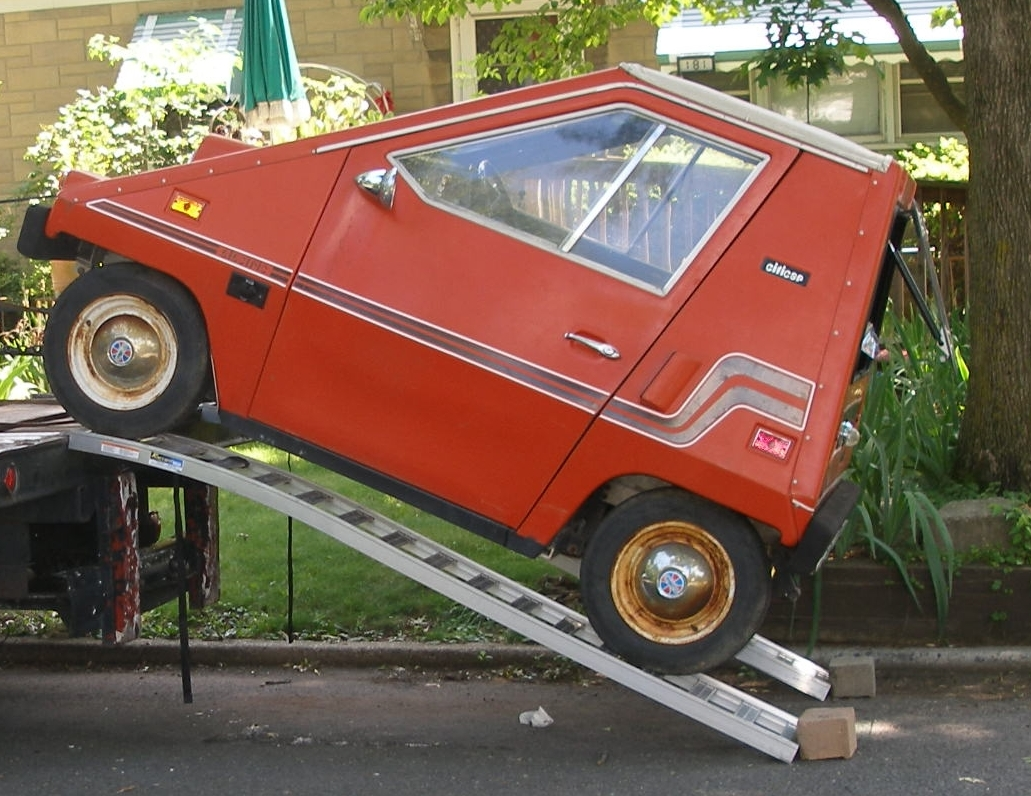
1977 CitiCar

The CitiCar came in three models. All three models had a flat diagonal front, a flat roof, and a flat nearly vertical back. Early coupes, designated as model SV-36, had a 2.5 hp (1.9 kW) motor and 36V battery pack. The second model coupes, designated as model SV-48, had a 3.5 hp (2.6 kW) motor and 48V battery pack, and some small improvements. During the last years of production, the third model variant of the Citicar, sometimes referred to as a Transitional CitiCar or 1976 1/2 model, had an improved drive train with a 6 hp (4.5 kW) motor, and the body was changed slightly to incorporate heater inlet vents on the side of the vehicle and some had the improved door style with better latches and permanently installed sliding windows.

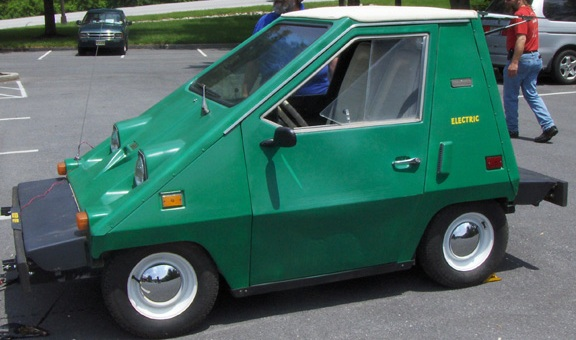
A ComutaCar. Bumper extensions were added in later models to meet evolving US government regulatory standards

The later Comuta-Car, produced by Commuter Vehicles, Inc., retained all of the Transitional CitiCar changes including the larger 6 HP motor and drive train arrangement, but moved the batteries from under the seat to battery boxes behind the bumpers, making the vehicle about 16 inches (410 mm) longer than the 8-foot (2.4 m) long CitiCar. ComutaCars also incorporated additional frame supports to meet the new DOT standards. One of these supports created the center-console-like rug-covered divider between the driver and passenger.

The CitiVan, was a limited production extended-wheelbase version of the third model variant of the CitiCar. Produced and sold from 1977 (by Sebring-Vanguard) to 1979 (by Commuter Vehicles, Inc.), basically unchanged. It is rumored that only 11 of these smaller Vans were built and sold as the CitiVan but an unknown more were built and sold in 1979 as the first year Comuta-Van. The main design differences between the 1979 Comuta-Van and the later Postal Comuta-Van is that the much smaller 1979 Comuta-Van has swing-out side-doors and a hatchback window. The much larger Postal Comuta-Van has sliding side doors and a swing out rear entrance door.

Another CitiCar variant was called the Postal Comuta-Van. These were all right-hand-drive vehicles, initially built as a government contract with the United States Postal Service by Commuter Vehicles, Inc. To make a Comuta-Van to meet government standards, the overall length was increased to 142 in (3,607 mm), as well as a 12 hp (8.9 kW) motor, 72V battery pack, and 3-speed transmission, among other additions. The Postal version was only equipped with one 'right hand' drivers seat. However, some were sold to the public with an additional passenger seat and much more room for storage behind the seats. It was the only model with a front hood access and sliding side doors. All vehicles were built with space frames made from welded aircraft grade aluminum tube and ABS plastic bodies. They all had solid axles with leaf spring suspension front and rear. Top speeds were about 30 mph (48 km/h) – 50 mph (80 km/h), and range was up to 40 miles (64 km) per charge.

=== Specifications ===
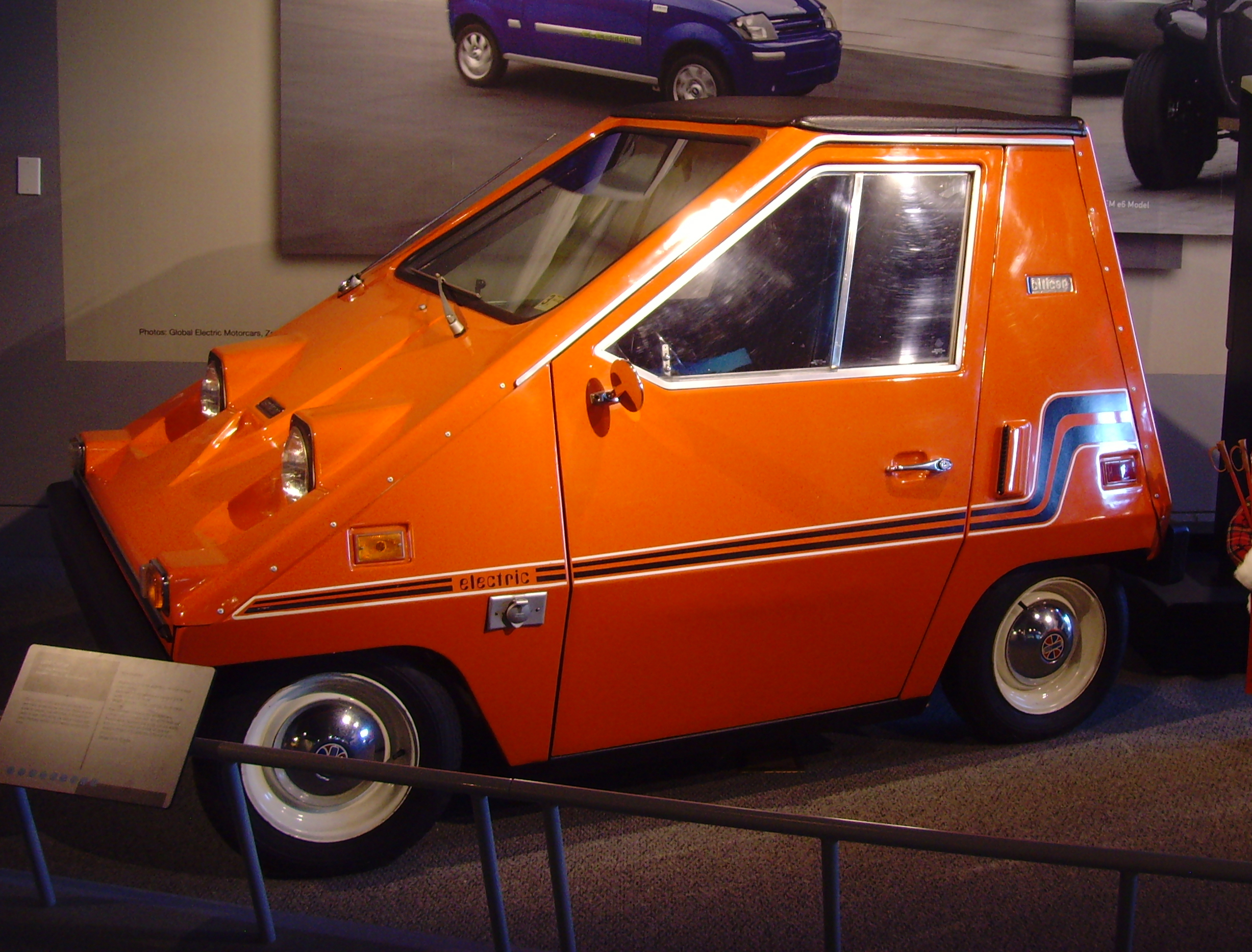
A Citicar from 1976

The second model of the CitiCar (SV-48):

- Length: 95 in (2,413 mm)
- Width: 55 in (1,397 mm)
- Wheelbase: 63 in (1,600 mm)
- Height: 58 in (1,473 mm)
- Front track: 43 in (1,092 mm)
- Rear track: 44 in (1,118 mm)
- Clearance: 5.5 in (140 mm)
- Weight: 1,250 lb (570 kg)
- Rear Storage: 12 cu ft (340 L)

Citicar (1976) Classic-Gala 2022 1X7A0361 in its classic orange colorway from the front.

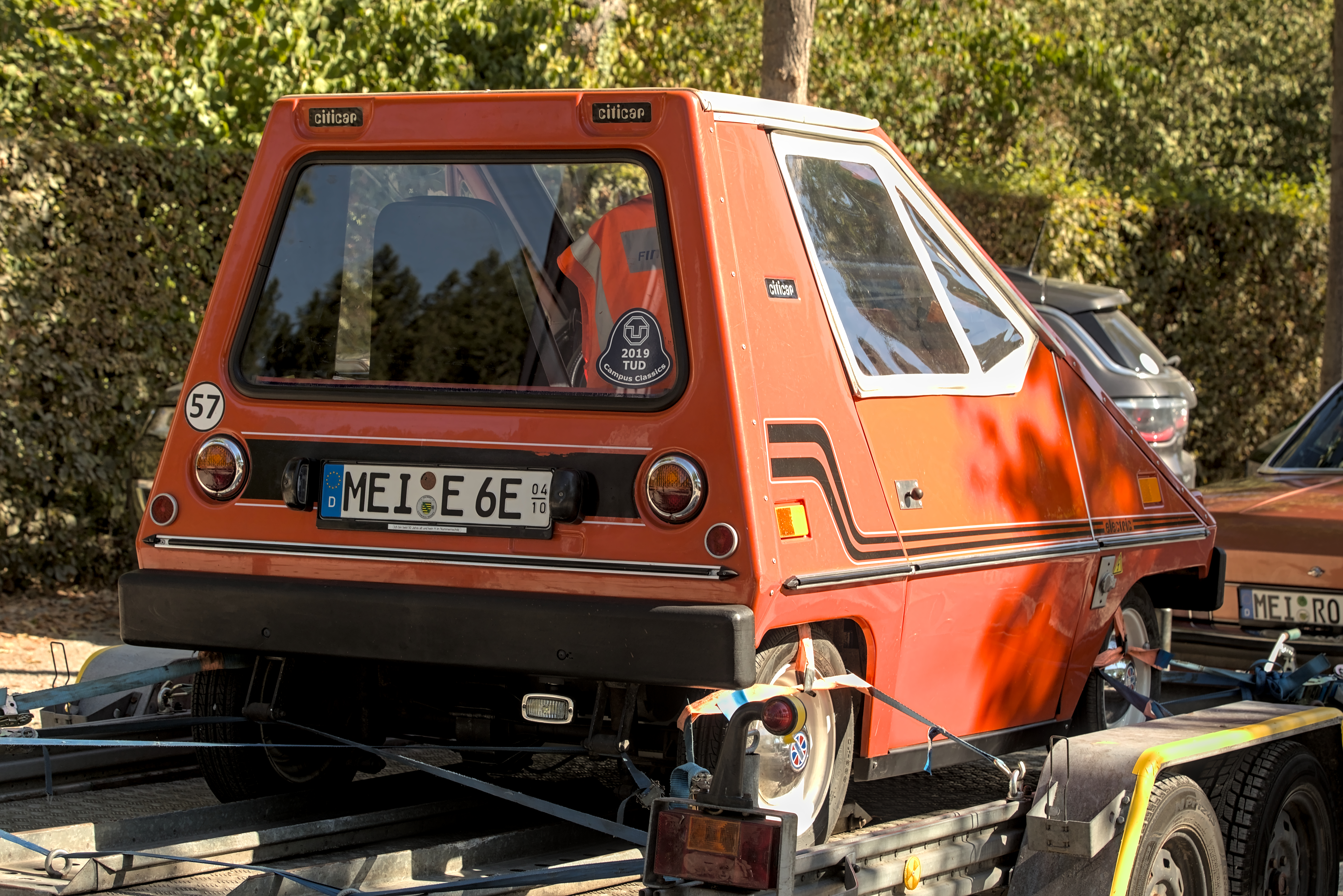
- Citicar (1976) Classic-Gala 2022 1X7A0361 in its classic orange colorway from the rear.
  Tires: 4.80 x 12, 4 ply rated or optional 135R12 radials
- Speed: 38 mph (61 km/h)

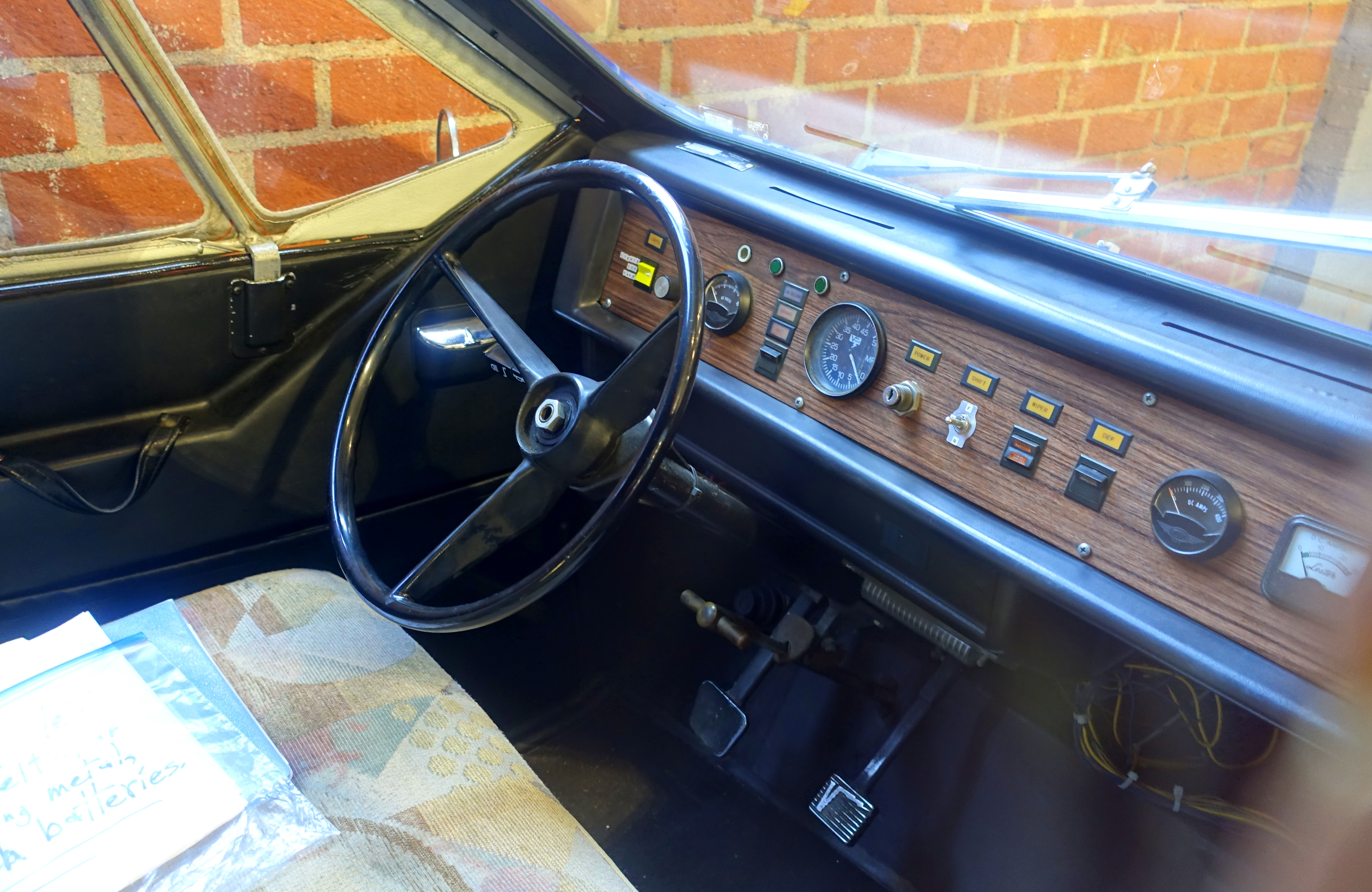
1975 CitiCar interior

The top speed of any particular C-Car will vary somewhat depending on many factors, including: tire pressure, vehicle weight, alignment, brake drag, windows open/closed, transaxle oil viscosity, temperature, chemistry, age, condition of the batteries, force of possible headwinds/tailwinds, etc. These factors can make some C-Cars a bit faster or slower than others. Approximate top speeds expected with a Citicar on level ground:

- 36V – 25 to 28 mph (40 to 45 km/h) (original SV-36 – six 6v batteries)
- 48V – 34–38 mph (55–61 km/h) (original SV-48 – eight 6v batteries)
- Range: Approximately 40 mi (64 km).
- Acceleration: 0 to 25 in 6.2 seconds
- Turning Circle: 22 ft (6.7 m)
- Controller: Vanguard Multivoltage Speed Control. Three step contactor control system. First – about 10 mph (16 km/h), second – about 20 mph (32 km/h), third – about 38 mph.
- Motor: Series wound DC 3.5 hp
- Transaxle: Direct Gear Drive – Terrell 7.125:1 reduction ratio
- Suspension: leaf springs, front and rear. four wheel shock absorbers
- Body: Impact Resistant Cycolac (ABS plastic) Corrosion and Rust proof
- Frame: Rectangular aluminum chassis, tubular aluminum body support
- Brakes: four wheel – front disk. rear drum – parking. Later SV-48 models had 4-wheel drum brakes.
- Power Source: eight 6-volt flooded lead-acid batteries

== History of upgrades and changes to the CitiCar by serial number ==
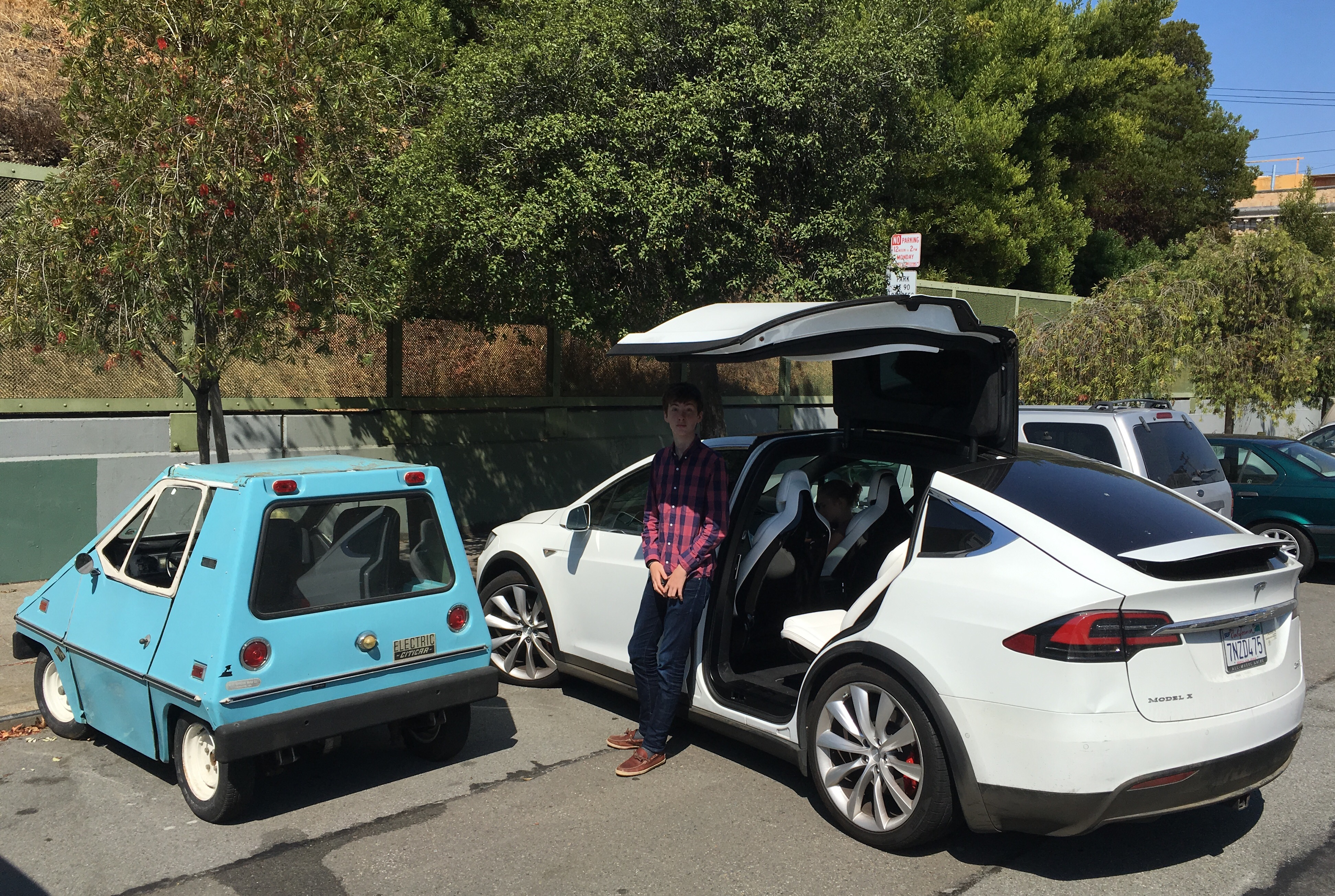
A Citicar by the side of a modern all-electric Tesla Model X (right). Accounting all variants, the Citicar had the record for most production of electric cars from an American manufacturer since 1945 until surpassed by the Tesla Model S.

(Note – This is a compilation of CitiCar factory changes from 1974 to 1977; with some Comuta-Car information added. The information is gisted from the owners and service manuals, and the CitiCar Roster.)

Prior to car #1501, CitiCars left the factory as 36 volt models; most had a 2.5 hp Baldor motor, but a few had the 3.5 hp GE motor.

In December 1974, CitiCar number #1501 (124SR1501) was the first factory-built 48 volt CitiCar. These vehicles were designated as model SV-48, compared to the earlier SV-36. All CitiCars made after this vehicle were produced as 48 volt models with the newer 3.5 hp GE series motor. (Note: A number of the earlier SV-36 models were returned to the factory or to dealerships in order to upgrade to the 48 volt system.)

CitiCar #1751 (March 1975) saw a number of changes to the assembly line. Here is a list of changes at car #1751 –

- Dual master cylinder (was non-redundant single cylinder).
- Electric defroster. On earlier cars, the defroster -switch- was installed per federal regulations but not wired to anything. A 'defogger' element was made available as a dealer option sometime in late 1974 and was normally connected to the otherwise inoperative defroster switch.
- A self-canceling Lucas turn signal actuator was installed. In previous vehicles it was a Signal Stat 900 non-self canceling type.

The turn signal switch change required a number of other changes –

- Turn signal mounted high beam switch (was a floor mounted high beam switch).
- Horn voltage decreased to 12v (put back to 18v at car 2584).
- Horn switch moved to Lucas signal lever (was on center of steering wheel).

In addition, there were a number of technical improvements –

- To improve ground reliability, the controller was grounded to the chassis at the right rear wheel well.
- Dash switch for wipers replaced by one with improved quality.
- Chassis ground wire: a larger diameter wire was installed. The previous wire was too small (16 gauge) and would melt during battery charge.
- Hot lamp wire color changed to yellow (was green).

After the changes at car #1751, there was a minor glitch noted in the service manual. Since a lamp was removed from the instrument panel, there were fewer lamps, and the dimmer would not allow the lamps to go all the way off.

Before car #2011 (May 1975), the CitiCar had front disc brakes. Cars #2011 and after had drum brakes.

On car #2080 (May 1975), the parking brake micro switch was moved to a different position, and was actuated by a plastic collar instead of a detent on the parking brake shaft.

On car #2211 (July 1975), a switch was added to the dual master cylinder along with a small PC board behind the dash to warn of problems with brake hydraulics, as well as indicating if the parking brake is engaged. Before #2211, the brake lamp was a parking brake engaged indicator only.

Prior to car #2426 (September 1975) the accelerator was returned to off via a single accelerator spring. Sebring-Vanguard issued a Service Note to modify all previous vehicles to add another spring. After #2426, a dual spring accelerator pedal was standard.

Around December 1975 there was another major change in the CitiCar assembly line. All CitiCars #2781 and higher were equipped with a 5.17:1 ratio Dana/Spicer rear axle and a 6 hp GE motor. There was an optional 'hilly' Dana/Spicer axle with a higher 6.83:1 ratio also available for these cars which allowed better hill climbing performance, but at the cost of a slightly lower top speed. These vehicles are also known as 'Transitional' Citicars.

Additional changes with car #2781 –

- Heater vents on side of car.
- 7" rear brake drums (now same as front).
- Factory heat was standard on Dana axle vehicles.
- The defroster switch was moved from the dashboard to the heater panel mounted below the dashboard. The heater panel contained 2 knobs and 1 switch. Prior to vehicle #2781, heat was a dealer-installed option, and used a two-knob panel.

On car #2842 (December 1975), a micro switch was added to the foot brake to prevent the accelerator from functioning when the brake was pressed.

On car #2854 (December 1975), the horn voltage was increased back to 18v.

CitiCar frame numbers are believed to start at 1001, and end around 3000. To May 2013 the lowest CitiCar frame number known to exist was #1040, and the highest CitiCar frame number known to exist was #2998. The small number of CitiVans produced used a separate serial number sequence.

The Comuta-Cars produced as 1979 models share the VIN arrangement of earlier CitiCars, but end with an 'A' suffix. These "A" model vehicle frame numbers were interspersed within the CitiCar series between 2000 and 2300, but do not appear to duplicate any CitiCar production. There is speculation that these frames may have been unsold dealer stock that was included in the bankruptcy sale to Commuter Vehicles, Inc. Model 'A' Comuta-Cars are configured like other Comuta-Cars (batteries in bumpers, Dana axle, heater vents, sliding windows, etc.) Some Transitional CitiCars produced after June 1976 have serial numbers ending with the "A" suffix as well. It is believed that these also may have been unsold earlier dealer stock, that was upgraded to the 1976 1/2 Transitional Model standards (Dana axle, heater vents, sliding windows, etc.)

Although production of the CitiCar stopped in 1977, and production of the Comuta-Car stopped in 1982, a Service Bulletin was issued in September 1984 to change the 3-speed contactor setup for a solid state controller.

There are some indications that after January 1982, a few Comuta-Cars may have been sold as home assembly kits for off-road or to be registered as Home Built EV's in the buyer's state.

The last known Comuta vehicle to be factory built was a special order 72 V DC Pick-Up in 1986. This vehicle was sold without a serial number and only lacked windshield wipers and directional signals to meet DOT road worthiness.

== See also ==
- Electric car use by country
- List of modern production plug-in electric vehicles
- Plug-in electric vehicles
- Bond Bug
