= Bart de Block =

Belgian ballet dancer

Bart de Block (born 22 October 1968 in Ghent) is a professional Belgian ballet dancer known for his pointework. He is also a ballet teacher (pointwork, pas-de-deux), choreographer and balletmaster.

== Personal life ==
Bart de Block was born on 22 October 1968 in Gent, Belgium. His mother was a nursing supervisor and his father was a schoolmaster. Both his brother and sister are now engineers.

Noticing a strong ability to move to music, his mother encouraged him to take dance lessons locally at age 9. His teacher suggested that his ability could be improved in Antwerp at the Academy of Royal Ballet of Flanders, which he joined at 11. He would later leave it at age 18, having pursued an advanced ballet course including three years of Graham technique, classical dance, and, of course, regular academic courses. He won several medals in Lausanne, Jackson Mississippi, and Houlgate and earned a High school diploma from the Stedelijk Institute in Antwerp (now known as Royal Balletschool of Antwerp).

== Career ==
1986–1987 Royal Ballet of Flanders, Antwerp, Belgium as a member of the "corps de ballet"

1987–1995 Deutsche Oper Berlin, Berlin, Germany as the principal dancer, working with, most notably: Maurice Béjart, Marc Bogaerts, Valery Panov, Sir Kenneth McMillan, John Neumeier, Peter Schaufuss, Karole Armitage, Bill T. Jones, Moses Pendleton, Stephen Petronio, Nacho Duato, Christopher Bruce, Lucinda Childs – guest with the Kirov ballet, St-Petersburg, dancing Albrecht in Giselle

1995–1997 Ballet Trockadero, New-York, USA as the principal dancer

1997–1999 Mark Baldwin Dance Company, London, England as the principal dancer but also as the director's assistant

1999–2001 Royal Ballet of Flanders, Antwerp, Belgium as the principal dancer and also as an administration member

2002–2003 Jeugd & Dans Company, Antwerp, Belgium as the artistic coordinator

2003–2007 Les Ballets Gradiva, New York, USA as a guest

== Principal roles ==
- Agon – (Balanchine) in the First pas de deux
- Cinderella – (Valery Panov) as the Prince
- Cruel Garden – (Christopher Bruce) as Negro
- Duende – (Nacho Duato) in the Principal role
- Different Drummer – (Sir K.MacMillan) as Jesus
- Einhorn – (John Neuemeier) in the title role
- Flowerfestival – (A.Bournonville) in the pas de deux
- Firebird – (M .Bejart) in the title role
- Five Tangos – (Hans van Manen) in the Principal role
- Folk Tale – (P.Schaufuss) in the Title role
- Four Temperaments – (G.Balanchine) as the Phlegmatic
- Galaperformance – (A. Tudor) as one of the French couple
- Giselle – (P.Schaufuss) as Albrecht
- La Fille mal Gardee – in the Principale role
- La Valse – (G.Balanchine) as the soloist
- Land – (C.Bruce) in the Principal role
- Laytext – (S.Petronio) in the Principal role
- Le Corsaire – performing a mixed Pas de deux
- Leaves are fading – (A. Tudor) in the Principal role
- Le Sacre du Printemps – (M.Bejart) as the young warrior
- Les Intermittences du Coeur – (R. Petit) as a Young Proust and Morel
- Liebestod – (V.Panov) in the Title role
- Moves – (V.Panov) as Michael Jackson
- Notre Dame de Paris – (R.Petit) as Frollo
- Onegin – (J.Cranko) as Lenski
- Percussion for six men – (V.Nebrada) in the Bongo variation
- Paquita – (Vinogradov) in the Principal role
- Petruschka – (M.Fokine) in the Title role
- Petruschka – (H.Mandafounis) in the Title role
- Ring um den Ring – (M.Bejart) as Loge
- Romeo and Juliet – (V.Panov) as Mercutio
- Sleeping Beauty – (P.Schaufuss) as Carabosse
- Swanlake – (K.MacMillan) as a Neapolitan
- Swanlake – (P.Schaufuss) as Rothbart
- Swansong – (C.Bruce) in the Principal role
- Symphony in C – (G.Balanchine) in the First & Third
- Tannhauser – (V.Panov) in the Pas de deux
- The dog is us – (K.Armitage) in the Principal role
- The Dream is over – (C.Bruce) as John Lennon
- The Idiot – (V.Panov) as Ganja
- Theme and Variations – (G.Balanchine) in the Principal role
- The Opening – (B.T.Jones) in the Principal role
- Tschaikowsky pas de deux – (G.Balanchine)
- Tutuguri – (Moses Pendleton) in the Title role
- Who Cares! – (G.Balanchine) in the Principal role
- The Legend of Joseph – (Mark Baldwin) in the Principal role
- Tango Fiesta – (Maurizio Weinrot) in the Principal role
- The Nutcracker – (A. Prokovsky) as the Prince
- The Emperor's Dream – (Mark Bogaerts) as The Emperor
- Carmina Burana – (Maurizio Weinrot) in the principal role

== Roles "en pointe" ==
Ballet repertoire in point shoes

- M-Piece – (Mark Baldwin) – Solo
- Song of a Nightingale – (Mark Baldwin) in the title role
- The Demon – (Mark Baldwin) in the title role
- Sleeping Beauty – (Peter Schaufuss) as Carabosse
- The Dog is us – (Karole Armitage) in the principal role
- Swan Lake – (After Petipa) as Odette
- Swan Lake – (After Petipa) as Odile
- Grand pas Classique – (Victor Gsovsky)
- Paquita – (E.Kunikova after Petipa) in the principal role
- Stars and Stripes – (Robert Lafosse) in the principal role
- Star Spangled Ballerina – (Marcus Galante) in the principal role
- Nutcracker – (V.Trevino after Petipa) as the Sugar Plum fairy
- Near the Middle – (V.Trevino after Forsythe) in the principal role
- Satanella – (M.Petipa) pas de deux
