= Nathalie Nordquist =

Swedish ballerina

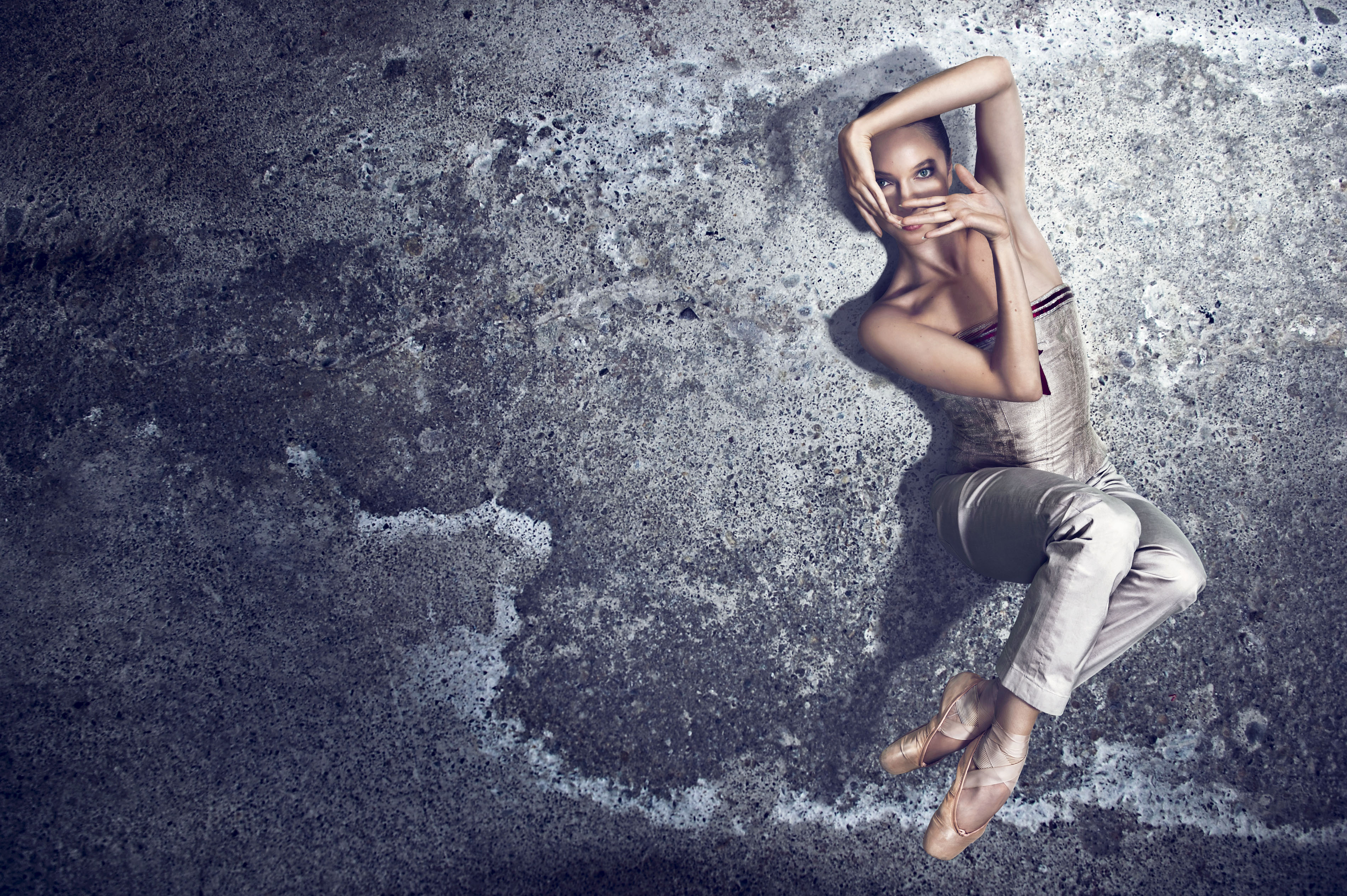
- Nathalie Nordquist in 2010.
- Born: Stockholm, Sweden
- Years active: 1998–present
- Awards: Eurovision Young Dancers (Sweden), 1st place (1999); Eurovision Young Dancers (European finals), silver medal (1999)
- Website: http://www.nathalienordquist.com

Nathalie Nordquist is a Swedish ballerina, who has performed major roles in many renowned ballet companies, including the Royal Swedish Ballet, the Royal Danish Ballet, Les Ballets de Monte Carlo, and The Australian Ballet.

== Biography ==
Nathalie Nordquist was born in Stockholm, to an American mother and Swedish father. She began dancing when she was just four years old, and enrolled in the Royal Swedish Ballet School at age ten. After training at the school for nine years, Nordquist was invited to join the Royal Swedish Ballet in 1998, She was promoted to soloist in 2001, and principal dancer in 2005. In 1999, after winning first place in Sweden's division, Nordquist went on to place second in the Eurovision Contest for Young Dancers European finals, winning a silver medal.

From 2007 until 2010, Nordquist joined Les Ballets de Monte Carlo, and toured at least twenty countries, including the U.S., Canada, Japan, Korea, China, and most of Europe.

She resumed her association with the Royal Swedish Ballet in 2010, and in 2011 she danced the pas de deux from Le Spectre de la Rose at the International Ballet Gala in Dortmund. Reviewers called it "a highlight of the evening."

Notable Roles

Notable roles include Clara in The Nutcracker, Aurora in Sleeping Beauty, the title role in Manon, the title role in Cinderella, Hermia in A Midsummer Night's Dream, Gamzatti in La Bayadère, Lise in La fille mal gardée, and Swanhilde in Coppélia.

Nordquist's most famous role was Odette/Odile in the Royal Ballet's 2001 production of Swan Lake, with choreography by Sir Peter Wright. A live performance was recorded on DVD (in collaboration with the BBC), and sold worldwide. The newspaper Svenska Dagbladet wrote of her performance: "She embodies the romantic ideal woman, vulnerable and with melancholic pleading arms... That she masters an entirely different aspect as well, is seen in her convincing portrayal of Odile...she dances a modern 'femme fatale' unbeatable!"
