= Kewet =

Three seat short range electric car

Kewet was the brand name of a battery electric vehicle. Since 2007, it has been manufactured under the name Buddy by Elbil Norge in Oslo, Norway. From inception in 1991 through October 2013, total combined sales of the Kewet and Buddy totaled approximately 1,500 units, mainly in Norway. It is similar to the Citicar of the 1970s.

== History ==
In 1971, Knud Erik Westergaard started KEW Industries in Hadsund, Denmark. The company produced industrial washing equipment and high pressure cleaners. In 1988, this company was sold, and Westergaard founded Kewet (Knud Erik Westergaard Elektrisk Transport) to produce electric cars. In 1991, the first cars emerged from the production facilities. In 1995, production was moved to Nordhausen in the former East Germany. But this move was unsuccessful. Kewet went bankrupt in 1998. In August 1998, Kewet International was formed. Shortly thereafter, rights to the Kewet vehicle were transferred to the Norwegian company, Kollega Bil A/S, which changed its name to Elbil Norge AS. Currently, Kewet Service provides spare parts and repairs Kewet vehicles in Denmark, while Consys develops various systems for electric vehicles.

== Models ==
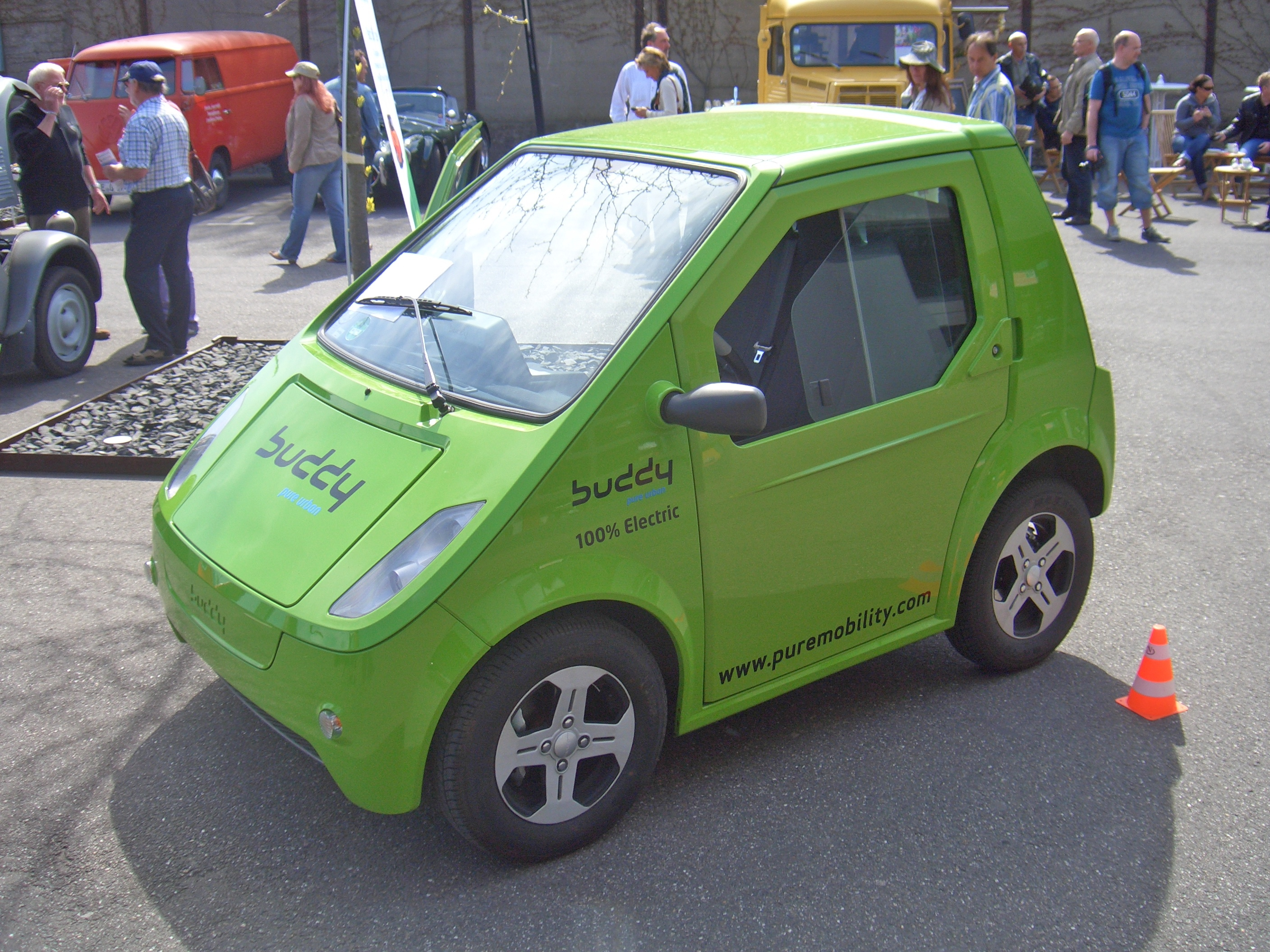
Buddy/Model 6

Six generations of the Kewet were produced:

- Models 1 and 2 used 48 volt systems, 5 kW motors equipped with a four-speed manual transmission.
- Model 3 was equipped with a 48 volt system, a 7.5 kW motor and a single-speed transmission.
- Model 4 used 60 volt systems and a 10 kW motor.
- Model 5 used 72 volt systems with a 12 kW motor. It was also available as a van.
- Model 6 (Buddy) uses 72 volt systems with a 13 kW motor.

The car seats three, has a range of typically 50 to 80 km (~31 to 50 mi) between charges (150 km/~93 mi with Li-Ion), with a top speed of 80 km/h (~49.7 MPH), and features a 1.6 kW electric heater or an optional paraffin heater. The chassis is made of galvanized steel and the shell is made of GRP.
