= Tatiana Leskova =

French-born Brazilian ballerina (born 1922)

Tatiana Hélène Leskova
- Татьяна Юрьевна
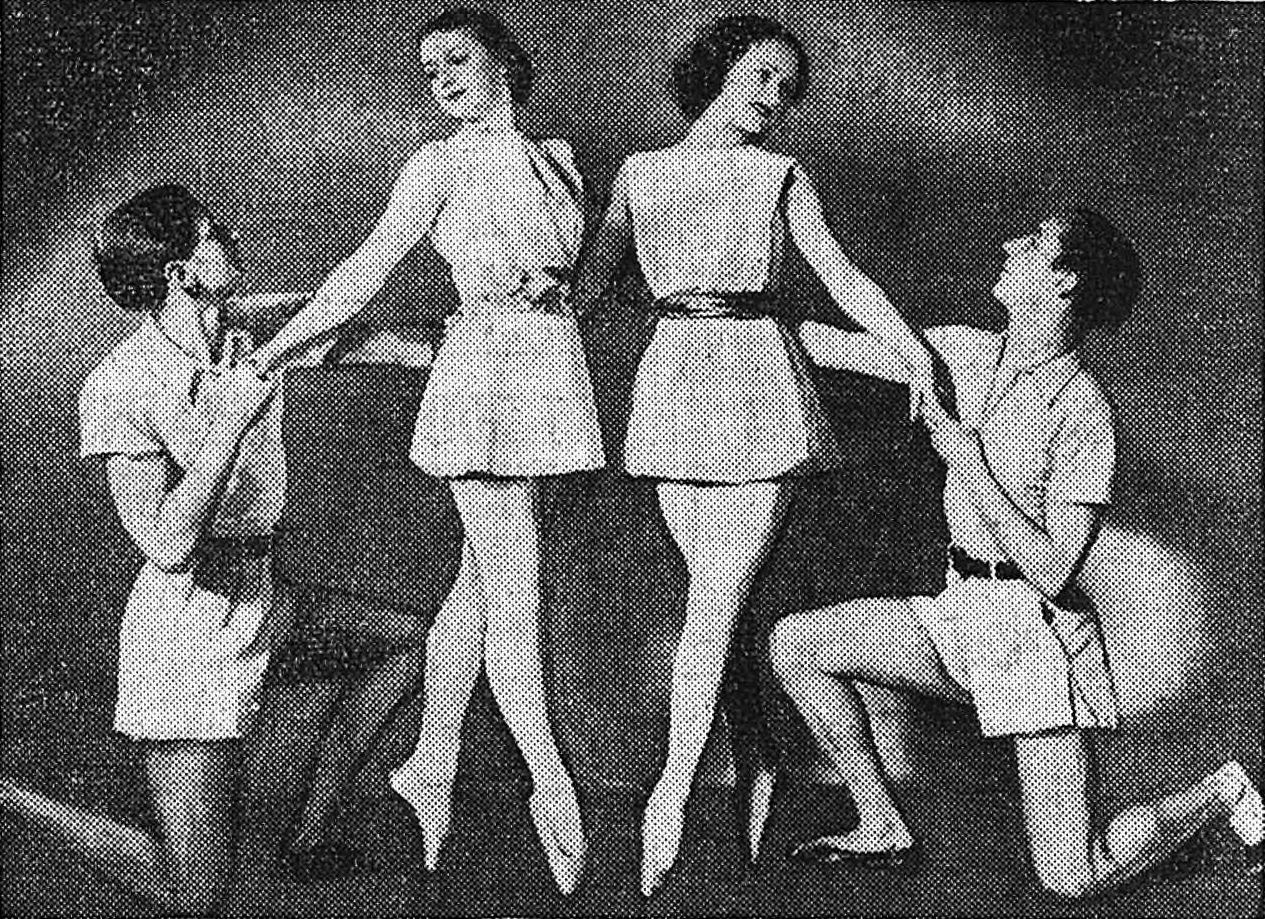
- Leskova in 1938
- Born: Tatiana Yourievna Medem Leskov; 6 December 1922 (age 103); Paris, France
- Occupation: Ballerina
- Years active: 1939–1990
- Relatives: Nikolai Leskov (great-grandfather)

Tatiana Yourievna Medem Leskov (Russian: Татьяна Юрьевна Лескова, romanized: Tatyana Yurievna Leskova; born 6 December 1922) is a French-born Brazilian ballerina and choreographer of Russian origin.

== Early life and education ==
Leskova was born in Paris, France on 6 December 1922. She was the great-granddaughter of Russian writer Nikolai Leskov. Her parents Yuri and Elena were descendant of the Russian imperial aristocracy. They fled Russia after the 1917 revolution. In 1922 the couple moved from Venice to Paris where they soon had a daughter. Her father worked as a translator and her mother got a job as a model in Elsa Schiaparelli's fashion house. Later, her parents got divorced.

Tatiana studied at Princess Paley's School for girls in Quincy-sous-Sénart. At the age of nine she lost her mother who died from tuberculosis. Her father decided that the young girl would begin to study ballet. In 1932 she was introduced to Lyubov Yegorova who did not work with young children, and advised Nicolas Kremnev. Having mastered the basics of classical dance thanks to him, Tatiana returned to Yegorova, with whom she studied until the age of fourteen. In 1937–1938, Tatiana trained with the Opéra comique ballet troupe, directed by Constantin Cherkas. In 1938, she was a member of Ygorova's brand new troupe, Les Ballets de la Jeunesse.

At the invitation of Jean-Louis Vaudoyer, she danced on the stage of the Comédie-Française in the prologue to a play by Molière. In 1939, she participated in an evening commemorating the 10th anniversary of the death of Sergei Diaghilev at the Pavillon de Marsan.

== Career ==
In 1939, Lubov Tchernicheva, ballet mistress, and Serge Grigoriev, manager of the Russian ballets of Colonel W. de Basil, hired her, with Geneviève Moulin, the Tupine brothers and Nina Popova. She performed with the Russian ballets of Colonel W. de Basil in Great Britain, in Australia, then in the United States (Los Angeles and San Francisco). In 1941, she made her debut, at the 51st Street Theater in New York City, in Balustrade under the direction of Stravinsky and George Balanchine, with whom she remained friends for the rest of her life. During the war, she also studied with Boris Knyazev, Yvette Chauviré and Zizi Jeanmaire.

In Buenos Aires, she wanted to enter the Teatro Colón so she can work with Balanchine, but cannot do so due to her minority. In 1945, in Rio de Janeiro, Tatiana and her friend Anna Volkova were offered a lucrative four-month contract with the Copacobana casino which had its own theater and choreographer. As de Basil refuses to grant them leave, they both leave the troop. In 1950, Leskova was hired as ballet mistress, choreographer and dancer of the ballet of the Municipal Theater of Rio, the oldest classical company in Brazil, and remained there until. She works on productions of ballets from the classical repertoire which are staged. Guest choreographers such as Léonide Massine, Dollar and Harald Lander are invited to work with company.

Leskova became a recognized specialist in the revival of Massine 's ballets, which her son Lorca also took up, although her work was heavily criticized by artists who worked with Massine. In particular, she performed ballets by the choreographer such as Les Présages, at the Paris Opera, at the invitation of Rudolf Nureyev, in 1989; Choreartium, in Birmingham in 1991; The Beautiful Danube, It also passes in England, where it is awarded, in the United States and in the Netherlands.

In 1985–1990, at the invitation of Olga Lepeshinskaya, she went to the Bolshoi Theater in Moscow.

== Personal life ==
In Buenos Aires, she met Luís Honold Reis, a Brazilian aristocrat, industrialist, owner of coal mines in Rio Grande do Sul. But it was in Rio, in 1944, that their relationship began, despite Leskova's young age and the fact that Luís was married to the French Giselle Zucco. Leskova performs in the Golden Room of the Copacabana Palace.

Leskova lives in Rio de Janeiro, in the Ipanema district. She turned 100 in 2022.
