= Foofwa d'Imobilité =

Swiss dancer and choreographer

Foofwa d’Imobilité
- Born: Frédéric Gafner; 24 March 1969 (age 56); Geneva, Switzerland
- Occupations: Dancer, choreographer
- Years active: 1987–present

Foofwa d'Imobilité (born 24 March 1969) is a Swiss dancer and choreographer. He lives and works in Geneva, Switzerland, and Brooklyn, New York.

== Life and career ==
Foofwa d'Imobilité was born Frédéric Gafner in Geneva, Switzerland. His mother was Beatriz Consuelo, a Brazilian ballerina/dance teacher, and his father was Claude Gafner, a Swiss dancer and photographer. Gafner studied at the Ecole de Danse de Genève and performed as a member of the Geneva Ballet Junior. From 1987–1990 he worked as a dancer and soloist with the Stuttgart Ballet. From 1991–1998 he was a dancer with the Merce Cunningham Dance Company.

Gafner changed his name in the mid-1990s to Foofwa d'Imobilité. In 1998 he began working as a choreographer, and in 2000 founded Neopost Ahrrrt, where he serves as Artistic Director.

== Honors and awards ==
- 2009 Foundation for Contemporary Arts Grants to Artists Award
- 2006 Swiss Prize of Dance and Choreography
- 1999 Grantee, Fondation Leenaards, Switzerland
- 1995 New York Dance and Performance Award for Exceptional Artistry in the work of Merce Cunningham
- 1987 Prix Professionnel at the Prix de Lausanne, Switzerland
- 1986 Bronze Medal, International Dance Competition, Jackson, Mississippi

== Works ==
Selected works include:

- 2010 Au Contraire
- 2008 The Making of Spectacles
- 2006 Incidences
- 2005 Benjamin de Bouillis
- 2003 Kilometrix.dancerun.4
- 2003 Match.dancerun.6
- 2001 Le Show
- 1999 Terpsicorp
- 1998 Iuj Godog?
