= Canta (vehicle) =

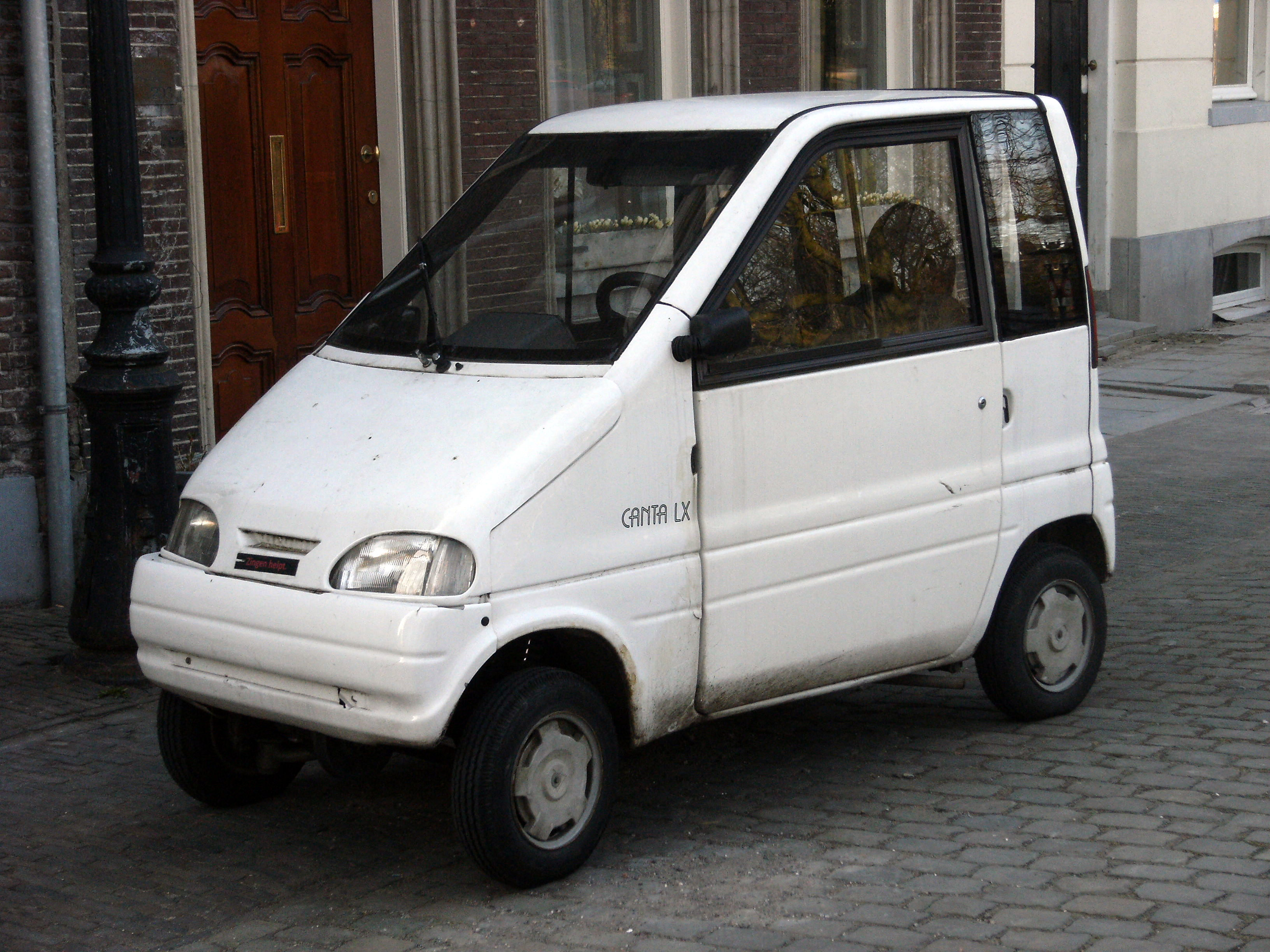
- The Canta LX

Overview
- Manufacturer: Waaijenberg

The Canta is a two-seat vehicle from the Netherlands specifically created for, but not exclusive to, disabled drivers. It was developed in 1995 by Waaijenberg together with the Delft University of Technology. In addition to the standard petrol-engined production models, an electric Canta was designed for the German market and is currently available for sale. In the Netherlands, it is classified as a mobility aid because the width of the vehicle is only 1.10 metres, thus it may – unlike larger microcars – be used on cycle paths as well as sidewalks and footpaths; in addition, a driver's license is not required.

Each Canta is built with the adaptations required by the customer, such as locating controls and switches on the left or right side, or all on the steering wheel. Seats have a wide range of adjustment and can swivel to ease entry and exit. Instead of having a driver's seat, the "Ride-in Canta" (Inrij Canta) model is designed so that a wheelchair user can enter by a ramp at the rear and drive while seated in their wheelchair. The rear of the vehicle is lowered to the ground when parked and is raised pneumatically when the engine is started.

== De Canta danst! ==
De Canta danst! is a television co-production by Viewpoint Productions and NTR in cooperation with the Dutch National Ballet that choreographically features the microcar. It is part of Het Nationale Canta ballet, which in turn is an initiative of actress-director Maartje Nevejan. It was choreographed by Ernst Meisner of the Dutch National Ballet, with the music written by composer Robin Rimbaud. The project was financially supported by Stichting Doen and the SNS REAAL Fund. The performances took place on 28 June 2012 at the Westergasfabriek.
