= Ernst Meisner =

Dutch dancer and choreographer (born 1982)

Ernst Meisner (born 27 January 1982 in Noordoostpolder) is a Dutch dancer and choreographer. He trained at the Nationale Ballet Academy in Amsterdam and at the Royal Ballet School in London.

== Career ==
He joined the English Royal Ballet company in 2000 dancing many solo roles including Benvolio in Romeo and Juliet and works by Forsythe, MacMillan, Ek, Ashton, Balanchine and Kylian, as well as creating roles for such choreographers as Wheeldon, McGregor and Tuckett. He has also expanded his repertoire by performing such works as Sans Response by ex-NDT choreographer Patrick Delcroix.

Meisner has toured extensively with the English Royal Ballet to the US, Japan, Russia, Australia and Europe and has performed with Mara Galeazzi and Friends in galas in Kenya, South Africa and Italy.

He was a finalist in the Eurovision Grand Prix for Young Dancers in Lyon, 1999. He was awarded a prize for most promising newcomer by the Alexandra Radius Fonds in the Netherlands. He produced his own show with dancers from the English Royal Ballet and the Mariinsky (Kirov) Ballet in 2005.

He has also choreographed several pieces for the Royal Ballet Workshop. His dances were also performed in New Works in the Linbury 2008 and galas in England and Italy. His duet called "What if..." was made for up and coming Royal Ballet dancers Melissa Hamilton and Sergei Polunin.

He closely works together with composer Paul Gladstone-Reid and designer Karoline Weber on many projects. He organizes children workshops and also teaches ballet. He was invited to attend Dance East's Rural Retreat for Future Dance Directors in January 2008. His agent is the former dancer Gavin Roebuck

In 2010, Meisner joined the Dutch National Ballet as grand sujet. Increasingly, he is working as a choreographer. One of his choreographies is De Kleine Grote Kist, developed for children aged under four (and their parents). In 2012, he choreographed Het Nationale Canta Ballet, a ballet for 50 ballet dancers and 55 small cars for the disabled. Piece de resistance of that ballet was a double pas de deux: first, Dutch National Ballet soloists Marisa Lopez and Casey Herd performed a pas de deux; after Lopez left the stage, Herd partnered with a red Canta, driven by Dutch writer Karin Spaink. Recently Meisner has choreographed and after we were and Saltarello for Dutch National Ballet.

In September 2018, Meisner was appointed interim artistic director for the National Ballet Academy of Amsterdam.
