= Waaijenberg =

- Industry: Automotive
- Founded: 1966
- Founder: Kees Waaijenberg
- Headquarters: Veenendaal, Netherlands
- Products: Micro cars
- Website: www.waaijenberg.com

Waaijenberg (Dutch: [ˈʋaːjəmˌbɛrx]) is a Dutch carmaker of micro cars, especially low-speed neighborhood-vehicles for wheelchair users and handicapped drivers. Founded in 1966 by Kees Waaijenberg, the firm is headquartered in Veenendaal, Netherlands.

In the 1970s and 1980s, it was popular for importing the Dutch version of Reliant Robin by the British carmaker Reliant. In 1978, the company started making vehicles for the disabled. From 1980 to 1996, they produced a vehicle called the Arola, which was rebadged from an Arola from a French carmaker. In 1995, they released a car called Canta, aimed at the disabled public.

Waaijenberg's microcars have a limited speed of 45 km/h, and are therefore not allowed to be driven on expressways and motorways. By the Dutch law, many of their microcars' drivers do not need a license.

== Products since 1995 ==
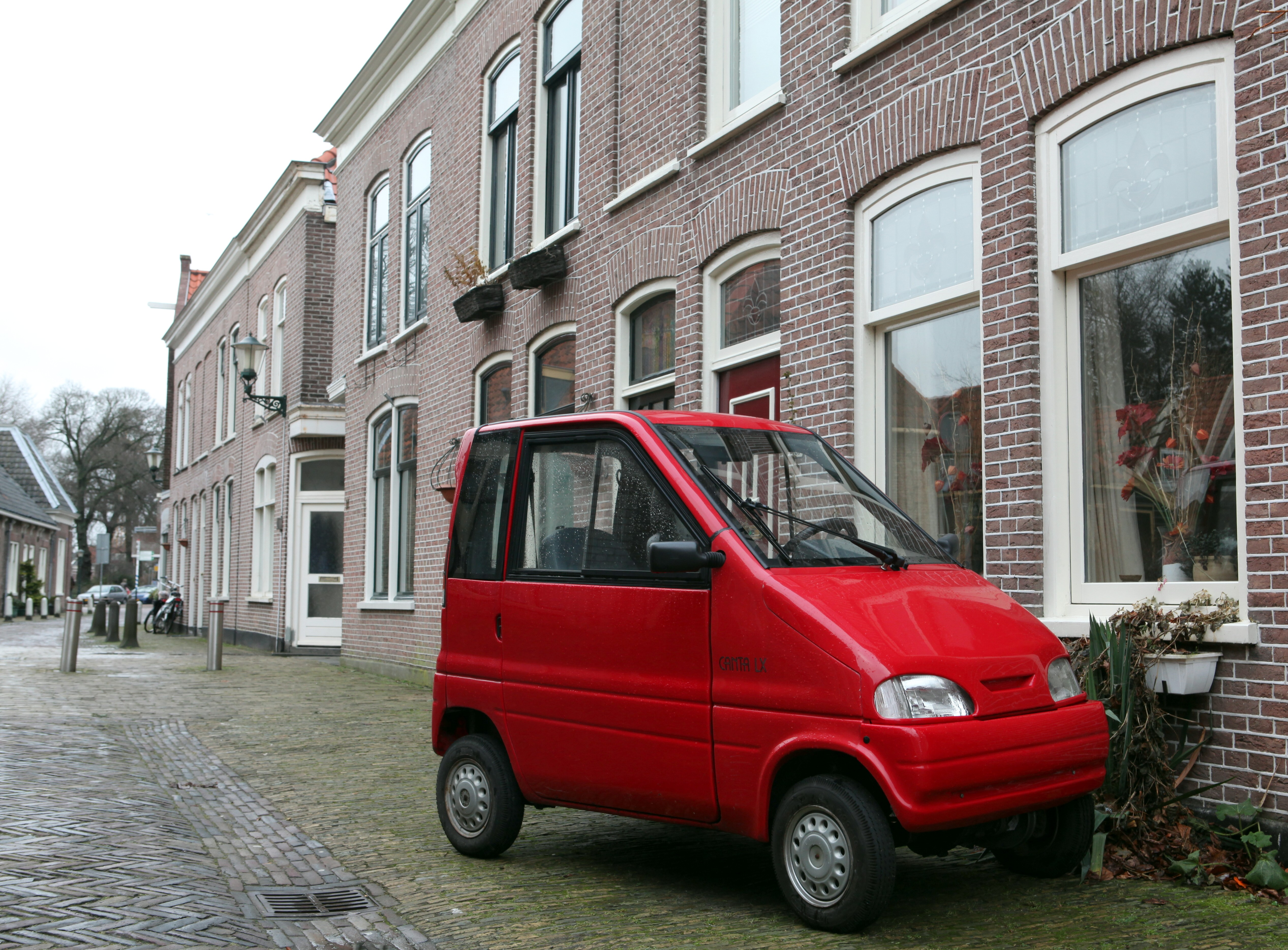
Waaijenberg Canta

- Canta
- Inrij Canta

Imports

- JDM
- Microcar
- Dué
- Chatenet
- Ligier
- Aixam, Mega
