= Buddy (electric car) =

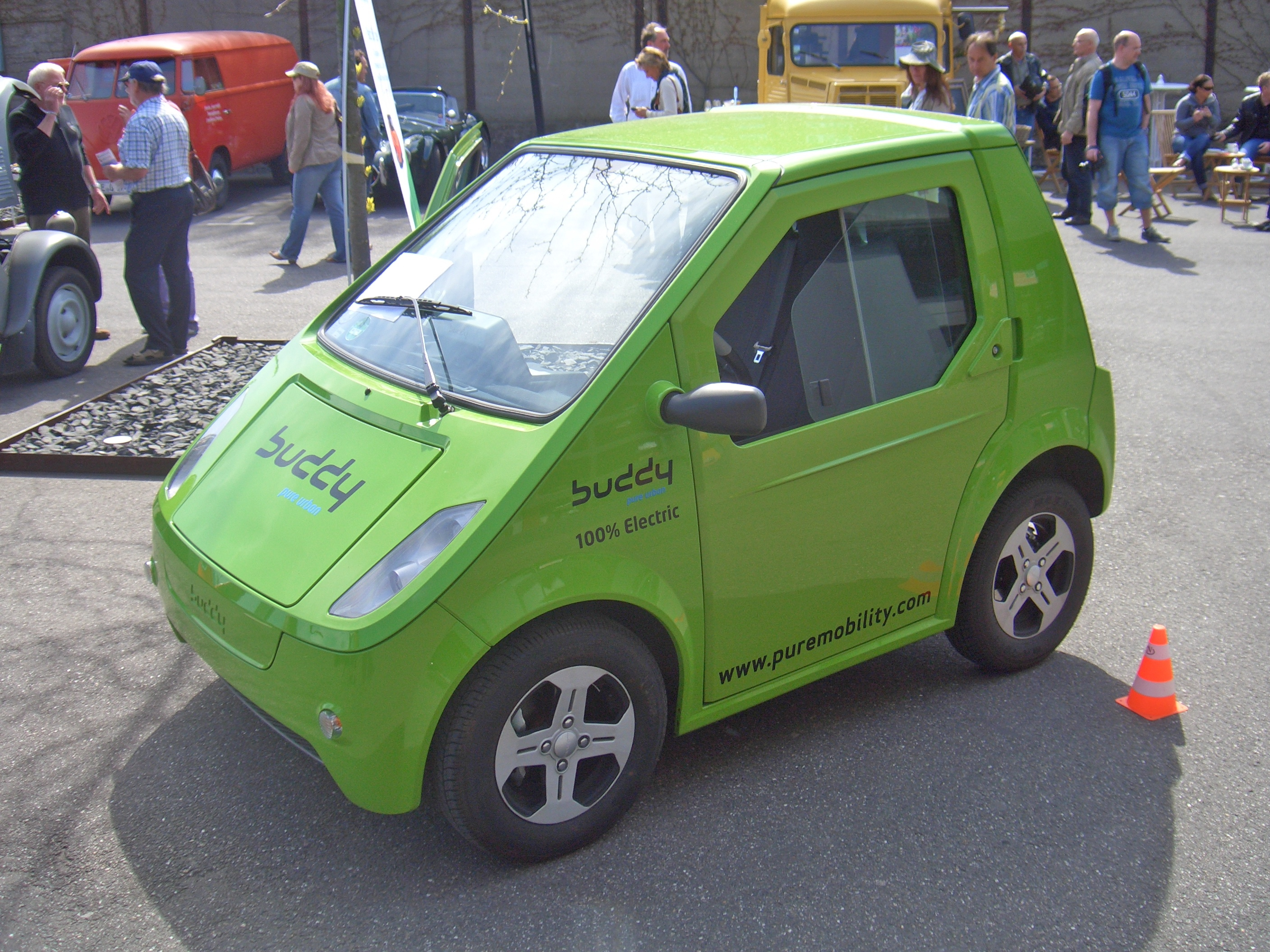

Overview
- Manufacturer: Buddy Electric (formerly known as Pure Mobility)
- Production: 2005–2013
- Model years: 2006–2013

Body and chassis
- Class: heavy quadricycle
- Body style: 2-door, 3-seater

Powertrain
- Electric motor: 72V Sepex 13 kW brushed DC motor

Dimensions
- Wheelbase: 1550 mm (61.0 in)
- Length: 2440 mm (96 in)
- Width: 1430 mm (56.3 in)
- Height: 1440 mm (56.7 in)

Chronology
- Predecessor: Kewet

Buddy is a Norwegian electric city car, produced by Buddy Electric in the early 2000s, formerly known as Pure Mobility and Elbil Norge AS, at Økern in Oslo. In 2007, the Buddy, and its predecessor, the Kewet, made up 20% of the electric cars in Norway. Since its inception in 1991, combined sales of the Kewet and Buddy had totaled about 1,500 vehicles through October 2013, of which 1,087 were registered in Norway.

== History ==
Buddy is the sixth generation of the Kewet electric vehicle. Originally, the Kewet was developed in Hadsund, Denmark, and the first model was made in 1991. Production alternated between Hadsund, Denmark, and Nordhausen, Germany. During the first five generations, over 1,000 electric vehicles were produced. They were sold in 18 countries. In 1998, all rights were acquired by ElBil Norge AS (which, at the time, was called Kollega Bil AS). For some years, ElBil Norge further developed the vehicle and in the autumn of 2005, a new model was presented that was first called Kewet Buddy Citi-Jet 6, but is now known simply as the Buddy.

In December 2008, the first 12 Buddy cars were sent from the Buddy factory in Økern by boat to Copenhagen. In 2010, Pure Mobility (former "Elbil Norge") launched a new version of the Buddy, initially marketed as "MetroBuddy", but the "Metro" prefix was removed due to negative or confusing associations with the term.

== Technology and production ==
Buddy is a simple, functional, electric city car with a range of 20 to 60 km (12 to 37 mi) depending on the season, topography and driving style. Its maximum speed is 80 km/h (50 mph). Its length is 244 cm (96 in).

The Buddy consists of a strong, hot galvanized steel tube frame with safety cage, but with no proper deformation zones. The body was originally made of thin fiberglass but in the later version an innovative polymer pDCPD was used, providing lower costs, lighter weight and impact resistance. Other metal parts are treated so that further rust treatment is unnecessary. The electric motor is a 72V Sepex 13 kW, a direct current motor with brushes. Well-tried technological solutions have been used for maximal reliability. The car has no servo or aids regarding steering and braking, and the response and "connection" to brakes and front wheels are vague and difficult to finesse. It also lacks safety equipment such as ABS, ESP or airbags.

The Buddy was produced with lead acid batteries which, when completely discharged, can be recharged in 6–8 hours, or rapidly charged so that one hour's charging allows the vehicle to be driven about 10 km (6.2 mi). Charging uses an ordinary grounded outlet with a minimum circuit of 10 A. The batteries' life expectancy is 2–5 years, or about 20,000 km, depending on driving and charging habits. A complete battery set costs from £2,800, excluding value added tax.

ElBil Norge has made a development fleet of Buddy vehicles equipped with various forms of Li-ion battery technology. When the technology becomes available commercially, existing vehicles will potentially be upgradeable.

The Buddy is classified in the EU as a heavy quadricycle (an electric four-wheel motorcycle). These can be used as an ordinary vehicle without restrictions, and drivers require only an ordinary driver's license.

Two models of the Buddy were available: the standard version, and the BuddyCab with a folding roof. In 2007, production at Økern in Oslo was 5–6 vehicles a week, with a theoretical capacity of 500 vehicles annually. As of late 2008, plans were underway for an additional factory in Portugal, with projected production of 5,000 cars per year.

ElBil Norge AS later rebranded as Pure Mobility AS and the company declared bankruptcy in 2011; the company was liquidated in 2014. Production of the Buddy EV ceased after the model year 2013.

== Sales ==
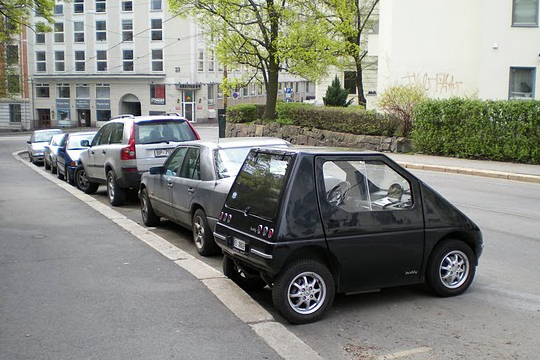
Parking the Buddy in perpendicular position to the sidewalk is legal in Norway at spaces reserved for motorcycles.

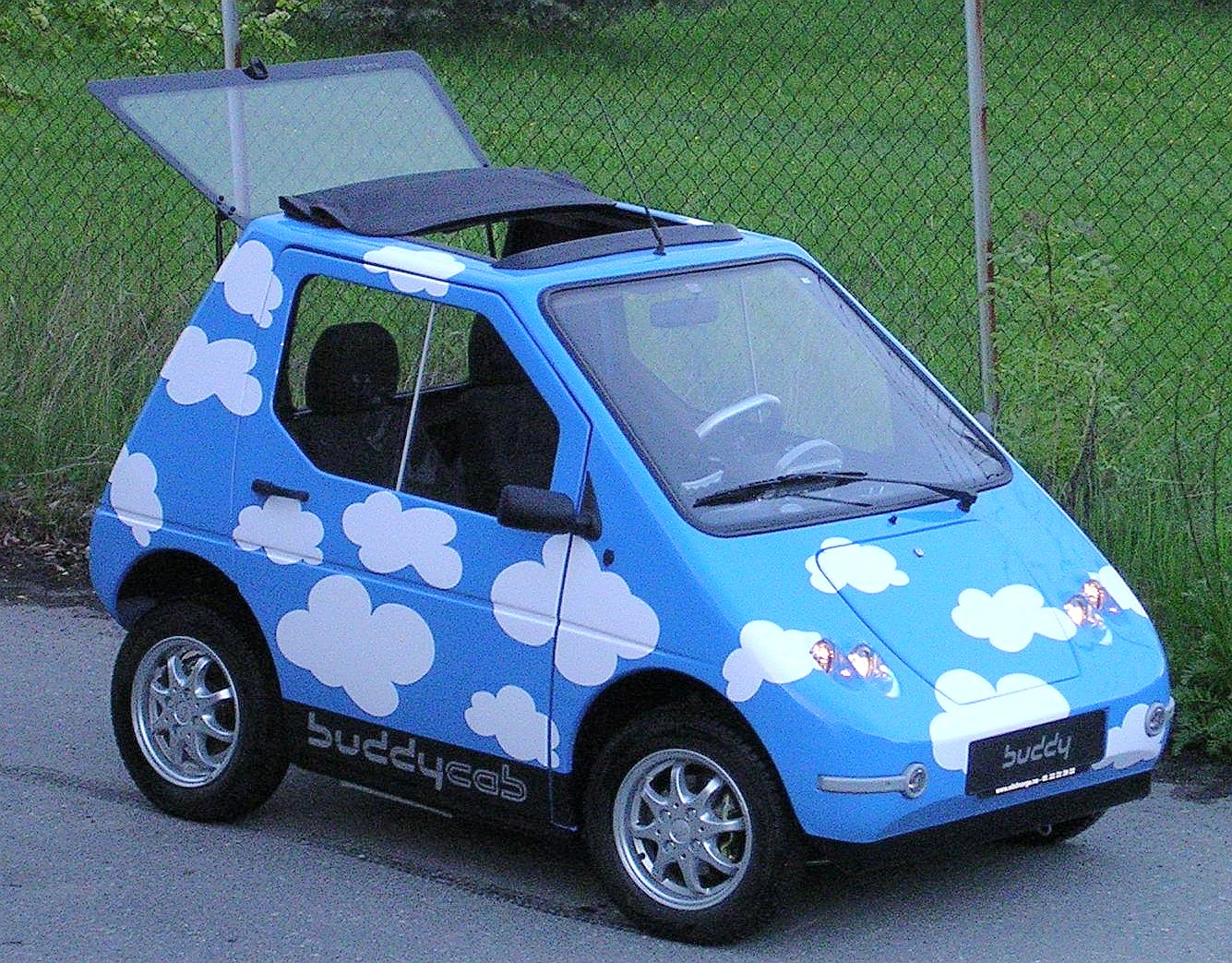
Buddy graphics inspired by the customer's bedside table lamp

The Buddy ranked 29th in sales by automotive brands in Norway in 2006, ahead of Jaguar, Fiat, Smart and Porsche. While most other cars there are dark or muted colors, about 80% of Buddys are delivered in a multitude of strong, bright colours, with many using bold decorative elements such as flowers, hearts, clouds, and flames. One cloud-covered Buddy was designed to match the owner's night table lamp.

125 Buddies were sold in Norway in 2011, a market share of 6% of all electric vehicles sold in the country that year. As of September 2013, 1,087 units were registered in Norway, the leading market, consisting of 2 Kewet CITI VANs, 22 Kewet EL-JET (1–4)s, 50 Kewet CITI JET 5s, 379 Buddy M9 (2010–2013), and 634 Kewet Buddy Citi-Jet 6 (2005–2009).

== Operations and ownership ==
Buddy was produced by Buddy Electric (formerly known as "Pure Mobility" and "ElBil Norge AS") which in 2003 changed its name from Kollega Bil AS. Originally established in 1992, it has been in the electric vehicle business since that time. Its managing director is Kjell Strøm. Elbil Norge AS is owned by its original founders Jan-Petter Skram and Viggo Vargum, and external investors include Hafslund Venture AS, Gezina AS (Th. Brøvig), members of the Selvaag family, Lychegaarden (Jens P. Heyerdahl) and Jan Chr G Sundt. The owners have gradually expanded the company. In 2005, the owners invested NOK 12 million to expand the Økern factory. ElBil Norge was profitable in 2004 and 2005 and has a ratio of owner equity to debt of 90%.

== Technical specifications ==
- Mass without batteries: 400 kg (880 lb)
- Lead batteries weight: 395 kg (871 lb)
- Maximum allowed weight: 1,020 kg (2,250 lb)
- Seating capacity: 3 adults
- Length x Width x Height: 2440 x 1430 x 1440 mm
- Wheelbase: 155 cm
- Turning circle: 7.0 m
- Motor: SepEx 72V DC
- Power: 13 kW
- Top speed: 80 to 90 km/h (50 to 56 mph)
- Acceleration: 0–50 km/h in 7 s
- Maximum hill-starting ability: 20%
- Suspension: Front – MacPherson struts. Rear – Independent telescopic suspension
- Wheels/Tyres standard: Alloy wheels 4Jx13 // 135(145)/80R13
- Brakes: Regenerative braking to enhance the driving range.
- Disc brakes on all wheels with double circuit braking system. Parking brake on the rear wheels
- Body: Fibreglass reinforced polyester
- Safety cabin: Welded tubular steel space frame, optional hot dip galvanised
- Batteries:
  - Maintenance-free lead acid batteries, ca 10,5 kWh available.
  - Under testing systems with lithium-ion battery technology, 10 or 14 kWh
- Charging time: 0–100% in 6–8 hours, 30–95% in 3 hours
- Range:
  - Lead-acid batteries 50 to 100 km (31 to 62 mi), depending on road conditions, temperature and the driver
  - Lithium-ion batteries up to 150 km (93 mi)
- Homologation number (Reference Approval Number): e11*2002/24*0153*03 (2002/24/EG: Type Approval for 2- and 3-wheeled motorised vehicles)

== In popular culture ==
The Buddy appeared in the Hollywood film Downsizing (2017) starring Matt Damon. It is also driven by the main character in the Norwegian drama film 1001 Grams (2014).

== See also ==
- Electric car use by country
- Plug-in electric vehicles in Norway
- Government incentives for plug-in electric vehicles
- List of modern production plug-in electric vehicles
- Plug-in electric vehicle
- Uniti (automobile)
