= Eurovision Young Dancers 1989 =

Dance competition; third edition of Eurovision Young Dancers

Date and venue
- Final: 28 June 1989
- Venue: Palais des Congrès; Paris, France

Organisation
- Organiser: European Broadcasting Union (EBU)
- Executive supervisor: Frank Naef

Production
- Host broadcaster: France Régions 3 (FR3)
- Director: Dirk Sanders
- Executive producer: Josette Affergan
- Presenters: Zizi Jeanmaire; Alain Duault

Participants
- Number of entries: 17
- Number of finalists: 10
- Debuting countries: Cyprus; Portugal
- Participation map: frameless}} Participating countries Did not qualify from the semi-final

Vote
- Voting system: A professional jury awarded two main prizes and two special prices for classical dance and contemporary dance
- Winning dancers: France Agnès Letestu (contemporary dance); United Kingdom Tetsuya Kumakawa (classical ballet)

Eurovision Young Dancers 1989 was the 3rd edition of Eurovision Young Dancers, held on 28 June 1989 at the Palais des Congrès in Paris, France, and presented by Zizi Jeanmaire and Alain Duault. It was organised by the European Broadcasting Union (EBU) and host broadcaster France Régions 3 (FR3).

Dancers representing seventeen countries took part in the competition, with ten of them participating in the televised final. Cyprus and Portugal made their debut at the contest.

The participating broadcaster could send one or two dancers, male or female, that could not be older than 19. Each dancer was free to participate in any of these two categories: classical dancing or contemporary, modern or jazz dancing. The pas de deux performances could not be longer than ten minutes, while the variations could not be longer than five minutes. There were four awards that year: contemporary dancing prize, classical dancing prize and two jury's special prizes (also for contemporary and classical dance).

Agnès Letestu representing France won the contemporary dance prize, with Tetsuya Kumakawa representing the United Kingdom winning the classical ballet prize.

== Location ==
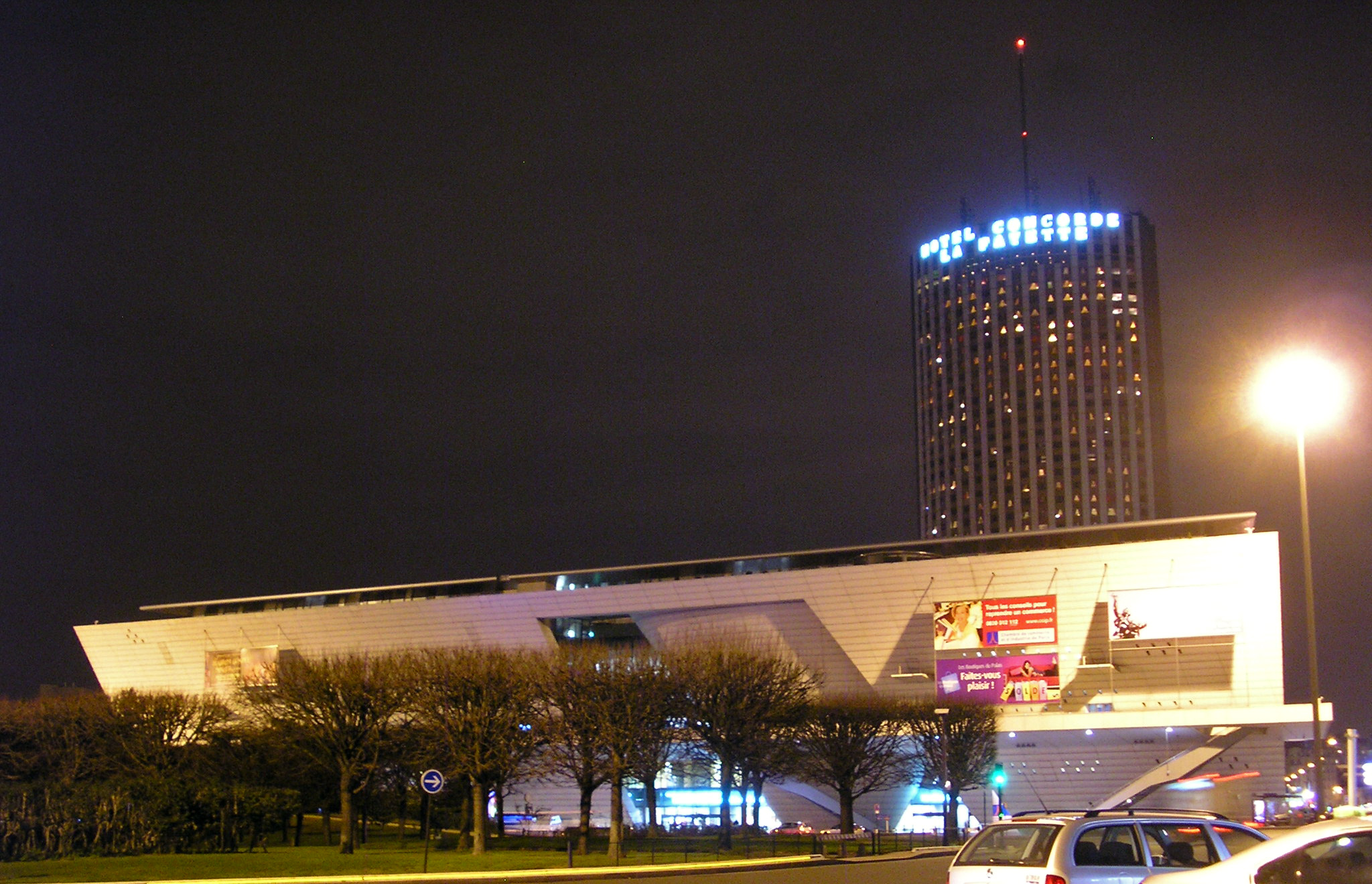
Palais des Congrès in Paris (2007)

The Palais des congrès de Paris, a concert venue, convention centre and shopping mall in the 17th arrondissement of Paris, France, was the host venue for the 1989 edition of Eurovision Young Dancers.

The venue was built by French architect Guillaume Gillet, and was inaugurated in 1974. The venue hosted the Eurovision Song Contest 1978. Nearby the venue are Bois de Boulogne and the affluent neighbourhood of Neuilly-sur-Seine. The closest métro and RER stations are Porte Maillot and Neuilly – Porte Maillot, accessible via the lower levels of the building.

== Format ==
The format consists of dancers who are non-professional and between the ages of 16–21, competing in a performance of dance routines of their choice, which they have prepared in advance of the competition. All the dancers then take part in a choreographed group dance during 'Young Dancers Week'.

Jury members of a professional aspect and representing the elements of ballet, contemporary, and modern dancing styles, score each of the competing individual and group dance routines. The overall winner upon completion of the final dances is chosen by the professional jury members.

The opening act was "Mon truc en plumes" performed by host Zizi Jeanmaire with her dancers and for the interval "Concerto en Ré" by L'École du Ballet de l'Ópera de Paris.

== Participants and results ==
Due to time restrictions, a semi-final was held to select the ten performers for the final.

=== Preliminary round ===
Broadcasters from sixteen countries took part in the preliminary semi-final round of the 1989 contest, of which ten qualified to the televised grand final. The following participants failed to qualify.

Country	Broadcaster	Dancer(s)
Italy	RAI	Danilo Mazzota
Cyprus	CyBC	Hélène O'Keefe
Canada	CBC/Radio-Canada	Cherice Barton
Yugoslavia	JRT	Dino Baksa
Portugal	RTP	Ana Lacerda
Norway	NRK	Hilde Olsen
Austria	ORF	Jürgen Wagner

=== Final ===
Participants and results
Country	Broadcaster	Dancer(s)	Dance(s)	Prize
France	FR3	Agnès Letestu	Grand pas classique Notre Dame de Paris	Contemporary Dance Prize
United Kingdom	BBC	Tetsuya Kumakawa	Don Quixote: Kolya's variation	Classical Ballet Prize
Switzerland	SRG SSR	Christina McDermott	Le Corsaire Esmeralda	Jury's special prize (Classical)
Spain	TVE	María Giménez and Igor Yebra	Arraigo	Jury's special prize (Contemporary)
Belgium	RTBF	Géraldine Boussart	La Crevèche	
Denmark	DR	Rachel Hester and Martin Vedel	Pavane	
Finland	YLE	Petri Toivanen	Don Quichotte Norbotten	
Netherlands	NOS	Gaby Baars and Léon Pronk	Bruicheath	
Sweden	SVT	Marie Lindqvist	3rd act of Sleeping Beauty Paquita	
Germany	ZDF	Patrick Becker	Vaslaw Daphnis et Chloé	

== Jury members ==
The jury members consisted of the following:

- France – Roland Petit (Head of jury)
- Denmark – Frank Andersen
- Italy – Paolo Bortoluzzi
- Argentina – Oscar Araiz
- France – Igor Eisner
- Germany – John Neumeier
- USSR – Ekaterina Maximova
- Switzerland – Heinz Spoerli
- USSR – Vladimir Vasiliev

== Broadcasts ==
The 1989 Young Dancers competition was broadcast in 19 countries including Jordan and Bulgaria. Known details on the broadcasts in each country, including the specific broadcasting stations and commentators are shown in the tables below.

Broadcasters in participating countries
Country	Broadcaster	Channel(s)	Commentator(s)	Ref(s)
Austria	ORF	FS2 (Note: Deferred broadcast at 23:00 (CET))	Karl Musil	
Belgium	RTBF	Télé 21		
Canada	TV5	TV5 Québec Canada (Note: Deferred broadcast on 4 August at 10:00 (EDT))		
Cyprus	CyBC	RIK		
Denmark	DR	DR TV	Niels Oxenvad	
France	FR3			
France	TV5	TV5 Europe		
Germany	3sat		Jens Wendland	
Germany	ZDF (Note: Delayed broadcast in a shortened format on 9 July at 23:00 (CET))			
Italy	RAI	Rai Tre (Note: Deferred broadcast at 23:00 (CET))		
Netherlands	NOS	Nederland 3	Joop van Zijl and Jan Linkens	
Norway	NRK	NRK Fjernsynet	Eyvind Solås	
Spain	TVE	TVE 2		
Sweden	SVT	Kanal 1 (Note: Deferred broadcast at 21:40 CET (20:40 UTC))		
Switzerland	SRG SSR	SRG Sportkette	Verena Hoehne	
Switzerland	SRG SSR	SSR Chaîne Sportive	Jean-Pierre Pastori	
Switzerland	SRG SSR	TSI Canale Sportivo		
United Kingdom	BBC	BBC2	Judith Mackrell and Richard Alston	
Yugoslavia	JRT	TV Beograd 2		
Yugoslavia	JRT	TV Zagreb 2		

Broadcasters and commentators in non-participating countries
Country	Broadcaster	Channel(s)	Commentator(s)	Ref.
Bulgaria	BT	BT 1 (Note: Delayed broadcast on 20 December at 22:10 (EEST))		

== See also ==
- Eurovision Song Contest 1989
