= Christine Maier =

Swiss television journalist and presenter

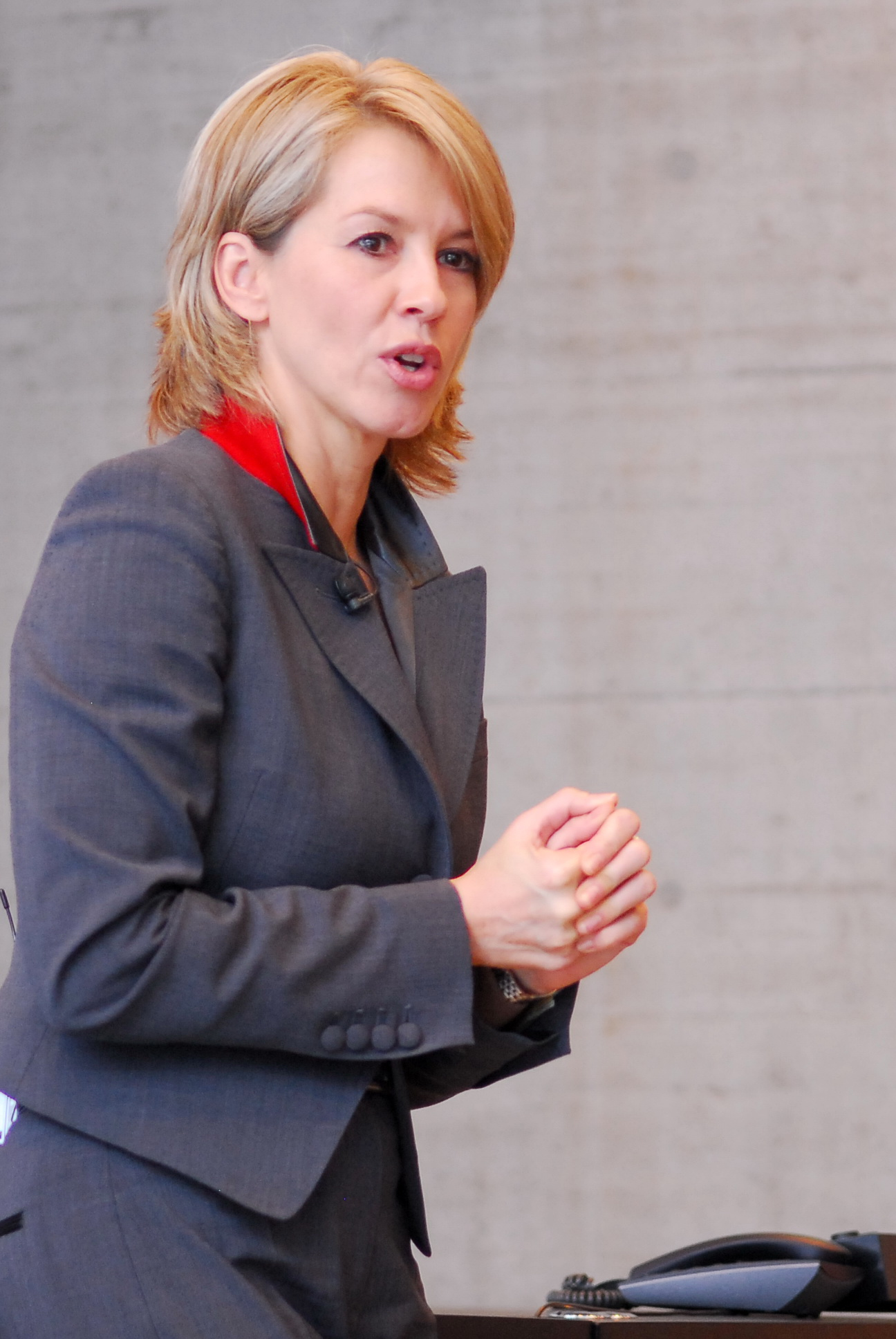
- Born: 23 May 1965 (age 60)
- Occupation: Television presenter
- Years active: 1987-present
- Spouse: David Dimitri
- Children: 2

Christine Maier (born 23 May 1965) is a Swiss television journalist and presenter.

== Biography ==
Maier completed her degree in journalism after studying for five semesters. In 1987 she began working at Schweizer Fernsehen, initially as an announcer and from 1989 as moderator. From 1991 to 1998 she worked as an editor and moderator of various programmes of ZDF and Bayerischer Rundfunk.

In 2001 she returned to SRF 1 as an announcer of the talkshow Zischtigsclub . In 2005, she filled in for Daniela Lager during her half-year maternity leave on the current affairs show 10vor10. After the departure of longtime Club host Ueli Heiniger in 2006, she took over its editorial management, and in November 2011 she presented her last show for the Club. In early August 2011, she took over at "10vor10" as the successor of Susanne Wille. On 4 October 2013 she presented the news for the last time at Schweizer Radio und Fernsehen. Since 1 November 2013 she has been the editor-in-chief of SonntagsBlick.

Maier hosted the Swiss Economic Forum (SEF) for ten years. At the beginning of March 2016, Ringier announced that Christine Maier would be in charge of the "Sunday Blues" beginning in two months, taking on various tasks in its film production; coaching and designing a discussion platform for Ringier, which will be part of a new talk show.

== Personal life ==
In 2003, Maier briefly fell ill with melanoma. She was married until 2015 with the artist David Dimitri, with whom she has an adult daughter and an adult son.
