= Hohn =

Hohn may refer to:

== People ==
- Annette Hohn (born 1966), German rower
- Barbara Hohn (born 1939), Austrian molecular biologist
- Bärbel Höhn (born 1952), German politician for Alliance '90/The Greens
- Bill Hohn (born 1955), baseball umpire
- Bob Hohn (born 1941), American football player
- Carola Höhn (1910–2005), German stage and movie actress
- Chris Hohn (born 1966), English hedge fund manager and philanthropist
- Donovan Hohn (born 1972), American author, essayist, and editor
- Fritz Höhn (1896–1918), German World War I fighter ace
- Hermann Hohn (1897–1968), German World War II general
- Immanuel Höhn (born 1991), German football player
- Joy Hohn, American politician
- Kathryn Elizabeth Hohn (1920–2016), birth name of American actress Kathryn Adams Doty
- Mark Hohn (born 1964), Australian rugby player
- Matthias Höhn (born 1975), German politician
- Uwe Hohn (born 1962), German athlete and coach
- Sandi A. Hohn (born 1952), Japanese singer and vocalist
- Höhn., taxonomic author abbreviation of Franz Xaver Rudolf von Höhnel (1852–1920), Austrian bryologist, mycologist, and algologist

== Other uses ==
- Hohn, Schleswig-Holstein, a German municipality
- Höhn, a municipality in Rhineland-Palatinate, Germany
- Hohn House, building in Ljubljana, Slovenia
- Hohn Air Base, military air base in Germany

== See also ==
- Hohne (disambiguation)
- Höhne (disambiguation)
