= Patrizia Laeri =

Swiss economic journalist

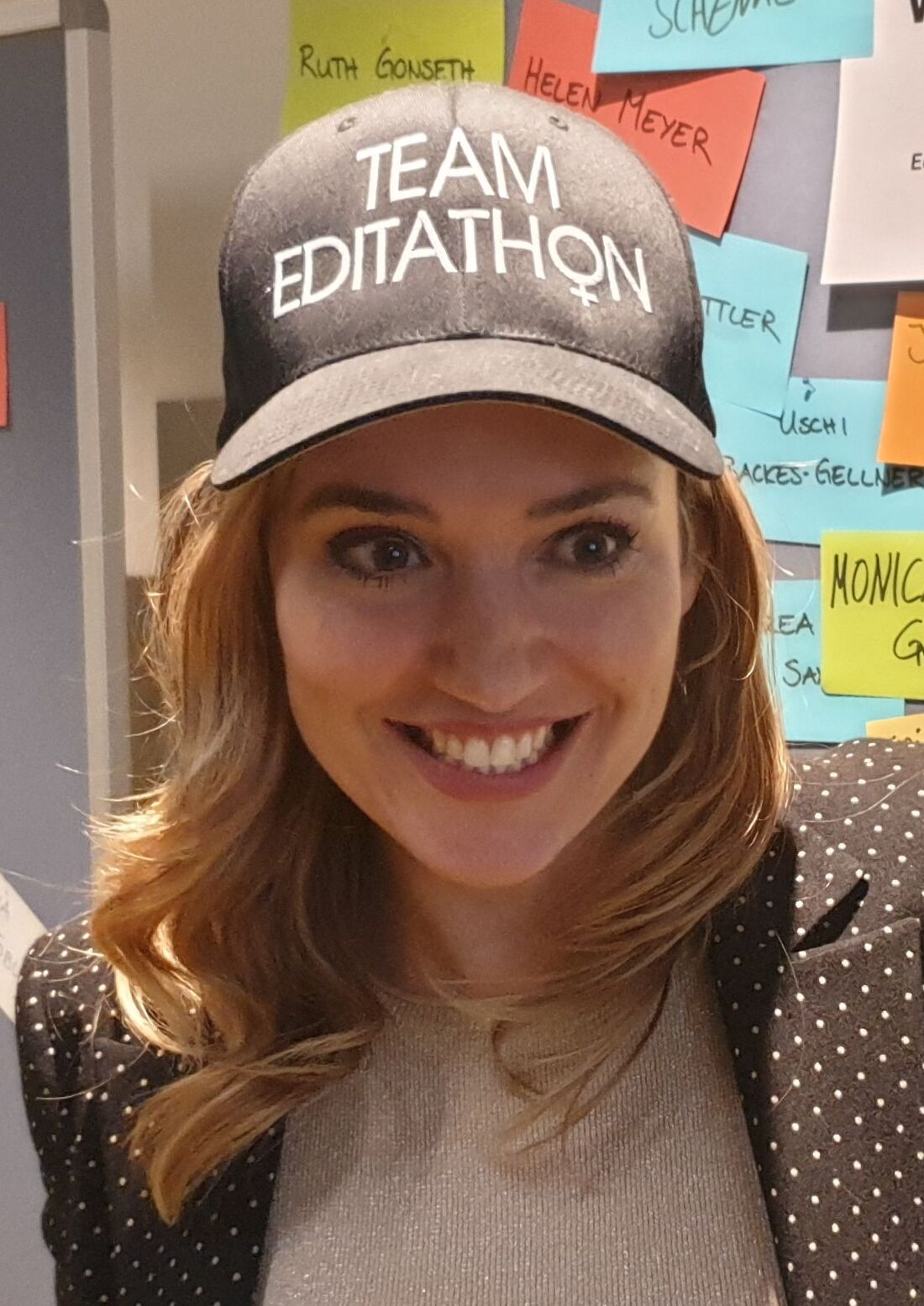
- Born: 9 May 1977
- Occupations: Journalist, television presenter

Patrizia Laeri (born 9 May 1977) is a Swiss business journalist and program host.

From 2003 until June 2020 Laeri worked at Schweizer Radio und Fernsehen (SRF) as TV-Host. Later, she was editor-in-chief for CNNMoney in Switzerland.

== Life ==
Laeri grew up in Flurlingen. She studied Business Administration at the University of Zurich and University of Madrid. She graduated in business administration.

After completing her studies, Laeri completed a traineeship at the Neue Zürcher Zeitung.

== Career ==
She has been working for Swiss television since 2003. From 2005 to 2012, she worked as an economic editor for the programs 10vor10 and Tagesschau . Since 2007, she hosted the business program SRF Börse.

She has hosted at the World Economic Forum in Davos since 2011. In 2018, she moderated the Sechseläuten, for the SRF. In the Blick newspaper she has been writing a bi-weekly column under the label #aufbruch since 2018 .

== Family ==
She has two sons and lives with her partner in Männedorf. She campaigns for more flexible day structures, "parental leave", temporary women's quotas and more women in top positions in the economy.
