= Stephan Klapproth =

Swiss journalist, television presenter and professor

- Born: 8 August 1958; Luzern, Switzerland
- Education: Université de Genève
- Occupations: Swiss journalist, television presenter, columnist and professor
- Years active: 1986–present
- Known for: 10vor10
- Awards: 2005 Swiss TV Award as most popular television presenter.

Stephan Klapproth (born 1958) is a Swiss journalist, television presenter, and professor, who was from 1993 to 2015, the popular anchorman of the Swiss national evening news shows 10vor10. He also teaches journalism at the Universities of Fribourg, Neuchâtel and Zürich.

== Early life and education ==
Klapproth was born in Luzern, Canton of Luzern. His mother is a journalist and his father a German language teacher. Born and raised in Luzern, he has two sisters and two brothers. He studied political science, economics, and contemporary history, with complementary studies in jurisprudence, and graduated in political science at the Université de Genève in 1981. He worked as research and teaching assistant at his alma mater on the research area decision-making processes in the Swiss domestic politics in 1982/83.

== Radio and television ==
One year later, he started working as reporter and editor for the Radio Genève Information, and for the Swiss Radio International in Bern where he moderated the popular information magazine Echo der Zeit from 1986 to 1992, in the beginning as correspondent, among others during the revolutions in Slovakia and Romania in 1989, later as chief editor of Echo der Zeit. Starting in 1993 Stephan Klapproth became the anchorman of the evening news show 10vor10 of the Swiss national television Schweizer Fernsehen SRF. On occasion of special broadcasts he travelled many countries, among others Klapproth hosted the live special broadcast of 10vor10 on occasion of the 9-11 terror attacks, and the US presidential elections in 1992 and 2012. While moderating 10vor10, in 2002 he participated also some episodes of Sternstunde Philosophie and Reporter for Schweizer Fernsehen SRF. From 2002 to 2004 Klapproth was also host of the entertainment show QUIZ today, a quiz on current political events, but the audience rating statistics were low, therefore the show was cancelled by the Swiss television channel SRF 1. In 2005 Klapproth was awarded with the Swiss TV Award as the most popular television presenter. The prize money of CHF 20,000, he stated to donate to the charity Goutte d'eau which is fighting against child trafficking and prostitution in Asia, those exemplary orphanages have impressed me on a visit to Cambodia. For 21 years Stephan Klapproth commonly was called Mr. 10vor10, and he left the daily crew on 4 September 2015, moderating in all about 2000 shows. He still moderates 10vor10 specials, and the cultural program Sternstunde Philosophie since January 2015.

== Mr. 10vor10 ==
10vor10, a current affairs show on German-speaking Swiss public television channel SRF 1, started on 20 August 1990, and Stefan Klapproth joined the moderation team in 1993. His decision to leave the 10vor10 team, Klapproth explained to the SRF officials: I was for the radio in revolutionary Bucharest, flew for television in an experimental aircraft through Africa, hosted by the first five hours as the world on 11 September 2001 did not know what happened [sic]...I would have never dreamed when I was immersed at the university with passion in the political philosophy...

== Journalism and teachings ==
Klapproth teaches television and radio journalism at the Universities of Fribourg, Neuchâtel and Zürich. He is also active as a lecturer and conducts economic symposiums and political discussions. Since high school and during his studies, Stephan Klapproth also writes as a freelance journalist for various newspapers.

== Personal life ==
Stephan Klapproth silently married in 2008. He loves canoeing and is an accomplished private pilot, but lacking time to fly.

== Awards ==
- 2005 Swiss TV Award as most popular television presenter.
