= Silberschmidt =

Silberschmidt is a surname. Notable people with the surname include:

- Andri Silberschmidt (born 1994), Swiss businessman
- Bigna Silberschmidt (born 1985), Swiss journalist and news presenter
