= Schweiz – Suisse – Svizzera – Svizra 4 =

Former Swiss television channel (1995–1997)

- Country: Switzerland

Programming
- Languages: French, German, Italian, Romansh
- Picture format: SDTV 576i

Ownership
- Owner: SRG SSR

History
- Launched: 1 March 1995; 31 years ago
- Replaced: S Plus (1993–1995)
- Closed: 1 September 1997; 28 years ago
- Replaced by: SF2, TSR 2 and TSI 2

Schweiz 4 (in German; French: Suisse 4; Italian: Svizzera 4; Romansh: Svizra 4; transl. "Switzerland 4") was a Swiss terrestrial television channel owned by SRG SSR, the federal broadcasting corporation. The channel evolved from the former S Plus, a channel that existed since 1993 and whose frequencies dated back to the Sports Network (Sportkette) created in 1982 following the vertiginous rise of sports broadcasts on Swiss television.

== Background and history ==
Sports Network (Sportkette) began broadcasting for the 1982 FIFA World Cup in Spain. At that time, SRG SSR operated three terrestrial television channels available throughout Switzerland, one in each official language: SF DRS in German, TSR in French, and TSI in Italian. During a broadcast on the virtual fourth channel (in German: SRG Sportkette; French: SSR Chaîne Sportive, Italian: SSR Canale Sportivo), one of the two other language channels could no longer be received.

Sportkette Plus or Sport Plus, marketed as SPlus, was a sports overflow channel with Roy Oppenheim at the helm. The slogan of the service was "One Program on Two Channels" (Ein Programm auf zwei Kanälen). The channel received a licence from the Federal Council on 18 November 1992, in order to broadcast and started its services on 25 September 1993, for the whole of Switzerland. The coverage was limited to German-speaking Switzerland and had overspill to Romandy in the Rostigräden area.

From January 1994, S Plus started carrying repeats of SF DRS's Tagesschau, followed by Romansh-language programming starting in April that year. These programmes included newscast Telesguard three times a week (Mondays, Wednesdays and Fridays), Sunday programme by Svizra Rumantscha fortnightly, the live magazine show Damondas da..., Tschà for children eight times in the year and Istorgias di buna notg (bedtime story) once a week. All of the programmes were carried with German subtitles.

On 1 March 1995, the channel was renamed Schweiz 4. Unlike the previous S Plus, carriage of the terrestrial signal was nationwide, with the aim of broadcasting one channel per language sector.

On 1 September 1997, Schweiz 4 shut down, being replaced by three individual second networks tied to their respective language broadcasters: SF2 in the German regions, TSR 2 in Romandy and TSI 2 in Ticino.

== Programming ==
Suisse 4, mainly programmed Euronews during the morning. In the afternoon, the Swissview program, consisting of aerial shots from a helicopter flying over the whole of Switzerland, was the channel's most regular program during the two and a half years of its existence. The programme stemmed from the channel's graphic identity, which featured aerial shots of Switzerland taken from a hot air balloon. The idea was created by Marco Fumasoli, who suggested the creation of the programme. Little by little, the program diversified to include series, but mainly cultural and sports programs as well as films and documentaries during the evening. The Suisse 4 program was quite close to that of the later Swiss public channel, HD Suisse.

Among the channel's own productions, the program on federal politics was a first experience of trilingual editorial, located in Bern, near the Federal Palace. There were notably the following polyglot journalists: Massimo Isotta, Nicolas Rossé, Raphaël Engel, Anne-Lise von Bergen, Georges Gandola and others.

== See also ==
- Television in Switzerland
