= HD suisse =

Defunct Swiss high definition channel

HD Suisse
- Country: Switzerland

Programming
- Languages: French, German, Italian, Romansh
- Picture format: 16:9, 720p (HDTV)

Ownership
- Owner: SRG SSR

History
- Launched: 3 December 2007; 18 years ago
- Closed: 31 January 2012; 14 years ago (4 years, 59 days)

HD suisse is a former Swiss high-definition television channel operated by the public service broadcaster SRG SSR. This was the 8th channel launched by SRG SSR, and the first Swiss television channel available in high definition.

The channel began broadcasting on 3 December 2007, at 20:00 CET.

Programming came from the four TV networks operated by SRG SSR (Schweizer Fernsehen, Télévision Suisse Romande, Radiotelevisione svizzera di lingua italiana and Radio Television Rumantscha), plus music concerts and documentaries (produced by National Geographic Channel).

The channel broadcast in all four national languages of Switzerland: German, French, Italian and Romansh.

HD suisse was closed on 31 January 2012, in preparations to launch HD versions of SRG SSR's channels; SRF 1, SRF zwei, RTS Un, RTS Deux, RSI La 1 and RSI La 2 on 29 February 2012.
