= Der Club (talk show) =

Swiss television talk show

- Also known as: Zischtigsclub
- Genre: Weekly talk show
- Presented by: Karin Frei; Mona Vetsch
- Country of origin: Switzerland
- Original language: Swiss German dialect

Production
- Production location: Zürich

Original release
- Network: Schweizer Fernsehen
- Release: 1985

Der Club (The Club) is a weekly Swiss television talk show, aired since 1985 by Schweizer Radio und Fernsehen on Tuesday. It was called Zischtigsclub (Tuesday Club) until 2005. The format is an adaptation of the Austrian Club 2. It is dedicated to current social and political themes. Occasionally, it has discussed themes related to the media as Medienclub. Several times a year, it is held as Literaturclub, focused on books.

== History and format ==
=== Der Club ===
The format has been presented since 1985 on SRF 1. For around 80 minutes, a current topic is discussed, most often by six people from different backgrounds, with a focus on the relevance for society. The discussion is held in the local dialect. The first topic was "No Future". The atmosphere is reminiscent of a lounge (de). The format was first called Zischtigsclub, a name kept until 2005 and still used colloquially. Two presenters alternate; as of 2019 they are Karin Frei, who succeeded Christine Maier in 2011, and Mona Vetsch, who succeeded Röbi Koller in 2012.

Leaders of the staff have included:

- Peter Schellenberg (to 1990)
- Ueli Heiniger (to 2006)
- Christine Maier (to 2011)
- Karin Frei (since 2011)

=== Medienclub ===
Since May 2013, Der Club has occasionally been dedicated to topics from the media and presented as Medienclub. In this format, it was first aired on 28 May 2013, under the title "Sind Medien Terrorhelfer?" (Do the media help terrorism?) and discussed the role of the media in the murder of Lee Rigby. The format was aired only a few times, but was revived on 10 November 2015, with presenter Franz Fischlin and four guests, discussing "Ohnmächtige Vierte Gewalt, wenn das Publikum die Medien dirigiert".

=== Literaturclub ===
Since 1990, Der Club has been replaced eight to ten times each year by the Literaturclub, devoted to literature. The discussions in this format are not in Swiss dialect but in standard German. The talks take around 75 minutes, focused on books, and involve a presenter, one often prominent guest and two professional literary critics. All participants may suggest a book. In the first airing in this format, Andreas Isenschmid, who had designed the format, Gunhild Kübler, Iso Camartin and presenter Charles Clerc appeared. Other critics who shaped the format have included Gabriele von Arnim, Corina Caduff and Peter Hamm.

The Literaturclub series was held at a bookstore of Orell Füssli, which sponsored it from 2006. Beginning in 2008, it was sponsored by the Thalia bookstore. From 2010, the format was aired from the Papiersaal at the Sihlcity in Zürich.

Since September 2014, the Literaturclub has been presented by Nicola Steiner, with critics including Martin Ebel, Elke Heidenreich, Milo Rau, Rüdiger Safranski, Thomas Strässle and Philipp Tingler. The broadcast has been repeated by 3sat on one of the following Sundays.
