= Bigna Silberschmidt =

Swiss journalist and news presenter

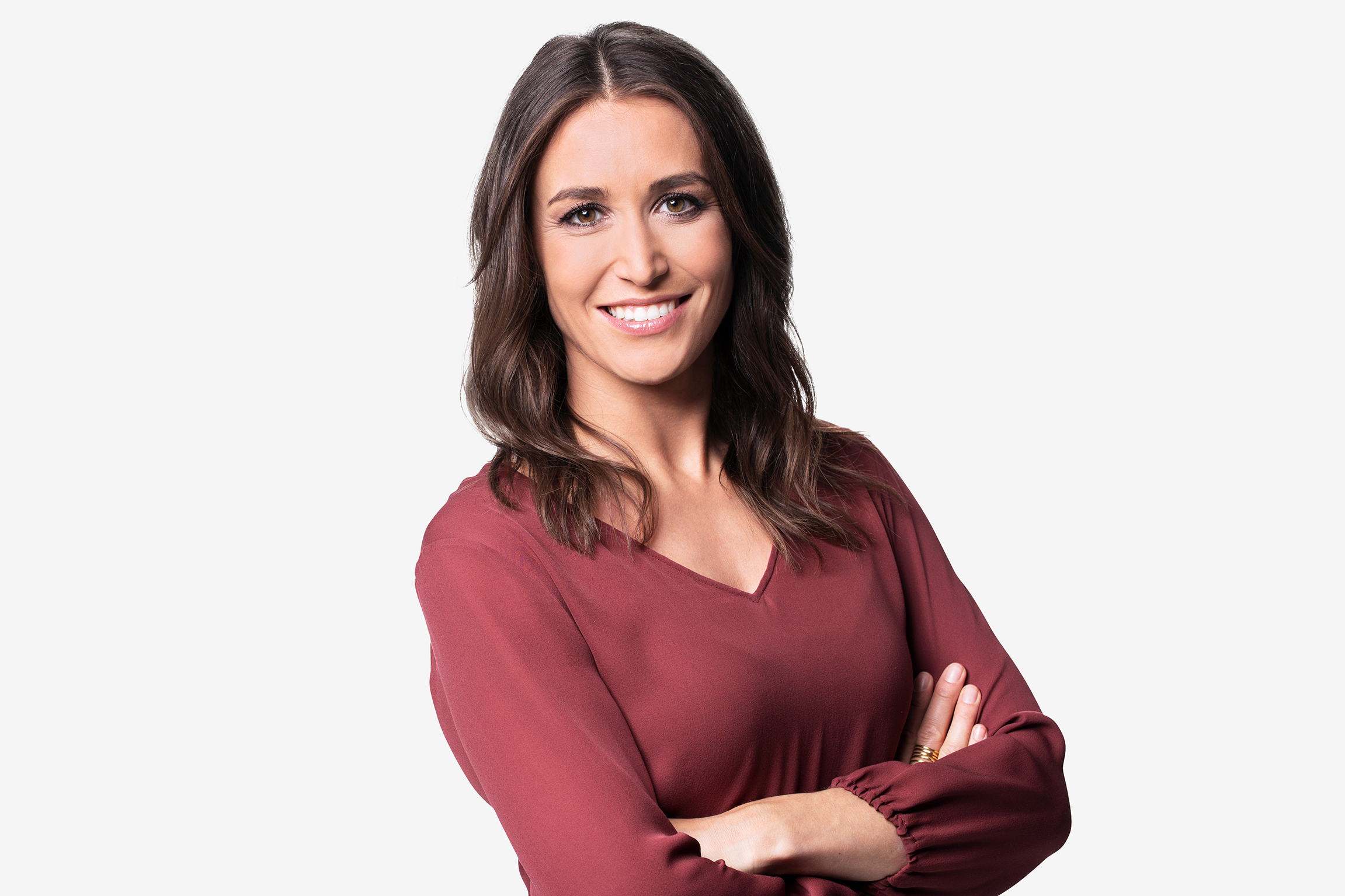
- Silberschmidt, c. 2020
- Born: Bigna Sereina Silberschmidt; 16 December 1985 (age 40); St. Gallen, Switzerland
- Education: University of Fribourg (MS)
- Occupations: Journalist, news presenter
- Relatives: Andri Silberschmidt (second cousin)

Bigna Sereina Silberschmidt (born 16 December 1985) is a Swiss journalist and news presenter for Swiss Radio and Television. In 2020 she became an anchor for the daily news program 10vor10 and deputy of Einstein (science program). Previously she worked as presenter of Schweiz aktuell and in the domestic news department. She is a second cousin of National Councilor Andri Silberschmidt (b. 1994).
