= DOK (TV series) =

Swiss documentary television series

- Genre: Documentaries and reportages
- Directed by: Marius Born, head Dokumentarfilm und Reportage; Nathalie Rufer, deputy head, head Reporter and Mitenand; Belinda Sallin, head DOK in-house productions Frank Senn, head DOK serials Michèle Sauvain, head team Sonderprogramme und Koproduktionen; Urs Augstburger, responsible Pacte
- Country of origin: Switzerland
- Original language: German

Production
- Running time: ~40 minutes

Original release
- Network: SRF 1, SRF info
- Release: 1990 – present

Related
- 10vor10, Schweiz aktuell

DOK (German shortform for documentary) is the title of a show on German-speaking Swiss public channel SRF 1.

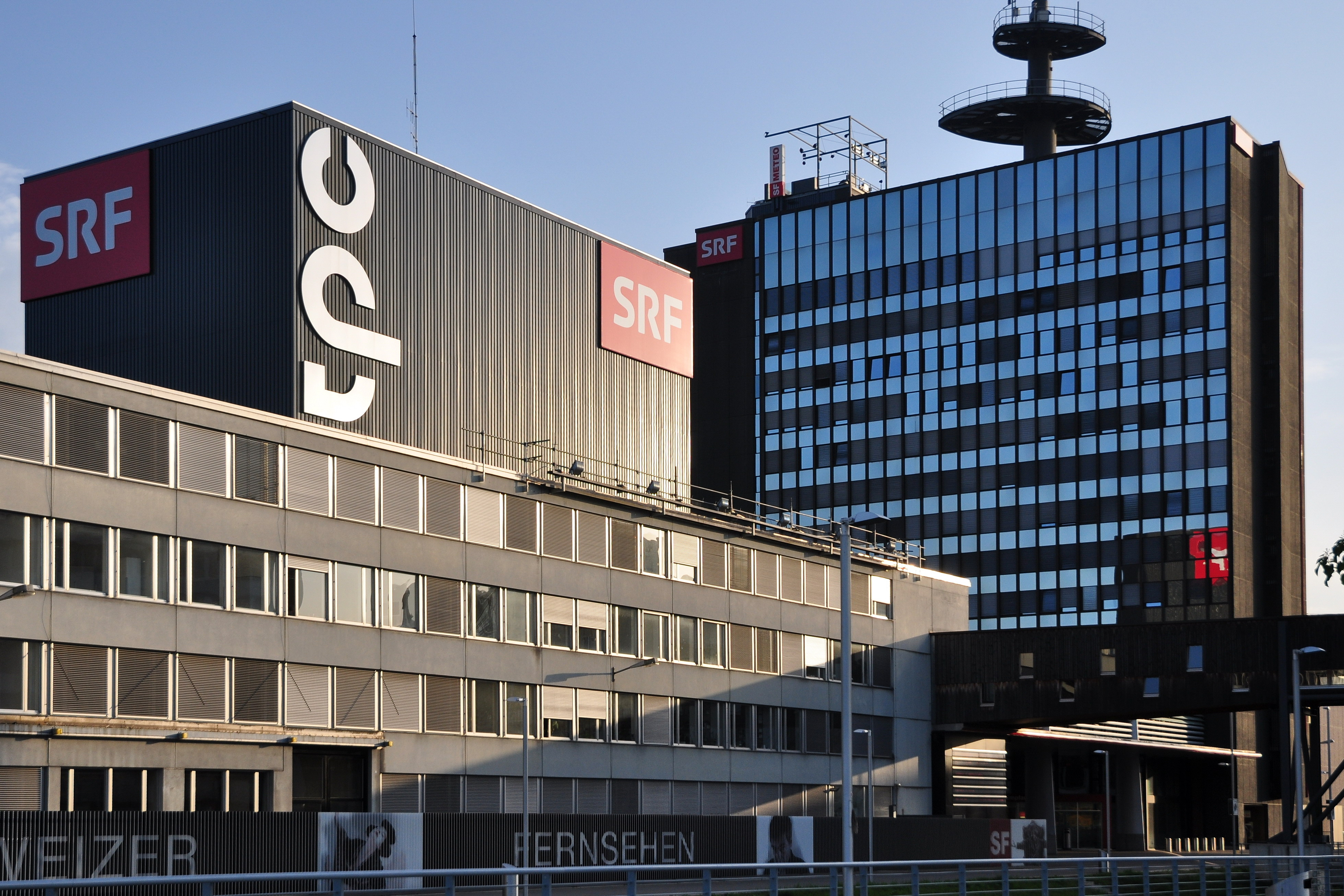
SRF studio Leutschenbach

== Background and contents ==
Started in 1990, DOK usually is broadcast on Wednesday, Thursday and partially on Sunday from 20:05 to 20:50 on SRF 1 and repeated on SRF info. The documentary television series focusses on personalities, social life, current affairs, but also historical issues, among others the Wauwilermoos internment camp during World War II. DOK claims to maintain the long form [news], the second look behind the news topicality, stories, as unique as the life, first hand recounted. The team therefore produces in-house content, but also serial documentaries, for instance on Swiss migrants to other countries, but also DOK broadcasts productions of other television channels.

DOK am Mittwoch (literally "DOK on Wednesday") presents international documentaries on current themes: enthralling stories about human coexistence, and about politically relevant issues. Stories about movies from the free Swiss filmmaking complement the range. DOK am Donnerstag shows on Thursday challenging productions from Switzerland and outstanding international documentaries related to society, economy, politics, nature, adventure and contemporary history.

On Sunday, DOK focusses on exciting stories, moving stories, well-researched reports with enchanting beautiful animal and landscape paintings. The documentaries have a wide range of topics - ranging from historical topics to nature, science, discovery, archeology and adventure to society and politics, suitable for families and to deepen the knowledge of the viewers.
