= Kupetzky (TV series) =

Kupetzky was an Austrian TV show aired on ORF1 in the frame of Donnerstag Nacht from March to June 2006. It was also shown on Swiss channel SF2 later that year.

== The show ==
Kupetzky can't be assigned to a certain genre. According to ORF the show is a mixture of infotainment and fiction. Kupetzky moves through time and space in a bizarre and surreal universe. In the beginning of the show you see Kupetzky in a black cadillac driving on the street. A woman's voice called "Carla" is screaming "Krrrupetky" from the radio receiver, whereas Kupetzky corrects his name most of the time. The voice in the radio receiver then refers him to a person in need as Kupetzky's main job is to solve problems. No matter what problem one of his clients has got, whether you suffer from insomnia, you are trying to establish a new religion or your parachute won't open - he can solve it. The figure of Kupetzky is in the style of movie characters such as "Mr Fix It" (Wag the Dog) and "Mr Wolf" (Pulp Fiction). The background music consists mainly of songs by Elvis, who appears to be Kupetky's role model.

== Visual appearance ==
The show is characterised by fast cuts and soft tracking shots. The single settings are as different as the place of action. The car rides are realised with chroma key with backgrounds such as highways, strange landscapes and famous emblems. Further also animated backgrounds are shown. The location "Petrol Station" which is shown in several episodes is in Gaaden (Lower Austria).

== Cast and crew ==
- Kupetzky: Erhard Hartmann
- Carla: Angelika Niedetzky
- Written by: David Schalko
- Director: Chris Raiber
- Cinematography: Max Meissl
- Company: Neue Sentimental Film Entertainment GmbH

== Awards ==
The show won Bronze at the New York Festival in the category "Young Adult Special" in 2007.
