= Urs Gredig =

- Born: Urs Gredig; 3 June 1970 (age 54); Davos, Switzerland
- Occupation: Journalist
- Known for: SRF Tagesschau, 10vor10, CNN Money
- Spouse: Marion Esther Zihler (m. 2007)
- Children: 2

Urs Gredig (born 3 June 1970) is a Swiss broadcast journalist and former news anchor of SRF Tagesschau and 10vor10.

== Career ==
He formerly was also editor-in-chief of CNN Money Switzerland between 2017 and 2020. Since 2020, he is the talkshow host of Gredig direkt which is the successor talk show of Schawinski.
