= Einstein (Swiss TV series) =

- logo as of 2013
- Genre: Infotainment; Science, people, history Reportages
- Presented by: Kathrin Hönegger; Tobias Müller
- Country of origin: Switzerland
- Original language: German

Production
- Running time: 40 minutes

Original release
- Network: SRF 1, SRF info
- Release: April 17, 2007 – present

Related
- Schweiz aktuell, 10vor10

Einstein is the title of an infotainment show on the German-speaking Swiss public television channel SRF 1. Einstein is an in-house production by Schweizer Radio und Fernsehen (SRF) and reports on phenomena and mysteries of everyday life and of life.

== Profile ==
Einstein is a science magazine of the national Swiss radio and television network Schweizer Radio und Fernsehen, and weekly reports on current and profound topics from all fields of science by stories that inform, educate and entertain. This includes conventional science topics, as well as phenomena and mysteries of everyday life to explain sophisticated scientific topics by an experience reportage. For instance, Tobias Müller and Kathrin Hönegger, the present (as of July 2015) moderation crew participate in science experiments, assisted by science experts of the related fields that are documented. The posts of about 10 minutes are produced weekly, focus on Swiss national stories, and added by Einstein Spezial specials that are focussed on events of common interest, for instance on horse breeding in Switzerland, Swiss history related topics, important international science perceptions, and so on.

== Broadcast ==
Einstein started on 7 April 2007 and is broadcast from 21:00 to 21:50 on Thursday, except on public holidays. All contributions are available as a video stream, and usually additionally contents expound the weekly contributions. Einstein is broadcast widely in the Swiss Standard German language, excluded some interviews in Swiss German. After the premiere on SRF 1, the program is repeated several times on SRF 1 and SRF info. The journalistic use of the Swiss German language, mainly in direct conversation with interviewees as also practiced in 10vor10 and Schweiz aktuell, is a further 'trademark'.
