= Gredig =

Gredig is a surname. Notable people with the surname include:

- Corina Gredig (born 1987), Swiss politician
- Jürgen Gredig (born 1966), German footballer
- Urs Gredig (born 1970) is a Swiss broadcast journalist

== See also ==
- Greig
- Greding
