= Höhne =

Höhne or Hoehne is a German surname. Notable people with the surname include:

- André Höhne (born 1978), German race walker
- Björn Höhne (born 1991), German volleyball player
- Christoph Höhne (born 1941), retired race walker
- Frederico Carlos Hoehne (1882–1959), Brazilian botanist
- Friedrich Höhne (1915–1962), highly decorated Oberstleutnant in the Wehrmacht during World War II
- Gustav Höhne (1893–1951), highly decorated General der Infanterie in the Wehrmacht during World War II
- Heinz Höhne (1926–2010), German journalist and historian
- Holger Höhne (born 1970), German curler
- Jutta Höhne (born 1951), German fencer
- Klaus Höhne (1927–2006), German actor
- Knut Höhne (born 1949), German fencer
- Mia Höhne (born 2000), German curler
- Otto Höhne (1895–1969), German World War I flying ace
- Friedrich Kaufmann Höhne (1831–1879), South African politician
- Verena Hoehne (1945–2012), Swiss journalist and author
- Höhne, a character in the television science fiction series Andromeda

== See also ==
- Hoehne, Colorado, an unincorporated town and a U.S. Post Office in Las Animas County, Colorado, United States
- Hohne (disambiguation)
- Hohn (disambiguation)
