= Beat Glogger =

Beat Glogger (born 12 March 1960) is a Swiss science journalist, television host, and author.

He studied biology and biochemistry in Zurich, graduated as a journalism major, and went on to present MTW, a popular Swiss science TV programme. In 2006 he was nominated for the Descartes Prize in Science Communication awarded by the European Commission; in 2008 he was named the Science Journalist of the Year.

== Books ==
He wrote fiction as well as science; his novel, Xenesis was awarded the Media Prix in 2005 by the Swiss Academy of Natural Sciences, and published in Czech and Slovak as well as the original German. Another novel, Lauf um mein Leben, was published in 2008.
