= Peter Hamm =

German writer and literary critic (1937–2019)

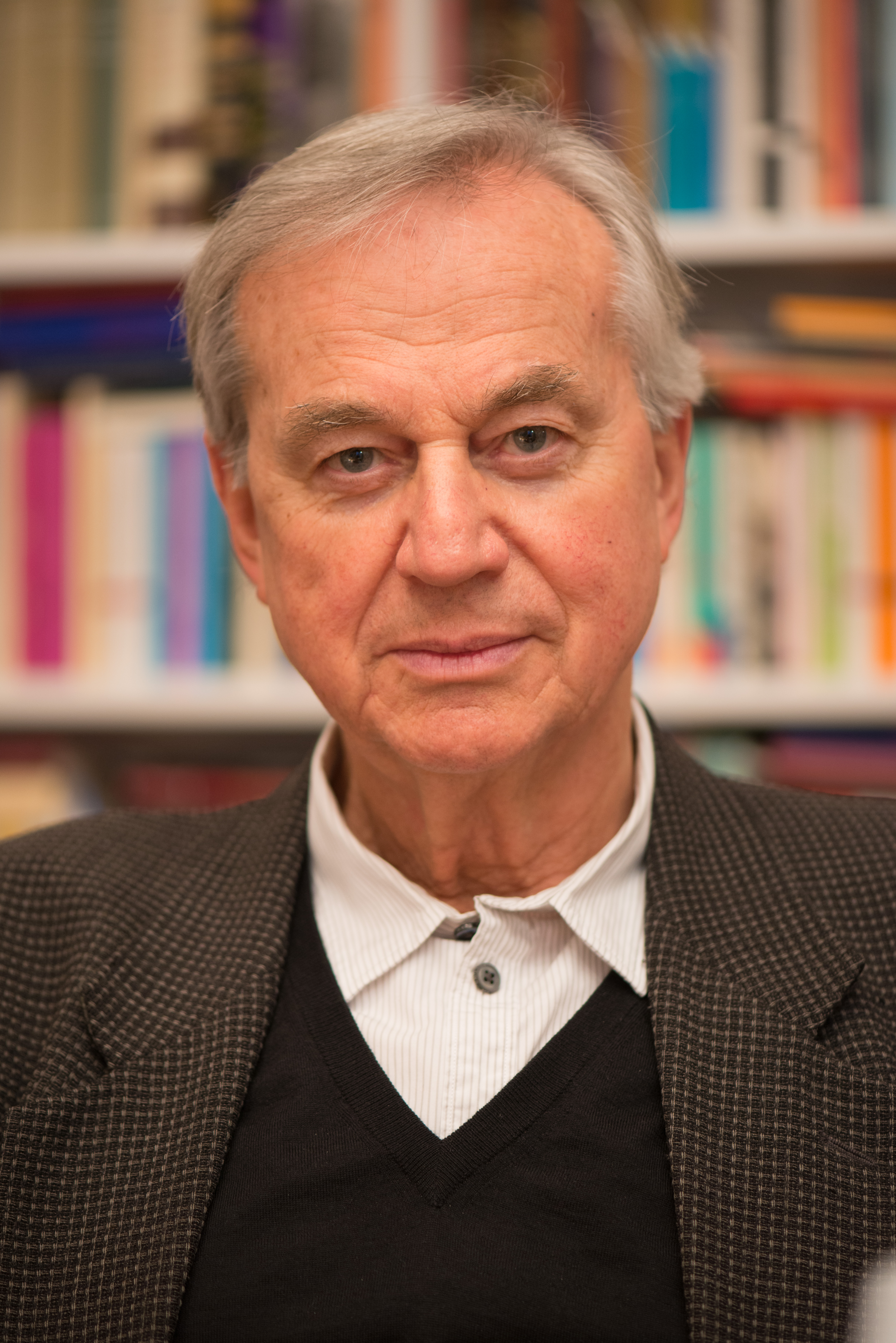
- Hamm in 2017
- Born: 27 February 1937; Munich, Germany
- Died: 22 July 2019 (aged 82); Tutzing, Germany
- Occupations: Poet; author; editor; literary critic
- Organizations: Der Spiegel; Die Zeit; Bayerischer Rundfunk; Schweizer Fernsehen
- Partner(s): Marianne Koch (c. 1970s; d. 2019)
- Awards: Grimme-Preis

Peter Hamm (27 February 1937 – 22 July 2019) was a German poet, author, journalist, editor, and literary critic. He wrote several documentaries, including ones about Ingeborg Bachmann and Peter Handke. He wrote for the German weekly newspapers Der Spiegel and Die Zeit, among others. From 1964 to 2002, Hamm worked as contributing editor for culture for the broadcaster Bayerischer Rundfunk. He was also a jury member of literary prizes, and critic for a regular literary club of the Swiss television company Schweizer Fernsehen.

== Early life and education ==
Hamm was born in Munich in 1937. His mother died in 1940, and he grew up with her parents in Weingarten, Oberschwaben, and in several Catholic boarding schools. He dropped out of school at age 14. He worked on a farm and began as an apprentice to be a bookseller, but did not complete it.

== Career ==
His first published poems appeared in the literary magazine Akzente in 1954 when he was age 17 and in 1956 he was invited to read at the Gruppe 47. From 1959, he travelled to the GDR several times where he met authors such as Peter Huchel and Sarah Kirsch. He met Paul Celan in Paris. He studied literature not at universities, but by means of direct communication with authors, including Nelly Sachs, with whom he corresponded.

Hamm worked for the publisher Neske Verlag from 1959 to 1960. He then was a freelance writer and journalist, publishing literary and music criticism in Der Spiegel and Die Zeit, among others. From 1964 to 2002, Hamm worked as Kulturredakteur (contributing editor for culture) for the Bayerischer Rundfunk. He wrote several television documentaries, including portraits of Ingeborg Bachmann, Heinrich Böll, Peter Handke and Martin Walser.

Hamm was a member of the Deutsche Akademie für Sprache und Dichtung from 1991, serving as its vice president, and of the Bayerische Akademie der Schönen Künste from 1996. He was a member of the German section of the Pen Zentrum. He was a jury member of the Petrarca-Preis, the Peter Huchel Prize and of the monthly Preis der SWR-Bestenliste, among others. He belonged to the critics team of the monthly Literaturclub of the Schweizer Fernsehen from 1990 to 2014. He received the Grimme-Preis in 1976 for Die verbotene Schönheit, a film about Hans Werner Henze.

== Personal life and death ==
Since the 1970s, Hamm had been the partner of Marianne Koch. They lived in Tutzing.

Hamm died on 22 July 2019. A cause of death was not given.

== Published works ==
=== Poetry collections ===
- Sieben Gedichte, (cover: HAP Grieshaber). Stierstadt im Taunus (Eremiten-Presse) 1958
- Der Balken, Gedichte. Munich - Vienna (Carl Hanser Verlag) 1981
- Die verschwindende Welt, Gedichte, Hanser 1985
- Die verschwindende Welt, Gedichte, Frankfurt am Main (Fischer Taschenbuch Verlag) 1988
- Den Traum bewahren, Gedichte und Essays, editor: Gisela Lindner, Friedrichshafen 1989

=== Essay collections ===
- Der Wille zur Ohnmacht, Munich - Vienna (Edition Akzente, Carl Hanser Verlag) 1992
- Aus der Gegengeschichte / Lobreden und Liebeserklärungen, Munich - Vienna n (Edition Akzente Carl Hanser Verlag) 1997
- Die Kunst des Unmöglichen oder Jedes Ding hat (mindestens) drei Seiten. Aufsätze zur Literatur., Munich - Vienna (Edition Akzente Carl Hanser Verlag) 2007
- Pessoas Traum oder: "Sei vielgestaltig wie das Weltall!" Aufsätze zur Literatur., Munich - Vienna (Edition Akzente Carl Hanser Verlag) 2012
- Ins Freie! Wege, Umwege und Irrwege in der modernen Schweizer Literatur., Zürich (Limmat Verlag) 2014
- Peter Handke und kein Ende. Stationen einer Annäherung.. Wallstein, Göttingen 2017, ISBN 978-3-8353-3156-3

=== Essay ===
- Untröstlichkeit und Trost – eulogy for the recipient of the Herbert von Karajan Music Prize, Alfred Brendel, in Alfred Brendel zu Ehren, Warmbronn (Verlag Ulrich Keicher) 2009

=== Talks as books ===
- Peter Handke / Peter Hamm: Es leben die Illusionen – Gespräche in Chaville und anderswo. Göttingen (Wallstein Verlag) 2006
  - French edition: Vive les illusions! Entretiens. Traduit de l'allemand par Anne Weber. Paris (Christian Bourgois Éditeur) 2008
  - Spanish edition: Vivan las ilusiones – Conversaciones en Chaville Y en otros lugares. Traducción de Eustaquio Barjau. Valencia (De la Presente Edición: Pre-Textos) 2011
- Thomas Bernhard / Peter Hamm: Sind Sie gern böse? Ein Nachtgespräch zwischen Thomas Bernhard und Peter Hamm im Hause Bernhard in Ohlsdorf. Frankfurt am Main (Suhrkamp-Verlag) 2011
  - Spanish edition: ?Le gusta ser malvado? Trad. del alemán por Miguel Sáenz. Madrid (Alianza Editorial) 2013

=== As editor ===
- Licht hinterm Eis – Schwedische Lyrik von 1900 – 1957. Auswahl und Übersetzung gemeinsam mit Stig Schönberg von Peter Hamm. Stierstadt im Taunis (Verlag Eremiten Presse) 1957
- Die Kornblumen und die Städte – Tschechische Poesie unseres Jahrhunderts. Herausgegeben und übertragen gemeinsam mit Elisabeth Borchers von Peter Hamm. Stierstadt im Taunus (Verlag Eremiten Presse) 1962
- Aussichten – Junge Lyriker des deutschen Sprachraums - vorgestellt von Peter Hamm. Munich (Biederstein Verlag) 1966
- Welches Tier gehört zu dir? Eine poetische Arche Noah – errichtet von Peter Hamm. Munich / Vienna (Carl Hanser Verlag) 1984
- Kennst du das Land, wo die Zitronen blühn – Italien im deutschen Gedicht. Herausgegeben von Peter Hamm. Frankfurt am Main (Insel Verlag) 1987
- Kritik / von wem / für wen / wie – Eine Selbstdarstellung der Kritik. Herausgegeben von Peter Hamm. Munich (Carl Hanser Verlag) 1968
  - Spanish edition: Critica de la Critica. Barcelona (Barral) 1971
- Artur Lundkvist Gedichte, edited and with an epilogue by Hamm, Cologne – Berlin (Verlag Kiepenheuer & Witsch) 1963
- Peter Handke / Hermann Lenz: Briefwechsel. Mit einem Essay von Peter Hamm., Frankfurt am Main (Insel Verlag) 2006

=== TV film ===
- Alfred Brendel, Pianist. Ein Porträt., book and direction, 45’. Radio Bremen 1973
- Alfred Brendel spielt Schubert. TV series in 13 sequences, music and image direction, Radio Bremen (Studio Hamburg) 1976–1977
- Heinrich Böll – Nobelpreisträger, book and direction, 60', from the series Nobelpreisträger, Bavaria Produktionsgesellschaft 1974
- Die verbotene Schönheit – der Komponist Hans Werner Henze, book and direction, 90', Westdeutscher Rundfunk 1976 (Grimme-Preis)
- "Der ich unter Menschen nicht leben kann". Auf der Suche nach Ingeborg Bachmann., book and direction, 120', Westdeutscher Rundfunk / SWF 1980.
- "Ich stehe immer noch vor der Tür des Lebens". Robert Walser und die schöne Kunst des Unterliegens., book and direction, 120', SWF/WDR 1986

=== Films ===
- The Morals of Ruth Halbfass, script, directed by Volker Schlöndorff, 1972
- Stayover in Tyrol, script, directed by Schlöndorff, 1973
