= Hohne (disambiguation) =

Hohne may refer to one of the following:

- Hohne, a municipality in Germany
- Bergen-Hohne, a military training ground and garrison

== See also ==
- Hohn (disambiguation)
- Höhne (disambiguation)
