= Xenesis =

2004 book by Beat Glogger

- Author: Beat Glogger
- Language: German
- Genre: Science Thriller novel
- Published: 2004 (Rowohlt Verlag)
- Publication place: Switzerland
- Media type: Print (Paperback)
- Pages: 383 pp
- ISBN: 978-3-499-23613-6
- OCLC: 254100166

Xenesis is a 2004 techno-thriller by Beat Glogger, a Swiss science journalist, published by Rowohlt Verlag. The book builds around a theme of livestock that are genetically modified for xenotransplantation, as a remedy for human organ donor shortages. A film adaptation may be in progress.

The title combines the Greek words "xenos" ("alien") and "genesis" ("beginning" or "creation").

== Awards ==
The book was awarded the Media Prix in 2005 by the Swiss Academy of Natural Sciences and was nominated for the 2006 Descartes Prize by the European Commission.
