= Hans-Ulrich Bigler =

Swiss politician (born 1958)

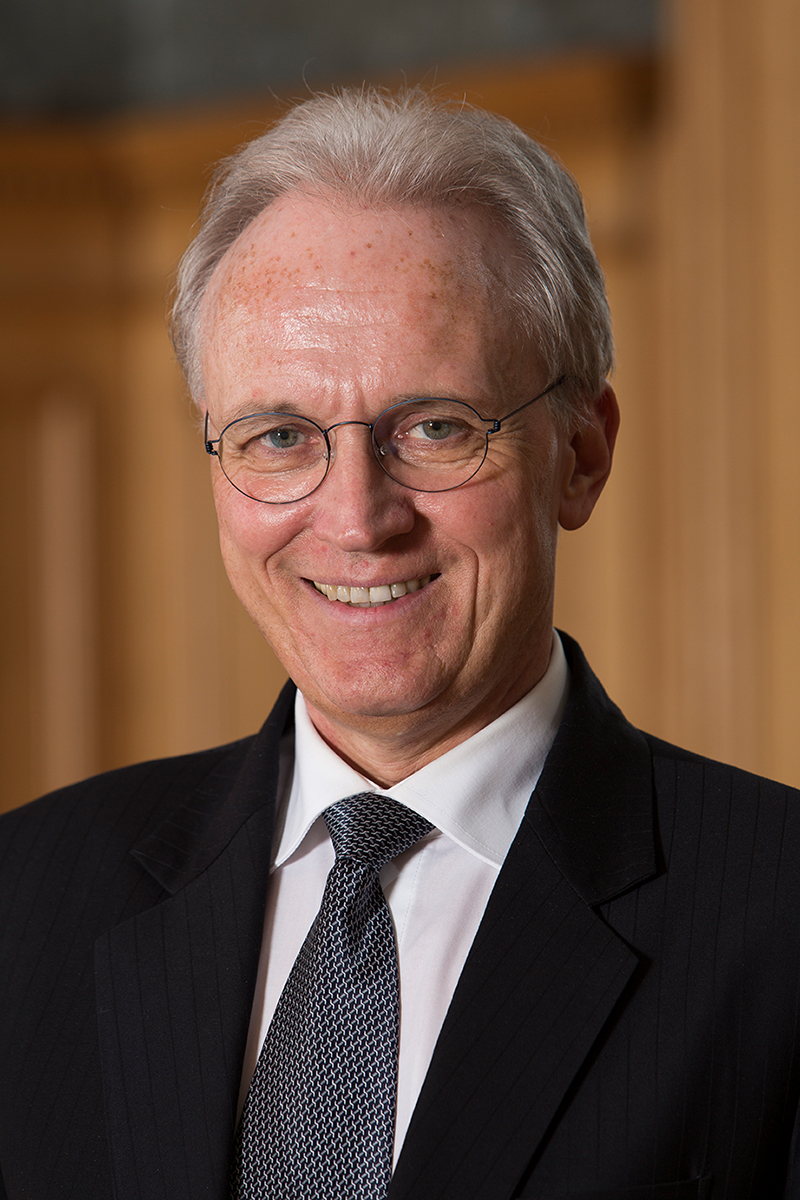
- Bigler in 2014

Member of the National Council (Switzerland)
- In office 8 December 2015 – 1 December 2019
- Succeeded by: Andri Silberschmidt
- Constituency: Canton of Zürich

Personal details
- Born: Hans-Ulrich Bigler; 5 April 1958 (age 68) Bern, Switzerland
- Party: Swiss People's Party
- Other political affiliations: The Liberals (until mid-2022)
- Children: 3
- Education: University of Bern (Licentiate); Harvard Business School (AMP)
- Occupation: Association functionary, politician
- Website: Parliament website

Hans-Ulrich Bigler (German pronunciation: [hans ˈʔʊlʁɪç ˈbɪɡlɐ]; born 5 April 1958) is a Swiss association functionary and politician. He served as director of the Swiss Trade Association from 2008 to 2023 and on the National Council (Switzerland) from 2015 to 2019 for the Free Democratic Party where he was succeeded by Andri Silberschmidt. In 2022 he officially changed his political party affiliation from The Liberals (previously Free Democratic Party) to the Swiss People's Party.
