= RSI La 2 =

- Country: Switzerland

Programming
- Language: Italian
- Picture format: 1080i HDTV (downscaled to 16:9 576i for the SDTV feed)

Ownership
- Owner: Radiotelevisione svizzera di lingua italiana
- Sister channels: RSI La 1

History
- Launched: 1 September 1997
- Replaced: Schweiz 4 (1995–1997)
- Former names: TSI 2 (1997–2009)

Links
- Website: http://la2.rsi.ch/

Availability

Terrestrial
- Digital terrestrial television: ~~Channel 712~~ (only for Italian-speaking Switzerland; ceased on 3 June 2019)

RSI La 2 (RSI La due) is a Swiss public television channel owned by Radiotelevisione Svizzera di lingua Italiana. It is a sister channel of RSI La 1, broadcast in Italian. It mainly airs sport programmes, but also reruns and music shows. It does not broadcast any newscasts.

== History ==
TSI launched its second channel in 1997, basing it on programming for a younger audience and sports. Unlike RSI La 1, until the shutdown of digital terrestrial television in 2019, RSI La 2 was not broadcast across the whole of Switzerland, but only in Italian-speaking Switzerland.

It started broadcasting on 1 September 1997, replacing the former Svizzera 4 but not acting as a direct replacement. Initially, it had a limited fixed schedule from Friday evening to Sunday due to financial constraints. The rest of the week was occupied by a relay of the also newly-launched SF2 (replaced by Euronews in early 1998). New original programmes were created for the new channel, as well as an increase in the amount of sporting events carried.

The channel ended analogue broadcasts on 24 July 2006, from that date being available only on digital terrestrial television, satellite and cable. It was the first channel of the SRG SSR network to make the transition.

== Logos ==
2009-2012

2012-

HD logo, since 2012

== Programmes ==
=== Information ===
- L'Agenda

=== Sport ===
- La domenica sportiva
- SportnonStop

Live sporting events:

- Olympic Games
- FIA Formula One World Championship
- FIFA World Cup
- Premier League
- UEFA Champions League
- UEFA Europa League
- UEFA Super Cup
- Swiss Football League
- Hockey World Cup
- Ice hockey Swiss championship
- FIM MotoGP World Championship
- Cycle races
- Motorcycle racing
- Alpine skiing World Cup

Tennis:

- Australia Open
- Davis Cup
- Internationaux de France de Roland-Garros
- Wimbledon
- US Open

== See also ==
- List of Italian-language television channels
