= Verena Hoehne =

Swiss journalist and author

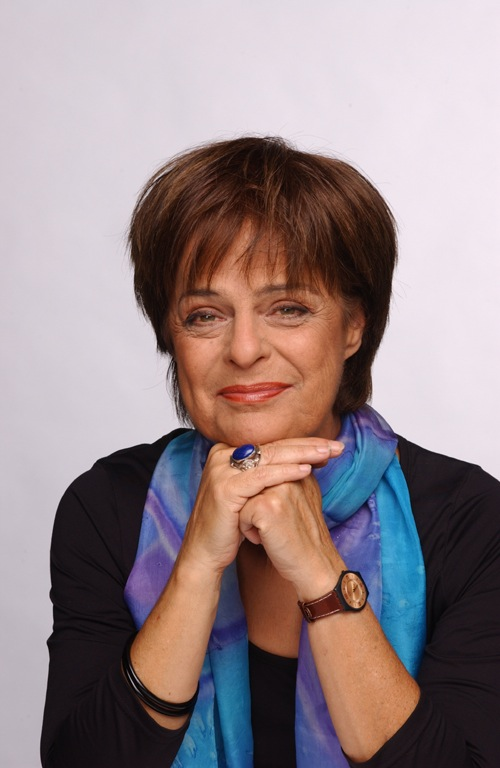
Verena Hoehne

Verena Hoehne (14 January 1945 in Lausanne – 25 January 2012 in Zürich) was a Swiss journalist and author.

== Life ==
Verena Hoehne studied Theatre studies in Marburg, Zurich, Munich and Vienna, where she earned a doctorate on "The Schauspielhaus Zurich 1945–1965".

From 1972 onwards, Verena Hoehne worked as a journalist for Schweizer Fernsehen, where she run her own cultural magazine called Scheinwerfer as well as several documentaries and news features on theater and other cultural topics. She also carried out interviews in the series "Begegnungen" (encounters) for the German-speaking regional TV station 3sat. In the 1980s and 1990s Verena Hoehne was a commentator for the news broadcast on Swiss national television as well as for live broadcasts of the ballet competition Prix de Lausanne and moderator at the cultural broadcast Café Philo of Sternstunde Philosophie. The guests of her interviews and documentaries included Max Frisch, Friedrich Dürrenmatt, Elias Canetti, Maria Becker, Ernst Schröder, Karl Paryla, Franz Hohler, Wolf Biermann and Emil Steinberger.

From 1990 through 2001 Verena Hoehne was in the governing board of Theater am Neumarkt in Zürich and a member of the Swiss Society for Theatre Culture. At the Schauspielhaus Zürich she moderated together with Urs Bircher a series on theatre history as well as matinées with Giorgio Strehler, Georg Tabori, Benno Besson and Werner Düggelin.

She was also an author of non-fiction books on theatre, a teacher at the Zurich University of the Arts and carried out several series of readings including on German author Erich Kästner. In her home town Baden, Switzerland she was involved as a moderator, actor and reader at local theatres Thik, Teatro Palino and cultural events at other venues such as the café Frau Meise.

Verena Hoehne died on 25 January 2012 in Zurich.

== Publications ==
- with Peter Zeindler: Zwei Theater unterwegs. Théâtre Populaire Romand und Theater für den Kanton Zürich, 1981.
- with Christian Jauslin: Dramatiker-Förderung / Aide aux auteurs dramatiques. 1986.
- with Christian Altorfer: Spektakel. Zürcher Theaterspektakel, Internationales Festival Freier Theatergruppen. Werd Verlag Zürich, 1989.
- with Urs Bircher and Martin Kreuzberg: Zürich, eine Theaterlandschaft. 1991.
