= Marie Lindqvist =

Swedish ballet dancer

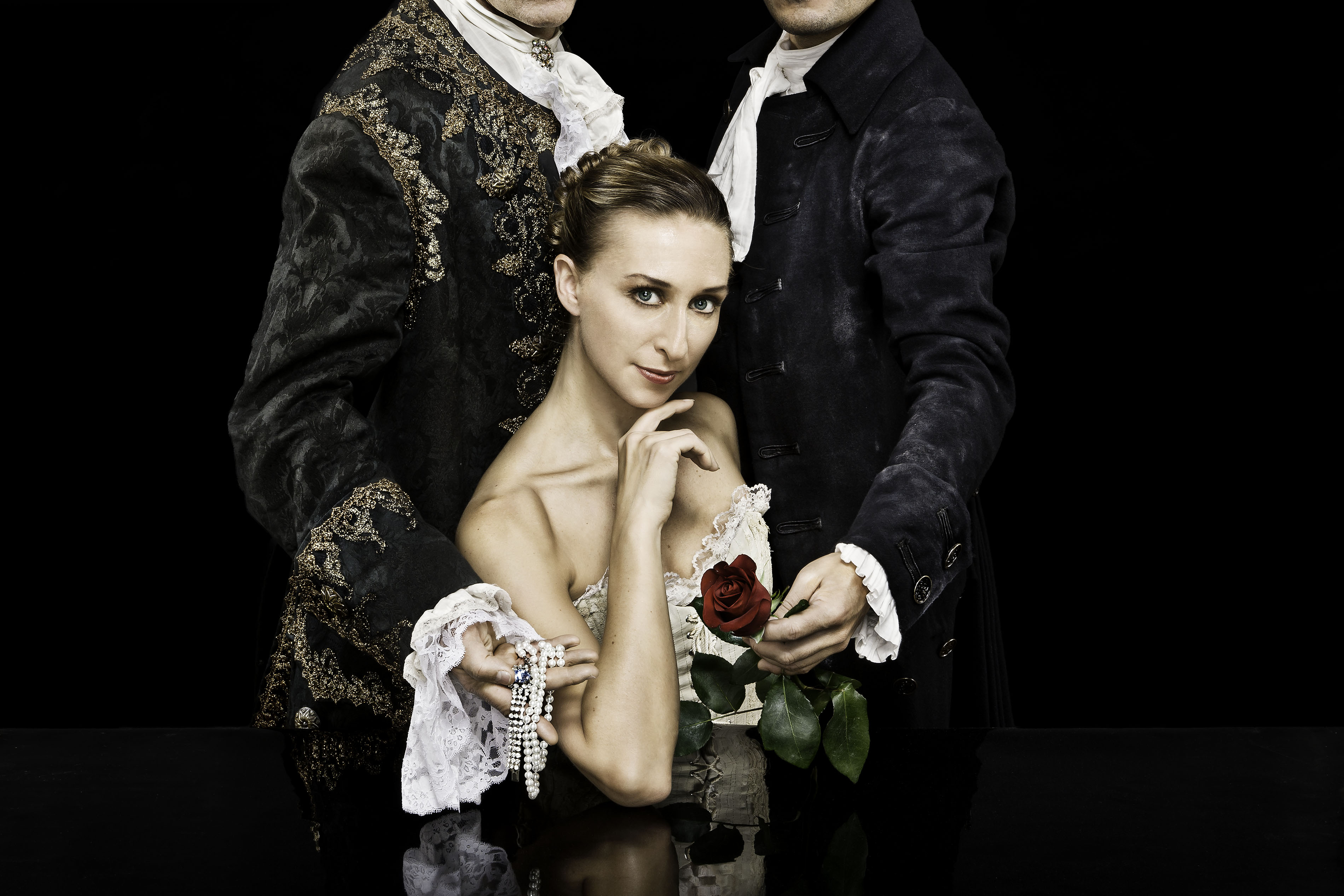
Marie Lindqvist in Manon 2010

Marie Lindqvist (born 20 November 1970) is a Swedish ballet dancer. She has danced with the Royal Swedish Ballet since 1988, becoming a principal dancer in 1993 and a court danser (hovdansare) in 2004. She retired as an active dancer in February 2014.

== Biography ==
Lindqvist received her training at the Royal Theatre Ballet School and the Swedish Ballet School before joining the Royal Swedish Ballet in 1988. She became a soloist in 1991, a principal dancer in 1993 and in 2004 she received the royal title of court dancer. In 2005, she was nominated for the Prix Benois de la Danse, performing in David Dawson's The Grey Area.

Lindqvist's repertoire includes leading roles in many classical ballets including Odette/Odile in Swan Lake, Aurora in The Sleeping Beauty and the title roles in Giselle, Cinderella and Romeo and Juliet as well as in neoclassical and contemporary works including Solveig in John Neumeier's Per Gynt and Bianca in John Cranko's The Taming of the Shrew. She has also performed leading roles in works choreographed by George Balanchine, Jiří Kylián, William Forsythe and others.

Lindqvist has performed widely as a guest artist across Europe and in Japan, China and the United States.

== Farewell performance ==
On 28 February 2014, in her highly acclaimed farewell appearance at the Royal Theatre in Stockholm, Marie Lindqvist danced Tatania in Cranko's Onegin, one of her favourite roles. She now continues her work at the Royal Swedish Ballet as a coach and répétiteur.

== Awards ==
In addition to her elevation to court dancer in 2004, Lindqvist has received the following awards:

- 1990: Kasper Prize from Dagens Nyheter
- 1992: Opera Prize from Svenska Dagbladet
- 1994: Philip Morris Ballet Flower Award
- 1997: Carina Ari Medal
