= Andri Silberschmidt =

Swiss politician (born 1994)

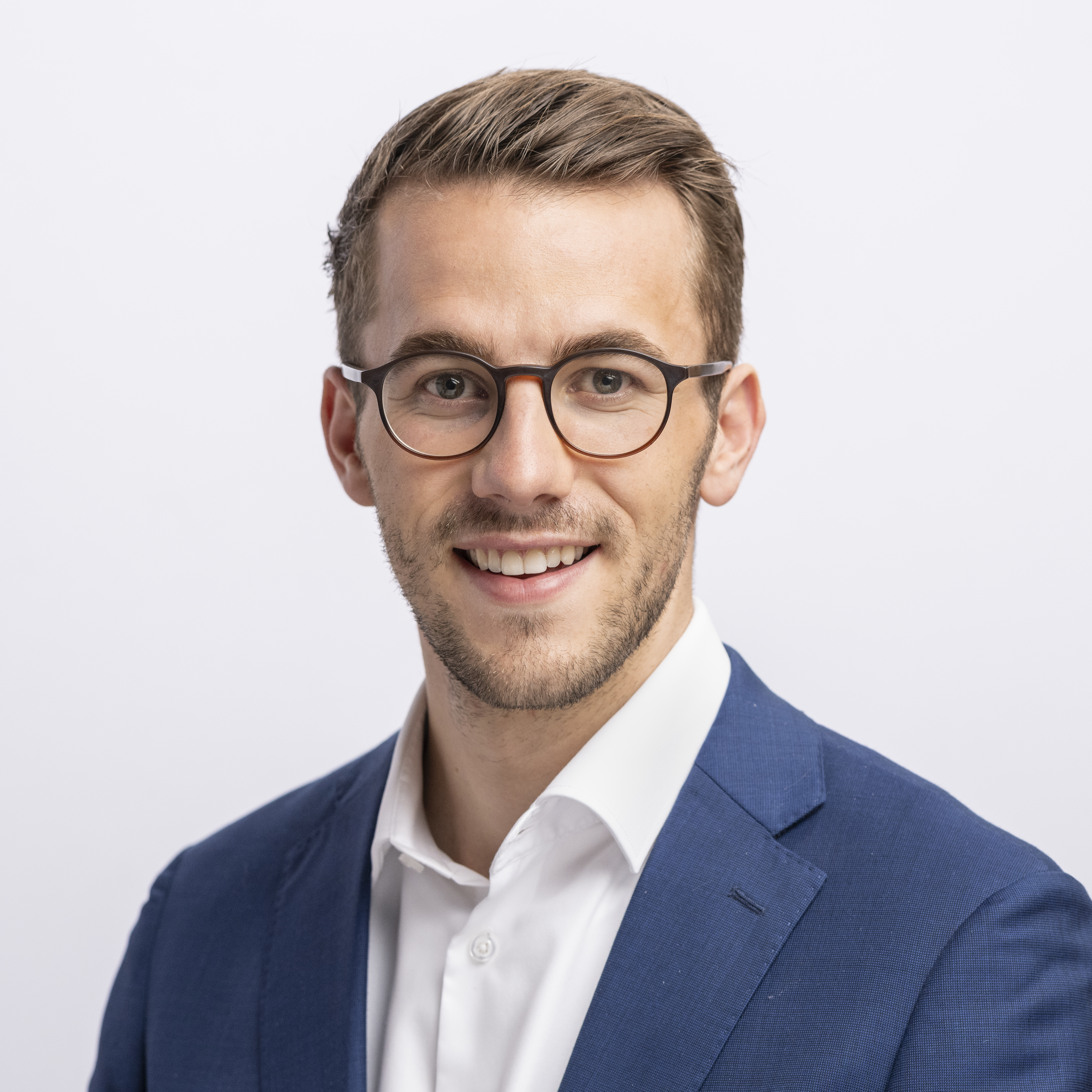
- Official portrait, 2023

Member of the National Council (Switzerland)
- Incumbent
- Assumed office 2 December 2019
- Preceded by: Hans-Ulrich Bigler
- Constituency: Canton of Zürich

Personal details
- Born: Andri Sebastian Silberschmidt; 26 February 1994 (age 32) Zürich, Zürich, Switzerland
- Spouse: Andrea Buhofer (m. 2023)
- Relations: Bigna Silberschmidt (second cousin)
- Children: 2
- Education: Zurich University of Applied Sciences (BS); Bayes Business School (MS)
- Website: Official website Parliament website

Andri Sebastian Silberschmidt colloquially Andri Silberschmidt-Buhofer (German pronunciation: [ˈandʁi ˈzɪlbɐʃmɪt]; born 26 February 1994) is a Swiss businessman, politician and former banker who currently serves on the National Council for The Liberals since 2019.

== Early life and education ==
Silberschmidt was born 26 February 1994 in Zurich, Switzerland, to Georg Silberschmidt, a gymnastics teacher and former coach of the national team in table tennis, and Katharina Silberschmidt (née Wimmer), an interior designer.

His paternal family were Ashkenazi Jews who came to Switzerland from Germany. His ancestor, Moise Silberschmidt (1838–1890), a watchmaker, emigrated to La Chaux-de-Fonds in Romandy, originally being from Niederwerrn, Bavaria. There he was the proprietor of a watch manufacturing company. The Silberschmidt family took Swiss citizenship there in 1875. Some of his ancestors died in the Holocaust.

Silberschmidt dropped out of high school in grade 9. He then ultimately completed a commercial apprenticeship at Zurich Cantonal Bank, concurrently completing professional maturity, between 2009 and 2012. He then studied Business Administration at Zurich University of Applied Science (ZHAW) with an exchange at Cass Business School in London. Silberschmidt graduated with a Master of Science in Global Finance from Bayes Business School (formerly Cass Business School).

== Professional career ==
After completing his commercial apprenticeship, he worked for a subsidiary of Zurich Cantonal Bank, offering financial services and fund services. He specifically managed quantitative funds for the third world.

In 2020, he became the corporate secretary of Planzer Holding Ltd., a major logistics and transportation company, where he formerly was project manager of the CFO office, and assistant to the executive board and board of directors. Concurrently, Silberschmidt is the controlling shareholder and chairman of Silberschmidt Ltd., which is his own holding company for a variety of business interests.

He currently also serves as a strategic advisor for the Marcuard Family Office and president of FH Switzerland. He is currently a board member of Jucker Farm AG as well as Kaisin AG, a poké bole operation with several locations in Swiss cities, which he co-founded in 2017. He is a member of the board of trustees of Stiftung Wohnungen für kinderreiche Familien (en. Foundation Apartments for large families) and the Fritz-Gerber-Stiftung für begabte junge Menschen (en. Fritz-Gerber-Foundation for gifted young people).

== Politics ==
In 2011, Silberschmidt joined the Young Liberals, aged 17. Shortly after joining, he founded the Young Liberals of the Hinwil District group, of which he became the chairman. In 2013, he took over the presidency of the Young Liberals of the Canton of Zurich. From March 2016 to November 2019, Silberschmidt presided over the Young Liberals of Switzerland, with whom he launched the Pension Initiative. His successor in this position was Matthias Müller.

Between 2018 and 2020, Silberschmidt was elected to serve in the Zurich municipal council, where he represented districts 7 and 8. In the 2019 Swiss federal election, Silberschmidt was elected to the National Council (Switzerland) for The Liberals, defeating incumbent Hans-Ulrich Bigler. He was 25 years old which makes him the youngest elected member of the National Council in the 51st legislative period. At The Liberals delegates' meeting on 2 October 2021 he was elected to the vice presidency of The Liberals Switzerland together with Johanna Gapany.

From January to February 2019, he was a participant in the highly selective International Visitor Leadership Program (IVLP) of the United States Department of State, which took place in Washington, D.C., Baltimore, San Francisco, Oklahoma City and Orlando.

== Personal life ==
On 2 November 2023, Silberschmidt married Andrea Buhofer (born 1994), a private investor, daughter of Philipp Heinz Buhofer and Michèle Buhofer, on Lake Zug. They have two children.

They reside in Affoltern am Albis. He is a dual citizen of Switzerland and Germany.
