= David Dimitri =

Swiss tightrope acrobat (born 1963)

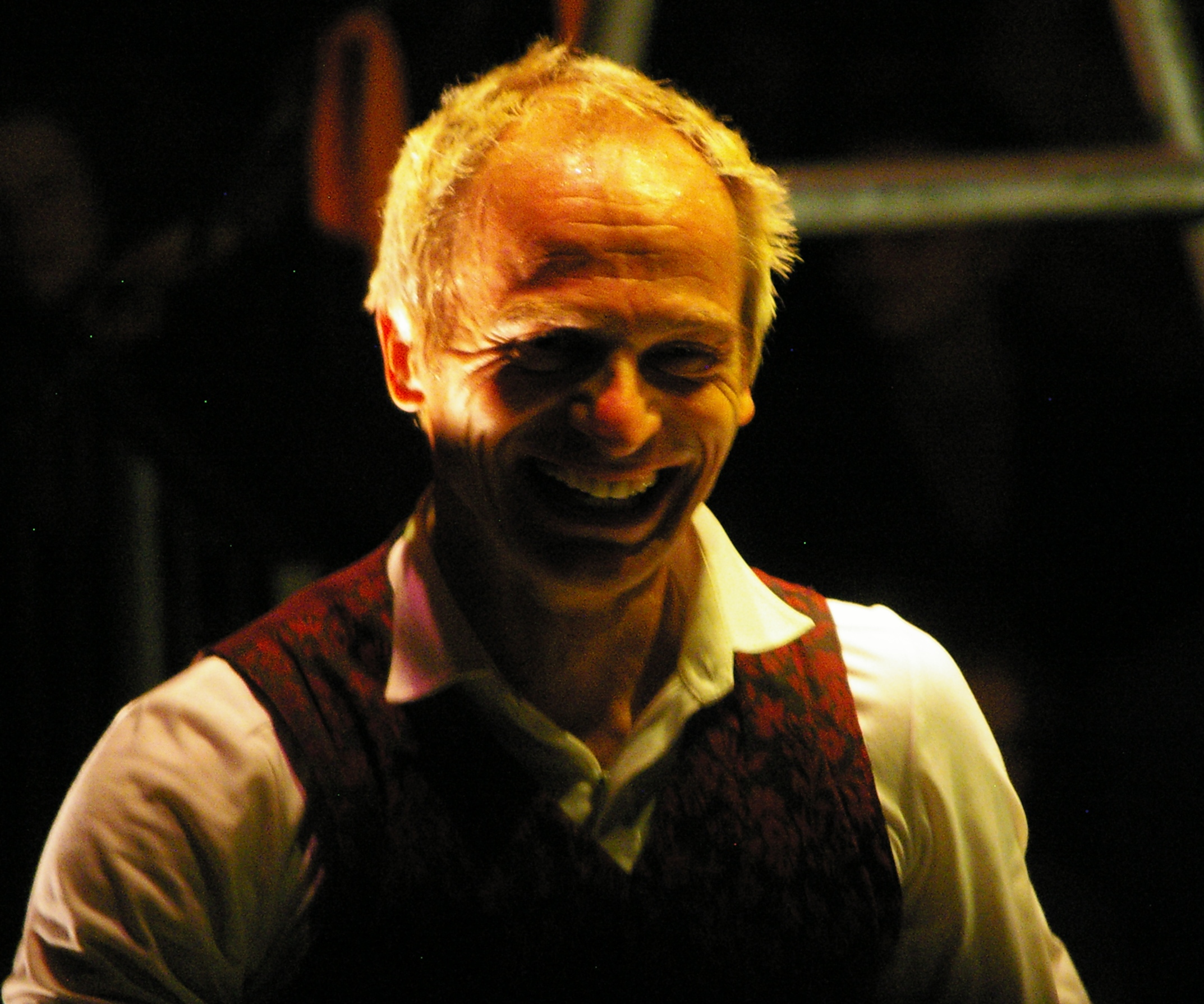
Dimitri in 2014

David Dimitri (born March 7, 1963) is a Swiss tightrope acrobat.

Combining an education at the State Academy for Circus Arts in Budapest and at New York’s Juilliard School, David Dimitri performed his wire dances at circuses, arts festivals, and concert halls throughout the world – Canada’s Cirque du Soleil, New York’s Big Apple Circus, Switzerland's Circus Knie, and the Metropolitan Opera under the direction of Jean-Pierre Ponnelle.

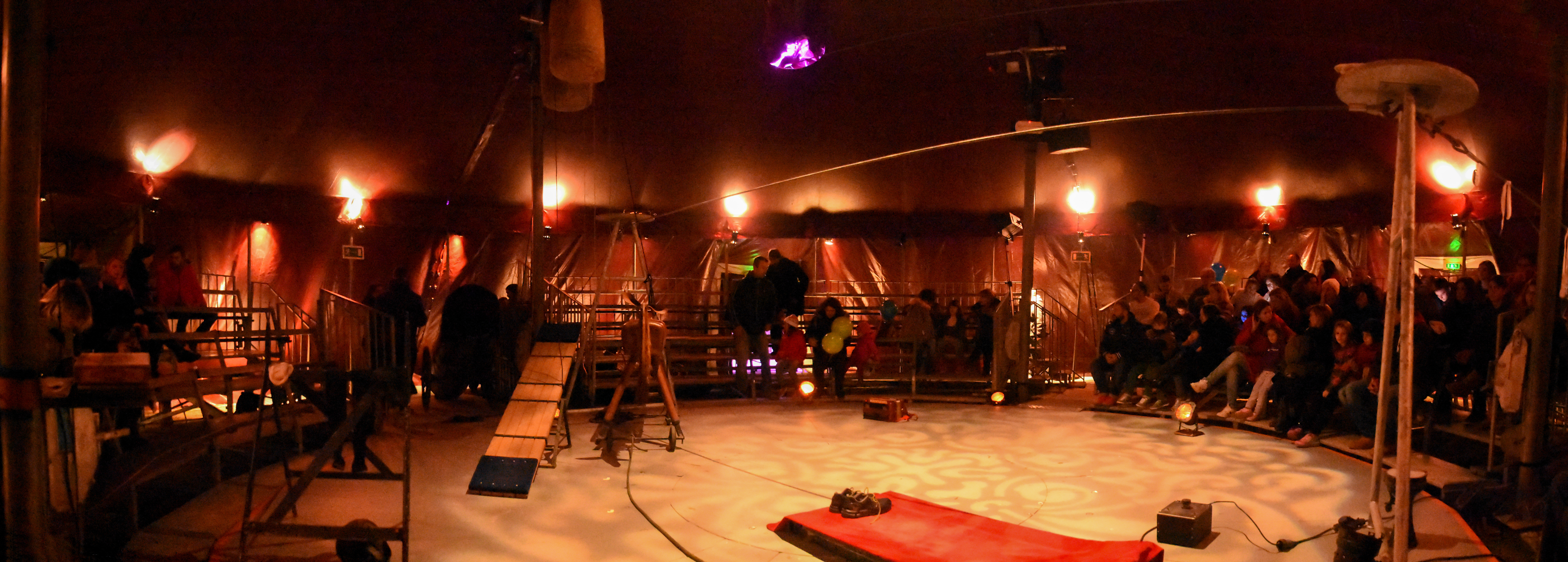
L'Homme Cirque in 2016

In 2001, with the assistance of his father, the clown and mime Dimitri, David Dimitri created the one-man show "L'Homme Cirque" a presentation of nouveau cirque arts performed in a touring circus tent designed and built for the production.
