= Barbara Hohn =

Austrian molecular biologist

- Born: 15 September 1939 (age 86); Klagenfurt, Austria
- Education: University of Vienna
- Awards: ForMemRS
- Scientific career
- Fields: Molecular biology

Barbara Hohn ForMemRS (born 15 September 1939) is an Austrian molecular biologist, particularly known for her research into the Agrobacterium tumefaciens.

== Early life ==
She was born Barbara Freiinger, in Klagenfurt, Austria. From 1957 to 1962, she studied chemistry at the University of Vienna and then worked at the Max Planck Institute for Virus Research at the University of Tübingen, where she received her doctorate in 1967. Her PhD thesis supervisor was Professor Friedrich Freksa.

== Career ==
As a postdoc, she did research at the Universities of Yale and Stanford, and in 1971 at the Biozentrum, University of Basel. In 1978, she became a group leader at the Friedrich Miescher Institute. From 1989, Hohn was associate professor of molecular genetics and in 1996 adjunct professor at the University of Basel. She retired in 2004. Her research topics included the Agrobacterium tumefaciens.

Hohn is a member of the Austrian Academy of Sciences (Math and Science class) and the Royal Society.

== Honours and awards ==
Hohn has been awarded a European Molecular Biology Organisation (EMBO) Lectureship in 1977, and the Science Prize from the City of Basel in 1992. In 2010, she was awarded the Ludwig-Wittgenstein-Preis of the Östreichische Forschungsgemeinschaft (Ludwig Wittgenstein Prize of the Austrian Research Association).

== Personal life ==
She is married to fellow molecular biologist Thomas Hohn. They have two sons.
