= Schweizer Fernsehen =

Former Swiss German-language public television broadcaster

- Type: Cable, terrestrial (DVB-T), satellite and online (Zattoo, Wilmaa)
- Country: Switzerland
- Owner: Schweizer Radio und Fernsehen
- Launch date: 1958; 68 years ago
- Dissolved: 16 December 2012; 13 years ago
- Former names: TV DRS (until 1993); SF DRS (1993–2005)
- Official website: srf.ch
- Replaced by: Schweizer Radio und Fernsehen

Schweizer Fernsehen (SF; "Swiss Television") was the German-language division of SRG SSR, in charge of production and distribution of television programmes in Switzerland for German-speaking Switzerland. It had its head office in Zürich. Its most viewed programme was Tagesschau (news), daily at 7:30 pm.

It was formerly called SF DRS (Schweizer Fernsehen der deutschen und rätoromanischen Schweiz; "Swiss television of German and Romansh Switzerland") until 2005. On 1 January 2011, Schweizer Fernsehen and Schweizer Radio DRS began the process of merging the two entities into Schweizer Radio und Fernsehen (SRF). On 16 December 2012, the merger was complete, with SF and SR DRS adopting the SRF name to their television and radio stations.

== History ==
- 1939: First test transmissions of television
- 1964: Introduction of advertising
- 1968: Colour transmissions begin
- 1984: Introduction of teletext
- 1984: Launch of 3sat, in collaboration with ZDF in Germany and ORF in Austria
- 1997: Launch of SF zwei
- 1999: Launch of SF info in the Zürich region
- 2001: SF info begins broadcasting to the whole of German-speaking Switzerland
- 2005: SF DRS becomes SF, accompanying a major re-brand of the network.
- 2007: Launch of HD suisse in 720p quality (in co-operation with TSR and RSI)
- 2012: HDTV transmission (not all programmes yet) of SF 1, SF zwei and SF info; HD suisse was closed in return

== Television channels ==
- SF 1
- SF zwei
- SF info

== See also ==
- Television in Switzerland
