= Jan Linkens =

Dutch choreographer

Jan Linkens is a Dutch choreographer and former dancer, who was born in Maastricht and studied at the Royal Conservatoire in The Hague. Danza Contemporanea de Cuba commissioned him to make the work Folia in 2010. Linkens is also a dance teacher, and among his pupils is Zoe Greten. He is now principal of the Royal Conservatoire Dance at the Royal Conservatory of The Hague.

Linkens has created over 28 choreographies for major companies including Tanztheater of the Komische Oper in Berlin, and Dutch National Ballet which have been seen worldwide including Turkey, Cuba, Japan, and Australia. He has also created additional choreographies for ballet classics such as La Sylphide.

Among his awards are 14th International Choreography Competition Cologne, the Benois de la Danse Prize, Premio Villanueva for "Best Dance Production in Cuba" in 2003 and the prize of the Cuban artists' organisation UNEAC in 2004.

On June 16, 2013, Dutch choreographer Jan Linkens’s work "Compas" (Beat) was featured in a stellar presentation by one of Cuba's premiere dance ensembles, Danza Contemporánea de Cuba, at Havana's Mella Theater.
