= Souvan House =

Building in Ljubljana, Slovenia

Coordinates: 46°2′59.66″N 14°30′23.15″E

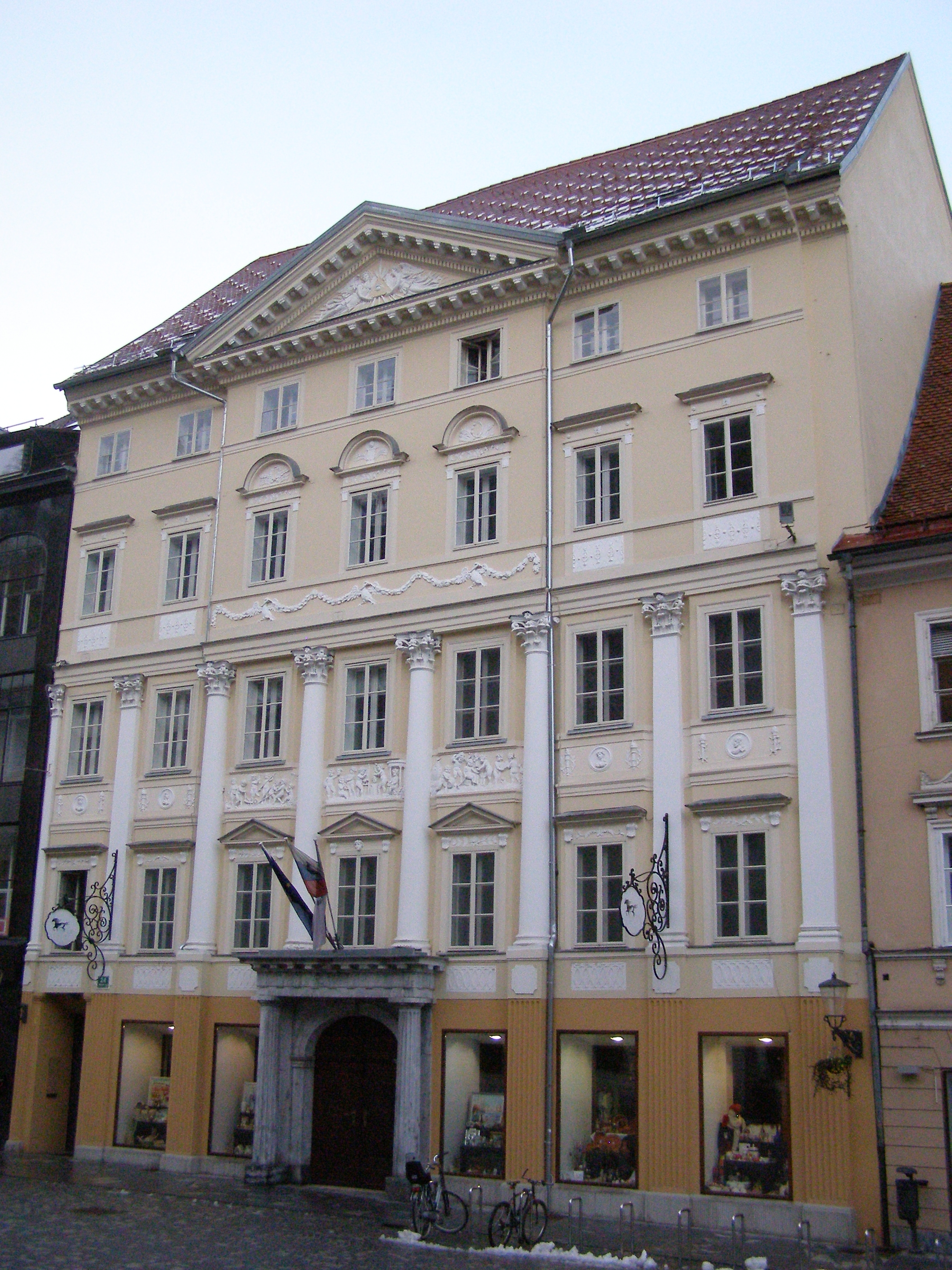
Souvan House

The Souvan House (Slovene: Souvanova hiša) or the Hohn House (Hohnova hiša) is the highest building at Town Square in Ljubljana, the capital of Slovenia. It stands near Ljubljana Town Hall on the opposite (western) side of the square and has the address 24 Town Square. The building was originally erected in the late 17th century and renovated upon the plans by Francesco Coconi in 1827, who raised it and added a shallow avant-corps. Its façade from the early 19th-century is one of the highest-quality examples of Biedermeier architecture in the city. It is decorated with reliefs representing trade, art and agriculture, work by the travelling sculptor Martin Kirschner.
