= SRF info =

Swiss-German television channel

- Country: Switzerland

Programming
- Picture format: 576i (16:9 SDTV); 720p (16:9)

Ownership
- Owner: Schweizer Radio und Fernsehen
- Sister channels: SRF 1 SRF zwei

History
- Launched: 3 May 1999 (experimental); 17 January 2001 (main launch)
- Former names: SFi (1999–2005); SF Replay; SF info (2005–2012)

Links
- Website: www.srf.ch/tv

Availability

Terrestrial
- DTT: ~~DVB-T~~ (only for German-speaking Switzerland; ceased on 3 June 2019)

SRF info is a German-language Swiss television channel owned by Schweizer Radio und Fernsehen. The channel started trial broadcasts in May 1999 and regular broadcasts in January 2001.

The channel was initially broadcast only via cable and satellite television, but it was also transmitted terrestrially in the German-speaking regions of Switzerland from January 2009 until the cessation of all digital terrestrial television signals across Switzerland on 3 June 2019.

== Programming ==
The main programmes on the channel come from Schweizer Radio und Fernsehen, which have already been aired on SRF 1 and SRF zwei.

During the evenings the channel rebroadcasts the daily news programmes SRF Tagesschau, 10vor10 and Schweiz aktuell.

The channel also rebroadcasts some programmes such as the World Economic Forum annual meeting in Davos.

In 2019, due to scheduling issues, SRF info broadcast the first semi-final of the Eurovision Song Contest 2019, instead of its sister channel SRF zwei.

== Logos and identities ==
Logo of SF I from 1999 to 2005

Logo of SF info from 2005 to 29 February 2012

Logo of SF info from 29 February to 16 December 2012

Logo of SRF info HD since March 2015
