= Schweiz aktuell =

- Genre: News; Current affairs
- Presented by: Sabine Dahinden Carrel; Oliver Bono; Michael Weinmann; Katharina Locher; Anna Maier
- Country of origin: Switzerland
- Original language: German

Production
- Running time: 25 minutes

Original release
- Network: SRF 1, SRF info
- Release: 1981 – present

Related
- 10vor10, DOK, SRF Tagesschau

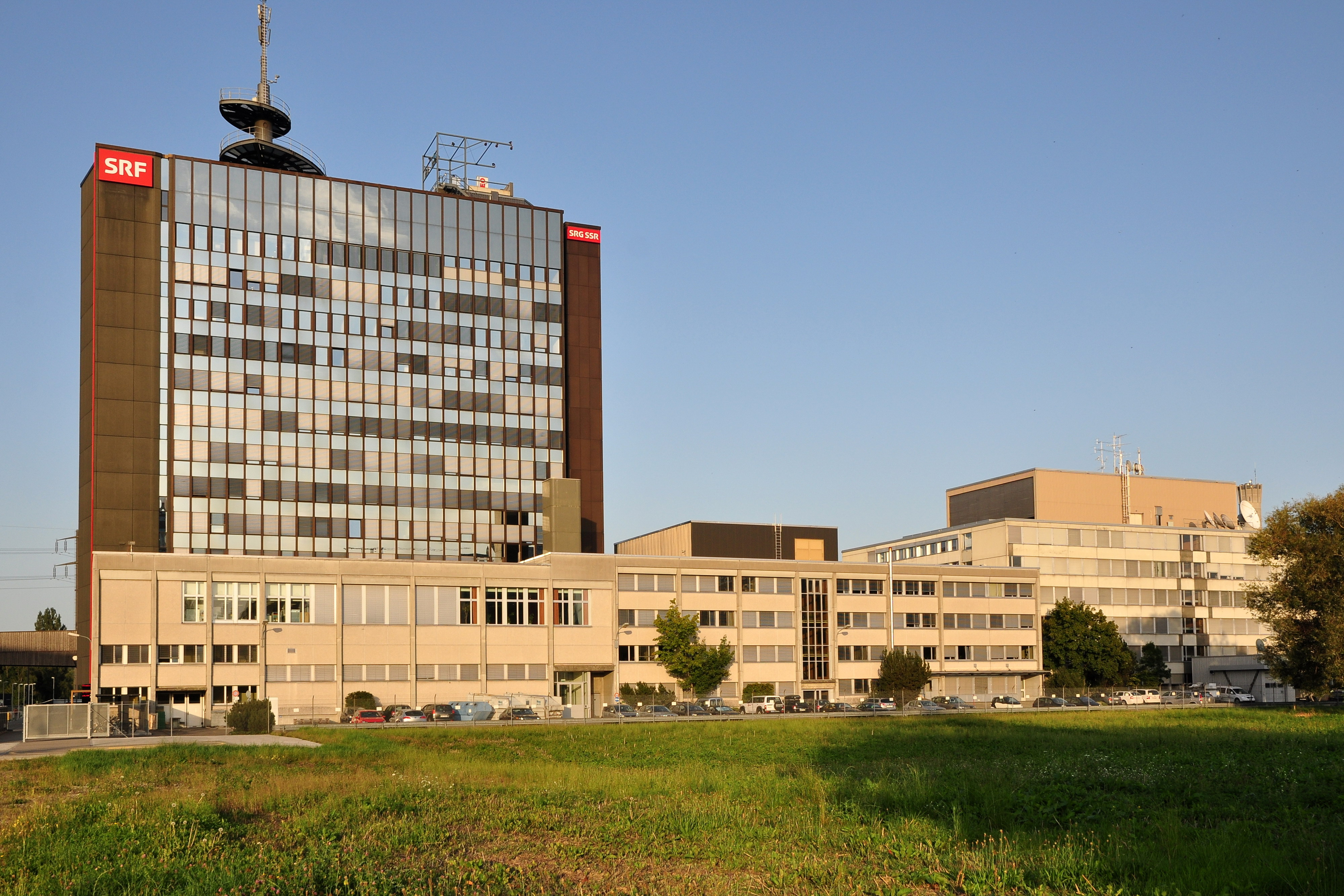
SRF studio Leutschenbach

Schweiz aktuell (literally "Switzerland Today") is the title of a current affairs show on German-language Swiss public television channel SRF 1. It started in 1981 as DRS aktuell, Schweiz aktuell.

== Background and contents ==
Schweiz aktuell reports on major cantonal, regional and local issues and events, covering all parts of the country. Editors consider regional diversity, i.e. regional news and stories that are significant and are of national interest. In addition to the usual news forms, the broadcast includes live reports and interviews, usually in Swiss German, with domestic correspondents.

Features are produced daily; for instance, in August 2014 a historical documentary series focussed on a fictional family and their weaving company, living in summer 1914 in the Tösstal valley. Another documentary depicted cadets' life in a Swiss police academy in October 2014, while another offered background information about the Wauwilermoos internment camp during World War II.

Only a few Swiss television programs of the national Schweizer Radio und Fernsehen SRF broadcast in Swiss German instead of the Swiss Standard German language, among them Schweiz aktuell, and partially 10vor10.
