= SRF zwei =

- Logo used since 2012

Programming
- Picture format: 720p HDTV (downscaled to 16:9 576i for the SDTV feed)

Ownership
- Owner: Schweizer Radio und Fernsehen
- Sister channels: SRF 1 SRF info

History
- Launched: 1 September 1997; 28 years ago
- Replaced: S Plus; Schweiz 4
- Former names: SF2 (1997–2005); SF zwei (2005–2012)

Links
- Website: www.srf.ch/tv

Availability

Terrestrial
- Digital terrestrial television: ~~DVB-T~~ (channel numbers varied with location; ceased on 3 June 2019)

SRF zwei (Swiss Radio and Television Two) is a Swiss German-language free-to-air television channel run under the public SRG SSR broadcasting group.

== History ==
The channel was launched in 1997 as 'SF 2' as the German-speaking replacement for the formerly nationwide second public channel S Plus (which originally launched in 1993 and was subsequently renamed Schweiz 4 in 1995). It is the second of the three national German-language channels in Switzerland (the others being SRF 1 and SRF info).

SF 2 was renamed to SF zwei on 5 December 2005, in order to differentiate it more from its sister channel SF 1. An HD version launched on 29 February 2012.

== Programming ==
SRF zwei mainly broadcasts programmes aimed towards a younger audience. There is a heavy emphasis on movies, TV series and sporting events, much like its Austrian equivalent ORF 1. Feature films and TV series are often broadcast with both the German dub and the original soundtrack.

From 1998 to 2003, a Nickelodeon-branded programming block was broadcast on SRF zwei (then known as SF 2) on weekdays between 10am and 5pm; there was a mixture of Nicktoons and Swiss productions, as well as live broadcasts featuring interactive games. In addition, a Junior-branded block was broadcast on weekend mornings; this was extended to weekdays from September 2003, replacing the Nickelodeon block. This too ended in December 2006, and was replaced by SF tubii, which was renamed Zambo in 2010.

On 29 February 2012, a major programme overhaul was undertaken: the children's block Zambo was shortened and moved to SRF 1, due to programming on SRF zwei regularly being interrupted for sports broadcasts. In addition, The Simpsons was removed from its early evening slot due to poor ratings, and was replaced with a series of in-house productions.

=== Broadcasts ===
- sport live: Live sporting events
- sport aktuell: Daily sports news magazine
- sportpanorama: Weekly in-depth sports magazine
- PresseTV: Various magazine programmes produced by print magazines
- Movies
- TV series

=== Entertainment ===
- Eurovision Choir
- Eurovision Song Contest
- Eurovision Young Musicians
- Junior Eurovision Song Contest

=== Series ===
- Arrested Development
- Babylon Berlin (2018–present)
- Boston Legal
- Breaking Bad
- Brooklyn Nine-Nine
- Castle
- Chicago Justice (2018–present)
- Chicago P.D. (2015–present)
- Code Black (2016)
- Crazy Ex-Girlfriend (2017)
- Der Lehrer (2010-2011)
- Desperate Housewives (2005-201?)
- Devious Maids (Devious Maids - Schmutzige Geheimnisse) (2014, 2017)
- Dexter
- Family Guy
- Fargo
- Friends
- Fringe (Fringe - Grenzfälle des FBI) (2009-2011, 2014)
- Glee (2011-201?)
- Grey's Anatomy (2006–present)
- Homeland
- Intelligence (2015–present)
- Last Man Standing (2014–present)
- Line of Duty (2017–present)
- Mad Men (2018–present)
- Madam Secretary (2015–present)
- Malcolm in the Middle
- Outlander
- Prime Suspect (Heißer Verdacht) (2006)
- Prison Break (2007-201?)
- Revenge (2012-2016, 2018–present)
- Sherlock
- Six Feet Under
- Station 19 (Seattle Firefighters - Die jungen Helden) (2018–present)
- Stalker (2015-2017)
- Tatort (2011–present)
- The Bugs Bunny Show (1997-2005?)
- The Catch (2017–present)
- The Fall (The Fall – Tod in Belfast) (2018–present)
- The Good Wife
- The Great Indoors (2018–present)
- The Grinder (2016-2017)
- The Guardian (The Guardian - Retter mit Herz) (2005, 2012-2016, 2018–present)
- The Sopranos
- The Tudors

=== Sport ===
- Credit Suisse Super League
- Schweizer Cup
- Swiss Internationals
- FIFA World Cup
- UEFA Euro
- UEFA Nations League (Switzerland matches only)
- UEFA Champions League
- UEFA Europa League
- UEFA Super Cup
- Davis Cup (Switzerland matches only)
- Fed Cup (Switzerland matches only)

== Logos and identities ==
SF 2 logo from 1997 to 2005

SF Zwei logo from 2005 to 29 February 2012

29 February to 16 December 2012

SF Zwei HD logo from 29 February to 16 December 2012

SF Zwei HD logo since 16 December 2012
