= 10vor10 =

Television program

- logo as of 2020
- Genre: News; Current affairs; Reportages
- Presented by: Daniela Lager; Arthur Honegger; Andrea Vetsch; Cornelia Bösch
- Country of origin: Switzerland
- Original languages: Swiss Standard German and partially Swiss German

Production
- Editor: Christian Dütschler
- Running time: 25 minutes

Original release
- Network: SRF 1, SRF info
- Release: August 20, 1990 – present

Related
- DOK, Schweiz aktuell, SRF Tagesschau

10vor10 (10 to 10) is a current affairs programme broadcast at 21.50 every Monday to Friday evening on the German-language Swiss public television channel SRF 1.

== Profile ==
According to Christian Dütschler, editorial director of 10vor10, "it is our goal to make competent and exciting posts and to provide discussion material for the public debate as a news magazine". Well-researched background stories, surprising approaches, and strong reports are the main content to provide those goals, as well focal points and series that shed light on a topic from different angles. Short posts are produced daily, focus on international and national stories. 10vor10 is broadcast widely in the Swiss Standard German language, excluded some interviews in Swiss German, and adjoints Schweiz aktuell, focussed on local themes.

== Broadcast ==
10vor10 started on 20 August 1990 and is broadcast from 21.50 to 22.15 from Monday to Friday, except on public holidays. All contributions are available shortly after the broadcast as a video stream. After the premiere on SRF 1, the program is repeated several times on SRF info, and on the Austrian–German–Swiss co-production television channel 3sat after midnight, where the interviews in Swiss German are subtitled in the high German language.

While the SRF daily news broadcast in concise form, 10vor10 focuses on detailed background reports, features and interviews. Stylistically, 10vor10 first reacted on Swiss television the concept of infotainment and operates a moderate form of investigative journalism. The journalistic use of the Swiss German language, in contrast to the evening news, mainly in direct conversation with interviewees, is a further 'trademark', but all moderations are done in German.

== Team ==
As of September 2015, 10vor10 is moderated alternately by Daniela Lager, Andrea Vetsch, Arthur Honegger (replaced Klapproth on 28 September 2015) and Cornelia Bösch (reserve), who usually alternate in moderation in a weekly rhythm. Stefan Klapproth joined the moderation team in 1994 and left the daily crew on 4 September 2015, but still moderates 10vor10 specials, and the cultural program Sternstunde Philosophie since January 2015.

Former moderators are Jana Caniga, Walter Eggenberger, Jürg Wildberger, Alenka Ambroz, Eva Wannemacher, Susanne Wille and Christine Maier.
