= SRF 1 =

- Logo used since 2012
- Country: Switzerland

Programming
- Language: German
- Picture format: 720p HDTV (downscaled to 576i for the SD feed)

Ownership
- Owner: Schweizer Radio und Fernsehen
- Sister channels: SRF zwei, SRF info

History
- Launched: 1 March 1953; 73 years ago
- Former names: SRG (1953–1958); TV DRS (1958–1984); Fernsehen DRS (1985–1990); Schweizer Fernsehen (1990–1993); SF DRS (1993–1997); SF 1 (1997–2012)

Links
- Website: www.srf.ch/tv

Availability

Terrestrial
- Digital: ~~DVB-T~~ (ceased on 3 June 2019 in Switzerland)
- Digital: DVB-T in South Tyrol (Italy) via Rundfunk Anstalt Südtirol

Streaming media
- Zattoo: https://zattoo.com/live/srf1 (Switzerland only)

SRF 1 (SRF eins) is a German-language Swiss television channel, one of three produced by the SRG SSR public-service broadcasting group (the others being SRF zwei and SRF info). The channel, formerly known as SF1, was renamed on 16 December 2012, together with its sister German-speaking TV channels and five radio channels, as part of an exercise aimed at emphasizing their common ownership as well as establishing a shared web presence for all of them.

The channel promotes itself as "a full-service TV station with a high proportion of home-produced content, especially documentaries and dramas" that offers "news and current affairs, education, arts, and entertainment for all", and it focuses on drama, entertainment, news and current affairs. Although SRF 1 is a German-language television channel, it is nevertheless largely balanced in its coverage of German and French news when it comes to foreign coverage.

== History ==
In 1993 Marco Fumasoli created the idents on Swiss themes with the new rectangular logo of the then SF DRS and with the music by Stephan Wittwer.

In June 2021, SRF 1 upgraded from HD (720p) to Full HD (1080p).

== Programming ==
=== Children ===
- The Adventures of Hello Kitty & Friends (Die Abenteuer von Hello Kitty & Friends)
- The Adventures of Paddington Bear (Die Abenteuer von Paddington Bär)
- The Adventures of Tintin (Tim und Struppi)
- Alfred J Kwak
- Archibald the Koala (Archibald der Detektiv)
- Arthur (Erdferkel Arthur und seine Freunde))
- Babar (Babar der Elefantenkönig)
- Barbapapa
- Bobobobs (Die Bobobobs)
- Bob the Builder (Bob der Baumeister)
- Bump in the Night (Bumpy Chaos in der Nacht)
- Caillou
- Calimero
- Canimals
- Captain Bluebear (Käpt’n Blaubär)
- Count Duckula (Graf Duckula)
- Grisu (Grisu, der kleine Drache)
- Hamtaro
- Hallo Spencer
- Jim Button and Luke the Engine Driver (Jim Knopf und Lukas der Lokomotivführer)
- The Legend of White Fang (Wolfsblut)
- Kid vs. Kat (Coop gegen Kat)
- Löwenzahn (Episode 398-401)
- Little Mole (Der kleine Maulwurf)
- The Moomin (Die Mumins)
- Minuscule
- Pat & Mat
- Pingu
- Postbote Pat (Season 3-5)
- Seabert (Die kleine Robbe Albert)
- Shaun the Sheep (Shaun das Schaf)
- Snorks (Die Schnorchels)
- Rupert (Rupert, der Bär)
- Thomas & Friends (Season 1-4), (Thomas und seine Freunde)
- Wallace and Gromit (Wallace und Gromit)
- The World of Peter Rabbit and Friends (Peter Hase und seine Freunde)
- The Wombles (Die Wombels)
- The Wonderful Adventures of Nils (Wunderbare Reise des kleinen Nils Holgersson mit den Wildgänsen)

=== Entertainment ===
- Eurovision Choir
- Eurovision Song Contest (final)

=== Information ===
- 10vor10
- Der Club
- DOK
- Einstein
- Eisbär, Affe & Co. (Episode 150)
- Kassensturz
- Leben live
- Literaturclub
- Puls
- Rundschau
- Panorama (9 July 2011)
- Schweiz aktuell
- SRF Tagesschau
- Zapp (19 December 2009)

=== Series ===
- Die Anstalt (Episode 50 and 51)
- Extra 3 (1990–present)
- Gomorrah (Gomorrha - Die Serie) (2017–present)
- heute-show (Episode 32)
- Jack Taylor (2015, 2017)
- Kesslers Expedition
- Line of Duty (2016)
- nuhr im Ersten (2009–present)
- Prime Suspect (Heißer Verdacht) (2007-2008, 2010)
- Tatort (2008–present)
- The Fall (The Fall – Tod in Belfast) (2016)
- The Guardian (The Guardian - Retter mit Herz) (2005)

=== Sport ===
- FIFA World Cup
- UEFA European Championship

=== Talk ===
- Aeschbacher
- Arena

== Logos and identities ==
Logo of SF DRS from 1993 to 2005

Logo of SF 1 from 1 September 1997 to 5 December 2005

Logo of SF 1 from 5 December 2005 to 29 February 2012

Logo of SF 1 from 29 February 2012 to 15 December 2012

Logo of the HD offshoot from 29 February 2012 to 15 December 2012

Logo of the HD offshoot from 16 December 2012
