= SRF Tagesschau =

German current affairs show

- Original language: German

Original release
- Network: SRF 1
- Release: 29 August 1953 – present

SRF Tagesschau (lit. "View on the Day"), simply titled Tagesschau until 4 December 2005, is the title of a current-affairs show on German-speaking Swiss public channel SRF 1. The main edition is broadcast at 19:30 (CET) and further editions are shown around noon and at the end of daily broadcasting. In 1990, another news show called 10vor10 ("10 to 10") was added, as well as Schweiz aktuell for regional information.
