= Our World (1967 TV program) =

First live international satellite audiovisual broadcast

- Title card
- Genre: TV special
- Created by: Aubrey Singer
- Written by: Antony Jay
- Opening theme: "Our World theme"
- Composer: Georges Delerue
- Country of origin: Various
- Original language: Various

Production
- Production location: Various
- Cinematography: Monochrome
- Running time: 2 hours

Original release
- Release: 25 June 1967

Our World was the first live multinational multi-satellite television production. National broadcasters from fourteen countries around the world, coordinated by the European Broadcasting Union (EBU), participated in the program. The two-hour event, which was broadcast on Sunday 25 June 1967 (Note: Monday 26 June 1967 in Australia and Japan.) in twenty-four countries, had an estimated audience of 400 to 700 million people, the largest television audience up to that date. Four communications satellites were used to provide worldwide coverage. This broadcast was a technological milestone in television broadcasting.

Creative artists, including opera singer Heather Harper, film director Franco Zeffirelli, conductor Leonard Bernstein, sculptor Alexander Calder and painter Joan Miró were invited to perform or appear in separate live segments, each of them produced by one of the participant broadcasters. The most famous segment is one from the United Kingdom starring the Beatles performing their song "All You Need Is Love" for the first time.

== Planning ==
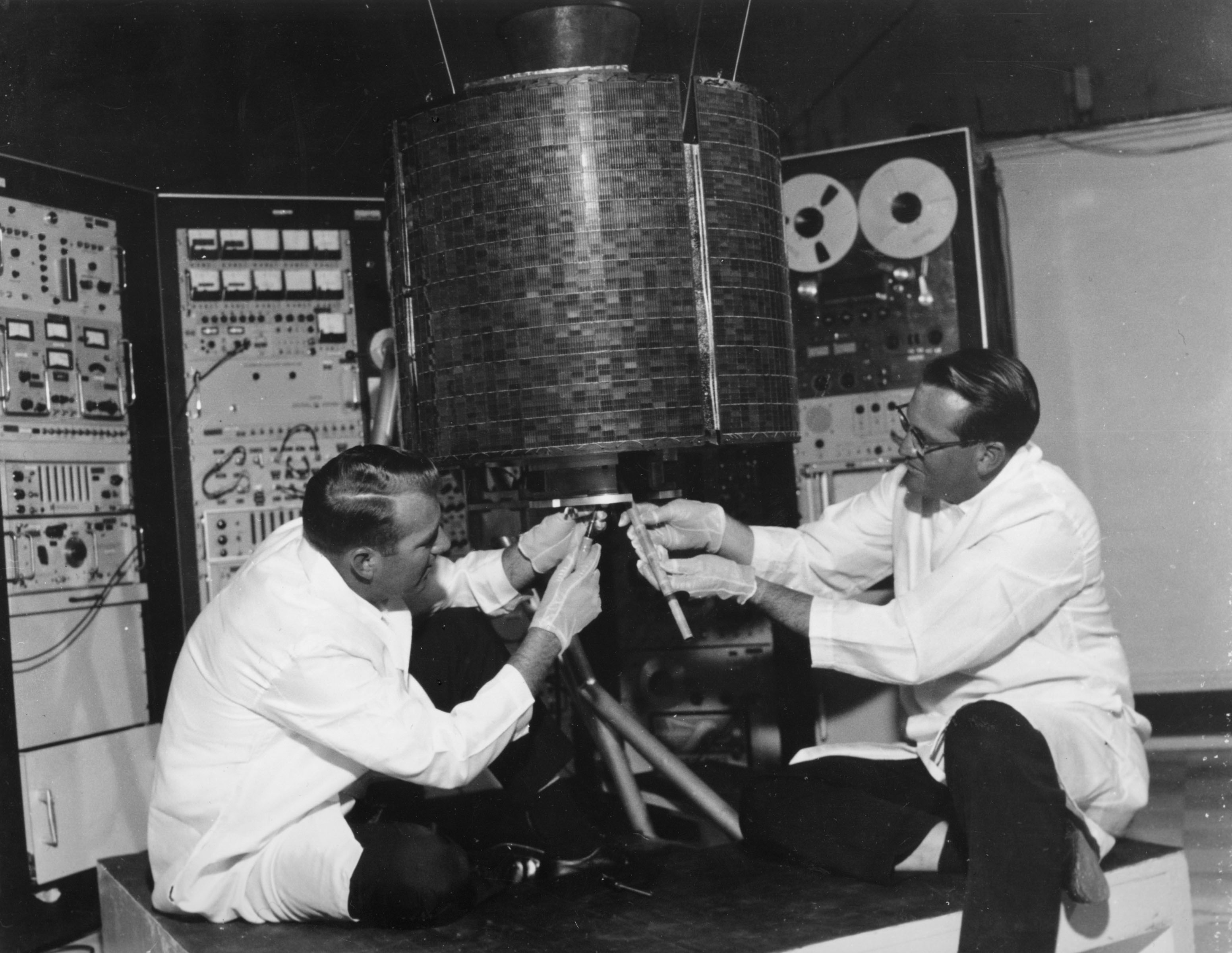
The Intelsat I nicknamed "Early Bird", one of the satellites used

The project was conceived by British Broadcasting Corporation (BBC) producer Aubrey Singer. Due to the magnitude of the production, its coordination was transferred to the European Broadcasting Union (EBU), with Singer as the project's head.

Four communications satellites were used to televise the show around the world. These geosynchronous orbit satellites included Intelsat I (known as "Early Bird") and Intelsat II F-3 ("Canary Bird"). Both satellites were positioned over different parts of the Atlantic Ocean. Intelsat II F-2 ("Lani Bird") and NASA's ATS-1 were positioned over different parts of the Pacific Ocean to complete global coverage.

Nine ground stations were utilized to send and receive signals from the satellites. (Note: The transmission used nine ground stations: Cooby Creek Tracking Station in Toowoomba, Australia; Jūō Ground Station in Ibaraki, Japan; Kashima Ground Station, in Ibaraki, Japan; Rosman Satellite Tracking Station in North Carolina, U.S.A.; Andover Earth Station in Maine, U.S.A.; Brewster Flat Earth Station in Washington, U.S.A.; Mill Village Earth Station in Nova Scotia, Canada; Goonhilly Satellite Earth Station in England, U.K.; and, Pleumeur-Bodou Ground Station in France.) The EBU's Eurovision point-to-point communications network was used within that continent. These signals were monitored and manipulated by technical and production teams in 43 control rooms that linked North America, Europe, Tunisia, Japan and Australia in real time.

The master control room for the broadcast was the TC1 studio control room at the BBC Television Centre in London. Contributions from North America, Japan and Australia were routed to London by the CBS Switching Center in New York. It was rented because none of the big-three American networks was directly involved with the broadcast. Contributions from continental Europe and Tunisia were routed to London by the EBU Centre in Brussels.

These centres were also in charge of distributing the live master feed from London to the broadcasters in their assigned area. To illustrate the introductory segments, a large set was built at BBC's TC1 studio, which was operated by the TC2 studio control room. To solve language issues, each receiving broadcaster had its own narrator – such as Cliff Michelmore at BBC, or James Dibble at ABC – reading in their own language the script written by Antony Jay. Since the contributions from the participating broadcasters were in their native language, a team of interpreters located at BBC's TC2 studio provided simultaneous translation into English, French and German to the receiving broadcasters, where local commentators voiced-over in their own language the original sound from other broadcasters when in another language.

It took 10 months and 10,000 technicians, producers and performers to bring everything together. The ground rules included that no politicians or heads of state could participate in the broadcast. In addition, everything had to be live, so no use of videotape or film was permitted. All participants had to have full knowledge of what was going to be included and the sole reason for including an item would be program balance, not geographical or political concerns.

In the dress rehearsal, conducted the day before broadcast, the head of the production noticed that in violation of one of the ground rules, the Mexican broadcaster had pre-recorded their main segment. They included singers, dancers and a flock of white doves taking off right on cue and attempted to pass it off as live. Replicating that scene for the actual broadcast was impossible. So, it was decided to show some of the performers watching their taped performance live on monitors.

== Participants ==
Fourteen national broadcasters participated in the program, which was transmitted live to 24 countries, with an estimated audience between 400 and 700 million people. Eighteen national broadcasters were intended to participate, but those of the Eastern Bloc countries (Note: One communications satellite in a nonsynchronous eccentric orbit –Molniya 1–, two ground stations –in Moscow and Vladivostok– and the International Radio and Television Organisation (OIRT)'s Intervision communications network were to be used additionally by the Eastern Bloc countries. Contributions from the Soviet Union were to be routed to Brussels by a Control Centre in Moscow while contributions from the remaining Eastern Bloc countries were to be routed to Brussels by the OIRT Centre in Prague.) – Czechoslovakia, East Germany, Hungary, Poland and the Soviet Union – pulled out four days before the broadcast in protest of the Western nations' response to the Six-Day War. Due to this withdrawal, a request was made to the Danish broadcaster, which was not originally a participant, for a contribution.

| Country | Broadcaster |
Participants
| Australia | Australian Broadcasting Commission (ABC) |
| Austria | Österreichischer Rundfunk-Fernsehen (ORF) |
| Canada | Canadian Broadcasting Corporation / Société Radio-Canada (CBC/SRC) |
| Denmark | Danmarks Radio (DR) |
| France | Office de Radiodiffusion Télévision Française (ORTF) |
| Italy | Radiotelevisione italiana (RAI) |
| Japan | Nippon Hōsō Kyōkai (NHK) |
| Mexico | Telesistema Mexicano (TSM) |
| Spain | Televisión Española (TVE) |
| Sweden | Sveriges Radio Televisionen (SRT) |
| Tunisia | Radiodiffusion-télévision tunisienne (RTT) |
| United Kingdom | British Broadcasting Corporation (BBC) |
| United States | National Educational Television (NET) |
| West Germany | Arbeitsgemeinschaft der öffentlich-rechtlichen Rundfunkanstalten der Bundesrepublik Deutschland (ARD) |
Non-participant broadcasters
| Belgium | Belgische Radio- en Televisieomroep (BRT) |
| Belgium | Radio-Télévision Belge (RTB) |
| Bulgaria | Bulgarian National Television (BNT) |
| Finland | Suomen Yleisradio (YLE) |
| Ireland | Radio Telefís Éireann (RTÉ) |
| Luxembourg | Compagnie Luxembourgeoise de Télédiffusion (CLT) |
| Monaco | Télé Monte-Carlo (TMC) |
| Netherlands | Nederlandse Televisie Stichting (NTS) |
| Norway | Norsk rikskringkasting (NRK) |
| Portugal | Radiotelevisão Portuguesa (RTP) |
| Switzerland | Swiss Broadcasting Corporation (SRG SSR) |
Withdrawn participants (Note: Withdrew four days before the broadcast in protest of the Western nations' response to the Six-Day War.)
| Czechoslovakia | Czechoslovak Television (ČST) |
| East Germany | Deutscher Fernsehfunk (DFF) |
| Hungary | Magyar Televízió (MTV) |
| Poland | Telewizja Polska (TVP) |
| Soviet Union | Soviet Central Television (CT USSR) |

== Broadcast ==
Each broadcaster had an explanatory pre-transmission introduction from their studios to their viewers – such as the introduction by Cliff Michelmore at BBC's TC5 studio in London for BBC1, the one by James Dibble at ABC's studio 23 in Sydney for ABC-TV and the interview to philosopher Marshall McLuhan at the television control room in Toronto for CBC Television – just before connecting to the live master feed from London at 7:00 p.m. GMT.

The program was divided into six sections: the Opening, This Moment's World, The Crowded World, Aspiration to Physical Excellence, Aspiration to Artistic Excellence and The World Beyond. These sections were divided into live segments provided by the participating broadcasters. Just before The Crowded World section, another section was scheduled – The Hungry World. But, due to the withdrawal of the Eastern Bloc countries' segments, that section was eventually removed and its remaining segments were incorporated into The Crowded World section.

=== Opening ===
The opening credits were accompanied by the "Our World theme" played by the Vienna Philharmonic and sung in seventeen different languages by the Vienna Boys' Choir. (Note: The opening theme originally contained twenty-two languages, but after the withdrawal of the Eastern Bloc countries, it was shortened to seventeen languages.)

The program began with an introduction from the BBC's TC1 studio in London and went on attending the births of four children in the delivery rooms at Hokkaido University Hospital in Sapporo, Japan; (Note: Segment provided by Nippon Hōsō Kyōkai (NHK).) at Aarhus University Hospital in Aarhus, Denmark; (Note: Segment provided by Danmarks Radio (DR).) at Hospital de Obstetricia III in Mexico City, Mexico –reported by Pedro Ferriz–; (Note: Segment provided by Telesistema Mexicano (TSM).) and, at Charles Camsell Hospital in Edmonton, Canada – reported by the CBC's Libbie Christensen. (Note: Segment provided by the Canadian Broadcasting Commission / Société Radio-Canada (CBC).)

=== This Moment's World ===
Back in BBC's TC1 studio in London, a journey around the world was begun by switching to Austria's national broadcaster Österreichischer Rundfunk-Fernsehen. They showed the United Austrian Iron and Steelworks in Linz. France was the next destination, aboard a Protection Civile helicopter flying over the returning weekend traffic at Porte de la Chapelle in Paris. It was reported by Office de Radiodiffusion Télévision Française's Joseph Pasteur. Next, it was off to the monuments in Medina, Tunis in Africa. This segment was provided by national broadcaster Radiodiffusion-télévision tunisienne (RTT). The program switched back to Europe aboard some fishing vessels sailing in the Gulf of Cádiz, Spain. Televisión Española showed fishermen at work and praising the country's fishing industry.

At 7:17 p.m. GMT, the show switched to Glassboro, New Jersey, in the United States (3:17 p.m. EDT local time). This was the location for the Glassboro Summit Conference between American president Lyndon Johnson and Soviet premier Alexei Kosygin. It was reported by National Educational Television's Dick McCutcheon who ended up talking about the impact of the new television technology on a global scale. Since no politician could be shown, only the exterior of the Hollybush Mansion – where the conference was being held – was televised. At 7:18 p.m. GMT it switched back to Canada, to the Two Rivers Ranch in Ghost Lake, Alberta, showing a rancher, and his cutting horse, cutting out a herd of cattle. It was reported by CBC's Bob Switzer. At 7:19 p.m. GMT it switched to Kitsilano Beach, in Vancouver's Point Grey area (12:19 p.m. PDT local time).

At 7:20 p.m. GMT, the program shifted continents to Asia. It was already 4:20 a.m. JST local time, the next day, in Tokyo, Japan. Japanese public broadcaster NHK showed workers building a section of the Tokyo subway system. The equator was crossed for the first time in the program when it switched to Australia at 5:22 a.m. AEST local time (7:22 p.m. GMT). This was the most technically complicated point in the broadcast, as both Japanese and Australian satellite ground stations had to reverse their actions: Kashima Ground Station in Japan had to go from transmit mode to receive mode, while Cooby Creek Tracking Station in Australia had to switch from receive to transmit mode. The segment from Melbourne dealt with trams leaving the South Melbourne tram depot. This was reported by Australian Broadcasting Corporation's Brian King as he explained that sunrise was many hours away since it was winter there.

=== The Crowded World ===
Back in BBC's TC1 studio in London, a section about human overpopulation was introduced starting at the Controlled Environment Research Laboratory (CERES). Next, the Commonwealth Scientific and Industrial Research Organisation (CSIRO)'s phytotron in Canberra, Australia, featured plant physiologist Lloyd Evans. He was carrying out experiments to extend the frequency of cereal crop cycles and was reported by Eric Hunter. Urban, maritime and rural scenes were shown from New York City; Ikushima shrimp farm in Takamatsu, Japan; a farm in Wisconsin, United States; Habitat 67 housing complex at Expo 67 in Montreal; and Cumbernauld, Scotland – as reported by Magnus Magnusson.

=== Aspiration to Physical Excellence ===
Back in BBC's TC1 studio in London, a section about people trying to achieve their best was introduced starting at Empire Pool in Vancouver, Canada, featuring swimmer Elaine Tanner trying to break the 110-yard butterfly World Record –reported by Ted Reynolds–, and continuing at the Equestrian Circle in Castellazzo di Bollate, Italy, featuring riders Piero D'Inzeo and Raimondo D'Inzeo –reported by Alberto Giubilo–; (Note: Segment provided by Radiotelevisione italiana (RAI).) at Söderfors, Sweden, featuring canoeists Gert Fredriksson, Gunnar Utterberg, Lars Andersson and Rolf Pettersson; (Note: Segment provided by Sveriges Radio Televisionen (SRT).) and, finishing at Calanque de Callelongue in Marseille, France aboard the maiden voyage of the Téléscaphe, the very first underwater cable car. (Note: Segment provided by the Office de Radiodiffusion Télévision Française (ORTF).)

=== Aspiration to Artistic Excellence ===
Back in BBC's TC1 studio in London, a section about people in pursuit of art was introduced starting at San Pietro church in Tuscania, Italy for the rehearsals of the film Romeo and Juliet, featuring film director Franco Zeffirelli and actors Milo O'Shea, Leonard Whiting and Olivia Hussey and continuing at Bayreuth Festspielhaus in Bayreuth, West Germany, for the Bayreuth Festival rehearsals of the opera Lohengrin featuring director Wolfgang Wagner, conductor Rudolf Kempe and singers Heather Harper and Grace Hoffman; (Note: Segment provided by Arbeitsgemeinschaft der öffentlich-rechtlichen Rundfunkanstalten der Bundesrepublik Deutschland (ARD).) at Fondation Maeght in Saint-Paul-de-Vence, France featuring sculptor Alexander Calder and painter Joan Miró; at Mexico City, Mexico featuring singers Antonio Aguilar singing "Allá en el Rancho Grande" on horseback and Flor Silvestre singing "Como México no hay dos" –reported by León Michel–; at the Lincoln Center in New York City featuring conductor Leonard Bernstein and pianist Van Cliburn rehearsing Rachmaninoff's Piano Concerto No. 3; (Note: Segment provided by National Educational Television (NET).) and, finishing at EMI Recording Studio 1 in Abbey Road, London, for the first recording session of "All You Need Is Love" by the Beatles, introduced by Steve Race. (Note: Segment provided by the British Broadcasting Corporation (BBC).)

=== The World Beyond ===
Back in BBC's TC1 studio in London, a section about outer space was introduced starting at Kennedy Space Center at Cape Kennedy in the United States, continuing at Parkes Observatory in Parkes, Australia, featuring John Gatenby Bolton tracking quasar 0237–23, the most distant known object in the universe at the time –reported by Kim Corcoran– (Note: Segment provided by the Australian Broadcasting Commission (ABC).) and finishing back in BBC's TC1 studio in London for a closing segment intercutting live footage from several of the locations already shown.

== Legacy ==
=== The Beatles' segment ===
The Beatles performing "All You Need Is Love" (colourised version from The Beatles Anthology)

As the broadcast took place at the height of the Vietnam War, the Beatles were asked to write a song with a positive message. They topped the event with their debut performance of "All You Need Is Love". They invited many of their friends to the event to create a festive atmosphere and to join in on the song's chorus. Among the friends were members of the Rolling Stones, Eric Clapton, Marianne Faithfull, Keith Moon and Graham Nash.

Although Our World was originally recorded and transmitted in black-and-white, for its use in the 1995 TV special The Beatles Anthology, the Beatles' performance on the program was colourised, using colour photographs taken at the event as a reference. The sequence opens in its original monochromatic format and rapidly morphs into full colour, conveying the brightly coloured flower power and psychedelic-style clothing worn by the Beatles and their guests that was popular during what was subsequently dubbed the "Summer of Love".

=== In literature ===
In the 2000 novel The Light of Other Days by Arthur C. Clarke and Stephen Baxter, the global media empire run by Hiram Patterson is called OurWorld, the name chosen after the character saw the program as a child and was inspired to change the world.

=== Exhibition ===
A permanent exhibition at London's Science Museum opened in 2018, telling the story of the transmission using footage from the show itself and video interviews with surviving members of the production team, recalling the technical challenges involved and the legacy created by the broadcast.

== See also ==
- List of the Beatles' live performances
- 2000 Today
