= Eurovision Young Dancers 1985 =

International youth dance competition

Date and venue
- Final: 16 June 1985
- Venue: Teatro Municipale; Reggio Emilia, Italy

Organisation
- Organiser: European Broadcasting Union (EBU)
- Executive supervisor: Frank Naef

Production
- Host broadcaster: Radiotelevisione Italiana (RAI)
- Director: Eros Macchi; Nevio Sivini
- Executive producer: Ilio Catani
- Presenters: Carla Fracci; Gheorghe Iancu

Participants
- Number of entries: 12
- Debuting countries: Belgium; Denmark; Finland; France; Italy; Netherlands; Norway; Spain; Sweden; Switzerland; United Kingdom; West Germany
- Participation map: frameless}} Participating countries

Vote
- Voting system: A professional jury chose the top 3 participants.
- Winning dancers: Spain; Arantxa Argüelles

Eurovision Young Dancers 1985 was the first edition of Eurovision Young Dancers, held on 16 June 1985 at Teatro Municipale in Reggio Emilia, Italy, and presented by Carla Fracci and Gheorghe Iancu. It was organised by the European Broadcasting Union (EBU) and host broadcaster Radiotelevisione Italiana (RAI). Dancers from twelve countries participated in the televised final.

The winner was Arantxa Argüelles from Spain, with Arne Fagerholt from Norway placing second, and Mia Stagh and Göran Svalberg from Sweden placing third.

== Location ==
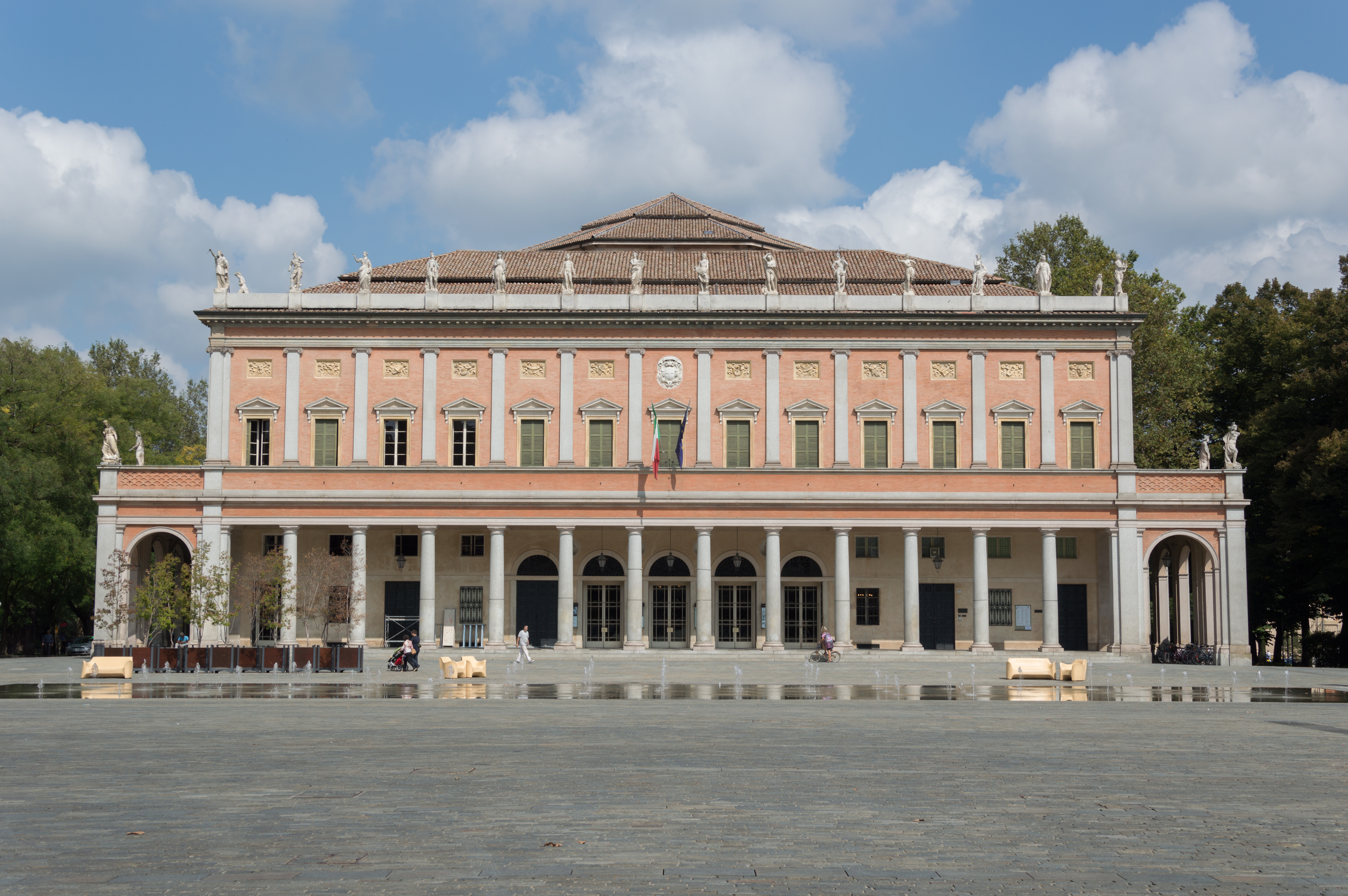
Municipal Theatre of Reggio Emilia

Teatro Municipale (also since the 1980s called the Teatro Municipale Valli due to being named after the actor Romolo Valli), a theatre in Reggio Emilia, Northern Italy was the host venue for the 1985 edition of Eurovision Young Dancers.

Following the destruction by fire of the 1741 Teatro Cittadella in April 1851, the new theatre was designed by the architect Cesare Costa and constructed in the neoclassic style between 1852 and 1857. Its inauguration took place on 21 April 1857 with the performance of the Vittor Pisani by local composer Achille Peri.

== Format ==
The format consists of dancers who are non-professional and between the ages of 16–21, competing in a performance of dance routines of their choice, which they have prepared in advance of the competition. All of the acts then take part in a choreographed group dance during 'Young Dancers Week'.

Jury members of a professional aspect and representing the elements of ballet, contemporary, and modern dancing styles, score each of the competing individual and group dance routines. The overall winner upon completion of the final dances is chosen by the professional jury members.

The interval act was a ballet performance from presenters repertoire.

== Participants and results ==
=== Final ===
Awards were given to the top three participants. The table below highlights these using gold, silver, and bronze. The placing results of the remaining participants is unknown and never made public by the European Broadcasting Union.

R/O	Country	Broadcaster	Dancer(s)	Result
1	Finland	YLE	Anneke Lönnroth	
2	Spain	TVE	Arantxa Argüelles	1
3	Belgium	BRT	Ariane van de Vyver and Ben Huys	
4	Norway	NRK	Arne Fagerholt	2
5	France	FR3	Christine Landault and Stephane Elizabe	
6	Netherlands	NOS	Jeanette den Blijker and Ruben Brugman	
7	United Kingdom	BBC	Maria Almeida (Note: Shortly before the contest, it was announced that Almeida would replace Viviana Durante.) and Errol Pickford	
8	Sweden	SVT	Mia Stagh and Göran Svalberg	3
9	Italy	RAI	Sabrina Vitangeli	
10	Germany	ZDF	Stefanie Eckhof	
11	Switzerland	SRG SSR	Xavier Ferla	
	Denmark	DR	Alexander Kølpin	

== Jury members ==
The jury members consisted of the following:

- Denmark – Peter Schaufuss (chairman)
- United Kingdom – Alicia Markova
- Italy – Paolo Bortoluzzi
- Monaco/Russia — Marika Besobrasova
- Brazil – Helba Nogueira
- France – Patrick Dupond
- France – Claire Motte
- Denmark – Kirsten Ralov
- Switzerland – Heinz Spoerli
- Italy – Vittorio Biagi
- Spain – Víctor Ullate
- Netherlands – Nils Christe

== Broadcasting ==
The 1985 Young Dancers competition was broadcast in at least twelve countries. It was also reportedly broadcast in the Soviet Union via Intervision. Known details on the broadcasts in each country, including the specific broadcasting stations and commentators are shown in the tables below.

Broadcasters in participating countries
Country	Broadcaster	Channel(s)	Commentator(s)	Ref(s)
Belgium	BRT	TV2	Fred Brouwers	
Denmark	DR	DR TV	Niels Karl Nielsen	
France	FR3 (Note: Delayed broadcast in a shortened format on 28 June at 23:05 CEST (21:05 UTC))			
Germany	ZDF (Note: Delayed broadcast in a shortened format on 17 June at 22:50 CEST (21:50 UTC))			
Italy	RAI	Rai Tre		
Netherlands	NOS	Nederland 2	Joop van Zijl	
Norway	NRK	NRK Fjernsynet (Note: Delayed broadcast on 22 June at 16:25 CEST (14:25 UTC))	Jannike M. Falk	
Spain	TVE	TVE 2		
Sweden	SVT	TV2	Niklas Lindblad	
Switzerland	SRG SSR	TSI		
Switzerland	SRG SSR	TSR (Note: Broadcast through a second audio programme on TSI)	Jean-Pierre Pastori	
Switzerland	SRG SSR	TV DRS		
United Kingdom	BBC	BBC2	Humphrey Burton and Annette Page	

Broadcasters and commentators in non-participating countries
Country	Broadcaster	Channel(s)	Commentator(s)	Ref.
Austria	ORF	FS2 (Note: Delayed broadcast in a shortened format on 18 August at 09:00 CEST)		
Portugal	RTP	RTP1 (Note: Delayed broadcast on 21 September at 18:15 WEST (17:15 UTC))		

== See also ==
- European Broadcasting Union
- Eurovision Song Contest 1985
- Eurovision Young Dancers
