= Televisión Española =

Spanish television broadcasting company

- Logo used since 2008
- Type: Television broadcaster
- Country: Spain
- Availability: Spain; Worldwide (international channels and online)
- Headquarters: Prado del Rey, Pozuelo de Alarcón, Madrid, Spain
- Parent: Radiotelevisión Española (RTVE)
- Test card: TVE test card
- Launch date: 28 October 1956; 70 years ago
- Digital channels: La 1; La 2; Teledeporte; 24 Horas; Clan
- Picture format: La 1 and La 2: 4K UHDTV and 1080i HDTV; Others: 1080i HDTV
- International channel(s): TVE Internacional; 24 Horas Internacional; Clan Internacional; Star TVE HD
- Webcast: Watch Live
- Official website: www.rtve.es

Televisión Española (acronym TVE, branded tve, lit. transl. "Spanish Television") is Spain's national state-owned public television broadcaster and the oldest regular television service in the country. It was also the first regular television service in Equatorial Guinea.

TVE began as a standalone company dependent on the Ministry of Information and Tourism. After undergoing several restructurings and reorganizations, it is since 1 January 2007 the television division of Radiotelevisión Española (RTVE), the public corporation that has the overall responsibility for the national broadcasting public services under a parliament-appointed president who, in addition to being answerable to a board of directors, reports to an all-party committee of the national parliament, as provided for in the Public Radio and Television Law of 2006.

TVE launched its first channel on 28 October 1956 as the first regular television service in Spain. It was the only one for a decade, until 15 November 1966, when TVE launched a second channel. As TVE held a monopoly on television broadcasting in the country, they were the only television channels until the first regional public television station was launched on 16 February 1983, when Euskal Telebista started broadcasting in the Basque Country. Commercial television was launched on 25 January 1990, when Antena 3 started broadcasting nationwide. On 20 July 1968, TVE also became the first regular television service in Equatorial Guinea, with the inauguration of its broadcasts in the then-Spanish autonomous region of Equatorial Guinea.

Its headquarters and main production centre is Prado del Rey in Pozuelo de Alarcón, with additional production centres in San Cugat del Vallés and in the Canary Islands. TVE's news services are located at its Torrespaña facilities, at the foot of the broadcasting tower in Madrid. Although almost all the programming of its channels is in Spanish and is the same for all of Spain, TVE has territorial centres in every autonomous community and produces and broadcasts some local programming in regional variations in each of them in the corresponding co-official language.

TVE's activities were previously financed by a combination of advertising revenue and subsidies from the national government, but since 1 January 2010, it has been supported by subsidies only.

== History ==
=== 1950s ===
Televisión Española was established at a building of Paseo de la Habana in Madrid, and after some time of technical tests, its free-to-air black-and-white fullscreen standard-definition monaural live analogue terrestrial television transmissions on VHF frequencies were officially launched on 28 October 1956 with a special inaugural program. The next day, three hours a day of regular live evening broadcasting began from its single 250 square metres (2,700 sq ft) studio, becoming the first regular television service in Spain. At that time, there were only 600 receivers in operation in the city and the coverage barely reached a radius of 70 kilometres (43 mi).

An initial news bulletin, called Últimas Noticias, was created within a week and a weather forecast was first aired on 2 November 1956. On 13 January 1957, the first fiction was produced, an adaptation of the 1916 one-act play Before Breakfast by American playwright Eugene O'Neill, and in February 1957, the first fiction series, the sitcom Los Tele-Rodríguez. On 15 September 1957, the evening edition of the flagship Telediario newscast was premiered, with the afternoon edition following on 28 April 1958.

On 27 April 1958, TVE aired its first live broadcast from out-of-studio, the 1957–58 La Liga season football match between Atlético Madrid and Real Madrid CF from the Metropolitano Stadium in Madrid. On 12 October 1958, the broadcasting centre in Zaragoza was inaugurated and on the first week of February 1959, the broadcasting centre in Barcelona began to operate. On 14 July 1959, the Miramar studios in Barcelona were opened.

=== 1960s ===
The first TVE production for abroad was the coverage for the European Broadcasting Union (EBU) of the arrival in Madrid of the President of the United States Dwight D. Eisenhower on 21 December 1959. As the link with the Eurovision telecommunications network was not ready yet, it was taped and sent by plane to the nearest Eurovision node in Marseille. Once the link was ready, the first live broadcast from Spain to abroad was the 1959–60 European Cup season football match between Real Madrid and OGC Nice from the Santiago Bernabéu Stadium in Madrid on 2 March 1960 through it. The first live broadcast from abroad to Spain was the second half of the European Cup final match between Real Madrid and Eintracht Frankfurt from Hampden Park in Glasgow on 18 May 1960 through Eurovision. The first full live coverage from abroad to Spain was the Wedding of Baudouin of Belgium and Fabiola de Mora y Aragón from Brussels on 15 December 1960, also through Eurovision. TVE took part in the Eurovision Song Contest for the first time in its 6th edition on 18 March 1961 in Cannes, with the song "Estando contigo" by Conchita Bautista.

Censorship in Francoist Spain was strict at TVE, which had an in-house committee of censors that supervised all programming. They were dedicated to hiding or prohibiting what they considered immoral and to preventing criticism of the regime. TVE news reports showed scenes of protests or riots that occurred elsewhere, but never those that occurred in Spain, and no footage of them was distributed through the Eurovision news exchange service either. The censors gradually lost power as the dictatorship weakened, and censorship was definitively abolished by law on 1 April 1977. As a child protection measure, since 1 May 1963, a content rating system was used, which displayed one rhombus at the beginning of programs not recommended for viewers under 14 and two rhombuses for programs not recommended for viewers under 18. This system outlasted the censors, remaining in use until 1984.

On 12 February 1964, the production centre in Las Palmas was opened to serve the Canary Islands. On 18 July 1964, Prado del Rey in Pozuelo de Alarcón was inaugurated to replace the facilities at Paseo de la Habana. It was opened with three studios already in operation and another six studios under construction. Studio 1 had an area of 1,200 square metres (13,000 sq ft), which made it the largest television studio in Europe at the time. Shows and fiction production was soon transferred there, but the news services were not transferred until 1967. In August 1966, the first permanent foreign correspondent was stationed in London, followed in 1968 by the ones in New York, Vienna, and Brussels. On 15 November 1966 its second channel was launched on UHF frequencies.

TVE participated in the production of Our World television special with thirteen other national broadcasters from around the world coordinated by the EBU. This was the first live multinational multi-satellite television production ever and it was transmitted to twenty-four countries, including Spain, on 25 June 1967. TVE contributed with a segment, live on board some fishing vessels sailing in the Gulf of Cádiz, showing the work of the fishermen and praising the country's fishing industry.

Televisión Española became also the first regular television service in Equatorial Guinea on 20 July 1968 when it inaugurated its production centre at Santa Isabel de Fernando Po, in the then-Spanish autonomous region of Equatorial Guinea, and began broadcasts. Since there was no television link with peninsular Spain, the programming consisted of programs made locally and programs received from Prado del Rey on tape. From its antenna located 3,011 metres (9,879 ft) above sea level atop Pico de Santa Isabel, the broadcasts reached the mainland province of Río Muni and the neighbouring countries of Nigeria, Cameroon, and Gabon. After the country declared independence on 12 October 1968, the new authorities accused it of broadcasting "racist programming" and "imperialist propaganda", and TVE ended up closing the station. Shortly afterward, it resumed its broadcasts as Televisión Nacional de Guinea Ecuatorial (TVGE) but ceased broadcasting definitively in 1973, and the few remaining Spanish technicians left the country. The Equatoguinean government re-established TVGE in 1979.

On 29 March 1969, TVE carried out the largest own-produced event until then, the 14h edition of the Eurovision Song Contest live from the Teatro Real in Madrid, following TVE's victory at the previous contest with the song "La, la, la" by Massiel. It was the second Eurovision Song Contest transmitted in full colour, and since TVE did not have the required colour equipment at the time, it had to rent it abroad. In Spain itself, the domestic broadcast and the copy that TVE kept in its archives was in black-and-white. The event was transmitted live to the EBU member broadcasters through the Eurovision network, to the International Radio and Television Organisation (OIRT) member broadcasters through the Intervision network and to broadcasters in Chile, Puerto Rico, and Brazil via satellite. TVE won this edition with "Vivo cantando" by Salomé, being the first time that a participant broadcaster wins twice in a row. This was a joint victory of four participants, because there was a tie for first place and the rules allowed more than one winner, and it is the last time that Spain has won the competition to date.

=== 1970s ===
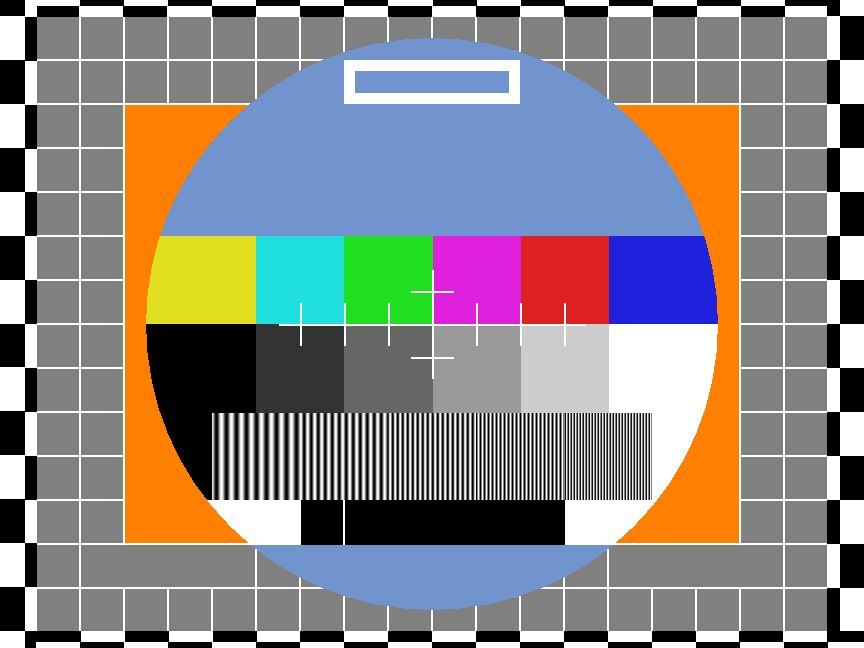
Colour TVE test card regularly broadcast since 1975 by La 1 until 1995 and by La 2 until 2001

TVE was a founding member of the Organización de Televisión Iberoamericana (OTI), which was established on 19 March 1971. It was also the bridge between the OTI and the EBU, and in addition to transmitting major events recorded by itself or received through Eurovision to the OTI member broadcasters in Ibero-America via satellite, and feeding those received from them to Eurovision, it conducted once every weekday the Servicio Iberoamericano de Noticias, the news exchange service between the OTI member broadcasters and the Eurovision news exchange service.

On 25 April 1971, the production centre in the Canary Islands, which until then had operated autonomously, began to broadcast to the archipelago the live signal of TVE's first channel received from Prado del Rey through the recently launched Intelsat IV F-2 satellite. Then, the coverage of the first channel reached almost all of Spain, but the second channel reached only the metropolitan areas of the main capitals. On 24 May 1971, the first delegation was opened in Bilbao, followed by the ones in Santiago de Compostela on 25 July 1971 and in Seville on 29 July 1971, which would later become the first territorial centres.

After two years of test transmissions, regular PAL colour transmissions started in August 1972, with the Summer Olympics in Munich; with all programming transmitted in colour by 1977, and all commercials in colour by 1978. A colour test card designed exclusively for TVE by Finn Hendil, under the supervision of Erik Helmer Nielsen from Philips, replaced its previous black-and-white card, developed by Eduardo Gavilán.

On 25 November 1972, TVE produced the very first edition of the annual OTI Festival live from the Palacio de Exposiciones y Congresos auditorium in Madrid. The event was transmitted live to the OTI member broadcasters via satellite. TVE also produced the sixth edition from the Centro Cultural de la Villa de Madrid on 12 November 1977, the 14th edition from Teatro Lope de Vega in Seville on 21 September 1985, and the 21st, 22nd, and 23rd editions from Teatro Principal in Valencia on 5 December 1992, 9 October 1993, and 14–15 October 1994 respectively. TVE won the competition six times: in 1976 with the song "Canta, cigarra" by María Ostiz, in 1981 with "Latino" by Francisco, in 1992 with "A dónde voy sin ti" by Francisco, in 1993 with "Enamorarse" by Ana Reverte, in 1995 with "Eres mi debilidad" by Marcos Llunas, and in 1996 with "Mis manos" by Anabel Russ.

Between 1977 and 1983, TVE produced the weekly variety show 300 millones with the support of OTI. The show was broadcast in Spain and transmitted to the Spanish-language OTI member broadcasters via satellite. TVE made extensive use of the communication satellites over the Atlantic, carrying out more satellite relays than any other television broadcaster in the world during the 1970s.

=== 1980s ===
On 23 February 1981, Televisión Española was recording the roll-call vote for the investiture of the country's next Prime Minister at the Congress of Deputies plenary hall when 200 armed Civil Guard officers broke into the building in a coup d'état. The assailants immediately disabled the television cameras by force, but a TVE operator, Pedro Francisco Martín, managed to continue transmitting from one of the four cameras without being noticed. Prado del Rey was receiving the transmission through an internal closed circuit, and half an hour of the incident was recorded. Fernando Castedo, General Director of RTVE, hid the tape with the footage inside his chair's cushion and sat on it when some military rebels took Prado del Rey for more than one hour. As soon as they had left, he sent two camera crews to the Palace of Zarzuela to record King Juan Carlos's speech repudiating the coup. Each crew returned to Prado del Rey with a copy of the speech in a different car and by different route, escorted by the Royal Guard, and it was broadcast as soon as they arrived. The footage of the assault inside the Congress was not aired until all of the deputies had released after the coup's failure the following day.

TVE was in charge of producing the official live television feed of the 1982 FIFA World Cup, which allowed it to carry out a major modernization with the construction of the Torrespaña broadcasting tower in Madrid and the production centre at its foot, which served as International Broadcast Centre during the event, both inaugurated on 7 June 1982. On 27 June 1983, a new production centre in Sant Cugat del Vallès replaced the Miramar studios in Barcelona. Also in 1983, the central news services moved to the Torrespaña production centre. Ever since 14 November, Telediario has been broadcast from there.

Between 1985 and 1999, TVE took part in the biannual Eurovision Young Dancers competition, being the most successful participant by winning with five of its eight entrants. TVE won the 1st edition on 16 June 1985 with Arantxa Argüelles, the 4th edition on 5 June 1991 with Amaya Iglesias, the 5th edition on 13–15 June 1993 with Zenaida Yanowsky, the 6th edition on 3–6 June 1995 with Jesús Pastor Sauquillo and Ruth Miró Salvador, and the 7th edition on 11–17 June 1997 with Antonio Carmena San José. Between 1988 and 2000, TVE participated in the biannual Eurovision Young Musicians competition but had poorer results since it qualified only for the final once, in 1992, with harmonicist Antonio Serrano, who finished second.

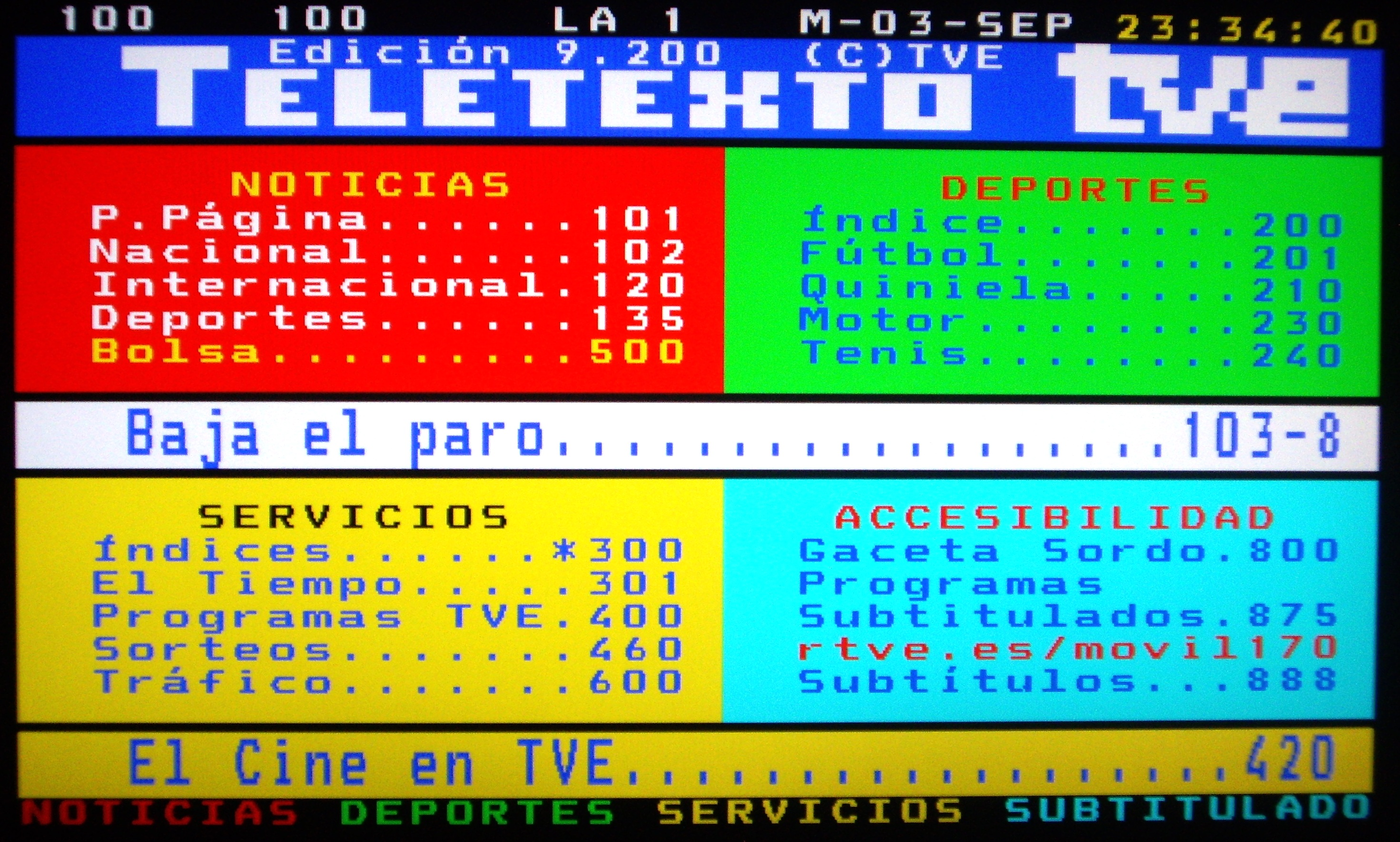
TVE teletext front page, on air since 16 May 1988

On 13 January 1986, weekdays breakfast television broadcasts began. On 16 May 1988, the teletext was incorporated to the broadcast signal, which allowed closed captioning to begin in November 1990. On 12 September 1988, TVE opened Estudios Buñuel in Madrid with three studios, one of them being the largest television studio in Europe at the time with an area of 2,500 square metres (27,000 sq ft), which were in operation until 30 July 2015.

TVE participated in the 19th, 21st, 22nd, and 23rd seasons of the international competition Jeux sans frontières with mixed teams from towns across the country. A team from Jaca won the 21st season in summer 1990, and a team from Seville was the runner-up of the 19th season in summer 1988. TVE hosted at the grounds of Prado del Rey the heats four and eight of the 19th season on 6 and 9 July 1988, and the heats three and eight of the 22nd season on 25 and 29 June 1991.

On 19 May 1989, in response to the European Economic Community (EEC) requirement to separate the natural monopoly of infrastructure management from the competitive operations of running services, and with the imminent arrival of commercial television, TVE's broadcasting network, including the Torrespaña tower, was transferred to Retevisión. While it was already appearing on certain live broadcasts as early as 1982, it was not until November 1989 that the logo bug appeared permanently at the bottom right corner of the screen on its both channels, except during commercials.

=== 1990s ===
For the Barcelona 1992 Summer Olympics the Organizing Committee created a host broadcaster expressly, Radio Televisión Olímpica '92 (RTO'92), in order to guarantee that the international signal was produced objectively and impartially. RTO'92 managed the staff and the production and technical resources hired to RTVE, the Corporació Catalana de Ràdio i Televisió (CCRTV), and the EBU. With a workforce of 3,083 people, 800 of whom were from TVE, and over 50 mobile units, 15 of which were from TVE, RTO'92 provided live coverage of all Summer Olympic sports for the first time other than a few preliminary events, as well as some 2,800 hours of live television footage, to its international rights-holders. Additionally, 500 TVE workers and eight mobile units were in charge of producing TVE's personalized coverage, with La 2 dedicating all its programming exclusively to the Games 24 hours a day. For Catalonia, TVE and Televisió de Catalunya (TVC) joined forces to broadcast the Games also in Catalan, creating the Canal Olímpic, a 24-hour channel in Catalan dedicated exclusively to the Games that occupied TVC's Canal 33 frequency.

The 1992 Olympics were also the first in which comprehensive coverage in high-definition television (HDTV) was attempted. The European HDTV broadcast of the Summer Olympics was managed by the joint venture "Barcelona 1250" created by RTO'92, RTVE, Retevisión, and PESA, with the financial support of the EEC and a workforce of over 300 production and technical staff. TVE was in charge of the planning and lay-out of the technical facilities, all the engineering and the provision of qualified personnel. A total of 225 hours and 45 minutes was broadcast in analogue HD-MAC standard in 1,250 lines and 16:9 aspect ratio, with commentary in five languages (Spanish, English, French, German and Italian) in addition to the non-commentary sound track, of eighteen different sports at seventeen venues, as well as the opening and closing ceremonies. Events from five venues were covered live, 80% of the total broadcast time, and other events were recorded for a delayed broadcast. On-screen text and graphics were shown in HDTV for the first time ever. Nearly 700 viewing sites installed throughout Europe, including the fifty HDTV receivers installed in various pavilions at the Seville Universal Exposition, were able to receive the broadcast.

On 1 December 1989 TVE international television service, on 12 February 1994 an all-sports channel and on 15 September 1997 an all-news channel were launched. In 1993, stereophonic sound and a sound multiplex for the original language in foreign productions began to be available in the broadcast signal.

=== 2000s to present ===
On 8 August 2008, regular test digital high-definition television transmissions started on TVE HD in 720p with the Summer Olympics in Beijing. On 1 January 2010, TVE dropped broadcasting commercial advertising on all its channels, with only self-promotions, institutional campaigns, and sponsorships allowed. With analogue service discontinued on 3 April 2010, all its terrestrial free-to-air channels have been available only through digital terrestrial television (DTT) ever since. On 31 December 2013, the first regular HDTV DTT channels were launched, simulcasting La 1 and Teledeporte, initially in 720p and later in 1080i.

TVE broadcast live the 2022 FIFA World Cup in ultra-high-definition (UHD), 4K resolution, HDR quality, and Dolby Atmos sound, free-to-air through the DTT on TVE UHD –a test channel on air since 2016–. It was the first UHD HDR broadcast of an event of that complexity and duration through the DTT ever.

On 16 November 2023, TelevisaUnivision co-produced with RTVE the 24th edition of the annual Latin Grammy Awards from the Conference and Exhibition Centre of Seville. It was the first time the awards were held outside the United States and were co-produced with a foreign broadcaster. TVE provided most of the technical resources and production staff, and broadcast it live in prime-time in Spain. Univision took charge of the direction and broadcast it in the United States tape-delayed in the corresponding prime-time of its East and West Coast feeds.

On 6 February 2024, the standard-definition (SD) versions of all its DTT channels were discontinued, and its first regular UHD DTT channel was launched, simulcasting La 1 in 4K. Due to technical problems, the actual shutdown of the SD channels and the relocation of the HD channels to make room for the regular UHD broadcast could not be done until 11 February. With this, TVE became the first-ever broadcaster to offer its main channel in UHD on free-to-air DTT covering its entire national territory.

On 16 November 2024, RTVE staged the 22nd edition of the Junior Eurovision Song Contest at the Caja Mágica in Madrid, after the previous contest's winner, France Télévisions, opted not to host, and Spain having been runner-up with "Loviu" by Sandra Valero. With TVE in charge of the television production, it was its first time holding the contest, just twenty years after its only victory with "Antes muerta que sencilla" by María Isabel in the 2nd edition on 20 November 2004.

On 6–12 June 2026, RTVE deployed one of its largest operations for the visit by Pope Leo XIV to Spain, with TVE in charge of the coordination and distribution of the official live television feed, as well as the production of some of the public events and its own coverage of all of them. RTVE deployed a workforce of 660 people, 400 of whom from TVE, 17 mobile units, and 170 cameras, for the seven-day visit to Madrid, Barcelona, and the Canary Islands. On 7 June, the Pope began one of his public journeys through Madrid at the TVE facilities in Torrespaña, arriving in an official car, boarding the popemobile parked there, and waving to the RTVE workers who greeted him.

=== Corporate identity ===
From October 1956 to March 1962

From March 1962 to September 1991.

From September 1991 to August 2008.

From August 2008 to present.

== Current television channels ==
Logo	Name	Description
	La 1	La uno (The one) since 2008, and formerly known as "Cadena I", "Primera Cadena", "Primer Programa", "TVE-1", or "La Primera" (The First). It is a generalist channel which mainly broadcasts news bulletins, news programmes, magazines, series, films, and some major sports competitions. It was launched on 28 October 1956 as the first regular television service in Spain.
	La 2	La dos (The two) since the 1990s, and formerly known as "UHF", "Cadena II", "Segunda Cadena", "Segundo Programa", or "TVE-2". It mainly broadcasts generalist and cultural programming, including quiz shows, news, documentaries, Spanish-language and European films, debates, and concerts. It was launched on 15 November 1966.
	La 2 Cat	It mainly broadcasts generalist programming for a Catalan-speaking audience. It was launched exclusively for viewers in Catalonia on 13th October 2025.
	Teledeporte	This channel broadcasts major local and international sporting events, as well as not-so-mainstream sports. It was launched on 12 February 1994.
	24 Horas	Canal 24 Horas is a 24-hour news channel. It broadcasts news reports, debates, analyses, interviews, and rolling news. It was launched on 15 September 1997 as the first 24-hour rolling television news service in Spain.
	Clan	Clan is a children's channel with programming for children aged from two to twelve during the morning and afternoon, and programming for older audiences during the evening and night. It broadcast reruns of TVE series during the early hours. It was launched on 12 December 2005, and was initially known as "Clan TVE".
	TVE Internacional	Televisión Española's international service. It was launched on 1 December 1989 and broadcasts TVE content worldwide.
	Star	Star is a pay television entertainment satellite channel broadcast in multichannel television providers in the Americas. It was launched on 18 January 2016.

La 1 and La 2 are free-to-air channels currently available in Spain through digital terrestrial television (DTT) in both UHDTV and HDTV versions. It broadcast in 4K resolution and Dolby Atmos sound for the UHDTV feed and in 1080i and Dolby Digital Plus for the HDTV feed. Teledeporte, 24 Horas, and Clan are also free-to-air channels currently available in Spain through DTT only in HDTV version in 1080i and Dolby Digital Plus. TVE Internacional, 24 Horas Internacional, and Clan Internacional are available abroad via satellite. Star TVE HD is a pay television channel that is available only in HDTV in multichannel television providers in the Americas. Channels are also available on streaming, and its content on demand, on the RTVE Play online platform.

== News services ==
Telediario is the flagship television newscast produced by TVE's news services at its Torrespaña facilities in Madrid. Three Telediario editions a day are produced: the breakfast edition at 06:30 CET/CEST, the afternoon edition at 15:00 and the evening edition at 21:00; and they are simulcast live on La 1, on 24 Horas news channel, on TVE Internacional and on RTVE Play. Additional international editions are also produced and aired on TVE Internacional every day. TVE's territorial centres in every autonomous community produce and broadcast a shorter midday local bulletin in regional variations on La 1 and RTVE Play. TVE's news services are also in charge of the 24-hour rolling news service of 24 Horas news channel and of the non-daily news programmes, such as Informe Semanal, of all its channels.

They were also in charge of La 2 Noticias ("The 2 News"), La 2's own national news bulletin, which began as an original nightly news bulletin in the late 1980s but it was turned into a breakfast news-programme in the mid-1990s and was later revamped as a nightly news bulletin, reverting to its original time slot at 22:00. In 2015, La 2 Noticias moved to a later time slot, 01:05, and it was eventually discontinued in 2020.
