= Intelsat II =

1966–1967 communications satellite series

- Manufacturer: Hughes
- Country of origin: United States
- Operator: Intelsat
- Applications: Communications

Specifications
- Bus: HS-303A
- Launch mass: 162 kilograms (357 lb)
- Power: 85 watts
- Equipment: 2 transponders
- Regime: Geostationary
- Design life: 3 years

Production
- Status: Retired
- Built: 4
- Launched: 4
- Retired: 4
- Maiden launch: Intelsat II F-1; 26 October 1966
- Last launch: Intelsat II F-4; 28 September 1967

Related spacecraft
- Derived from: Intelsat I

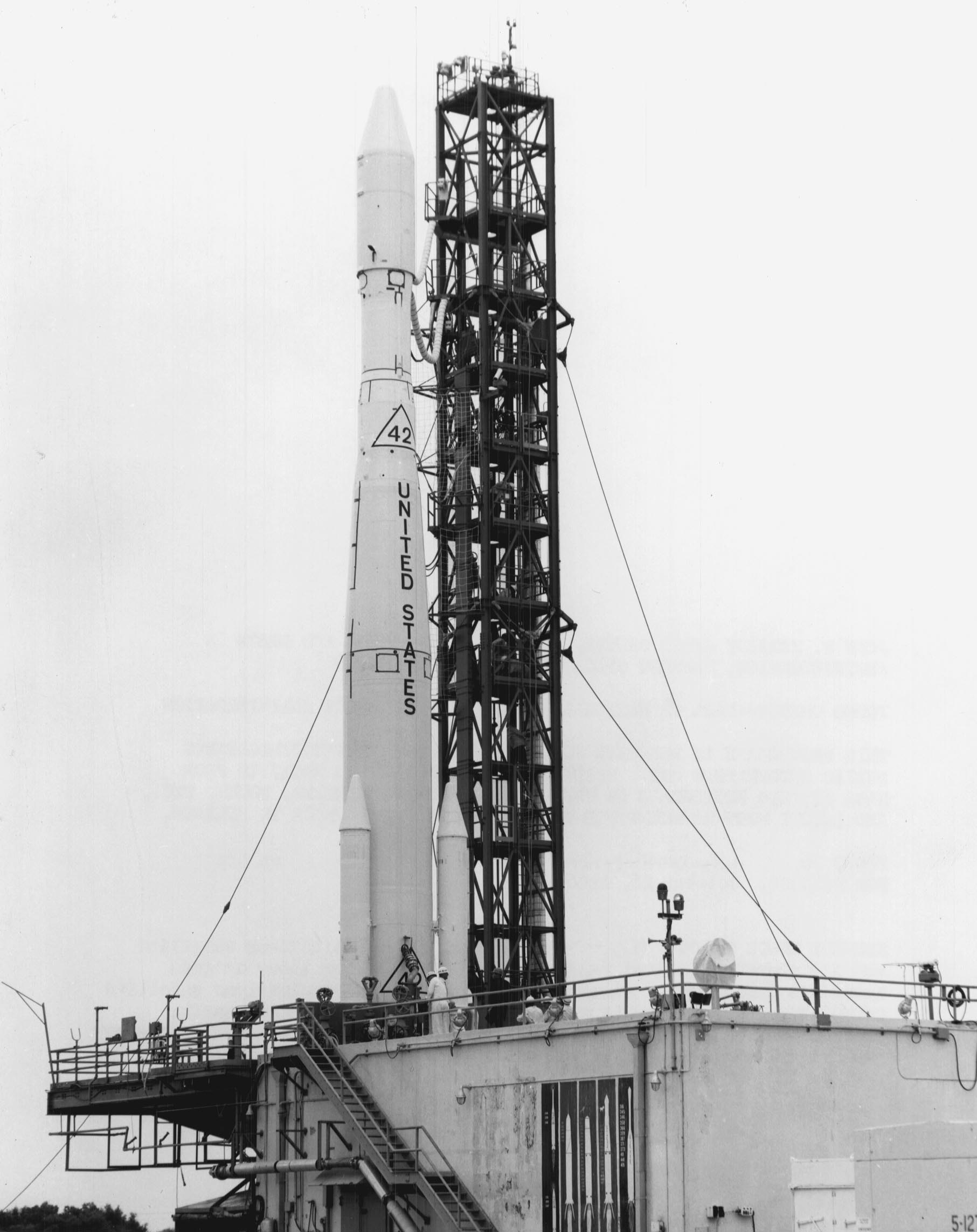
Intelsat II waiting launch

Intelsat II was a series of four communications satellites operated by Intelsat which were launched in 1966 and 1967. Built by the Hughes Aircraft Company, the Intelsat II series was a follow-up to the Intelsat I series, of which only one satellite was launched.

Intelsat II spacecraft were based on the HS-303A satellite bus, which was cylindrical in shape and spin-stabilised. The satellites had a diameter of 1.42 metres (4 ft 8 in), and were 0.67 metres (2 ft 2 in) long. They were equipped with an SVM-1 apogee motor to circularise their orbits following launch atop Delta E1 carrier rockets. All four satellites were launched from Launch Complex 17B at the Cape Kennedy Air Station. Each satellite had a mass at launch of 162 kilograms (357 lb), which decreased to around 86 kilograms (190 lb) once the satellite had fired its apogee motor and manoeuvred into its orbital position.

Intelsat II spacecraft were designed to be operated in geostationary orbit; however the first satellite's apogee motor malfunctioned leaving it in a lower than planned orbit. It was able to perform a limited communications mission, however the other three spacecraft successfully achieved geostationary orbit. Each satellite carried two transponders, powered by solar cells mounted on the body of the spacecraft, which generated 85 watts of power.

== Operations ==
Intelsat II F-1 provided a transpacific communications link for 240 telephone channels or two television channels. Provision was made for 180 hours of telecasting per year (an average of 30 minutes per day) via the satellite.

A 50-minute programme was relayed between Tokyo and Washington, D.C. via Intelsat II F-1 on 27 January 1967. It was the first newscast and the first colour programme to be telecast across the Pacific. Japan's Fuji Television used the satellite to present direct telecasts of the world featherweight boxing title match between Vicente Saldivar and Mitsunori Seki from Mexico City on 29 January. It was the first live transmission of a sport event across the Pacific. Stars and Stripes reported that the pictures were clear.

== Satellites ==
Spacecraft	Nickname	COSPAR ID	SATCAT	Launch date	Longitudes	Decommissioned	Remarks
Intelsat II F-1	Blue Bird	1966-096A	2514	26 October 1966 UTC	n/a		Apogee motor failure, limited operations from transfer orbit
Intelsat II F-2	Lani Bird	1967-001A	2639	11 January 1967 UTC	174° East (1967-1969)		
Intelsat II F-3	Canary Bird	1967-026A	2717	23 March 1967 UTC	15° West (1967-1971); 35° West (1972); 15° West (1973)		
Intelsat II F-4	Pacific-2	1967-094A	2969	28 September 1967 UTC	176° East (1967-1970); 166° West (1971)		
