= Téléscaphe =

Underwater cable way in France

Coordinates: 43°12′41″N 5°21′2″E

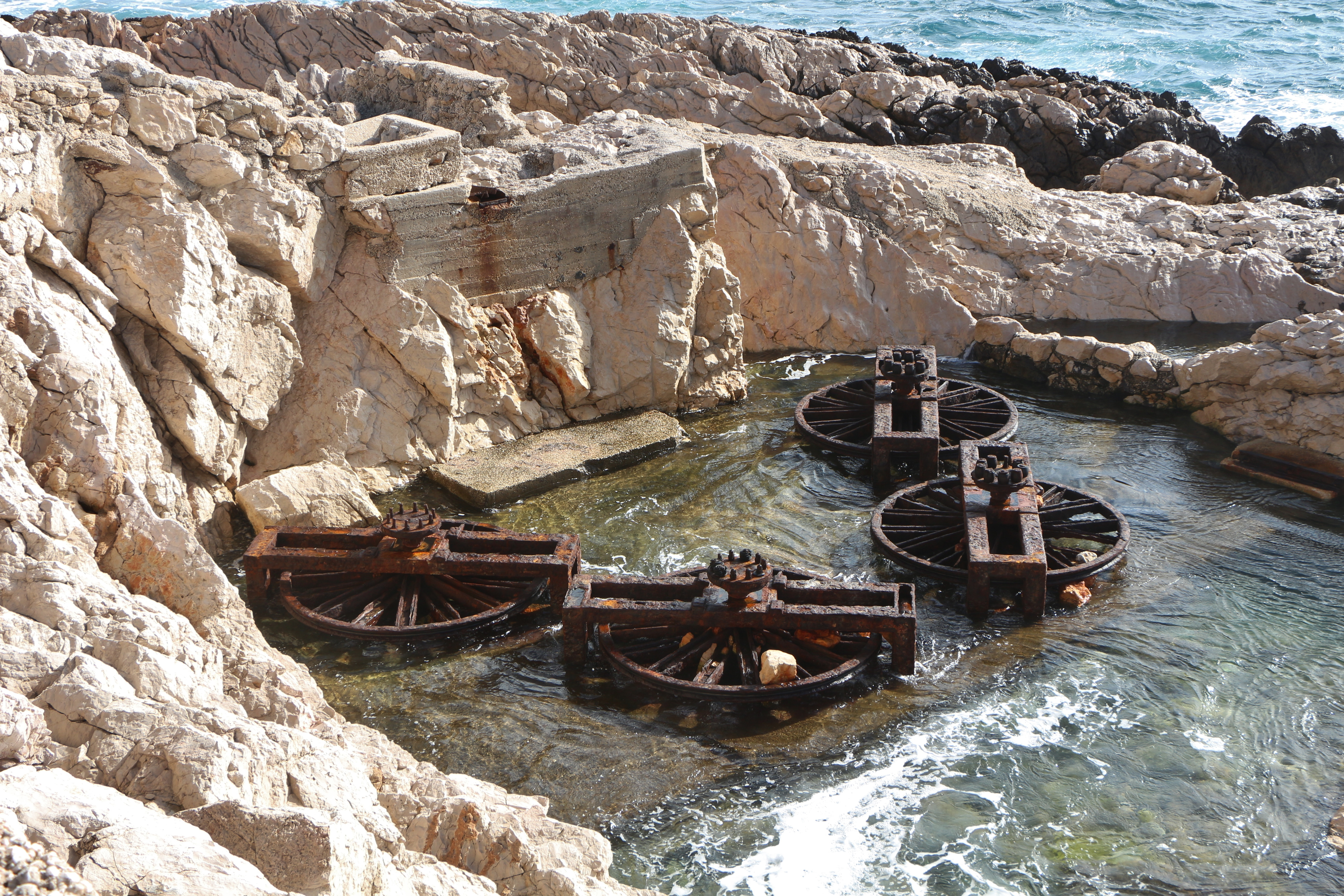

- Top: The remains of the Téléscaphe's pulleys. Bottom: The Téléscaphe in operation, showing two of four submarines.
- Locale: Les Goudes, Marseille, France
- Waterway: Passage de Croisettes
- Transit type: Cable submarines
- Began operation: June 1967
- Ended operation: 1968
- System length: 500 metres (1,600 ft)
- Travel time: 10 minutes

The Téléscaphe (a portmanteau of "téléphérique" (cable car) and "bathyscaphe") was an underwater cable way, situated near Les Goudes, Marseille, France.

In the early 1960s, ski lift engineer Denis Creissels and alpine skier James Couttet set out to design a system that would make visits to the seabed accessible to the general public.

With support from the City of Marseille and the École nationale des ponts et chaussées, construction began in 1966, and the attraction opened in June 1967.

The system consisted of four bell-shaped, six-seater submarines, each weighing around 3 tons and pulled by a cable. It could carry approximately 60 passengers per hour. A trip cost 12 francs, and safety was overseen by frogmen who monitored the operation. The submarines were fitted with lights, and could be operated at night. After each trip passengers received a certificate (a "baptême de plongée" or “diving baptism”) commemorating their first dive.

One of the submarines underwater accompanied by a frogman

The Téléscaphe ran between Callelongue and Cap Croisette at a depth of 10 metres (33 ft) over a distance of 500 metres (1,600 ft). Its maiden voyage was featured in Our World, the first live multinational multi-satellite television production.

The Téléscaphe proved popular with over 31,000 people but only operated for one season, closing in 1967 due to lack of money and support, as well as high operational and maintenance costs. In addition, there was an incident where a submarine ended up on its side and its three occupants had to swim to safety. The entire project cost over 2 million francs.

The system was later dismantled, although some of the shoreline bull wheels remain in place to this day.
