= Intelsat II F-4 =

Geostationary communications satellite

- Mission type: Communications
- Operator: Intelsat
- COSPAR ID: 1967-094A
- SATCAT no.: 2969
- Mission duration: 3 years planned 3 1/2 years achieved

Spacecraft properties
- Spacecraft type: Intelsat II
- Bus: HS-303A
- Manufacturer: Hughes
- Launch mass: 162 kilograms (357 lb)
- BOL mass: 86 kilograms (190 lb)
- Power: 85 watts

Start of mission
- Launch date: September 28, 1967, 00:45:00 UTC
- Rocket: Delta E1
- Launch site: Cape Canaveral LC-17B
- Contractor: NASA

End of mission
- Deactivated: c. 1971

Orbital parameters
- Reference system: Geocentric
- Regime: Geosynchronous
- Longitude: 176° east (1967-70); 166° west (1971)
- Perigee altitude: 35,742 kilometers (22,209 mi)
- Apogee altitude: 35,886 kilometers (22,299 mi)
- Inclination: 6.00 degrees
- Period: 23.95 hours
- Epoch: February 8, 2014, 07:56:55 UTC

Intelsat II F-4 was a communications satellite operated by Intelsat. Launched in 1967 it was operated in geostationary orbit at a longitude of 176 degrees east and later 166 degrees west.

The fourth and last Intelsat II satellite to be launched, Intelsat II F-4 was built by Hughes Aircraft around the HS-303A satellite bus. It carried two transponders, which were powered by body-mounted solar cells generating 85 watts of power. The spacecraft had a mass of 162 kilograms (357 lb) at launch, decreasing through expenditure of propellant to 86 kilograms (190 lb) by the beginning of its operational life.

Intelsat II F-4 was launched atop a Delta E1 rocket flying from Launch Complex 17B at the Cape Canaveral Air Force Station. The launch took place at 00:45:00 UTC on September 28, 1967, with the spacecraft entering a geosynchronous transfer orbit. It fired an SVM-1 apogee motor to place itself into its operational geostationary orbit. The spacecraft was operated at a longitude of 176° east until 1970, before being moved to 166° west. In total the satellite remained in service for around three and a half years.

As of February 8, 2014 the derelict Intelsat II F-4 was in an orbit with a perigee of 35,742 kilometers (22,209 mi), an apogee of 35,886 kilometers (22,299 mi), inclination of 6.00 degrees and an orbital period of 23.95 hours.
