= Alexander Kølpin =

Alexander Kølpin may refer to:

- Alexander Kølpin (surgeon) (1731-1801), surgeon
- Alexander Kølpin (ballet dancer) (born 1965), hotel owner and former ballet dancer
