= Intelsat II F-1 =

Communications satellite

- Mission type: Communications
- Operator: Intelsat
- COSPAR ID: 1966-096A
- SATCAT no.: 2514
- Mission duration: 3 years planned

Spacecraft properties
- Spacecraft type: Intelsat II
- Bus: HS-303A
- Manufacturer: Hughes
- Launch mass: 162 kilograms (357 lb)
- BOL mass: 86 kilograms (190 lb) planned
- Power: 85 watts

Start of mission
- Launch date: October 26, 1966, 23:05:00 UTC
- Rocket: Delta E1
- Launch site: Cape Canaveral LC-17B

Orbital parameters
- Reference system: Geocentric
- Regime: Geostationary planned Transfer achieved
- Perigee altitude: 3,265 kilometers (2,029 mi)
- Apogee altitude: 37,121 kilometers (23,066 mi)
- Inclination: 17.70 degrees
- Period: 718.41 minutes
- Epoch: February 1, 2014, 22:57:43 UTC

Intelsat II F-1, also known as Blue Bird, was a communications satellite operated by Intelsat. Launched in 1966 it was intended for operations in geostationary orbit over the Pacific Ocean to provide a communications link between Australia and the United States, however a malfunction prevented the satellite from reaching its planned orbit.

The first of four Intelsat II satellites to be launched, Intelsat II F-1 was built by Hughes Aircraft around the HS-303A satellite bus. It carried two transponders, which were powered by body-mounted solar cells generating 85 watts of power.

Intelsat II F-1 was launched atop a Delta E1 rocket flying from Launch Complex 17B at the Cape Canaveral Air Force Station. The launch, which was successful, took place at 23:05:00 UTC on October 26, 1966, with the spacecraft entering a geosynchronous transfer orbit as planned. The spacecraft was equipped with an SVM-1 apogee motor, which was to be fired to raise the spacecraft into its operational geostationary orbit, however this failed four seconds after ignition. The spacecraft was left in its transfer orbit, unable to complete its primary mission, however it was used for some tests and limited communications.

Intelsat II F-1 remains in orbit. As of 2 May 2023 it was in an orbit with a perigee of 3,265 kilometers (2,029 mi), an apogee of 37,121 kilometers (23,066 mi), inclination of 17.70 degrees and an orbital period of 11.97 hours.
