= Intelsat II F-2 =

Communications satellite

- Mission type: Communications
- Operator: Intelsat
- COSPAR ID: 1967-001A
- SATCAT no.: 2639
- Mission duration: 3 years

Spacecraft properties
- Spacecraft type: Intelsat II
- Bus: HS-303A
- Manufacturer: Hughes
- Launch mass: 162 kilograms (357 lb)
- BOL mass: 86 kilograms (190 lb)
- Power: 85 watts

Start of mission
- Launch date: January 11, 1967, 10:55:00 UTC
- Rocket: Delta E1
- Launch site: Cape Canaveral LC-17B

End of mission
- Deactivated: c.1969

Orbital parameters
- Reference system: Geocentric
- Regime: Geosynchronous
- Longitude: 174° east
- Perigee altitude: 35,748 kilometers (22,213 mi)
- Apogee altitude: 35,845 kilometers (22,273 mi)
- Inclination: 6.80 degrees
- Period: 23.93 hours
- Epoch: February 4, 2014, 11:35:30 UTC

Intelsat II F-2, also known as Lani Bird, was a communications satellite operated by Intelsat. Launched in 1967, it was operated in geostationary orbit at a longitude of 174 degrees east until 1969.

The second of four Intelsat II satellites to be launched, Intelsat II F-2 was built by Hughes Aircraft around the HS-303A satellite bus. It carried two transponders, which were powered by body-mounted solar cells generating 85 watts of power. The spacecraft had a mass of 162 kilograms (357 lb) at launch, decreasing to 86 kilograms (190 lb) by the beginning of its operational life.

Intelsat II F-2 was launched atop a Delta E1 rocket flying from Launch Complex 17B at the Cape Canaveral Air Force Station. The launch took place at 10:55:00 on January 11, 1967, with the spacecraft entering a geosynchronous transfer orbit. It fired an SVM-1 apogee motor to place itself into its operational geostationary orbit, arriving on-station at 174° East on February 4, 1967. The satellite achieved around two years of operation at that slot before failing in 1969.

As of February 4, 2014, Intelsat II F-2 was in an orbit with a perigee of 35,748 kilometers (22,213 mi), an apogee of 35,845 kilometers (22,273 mi), inclination of 6.80 degrees and an orbital period of 23.93 hours.
