= Molniya 1 =

First Soviet communications satellite

Molniya-1
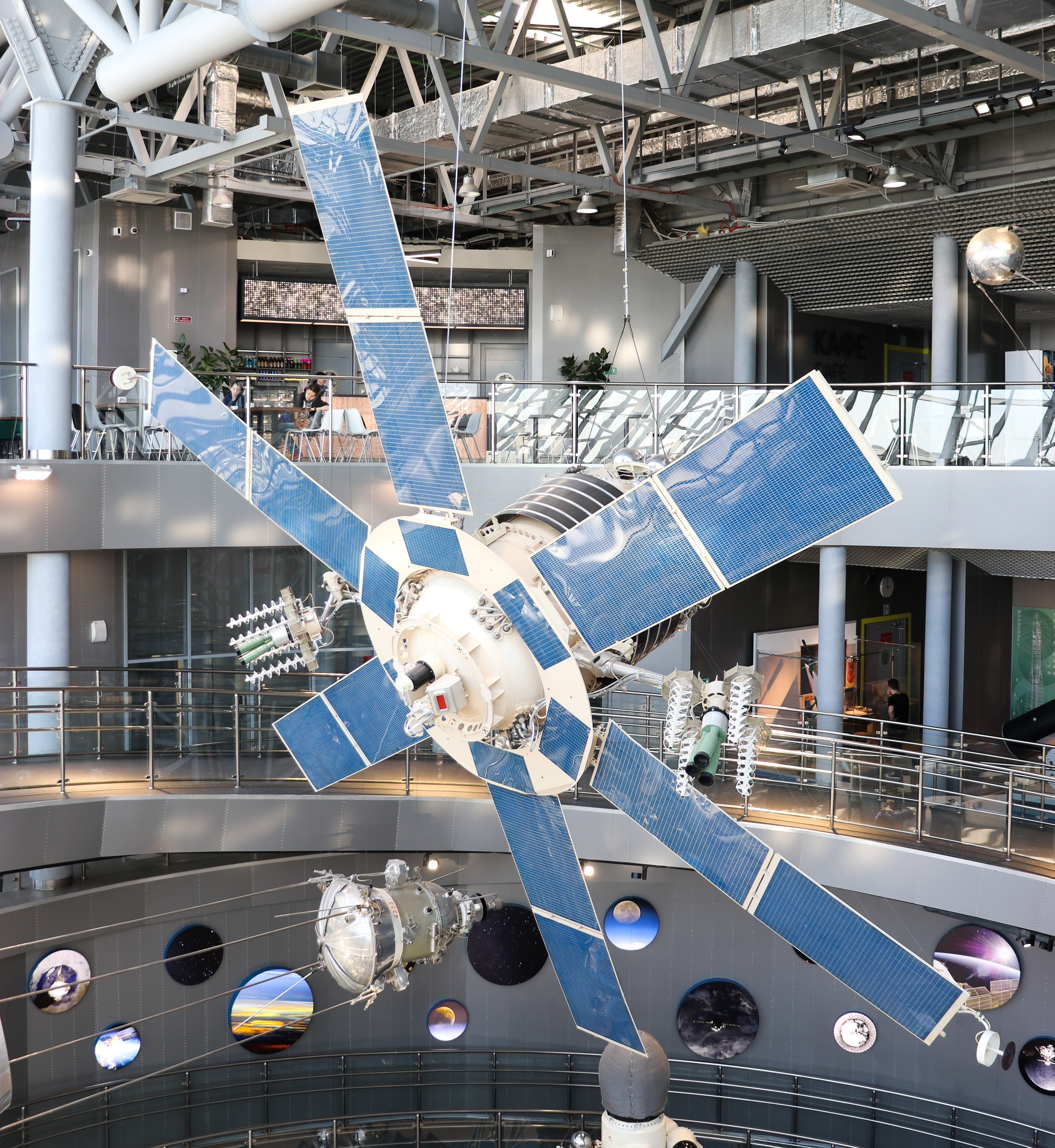
- Molniya-1, 1:1 model in the Tsiolkovsky State Museum of the History of Cosmonautics
- Manufacturer: OKB-1
- Country of origin: Soviet Union
- Applications: Communications satellite

Production
- Status: Active
- Launched: 7
- Maiden launch: 4 June 1964 (fail) 23 April 1965 (success)
- Last launch: 20 October 1966

Molniya 1 (Russian: Молния-1) is the first Soviet communications satellite. A total of 5 experimental devices were launched to create a long-distance radio communication line between Moscow and Vladivostok. Later, a series of Soviet and later Russian communications satellites were developed on the basis of the Molniya-1 spacecraft: Molniya-1+ (1967), Molniya-2 (1971), Molniya-3 (1974), Molniya-1T (1983), Molniya-3K (2001). These devices solved the problem of providing long-distance telephone and telegraph communications to remote areas of the Russian Far North, Siberia and the Russian Far East and retransmitting Soviet Central Television channels. For the first time, a digital communication system was used as a means of communication with the satellite. Since 2006, the Molniya satellites have been replaced by more advanced Meridian devices.

== History ==
Work on the creation of the satellite began in the Korolev OKB-1 design bureau in 1961 in cooperation with specialists from other design bureaus and institutes. The chief designer of the Molniya-1 space communication system projects (1962), as well as the subsequent Molniya-2 (1965), Korund (1969), and Kulon (1973), was the Deputy Director General for Science at MNIIS, Murad Rashidovich Kaplanov.

The initial goal was to create an experimental long-distance radio communication line between Moscow and Vladivostok using Molniya-1. At the same time, it was planned to create an operational radio communication system throughout the Soviet Union and with countries in the northern hemisphere based on Molniya-1 communication satellites in the future. Such a system, combined with local radio relay lines, could ensure the transmission of television programs from the Central Television to all major regions of the USSR.

The first launch attempt was made at the Baikonur Cosmodrome on June 4, 1964. Due to an accident in the second stage of the Molniya launch vehicle, the satellite with serial number 2 was lost 287 seconds into the flight. The cause of the accident was a failure of the Block A emptying system, which led to premature depletion of the fuel (kerosene). Without fuel, the turbopump unit went into overdrive, starting to increase its speed beyond the prescribed limit, then the automation issued a command for an emergency shutdown of the propulsion system.

The next launch was partially successful - on August 22, 1964, the satellite was launched into orbit as scheduled, but both redundant parabolic antennas did not fully deploy, which excluded its use for its intended purpose. When analyzing the causes of the failure, it was found that during the tests, the insulation of the cables leading to the antenna rod was damaged. This was due to the fact that, according to the instructions of the product designer, the cables were additionally wrapped with polyvinyl chloride tape; no full-scale tests were carried out after this modification. Polyvinyl chloride lost its elasticity at low temperatures and cracked when the antennas were deployed. In the official press, Molniya-1 No. 1 was called Kosmos-41; it existed in orbit for nine months, during which time all systems were tested except for the relay system. There were no other failures, except for the failure of the antennas to deploy.

The first successful launch took place on April 23, 1965. Molniya 1 No. 3 was successfully launched into orbit, but it was only possible to turn on the relay after several unsuccessful attempts; the cause was apparently oxidation of the relay contacts in the power supply circuits of the relay or the ingress of a foreign particle into them[3]. Thanks to the work of this satellite, residents of the Far East had the opportunity to watch the May Day military parade of 1965, which took place in Moscow, in real time for the first time. On 30 May the television camera on board Molniya 1 No. 3 captured a full-disk image of the Earth, the first time this had been done.

A common problem for the first Molniya-1 series devices was the rapid drop in power taken from the photoelectric converter panels. The reason was the poorly understood influence of the Earth's radiation belts at that time, as well as thermal cycling (at each revolution, the temperature of the solar battery elements changes sharply from +120 °C in the illuminated part of the trajectory to -180 °C in the shade).

A total of 7 Molniya-1 satellites were launched, 5 of them successfully. In 1966, due to the heavy workload of OKB-1, the production of the Molniya-1 satellite was transferred to Branch No. 2 of OKB-1, nowadays Information Satellite Systems Reshetnev, and all subsequent satellites of the Molniya series were manufactured at this enterprise.

== Purpose ==
The Molniya-1 satellites were intended primarily to create an experimental long-distance radio communication line between Moscow and Vladivostok. Later, the improved Molniya-1+ and Molniya-2 satellites were used to provide telephone and telegraph communications on the territory of the USSR, as well as to transmit Soviet Central Television channels to 20 ground stations with 12-meter antennas (the Orbita system). Thanks to Orbita, by the beginning of 1968, the number of Central Television viewers had grown by 20 million people

== Platform ==
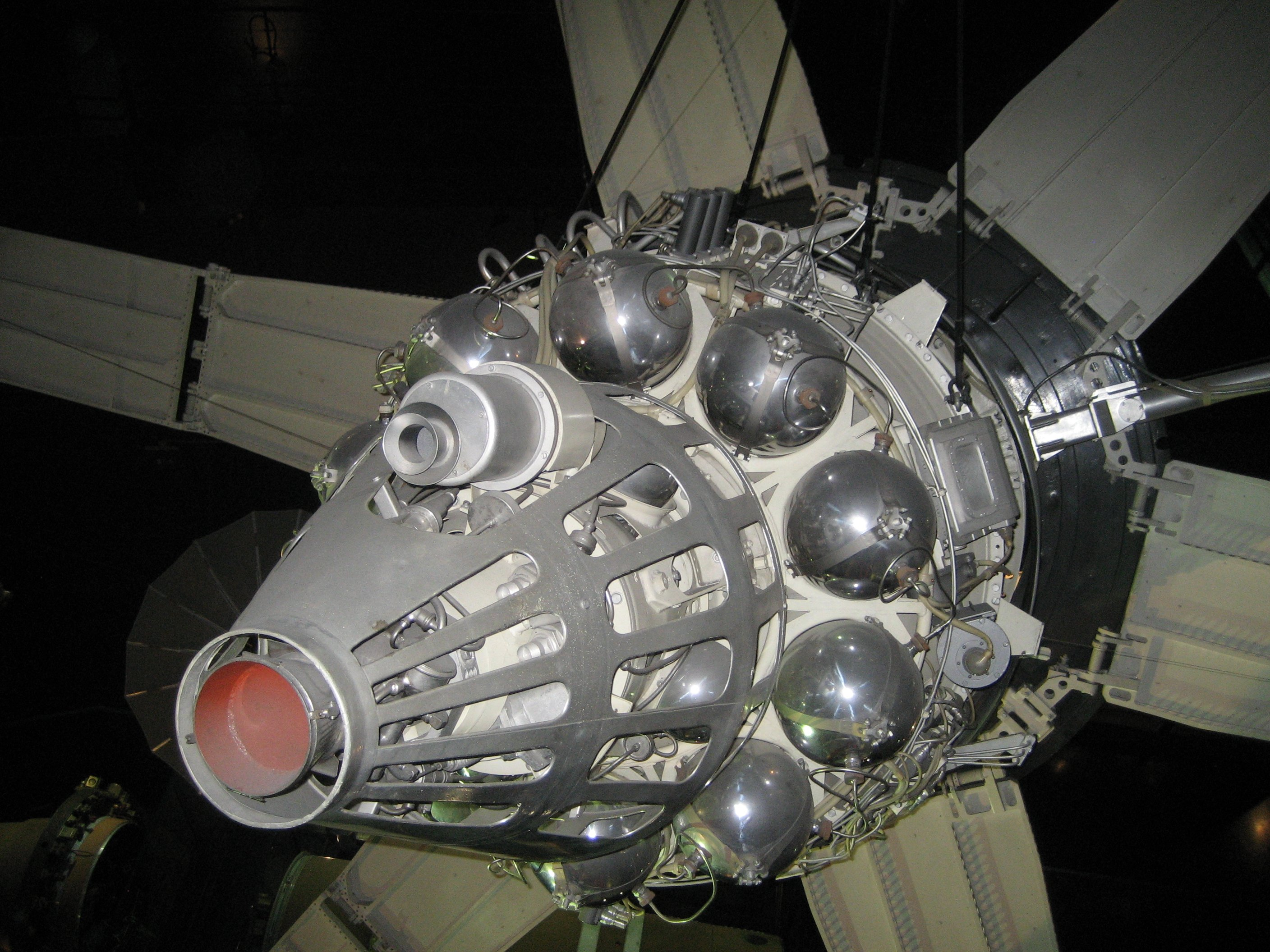
The Molniya-1 spacecraft from a close distance. The spherical cylinders with nitrogen reserves of the orientation system are clearly visible

The platform consisted of a cylindrical pressurized compartment with service and relay equipment, on which were attached: six folding solar battery panels, a correction propulsion system shaped like a truncated cone, antennas, external radiators of the thermal control system, actuators and spherical cylinders with nitrogen reserves of the orientation system. The satellite body was oriented with its longitudinal axis towards the Sun, and the antennas, mounted on an external rod, were independently aimed at the Earth. Due to the imperfection of the radio equipment, the active life of the Molniya-1 spacecraft was only about six months, which was significantly improved in subsequent satellites of the series.

== Control system ==
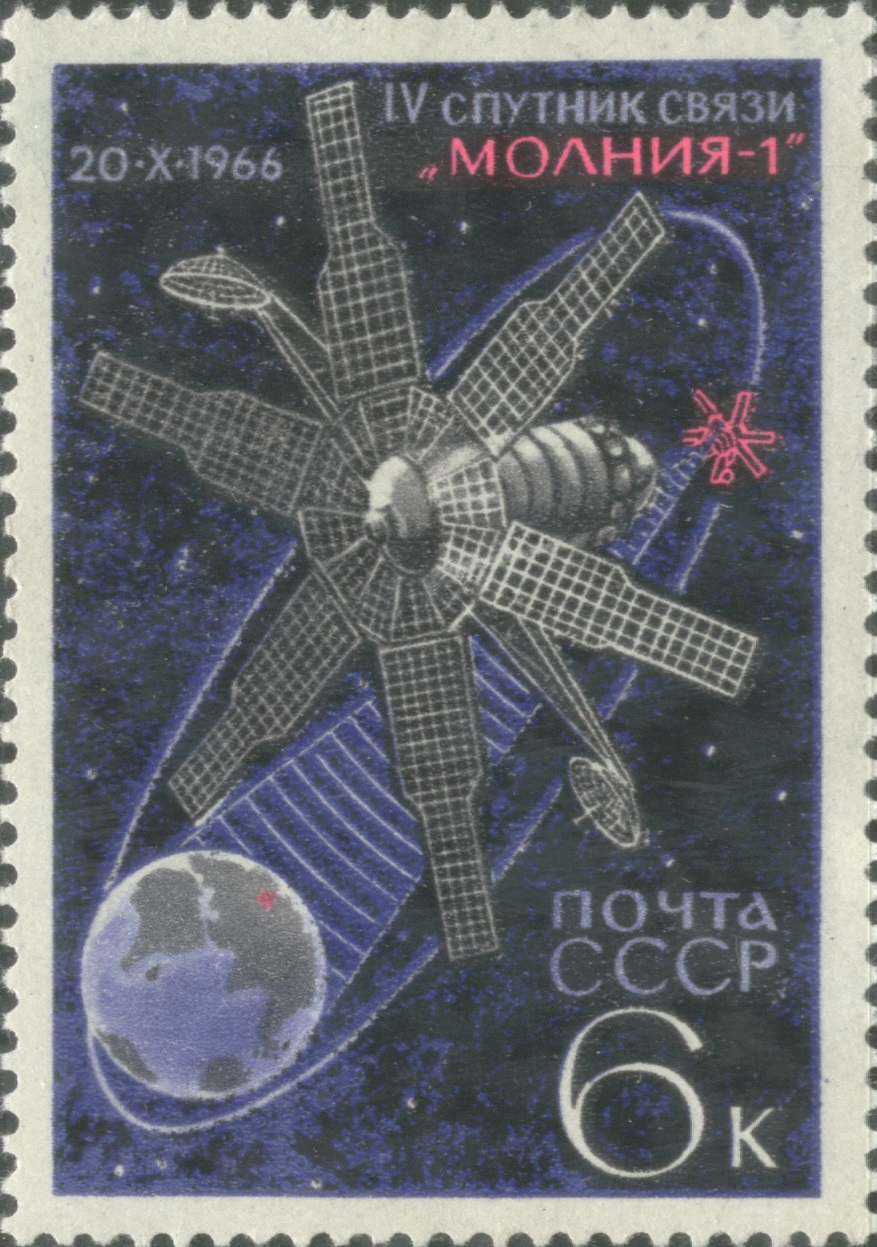
USSR postage stamp issued in 1966. IV communications satellite Molniya-1

The Molniya-1 spacecraft had a unique attitude control system, in which the object's motion around the center of mass along three axes was controlled by a single gyroscope. Since the solar panels were rigidly attached to the body, the spacecraft had to be constantly oriented toward the Sun. This was achieved using a massive gyroscope installed inside the satellite.

After the satellite separated from the launch vehicle and oriented toward the Sun, the gyroscope was spun up to high speed. The peculiarity of the gyroscope is that, when spun up, it maintains a constant direction of its axis in space. The gyroscope installed inside the Molniya 1 was connected to it by weak springs with dampers to reduce vibrations. The spacecraft seemed to "hang", tied to the gyroscope. Although the mechanical part was very complex, the electronic part of the system turned out to be quite simple and reliable, and over many years of operation of the Molniya-1 satellites, it worked without failure. This gyroscopic system was supplemented by KDU-414 microengines operating on compressed nitrogen, which corrected minor deviations of the object from the specified position due to disturbances or temporary changes in the trajectory. The combination of a power gyroscope and microengines made it possible to create a very economical orientation system with minimal fuel consumption.

=== Target equipment ===
In order to increase reliability, the onboard repeater consisted of five receiving and transmitting units, the transmitters of three of them had a power of 40 W, the remaining two - 20 W, low-power units were intended to be switched on in situations of insufficient electricity. The frequency of the line "ground" - "board" - "ground" - ≈ 800 MHz, "board" - "ground" - ≈ 1000 MHz.

Two parabolic antennas with a diameter of 1.4 meters were used as antennas, with the possibility of backing up each other. They were placed on remote rods and controlled by an electromechanical drive. The antenna feed was equipped with optical sensors that detected the edges of the Earth's disk, directing the antennas toward the center of the visible disk.
