= Intelsat II F-3 =

Communications satellite

- Mission type: Communications
- Operator: Intelsat
- COSPAR ID: 1967-026A
- SATCAT no.: 2717
- Mission duration: 3 years

Spacecraft properties
- Spacecraft type: Intelsat II
- Bus: HS-303A
- Manufacturer: Hughes
- Launch mass: 162 kilograms (357 lb)
- BOL mass: 86 kilograms (190 lb)
- Power: 85 watts

Start of mission
- Launch date: March 23, 1967, 01:30:12 UTC
- Rocket: Delta E1
- Launch site: Cape Canaveral LC-17B
- Contractor: NASA

End of mission
- Deactivated: Early 1970s

Orbital parameters
- Reference system: Geocentric
- Regime: Geosynchronous
- Longitude: 15° west (1967-71, 1973); 35° west (1972)
- Perigee altitude: 35,716 kilometers (22,193 mi)
- Apogee altitude: 35,892 kilometers (22,302 mi)
- Inclination: 5.81 degrees
- Period: 23.94 hours
- Epoch: February 7, 2014, 14:16:27 UTC

Intelsat II F-3, also known as Canary Bird, was a communications satellite operated by Intelsat. Launched in 1967 it was operated in geostationary orbit, spending most of its operational life at a longitude of 15 degrees west.

The third of four Intelsat II satellites to be launched, Intelsat II F-3 was built by Hughes Aircraft around the HS-303A satellite bus. It carried two transponders, which were powered by body-mounted solar cells generating 85 watts of power. The spacecraft had a mass of 162 kilograms (357 lb) at launch, decreasing through expenditure of propellant to 86 kilograms (190 lb) by the beginning of its operational life.

Intelsat II F-3 was launched atop a Delta E1 rocket flying from Launch Complex 17B at the Cape Canaveral Air Force Station. The launch took place at 01:30:12 on March 23, 1967, with the spacecraft entering a geosynchronous transfer orbit. It fired an SVM-1 apogee motor to place itself into its operational geostationary orbit. The spacecraft was operated at a longitude of 15° west, over the Atlantic Ocean. It was briefly relocated to 35° west in 1972, but had returned to 15° west by the following year.

Due to its association with the Maspalomas Station, Intelsat II F-3 acquired the unofficial nickname Canary Bird, a reference to the Canary Islands, where the station was located.

As of February 7, 2014 the derelict Intelsat II F-3 was in an orbit with a perigee of 35,716 kilometers (22,193 mi), an apogee of 35,892 kilometers (22,302 mi), inclination of 5.81 degrees and an orbital period of 23.94 hours.
