= Alexander Kølpin (ballet dancer) =

Danish actor and ballet dancer

Alexander Kølpin (born 1 June 1965) is a Danish former ballet dancer. He had later worked as theatre director and actor. He and his father Jes Kølpin own the hotel group Kølpin Hotels, with Hotel Sanders in Copenhagen and Helenekilde Badehotel and Tsivildeleje Strandhotel in Tisvilde.

== Early life and education ==
Kølpin was born on 1 June 1965 in Charlottenlund north of Copenhagen. He is the son of architect and theatre director Jes Kølpin and designer Mugge Kølpin, (née Helen Gerd Hansen). He was admitted to the Royal Danish Ballet's ballet school in 1978.

== Dancing career ==
Kølpin was associated the Royal Danish Ballet from 1991. In 1998, he was appointed solo dancerat the Royal Danish Ballet.

Kølpin left the Royal Danish Ballet in 1995. In 1991, Kølpin founded Copenhagen International Ballet. In 1992, he was awarded the Prix Benois de la Danse in the Danseur category.In 1995-96, he was associated Béjart Ballet in Switzerland. In 1997-99, he was associated the Twyla Tharp in New York.

In 2001, he created a modern interpretation of Sylfiden at Østre Gasværk Teater.

== Film, television and theatre ==
In 1997, Kølpin had a minor role in the Susanne Bier-directed feature film Sekten. In 2005, he appeared as himself in an episode of the TV2 sitcom Klovn. In 2006, he created the short film Under bæltestedet. In 2008, he created the documentary film Min svigerfar about his father-in-law Peter Zobel.

He has also appeared as an actor in Lars Kaalund's musical Casino Moonlight (2004).

== Kølpin Hotels ==
Kølpin and his father Jes Kølpin own Kølpin Hotels. The hotel group owns Hotel Sanders in Copenhagen and the beach hotels Helenekilde Badehotel and Tisvildeleje Strandhotel in Tisvilde.

== Personal life ==
Kølpin was for a while married to the 17 years older former ballet dancer and educator Anne Marie Vessel. They are the parents of actor Niclas Vessel Kølåon (born 1985).

In July 1999, he married psychologist Sarah Mia Zobel Kølpin (18-01-1974). They divorced in 2012.

== See also ==
- Alexander Kølpin
