= Commercial fishing in Spain =

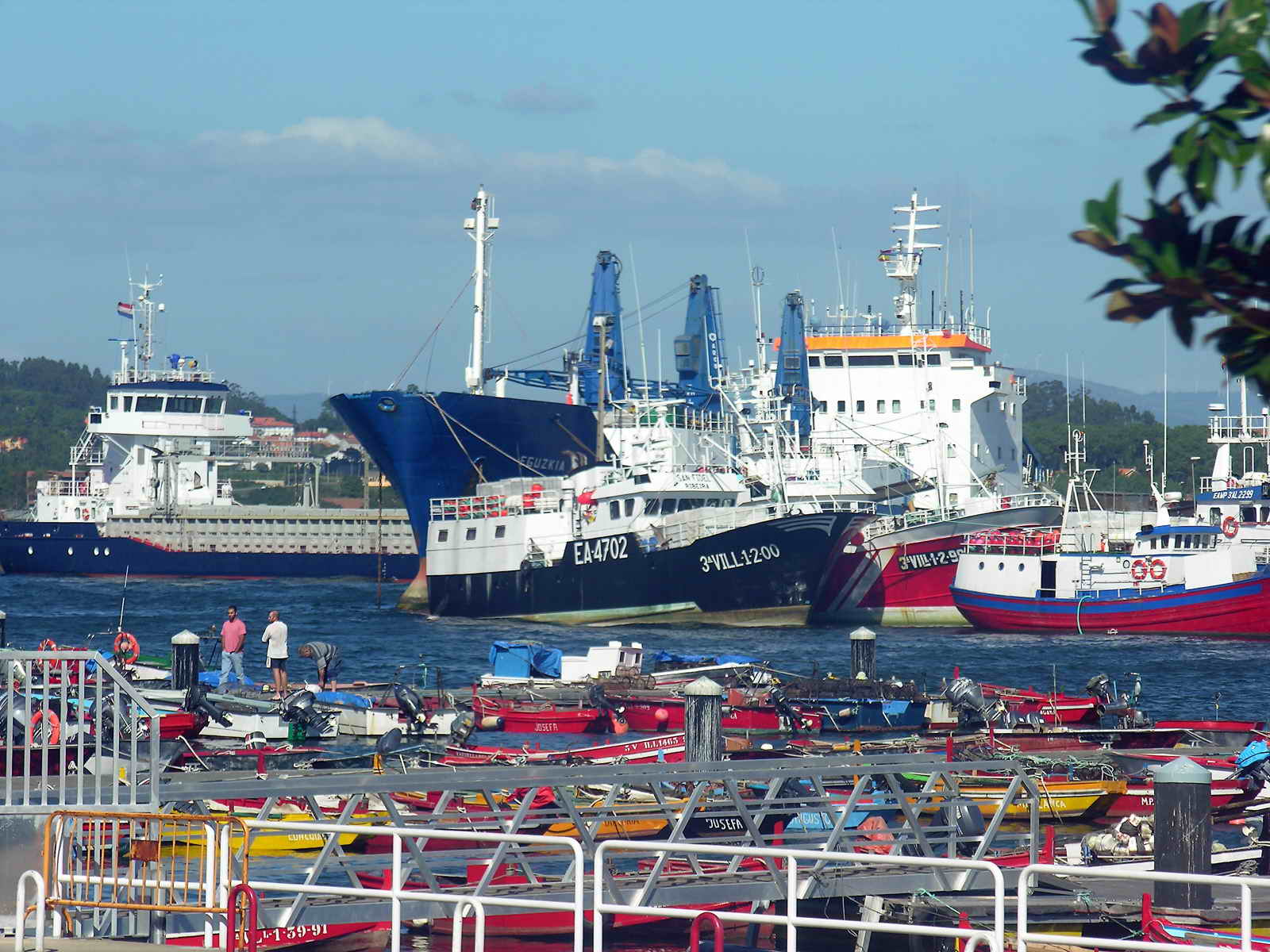
A fishing fleet in Ribeira, Galicia.

Spain is an eminently maritime country with a long continental shelf running along the entire periphery of the Spanish coast. This narrow continental shelf is extremely rich in fish resources since the shelf is close to land.

The exploitation of these marine resources has a long tradition in Spain. Even in the Middle Ages and the Modern Age, the salted cod and anchovy, sardine, and pickled tunafish trade, etc. established links between the Galician, Cantabrian, South Atlantic or Levante ports, and the inner cities.

The territorial sea is a belt of coastal waters extending 200 nautical miles at most from the baseline of a coastal state, mark out the area of the Exclusive Economic Zone (EEZ). This is the national fishing ground. Most of the Spanish fishing vessels fish in four different fishing areas of the national fishing ground: the Cantabrian-Northwest, the Gulf of Cádiz, the Canary Islands and the Mediterranean Sea. It has to do with an inshore fleet, whose vessels are in censuses, allowing them to fish in certain areas of the fishing grounds with specific techniques or rigs, although there is a significant number of fishing units of artisanal nature.

The increased demand for fishery products laid bare the lack of the fishing production in the national fishing grounds, leading to the development of fisheries in international waters and far-away fishing grounds.

The Treaty of the European Union establishes that fishing is one of the Common Policies and that, therefore, the Union has exclusive jurisdiction in this matter. There is rivalry among the autonomous communities over the fishing that takes place in inland waters, as well as over shellfishing and aquaculture, and with regard to management of the fishing sector and fishery product marketing, development, and execution of the unitary framework. This framework is determined by Law 3/2001, of March 26, Law of Maritime Fishing of the State.

== Fishing activity ==
Among the development policies from the 1950s to the 1970s, Spain aimed to become a world power in obtaining maritime resources (Uxio Labarta, 1985 et al.). The Spanish fleet acquired large catches in some fishing grounds regarded as open, although to do this, they needed to travel far from the continental shelf and fish in other countries' territorial waters.

Fishing to this very day is still important in Spain. Until the 1980s, Spanish boats, supported by a fleet of freezer boats, went out fishing into the fishing grounds. This way, the fish could be evenly distributed among markets at reasonably low prices. This continued until other people saw how their fishing resources were being exploited without any monetary compensation, so they decided to increase their aquatic territory area to 2000 nautical miles in the Sea Convention, supported by the United Nations (Oya, 1995, Salvá, 1990).

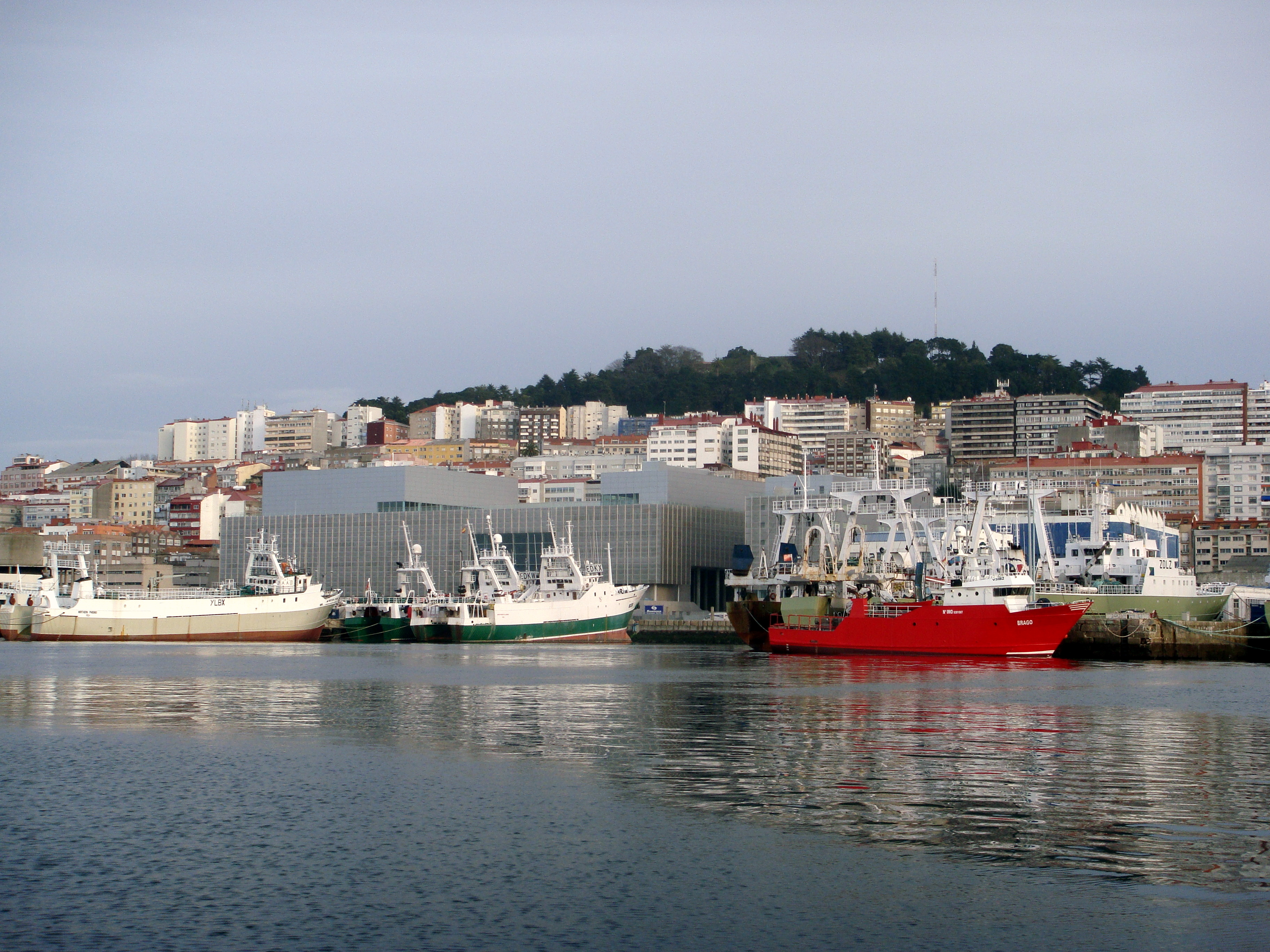
Fishing trawlers moored in the Port of Vigo.

From then on, Spain has had no choice but to negotiate with the other countries, coming to convenient agreements so that both sides can continue to fish in these aquatic areas. These negotiations with various EU (European Union) countries are still ongoing due to the EU's view that it is the European Commission's job to negotiate fish allocation quotas along with fishing boats, for those countries that use them, bringing fishing into common political debate. At the same time, the EU can rule closed seasons upon certain fishing boats, or put restrictions on catching certain species of fish that are in high demand, like when for example, in the Cantabrian Sea, anchovy fishing was banned for some time to allow for its recovery.

In any case, despite the 2000 nautical mile agreement that Spain had managed to come to with the different countries, this still resulted in the loss of fishing grounds (for example in Norway, Boston, Newfoundland etc.), the loss of some fisheries (like the cod fishing industry), large boat destruction, the birth of countless mixed companies (many Spanish fishermen work under English, Argentine, or Namibian pavilions), and travelling boat fleets which, if not able to fish in one fishing ground, can sail to another which is available.

Spanish boats fish all around the world, such as in the Atlantic Ocean (in Morocco, Mauritania, Guinea-Bissau, Guinea-Conakry, and Angola) as well as in the East Pacific Rise, in Arctic Oceans and more recently in the Indian Ocean (in Madagascar, the Seychelles, the Comoros, and Mauritius).

== Fish consumption in Spain ==
Yearly fish consumption per capita is around 40 kg (FAO, 1998). Spain is the most important country in terms of seafood consumption by its residents after Japan, Norway and Portugal, although the abundant fishing potential in the continental shelf has been reduced due to over-fishing. Aquaculture only reaches a small portion of its total production, even though it is increasing.

In order to supply the markets, the fishing industry has diversified its work area, unloading fresh fish from other seas in ports, either from foreign, international, or territorial waters which they have previously come to a fishing agreement with:

- Fresh or frozen fish from the Irish Conservation Box, the Sole Bank, the Canary-Saharian Bank, etc. (which has been possible thanks to the modern cooling systems on board).
- Frozen fish and seafood from Southern Africa, the Gulf of Guinea, etc.
- Importing some goods.
- Importing captured fish, transformed by Spanish or mixed enterprises which are located outside of the EC (in Argentina, Chile, Namibia...).
- Buying living animals to rear them in some littoral areas (extended practice when it comes to seafood).

Fish, crustaceans, and mollusks in good condition are currently available from anywhere in the world.

=== Fishing production ===
In 1980, fishing production in Spain amounted to 1.15 million tonnes, broken down into 75% fish, 20% molluscs and 5% other species (Map, 1981). In 2013, production amounted to a million tonnes, with a first-sale price of 2.165 billion euros.

Regarding the different fished species, the Atlantic horse mackerel, mackerel, sardine, anchovy, and tuna in its different varieties, as well as hake, four-spot megrim, angler fish and pollock are the most important. Mussels farmed from hanging ropes on rafts make up the majority of mollusc production. The commercialisation of seafood species, such as clams, wedge clams, cockles, etc., which are gathered from the coast, takes place mainly in Galicia. Almost all current mussel rafts are located there. Langoustine and prawn fishing in community waters from the eastern and Andalusian coast of Spain, as well as the fishing ground in North Africa, stand out when it comes to crustacean fishing.

The main ports for unloading the catches are the Galician ones in Vigo and in La Coruña, followed by the ones in the Bay of Cádiz, Pasaia, Avilés, Santander and Gijón.

Spain's fishing fleet in 2013

Number of ships	Total GT (Gross tonnage)	Total kW (Power)	Total Crew Embarked
9,871	372,617	1,151,538	33,129

Main figures of sea fishing and aquaculture in 2013

Species group	Maritime fishing (fresh and frozen)		Aquaculture (Mariculture and continental)	
Species group	Live weight (t.)	Value (thousands of €)	Rearing systems on commercial scale. Weight (t.)	Rearing systems on commercial scale. Value (thousands of €)
Fish	928,670	1,785,960	61,263	333,334
Crustaceans	11,044	140,883	70	255
Molluscs	70,913	236,174	164,976	97,539
Others	589	1,909	1.9	759
Total	1,012,433	2,165,319	226,311	431,887

You can find more information on the Ministry of Agriculture, Food and Environment's website.

The processing industry alone produced 850,912 tonnes of processed product worth more than 3.884 billion euros that same year in 2013.

This data complements the foreign trade's information, with imports of 1,477,707 tonnes (4.814 billion euros) and exports of 959,542 tonnes (2.908 billion euros) in 2013, where the community market (EU) represents about one fifth of the commercial transactions.

== Marine reserves in Spain ==
Marine reserves are specific measures that contribute to a sustainable exploitation of the fishing interest's resources, establishing specific protection measures in demarcated areas of the traditional fishing grounds. These areas that are selected taking into account their conservation status, must have certain characteristics that allow an improvement in the reproduction conditions in the interest of the fishes species, and the survival of younger specimens.

Where marine reserves have been placed, the effect has been a significant recovery of fishing grounds as a result of the dispersion of the species whose reproduction has been protected there.

The following marine reserves are in Spain:

- Cabo de Gata – Níjar
- Marine reserve of Cape Palos and Hormigas Islands
- Cala Ratjada
- Alboran Island
- Columbretes Islands
- Graciosa Island and the islets of northern Lanzarote
- Tabarca
- La Palma
- La Restinga – Mar de las Calmas
- Masía Blanca
- Os Miñarzos
- Ría de Cedeira

From the above-mentioned ones, only 5 are under the control of the State: (Masía Blanca, Columbretes Islands, Cabo de Gata-Níjar, Alboran Island and La Palma) and 4 are under shared management (Tabarca, Cape Palos-Islas Hormigas, Graciosa Island and Punta de la Restinga-Mar de Las Calmas). Os Miñarzos and Ría de Cedeira are the autonomous community of Galicia's responsibility.

== See also ==
- Commercial fishing
- Overfishing
- Environmental impact of fishing
- Llotja
- Fishery
- Common Fisheries Policy
- Fishing net
- Fishing vessel
- Pescanova
